= List of Purdue University faculty =

The following is a partial list of Purdue University faculty, including current, former, emeritus, and deceased faculty, and administrators at Purdue University.

== Notable faculty ==
=== Agriculture ===
- Earl Butz – former U.S. Secretary of Agriculture
- Ralph Merrill Caldwell – plant breeder
- Gebisa Ejeta – professor of Agronomy, winner of World Food Prize
- Thomas Hertel – founder of the Global Trade Analysis Project
- Jayson Lusk – professor of Agricultural Economics
- Philip E. Nelson – food scientist, winner of the World Food Prize
- Don Paarlberg – former Economic Advisor to the Secretary of Agriculture
- Gerald Shively – professor of Agricultural Economics

=== Engineering and technology ===
- Rakesh Agrawal (professor of Chemical Engineering) – winner of National Medal of Technology
- Arden L. Bement Jr. (professor of Nuclear Engineering) – director of the National Science Foundation, former director of NIST
- Lonnie D. Bentley – professor of computer and information technology
- Sabine Brunswicker – associate professor and director of Research Center for Open Digital Innovation (RCODI)
- Jean-Lou Chameau (professor of Civil Engineering) – president of California Institute of Technology
- Clarence L. "Ben" Coates (head of the School of Electrical Engineering) – computer scientist and engineer known for his work on waveform recognition devices, circuit gates and accumulators
- Supriyo Datta (professor of Electrical Engineering) – researcher of nanoelectronics
- Rui de Figueiredo (professor of Electrical Engineering)
- Charles Alton Ellis (professor of Structural Engineering) – designer of the Golden Gate Bridge
- Reginald Fessenden (professor of Electrical Engineering) – first wireless voice transmission
- W. Kent Fuchs (professor of Electrical and Computer Engineering) – provost of Cornell University
- R. Edwin Garcia (professor of Materials Engineering) – researcher and author
- Leslie Geddes (Showalter Distinguished Professor Emeritus of Biomedical Engineering) – National Medal of Technology recipient
- Frank Bunker Gilbreth, Sr. (lecturer) – industrial engineer
- Lillian Gilbreth (professor of Industrial Engineering) – efficiency expert, first female member of U.S. National Academy of Engineering
- Kathleen Howell – astrodynamist known for deep space spacecraft mission design using halo orbits
- F.W. Hutchinson – engineer and researcher of heating, ventilation, and air conditioning
- Frank P. Incropera (professor of Mechanical Engineering) – ISI highly cited researcher on heat transfer
- Leah Jamieson (professor of Electrical and Computer Engineering and dean of Engineering) – winner of Gordon Prize
- Avinash Kak (professor of Electrical and Computer Engineering) – researcher of information processing
- Rangasami L. Kashyap (professor of Electrical Engineering) – applied mathematician
- Linda Katehi (professor of Electrical Engineering and dean of Engineering) – chancellor of University of California, Davis
- Ronald Latanision – Neil Armstrong Distinguished Visiting Professor
- Daniel B. Luten (instructor in architectural and sanitary engineering) – bridge builder who patented the Luten arch
- Robert E. Machol (professor of Electrical Engineering) – early writer on systems engineering
- Shimon Y. Nof (professor of Industrial Engineering)
- Nicholas A. Peppas (professor of Chemical Engineering) – biochemist and engineer best known for his research in hydrogels for drug delivery
- R. Byron Pipes (professor of Engineering) – former president of Rensselaer Polytechnic Institute
- A. Alan Pritsker (professor of Industrial Engineering) – pioneer in simulation modeling, creator of GERT and SLAM programs
- Joseph Paul Robinson (Distinguished Professor of Cytometry, professor of Biomedical Engineering and Computer and Information Management) – co-inventor of automated microbial classification systems using elastic laser light scatter and fluorescence detection technologies
- Vladimir Shalaev (professor of Electrical and Computer Engineering and of Biomedical Engineering) – researcher of metamaterials, transformation optics, nanophotonics and plasmonics
- R. Norris Shreve (professor of Chemical Engineering)
- Shu Shien-Siu (professor of Engineering Science)
- Mete Sozen (professor of Structural Engineering)
- John W. Sutherland (professor and Fehsenfeld Family Head of Environmental and Ecological Engineering (EEE))
- Rusi Taleyarkhan (professor of Nuclear Engineering)
- Yeram S. Touloukian (professor of Mechanical Engineering) – founder of the Thermophysical Properties Research Center
- Raymond Viskanta – ISI highly cited researcher in the field of heat transfer
- Steve Wereley (professor of Mechanical Engineering) – co-inventor of micro-particle image velocimetry
- Jerry Woodall (professor of Electrical Engineering) – inventor of first commercially viable red LEDs, winner of National Medal of Technology
- Henry T. Yang (professor of Aeronautical and Astronautical Engineering and dean of Engineering) – chancellor of the University of California, Santa Barbara

=== Humanities and social sciences ===
- Dorsey Armstrong – editor-in-chief of Arthuriana
- Louis René Beres – professor of Political Science
- James A. Berlin – theorist in the field of composition studies and the history of rhetoric and composition theory
- Marianne Boruch – poet and essayist
- Robert X. Browning – professor of Political Science
- Ronald Verlin Cassill – novelist, short story writer, reviewer, editor, painter, and lithographer
- Philip B. Coulter – political scientist
- Paul Draper – philosopher of religion, editor of the journal Philo
- William H. Gass – novelist and short story writer
- Roxane Gay – writer and editor
- Mark Harris – novelist and biographer
- Djelal Kadir – literature academic
- Brigit Pegeen Kelly – poet
- Emma Montgomery McRae – professor of Literature, dean of women
- Robert Melson – political scientist specializing in ethnic conflict and genocide
- Cheryl Mendelson – professor of philosophy, novelist, non-fiction writer
- Alan H. Monroe – creator of Monroe's motivated sequence
- Annie Smith Peck – professor of archaeology and Latin, mountaineer
- Victor Raskin – professor of Linguistics, founding editor of Humor: International Journal of Humor Research
- W. Charles Redding – professor of communication, "father" of organizational communication
- Gunther E. Rothenberg – military historian
- Kermit Scott – professor of philosophy, advocate for the poor, previously thought to be the namesake of Kermit the Frog
- Michael Stohl – political scientist

=== Management and economics ===
- Charalambos D. Aliprantis – economist who introduced Banach space and Riesz space methods in economic theory
- Frank Bass – professor of Industrial Administration, a founder of marketing science who developed the Bass diffusion model
- Michael A. Campion – professor of Management, psychologist
- Alok R. Chaturvedi – professor of MIS, founder and director of SEAS Laboratory of Krannert School of Management
- Elizabeth Hoffman – economist, now provost of Iowa State University
- Shailendra Raj Mehta – president and director of Mudra Institute of Communications Ahmedabad
- Raghavendra Rau – Rothschild Professor of Finance at the University of Cambridge
- Stanley Reiter – economist
- Vernon L. Smith – Nobel laureate in Economics in 2002

=== Pharmacy, health and human sciences ===
- Sugato Chakravarty – professor of consumer science, associateeEditor of the Journal of Financial Markets
- Lisa Hopp – nursing educator
- Richard Mattes – nutrition scientist
- Henry L. Roediger III – researcher of psychology and the human memory
- Peter Schönemann – professor of Psychological Sciences
- William H. Starbuck – researcher of cognitive psychology, organizational behavior, and organization theory
- Wei Zheng – pharmaceutical scientist

=== Science and mathematics ===
- Shreeram Shankar Abhyankar – professor of Mathematics, known for his contributions to singularity theory
- Ross H. Arnett, Jr. – entomologist and beetle researcher
- Struther Arnott – molecular biologist and cancer researcher
- Mikhail Atallah – computer scientist, researcher on algorithms and computer security
- Louis Auslander – mathematician
- David Avison – physicist and photographer
- John D. Axtell – chemist, agronomist, a discoverer of high-lysine sorghum
- Harry Beevers – plant physiologist
- Jeffrey Bennetzen – professor of Genetics
- Elisa Bertino – computer scientist, director of CERIAS
- Mary Ellen Bock – statistician, chair of the statistics department 1995–2010, president of the American Statistical Association in 2007
- Dale L. Boger – medicinal and organic chemist
- Carl R. de Boor – assistant professor at Purdue University, won the John von Neumann Prize from the Society for Industrial and Applied Mathematics in 1996
- Louis de Branges de Bourcia – professor of Mathematics, proved the Bieberbach conjecture
- Herbert C. Brown – Nobel laureate in Chemistry in 1979
- Alok R. Chaturvedi – professor in the Department of Computer Sciences; director of Purdue Homeland Security Institute; technical lead for the Sentient World Simulation project
- William S. Cleveland – computer scientist and statistician, known for significant contributions to local regression and data visualization; credited with defining and naming the field of data science
- Douglas Comer – computer scientist, Internet pioneer
- R. Graham Cooks – chemist, mass spectrometrist
- Bruce A. Craig – statistician known for his work in life sciences; director of the Statistical Consulting Service
- Burgess Davis – mathematician and statistician known for his work on martingales and the Burkholder–Davis–Gundy inequality
- Ronald DeVore – mathematician known for approximation theory, wavelet theory, compressive sensing
- Richard Duffin – physicist
- David S. Ebert – computer scientist, director of the U.S. DHS Center of Excellence (COE) in Visual Analytics (VACCINE) and the Center for Education and Research in Information Assurance and Security (CERIAS)
- Ahmed K. Elmagarmid – computer scientist, Executive Director of the Qatar Computing Research Institute
- Paul Erdős – professor of Mathematics, winner of the Wolf Prize in Mathematics in 1983/4
- Ephraim Fischbach – physicist known for research on the fifth force
- Harley Flanders – mathematician and textbook author
- Joseph Francisco – atmospheric chemist, president of the American Chemical Society
- Walter Gautschi – mathematician, contributor to numerical analysis
- Jayanta Kumar Ghosh – statistician
- Alexander Gluhovsky – physicist and statistician known for his contributions to geophysical fluid dynamics and time series analysis in the geosciences
- Melvin Hochster – commutative algebraist
- Otto F. Hunziker – early head of Dairy department, supervised construction of Smith Hall
- Meyer Jerison – mathematician known for his work in functional analysis and rings
- Minhyong Kim – mathematician
- Robert R. Korfhage – computer scientist who contributed to information retrieval
- Karl Lark-Horovitz – pioneer in solid state physics, contributed to the invention of the first transistor
- Brian A. Larkins – molecular biologist
- Chris J. Leaver – botanist, now at the University of Oxford
- László Lempert – professor of mathematics, winner of Stefan Bergman Prize, 2001
- Jingjing Liang – associate professor of forest ecology
- Bernard J. Liska – food scientist
- Sergey Macheret – physicist and aerospace engineer
- George P. McCabe – statistician
- Fred McLafferty – chemist who described the McLafferty rearrangement in mass spectrometry
- Edwin T. Mertz – chemist and biochemist who co-discovered high-lysine corn
- Dan Milisavljevic – astronomer and physicist
- David S. Moore – statistician
- John Ulric Nef – chemist who discovered the Nef reaction
- Ei-ichi Negishi – professor of Chemistry, Nobel laureate in Chemistry in 2010
- Albert Overhauser – professor of Physics, discovered the Overhauser Effect
- Alan Perlis – professor of Mathematics, first person to win the Turing Award, in 1966
- Justin Jesse Price – mathematician
- John R. Rice – professor of Computer Science, founding editor of ACM Transactions on Mathematical Software
- Arthur Rosenthal – mathematician, proved the Hartogs–Rosenthal theorem
- Michael G. Rossmann – professor of Biological Sciences, member of National Academy of Sciences, mapped human common cold virus, pointed out the Rossmann fold
- Herman Rubin – professor of statistics and mathematics known for fundamental contributions across numerous mathematical sciences
- Robert G. Sachs – theoretical physicist, director of Argonne National Laboratory
- David Sanders – professor of Biological Sciences
- Otto Schilling – algebraist
- Julian Schwinger – Nobel laureate in Physics in 1965
- Freydoon Shahidi – mathematician, a namesake of the Langlands–Shahidi method
- Shen Chun-shan – physicist, president of National Tsing Hua University
- Yum-Tong Siu – professor of mathematics
- Jeffrey H. Smith – algebraic topologist
- Eugene Spafford – professor of Computer Science and Director of CERIAS, computer security expert
- Lonnie Lee VanZandt – professor of Physics, formed the molecular biological physics group at Purdue
- Frederi Viens – statistician and mathematician focusing on probability theory, stochastic processes, quantitative finance, and Bayesian statistics
- Jeffrey Vitter (professor of Computer Science and dean of Science, 2002–2008) – computer scientist known for his work on external memory algorithms, provost of University of Kansas
- Clarence Abiathar Waldo – professor of Mathematics, noted for his role in defeating the Indiana Pi Bill of 1897
- George W. Whitehead – algebraic topologist who defined the J-homomorphism
- Harvey Washington Wiley – professor of Chemistry, first FDA commissioner and advocate for the Pure Food and Drug Act of 1906
- Arthur Winfree – theoretical biologist, MacArthur Fellow, winner of the Norbert Wiener Prize in Applied Mathematics
- Myron E. Witham – professor of Mathematics, college football coach
- Siamak Yassemi – algebraist and combinatorialist
- Arif Zaman – professor of Statistics, researcher of pseudo-random number generation and computer science
- Jian-Kang Zhu – Distinguished Professor of Plant Biology

=== Other ===
- Richard Blanton – anthropologist and archaeologist
- David A. Caputo – former dean of the School of Liberal Arts, later president of Pace University
- Amelia Earhart – women's career counselor, aviator
- Joel Fink – Purdue University Theatre, currently associate dean of Roosevelt University
- Benjamin Harrison – trustee, president of the United States
- Ruth Lawanson – volleyball assistant coach, Olympic bronze medal in volleyball (1992).
- Charles Major – trustee, novelist
- Gary Lee Nelson – composer
- Jay Nunamaker – researcher of information systems
- Lynn Okagaki – commissioner of the National Center for Education Research
- John Purdue – founder and namesake
- Timothy Sands – provost, former acting president, materials engineer, president of Virginia Tech
- Mark Smith – dean of Graduate School, 1984 Olympic fencer
- Dorothy C. Stratton – first full-time dean of women (1933–1942), director of the SPARS during World War II
- Lee Watson – Broadway and television lighting designer
- Randy Woodson – former provost, now chancellor of North Carolina State University
- Al G. Wright – former director of bands, now Chairman of the board of the John Philip Sousa Foundation
- Rolv Yttrehus – contemporary classical music composer
