= Wei Zheng (disambiguation) =

Wei Zheng (580–643) was a chancellor of the Tang dynasty. His surname was Wei.

Wei Zheng may also refer to the following people surnamed Zheng:

- Wei Zheng (pharmacist), Chinese-born American pharmacist
- Zheng Wei (born 1981), Chinese footballer
