= MARCbot =

Multi-function Agile Remote-Controlled Robot
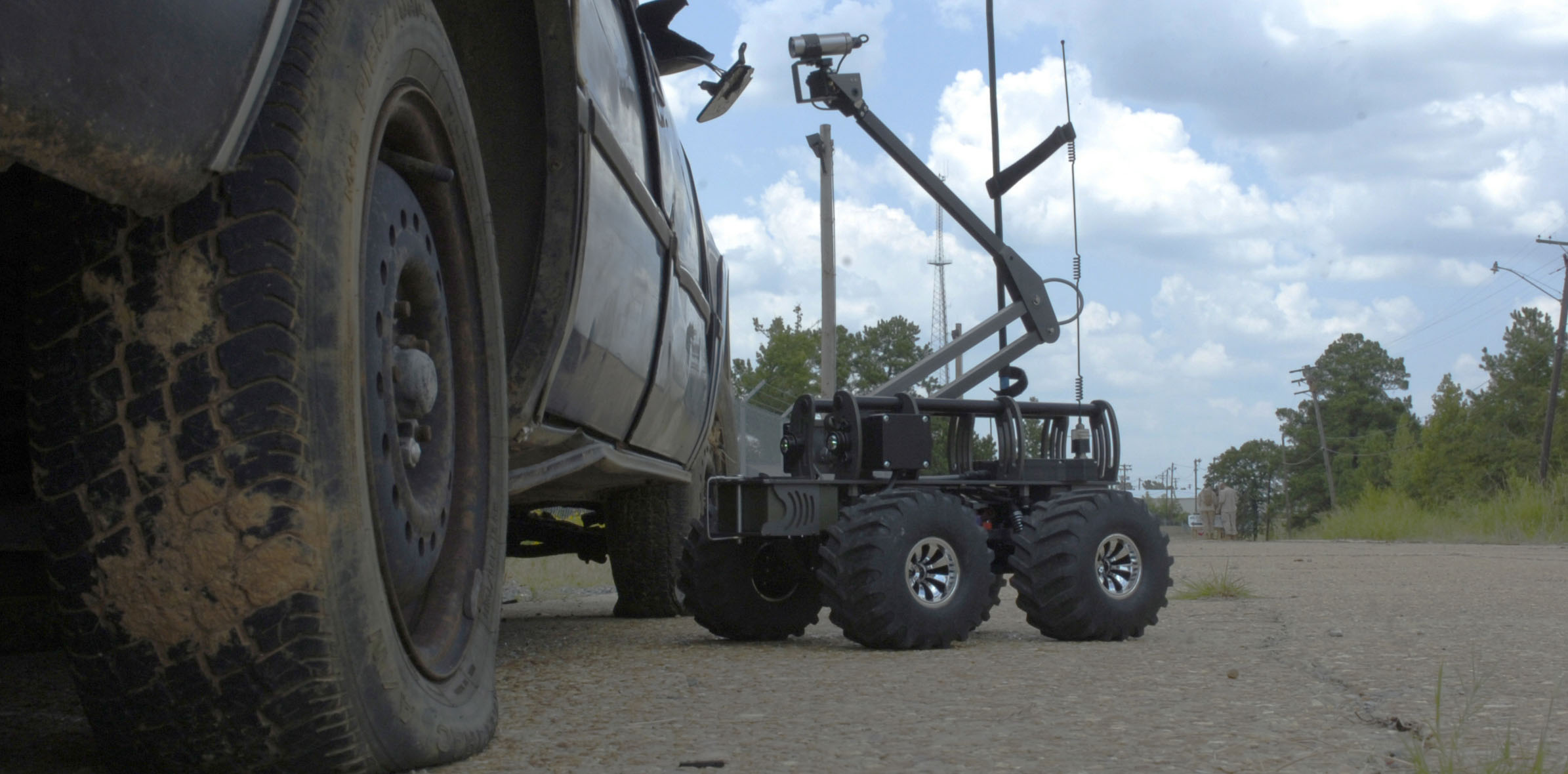
- MARCbot extends its camera to search for suspected improvised explosive devices
- Type: Demolition vehicle
- Place of origin: United States of America (United States Army Rapid Equipping Force)

Service history
- In service: Iraq, Afghanistan
- Used by: United States Army

Production history
- Designed: 2004
- Manufacturer: Exponent
- No. built: Over 1000

Specifications
- Mass: 32 lb (15 kg)
- Length: 24 in (0.61 m)
- Width: 19.5 in (0.50 m)
- Height: 13.5 in (0.34 m)
- Crew: One remote operator
- Operational range: Up to 300 m (980 ft) (Line of sight), 6h on batteries

The Multi-function Agile Remote-Controlled Robot (MARCbot) is a military robot created by Exponent Inc. for the United States Army Rapid Equipping Force.

== Design ==
The MARCbot was designed as a low cost robotic platform used in Iraq for the inspection of suspicious objects. Until its creation when US Army patrols encountered a potential improvised explosive device, they had to either wait for a specialist explosive ordnance disposal team with its specialist / expensive robots, or investigate the suspicious package themselves. Exponent worked with the Rapid Equipping Force to create a low-cost robot for patrol units. Over 1000 MARCbots were eventually created for the US Army for the Iraq War and the War in Afghanistan. The MARCbot reputedly costs $19,000 - however this is less than other contemporary military robots.

The MARCbot is one of smallest and most commonly used robots in Iraq and looks like a small toy truck with an elevated mast on which a camera is mounted. This camera is used to look, for example, behind doors or through windows without placing human soldiers in danger. It is capable of running for 6 hours on a set of fully charged batteries and was developed with the input of soldiers in Iraq to meet their needs.

== Use as an offensive weapon ==
The MARCbot was the first ground robot to draw blood in Iraq. One unit jury-rigged a Claymore antipersonnel mine on their units. If they suspected an ambush they would send the robot ahead. If an insurgent was seen the Claymore would be detonated.

== See also ==
- Military robot
- Goliath tracked mine
