= Shively =

Shively may refer to:

== People ==
- Benjamin F. Shively (1857–1916), American politician, Representative and Senator from Indiana
- Donald Shively (1921–2005), American academic, historian, and author
- George Shively (1893–1962), Negro league baseball player
- Gerald Shively (born 1962), American economist
- Matt Shively (born 1990), American actor
- Tom Shively (born 1946), member of the Missouri House of Representatives

== Places ==
- Shively, California, an unincorporated community
- Shively, Kentucky, a city in the Louisville metropolitan area
- Shively Field, a public airport near Saratoga, Wyoming
- Shively–McClure Historic District in Astoria, Oregon
