= Wilson C. Hayes =

American professor, biomechanical engineer and forensic consultant

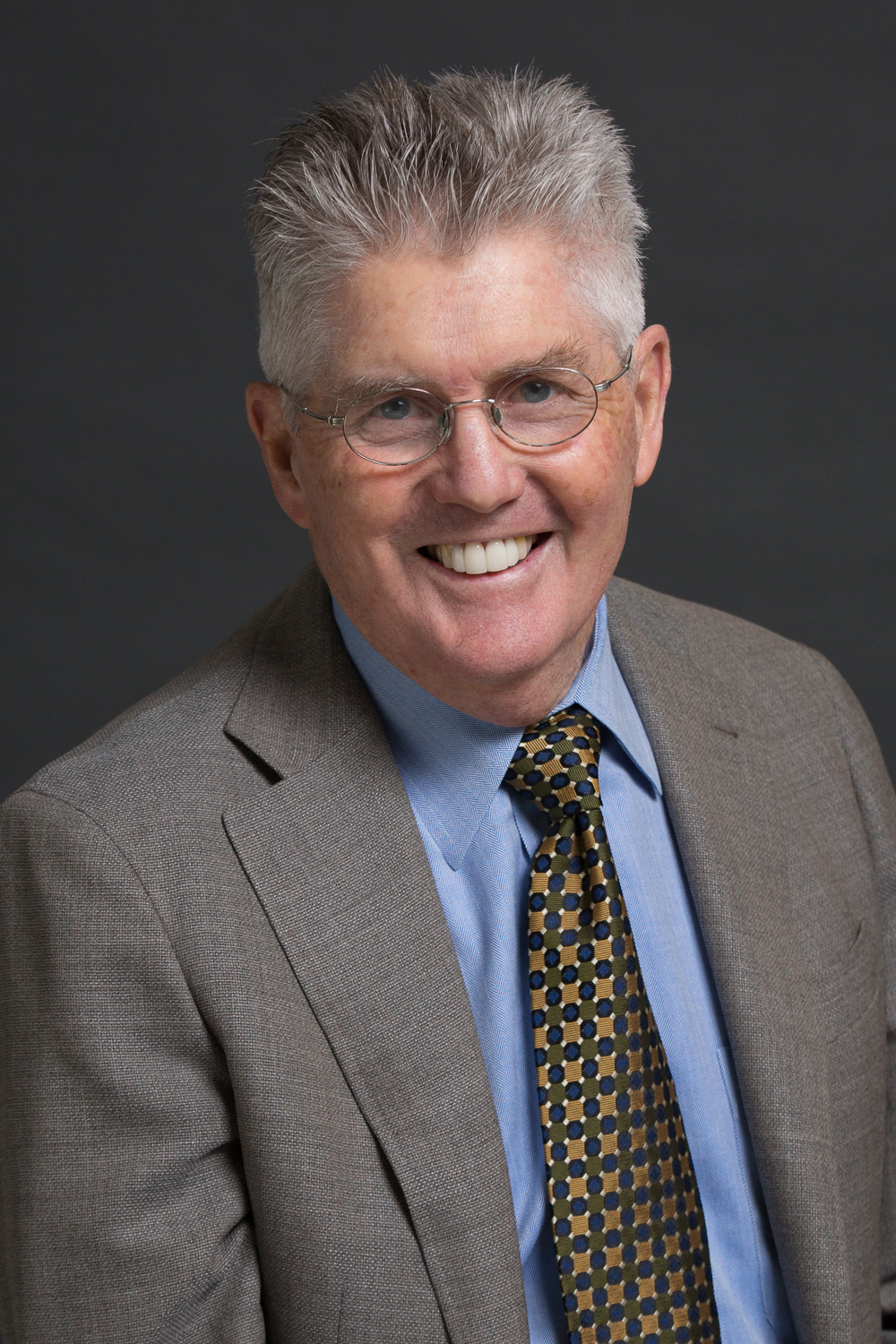
- Born: January 15, 1943 (age 83); San Diego, California
- Other name: Toby Hayes
- Education: B.S.M.E. Stanford University 1964 M.S.M.E. Stanford University 1966 Ph.D. Theoretical and Applied Mechanics, Northwestern University 1970
- Children: Molly Weigent Hayes
- Scientific career
- Fields: Orthopedic Biomechanics
- Workplaces: Stanford University University of Pennsylvania Harvard Medical School Oregon State University
- Website: https://www.hayesassoc.com/our-team-full

Wilson C. "Toby" Hayes (born January 15, 1943) is an American biomechanical engineer and forensic consultant known for his contributions to orthopedic biomechanics and injury prevention, particularly in the study of hip fracture risk, skeletal aging, and bone remodeling. He held senior faculty appointments at Stanford University, Harvard Medical School and Massachusetts Institute of Technology and served as Vice Provost for Research at Oregon State University. While in the Boston area he co-founded and directed the Orthopedic Biomechanics Laboratory at Beth Israel Deaconess Medical Center. He founded and is president of Hayes and Associates, Inc. a consulting firm providing expert testimony in injury biomechanics for both plaintiff and defense cases, in both civil and criminal matters.

== Education ==
Hayes earned a B.S. (1964) and M.S. (1966) in Mechanical Engineering from Stanford University and a Ph.D. in Theoretical and Applied Mechanics from Northwestern University in 1970. He completed postdoctoral training at the Laboratory for Experimental Surgery in Davos, Switzerland (1970) and the Department of Orthopedic Surgery of the Karolinska Institute (1971).

== Academic career ==
- Assistant Professor, Department of Mechanical Engineering and (by courtesy) Department of Surgery (Orthopedics), Stanford University (1971–1976)
- Associate Professor, Department of Orthopedic Surgery, University of Pennsylvania (1976–1979)
- Associate Professor, Department of Orthopedic Surgery, Harvard Medical School, Beth Israel Hospital (1979–1985)
- Associate Professor of Orthopedic Surgery, Harvard-MIT Division of Health Sciences and Technology, Massachusetts Institute of Technology (1983–1985)
- Maurice Edmond Mueller Professor of Biomechanics, Department of Orthopedic Surgery, Harvard Medical School, Beth Israel Deaconess Medical Center where he founded and directed the Orthopedic Biomechanics Laboratory. (1985–1998)
- Professor of Nutrition and Exercise Science, Oregon State University (1998–2001)
- Professor of Orthopedics and Rehabilitation and Vice Chair for Research in Orthopedics, Oregon Health & Sciences University (1998-2004
- Adjunct Professor of Mechanical Engineering, Oregon State University (1998–2007)
- Emeritus Professor of Nutrition and Exercise Sciences (NES), College of Health and Human Sciences, Oregon State University (2007–2022)

== Research Contributions ==
=== Bone Mechanics ===
Hayes's research focused on bone biomechanics, osteoporosis, and hip fracture risk prediction. His 1976 publication with Dennis R. Carter in Science established fundamental relationships between bone density, strain rate, and compressive strength, demonstrating that bone strength is proportional to the square of apparent density. This work provided clinical guidelines for predicting bone strength based on radiographic and densitometric examination.

=== Hip fracture and fall biomechanics ===
Hayes's research on fall-related hip fractures revised the understanding that hip fractures result primarily from age-related bone loss. His 1993 study demonstrated that impact forces near the hip during falls dominate fracture risk in elderly populations.

=== Fracture prediction in the hip and spine and quantitative CT ===
His 1985 publication on predicting vertebral body compressive fracture using quantitative computed tomography was a key publication in this area. In the early 1990s Hayes was involved in research and publications in the use of quantitative tomography for estimating risk of hip fracture from falls and predicting the likelihood of fracture of the hip and spine.

== Mentorship ==
Hayes supervised numerous doctoral students and postdoctoral fellows in biomechanics and orthopaedic research. Some notable former trainees :

- Dennis R. Carter, Ph.D., later Professor of Mechanical Engineering at Stanford University.
- Timothy M. Wright, Ph.D., later Director of Biomechanics at Hospital for Special Surgery.
- Stephen N. Robinovitch, Ph.D., later Professor at Simon Fraser University. Robinovitch's 1994 MIT dissertation on hip fracture and fall impact biomechanics advanced understanding of injury mechanisms in elderly populations.
- Xiang-Dong Edward Guo, Ph.D., later Chair of Biomedical Engineering at Columbia University.
- Michael J. Yaszemski, M.D., Ph.D., later Professor at Mayo Clinic.
- Catherine F. Corrigan, Ph.D., later CEO of Exponent

== Consulting ==
Following his academic career Hayes served as an expert witness and founded Hayes and Associates, a biomechanics consulting practice specializing in injury causation and accident reconstruction analysis and litigation support focused on the biomechanical causation of injuries in vehicular, industrial, premises, and product-related incidents.

== Honors and awards ==
- Kappa Delta Award, American Academy of Orthopedic Surgeons (1981)
- American Academy of Orthopaedic Sports Medicine Research Award (1983)
- Elected as a fellow, American Institute of Medical and Biological Engineering (1993)
- Giovanni Borelli Award from the American Society of Biomechanics (1995) for his lecture "An Update on the Movement of Animals: Falls Among Elderly Humans" The Borelli Award is given by the American Society of Biomechanics and recognizes outstanding career accomplishment in biomechanics research.
- Beth Israel Deaconess Medical Center established the Wilson C. Hayes Distinguished Lecture Series in Musculoskeletal Health in his honor (2022)

== Publications ==
Hayes authored over 200 peer-reviewed articles on bone biomechanics, fracture healing, and injury prevention. He co-edited the textbook Basic Orthopaedic Biomechanics with Van C. Mow.

=== Key Peer Reviewed Publications ===
- Hayes, W. C, Mockros, L. F. Viscoelastic properties of human articular cartilage. Journal of applied physiology. 31(4): 562–568, 1971.
- Hayes, W. C., Keer, L. M., Herrmann, G., Mockros, L. F. A mathematical analysis for indentation tests of articular cartilage. Journal of biomechanics. 5(5): 541–551,1972.
- Carter, D. R., Hayes, W. C. Bone compressive strength: the influence of density and strain rate. Science. 194(4270): 1174–1176, 1976.
- Ruff, C. B., Hayes. W. C. Subperiosteal expansion and cortical remodeling of the human femur and tibia with aging. Science. 217(4563): 945–948, 1982.
- Huberti, H.H. and Hayes, W.C.: Patellofemoral contact pressures: The influence of Q-angle and tendo-femoral contact. J. Bone Joint Surg. [Am], 66: 715–724, 1984.
- McBroom, R.J., Hayes, W.C., Edwards, W.T., et al.: Prediction of vertebral body compressive fracture using quantitative computed tomography. J. Bone Joint Surg. [Am], 67: 1206–1214, 1985.
- Lotz, J.C. and Hayes, W.C.: The use of QCT to estimate risk of fracture of the hip from falls. J. Bone Joint Surg. [Am], 72: 689–700, 1990.
- Shea, M., Edwards, W.T., White, A.A., and Hayes, W.C.: Variations of stiffness and strength along the human cervical spine. J. Biomech., 24: 95–107, 1991.
- Robinovitch, S.N., Hayes, W.C., and McMahon, T.A.: Prediction of femoral impact forces in falls on the hip. J. Biomech. Eng., 113: 366–374, 1991.
- Hayes, W.C., Myers, E.R., Morris, J.N., et al.: Impact near the hip dominates fracture risk in elderly nursing home residents who fall. Calcif. Tissue Int., 52: 192–198, 1993.
- Greenspan, S.L., Myers, E.R., Maitland, L.A., Resnick, N.M., and Hayes, W.C.: Fall severity and bone mineral density as risk factors for hip fracture in ambulatory elderly. JAMA, 271: 128–133, 1994.
- Hayes, W.C., Myers, E.R., Robinovitch, S.N., et al.: Etiology and prevention of age-related hip fractures. Bone, 18:77S-86S, 1996.
- Hayes, W.C., Erickson, M. S., Power, E. D., Forensic injury biomechanics. Annu. Rev. Biomed. Eng. 9(1): 55–86, 2007.
- Erickson M.S. and Hayes, W.C.: Drag factor attenuation for rotating vehicles. Accid. Reconstr. J. 18(3): 19–23, 2008.
- Lee, E.L., Lee, P.J., Erickson, M.S., Hayes, W.C.: Increase in vehicle front, rear, and side stiffness coefficients in the past twenty years... SAE Int 2014-01-0351: 1–6, 2014.
- Lee, E.L., Lee, P.J., Hayes, W.C.: Head accelerations in out-of-position postures in low speed rear impacts. SAE Int 2014-01-0490: 1–7. 2014.
- Power, E.D., Bauer, J.J., Hayes, W.C.: Reconstruction of a shooting incident to determine position of shooter and timing of each shot fired. Ann For Res Anal 5(1): 105, 2018.

== Key Patents ==
- Increasing bone fracture resistance by repeated application of low magnitude forces resembling trauma forces. U.S. Patent 5,752,925, 1998.
- Bone fracture prevention garment and method. U.S. Patent 5,599,290, 1997.
- Bone fracture prevention method. U.S. Patent 5,545,128, 1996.
- Bioerodible polymers for drug delivery in bone. U.S. Patent 5,286,763, 1994.
- Intramedullary nailing method and apparatus. U.S. Patent 5,100,404, 1992.
