= Ronald Latanision =

American academic and businessman

Ronald M. Latanision
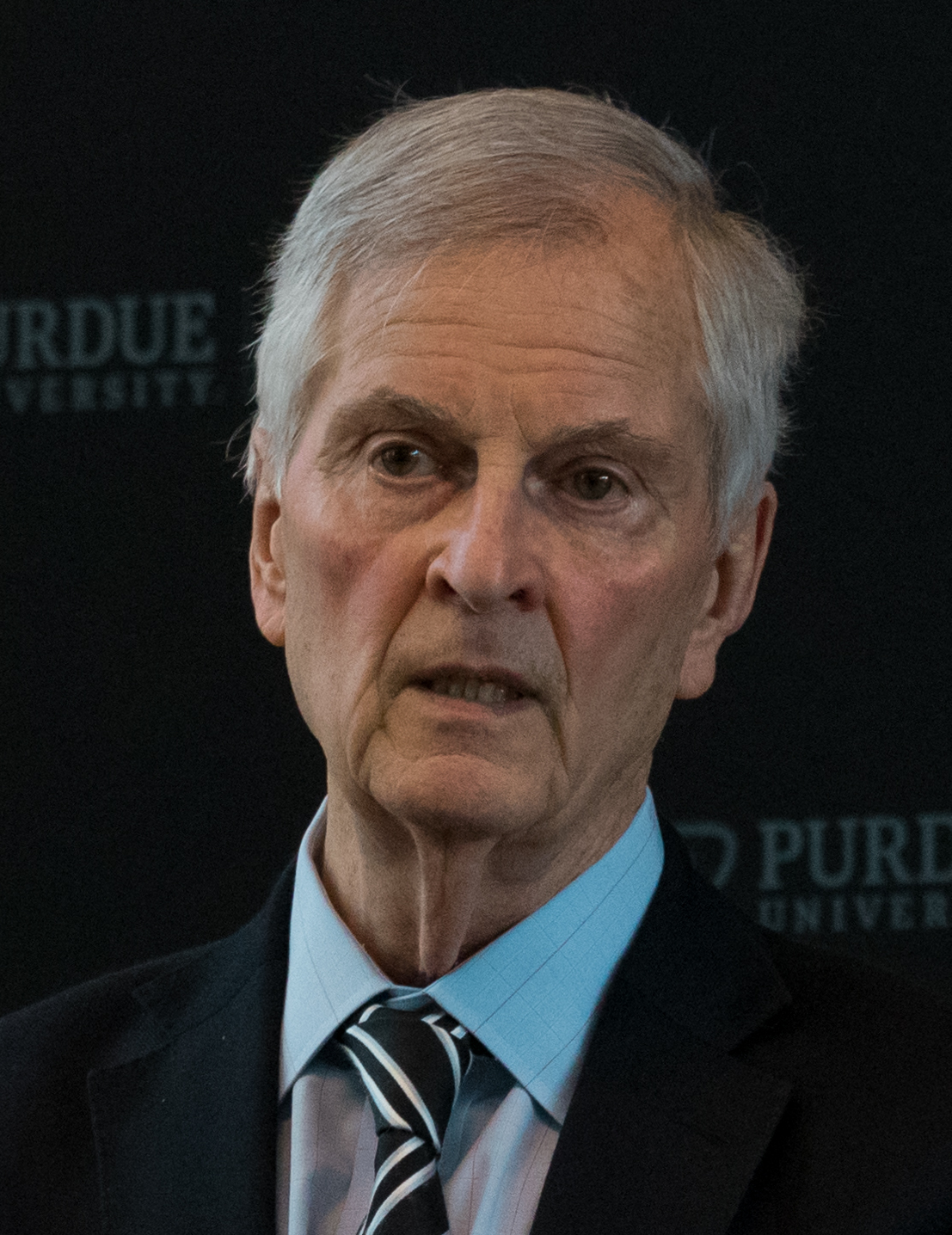
- Born: July 2, 1942 (age 83); Pennsylvania, United States
- Education: B.S., Metallurgy; Ph.D., Metallurgical Engineering
- Alma mater: Pennsylvania State University; Ohio State University
- Spouse: Carolyn D. Latanision
- Scientific career
- Institutions: Purdue University; Massachusetts Institute of Technology (MIT); Altran Materials Engineering; Exponent

Ronald M. Latanision (born July 2, 1942) is an American materials scientist, corrosion engineer, academic and businessman. He is an emeritus professor of materials science and engineering at the Massachusetts Institute of Technology (MIT), the Neil Armstrong Distinguished Visiting professor at Purdue University, and serves as a senior fellow at Exponent, where he also served as a corporate vice president.

Latanision's research has primarily focused on the corrosion of metals, materials processing, and the behavior of materials in aqueous environments, including ambient and high-temperature/pressure conditions, with experience in corrosion science and engineering, particularly in materials selection for advanced engineering systems and failure analysis. His work has covered processing technologies and electrochemical systems as well, such as batteries, fuel cells, waste destruction, supercritical water power generation, stress corrosion cracking, hydrogen embrittlement, and photoelectrochemistry. He has won awards such as Henry B. Linford Award, Hosler Alumni Scholar Medal, and Lee Hsun Award.

Latanision served as co-editor-in-chief of Corrosion Reviews and is the editor-in-chief of the NAE Quarterly, The Bridge. He acted as a member of the International Corrosion Council, is a member of the NAE, and the American Academy of Arts and Sciences and holds the title of Fellow at NACE International, and ASM International.

== Education and career ==
Latanision earned his Bachelor of Science in metallurgy from Pennsylvania State University in 1964 and received a Ph.D. in metallurgical engineering from the Ohio State University in 1968, focusing on the plastic deformation of nickel single crystals under Roger Staehle. Following this, he completed a postdoctoral fellowship at the National Bureau of Standards, where he studied Fe-Cr-Ni alloys. In 1969, he joined Martin Marietta Laboratories and became the acting head of the Materials Science Group in January 1974. Later that year, he transitioned to the MIT as an associate professor and took on the role of director of the Corrosion Laboratory, which would later be dedicated to H.H. Uhlig in 1982.

Starting in 1983, Latanision held the Shell Distinguished Chair in Materials Science at MIT, becoming its inaugural holder until 1988. Subsequently, he served as director of the School of Engineering's Materials Processing Center from 1985 to 1991, and accepted joint faculty appointments in the Department of Nuclear Engineering in 1996. Furthermore, in the early 1980s, he developed a twenty-lecture video course on Corrosion Engineering through MIT's Center for Advanced Engineering Study. He has hosted the Wilson Science and Technology Forum, a program recorded, edited, and aired on local television. In 2021, while moderating discussions from The Bridge’s 50th Anniversary issue, he led conversations on the NAE president's perspective on unintended consequences, technocracy, climate change, and the imperative for an inclusive web that meets societal needs.

Latanision founded the MIT Science and Engineering Program for Teachers (SEPT) in 1989, which later transitioned into the Network of Educators in Science and Technology (NEST). He also established MIT's Council on Primary and Secondary Education (CPSE) in 1991, leading it for several years while launching a K-12 teacher education program. In 1992, he co-led Project PALMS in Massachusetts, a statewide initiative focused on improving mathematics and science education, and concurrently advised Senator Paul Tsongas during his presidential campaign. From 1993, he hosted the annual Siemens Science and Technology Competition at MIT for more than a decade.

In April 2015, Latanision was appointed an adjunct professor at the Key Laboratory of Nuclear Materials and Safety Assessment at the Institute of Metal Research of the Chinese Academy of Sciences, and has been serving as an emeritus Professor at MIT.

Between 1982 and 1983, Latanision served as a science advisor to the U.S. House of Representatives Committee on Science and Technology, working with members including Don Fuqua, Dan Glickman and Al Gore. Additionally, he was a member of the Massachusetts Office of Science and Technology Advisory Committee, the National Materials Advisory Board of the National Research Council (NRC), and the NRC's Standing Committee on Chemical Demilitarization.

Latanision's interest in technology and policy led him to consider running for the United States House of Representatives in 1986 against Ed Markey, supported by contacts from his sabbatical. However, he later withdrew his candidacy because his wife did not want him to run. In June 2002, he was appointed by then-President George W. Bush to serve on the U.S. Nuclear Waste Technical Review Board (NWTRB) and later reappointed for a second four-year term by then-President Barack Obama.

== Later career ==
In 1992, Latanision co-founded Altran Materials Engineering (AME) Corporation with Reggie Pelloux and Ron Ballinger, along with Tom Esselman. The company was acquired by Altran Technologies of Paris, France in 2000. Unsatisfied with the new direction, he consulted with Roger McCarthy, then CEO of Exponent, who suggested exploring consulting opportunities, leading him to join Exponent in 2002 on leave from MIT.

== Research ==
Latanision is most known for his research on the chemistry and physics of fracture, surface effects in crystal plasticity, atomistics of fracture, supercritical water oxidation of wastes and hydrogen embrittlement of nickel based alloys. His research initially explored surface effects on solid properties and extended to how service environments contribute to corrosion in engineering systems, resulting in patents, and around 300 peer-reviewed papers on environmentally assisted cracking, water and ionic permeation in thin films, photo-electrochemistry, and aging/life prediction in engineering materials.

== Awards and honors ==
- 1974 – Senior U.S. Scientist Award, Alexander von Humboldt Foundation
- 1985 – Member, NAE
- 1988 – Fellow, ASM International
- 1992 – Honorary Alumnus, MIT
- 1994 – W.R. Whitney Award, NACE International
- 1995 – Fellow, NACE International
- 1997 – Fellow, American Academy of Arts and Sciences
- 2004 – Henry B. Linford Award, Electrochemical Society
- 2014 – Hosler Alumni Scholar Medalist, Penn State University
- 2015 – Lee Hsun Award, Chinese Academy of Sciences

== Bibliography ==
=== Selected books ===
- Surface Effects in Crystal Plasticity (1977) ISBN 9789028600669
- Atomistics of Fracture (1983) ISBN 9781461335023
- Chemistry and Physics of Fracture (1987) ISBN 9789024735808
- Growing Up with Anthracite Roots

=== Selected articles ===
- Latanision, R. M., & Ruff, A. W. (1971). The temperature dependence of stacking fault energy in Fe-Cr-Ni alloys. Metallurgical Transactions, 2, 505–509.
- Latanision, R. M., & Opperhauser, H. (1974). The intergranular embrittlement of nickel by hydrogen: the effect of grain boundary segregation. Metallurgical and Materials Transactions B, 5, 483–492.
- Khamis, E., Bellucci, F., Latanision, R. M., & El-Ashry, E. S. H. (1991). Acid Corrosion Inhibition of Nickel by 2-(Triphenosphoranylidene) Succinic Anhydride. CORROSION, 47(9), 677–686.
- Moffat, T. P., & Latanision, R. M. (1992). An electrochemical and X‐Ray photoelectron spectroscopy study of the passive state of chromium. Journal of the Electrochemical Society, 139(7), 1869.
- Hihara, L. H., & Latanision, R. M. (1994). Corrosion of metal matrix composites. International Materials Reviews, 39(6), 245–264.
- Eliaz, N., Shemesh, G., & Latanision, R. M. (2002). Hot corrosion in gas turbine components. Engineering failure analysis, 9(1), 31–43.
