= Majchrzak =

Majchrzak (Polish pronunciation: [ˈmai̯xʂak]) is a Polish surname, it may refer to:

- Ann Majchrzak, American academic
- Jordan Majchrzak (born 2004), Polish footballer
- Julia Majchrzak (born 2000), Polish television personality
- Kacper Majchrzak (born 1992), Polish swimmer
- Kamil Majchrzak (born 1996), Polish tennis player
- Katarzyna Majchrzak (born 1967), Polish high jumper
- Krzysztof Majchrzak (born 1948), Polish film actor
