= Sabine Brunswicker =

Professor for Digital Innovation

Sabine Brunswicker is an engineer, researcher, and an entrepreneurial academic employed as a Full Professor at Purdue University, West Lafayette, United States, specializing in artificial intelligence, digital technology, and innovation. She is the Founder and Director of the Center on AI for Digital, Autonomous and Augmented Aviation (AIDA3), established in 2024 through a partnership between Purdue University and Windracers Group, a UK-based entrepreneurial drone manufacturer where she also serves as strategic advisor.

== Education ==
Brunswicker holds a Bachelor of Science in Mechanical Engineering and Management Sciences from the University of Technology, Darmstadt, Germany, and a Master of Commerce from the University of New South Wales, Australia. She also earned a Master of Science in Mechanical Engineering and Management Sciences from the University of Technology, Darmstadt, Germany, and completed her PhD in Engineering Sciences with highest honors from the University of Stuttgart, Germany. Her doctoral dissertation received the Best Dissertation Award in 2012 from John Wiley & Sons and the International Society for Professional Innovation Management (ISPIM) as well as the Society for Production Engineering.

== Career ==
Prior to establishing AIDA3, Brunswicker founded the Research Center for Digital Innovation (RCODI) at Purdue University. Before joining Purdue, she served as Chief Research Scientist at Fraunhofer Institute for Industrial Engineering in Stuttgart, Germany. Throughout her career, she has held visiting professorships at Northwestern University's Institute on Complex Systems (NICO), Technical University of Munich (TUM), and ESADE Business School (until 2016). She was also an adjunct professor of Digital Innovation in the College of Engineering at Queensland University of Technology, Brisbane, Australia.

== Research and Recognition ==
Brunswicker is an internationally recognized authority in open digital innovation, having authored numerous research papers and book chapters at the intersection of innovation, digital technology, artificial intelligence, and autonomous control. As a keynote speaker, she has chaired World Economic Forum workshops and spoken at forums, including the Alpbach Forum in 2014. In 2022, following significant personal loss, she returned to her aviation roots. As the daughter of a pilot with early career experience in computer-based pilot training and aircraft maintenance, she shifted her focus back to aviation. She is known for pioneering work in AI safety for aerial autonomy and leads the AIrTonomy initiative, which aims to build a cyber-physical proving ground for verifying and validating AI and machine learning safety in autonomous aviation. Additionally, she pioneered Purdue IronHacks (www.ironhacks.com), an iterative hacking initiative that promotes experiential learning at Purdue University.

Her contributions have been recognized with numerous awards throughout her career. In 2012, she received the Best Dissertation Award from the Association of Production Research (FpF) in Stuttgart, and was recognized as Top Researcher 2012 by the Fraunhofer Society for her accomplishments in open innovation. She later received the Runner-up Emerging Scholar Award from the World Open Innovation Conference at ESADE Business School, Spain, and the John P. Lisack Early-Career Engagement Award from Purdue Polytechnic Institute. In 2023, she was invited to serve as a Steering Committee Member of the Institute for Physical Artificial Intelligence (IPAI) by the Executive Vice President for Research (EVPR) at Purdue University, further recognizing her expertise in the field.

== Selected publications (book chapters) ==
- Brunswicker, S. (2024). 833 Teaching Engineers About Open Innovation. In The Oxford Handbook of Open Innovation (pp. 833–846). Oxford University Press.
- Kremser, W., Pentland, B., & Brunswicker, S. (2019). The Continuous Transformation of Interdependence in Networks of Routines. In Book Series: Research in Sociology of Organizations. Emerald Insight, invited publication.
- Brunswicker, S., Majchrzak, A., Almirall, E., & Tee, R. (2016). Co-creating value from open data: from incentivizing developers to inducing co-creation in open data ecosystems. In S. Nambisan (Ed.): Open Innovation and Innovation Networks (Vol. 1). World Scientific Publishing.
- Brunswicker, S. (2016). Managing open innovation in small and medium-sized firms in the tourism sector. In W. Egger, I. Gula, & D. Walcher (Eds.), Open tourism: Open innovation, crowdsourcing, and collaborative consumption challenging the tourism industry. Berlin: Springer.
- Bagherzadeh, M., & Brunswicker, S. (2016). Governance of Knowledge Flows in Open Exploration: The Role of Behavioral Control. In Das, T.K. (Ed.), Decision Making in Behavioral Strategy (DMBS), Information Age Publishing (IAP).
- Brunswicker, S., & Johnson, J. (2015). From governmental open data toward governmental open innovation (GOI). In D. Archibugi & A. Filippetti (Eds.), The handbook of global science, technology, and innovation (1 ed., pp. 504–524): New Jersey: John Wiley & Sons, Ltd. 2
- Brunswicker, S., & van de Vrande, V. (2014). Exploring open innovation in small and medium-sized enterprises. In H. Chesbrough, W. Vanhaverbeke, & J. West (Eds.), New frontiers in open innovation (1 ed., pp. 135–156). Oxford, United Kingdom: Oxford University Press.

== Selected publications (referred journals) ==
- Brunswicker, Sabine, & Prietula, M. (2025). Harnessing the crowd: Insights from an agent-based model of collective digital innovation. International Journal of Information Management, 85(December 2025), 102960. https://doi.org/10.1016/j.ijinfomgt.2025.102960
- Wei-Hao Chen, Jia Lin Cheoh, Manthan Keim, Sabine Brunswicker, and Tianyi Zhang. 2025. Towards Understanding Fine-Grained Programming Mistakes and Fixing Patterns in Data Science. Proc. ACM Softw. Eng. 2, FSE, Article FSE082 (July 2025), 23 pages. https://doi.org/10.1145/3729352
- Brunswicker, S., Zhang, Y., Rashidian, C., & Linna, D. W. (2025). Trust through words: The systemize-empathize-effect of language in task-oriented conversational agents. Computers in Human Behavior, 165, 108516. https://doi.org/10.1016/j.chb.2024.108516
- Brunswicker, S., Goppert, J., Gough, E., Lercel, D., Hwang, I., Kong, N., ... & Scherer, S. (2025). AIrTonomy: An Experimental Infrastructure for Testing Next-Generation Autonomous Aerial Vehicles. In AIAA AVIATION FORUM AND ASCEND 2025 (p. 3047).
- Deng, C., Sribunma, W., Brunswicker, S., Goppert, J. M., & Hwang, I. (2025). 3D Path Planning With Weather Forecasts, Ground Risks, and Airspace Information for UAV Mid-Mile Delivery. In AIAA SCITECH 2025 Forum (p. 1806).
- Sribunma, W., Lin, L. Y., Goppert, J. M., & Brunswicker, S. (2025). Towards Safety Verification of Total Energy Control System for Fixed-Wing Vehicles. In AIAA SCITECH 2025 Forum (p. 1999).
- Sribunma, W., Lin, L. Y., Pant, K. A., Deng, C., Goppert, J. M., Brunswicker, S., & Roberts, J. (2024, October). Mixed-Reality Testbed for Autonomous Fixed-Wing UAVs Human-Autonomy Teaming. In 2024 International Conference on Assured Autonomy (ICAA) (pp. 94–97). IEEE.
- Tsapparellas, K., Jelev, N., Waters, J., Shrikhande, A. M., Brunswicker, S., & Mihaylova, L. S. (2024). A versatile real-time vision-led runway localisation system for enhanced autonomy. Frontiers in Robotics and AI, 11, 1490812.
- Nyamathi A, Dutt N, Lee JA, Rahmani AM, Rasouli M, Krogh D, Krogh E, Sultzer D, Rashid H, Liaqat H, Jawad R, Azhar F, Ahmad A, Qamar B, Bhatti TY, Khay C, Ludlow J, Gibbs L, Rousseau J, Abbasian M, Song Y, Jeong C, Brunswicker S. Establishing the Foundations of Emotional Intelligence in Care Companion Robots to Mitigate Agitation Among High-Risk Patients With Dementia: Protocol for an Empathetic Patient-Robot Interaction Study. JMIR Res Protoc 2024;13:e55761
- K. Tsapparellas, N. Jelev, J. Waters, S. Brunswicker and L. S. Mihaylova, "Vision-based Runway Detection and Landing for Unmanned Aerial Vehicle Enhanced Autonomy," 2023 IEEE International Conference on Mechatronics and Automation (ICMA), Harbin, Heilongjiang, China, 2023, pp. 239–246, doi: 10.1109/ICMA57826.2023.10215523.
- Brunswicker, S., Haefliger, S., & Majchrzak, A. (2023). The Effects of Human and Machine Feedback on Productivity in Innovation Communities. In Academy of Management Proceedings (Vol. 2023, No. 1, p. 12550). Briarcliff Manor, NY 10510: Academy of Management.
- Wang, C., Brunswicker, S., & Majchrzak, A. (2021). Knowledge search breadth and depth and OI projects performance: a moderated mediation model of control mechanism. Journal of Knowledge Management, 25(4), 847–870.
- Brunswicker, S., & Schecter, A. (2019). Coherence or flexibility? The paradox of change for developers’ digital innovation trajectory on open platforms. Research Policy, 48(8), 103771.
- Brunswicker, S., Priego, L. P., & Almirall, E. (2019). Transparency in policy making: A complexity view. Government Information Quarterly, 36(3), 571–591.
- Kremser, W., Pentland, B. T., & Brunswicker, S. (2019). Interdependence within and between routines: A performative perspective. In Routine dynamics in action: Replication and transformation (pp. 79–98). Emerald Publishing Limited.
- Brunswicker, S., Almirall, E., & Majchrzak, A. (2019). Optimizing and Satisficing. MIS quarterly, 43(4), 1249-A17.
- Bagherzadeh, M., Gurca, A., & Brunswicker, S. (2019). Problem types and open innovation governance modes: a project-level empirical exploration. IEEE Transactions on Engineering Management, 69(2), 287–301.
- Brunswicker, S., & Chesbrough, H. (2018). The Adoption of Open Innovation in Large Firms: Practices, Measures, and Risks. Research Technology Management.
- Brunswicker, S., Bilgram, V., & Fueller, J. (2017). Taming wicked civic challenges with an innovative crowd. Business Horizons, 60(2), Bogers, M., Zobel, A.-K., Afuah, A., Almirall, E., Brunswicker, S., Dahlander, L., ... Magnussen, M. (2017). The Open Innovation Landscape: Established Perspectives and Emerging Themes Across Different Levels of Analysis. Industry & Innovation, 24(1), 8–40.
- Brunswicker, S., Matei, S. A., Zentner, M., Zentner, L., & Klimeck, G. (2017). Creating impact in the digital space: digital practice dependency in communities of digital scientific innovations. Scientometrics, 110(1), 417–426.
- Brunswicker, S., & Vanhaverbeke, W. (2015). Open innovation in small and medium-sized enterprises (SMEs): External knowledge sourcing strategies and internal organizational facilitators. Journal of Small Business Management, 53(4), 1241–1263.
- Brunswicker, S., Bertino, E., & Matei, S. (2015). Big data for open digital innovation – A research roadmap. Big Data Research, 2(2), 53–58. Chesbrough, H., & Brunswicker, S. (2014). A Fad or a Phenomenon? The Adoption of Open Innovation Practices in Large Firms. Research Technology Management, 57(2), 16–25.
- Koch, G., Füller, J., & Brunswicker, S. (2011). Online crowdsourcing in the public sector: How to design open government platforms. Online Communities and Social Computing, 6778, 203–212. doi:10.1007/978-3-642-21796-8_22
- Brunswicker, S., & Hutschek, U. (2010). Crossing horizons: Leveraging cross-industry innovation search in the front-end of the innovation process. International Journal of Innovation Management, 14(04), 683–702.

== Research grants ==
- 08/2016 to 07/2017 Balancing the Grid through Energy Monitoring Systems: Information Visualization for Collective Awareness; Deans Graduate Assistant Award for Outstanding Research Proposals; $20,000; Principal Investigator
- 08/2016 to 10/2016 Biomedical Big Data Hacking for Civic Health Awareness; NIH grant; $2000; Co-Principal Investigator (with Bethany McGowan as Principal Investigator) 07/2015-06/2017 Creating Impact from Governmental Open Data (OD): Innovation Process Transparency in OD Contest Design; NSF grant; Science of Science and Innovation Policy (SciPI); 24 months grant; $238,641,29; Principal Investigator (with Ann Majchrzak, USC as Co-Principal Investigator)
- 06/2015 – 05/2017 Red Hat® Doctoral Researcher on Open Innovation Communities; Donation received from Red Hat Inc., Raleigh, North Carolina $100,000; Principal Investigator
- 04/2015 to 12/2016 Managing Open Innovation in Large Firms: Case Study Analysis; Sponsored Research Project; Sponsor: Accenture High Performance Institute\f; Chicago; $63,531,32 Principal Investigator 01/2015-08/2015 Conceptualization of the Social and Innovation Opportunities of Data Analysis; NSF grant; CIF21 DIBBS; 7months grant; $99,718; Co-Principal Investigator (with Mike Zentner; Principal Investigator; Purdue University)
- 07/2014 – 11/215 Global Open Innovation Executive Survey 2015; Sponsored Research Grant; Sponsor: University of Berkeley, Garwood Center for Corporate Innovation; $25,000; Principal Investigator
- 03/2015 – Present Open Innovation Community Research; Donation received from Landcare Research, Gerald Street, Lincoln, New Zealand 7608; $10,000 Principal Investigator (with Jeremiah Johnson and Ann Majchrzak)
- 2014 Research on CyberInfrastructures and Behavioral analytics, Purdue Internal Funding through nanoHUB.org NCN supported RCODI discovery efforts of a doctoral student with $18,201. Principal Investigator
- 2014-2015 Exploratory research in the social sciences; $50,000. Executive office of the Vice President (EVPR) Co-Principal Investigator (with Sorin Matei, Curriculum Vitae – April 2016 16 Communications and Gerhard Klimeck, ECE) $22,496.
- 2014 Open Strategies; Internal Funding from PCRD (Purdue Center for Regional Development); $10,066; Principal Investigator
