= Bruce A. Craig =

American statistician and academic

- Citizenship: American
- Education: Washington University in St. Louis; University of Wisconsin-Madison
- Scientific career
- Fields: Statistics
- Workplaces: Purdue University
- Doctoral advisor: Michael Abbott Newton
- Doctoral students: Olga Vitek

Bruce A. Craig is an American statistician and academic, recognized for his work in statistical consulting and the development of novel statistical methodologies, particularly within the life sciences. He is a Professor of Statistics and the Director of the Statistical Consulting Service (SCS) at Purdue University. Craig is a Fellow of both the American Statistical Association (ASA) and the American Association for the Advancement of Science (AAAS).

== Education ==
Craig earned a B.S. in Mathematics and Economics from Washington University in St. Louis in 1989. He then enrolled at the University of Wisconsin-Madison, earning his M.S. and Ph.D. in Statistics in 1991 and 1996 respectively. His doctoral advisor was Michael Abbott Newton and dissertation was entitled "Analysis of Hidden Markov Models via Markov Chain Monte Carlo."

== Career and research ==
As of 2025, he is a Professor in the Department of Statistics at Purdue University. Since 2005 he has also served as the Director of the Statistical Consulting Service (SCS), which provides statistical experimental design and other statistical consulting support to university researchers.

Craig's research focuses on developing and applying new statistical methodologies to address complex problems, primarily in the life sciences. His specific areas of interest include:

- Bayesian hierarchical modeling: the use of Bayesian statistical methods to describe and account for the heterogeneity in complex data sets.
- Diagnostic testing: methods for evaluating the accuracy and effectiveness of diagnostic tests.
- Bioinformatics and related disciplines, including genomics, nutrition, proteomics, and statistical genetics.
- Computational statistics such as Markov chain Monte Carlo (MCMC) techniques for statistical inference.
- Abundance estimation: including non-invasive capture-recapture modeling.

He has published at least 194 peer-reviewed articles across a range of scientific and statistical journals. He is also the co-author of several introductory textbooks, including Introduction to the Practice of Statistics, which integrates real-world data and experience from the Statistical consulting Service.

== Awards and honors ==
- Purdue University Faculty Scholar (2005)
- Chair, ASA Section on Statistical Consulting (2008)
- Fellow of the American Statistical Association (2011)
- Fellow of the American Association for the Advancement of Science (2015)
- College of Science Outstanding Service Award (2022)

== Selected publications ==
- Moore, David S., George P. McCabe, and Bruce A. Craig. Introduction to the Practice of Statistics. W.H. Freeman.
- Running, C. A., Craig, B. A., and Mattes, R. D. (2015). Oleogustus: the unique taste of fat. Chemical Senses, 40(7), 507–516.
- DePalma, G., Xu, H., Covinsky, K. E., Craig, B. A., Stallard, E., Thomas III, J., and Sands, L.P. (2013). Hospital readmission among older adults who return home with unmet need for ADL disability. The Gerontologist, 53(3), 454–461.
- Gerber, E. A. E., and Craig, B. A. (2021). A mixed effects multinomial logistic-normal model for forecasting baseball performance. Journal of Quantitative Analysis in Sports, 17(3), 221-239.
