= Olga Vitek =

Biostatistician and computer scientist

- Education: Purdue University
- Scientific career
- Fields: biostatistics, mass spectrometry, proteomics
- Workplaces: Northeastern University
- Thesis: An inferential approach to protein backbone nuclear magnetic resonance assignment (2005)
- Doctoral advisor: Bruce A. Craig and Chris Bailey-Kellogg

Olga Vitek is a biostatistician and computer scientist specializing in bioinformatics, proteomics, mass spectrometry, causal inference of biological function, and the development of open-source software for statistical analysis in these areas. She is a professor in the College of Science and Khoury College of Computer Sciences of Northeastern University.

== Education and career ==
Vitek earned a bachelor's degree in econometrics and statistics from the University of Geneva in 1995, and a master's degree in 1996. She earned a second master's degree in mathematical statistics at Purdue University in 2001, and completed her PhD at Purdue in 2005. As a graduate student, she interned with Eli Lilly and Company; her 2005 doctoral dissertation, An Inferential Approach to Protein Backbone Nuclear Magnetic Resonance Assignment, was jointly supervised by statistician Bruce A. Craig and computer scientist Chris Bailey-Kellogg.

After postdoctoral research with Ruedi Aebersold at the Institute for Systems Biology in Seattle, Vitek joined the Purdue University faculty in 2006, with a joint appointment in the departments of statistics and computer science. She moved to Northeastern University in 2014, where she held the title of Sy and Laurie Sternberg Interdisciplinary Associate Professor before being promoted to full professor.

She serves as council member for the Human Proteome Organization, board of director for the US Human Proteome Organization, and president of the American Statistical Association Boston Chapter. She is a founding committee member of Computational Mass Spectrometry (CompMS). She is an editorial board member of Molecular and Cellular Proteomics, and associate editor of Bioinformatics.

== Research ==
Vitek's research contributions include work with David E. Salt at Purdue University on genetic adaptations allowing plants to tolerate salt, and a study debunking earlier claims that some programming languages cause their users to write buggier code than other languages. She leads the project MSstats with Meena Choi and the project Cardinal with Kylie Bemis to develop open-sourced statistical software for mass spectrometry analyses, funded by the Essential Open Source Software for Science program of the Chan Zuckerberg Initiative.

== Recognition ==
Vitek was named a Fellow of the American Statistical Association in 2021. She received the Gilbert S. Omenn Computational Proteomics Award from the US Human Proteome Organization, and the Indigo BioAutomation FeMS Distinguished Contribution Award in 2021.
