= Alok R. Chaturvedi =

American computer scientist

- Education: Birla Institute of Technology, Mesra (B.Sc.), University of Wisconsin–Milwaukee (M.S., Ph.D.)
- Known for: SEAS Laboratory, Sentient World Simulation, Wargaming
- Awards: Sagamore of the Wabash (2005)
- Scientific career
- Fields: Information systems, Artificial intelligence, Computational ecology, Enterprise integration
- Workplaces: Purdue University, Simulex Inc., Purdue Homeland Security Institute

Alok R. Chaturvedi is a professor of information systems and the founder and the director of SEAS Laboratory at the Krannert School of Management, Purdue University. His research is focused on using artificial intelligence, computational ecology, and enterprise integration for wargaming enterprise situations. He received a Ph.D. (1989) and M.S (1985) in Management Information Systems from the University of Wisconsin–Milwaukee and a B.Sc. (1980) in Mechanical Engineering from B.I.T Ranchi (India).

Alok R. Chaturvedi is also:

- the director of Purdue Homeland Security Institute, United States;
- the founder, chairman, and the CEO of Simulex Inc.;
- the technical lead for the Sentient World Simulation project initiated by US Joint Forces Command;
- the principal investigator and the project director for several major grants from National Science Foundation, Indiana 21st Century Research and Technology Fund, Office of Naval Research and others.

In 2005, he was awarded the Sagamore of the Wabash by the Governor of Indiana, the highest civilian honor which the Governor of Indiana bestows for his service to the state. He has also served as an adjunct research staff member at the Institute for Defense Analyses.

== See also ==
- Chaturvedi
- Social simulation
- Simulated reality
