= Rapid Equipping Force =

US Army Rapid Equipping Force
- Active: 2002-2021
- Country: United States of America
- Branch: U.S. Army
- Part of: United States Army Training and Doctrine Command (TRADOC)
- Headquarters: Fort Belvoir
- Website: https:// www.ref.army.mil

Commanders
- Director: COL Joe D. Bookard

The Rapid Equipping Force (REF) was a United States Army organization headquartered in Fort Belvoir, Virginia. The organization was charged with quickly providing Army units deployed globally with innovative government off-the-shelf and commercially available solutions that address urgent requirements within 180 days or less. The REF was able to do this through unique authorities and by maintaining a presence near the point of need. REF personnel were positioned in Iraq, Afghanistan, and Kuwait and mobile laboratories are available for quick solutions. Additionally, the REF empowered the Army at a grassroots level, enabling individual soldiers to communicate needs directly through simple request forms.

Along with leveraging existing technology to meet urgent needs of Army forces deployed globally, the REF also informed longer-term materiel development for the future force. In October 2020, the Army announced it would dissolve the Asymmetric Warfare Group and the Rapid Equipping Force, by year-end FY2021 (September 30, 2021).

== Mission ==
The REF provides innovative materiel solutions to meet the urgent requirements of U.S. Army forces employed globally, informs materiel development for the future force, and on order expands to meet operational demands.

== Functions ==
The REF lines of support fall into four distinct categories: assess, equip, insert, and inform. Its primary function is to equip units with technologies that fill identified capability gaps. The REF provides training on these technologies downrange and at home-stations. It can insert selected future force solutions for operational evaluation in addition to providing new capabilities not readily available in the existing Army inventory. Finally, the REF constantly identifies and assesses emerging technologies and Army practices concerning operational needs affecting force readiness.

== Organization overview ==
The REF is structured to integrate three distinct functions to provide the Army with a responsive, rapid acquisition organization. First, the REF Director has the unique authority to validate requirements. Second, the REF has acquisition authority and provided by the United States Assistant Secretary of the Army for Acquisition, Logistics, and Technology chartered Project Manager housed within REF's chain of command. Finally, the REF receives funding from a variety of sources, allowing it the flexibility to support Soldiers deployed around the world.

These three pillars of authority allow REF to quickly insert solutions into theater in weeks rather than years. REF aims to deliver items into Soldiers’ hands within 90 days, and has even provided a solution in 72 hours after learning of an urgent need.

The REF can receive requests for support from any soldier, from a private to the Chief of Staff of the Army. These requests are submitted via a simple document called a "10-Liner" that prompts soldiers to describe the capability gaps they are facing downrange or as they prepare to deploy. From that information, the REF team begins the analysis and procurement process in order to best equip the requesting unit.

The REF equips specific units, not the entirety of the Army. If a solution is applicable to a larger portion of the Army, REF works with partner organizations to transition technologies to project managers who can then field the equipment to a larger portion of the Army.

== History ==
The REF was created in 2002 after U.S. soldiers realized the need for non-standard equipment to meet the demands of new terrain, warfare tactics and their assigned missions.

The 2004 REF Charter and Implementation Guidance and Coordination memo, signed by Lieutenant General Richard A. Cody, formalized REF's "equip," "insert," "assess" functions. The excerpt below outlines how each line of support would shape REF's mission.

"The REF will identify and evaluate emerging technologies, concepts, and surrogates to estimate/approximate threshold capabilities, while simultaneously providing operationally relevant capabilities to our combat forces within a time frame relevant to current operations... It is my intent to insert critical future technologies and capabilities into the current force while continuously shaping the future force and accelerating its evolution. Therefore, I direct expansion of the mission of the REF to encompass two additional critical functions:

1. First, the REF will analyze relevant technologies and capabilities that exist in the Army's laboratory, developmental systems, other Services and Federal Agencies, and international sources, and when appropriate, bring these capabilities into an operational environment to examine and evaluate the concepts and their effectiveness. If suitable, the REF will assess the potential to accelerate fielding and the contribution such fielding would make to increased combat effectiveness.
2. Second, REF initiatives will serve as the testbed to construct a model for lasting change and improvement of Army business practices and to better streamline Army Acquisition processes. Establish a continuous feedback process to provide lessons learned and best practices identified through the rapid equipping process to the relevant staff and US Army Major Command (MACOMs). The Army Acquisition Executive (AAE), with the support of the REF, will use REF initiatives to develop a process to transfer REF initiatives to a fast-tracked fielding program of selected systems. The Assistant Secretary of the Army, Financial Management and Comptroller, in coordination with the Chief of Legislative Liaison and the REF, will develop a concept and Congressional strategy to support significant Army reprogramming actions and request modifications to laws as necessary to facilitate rapid acquisition when acceleration of future technologies contribute significant combat power to the force in the near term."

In January 2014, the REF was deemed critical by the Army and transitioned to the U.S. Army Training and Doctrine Command.

=== Discontinuation ===
On October 2, 2020, the Department of the Army announced the discontinuation of the REF as the U.S. Army transitions from counter-insurgency operations to a focus on multi-domain operations and large scale combat operations. TRADOC directed the orderly closure of REF facilities, transfer of equipment and property, and transition of military and civilian personnel (to support other army efforts).

== Projects ==
The REF mitigates capability gaps across the spectrum of warfighter function areas and has supported many projects as listed below.

- PackBot: Remote-Controlled, full sensor package capable tracked vehicle.
- Magnetometer: Commercial off the Shelf (COTS) ultra-sensitive metal detecting wand.
- Wellcam: Complete man-portable video system to search wells.
- Armor Kit: 4-door vehicle protection kit equipped to units during Operation Iraqi Freedom.
- PILAR: Acoustically based, fully passive system that determines sniper fire direction on LCD screen.
- Talon Robot: A man-portable robot used for the disposal of IEDs and other dangerous explosives.
- Boomerang Counter-Fire Detection: A gunfire locator that uses microphone sensors to detect where shots originate.
- Minotaur: A robotic loader with front mine rollers to support dismounted operations.
- Raven: A hand-launched, remote controlled unmanned aerial vehicle for surveillance.
- Tactical Aerostats: Smaller aerostats used as ISR and communications platforms.
- Pole Cam: Extendable pole-mounted camera with a handheld receiver.
- Rapid Deployment Integrated Surveillance System (RDISS): System to monitor movement near remote FOBs and COPs.
- Man-Portable Line Charge (MPLC): Backpack-packaged clearing charge to disrupt IED trigger mechanisms.

The REF currently supports priority equipping efforts over a wide range of challenges including solutions for subterranean operations, electronic warfare, unmanned and counter-unmanned aerial systems, intelligence, and expeditionary force protection.
