= Synthetic Environment for Analysis and Simulations =

Simulated environment

Purdue University's Synthetic Environment for Analysis and Simulations, or SEAS, sometimes referred to and reported on as Sentient World Simulation, is currently being used by the US Department of Homeland Security and the US Department of Defense to simulate crises on the US mainland. SEAS "enables researchers and organizations to try out their models or techniques in a publicly known, realistically detailed environment." It "is now capable of running real-time simulations for up to 62 nations, including Iraq, Afghanistan, and China. The simulations gobble up breaking news, census data, economic indicators, and climactic events in the real world, along with proprietary information such as military intelligence. [...] The Iraq and Afghanistan computer models are the most highly developed and complex of the 62 available to JFCOM-J9. Each has about five million individual nodes representing things such as hospitals, mosques, pipelines, and people."

SEAS was developed to help Fortune 500 companies with strategic planning. Then it was used to help "recruiting commanders to strategize ways to improve recruiting potential soldiers". In 2004 SEAS was evaluated for its ability to help simulate "the non-kinetic aspects of combat, things like the diplomatic, economic, political, infrastructure and social issues".

Sentient World Simulation is the name given to the current vision of making SEAS a "continuously running, continually updated mirror model of the real world that can be used to predict and evaluate future events and courses of action."

== Development and use ==
SEAS technology resulted from over ten years of research at Purdue University, funded by the Department of Defense, several Fortune 500 companies, the National Science Foundation, the Century Fund of the state of Indiana, and the Office of Naval Research. Originally, SEAS was developed to help Fortune 500 companies with strategic planning. It was also used to model the population of the U.S. that is eligible for military service to help "recruiting commanders to strategize ways to improve recruiting potential soldiers" and to study biological attacks.

In January 2004 SEAS was evaluated by the Joint Innovation and Experimentation Directorate (J9) of the US Joint Forces Command (JFCOM) for its ability to help simulate "the non-kinetic aspects of combat, things like the diplomatic, economic, political, infrastructure and social issues" at the Purdue Technology Park during Breaking Point 2004, an environment-shaping war game resulting in the conclusion that it "moves us from the current situation where everyone comes together and sits around a table discussing what they would do, to a situation where they actually play in the simulation and their actions have consequences."

In 2006 JFCOM-J9 used SEAS to war game warfare scenarios for Baghdad in 2015. In April 2007 JFCOM-J9 began working with Homeland Security and multinational forces in a homeland defense war gaming exercise.

== Sentient World Simulation ==
The Sentient World Simulation project (SWS) is to be based on SEAS. The ultimate goal envisioned by Alok R. Chaturvedi on March 10, 2006 was for SWS to be a "continuously running, continually updated mirror model of the real world that can be used to predict and evaluate future events and courses of action. SWS will react to actual events that occur anywhere in the world and incorporate newly sensed data from the real world. [...] As the models influence each other and the shared synthetic environment, behaviors and trends emerge in the synthetic world as they do in the real world. Analysis can be performed on the trends in the synthetic world to validate alternate worldviews. [...] Information can be easily displayed and readily transitioned from one focus to another using detailed modeling, such as engineering level modeling, to aggregated strategic, theater, or campaign-level modeling."

== Personnel ==
Alok R. Chaturvedi is the founder and the Director of SEAS Laboratory as well as the technical lead for the Sentient World Simulation project initiated by US Joint Forces Command.

== See also ==
- Simulex Inc.
- ECHELON
- Information Awareness Office
- List of notable artificial intelligence projects
- Multi-agent system
- NSA warrantless surveillance controversy
- Sentient (intelligence analysis system)
- Simulated reality
- Social simulation
- Synthetic psychological environment
