= Michael A. Newton =

Canadian statistician (born 1964)

Michael Abbott Newton (born July 19, 1964, Baddeck, Nova Scotia) is a Canadian statistician. He is a professor in the Department of Statistics and the Department of Biostatistics and Medical Informatics at the University of Wisconsin–Madison, and he received the COPSS Presidents' Award in 2004. He has written many research papers about the statistical analysis of cancer biology, including linkage analysis and signal identification.

Newton received his B.Sc. in mathematics and statistics from Dalhousie University in 1986, and his PhD in statistics from the University of Washington, Seattle in 1991 (under the supervision of Adrian E. Raftery).

In 2003 Newton won the Spiegelman Award (presented annually by the American Public Health Association to an outstanding public health statistician under age 40). He was elected a fellow of the American Statistical Association in 2007. Newton gave a Presidential Invited Address at the International Biometric Society WNAR (Western North American Region) conference in 2002 and was an IMS Medallion Lecturer in 2011. In 1997, Newton was awarded the George W. Snedecor Award by the Committee of Presidents of Statistical Societies.
