= Djelal Kadir =

American literary scholar (born 1946)

- Born: 1946 (age 79–80); Cyprus
- Title: Edwin Erle Sparks Professor of Comparative Literature, Emeritus

Academic background
- Education: Yale University (BA); University of New Mexico (PhD)

Academic work
- Discipline: Comparative literature
- Sub-discipline: World literature American studies Latin American literature
- Institutions: University of Nevada, Reno; Purdue University; University of Oklahoma; Pennsylvania State University
- Notable works: Comparative History of Latin American Literary Cultures (co-editor); Memos from the Besieged City; Literature: A World History (editor, vol. 4)

Djelal Kadir (born 1946) is a Cypriot-born American comparatist and literary scholar who is Edwin Erle Sparks Professor of Comparative Literature, Emeritus, at Pennsylvania State University. His work has focused on world literature, the literatures of the Americas, and literary and cultural theory. He was the Walter and Dolores K. Neustadt Distinguished Professor of Comparative Literature at the University of Oklahoma and editor of the journal World Literature Today in the 1990s. Kadir is the founding president of the International American Studies Association and has contributed to collaborative reference projects including the three-volume Comparative History of Latin American Literary Cultures and Literature: A World History.

== Early life and education ==
Kadir was born in 1946 in Cyprus. He earned a Bachelor of Arts degree from Yale University in 1969 and a PhD in comparative literature from the University of New Mexico in 1972.

== Academic career ==
Kadir began his academic career as a visiting instructor of Portuguese at the University of Nevada, Reno in 1971–1972. He joined the faculty of Purdue University in 1973, where he taught comparative literature and related subjects until 1991 and served as director of comparative literature.

In 1991 he moved to the University of Oklahoma as Walter and Dolores K. Neustadt Distinguished Professor of Comparative Literature. While there he also served as editor of World Literature Today and as chair of the jury for the Neustadt International Prize for Literature.

In 1998 Kadir joined Pennsylvania State University as Edwin Erle Sparks Professor of Comparative Literature, a named chair in the College of the Liberal Arts. He taught there until his retirement in 2016, after which he became professor emeritus.

== Editorial work and professional service ==
As editor of World Literature Today from 1991 to 1997, Kadir oversaw special issues on postcolonial writers and on literary cultures undergoing political and historical change, including post-apartheid South African literature, post-Soviet Central Asian literatures, and contemporary Australian literature, some produced in collaboration with UNESCO. He has also guest-edited thematic issues of journals such as PMLA, Neohelicon and Comparative Literature Studies.

Kadir was a founding figure in international American studies. In 2000 he became the founding president of the International American Studies Association, an organization created to promote comparative and transnational approaches to the study of the Americas. He has served on boards of international organizations including Synapsis: The European School of Comparative Studies, the Stockholm Collegium of World Literary History, and led several initiatives at the Institute for World Literature at Harvard University.

In the 1990s he served on the Oklahoma Arts Council and received the state's Marilyn Douglas Memorial Award for his contributions to the arts.

== Scholarship ==
=== American studies and the Americas ===
Kadir's work has engaged extensively with the literatures and cultures of the Americas. His early monographs Questing Fictions: Latin America's Family Romance (1986) and Columbus and the Ends of the Earth: Europe's Prophetic Rhetoric as Conquering Ideology (1992) examined narrative, colonialism and historical imagination in Latin American fiction and European accounts of the New World.

In 2003 he published the essay "Introduction: America and Its Studies" in a special issue of PMLA devoted to American studies. The article argued for an international and comparative framework for the field, emphasizing the plurality of "Americas" and the global circulation of Americanist discourse. According to Google Scholar, it has been cited in more than eighty scholarly publications in American studies and comparative literature. The founding charter of the International American Studies Association cites this transnational perspective as central to the association's mission.

Kadir co-edited the three-volume Comparative History of Latin American Literary Cultures (2004) with Mario J. Valdés. The project organizes Latin American literary history into interacting "frames," "synopses" and "scenes" rather than linear national periods, combining literary analysis with social and cultural history. An assessment by the International Comparative Literature Association described the series as a landmark in collaborative literary historiography that challenged conventional national narratives. A library guide from Gustavus Adolphus College notes that the volumes highlight cultural perspectives, genres and forms—including sermons and popular culture—that had previously received limited academic attention.

=== World literature and comparative literature ===
Kadir has published widely on world literature, globalization and comparative literary theory. His book Memos from the Besieged City: Lifelines for Cultural Sustainability (2011) reflects on crises of culture, violence and global modernity. In essays such as "To World, To Globalize: Comparative Literature's Crossroads" and "Comparative Literature in an Age of Terrorism", he has discussed the challenges globalization poses for comparative literature as a discipline.

He has contributed to and helped organize large-scale reference works in world literary history. As a member of the Stockholm Collegium of World Literary History and the Institute for World Literature, he served as editor of volume 4 of Literature: A World History (2022), focusing on twentieth-century global literatures, and authored sections on the Americas. He is also a co-editor of The Routledge Companion to World Literature and of the multi-volume Longman Anthology of World Literature, used as a course text in world literature curricula.

In addition to his scholarship in English and Spanish, Kadir has translated the poetry of Brazilian writer João Cabral de Melo Neto into English for a volume in the Wesleyan Poetry Series. His essays and books have been translated into several languages, including Arabic, French, Italian, Polish, Spanish and Turkish.

In 2025 he published Solitude: Apocryphal Posts from Distant Archives, a meditation on the universal phenomena of solitude, writing, and reading, with thirty-nine illustrative epistles from cultures around the world, dating from classical antiquity to the twentieth century that give voice to dire predicaments of extreme solitude.

== Selected works ==
=== Monographs ===
- Juan Carlos Onetti (Twayne, 1977).
- Questing Fictions: Latin America's Family Romance (University of Minnesota Press, 1986).
- Columbus and the Ends of the Earth: Europe's Prophetic Rhetoric as Conquering Ideology (University of California Press, 1992).
- The Other Writing: Postcolonial Essays in Latin America's Writing Culture (Purdue University Press, 1993).
- Memos from the Besieged City: Lifelines for Cultural Sustainability (Stanford University Press, 2011).
- Solitude: Apocryphal Posts from Distant Archives (Ethics International Press, 2025).

=== Edited and co-edited volumes ===
- Triple Espera: Novelas Cortas de Hispanoamérica (Harcourt Brace, 1976).
- João Cabral de Melo Neto: Selected Poetry 1937–1990 (editor and translator; Wesleyan University Press, 1994).
- Other Modernisms in an Age of Globalization (co-editor; Winter Verlag, 2002).
- Comparative History of Latin American Literary Cultures (3 vols., co-editor; Oxford University Press, 2004).
- How Far Is America From Here? (co-editor; Rodopi, 2005).
- The Longman Anthology of World Literature (6 vols., co-editor; Pearson/Longman, 2004; 2nd ed. 2008).
- The Routledge Companion to World Literature (co-editor; Routledge, 2012; 2nd ed. 2023).
- Literature: A World History (4 vols.; editor, vol. 4; Wiley-Blackwell, 2022).

=== Selected articles and chapters ===
- "Introduction: America and Its Studies", PMLA 118, no. 1 (2003).
- "To World, To Globalize: Comparative Literature's Crossroads", Comparative Literature Studies 41, no. 1 (2004).
- "Defending America Against Its Devotees", Comparative American Studies 2, no. 2 (2004).
- "Comparative Literature in an Age of Terrorism", in Comparative Literature in an Age of Globalization (Johns Hopkins University Press, 2006).
- "To Compare, To World: Two Verbs, One Discipline", The Comparatist 34 (2010).
- "World Literature: The Allophone, the Differential, and the Common", Modern Language Quarterly 74, no. 4 (2013).
- "Plague, Pestilence, Pandemic: Keywords for a Cultural Epidemiology of the Present", Review of International American Studies (RIAS) 16 (Fall/Winter 2023).

== Awards and honors ==
Kadir has received a number of academic and cultural honors, including:

- Marilyn Douglas Memorial Award, Oklahoma Governor's Arts Awards (1996).
- College of the Liberal Arts Distinguished Service Medal, Pennsylvania State University (2007).
- Comparative Literature Faculty Teaching Award, Pennsylvania State University (2008).
- Fellowship at the Rockefeller Foundation Bellagio Center, Italy (2014).
- Distinguished Visiting Professor, Sapienza University of Rome (2016).
