= Shimon Y. Nof =

Shimon Y. Nof (Hebrew: שמעון נוף; born 1946) is a professor of Industrial Engineering at Purdue University in West Lafayette, Indiana. He has held visiting positions at the Massachusetts Institute of Technology and at universities in Chile, the European Union, Hong Kong, Israel, Japan, Mexico, Philippines, Taiwan, and UK. He is the Director of the Production, Robotics and Integration Software for the Manufacturing & Management (PRISM) Center at Purdue.

== Education ==
Nof received his B.Sc. in 1969 and M.Sc. in 1972 in Industrial Engineering & Management (Human-machine systems) from the Technion in Haifa, Israel, and his Ph.D. in Industrial & Operations Engineering (Production Analytics) from the University of Michigan, Ann Arbor, in 1976.

== Research and consulting work ==
Nof has conducted research on collaborative e-Work and e-Service in multi-enterprise networks, integrated production and service systems, and decision support — as well as design of cyber-physical systems for managing distributed activities by collaborative multi-agent teams. His research pioneered the development of knowledge-based, computer-integrated facility design and robotics control models. His current research focus is on computer-supported integration and collaboration of distributed e-work, robotics, and cyber-physical work. Nof has developed and teaches the courses "Industrial Robotics and Flexible Assembly", "Cyber Methods in Production Control", "Integrated Production Systems I and II", "I.E. Computing", and "Design of E-work, E-service, and CPS".

== Awards and recognition ==
In 1999, Nof was listed in the inaugural group of Purdue's Book of Great Teachers. In 2002, he was awarded the Engelberger Medal for Robotics Education. He is a Fellow of the Institute of Industrial and Systems Engineers (IISE), the former Chair of IFAC CC-Manufacturing and Logistics Systems; Fellow, former Secretary General and President of the IFPR (International Foundation of Production Research).

== Publications ==
Nof has published over 550 articles on production engineering, information and cyber technology, co-inventor of five patents, and is the co-author/editor of fourteen books, including the Handbook of Industrial Robotics (Wiley, 1985) and the International Encyclopedia of Robotics (Wiley, 1988), both winners of the "Most Outstanding Book in Science and Engineering" awards by the Association of American Publishers; Industrial Assembly (Chapman & Hall, 1997, the Handbook of Industrial Robotics (2nd edition), (Wiley, 1999), Springer Handbook of Automation (2009), Revolutionizing Collaboration Through e-Work, e-Business, and e-Service (Springer ACES Series, 2015), Best Matching: Theory & Application (Springer ACES Series, 2017), Dynamic Lines of Collaboration: Disruption Handling & Control (Springer ACES Series, 2020).
