= Joseph Paul Robinson =

Australian-American scientist and inventor

J. Paul Robinson
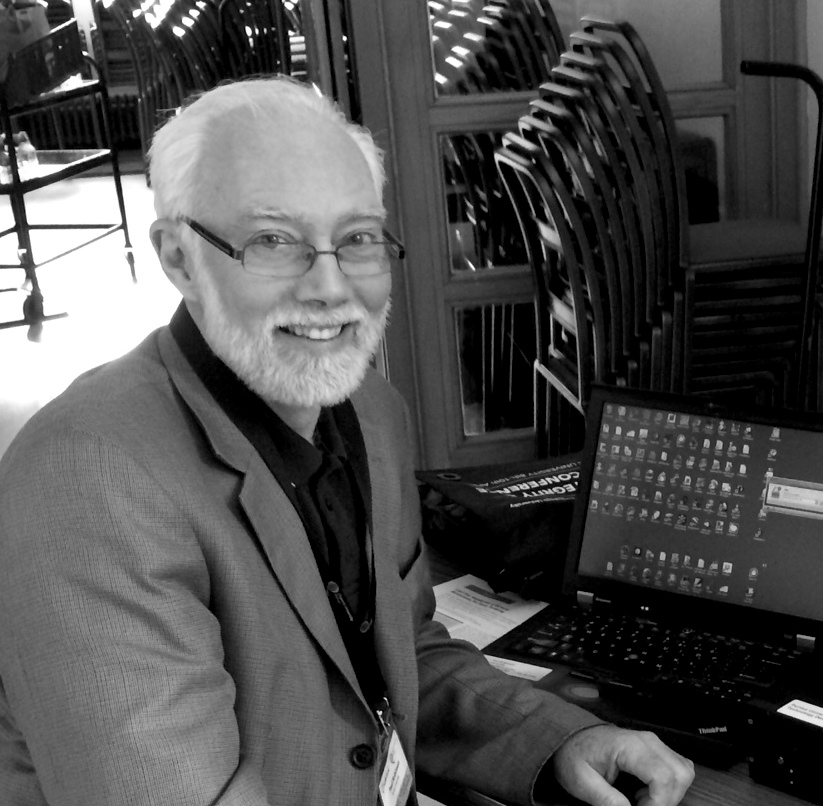
- Born: Joseph Paul Robinson; 1953 (age 72–73); Inverell, NSW, Australia
- Known for: spectral cytometry
- Title: Distinguished Professor of Cytometry
- Spouse: Susan C. Robinson (m. 1976)
- Children: Tim, Alissa, David

Academic background
- Education: University of New South Wales
- Thesis: The application of chemiluminescence to human blood cells: Microbial and biochemical ligand activation (1983)

Academic work
- Discipline: microbiology, immunology, cytometry
- Institutions: Purdue University College of Veterinary Medicine, Weldon School of Biomedical Engineering

J. Paul Robinson (ORCID 0000-0001-8383-3240) is an Australian/American educator, biologist, biomedical engineer, and expert in the applications of flow cytometry. He is a Distinguished Professor of Cytometry in the Purdue University College of Veterinary Medicine, Department of Basic Medical Sciences, a professor of Biomedical Engineering in the Weldon School of Biomedical Engineering, a professor of Computer and Information Management at Purdue University, an adjunct professor of Microbiology & Immunology at West Lafayette Center for Medical Education, Indiana University School of Medicine, and the Director of Purdue University Cytometry Laboratories.

== Early life and education ==
Robinson was born in 1953 in Inverell in New South Wales, Australia. J. P. Robinson's early education was in a small three-teacher school at Tambar Springs, New South Wales followed by Inverell High School. He took his BSc and MSc at the University of New South Wales, Kensington, New South Wales, where he was a member of the New College from 1975 before earning a doctorate from the Faculty of Medicine, St Vincent's Hospital, Sydney, University of New South Wales. He completed a postdoctoral fellowship at the University of Michigan Medical School working under the supervision of Dr. Peter A. Ward.

== Scientific expertise ==
Robinson's initial research centered primarily on reactive oxygen species in neutrophils and cell lines, such as HL-60 cells. His laboratory's research emphasis was on mitochondrial function and the role of the reactive oxygen species. In addition, he was engaged in the development of translational tools for improved cervical cancer diagnostics. In recent years, his research interests focused on bioengineering, including development of single-cell analysis technologies such as high-speed hyperspectral cytometry, optical tools for quantitative fluorescence measurement, and label-free organisms classification methods for general microbiology and biodefense applications, as well as high-content, high-throughput screening technologies

Robinson is the co-inventor of multiple patents in the areas of single cell analysis and technologies associated with fluorescence detection, elastic light scatter, bacteria detection, and laser microanalysis. Robinson was a member of the Purdue University engineering research team that developed spectral flow cytometry. This technology has been licensed by Sony Biotechnology and became a basis for the first commercial multispectral flow cytometry system introduced in 2012. In 2020 the spectral cytometry technology was licensed by Propel Labs (now ThermoFisher Scientific). Robinson is also a co-inventor of automated microbial classification systems using elastic laser light scatter. Another area of his work includes development of a new range of single photon detectors.

== Selected peer-reviewed publications ==
- Robinson, J. Paul, Leon H. Bruner, Carl-F. Bassoe, Jerry L. Hudson, Peter A. Ward, and Sem H. Phan. 1988. "Measurement of Intracellular Fluorescence of Human Monocytes Relative to Oxidative Metabolism." Journal of Leukocyte Biology 43 (4): 304–10. https://doi.org/10.1002/jlb.43.4.304.
- Carter, W O, P K Narayanan, and J P Robinson. 1994. "Intracellular Hydrogen Peroxide and Superoxide Anion Detection in Endothelial Cells." Journal of Leukocyte Biology 55 (2): 253–58. https://doi.org/10.1002/jlb.55.2.253.
- Brightman, A. O., B. P. Rajwa, J. E. Sturgis, M. E. McCallister, J. P. Robinson, and S. L. Voytik-Harbin. 2000. "Time-Lapse Confocal Reflection Microscopy of Collagen Fibrillogenesis and Extracellular Matrix Assembly in Vitro." Biopolymers 54 (3): 222–34. [https://doi.org/10.1002/1097-0282(200009)54:3<222::AID-BIP80>3.0.CO;2-K https://doi.org/10.1002/1097-0282(200009)54:3<222::AID-BIP80>3.0.CO;2-K].
- Roeder, Blayne A., Klod Kokini, Jennifer E. Sturgis, J. Paul Robinson, and Sherry L. Voytik-Harbin. 2002. "Tensile Mechanical Properties of Three-Dimensional Type I Collagen Extracellular Matrices with Varied Microstructure." Journal of Biomechanical Engineering 124 (2): 214–22. https://doi.org/10.1115/1.1449904.
- Li, Nianyu, Kathy Ragheb, Gretchen Lawler, Jennie Sturgis, Bartek Rajwa, J. Andres Melendez, and J. Paul Robinson. 2003. "Mitochondrial Complex I Inhibitor Rotenone Induces Apoptosis through Enhancing Mitochondrial Reactive Oxygen Species Production." Journal of Biological Chemistry 278 (10): 8516–25. https://doi.org/10.1074/jbc.M210432200.
- Li, Nianyu, Kathy Ragheb, Gretchen Lawler, Jennie Sturgis, Bartek Rajwa, J. Andres Melendez, and J. Paul Robinson. 2003. "DPI Induces Mitochondrial Superoxide-Mediated Apoptosis." Free Radical Biology and Medicine 34 (4): 465–77. https://doi.org/10.1016/S0891-5849(02)01325-4.
- Lu, Yiqing, Jiangbo Zhao, Run Zhang, Yujia Liu, Deming Liu, Ewa M. Goldys, Xusan Yang, et al. 2014. "Tunable Lifetime Multiplexing Using Luminescent Nanocrystals." Nature Photonics 8 (1): 32–36. https://doi.org/10.1038/nphoton.2013.322.

== Honors and awards ==
In 2002 Robinson received the Gamma Sigma Delta Award of Merit in Research. In 2003 he was elected to the College of Fellows, American Institute for Medical and Biological Engineering (AIMBE). In 2004 he received the Pfizer Foundation Scientific Innovation Award. In 2017 he received honoris causa doctorate from the Aix-Marseille Université, Marseille, France. In 2017 Robinson received College of Veterinary Medicine Excellence in Research Award. In 2019 he received the Distinguished Service Award from the International Society for the Advancement of Cytometry. In 2020 he was elected American Association for the Advancement of Science (AAAS) fellow. In December 2022 Robinson was named a fellow of the National Academy of Inventors (NAI). In January 2023 Robinson was announced as new Honorary Fellow of the Royal Microscopical Society.

== Service ==
In 2013 Robinson was elected as chair of the Purdue University Senate and worked closely with the newly elected president of Purdue University Mitch Daniels, who assumed the presidency of Purdue University in January 2014.

== Educational activities and outreach ==
Robinson is a past President of the International Society for Advancement of Cytometry. He is the Editor-in-Chief of Current Protocols in Cytometry He has previously served as an Associate Editor of Folia Histochemica et Cytobiologica and Cytometry Part A.

Robinson has established a not-for-profit charity, "Cytometry for Life" with the goal of providing low-cost CD4 screening technology to resource-poor areas, initially focusing on countries in Africa. The foundation activities include development of appropriate low-cost CD4 screening technology and the efforts in education and training in the field of cytometry, partnering with Africa International Biotechnology and Biomedical Conference (AIBBC).

== Hobbies ==
Robinson is an accomplished mountaineer summiting Mount Rainier, Denali, Manaslu and in Mount Everest as part of a team led by Russell Brice and organized by Himex.
