= Roger McCarthy =

American engineer

Roger L. McCarthy is an American engineer.

McCarthy graduated from the University of Michigan with undergraduate degrees in philosophy and mechanical engineering, then earned a master's, professional degree, and doctorate in mechanical engineering from the Massachusetts Institute of Technology. McCarthy worked for the consulting firm Exponent from 1978 to 2009.

McCarthy was elected a member of the United States National Academy of Engineering in 2004, and provided funding for the Roger L. McCarthy Professorship of Mechanical Engineering at the University of Michigan.
