= Lonnie Lee Van Zandt =

Lonnie L. Van Zandt
- Born: September 29, 1937; Bound Brook, New Jersey
- Died: July 20, 1995 (aged 57); West Lafayette, Indiana
- Education: Harvard University
- Scientific career
- Fields: Physics
- Workplaces: Purdue University
- Thesis: Some effects of static spin density waves on electrical transport (1964)
- Doctoral advisor: Albert Overhauser

Lonnie Lee Van Zandt (1937–1995) was a professor of physics at Purdue University in Indiana, USA.

Van Zandt participated in the formation of the molecular biological physics group at Purdue and studied the dynamics of dissolved DNA polymers. He also performed pioneering research on the effect of microwaves on DNA. His PhD thesis in Physics at Harvard University focused on the "Effects of Static Spin Density Waves on Electron Transport".

== Sources ==
- Purdue University molecular biology laboratory

== Selected publications ==
- JMHRE Fancy, TBRLL VanZandt "Unusual Crystal-field Energy Levels and Efficient Laser Properties of YV04: Nd", Solid State Research Feb 1966
- LL Van Zandt, JM Honig, JB Goodenough ""Resistivity and Magnetic Order in Ti2 O3 " Journal of Applied Physics 1968
- LL Van Zandt, JW Meyer "Theory of the Schwarz‐Hora Effect" Journal of Applied Physics 1970
- JM Honig, LL Van Zandt, RD Board, HE Weaver "Study of by X-Ray Photoelectron Spectroscopy" Physical Review B 1972
- C. F. Eagan; N. C. Koon; L. L. VanZandt "Magnetization of single crystal (Ti,V)2O3" AIP Conference Proceedings 29, 590–591 (1976)
- JE Keem, LL VanZandt, JM Honig "Influence of antiferromagnetic T‐domains on transport in pure NiO" - AIP Conference Proceedings, 1976
- LL Van Zandt, VK Saxena "Vibrational local modes in DNA polymer" Journal of Biomolecular Structure and Dynamics 1994
- EW Prohofsky, KC Lu, LL Van Zandt, BF Putnam "Breathing modes and induced resonant melting of the double helix" Physics Letters A 1979
- BF Putnam, LL Van Zandt, EW Prohofsky, WN Mei "Resonant and localized breathing modes in terminal regions of the DNA double helix" Biophysical Journal 1981
- MA Wittenauer, LL Van Zandt "Surface conduction versus bulk conduction in pure stoichiometric NiO crystals" Philosophical Magazine B 1982
- LL Van Zandt "Resonant microwave absorption by dissolved DNA" Physical Review Letters, 1986
- M. E. Davis and L. L. VanZandt "Microwave response of DNA in solution" Phys. Rev. A 1988
- VV Prabhu, WK Schroll, LL Van Zandt "Helical lattice vibrational modes in DNA" Physical Review 1988
- VV Prabhu, WK Schroll, LL Van Zandt… "Helical lattice vibrational modes in DNA" Physical Review 1988
- LL Van Zandt "DNA solitons with realistic parameter values" Physical Review A 1989
- VK Saxena, BH Dorfman, LL Van Zand "Identifying and interpreting spectral features of dissolved poly (dA)-poly (dT) DNA polymer in the high-microwave range" Physical Review A 1991
- Barry H. Dorfman, V. K. Saxena, Lonnie L. VanZandt "Dynamics of dissolved DNA polymers with counterions" Proc. SPIE Biomolecular Spectroscopy III, (1 May 1993)
