= John D. Axtell =

American geneticist (1934–2000)

John David Axtell (February 5, 1934 – December 2, 2000) was an American geneticist, Lynn Distinguished Professor of Agronomy, member of the National Academy of Sciences. Axtell received the Alexander von Humboldt Award in 1975, the Crop Science Research Award from the Crop Science Society of America in 1976, and the International Award for Distinguished Service to Agriculture in 1984. Axtell was widely noted for his research on sorghum (Sorghum bicolor L.). The New York Times and other sources reported that Axtell had been one of discoverers of high-lysine sorghum, and that the discovery was crucial to the fight against world hunger.

== Career and life ==
Axtell was born in Minneapolis, Minnesota, on February 5, 1934. He received his B.S. degree in agronomy and plant genetics in 1957 from the University of Minnesota, M.S. degree in plant genetics in 1965, and Ph.D. degree in plant genetics in 1967, the last from University of Wisconsin–Madison. Axtell spent his entire academic career 34 years at Purdue University, starting in 1967 right after completing requirements for his Ph.D. degree. He became a full professor in 1975, and Lynn Distinguished Professor of Agronomy in 1982.
