= Exponent, Inc. =

American company

Coordinates: 37°28′53.7″N 122°10′25.6″W

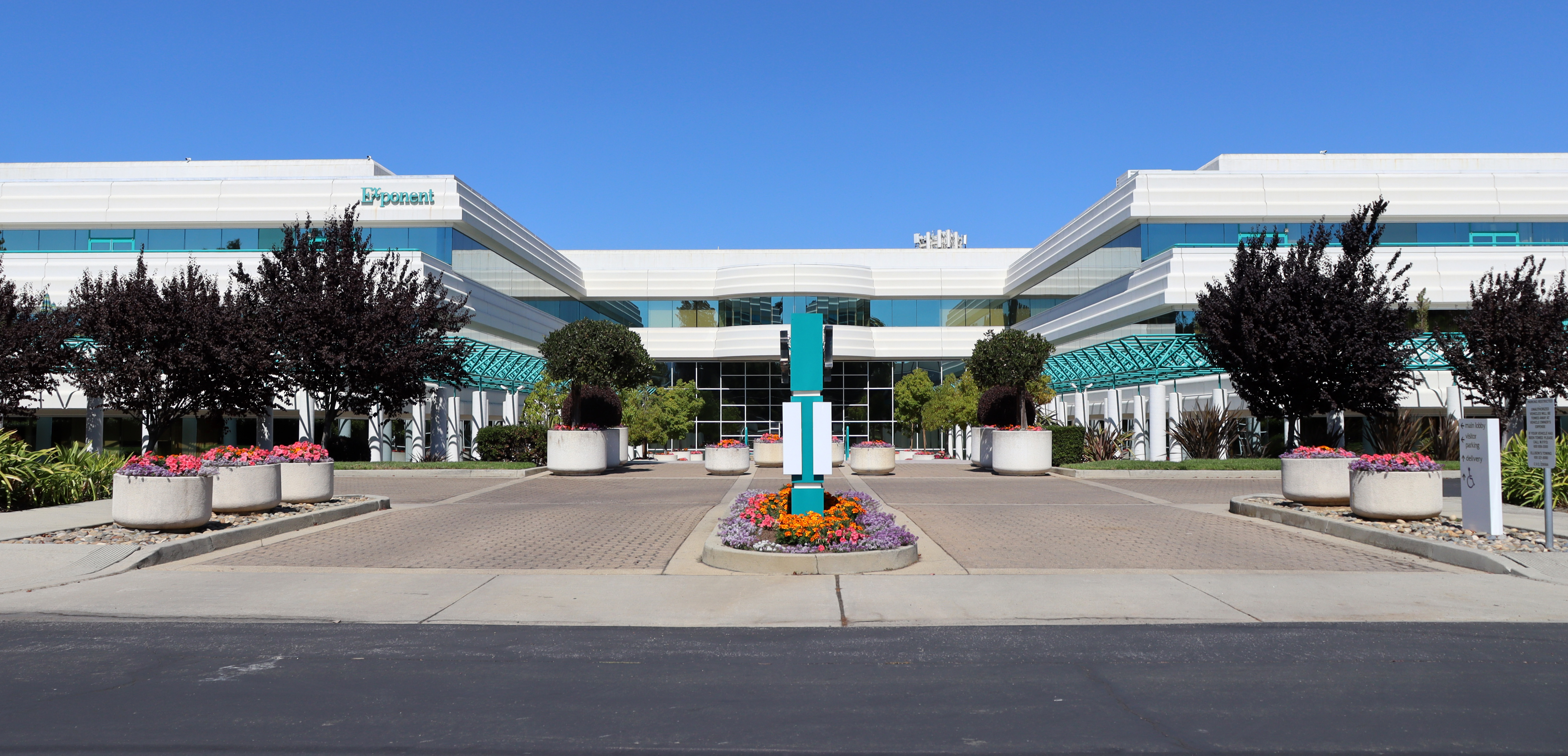
- Headquarters in Menlo Park
- Formerly: Failure Analysis Associates, Inc. (1967–1988); The Failure Group, Inc. (1989–1998)
- Traded as: Nasdaq: EXPO; S&P 400 component
- Industry: Research
- Founded: April 1967; 59 years ago, in Palo Alto, California, U.S.
- Founders: Alan Stephen Tetelman; Bernard Ross; Marsh Pound; John Shyne; Sathya V. Hanagud
- Headquarters: Menlo Park, California, U.S.
- Key people: Catherine F. Corrigan (CEO)
- Number of employees: 1,313 (December 30, 2022)
- Website: exponent.com

Exponent, Inc. is an American engineering and scientific consulting firm. Exponent has a team of scientists, physicians, engineers, and business consultants which performs research and analysis in more than 90 technical disciplines. The company operates 20 offices in the United States and five offices overseas.

== History ==
=== Founding and leadership ===
Failure Analysis Associates (FaAA) was founded in April 1967 by then Stanford University professor Alan Stephen Tetelman along with his colleagues Bernard Ross, Marsh Pound, John Shyne and Sathya V. Hanagud with $500 in capital.

At the time of FaAA's founding, Ross was also an engineering program manager at SRI International (then the Stanford Research Institute) (1965–1970). While en route to the site of a Navy jet crash investigation, Tetelman was killed on September 25, 1978, in the PSA Flight 182 air crash over San Diego between a PSA jet liner and a private Cessna airplane that claimed the lives of 144 people. He was forty-two years old.

Ross assumed the presidency of Failure Analysis Associates after the accident. Ross and the late Tetelman were featured in a documentary film about the company titled "What Went Wrong" made by the United States Information Service and distributed worldwide. Tetelman was a world-renowned expert in fracture mechanics and co-authored a textbook titled "The Principles of Engineering Materials" with Craig R. Barrett (former CEO of Intel) and Stanford professor, William D. Nix, published by Prentice-Hall in 1973.

In 1982, Roger McCarthy assumed the leadership of FaAA, becoming chief executive officer in 1982 until 1996, and chairman of the board in 1986 until 2005. McCarthy joined FaAA in 1978 and became a director and vice-president in 1980.

In 2004, McCarthy was elected to the National Academy of Engineering.

Michael R. Gaulke served as the chief executive officer of Exponent Inc. from June 1996 to May 28, 2009. He is currently chairman of the board of directors. Mr. Gaulke served as president of Exponent Inc. from March 1993 to May 22, 2007. Mr. Gaulke first joined Exponent Inc. in September 1992 and served as its executive vice president and chief financial officer.

In 2008, Oregon State University inducted Mr. Gaulke into its Engineering Hall of Fame.

Paul R. Johnston was the chief executive officer at Exponent Inc. from May 28, 2009 – May 31, 2018. Johnston was president of Exponent Inc. from May 2007 until July 2016. Johnston joined Exponent in 1981 and served as its Principal Engineer since 1987 and vice president since 1996. Johnston has co-authored a book titled "Structural Dynamics by Finite Elements" published by Prentice-Hall in 1987. On May 31, 2018, Johnston stepped down from the position of chief executive officer to be an executive chairman.

Catherine F. Corrigan was named president of Exponent, Inc. on July 29, 2016. Corrigan joined Exponent's Philadelphia office in 1996, was promoted to principal in 2002 and to corporate vice president in 2005. Corrigan was promoted to group vice president to lead the Transportation Group and joined the company's operating committee in 2012.

On May 31, 2018, Corrigan was appointed to chief executive officer.

=== Incorporation ===
Failure Analysis Associates was founded as a partnership, incorporated in 1968 in California and reincorporated in Delaware as Failure Analysis Associates, Inc. in 1988.

In 1989, McCarthy reincorporated Failure Analysis Associates, Inc. in Delaware under a holding company, The Failure Group, Inc. and took The Failure Group, Inc. public in 1990. The company changed its name to Exponent, Inc. in 1998.

== Company activities ==
Exponent has been involved in the investigations of many well known incidents including the now debunked report aired on Dateline in 1993 about fires and explosions involving sidesaddle fuel tanks on Chevrolet C/K trucks, the disputed Consumer Reports finding on Suzuki roll-over safety, the 2009–2010 Toyota vehicle recalls, the crash of American Airlines Flight 587 among many other aviation accidents, and the Exxon Valdez oil spill. The Federal Emergency Management Agency also hired Exponent to examine the Oklahoma City bombing damage aftermath, specifically the damage to the Alfred P. Murrah Federal Building. NASA hired Exponent in 1986 to determine the causes of the Space Shuttle Challenger disaster.

In 2003, Exponent was hired by the U.S. government to investigate the Space Shuttle Columbia disaster. In 2017, Samsung hired Exponent to determine cause of thermal runaway of the Note 7 Phone batteries.

Exponent has ISO 9001 accreditation, indicating independently audited and certified quality management practices. The company also is certified for battery, energy storage and compliance testing.

== Neutrality ==
Exponent has been criticized for the quality and neutrality of their reports pertaining to various controversial topics. Common points of critique include corporate denialism and the disproportionate production of favorable reports for industrial clients. Examples include a 2001 report suggesting that dioxins do not cause cancer.

According to the Los Angeles Times, "Exponent's research has come under fire from critics, including engineers, attorneys and academics who say the company tends to deliver to clients the reports they need to mount a public defense." Exponent's executive chairman responded that such criticism is a "cheap shot", responding "Do we tell our clients a lot of what they don't want to hear? Absolutely." In 2009, the Amazon Defense Coalition criticized an Exponent study commissioned by the energy company Chevron which suggested that exposure to oil waste increase cancer risks. Chevron's largest shareholder at the time was a director on Exponent's board. The firm was also criticized for assisting industry efforts to reduce chromium regulation.

== Notable projects ==
Partial listing of notable projects:

- Chevrolet C/K
- Suzuki v. Consumers Union
- American Airlines Flight 587
- Turkish Airlines Flight 981
- Exxon Valdez
- Oklahoma City bombing
- Space Shuttle Challenger disaster
- Space Shuttle Columbia disaster
- 2009–2011 Toyota vehicle recalls
- Drillship Seacrest
- Alexander L. Kielland (platform)
- Kansas City Hyatt Regency walkway collapse
- Kobe earthquake
- TWA Flight 800
- Assassination of John F. Kennedy
- James Dean motor vehicle accident
- Collapse of the World Trade Center
- Deflategate
- MARCbot
- Samsung Galaxy Note 7

== Research areas ==
Exponent's services are concentrated on multiple practices and centers, including:

- Biomechanics
- Biomedical Engineering
- Buildings & Structures
- Civil Engineering
- Construction Consulting
- Ecological & Biological Sciences
- Electrical Engineering & Computer Science
- Engineering Management Consulting
- Environmental & Earth Sciences
- Health Sciences
- Human factors
- Industrial Structures
- Materials Science & Corrosion Engineering
- Mechanical Engineering
- Polymers Science & Materials Chemistry
- Statistical & Data Sciences
- Technology Development
- Thermal Sciences
- Vehicle Engineering
- Visual Communication
