= Catherine F. Corrigan =

American engineer

Catherine Ford Corrigan is an American bioengineer and business executive.

Corrigan earned a bachelor's of science in engineering at the University of Pennsylvania in 1990. She subsequently earned a master's of science in mechanical engineering at the Massachusetts Institute of Technology in 1992, then completed a doctorate in mechanical engineering and medical physics via a joint program with Harvard Medical School. She is the chief executive officer of Exponent.

After completing her academics at Massachusetts Institute of Technology, Dr. Corrigan joined Exponent in 1996. She was promoted in 2002 to principal of the Biomechanics practice, then to corporate Vice President in 2005. After these achievements she was appointed to Vice President of Exponent’s Transportation group in 2012. In this position she oversaw vehicle engineering, biomechanics, human factors, statistical and data sciences practices, and visual communications at Exponent. Four years later, in 2016, Dr. Corrigan was appointed President, two years later becoming Exponent’s CEO in 2018.

In her professional career, Dr. Corrigan focused on the biomechanics of human injury. With the goal to better understand how the human body reacts to specific forces, she studied the relationship that biology and engineering share in biomechanics.

In 2021, Corrigan was elected a member of the United States National Academy of Engineering.
