= Michael A. Campion =

American academic

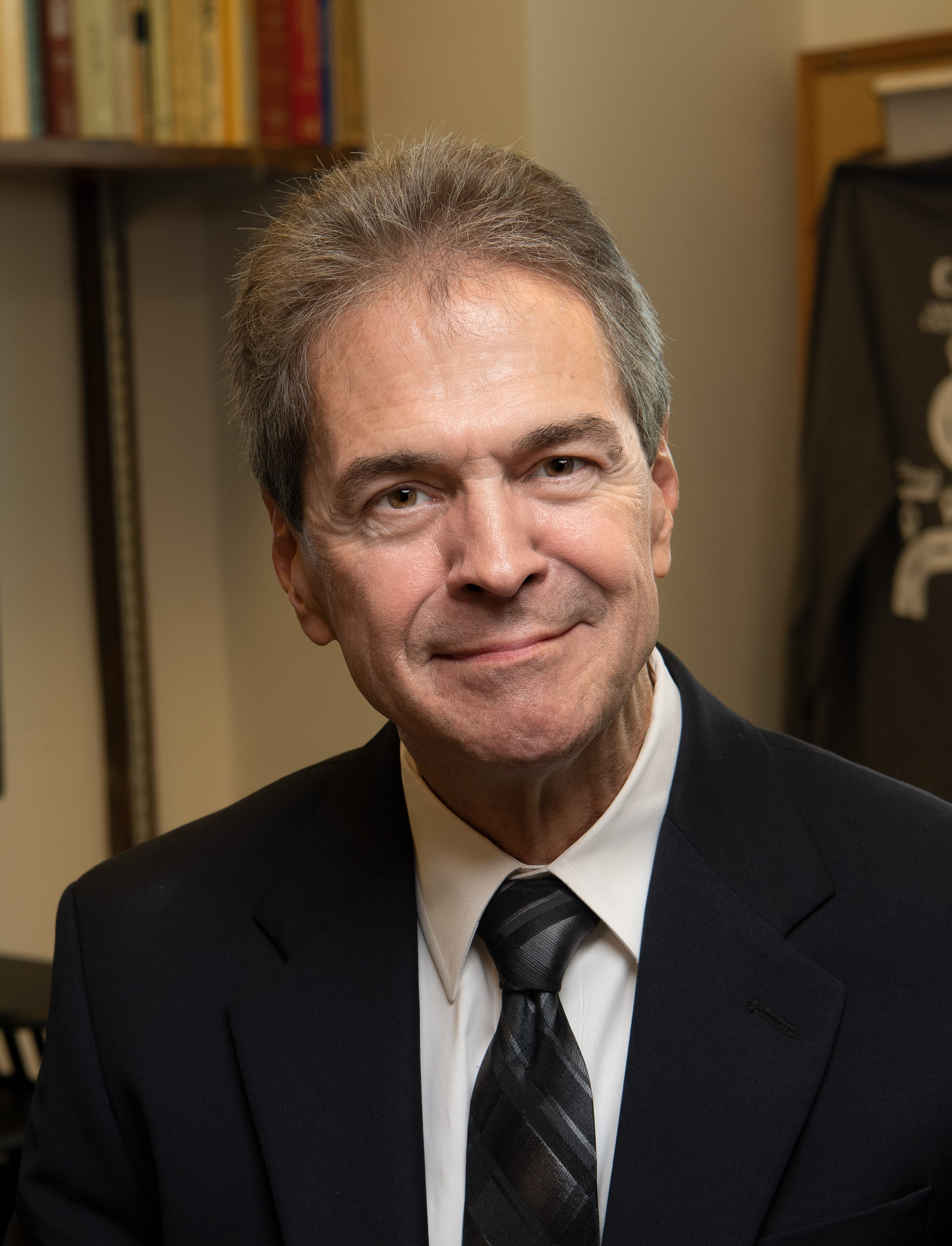
- Education: North Carolina State University
- Known for: Among the 10 most published authors in top-tier scientific journals and highly active management consultant
- Awards: 2009 Distinguished Scientific Contribution Award and 2020 Distinguished Professional Practice Award
- Scientific career
- Fields: Business
- Workplaces: Purdue University

Michael A. Campion is the Herman C. Krannert Distinguished Professor of Management at Purdue University (since 1986). Previous industrial experience (1978–1986) includes 4 years each at IBM and Weyerhaeuser Company. He has an MS and PhD in Industrial and Organizational (I/O) Psychology. He has over 170 articles in scientific and professional journals, and has given over 280 presentations at professional meetings, on such topics as employment testing, interviewing, mitigating employment discrimination, job analysis, work and team design, training, turnover, promotion, motivation, and computerized text analysis and artificial intelligence for employment decision making. He has over 42,000 Google Scholar citations, over 12,500 Web of Science citations, and he is the second most cited author of over 9,000 authors in textbooks in both I/O Psychology and Human Resource Management. He has conducted over 1,800 projects for over 200 private and public sector organizations during the past 40 years on nearly all Human Resources topics. Dr. Campion is past editor of Personnel Psychology (a scientific research journal) and past president of the Society for Industrial-Organizational Psychology (SIOP). He was promoted to the Herman C. Krannert Chaired Professorship in 2009 and to Distinguished Professor in 2020 for contributions and productivity in scientific research. He is also the 2009 winner of the Distinguished Scientific Contribution Award given by SIOP, the lifetime scientific award and most prestigious award given by SIOP; and the Distinguished Professional Award, the lifetime professional award. He is a fellow of SIOP, the American Psychological Association, the American Psychology Society, and a member of the Academy of Management.
