= Monroe's motivated sequence =

Public speaking strategy

Monroe's motivated sequence is a persuasive speech framework developed by American professor Alan H. Monroe in the 1930s.

It is widely used in public speaking, marketing, advertising, and communication to encourage people to take action.

The technique organises information in a clear and psychologically engaging way, leading the audience through a step-by-step process that builds motivation and ends with a call to act.

== Foundation ==
Alan H. Monroe was born in 1903. He earned a Bachelor of Science from Northwestern University and began teaching public speaking at Purdue University. He completed his master's degree in 1927 and his doctorate in 1937.

Monroe created the sequence at Purdue University, drawing on the work of philosopher John Dewey on how humans solve problems. Monroe also considered Maslow's hierarchy of needs and combined these ideas to form a structure for persuasive communication.

The result is a framework to appeal to people's natural motivations and lead them toward a specific outcome.

== Steps ==
Monroe's model is made up of five steps, each building on the last to guide the audience toward action:

Attention
Capture the audience's interest. This is done using a compelling opening to draw people in and make them want to listen.
Need
Show that there is a problem or need that affects the audience. The goal is to make the issue feel relevant and important, often linking it to the audience's personal experiences or psychological needs and highlighting why it is a problem while indicating its severity.
Satisfaction
Offer a solution. Present a practical and believable way to solve the problem introduced in the previous step.
Visualization
Help the audience imagine what the world would look like if the solution were adopted, or if it were ignored. This step makes the benefits or consequences feel more real and immediate.
Action
Clearly tell the audience what they can do next. This is a direct call to action, giving people something specific to say, do, or change.

== Benefits ==
The strength of Monroe's Motivated Sequence is that it focuses on what the audience can do.

Many persuasive messages fail because people feel powerless. Monroe's approach helps listeners feel heard and empowered. It is structured in a way that mirrors how people naturally think through problems and decisions.

Because of this, it is used widely in fields like sales, marketing, education, and politics.

== Research ==
Researcher, Tracy Micciche, conducted a study on 21, 23, and 24-year-old college students, with the 22-year-olds being the control group. Participants were told that they would receive better parking for an extra $50. The study used three different versions explaining the $50 for parking. One version used Monroe's motivated sequence. They explained the parking fee in the order of attention, need, satisfaction, visualization, and call to action. Other variations used Monroe's motivated sequence in different orders. Micciche found that the explanation using Monroe's motivated sequence's original order was significantly higher for the college students to understand.

In India, Prime Minister Narendra Modi explored the idea of implementing the 'Janta Curfew' or the 'People Curfew' as a first step to stopping the spread of the virus COVID-19 on March 22, 2020. Narendra Modi used Monroe's motivated sequence to persuade his citizens to implement a trial run lockdown from 7 am-9 pm, 14 hours, which was named the 'Janta Curfew' before the ultimate decision of the Prime Minister to go on to a 41-day extensive lockdown. Prime Minister Narendra Modi had some words to say about the success of the trial run curfew, "the experience gained from it, would prepare people for their upcoming challenges." The success of this curfew was ultimately implemented and practiced by the people for the people.

A study conducted by Bernadette Peter Lidadun and Nancy Chiuh examined the use of Monroe's motivated sequence. In the study, Lidadun and Chiuh used reading assignments and gave them to a group of aspirants for the Catholic priesthood in a Formation House in Malaysia. The research was conducted with ten participants from February 2019 to June 2019. The research indicates that participants engage more in the five-step approach of Monroe's motivated sequence during extensive reading online. The study also found that refining each step of Monroe's motivated sequence is essential for people using English as a second language. Researchers watched these groups use Monroe's motivated sequence to see if there could be a scaffold for participants who would be more prepared to find their research before verbally presenting it. While Monroe's motivated sequence enthused participants' reading experience, there would need to be refinement on each research step before verbal presentation. In conclusion, while Monroe's motivated sequence enthused participants' reading experience, each step of the sequence must be refined to make it accessible for ESL readers.

Research conducted by Alen Mateo S. Munzo, on July 6–8, 2022, at the University of De La Salle, Manila, Philippines, used Monroe's motivated sequence to determine communicative function by inviting viewers to apply themselves to an advocacy project. This study used Monroe's motivated sequence to visually see the learning outcomes of advocacy awareness from the course syllabus. The e-service program through the University of De La Salle, Manila, Philippines, aimed to provide an environment online that fosters personal goals. This study included 26 students enrolled in the purposive communication course. Students individually wrote essays before being grouped into five.

Seriaznita Mat Said, Ali Salman Hummadi, and Amerrudin Abd Manan conducted research on President Donald Trump's Policy Speech in Jerusalem. Said, Hummadi, and Manan used Monroe's motivated sequence steps to analyze Trump's speech. This study used the five steps of the sequence and found that President Trump was successful in his use of persuasion on four of the five steps of Monroe's motivated sequence. Results indicate that President Trump did not entirely complete the satisfaction step.

=== In advertising ===
A study published in The Journal of Interpersonal Violence showcased Monroe's motivated sequence theory by designing videos for Asian immigrant women regarding intimate partner violence (IPV). The video was made in four languages; Korean, Mandarin Chinese, Thai, and Vietnamese. Participants included Asian women ages 25–45. During the study, participants were shown a video on IPV and how to get help through primary care settings. Results showed nearly three-fourths of participants indicated that they felt the videos would be useful in encouraging IPV victims to disclose. The use of Monroe's motivated sequence to persuade viewers was found effective in this study; however, participants thought the need and visualization appeal could have been stronger. A similar study assessing IPV ads found advertisements should work on increasing self-confidence in performing the recommended behaviors, as well as encouraging perpetrators to make a firm commitment to ending domestic violence. In conclusion, results suggest that culturally relevant interventions based on persuasive theories like Monroe's motivated sequence—such as multi-lingual videos placed in primary health clinic consultation rooms—may help to overcome some of the barriers to immigrants' disclosure and start them on the path to a better future.

A study published in Strategic Communications in Africa: the sub-Saharan context covers an analysis of street ads in Yoruba language collected from Ibadan, Nigeria using Monroe's motivated sequence. Its analysis focused on textual content, in terms of the words used in the selected street adverts. These aspects of content were thoroughly examined to establish how they pass messages that influence patronage of products and services. Results showed the connection Monroe's motivated sequence with the selected street adverts. All the elements of Monroe's motivated sequence were reflected in the selected adverts. Another study assessing Indonesian and Nigerian advertisements notes the importance of visual elements in advertisements complementing each other. In conclusion, Monroe's steps, specifically visualization can be applied to Nigerian street ads.

=== Limitations ===
While Monroe's sequence provides a systematic approach for structuring persuasive messages, research by Eagly demonstrated that audience comprehension does not guarantee persuasion. Another study that was conducted by Beighley found that factors such as delivery modality (oral or written), audience skills, message organization, and material complexity all influence the effectiveness of persuasive communication. All these factors contribute to the audience being persuaded and understanding, showing that the five steps of Monroe's motivated sequence can have limited effectiveness.

Monroe's motivated sequence can also be ineffective if it is used with an audience who has already made up their mind, whether they are already convinced to purchase or not purchase a product, or disagree or agree with the opinion being presented in an argument. For example, if a speaker is using it in a persuasive gun control speech to an audience who strongly believes that there should be no gun laws, Monroe's motivated sequence would not be effective. Research indicates that prior beliefs or decisions exert a more substantial influence on persuasion outcomes than the argument's structure or organization, even when utilizing frameworks like Monroe's Motivated Sequence.

Monroe's motivated sequence may be adapted for use on social media platforms, but the effectiveness depends on many factors. Currently, with technology, the population gets persuaded to purchase things or to get their attention on a topic through social media. Research shows that persuasion on social media can influence people in making decisions. It was created in the mid-1930s for long speeches, but it was never designed for social media at the time. The model's five stages often require more time and engagement than typical digital content allows, limiting its practical application for online audiences.

The effectiveness of Monroe's motivated sequence is contingent upon the perceived credibility of the speaker. Credibility in a speech can come from the topic, the speaker's ability to relate to the audience, and their reputation. Research indicates that when a speech has a strong, credible source, an audience is more likely to be persuaded. A speaker who was not a credible source delivered a speech using Monroe's motivated sequence; it would have the limitation of being effective, because the audience would not be persuaded and feel as if what the speaker is sharing is not credible.
