= Gerald Shively =

American economist

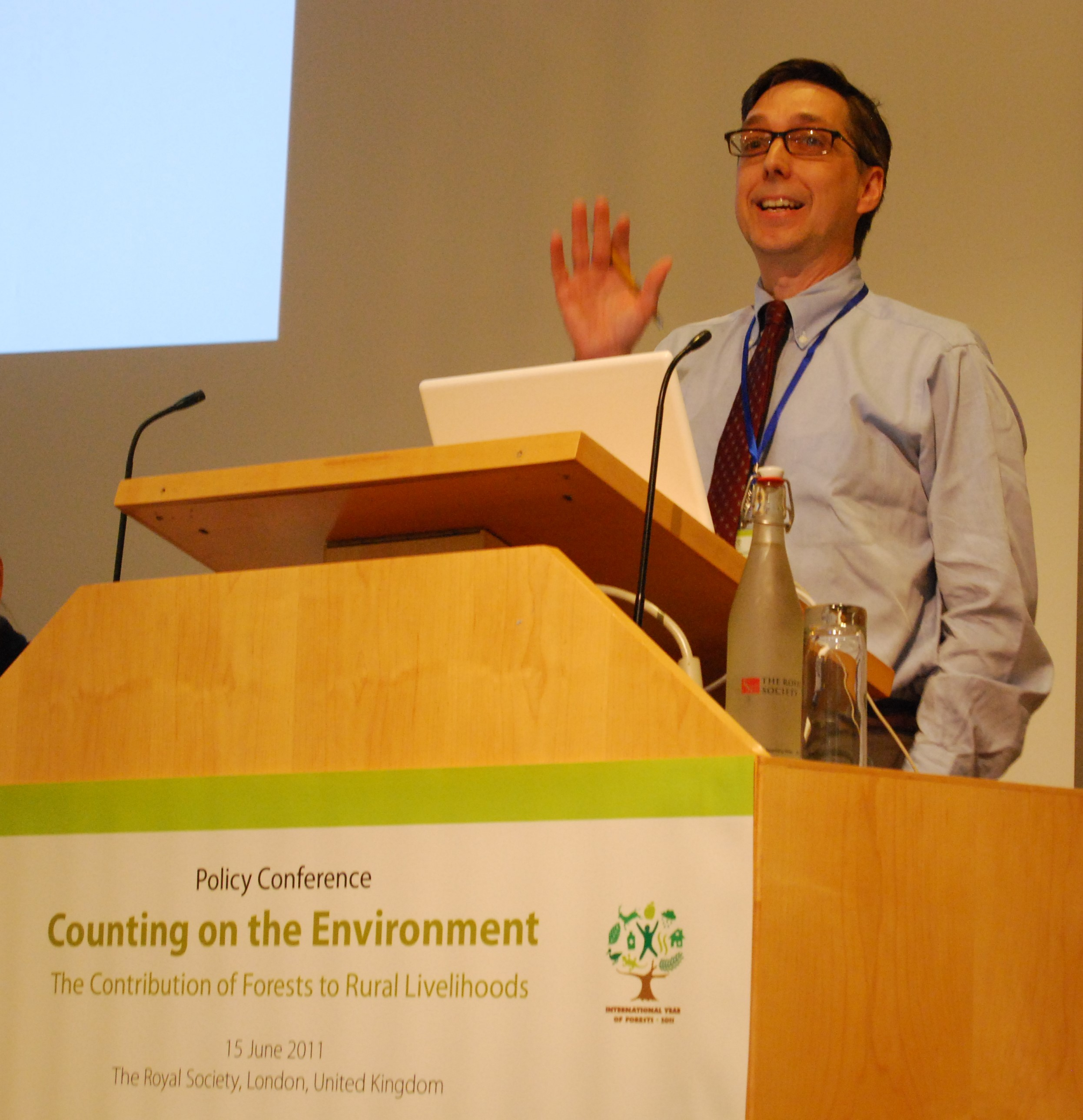
Gerald Shively presenting at the June 15, 2011 policy conference “Counting on the Environment,” held at The Royal Society, in the UK.

Gerald Shively (born 1962) is an American economist and professor in the Department of Agricultural Economics at Purdue University. He teaches and publishes research articles and books related to contemporary policy-related issues in economic development. His specializations are in poverty, food security and sustainable development.

== Education and career ==
Shively received his B.A. in Economics in 1984 and his M.A. in economics in 1985, both from Boston University. He received his Ph.D. in Agricultural and Applied Economics from the University of Wisconsin-Madison in 1996. Prior to this, he conducted research at the Cornell Food and Nutrition Policy Program at Cornell University. Shively began his Professional career as an assistant professor in the Department of Agricultural Economics at Purdue University in 1996, where he served as Associate Department Head and Director of the Graduate Program in Agricultural Economics from 2008 to 2018. From 2007 to 2015 he also served as an adjunct professor in the School of Economics and Business at the Norwegian University of Life Sciences (NMBU) in Ås, Norway. During the 2003–2004 academic year, he was a visiting researcher and Honorary Fellow in the Department of Economics and the Asian Economics Centre at the University of Melbourne in Victoria, Australia. From 2006 to 2015 he served as Editor-in-Chief of Agricultural Economics, the flagship journal of the International Association of Agricultural Economists (IAAE).

In 2008, Shively became a Purdue University Faculty Scholar and is currently a faculty affiliate in the Purdue Policy Research Institute (PPRI). From 2018 to 2025, he served as the Chair of the Publications Review Committee for the International Food Policy Research Institute (IFPRI) in Washington, DC. From 2019 to 2023, he was appointed Faculty Fellow for Global Affairs in Purdue University's Office of the Executive Vice President for Research and Partnerships. In March 2019, he became Associate Dean and Director of International Programs in Agriculture at Purdue.

Over his career, Shively has authored or co-authored more than 200 scholarly contributions, including more than 100 peer-reviewed items. These include scholarly articles in academic journals including the Proceedings of the National Academy of Sciences of the United States of America, the Journal of Development Economics, the American Journal of Agricultural Economics, and World Development. Among Shively's contributions to the popular press is his chapter in the 2017 book How to Feed the World. His early research on smallholder-led deforestation was profiled in the story A Shifting Equation Links Modern Farming and Forests, which appeared in the November 12, 1999 issue of Science. In 2010, he was interviewed as part of an Australian Radio National and BBC World Service radio program “Buzzing with Beans” about the growth and impacts of coffee production in Vietnam.

In addition to serving for a decade as Editor of Agricultural Economics, between 2013 and 2020 he served on the Editorial Boards for the journals Land Economics and Environment and Development Economics. His global leadership includes service to numerous universities and public and non-governmental organizations, including the African Economic Research Consortium, the U.S. Council on Food, Agricultural and Resource Economics (C-FARE), the International Food Policy Research Institute, the United Nations World Food Programme, and the World Bank.

== Awards ==
In 2025, Shively was named a Fellow of the Agricultural and Applied Economics Association, the association's highest honor. In 2018, Shively was named an Honorary Life Member (Fellow) of the International Association of Agricultural Economists. He is also a Fellow of the African Association of Agricultural Economics. He received the 2018 Distinguished Graduate Teaching Award from the Agricultural and Applied Economics Association and on December 11, 2018, his name was entered into Purdue University's Book of Great Teachers.

== Articles and books ==
A Beginner's Guide to Dynamic Optimization in Economics. Springer. ISBN 9783032093738

Agricultural Change, Rural Labor Markets, and Forest Clearing: an Illustrative Case from the Philippines. Land Economics 77(2001):268-284. doi: 10.2307/3147094

Cropland Allocation Effects of Agricultural Input Subsidies in Malawi. (2012). World Development 40(1):124-133. With C. Chibwana and M. Fisher. doi: 10.1016/j.worlddev.2011.04.022

Food Price Variability and Economic Reform: An ARCH Approach for Ghana. American Journal of Agricultural Economics 78(1996):126-136. doi: 10.2307/1243784

Infrastructure mitigates the sensitivity of child growth to local agriculture and rainfall in Nepal and Uganda. Proceedings of the National Academy of Sciences of the United States 114(2017):903-908. doi: 10.1073/pnas.1524482114

Land Use Change in Tropical Watersheds: Evidence, Causes, and Remedies. Wallingford (UK): CAB International. Co-Edited with I. Coxhead. ISBN 9780851999128

Spatial Integration, Arbitrage Costs, and the Response of Local Prices to Policy Changes in Ghana. (1998). Journal of Development Economics 56(2):411-431. With O. Badiane. doi: 10.1016/S0304-3878(98)00072-8
