= Ann Majchrzak =

American management academic

- Citizenship: American
- Education: University of Paris (Diploma); Pitzer College (BA); University of California, Los Angeles (MA); University of California, Los Angeles (PhD)
- Scientific career
- Fields: Information systems Digital Innovation; Organization Studies

Ann Majchrzak is an American academic. She is a Professor of Digital Innovation in the Department of Data Sciences and Operations within the USC Marshall School of Business. Majchrzak holds the USC Associates Chair in Business Administration.

== Awards ==
- Association for Information Systems Fellow Award 2013 in recognition of her outstanding contributions to the information systems discipline in the areas of research, teaching and service
- Lifetime Service Award, Organizational Communication and Information Systems Division, Academy of Management lifetime service award, 2015
- Shaoul Foundation Research Fellow, The Mortimer and Rayner Sackler Institute of Advanced Studies, Tel Aviv University, 2016
- Medal of Excellence, Portland International Center for Management of Engineering and Technology 2019
- Best Paper Award 2000, Management Information Systems Quarterly, Majchrzak, A., Rice, R.E., Malhotra, A, King, N., Ba, S. (2000) Technology adaptation: the case of a computer-supported inter-organizational virtual team. MIS Quarterly, 24 (4), 569–600.

== Career and research ==
Majchrzak has held visiting appointments and/or fellowships at ESADE Business School, University Ramon Llull (Barcelona, Spain), Vrije Universiteit Amsterdam, LUISS Business School (Rome, Italy), and Simon Fraser University (Vancouver Canada) in the areas of Innovation and Organization.

Throughout her career she has served in editorial roles for the field's top journals. As examples, she served as a senior editor for Organization Science from 2004 to 2020 and Management Information Systems Quarterly from 2011 to 2014.

In 2020, she published the book, Unleashing the Crowd: Collaborative Solutions to Wicked Business Solutions and Societal Problems, with co-author, Arvind Malhotra.

== Selected publications ==
- Majchrzak, A., Rice, R. E., Malhotra, A., King, N., & Ba, S. (2000). Technology adaptation: The case of a computer-supported inter-organizational virtual team. MIS quarterly, 569-600.
- Majchrzak, A., Faraj, S., Kane, G. C., & Azad, B. (2013). The contradictory influence of social media affordances on online communal knowledge sharing. Journal of Computer-Mediated Communication, 19(1), 38-55. https://doi.org/10.1111/jcc4.12030
- Majchrzak, A., Cooper, L. P., & Neece, O. E. (2004). Knowledge reuse for innovation. Management science, 50(2), 174-188. https://doi.org/10.1287/mnsc.1030.0116
