= Wei Zheng (pharmacist) =

American pharmaceutical scientist and toxicologist

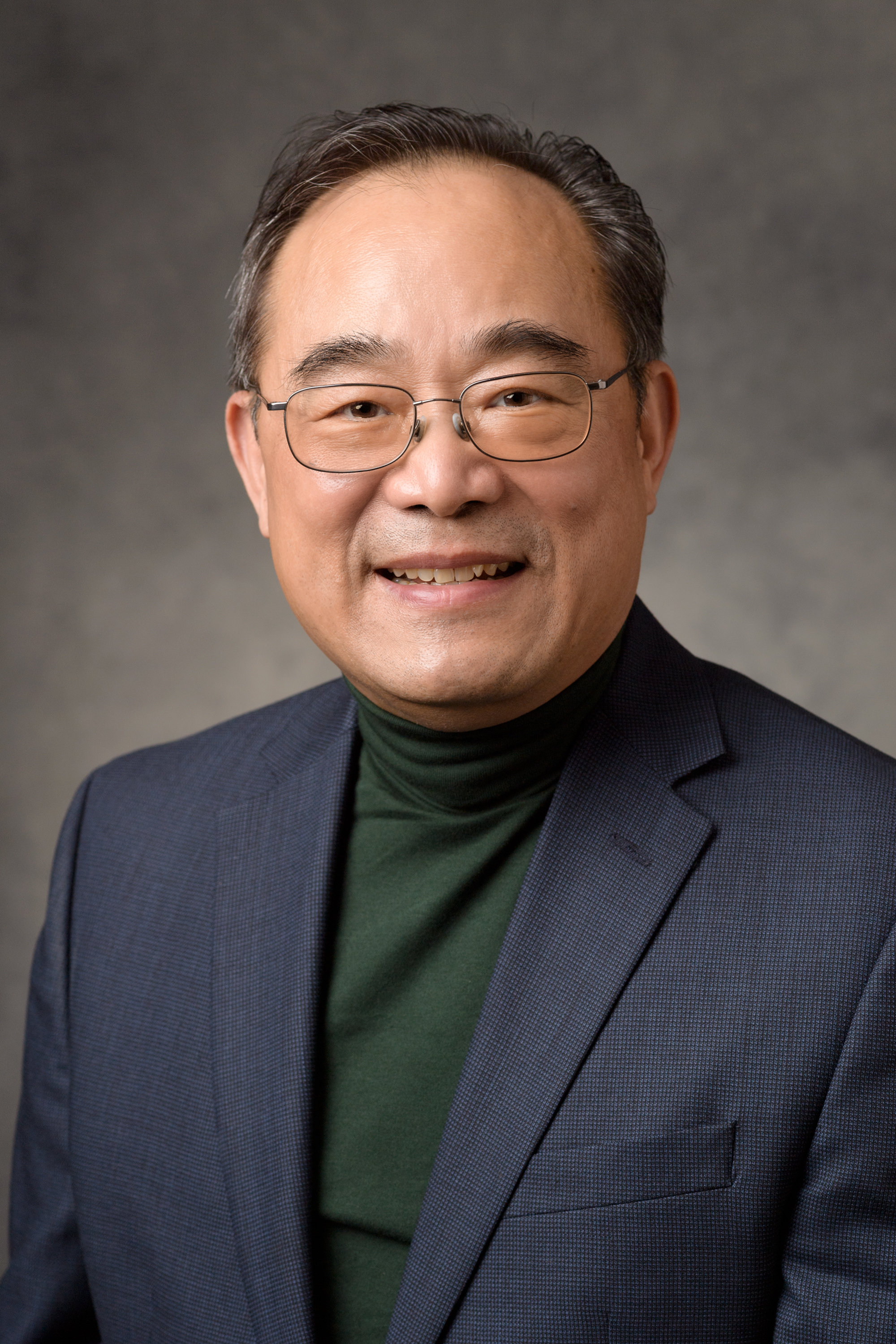
Wei Zheng in 2020

Wei Zheng (simplified Chinese: 郑伟; traditional Chinese: 鄭偉) is an American pharmaceutical scientist and toxicologist. He is Professor Emeritus at the School of Health Sciences at Purdue University.

== Early life ==
Zheng received his BS in pharmacy and MS in pharmacology from the Zhejiang University College of Pharmacy in Hangzhou, China. Zheng later studied in the United States, earning a Ph.D. in pharmacology and toxicology from the University of Arizona in Tucson, Arizona.

Zheng worked as an assistant professor (1993–2000) and later as an associate professor (2000–2003) at the School of Public Health and College of Physicians and Surgeons at Columbia University. Zheng joined the faculty of Purdue University in 2003.

Zheng served as a professor of Health Sciences and Toxicology, the Associate Dean of the College of Pharmacy, Nursing and Health Sciences, and the Head of the School of Health Sciences at Purdue.

Zheng was a member of the NIH Environmental Health Sciences Review Committee (2003–2007) and a member of the NIH/NAL Study Section (2008–2012).

Zheng was elected to the Society of Toxicology, the Society for Neuroscience, and the New York Academy of Sciences. Within the toxicology community, he served as the President of the Metals Specialty Section of SOT (2009–2010) and Chair of SOT Board of Publication (2016–2019). Zheng is also a Board Member of Chinese Society of Toxicology. Zheng is listed in Marquis Who's Who in America published in 2009. Zheng was the president of the International Society for Trace Element Research in Humans from 2015 to 2019. Zheng is a Fellow of the Academy of Toxicological Sciences.

== Selected works ==
- Zheng, Wei; Chodobski, Adam (30 March 2005). The Blood-Cerebrospinal Fluid Barrier. CRC Press. ISBN 978-1-4200-2340-4.
