= Purdue University School of Mechanical Engineering =

Academic unit in West Lafayette, Indiana, US

Coordinates: 40°25.86′N 86°54.87′W

School of Mechanical Engineering
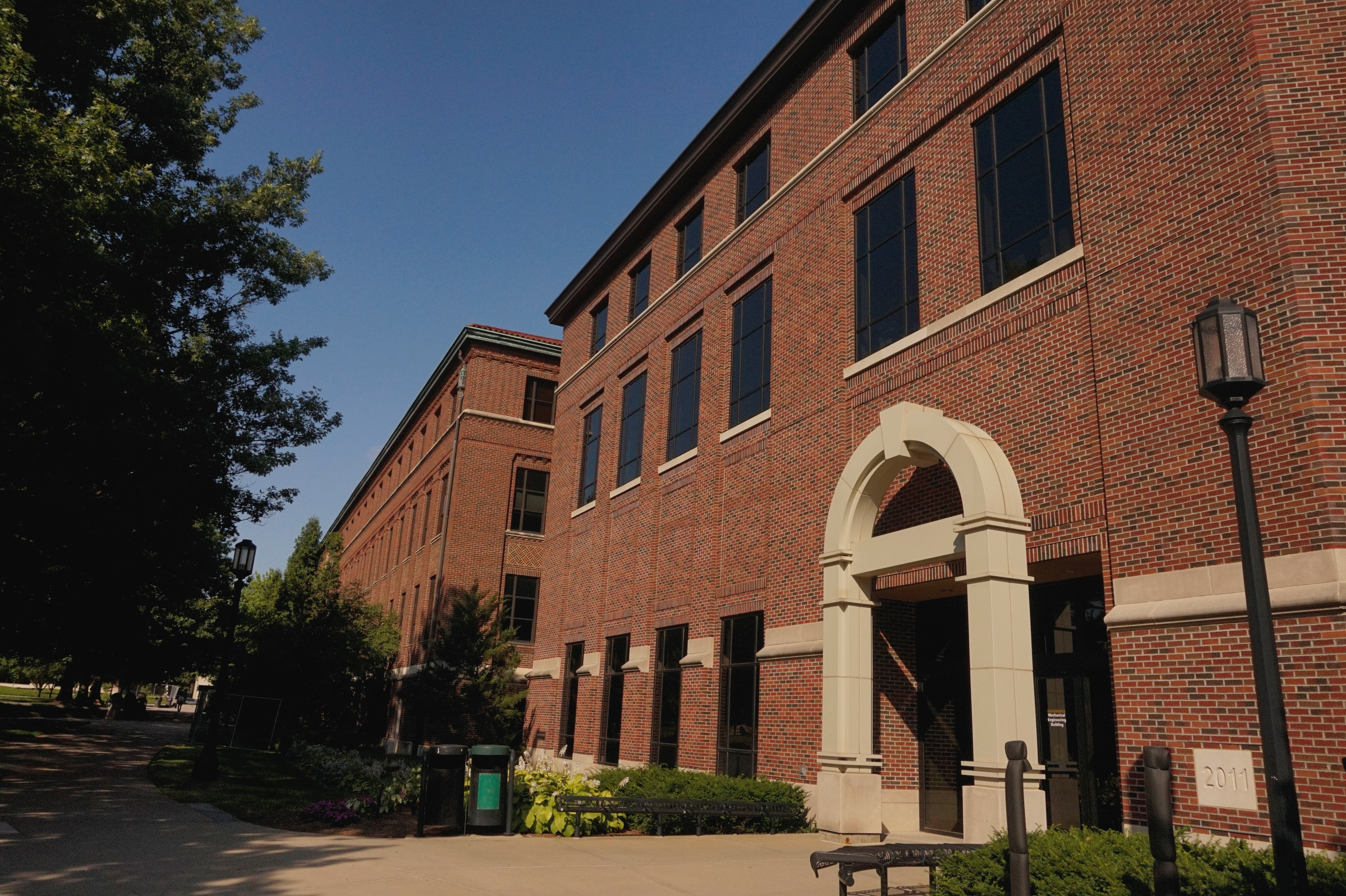
- Mechanical Engineering Building
- Type: Public
- Established: 1882
- Affiliations: Purdue University
- William E. and Florence E. Perry Head: Eckhard A. Groll, Reilly Professor of Mechanical Engineering
- Location: 465 Northwestern Ave. West Lafayette, IN 47907-2035, West Lafayette, Indiana, US
- Website: engineering.purdue.edu/ME

The School of Mechanical Engineering is a department-level school within the College of Engineering at Purdue University.

The School of ME offers both an undergraduate B.S. degree as well as M.S. and PhD graduate degrees in Mechanical Engineering. The school enrolls over 2,000 undergraduates (sophomores through seniors) and over 1,000 graduate students. U.S. News & World Report ranks Purdue's Mechanical Engineering 7th at the Undergraduate level [America's Best Colleges 2026] and 7th at the Graduate level [America's Best Graduate Schools 2026]. The online M.S. program in Mechanical Engineering is ranked No. 1 in the nation [America's Best Online Graduate Programs].

== History ==
As a Land-grant university, engineering was a part of Purdue since its founding. The School of Mechanical Engineering was established in 1882 as the first of Purdue's schools of engineering with head being Lt. William Hamilton of the United States Army.

=== Mechanical Engineering Buildings ===
During its first few years, the Mechanical Engineering school grew drastically, so the first of many mechanical engineering buildings was erected in 1885, originally known as the Mechanical Lab. The Mechanical lab was stocked with around $3000 of modern machinery and tools, but it quickly began to fail the needs of the students. In 1890 President James H. Smart requested $60,000 from the state to build a new mechanical engineering building. He only receive $12,000 which was not nearly enough to build what he had planned. On October 21, 1892, a celebration erupted in University Hall when Smart announced that the university received a generous donation. $35,000 from Amos Heavilon was secured to erect the long desired Mechanical Engineering Building. After seeing the support the school was getting, the state eventually pitched in $50,000.

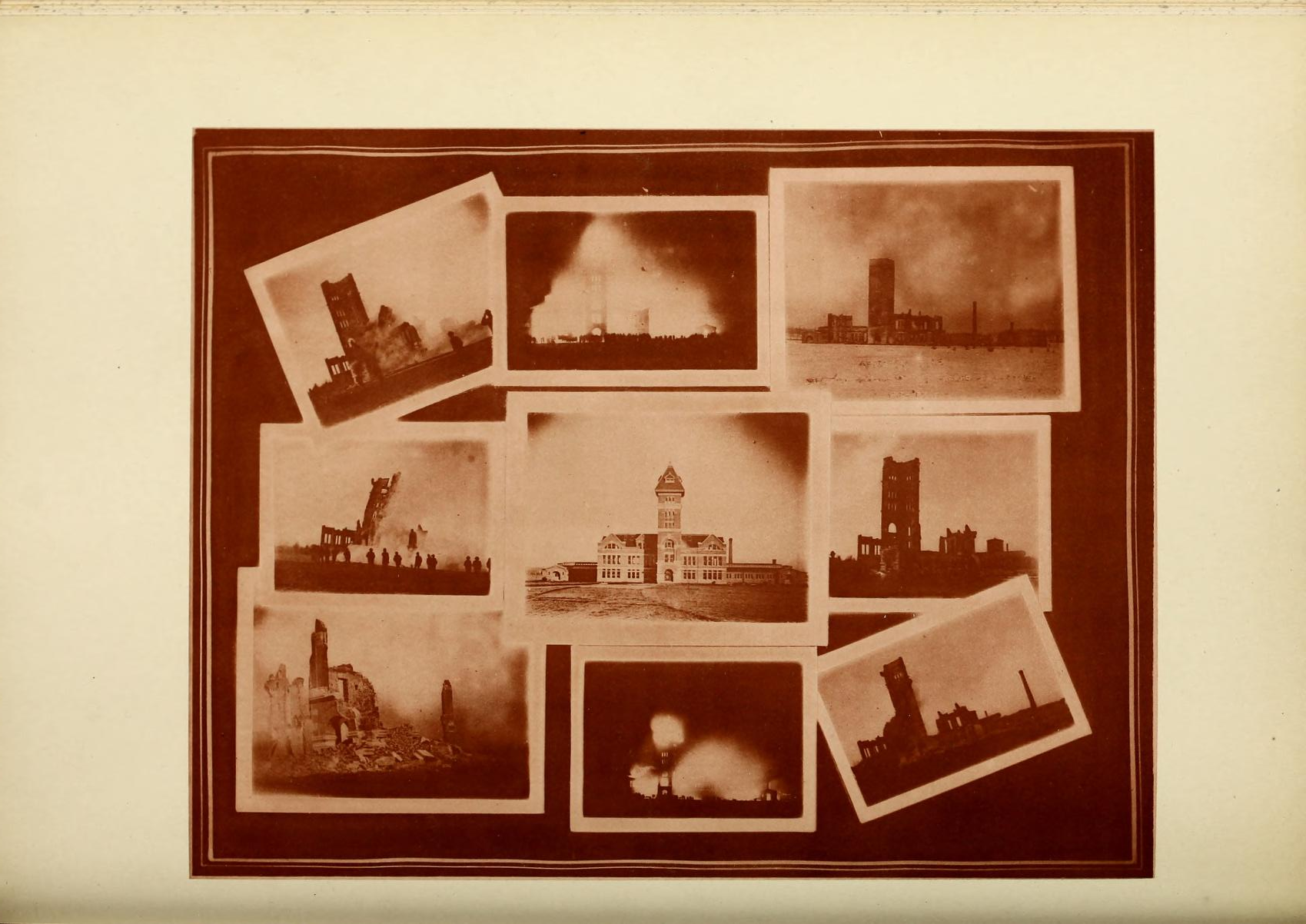
Heavilon Hall and its destruction (1894)

The Mechanical Engineering Building, often referred to as the first of three Heavilon Halls, was dedicated and accepted by governor Claude Matthews on January 19, 1894. This was greatly celebrated, as the Purdue Exponent proclaimed: "The new Engineering Laboratories, which we have needed for so long, are at last completed." Four days later, a gas explosion started a fire in boiler room, and a thousand people watched as new building was destroyed. President Smart later wrote:

Heavilon Hall had been beautiful four days before: it was infinitely more beautiful now, but the crowds this time were speechless with grief and in a few hours only a pitiful mass of blackened ruins remained to mark the spot where Purdue’s greatest pride once stood.

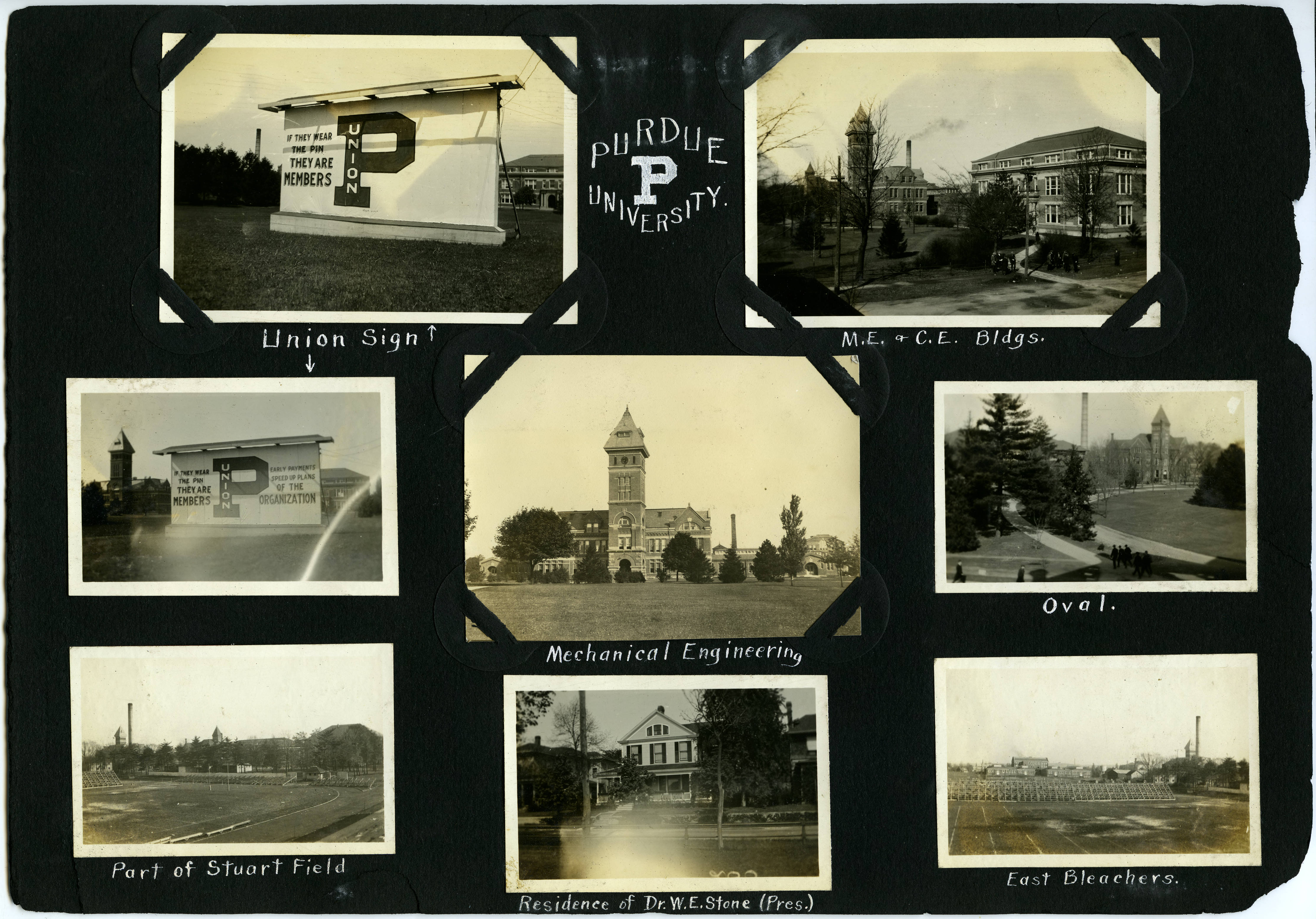
Mechanical Engineering Building (1914)

The morning after the fire, President Smart addressed the Purdue Community. He stated: “I have shed all of my tears for our loss last night. We are looking this morning to the future, not the past... I tell you young men, that tower shall go up one brick higher.” The university asked for help to fund the new building and its equipment and 52 companies responded. The new Heavilon Hall, officially the Mechanical Engineering Building at the time, was reopened in 1895. A clock with bells was placed in the tower. After 35 years of use the building was officially renamed Heavilon Hall, and mechanical engineering moved out. The clock tower was torn down in 1956.

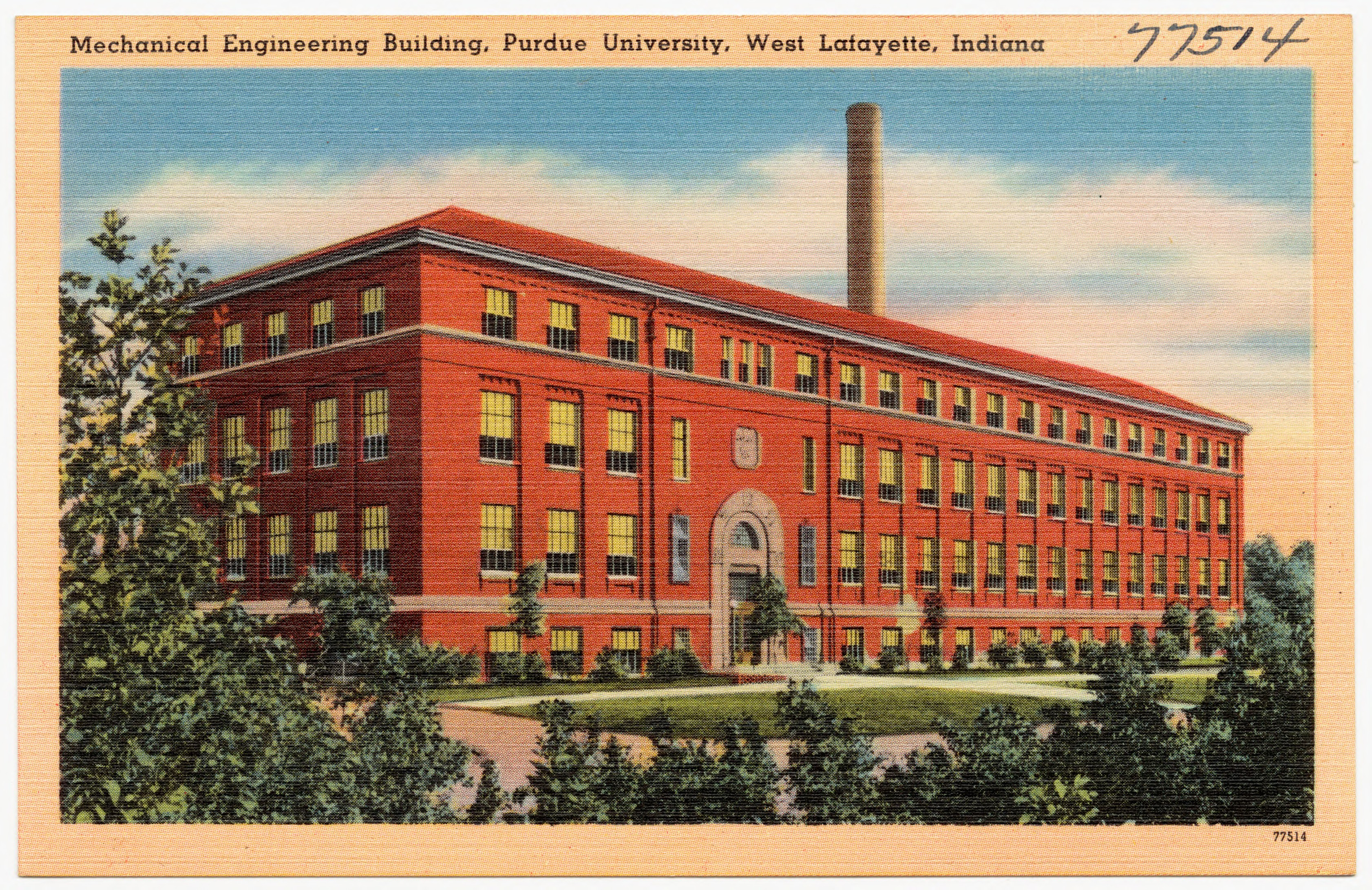
Mechanical Engineering Building circa 1935

In 1930 a new mechanical engineering building was erected, with a new additions added shortly after in 1933, 1941,1948, and 1950.

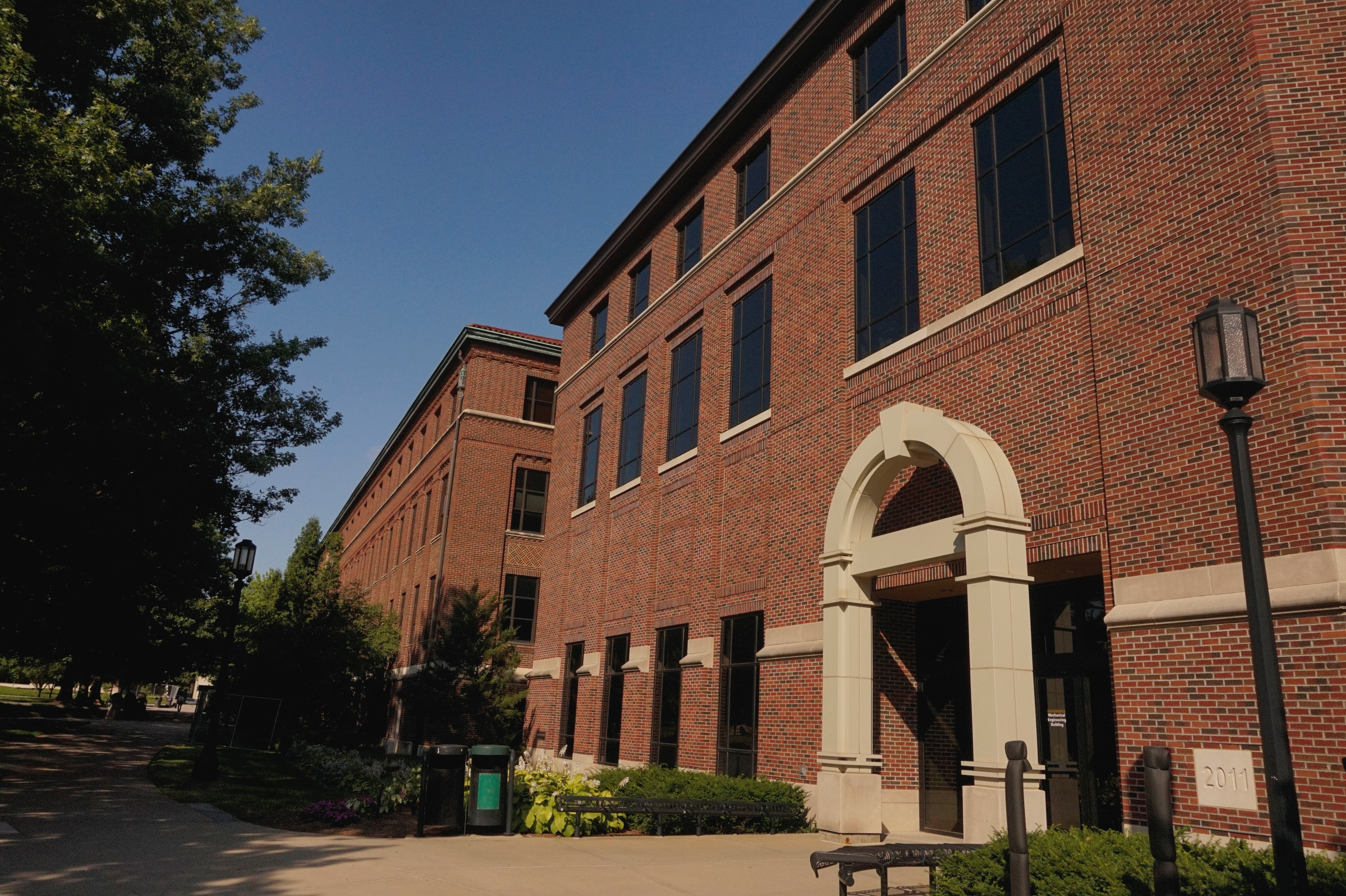
Mechanical Engineering Building in 2024

In 2009 the Roger B. Gatewood wing was added to the Mechanical Engineering Building. It added over 41,000 square feet increasing the size of the building by 55%. It is Purdue's first LEED building. This wing is equipped with flexible classroom space, student commons, computer labs, student learning labs, faculty offices, conference rooms, and research labs, all centered around the Dr. Milton B. and Betty Ruth Hollander Atrium. The atrium regularly hosts industry days, and shows off student projects, such as toys designed by students for ME 444-Computer Aided Design & Prototyping. The clock from Heavilon Hall was placed over the atrium on the second floor.

Since August 2023 the mechanical engineering building has been undergoing a $25 million renovation financed by gift funds. All the infrastructure outside of the Gatewood wing is to be upgraded. Some important updates are: the inclusion of male and female restrooms on the same floor, modern elevators, and new machine shops, instructional labs, maker spaces, and collaborative spaces for students and faculty. The renovated area was originally set to officially reopen August 29, 2025, but after a flood it was rescheduled for October 24, 2025.

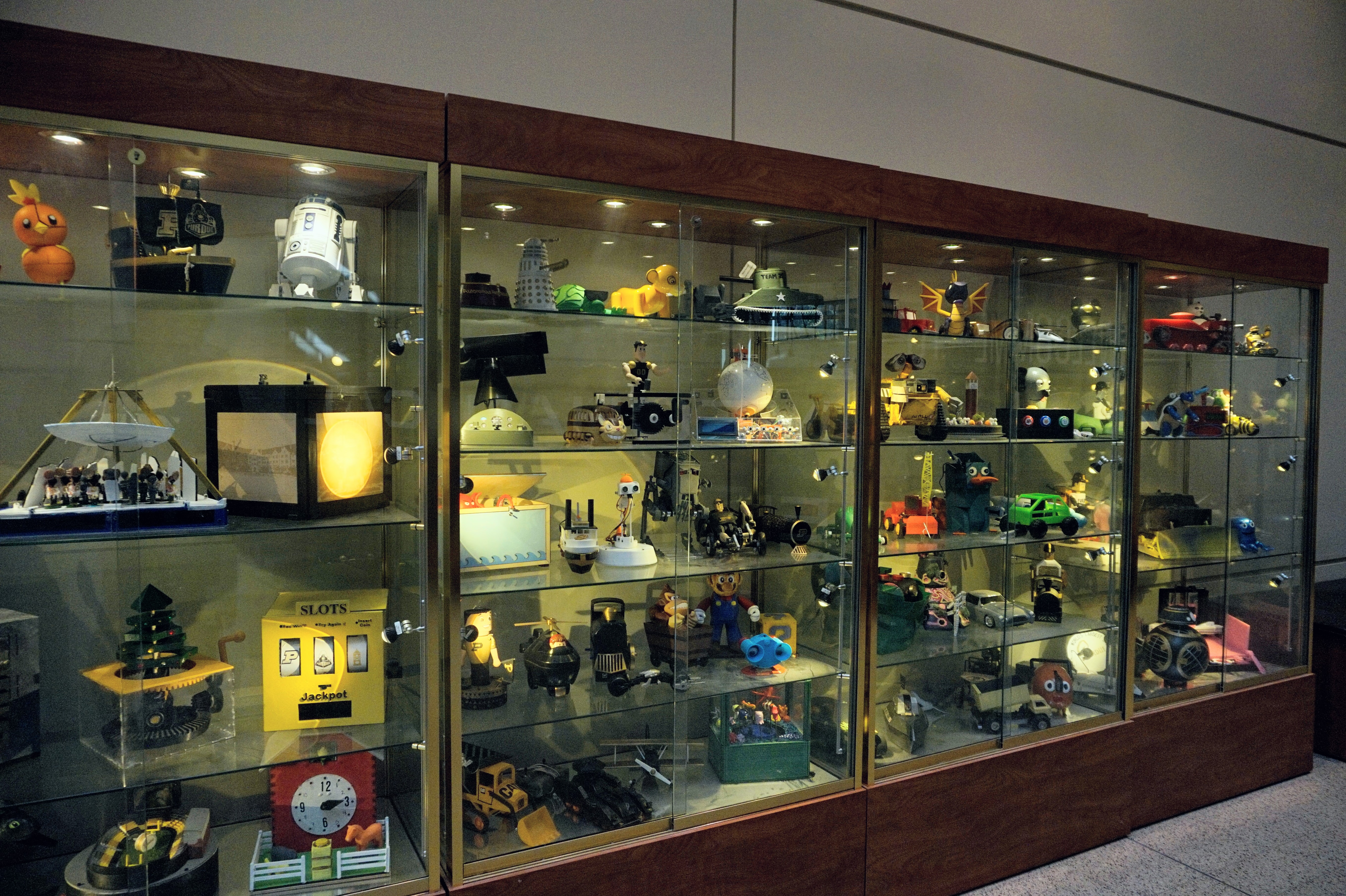
ME 444 Student Designed Toys

=== School Heads ===
Only non-interim heads are listed below.

- Eckhard A. Groll, 2019–
- Anil K. Bajaj, 2011–2019
- E. Daniel Hirleman, 1999-2010
- Frank P. Incropera, 1989-1998
- Winfred M. Phillips, 1980-1988
- Arthur H. Lefebvre, 1976-1980
- William B. Cottingham, 1971–1975
- Peter W. McFadden, 1966–1971
- Richard J. Grosh, 1962–1966
- Paul Chenea, 1959–1962
- Harry L. Solberg, 1941–1959
- Gilbert Amos "G.A." Young, 1912–1941
- Llewellyn Ludy, 1900–1912
- Charles Benjamin, 1898–1900
- John J. Flather, 1892–1898
- Lt. William Creighton, U.S.N., 1887–1892
- Lt. Albert Stahl, U.S.N., 1883–1887
- Lt. William Hamilton, U.S.A., 1882–1883

== Student organizations ==
- ASME – Purdue Student Chapter
- Purdue Mechanical engineering Ambassadors (PMEA)
- Formula SAE – Purdue Formula Team
- Baja SAE – Purdue Baja Team
- Purdue Electric Racing (PER) – PER Team
- Purdue Solar Racing – Purdue Team
- Pi Tau Sigma – Beta Chapter
- Women in Mechanical Engineering at Purdue (WiME)
- National Society of Black Engineers (NSBE) – Mother Chapter
- Society of Mexican American Engineers and Scientists (MAES)
- Society of Hispanic Professional Engineers (SHPE)
- Society of Women Engineers (SWE)
- Tau Beta Pi – National Engineering Honor Society
- Purdue Engineering Student Council (PESC)

== Notable alumni ==
- Maurice Zucrow – Aerospace engineer (1899–1975)
- Ray Ewry – American track and field athlete
- Gus Grissom – American astronaut (1926–1967)
- Jerry L. Ross – NASA astronaut and engineer (born 1948)
- Donald E. Williams – American test pilot, astronaut and engineer (1942–2016)
- Wayne Hale – American NASA engineer (born 1954)
- Scott D. Tingle – American astronaut (born 1965)
- Mohamed M. Atalla – Egyptian engineer (1924–2009)
- Richard Leroy Walters – American philanthropist (1931–2007)
- John H. Hager – American businessman and politician (1936–2020)
- Robert Altenkirch – American academic
- Allen Alley – American businessman and politician
- Moira Gunn – American podcaster
- Jill Hruby – American civil servant
- Patrick J. Loehrer – American oncologist and cancer center director
- Roger Linquist – American businessman
- Brent W. Webb – American professor (born 1956)
- Ali Argon – American engineer
- John Armstrong (model railroader)
- Melvin J. Glimcher – American pioneer in the development of artificial limbs
- Arcot Ramachandran – Indian scientist (1923–2018)
- Gerald D. Hines – American businessman (1925–2020)
- James J. Shuttleworth – American businessman (1937 – 2003)
- John R. Horne – American businessman (born 1939)
- Bala S. Manian – Indian-born Silicon Valley entrepreneur
- Don R. Berlin – American aerospace engineer (1898–1982)
- Bob Bowdon – American broadcast journalist
- Donald C. Burnham – American business executive (1915–2005)
- Robert D. Cess – American academic (1933–2022)
- Bob Charles (politician) – Australian politician
- Baratunde A. Cola – American nanotechnologist
- Carl W. Condit – American historian
- Clarence Cory – American engineer and educator
- Reid Ewing (planner) – American urban planner
- Chris Gabehart – American NASCAR crew chief (born 1981)
- Robert McFarland Gates – American mechanical and consulting engineer (1883-1962)
- Richard J. Grosh – American academic administrator (1927–2025)
- Edwin D. Harrison
- Dennis Hong – American roboticist
- John R. Horne – American businessman (born 1939)
- Larry Howell
- Anthony Jacobi – American scientist and engineer
- J. Tom Lendrum – American politician
- Carter B. Magruder – United States Army general (1900–1988)
- Glen W. Martin – United States Air Force general
- Gary Milhollin
- Irving Jacob Reuter – American businessman (1885–1972)
- Peter Riegel – American research engineer
- David Edward Ross
- Granville Sewell – American mathematician
- Thomas B. Sheridan – American engineer and professor
- Yeram S. Touloukian – American professor
- Raymond Viskanta – American scientist (1931–2021)
- Wang Buxuan – Chinese scientist in engineering thermophysics
- Jack Woolf
- Yan Hong-sen
- Lawrence Yun – American economist

== Notable faculty ==
=== Current Faculty ===
- Luciano Castillo, 2017–
- Pavlos Vlachos, 2013–
- John W. Sutherland, 2009–
- Gregory Shaver, 2006–
- R. Byron Pipes, 2004–
- Steve Wereley, 1999–
- Karthik Ramani, 1991–

=== Past Faculty ===
- Tahira Reid Smith, 2011–2023
- Qingyan Chen, 2002–2021
- Timothy S. Fisher, 2002–2020
- Suresh Garimella, 1989–2019
- Monika Ivantysynova, 2004–2018
- Jayathi Murthy, 2001–2012
- Raymond Viskanta, 1962–2001
- Frank P. Incropera, 1966–1998
- Arthur H. Lefebvre, 1976–1993
- Yeram S. Touloukian, 1948–1981
- Richard J. Grosh, 1953–1971
- Rufus Oldenburger, 1956–1969
- Andrey Abraham Potter, 1920–1953
- Ernestine Gilbreth Carey, 1925, 1935–1948
- William Freeman Myrick Goss, 1879–1907
