= Eckhard Groll =

Researcher and professor

- Born: Germany
- Employer: Purdue University
- Known for: HVAC and refrigeration
- Title: William E. and Florence E. Perry Head of Mechanical Engineering and Reilly Distinguished Professor of Mechanical Engineering

Eckhard A. Groll is a German-born American professor, researcher, and academic administrator. He is currently the Reilly Distinguished Professor of Mechanical Engineering and the William E. and Florence E. Perry Head of Mechanical Engineering at Purdue University. He is known for making numerous contributions to the heating, ventilation, air conditioning (HVAC), and refrigeration industry.

== Education and Career ==
Groll received his Diplom- Vorprufung (Pre-Diploma of Engineering) in mechanical engineering in 1986 and his Diplom- Ingenieur (Diploma of Engineering) in mechanical engineering in 1989 from the Ruhr University of Bochum in Bochum, Germany. He later received his Doktor- Ingenieur (Doctor of Engineering) in mechanical engineering in 1994 from the University of Hanover in Hanover, Germany.

After graduating, Groll became a faculty research assistant at the University of Maryland. In 1994 he made the move to Purdue University and started working for the School of Mechanical Engineering as an assistant professor. He became associate professor in 2000, full professor in 2005, Reilly Professor of Mechanical Engineering in 2013, and Reilly Distinguished Professor of Mechanical Engineering in 2024. In 2019 he was chosen to become Head of the School of Mechanical Engineering. Under his leadership, Purdue has become the largest mechanical engineering school in the country.

Groll has also held numerous administrative appointments at Purdue. In 2005, he was the Director of Global Initiatives, Cooperative Education and Professional Experiences where he helped develop the GEARE program. Following that he became the Director of the Office of Professional Practice in 2008, the Interim Assistant Dean of Engineering for Research in 2012 and the Associate Dean for Undergraduate and Graduate Education for the College of Engineering in 2018.

== Research ==
Groll's research focuses on thermodynamics, specifically as applied to heating, ventilation, air conditioning, and refrigeration (HVAC+R). He is a top-five lifetime scholar worldwide in the field of refrigeration. In 2018, he received the J&E Hall Gold Medal from the Institute of Refrigeration for his contributions to the positive displacement compressor analysis field.

During his time at Purdue, he created two living labs, the ReNEWW House and the DC Nanogrid House. Sponsored by Whirlpool, the ReNEWW House is retrofitted with renewable technologies to be net-zero energy, water and waste. The DC Nanogrid House focuses on converting AC powered homes to DC power. Both homes are located in West Lafayette.

He worked with NASA to design and build a refrigerator capable of making the normal vapor compression cycle function in microgravity. The three-year project culminated with the fridge enduring multiple zero-G test flights to prove its effectiveness.

Groll is also the co-director for the Center for High Performance Buildings (CHPB), which studies different building systems and equipment. CHPB is housed at the Ray W. Herrick Laboratories at Purdue University. He serves as the General Chair for the Herrick Conferences, one of the oldest and most-attended conferences for refrigeration and smart buildings.

== Awards ==
- 2024 F. Paul Anderson Award
- 2021 ASME Fellow
- 2018 J&E Hall International Gold Medal of Refrigeration
- 2017 Peter Ritter von Rittinger International Heat Pump Award
- 2011-2024 ASHRAE Distinguished Lecturer
- 2010-2011 ACE Fellow
- 2008 Inductee into Purdue Book of Great Teachers
