= Robert Gates (disambiguation) =

Robert Gates (born 1943) is an American intelligence analyst and university president.

Robert Gates may also refer to:

- Robert Franklin Gates (1906–1982), American artist
- Robert McFarland Gates (1883–1962), American engineer
- Bobby Gates (born 1985), American golfer

== See also ==
- Gates (surname)
