= Baratunde =

Baratunde is a given name. Notable people with the name include:

- Baratunde A. Cola (born 1981), American nanotechnologist
- Baratunde Thurston (born 1977), American comedian
