= Carol Handwerker =

American materials scientist

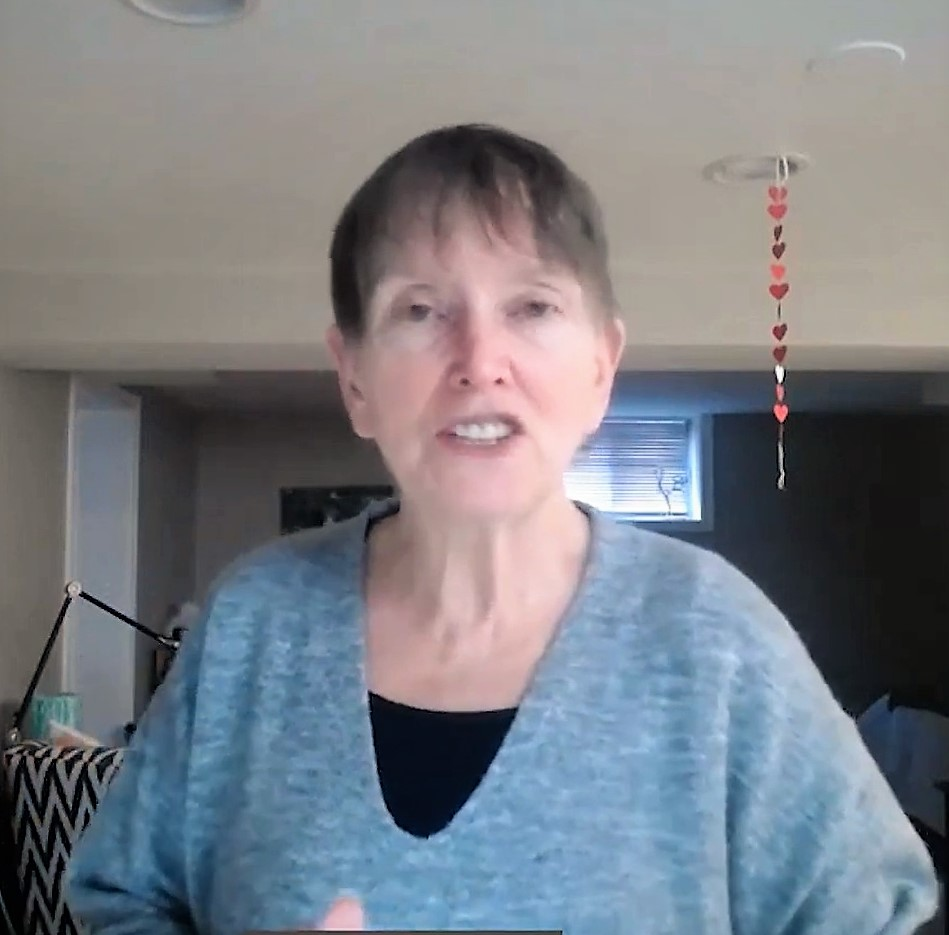
- Handwerker at a Purdue faculty panel discussion in 2021
- Education: Massachusetts Institute of Technology; Wellesley College
- Scientific career
- Workplaces: National Bureau of Standards; Purdue University
- Thesis: Sintering and grain growth of MgO (1983)

Carol Anne Handwerker is an American materials scientist. She is the Reinhardt Schuhmann Jr. Professor of Materials Engineering and Environmental and Ecological Engineering at Purdue University. She is a fellow of both The Minerals, Metals & Materials Society and the Materials Research Society.

== Early life and education ==
Professor Handwerker has said that she wanted to become a scientist at the age of nine. She attended Wellesley College, earning a B.A. in Art History. After graduating, she worked for an organization investigating air and water pollution where she realized that she was interested in engineering. She eventually joined Massachusetts Institute of Technology (MIT), where she studied and worked as an analyst at the MIT computer centre. At MIT, Professor Handwerker received another undergraduate degree in materials science and ceramics. She remained at MIT for graduate studies, where she earned her Ph.D. in Ceramics studying the grain growth of magnesium oxide (MgO).

== Research and career ==
Professor Handwerker began her career as a postdoctoral researcher in the National Bureau of Standards (now National Institute of Standards and Technology) in 1984. She was appointed to the metallurgical processing group at National Institute of Standards and Technology in 1986. She was promoted to Group Leader in 1994 followed by Chief of the Metallurgy Division in 1996. She joined Purdue University as a professor in the Materials Engineering department in 2005

Dr. Handwerker became an expert in materials for soldering. Working with the International Electronics Manufacturing Initiative (iNEMI), she developed a lead-free solder that could be used in microelectronics.

Her current research interests include the development and application of thermodynamic and kinetic theory and experiments of phase transformation and interface motion to complex industrial and scientific problems. Her group focuses on understanding how specific microstructure can be designed in polycrystalline materials and thin films by controlled interface properties. They also are developing models for how single crystal nanowires nucleate and grow using the vapor-liquid-solid (VLS) method to improve the manufacturing and reliability of the current generation of Pb-lead solder interconnects on printer circuit boards. They are also developing new nanoparticle-based interconnect structures for next generation circuit assembly.

She joined The Minerals, Metals & Materials Society during her early career, specifically the functional materials division.

== Awards and honors ==
- 1993 The American Ceramics Society Fellow
- 2008 ASM International Class of Fellows
- 2009 The Minerals, Metals, & Materials Society Leadership Award
- 2010 The Minerals, Metals & Materials Society Research to Industrial Practice Award
- 2017 The Minerals, Metals & Materials Society FMD John Bardeen Award
- 2018 Elected Fellow of The Minerals, Metals & Materials Society
- 2021 Elected Fellow of Materials Research Society
- 2021 Northwestern University Morris E. Fine Lecture
- 2025 W. David Kingery Award

== Selected publications ==
- K. -W. Moon; W. J. Boettinger; U. R. Kattner; F. S. Biancaniello; Handwerker, Carol Anne (2000). "Experimental and thermodynamic assessment of Sn-Ag-Cu solder alloys". Journal of Electronic Materials. 29 (10): 1122–1136. Bibcode:2000JEMat..29.1122M. doi:10.1007/s11664-000-0003-x. Wikidata Q56953704.
- Karthik Ramani; Devarajan Ramanujan; William Z. Bernstein; et al. (2010). "Integrated Sustainable Life Cycle Design: A Review". Journal of Mechanical Design. 132 (9). doi:10.1115/1.4002308. Wikidata Q105952457.
- J.E. Taylor; J.W. Cahn; Handwerker, Carol Anne (1992). "Overview No. 98 I—Geometric models of crystal growth". Acta Materialia. 40 (7): 1443–1474. doi:10.1016/0956-7151(92)90090-2. Wikidata Q105952482.

== Personal life ==
Handwerker met her husband, John Blendell, while studying at Massachusetts Institute of Technology. Together they have two daughters.
