= James Shuttleworth =

James Shuttleworth may refer to:

- James Shuttleworth (politician) (1714–1773), English Member of Parliament and High Sheriff of Yorkshire
- James J. Shuttleworth (1937–2003), inventor, entrepreneur and founder of Shuttleworth, Inc.
