= Adrienne Lavine =

American mechanical engineer

Adrienne S. Lavine (born 1958) is an American mechanical engineer specializing in heat transfer, thermal energy, and energy storage, and known as a coauthor of several widely used textbooks on heat transfer. She is a professor emeritus of mechanical and aerospace engineering at the University of California, Los Angeles, director of the UCLA Modeling of Complex Thermal Systems Laboratory, and a former associate vice provost at UCLA.

== Education and career ==
Lavine studied mechanical engineering at Brown University, graduating in 1979. After working for two years at Owens Corning in Columbus, Ohio, she returned to graduate study in mechanical engineering at the University of California, Berkeley, completing her Ph.D. in 1984. In the same year joined the UCLA Department of Mechanical and Aerospace Engineering. She served as chair of the UCLA Academic Senate from 2005 to 2006, chair of the Department of Mechanical and Aerospace Engineering from 2006 to 2011, and associate vice provost for the UCLA Center for the Advancement of Teaching, from 2017 to 2022. Lavine retired in July 2024 after 40 years at UCLA.

== Books ==
Lavine is a coauthor of books including:

- Introduction to Heat Transfer (with Frank P. Incropera, David P. Dewitt, and Theodore L. Bergman, Wiley; Lavine was added for the 5th edition, 2006)
- Fundamentals of Heat and Mass Transfer (with Incropera, Dewitt, and Bergman, Wiley; Lavine was added for the 6th edition, 2007)
- Principles of Heat and Mass Transfer (with Incropera, Dewitt, and Bergman, Wiley; Lavine was added for the 7th edition, 2013)

== Recognition ==
Lavine was a 1988 winner of the Presidential Young Investigator Award, and received the F. W. Taylor Medal of the International Academy for Production Engineering (CIRP) in 1990. She was elected as an ASME Fellow in 1999, and Lavine received the 2003 Samueli Teaching Award.

== Personal life ==
Lavine is married to Gregory Small, a screenwriter and film producer who graduated with her from Brown University in 1979; they celebrated their 40th anniversary in 2023, and they have two children.
