= Luciano Castillo =

Renewable energy engineer and fluid dynamicist

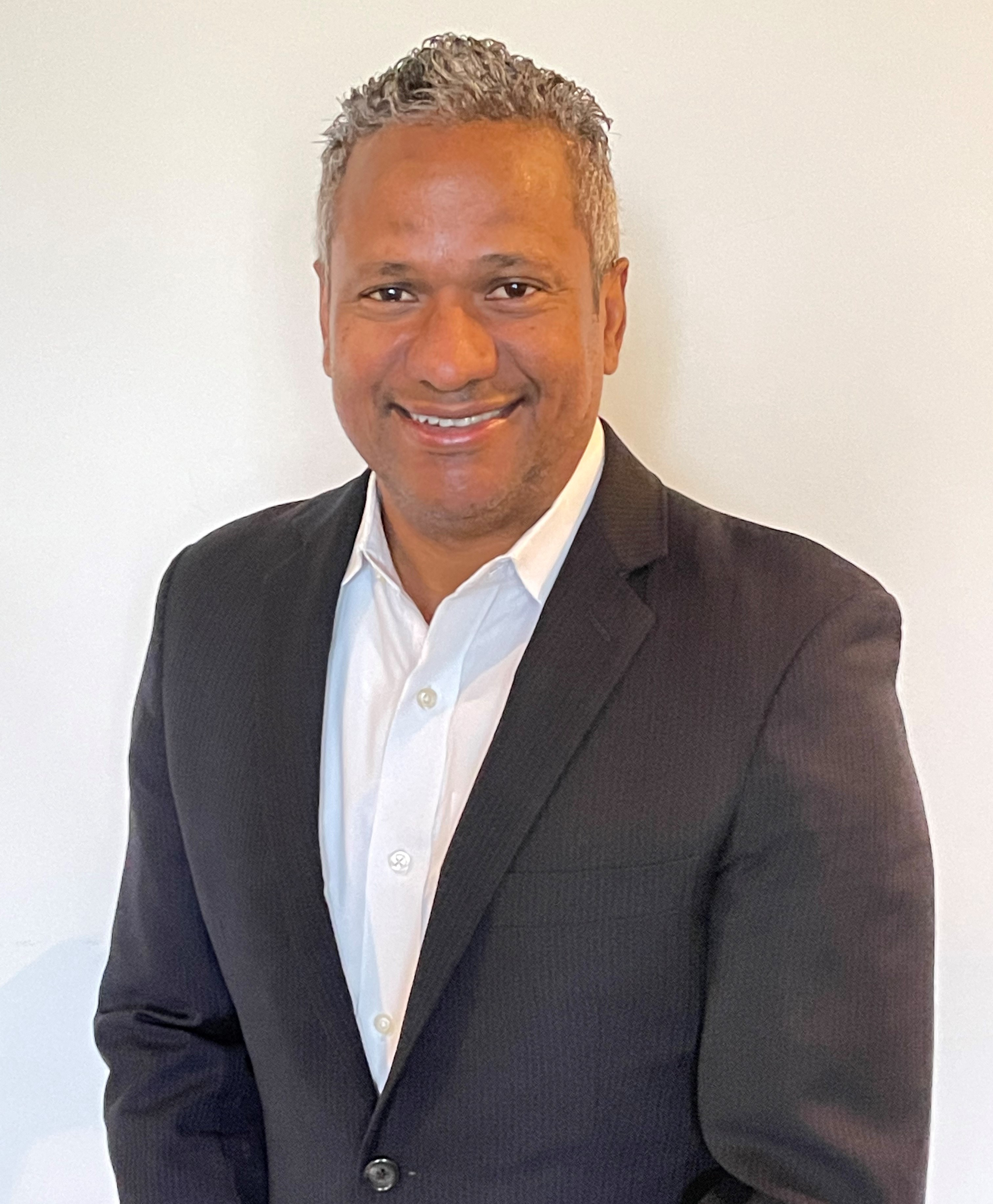
- Luciano Castillo in 2021
- Born: 6 December 1965 (age 60)
- Citizenship: American
- Education: State University of New York at Buffalo
- Scientific career
- Fields: Physics; Engineering; Energy
- Workplaces: Purdue University; Texas Tech University; Rensselaer Polytechnic Institute; Johns Hopkins University; State University of New York; Indiana Institute of Technology
- Thesis: Similarity Analysis of Turbulent Boundary Layers (1997)
- Doctoral advisor: William K. George

Luciano Castillo (born December 6, 1965, in Puerto Rico) is an engineer known for his work in theoretical and experimental fluid dynamics, turbulence and wind energy and for applying scaling analysis and asymptotic methods. He is currently the Kenninger Chair Professor of Renewable Energy and Power Systems in the School of Mechanical Engineering at Purdue University, West Lafayette, Indiana, where he is also the Dean's Faculty Fellow for Hispanic/Latino Engagement, Purdue University, (2019–present).

== Education ==
Luciano Castillo started his career at University of Puerto Rico at Mayagüez and transferred to the State University of New York at Buffalo (SUNY) where he earned his bachelor's degree (1990) and doctorate (1997) in mechanical engineering.

== Career ==
In 1999, Castillo joined the faculty at Rensselaer Polytechnic Institute, Troy, New York, as an assistant professor. In 2011, he joined Texas Tech University as Don-Kay-Clay Cash Distinguished Engineering Chair in Wind Energy and was also appointed as president of the National Wind Resource Center in Lubbock, Texas. in 2017, Castillo moved to Purdue University as the Kenninger Professor of Renewable Energy and Power Systems.

== Honors and awards (selected) ==
- National Academy of Engineering of Mexico, Foreign Corresponding Member (2020)
- Associate Fellow, American Institute of Aeronautics and Astronautics (AIAA) (2020).
- Fellow American Physical Society (APS), (2019).
- Fellow American Society of Mechanical Engineers (ASME), (2013).

== Selected publications ==
- George, William K.; Castillo, Luciano (1997). "Zero-pressure-gradient turbulent boundary layer". Applied Mechanics Reviews. 50 (12): 689–729. Bibcode:1997ApMRv..50..689G. doi:10.1115/1.3101858.
- Cal, Raúl Bayoán; Lebrón, José; Castillo, Luciano; Kang, Hyung Suk; Meneveau, Charles (2010). "Experimental study of the horizontally averaged flow structure in a model wind-turbine array boundary layer". Journal of Renewable and Sustainable Energy. 2: 013106. doi:10.1063/1.3289735.
- Chowdhury, Souma; Zhang, Jie; Messac, Achille; Castillo, Luciano (2012). "Unrestricted wind farm layout optimization (UWFLO): Investigating key factors influencing the maximum power generation". Renewable Energy. 38 (1): 16–30. Bibcode:2012REne...38...16C. doi:10.1016/j.renene.2011.06.033.
- Castillo, Luciano; George, William K. (2001). "Similarity analysis for turbulent boundary layer with pressure gradient: outer flow". AIAA Journal. 39 (1): 41–47. Bibcode:2001AIAAJ..39...41C. doi:10.2514/2.1300.
- Wosnik, Martin; Castillo, Luciano; George, William K. (2000). "A theory for turbulent pipe and channel flows". Journal of Fluid Mechanics. 421 (1): 115–145. Bibcode:2000JFM...421..115W. doi:10.1017/S0022112000001385. hdl:2142/112577. S2CID 122474872.
- Castillo, Luciano; T. Gunnar, Johansson (2002). "The effects of the upstream conditions on a low Reynolds number turbulent boundary layer with zero pressure gradient". Journal of Turbulence. 3 (1): N31. Bibcode:2002JTurb...3...31C. doi:10.1088/1468-5248/3/1/031.
- Castillo, Luciano; Walker, David (2002). "Effect of upstream conditions on the outer flow of turbulent boundary layers". AIAA Journal. 40 (7): 1292–1299. Bibcode:2002AIAAJ..40.1292C. doi:10.2514/2.1818.
- Walker, David; Castillo, Luciano (2002). "Effect of the initial conditions on turbulent boundary layers". AIAA Journal. 40: 12. doi:10.2514/6.2001-2912.
- Evans, Humberto Bocanegra; M. Hamed, Ali; Gorumlu, Serdar; Doosttalab, Ali; Aksak, Burak; P. Chamorro, Leonardo; Castillo, Luciano (2018). "Engineered bio-inspired coating for passive flow control". Proceedings of the National Academy of Sciences. 115 (6): 1210–1214. Bibcode:2018PNAS..115.1210B. doi:10.1073/pnas.1715567115. PMC 5819415. PMID 29367420.
- Evans, Humberto Bocanegra; Gorumlu, Serdar; Aksak, Burak; Castillo, Luciano (2016). "Holographic microscopy and microfluidics platform for measuring wall stress and 3D flow over surfaces textured by micro-pillars". Scientific Reports. 6: 1–12. Bibcode:2016NatSR...628753B. doi:10.1038/srep28753. PMC 4926118. PMID 27353632.
- Kazemi, Amirkhosro; Castillo, Luciano; Curet, Oscar M (2021). "Mangrove roots model suggest an optimal porosity to prevent erosion". Scientific Reports. 11 (1): 9969. Bibcode:2021NatSR..11.9969K. doi:10.1038/s41598-021-88119-5. PMC 8113374. PMID 33976300.
- Roggenburg, Michael; Warsinger, David M; Evans, Humberto Bocanegra; Castillo, Luciano (2021). "Combatting water scarcity and economic distress along the US-Mexico border using renewable powered desalination". Applied Energy. 291 116765. Bibcode:2021ApEn..29116765R. doi:10.1016/j.apenergy.2021.116765. S2CID 233583448.
