= Columbia Mishra =

Indian-American aerospace engineer

Columbia Mishra is an Indian and American aerospace engineer, the co-founder and chief technical officer of the Global Space Industry Trade Association.

== Early life, education, and career ==
Mishra originally comes from Malda, West Bengal. Her parents, space enthusiasts, named their three children after US spacecraft: Apollo, Challenger, and Columbia. One of Mishra's childhood heros was Indian-American astronaut Kalpana Chawla. She was educated at St. Xavier’s School of Malda, Salt Lake School in Kolkata, and Jadavpur University, where she received a bachelor's degree in mechanical engineering in 2006, including work experience at Tata Motors.

She came to the US for graduate study in mechanical engineering, and received a master's degree in 2008 from Texas Tech University, with research in microfluidics. After working for Makino in Singapore, and for Stress Engineering Services in Texas, she returned to graduate study at the University of Texas at Austin, focusing on thermal fluids and heat transport in graphene, and supervised there by Jayathi Murthy. During this time she also held an internship at Apple Inc. She completed her Ph.D. in 2016.

After completing her doctorate, Mishra returned to industry, working on thermal issues in photolithography for Intel in Oregon. In 2020, she returned to her childhood interest in space exploration with a move to Maxar Technologies, where she became a lead systems engineer, thermal lead for the power propulsion element of the Artemis program, and led the development of the flight computers for Maxar's Low Earth orbit satellites. After leaving Maxar, she became co-founder and chief technical officer of the Global Space Industry Trade Association. She is also a member of the board of the directors of the ASME Foundation of the American Society of Mechanical Engineers (ASME).

== Recognition ==
The ASME gave Mishra their inaugural Lakshmi Singh Early Career Leadership Award in 2020, and named her as an ASME Fellow in 2023. The University of Texas at Austin Walker Department of Mechanical Engineering named her as a distinguished alumna in 2022, and the Society of Women Engineers named her as an Emerging Leader in 2023.

== Other activities ==
Mishra has also competed in pageants, "to raise awareness about social issues, including women’s representation in STEM". She was Miss India Oregon 2019, and Miss Asia California Global 2021.
