= Jayathi Murthy =

Indian-American mechanical engineer

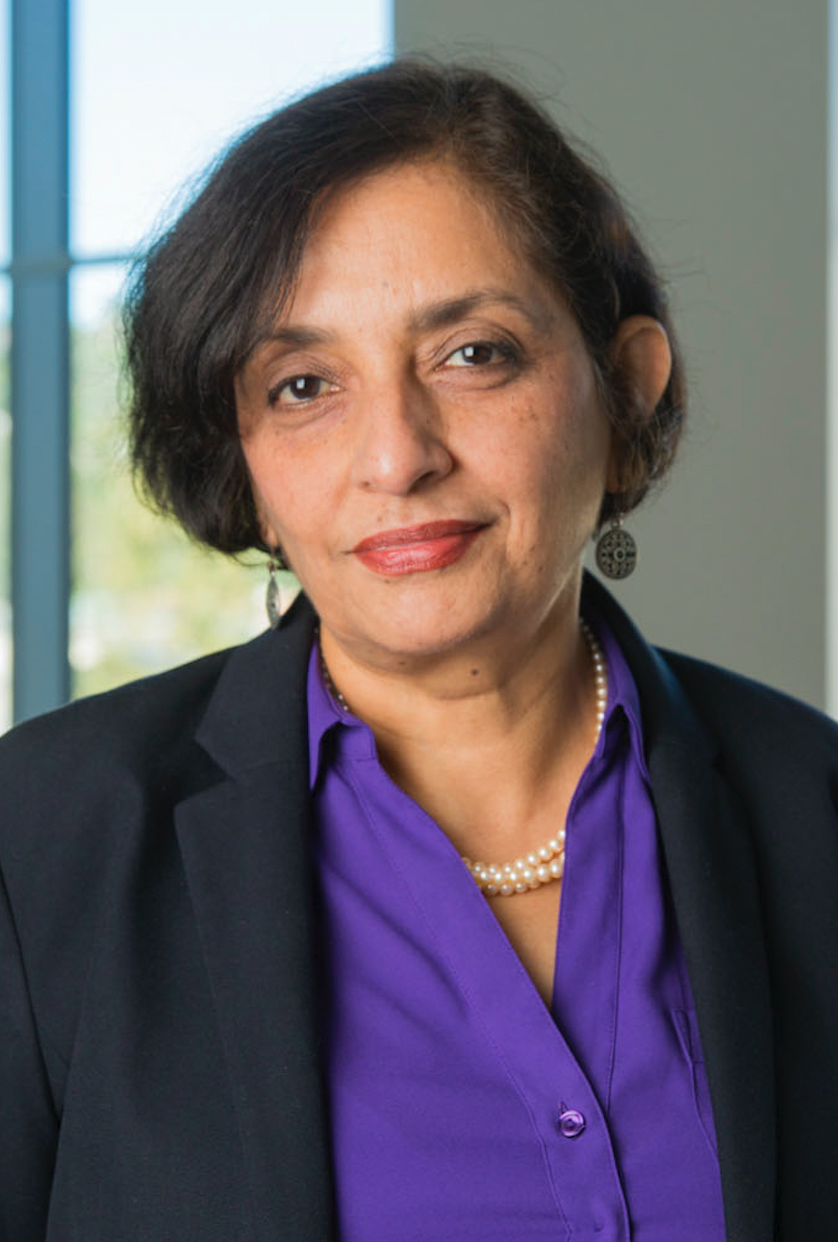
- Murthy in 2021

16th President of Oregon State University
- Incumbent
- Assumed office September 9, 2022
- Preceded by: F. King Alexander; Becky Johnson (interim)

Personal details
- Education: Indian Institute of Technology Kanpur (BS); Washington State University (MS); University of Minnesota (PhD)
- Scientific career
- Fields: Mechanical engineering
- Institutions: Arizona State University; Carnegie Mellon University; Purdue University; University of Texas at Austin; University of California, Los Angeles; Oregon State University
- Thesis: A calculation procedure for the prediction of confined flow through irregular geometries (computational, fluid, mechanics) (1984)
- Doctoral advisor: Suhas Patankar
- Doctoral students: Columbia Mishra

Jayathi Y. Murthy is an Indian-American mechanical engineer who is the president of Oregon State University. Previously, she was the Ronald and Valerie Sugar Dean of the UCLA Henry Samueli School of Engineering and Applied Science at the University of California, Los Angeles where she was also a distinguished professor. Her research interests include macroelectronics, computational fluid dynamics, heat transfer, and phase-change materials. Murthy has served on the Engineering and Computer Science jury for the Infosys Prize since 2018.

== Education and career ==
Murthy is the daughter of an Indian civil engineer. Originally from Hyderabad, she was a student at St. Ann's High School, Secunderabad. After graduating from the Indian Institute of Technology Kanpur, she earned a master's degree at Washington State University before completing her Ph.D. in mechanical engineering in 1984 at the University of Minnesota.

Murthy became an assistant professor of mechanical engineering at Arizona State University in 1984, but left academia in 1988 to join Fluent Inc., a computational fluid dynamics firm, where she served in various key positions including Manager, New Business Development Group and Manager, R&D. Fluent Inc. was later acquired by Ansys. She returned to academia in 1998 as an associate professor of mechanical engineering at Carnegie Mellon University, moved to Purdue University in 2001, and became Robert V. Adams Professor of Mechanical Engineering there in 2008. She moved again to the University of Texas at Austin in 2012, as department chair.

From 2008-2014, Murthy served as the director of the Center for Prediction of Reliability, Integrity and Survivability of Microsystems (PRISM), a center of excellence supported by the National Nuclear Security Administration (NNSA).

In 2016, Murthy became dean at the UCLA Samueli School of Engineering, the first woman dean in the engineering school's history. She established the UCLA Women in Engineering program (WE@UCLA), which is committed to enabling the full participation, success, and advancement of women in engineering and computer science, and is open to all students who support this mission.

As of June 7, 2022, Murthy was officially announced as the President of Oregon State University by the board of trustees. She took office September 9, 2022.

== Recent research ==
Murthy's recent research has addressed sub-micron thermal transport, multiscale multi-physics simulations of micro- and nano-electromechanical systems (MEMS and NEMS), and the uncertainty quantifications involved in those systems.

== Recognition ==
In 2020, Murthy was elected a member of the National Academy of Engineering "for the development of unstructured solution-adaptive finite volume methods for heat, mass, and momentum transport." She is a foreign fellow of the Indian National Academy of Engineering (INAE) and a fellow of the American Society of Mechanical Engineers (ASME).

With Brent W. Webb and Raj M. Manglik, Murthy won the ASME Heat Transfer Memorial Award in 2016, and she was the 2012 winner of the ASME K16 Clock Award for "outstanding and continuing contributions to the science and engineering of heat transfer in electronics".

Murthy is the author of more than 330 technical publications, an editor of the second edition of the Handbook of Numerical Heat Transfer, and serves on the editorial boards of Numerical Heat Transfer and the International Journal of Thermal Sciences.
