= Institute for Liquid Atomization and Spray Systems =

Engineering society

The Institute for Liquid Atomization and Spray Systems, (ILASS), is an organization of researchers, industrial practitioners and students engaged in professional activities connected with the spraying of liquids and slurries. Annual technical conferences are organized by each of the ILASS organizations ILASS-Americas, ILASS-Asia, and ILASS-Europe. ILASS-International is board made up of representatives from the three regional ILASS Institutes.

ILASS meetings have practitioner and researchers from many areas where spray technology is utilized. This includes injectors for gas turbines, rockets, and diesels, agricultural and medical sprays, industrial sprays, fire protection, paint and coating applications, liquid combustion, and many others. This breadth of spray applications at this conference and technical community provides cross-fertilization of research methodologies and innovative efforts. Mechanical, agricultural and chemical engineers all participate in these meetings.

The ILASS (Institute for Liquid Atomization and Spray Systems) organization is an international organization dedicated to the advancement of knowledge and technology in the field of liquid atomization and spray systems.

The ILASS global organization has three branches: ILASS-Europe, ILASS-Americas, and ILASS Asia. ILASS-Europe was the first to be established, and was founded in 1982 as initiative of the late Prof. Paul Eisenklam. The first Annual General Meeting took place at UMIST 1983. The Institute’s objectives have remained unchanged since that time: “… to promote the science and applications of liquid atomization and spray systems by means of sponsorship of annual scientific meetings, promotion and preparation of technical papers, and promotion of membership in ILASS Europe among interested and qualified persons…”

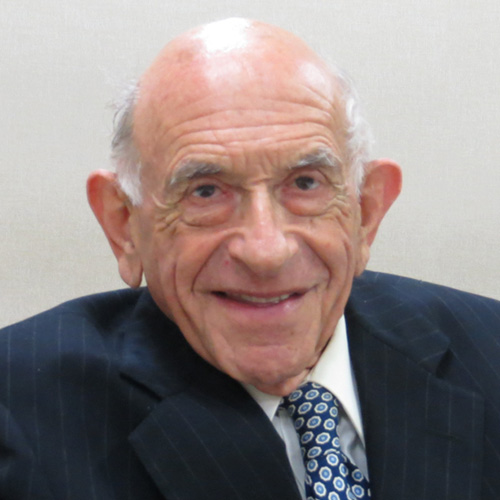
Prof. Chigier

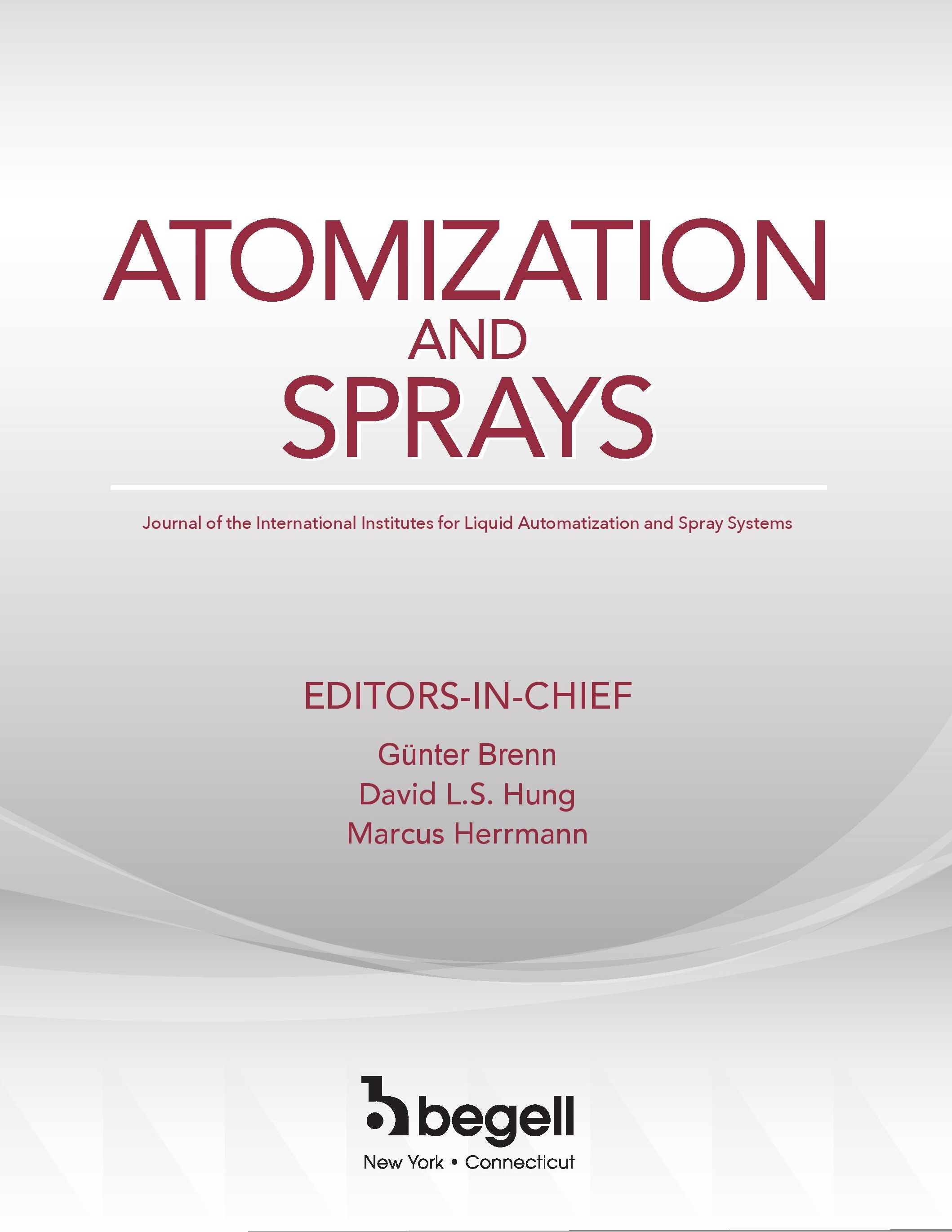

Prof. Norman Chigier, one of the leaders of the atomization and spraying systems community and the ILASS organization founded in 1991 the Atomization and Sprays Journal that focuses publishing, peer-reviewed papers on the topics that are central to ILASS.

ILASS organizes conferences, and symposia annually in each of its branches, and every three years, three regional ILASS institutes gather in a joint conference, entitled ICLASS (International Conference of Liquid Atomization and Spray Systems).

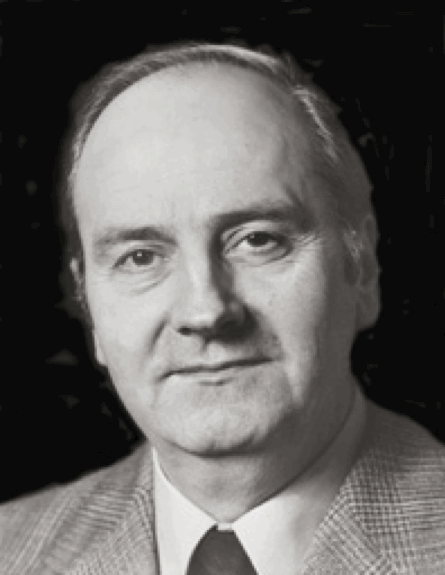
Prof. Lefebvre

Three awards are granted at each conference, honouring Professor Paul Eisenklam, Professor Arthur H. Lefebvre, and Professor Y. Tanasawa.

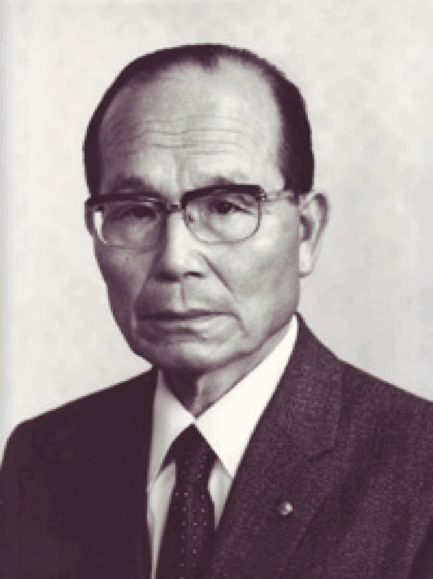
Prof.Tanasawa
