= Carrie Hall (engineer) =

American mechanical engineer

Carrie Michele Hall is an American mechanical engineer whose research applies control theory to internal combustion engines in order to allow them to run more efficiently and use alternative fuels, and the harvesting of renewable energy through wave power. She is a professor in the Department of Mechanical, Materials, and Aerospace Engineering at the Illinois Institute of Technology.

== Education and career ==
Hall graduated from Bob Jones University in 2008. She continued her studies at Purdue University, where she received a master's degree in mechanical engineering in 2010 and completed her Ph.D. in 2012. Her dissertation, Fuel-flexible combustion control of modern compression-ignition and spark-ignition engines, was supervised by Gregory Shaver.

After postdoctoral research at Purdue as a visiting assistant professor of mechanical engineering, she joined the Illinois Tech faculty as an assistant professor of mechanical engineering in 2013. She was promoted to associate professor in 2019.

== Recognition ==
Hall received a National Science Foundation CAREER Award in 2016, and was named as a Fulbright Scholar in 2022, funding her for a visit to Lancaster University in the UK.

In 2024, the American Society of Mechanical Engineers (ASME) named Hall as an ASME Fellow, "for contributions to research and education in the field of automotive powertrain dynamics and control, particularly in the modeling and control of engine systems that leverage advanced combustion modes, and the development of estimation and control techniques that enable clean and efficient utilization of alternative liquid and gaseous fuels".
