= Gregory Shaver =

American mechanical engineer and academic

Gregory Matthew Shaver
- Born: United States
- Occupations: Mechanical engineer, and academic
- Title: Director, Ray W. Herrick Labs

Academic background
- Education: B.S. Mechanical Engineering; M.S. Mechanical Engineering; PhD, Mechanical Engineering
- Alma mater: Purdue University; Stanford University

Academic work
- Institutions: Purdue University
- Doctoral students: Carrie Hall
- Website: www.gregshaver.com

Gregory Matthew Shaver is an American mechanical engineer and an academic. He is the director of Ray W. Herrick Laboratories and is a professor at Purdue University.

Shaver is most known for his works on thermodynamics, systems, measurements and controls, primarily focusing on combustion, transportation, sustainable energy and human-machine interaction. His works have been published in academic journals, including Journal of Engineering Education and Journal of Power Sources. He is the recipient of 2011 Max Bentele Award for engine technology innovation from SAE International.

== Education ==
Shaver earned his BS in Mechanical Engineering from Purdue University in 2000, followed by an M.S. in Mechanical Engineering from Stanford University in 2004. He later obtained a PhD in Mechanical Engineering from Stanford in 2005.

== Career ==
Shaver was a graduate research assistant at Stanford University from 2000 to 2005. He later transitioned to Purdue University, where he held various roles, including assistant professor from 2006 to 2011 and associate professor from 2011 to 2016. Since 2016, he has served as a full professor and director of the Ray W. Herrick Laboratories at Purdue University, a position he has held since 2022.

== Research ==
Shaver's research in internal combustion engines, hybrid-electric powertrains, and vehicle automation systems has focus on improving the safety and efficiency of commercial vehicles while minimizing their environmental footprint. His research on variable valve actuation (VVA) in compression ignition engines has driven substantial reductions in commercial vehicle emissions.

Shaver's work in physics-based, closed-loop estimation and control for variable biodiesel/diesel blends have demonstrated the capacity to eliminate the NOx increase associated with biodiesel while maintaining over 50% particulate matter reductions, showcasing the technology's adaptability to any biodiesel percentage and feedstock for flexible fuel options in evolving markets. He conducted research on modeling and estimating piezoelectric fuel injection systems focused on enhancing the efficiency and environmental cleanliness of combustion engines. He led research in commercial vehicle automation for trucking and agriculture. Their work on truck platooning achieved up to 15% fuel and CO_{2} reductions.

Shaver partnered with John Deere to create automated technology for combine harvesters used in corn, soybean, and wheat crop harvesting. This collaboration involved the creation of sophisticated control algorithms and innovative lidar/camera perception methods. His recent research endeavors are focused on refining powertrain controls for plug-in hybrid electric and hybrid electric commercial trucks and non-road machines. Furthermore, his work has demonstrated the economic feasibility of plug-in hybrid electric solutions in commercial trucks by the years 2025–2030. This extends to optimizing power management for electrically assisted wheel loaders.

== Awards and honors ==
- 2011 – SAE Max Bentele Award for Engine Technology Innovation, SAE International
- 2013 – Ralph Teetor Educational Award, SAE International
- 2014 – Early Career Excellence in Research Award, Purdue University
- 2019 – SAE John Johnson Best Paper Award for Outstanding Research in Diesel Engines, SAE
- 2020 – Elected ASME Fellow, American Society of Mechanical Engineers
- 2022 – Impact on Industry Award, Purdue University

== Selected articles ==
- Shaver, G. M., Gerdes, J. C., Jain, P., Caton, P. A., & Edwards, C. F. (2003, June). Modeling for control of HCCI engines. In Proceedings of the 2003 American Control Conference, 2003. (Vol. 1, pp. 749–754). IEEE.
- Shaver, G. M., Gerdes, J. C., Roelle, M. J., Caton, P. A., & Edwards, C. F. (2005). Dynamic modeling of residual-affected homogeneous charge compression ignition engines with variable valve actuation.
- Shaver, G. M., Roelle, M. J., & Gerdes, J. C. (2006). Modeling cycle-to-cycle dynamics and mode transition in HCCI engines with variable valve actuation. Control Engineering Practice, 14(3), 213–222.
- Yadav, A., Shaver, G. M., & Meckl, P. (2010). Lessons learned: Implementing the case teaching method in a mechanical engineering course. Journal of Engineering Education, 99(1), 55–69.
- Jin, X., Vora, A., Hoshing, V., Saha, T., Shaver, G., García, R. E., ... & Varigonda, S. (2017). Physically based reduced-order capacity loss model for graphite anodes in Li-ion battery cells. Journal of Power Sources, 342, 750–761.
