= Raymond Viskanta =

American scientist (1931–2021)

Raymond Viskanta (16 July 1931 – 27 December 2021) was the W. F. M. Goss Professor of Engineering at Purdue University. His field of study encompassed a range of topics in convection and radiation heat transfer.

Viskanta was born in Marijampolė, Lithuania. His family fled Lithuania in 1944 during World War II and settled near the city of Nienburg in Germany. Following the war, his family moved to a displaced persons camp in West Germany. They emigrated to the United States in 1949.

Viskanta eventually moved to Chicago, where he worked in a factory and attended evening high school. He received his diploma in 1951, and enrolled as a full-time student at the University of Illinois at Navy Pier. He received his bachelor's degree in 1955 and he completed his master's degree at Purdue University in 1956.

He worked as a mechanical engineer at Argonne National Laboratory and received a U.S. Atomic Energy Commission fellowship. Following this, he returned to Purdue to complete his PhD. He joined the Purdue faculty as a professor in mechanical engineering in 1962. He was named W.F.M. Goss Distinguished Professor of Engineering in 1986.

Viskanta published over 540 publications in 50 different journals in the U.S., Europe, and Japan. He was listed as an ISI Highly Cited Author in Engineering by the ISI Web of Knowledge, Thomson Scientific Company. Several awards are given in his honor, including the Viskanta Fellowship Lecture by Purdue, and Elsevier's Raymond Viskanta Award.

== Awards and honors ==
- Heat Transfer Memorial Award, American Society of Mechanical Engineers (ASME), 1976
- Fellow, ASME, 1976
- Thermophysics Award, American Institute of Aeronautics and Astronautics (AIAA), 1979
- Senior Research Award, American Society for Engineering Education, 1984
- Distinguished Engineering Alumnus, University of Illinois, 1984
- ASME/AIChE Max Jakob Memorial Award, 1986
- ASME Heat Transfer Best Paper Award, 1986
- ASME Melville Medal, 1988
- Fellow, AIAA, 1988
- Nusselt-Reynolds Prize, Assembly of World Conferences on Experimental Heat Transfer, Fluid Mechanics and Thermodynamics, 1991
- Thermal Engineering Award for International Activity, Japan Society of Mechanical Engineers, 1994
- Thurston Medal, American Society of Mechanical Engineers, 1997
- Stodola Medal, Swiss Federal Institute of Technology Zurich, 2007
- Elected to the National Academy of Engineering, 1987
- Foreign Member, Lithuanian Academy of Sciences, 1990
- Foreign Member, National Academy of Engineering Sciences of the Russian Federation, 1995
- Honorary Doctorate of Engineering, Technical University of Munich, 1994
- Honorary Doctorate of Engineering, Purdue University, 2007
