= Richard J. Grosh =

American academic administrator (1927–2025)

Richard Joseph Grosh (October 29, 1927 – January 23, 2025) was an American academic administrator who was the thirteenth president of Rensselaer Polytechnic Institute.

== Life and career ==
Grosh was born in Fort Wayne, Indiana on October 29, 1927. He attended Purdue University, where he received B.S., M.S. and P.h.D. degrees in mechanical engineering (in 1950, 1952 and 1953 respectively). In 1953, he was appointed assistant professor of mechanical engineering at Purdue. In 1953, he was appointed professor of mechanical engineering and in 1961, he was appointed head of the School of Mechanical Engineering at Purdue. In 1965, he was named associate dean of the Schools of Engineering. In 1967, he was appointed dean of the Schools of Engineering. In 1971, he was appointed president of Rensselaer Polytechnic Institute. In 1976, he left Rensselaer to become CEO of Ranco Inc. of Columbus, Ohio and remained in that post until the company was acquired by Invensys in 1987.

In 1969, he was elected as a member into the National Academy of Engineering for significant contributions to heat transfer research. In 1991, he received the Outstanding Mechanical Engineer Award from the Purdue University School of Mechanical Engineering. He served on the board of the Maine Maritime Academy from 1997 until 2012.

Grosh died at his home in Brooklin, Maine, on January 23, 2025, at the age of 97.

Academic offices
Preceded by Richard G. Folsom	President of Rensselaer Polytechnic Institute; 1971 – 1976	Succeeded by George Low
