= Arthur H. Lefebvre =

Arthur Henry Lefebvre (14 March 1923 – 24 November 2003) was a British scientist and an innovative leader in the science and engineering of fuel sprays and combustion in gas turbines.

== Career ==
During his career he developed several innovative atomizers, including prefilming (in the 1960s) and effervescent (in the 1990s) designs for aircraft engines. Improvements in atomization greatly reduced the emissions of soot (particulate combustion product) and were instrumental in increasing the reliability of the combustor that was critical to improve the engine robustness. Lefebvre was a pioneer in the development of the jet engine, and arguably one who contributed more as a researcher, designer and educator than any other, except the original inventors – Sir Frank Whittle and Hans von Ohain. He shared his expertise with an annual week-long gas turbine combustion short course from 1962 to 2003.

His memory is honored at each International Conference on Liquid Atomization and Spray Systems (ICLASS) with a Lecture named in his honor.

== Biography ==
=== Education ===
Long Eaton Grammar School, Nottingham, University of London BSc in Engineering in 1946 from University College. He received PhD from Imperial College in 1952 and a Doctor of Science (DSc) from Imperial College in 1975.

Cranfield University (Britain) : Professor and Head of the Department of Aircraft Propulsion and Chief Research Engineer at Rolls-Royce Limited, Derby. 1961–1976.

Purdue University (USA) 1976–1993 Head of the Department of Mechanical Engineering, Purdue University and Reilly Professor of Combustion Engineering in 1980

After retiring, Lefebvre was concurrently made Emeritus Professor by Purdue and Cranfield Universities.

He co-authored over 160 archival publications, 13 patents and 3 books (Gas Turbine Combustion, Gas Turbine Combustor Design Problems, and Atomization and Sprays). His book Atomization and Sprays is a guide to a generation of researchers and engineers on the development and use of spray science and technology.

Lefebvre invented and introduced the concept of air-blast atomization, which transformed fuel injection in combustors. He initiated some of the earliest research on atomization and spray structure. As a founding member and regular participant at conferences of the Institute of Liquid Atomization and Spray Systems Americas (ILASS) he taught a generation of scientists.

=== Quotes ===
Tools are not a substitute for innovation, 2000

=== Recognition ===
ASME Gas Turbine Award (1984)

ASME R. Tom Sawyer Award (1984)

AIAA Propellants and Combustion Award (inaugural recipient in 1990)

Marshal Award from the Institute of Liquid Atomization and Spray Systems, ILASS, (1993)

IGTI Scholar Award (1995)

IGTI Aircraft Engine Technology Award (1996)

ASME George Westinghouse Gold Medal (2002)

Fellow of the Royal Aeronautical Society and the Royal Academy of Engineering in the U.K.

== Personal life ==
He married Elizabeth Marcella Betts in 1952. They had two sons and one daughter.
