= John R. Horne =

American businessman (born 1939)

- Born: c. 1939
- Education: Purdue University; Bradley University
- Occupation: Businessman

John R. Horne (born c. 1939) is an American businessman. He served as the chief executive officer of Navistar from 1995 to 2003.

== Early life ==
John R. Horne was born circa 1939. He graduated from Purdue University, where he earned a Bachelor of Science degree in mechanical engineering in 1960, and he earned a Master of Science degree in mechanical engineering from Bradley University in 1964.

== Career ==
Horne began his career at Caterpillar Inc. By 1966, he was hired by International Harvester, later known as Navistar. He eventually served as its chief operating officer from 1990 to 1995, and its chief executive officer from 1995 to 2003.

Horne served on the board of directors of the Corrections Corporation of America (now known as CoreCivic) from 2001 to 2014.
