= Engineering Projects in Community Service =

Engineering Projects in Community Service (EPICS) was founded in 1995 at Purdue University by Professors Edward Coyle and Leah Jamieson as a solution to two problems. First, many engineering graduates lacked real world skills needed for project management, such as budgeting and scheduling. Second, many non-profit organizations did not have funding for needed professional engineering services to design displays and exhibits or keep relevant databases. The solution was to use the skills of undergraduate students through the curriculum to provide services to local non-profit organizations.

The program originally started as an educational program, and finds its roots in the concept of "service learning".

In liberal arts colleges, EPICS courses manage to encourage enrollment from students from outside the engineering program.

== History ==
EPICS was founded in the Fall of 1995 at Purdue University starting with five project teams. At Purdue, the program has grown to 25 project teams which include over 400 students. In 2000, the program was expanded and implemented at other universities. Today EPICS is operating at 15 universities across the United States, including Princeton University, University of Notre Dame, Dartmouth College, Penn State University, University of Wisconsin–Madison, Ohio State University, Arizona State University, and University of California, Merced.

The University of Auckland in Auckland, New Zealand is the only university that runs the EPICS programme internationally.

=== EPICS Learning Community at Purdue ===
At Purdue, EPICS is offered as a learning community to freshman students in the First Year Engineering program. The learning community program requires that students live in a specific university residence with other students in the EPICS program. Students are assigned roommates of the same gender and in the past Harrison Hall has been the location of the EPICS learning community. The EPICS students occupy most of a floor of Harrison (for men) but are split to separate towers by gender. In addition, students in the EPICS learning community will take some courses together, usually freshmen English (English 106) and the first part of the freshmen engineering course (previously ENGR195). Freshmen in EPICS are assigned to specific EPICS teams (not by roommate). These teams work with a community partner to meet a particular need. Some examples of teams include the Columbian Park Zoo team which designs enrichment devices for animals at the local zoo and the Habitat for Humanity team which helps to plan sustainable housing. EPICS functions as a class usually with a set number of lecture sessions to attend each semester and weekly lab time with teams. Documentation and design reviews are important parts of EPICS. Students learn to keep design notebooks and record project information. Near the midpoint and end of the semester, students present their work in a design review to professional engineers. These are very important events in EPICS and serve as a key time for students to receive feedback on their work. Students who enter EPICS as freshmen engineers are required to be part of the course portion only for the first semester, although they can opt to continue in future semesters.

EPICS at Arizona State University EPICS came to ASU in 2008. It is described as a way to help students engage in real-world engineering problems while they are still in school. The success of the program at the university level led to the creation of EPICS High, a similar program adapted for high schools and middle schools.

In 2017, five students finished their charity project started through the EPICS program in 2013, a mobile dental clinic that will serve thousands of people in Nicaragua, Arizona and California. It was said to be one of the most ambitious projects to come out of the program. The students took on the project to assist IMAHelps, a California non-profit. Catalina Laboratory Products, a Tucson-based startup, donated thousands of dollars to help furnish and stock the clinic.
