= Reid Ewing (planner) =

American urban planner

- Born: June 10, 1947
- Education: B.S. Mechanical Engineering, Purdue University; M.S. Engineering and Applied Physics and M.C.P., Harvard University; Ph.D. Urban Planning and Transportation Systems, Massachusetts Institute of Technology
- Awards: Received Best Article Award by American Planning Association
- Scientific career
- Workplaces: University of Utah Rutgers University(Voorhees Transportation Center) University of Maryland (National Center for Smart Growth)
- Website: faculty.utah.edu

Reid H. Ewing (born June 10, 1947) is an American urban planner and distinguished professor of city and metropolitan planning and a distinguished research chair for resilient places at the University of Utah. He directs the Metropolitan Research Center and writes the long-running column "Planning Research You Can Use" for Planning magazine, published by the American Planning Association. Ewing is among the most highly cited scholars in urban planning. According to Google Scholar, his work has accumulated more than 49,000 citations, making him one the most cited figures in the field of urban planning and transportation resreach. His 2010 meta-analysis with Robert Cervero, "Travel and the Built Environment," published in the Journal of the American Planning Association, is one of the most cited and downloaded articles in that journal's history.

== Education ==
Ewing received his Bachelor of Science in Mechanical Engineering from Purdue University, followed by his Master of Science in Engineering and Applied Physics and Master of City Planning from Harvard University. Later on, he earned his Doctor of Philosophy in Urban Planning and Transportation Systems from Massachusetts Institute of Technology.

== Career ==
Early career and public service

Early in his career, Ewing served two terms in the Arizona House of Representatives, representing a district in northwest Tucson. He Previously worked as a research analyst at the Congressional Budget Office in Washington, D.C.

Academic positions

Ewing served as director of the Voorhees Transportation Center at Rutgers University and as an associate professor at the National Center for Smart Growth at the University of Maryland before joining the University of Utah, where he has been a faculty member in the Department of City and Metropolitan Planning since the early 2000s.

At Utah, Ewing has served as Chair of the Department of City and Metropolitan Planning and as founding director of the Metropolitan Research Center. He is an associate editor of the Journal of the American Planning Association and serves on the editorial boards of Cities, the Journal of Planning Education and Research, and Landscape and Urban Planning.

== Research ==
Travel and the built environment

Ewing's most widely cited work is a 2010 meta-analysis co-authored with Robert Cervero of the University of California,Berkeley. Titled "Travel and the Built Environment: A Meta-Analysis," it was published in the Journal of the American Planning Association (76[3], pp. 265–294) and is one of the most cited and downloaded articles in that journal's history.

The paper synthesized a large body of empirical literature on the relationship between land use,urban design and travel behavior,and helped establish the "5Ds" framework — density, diversity, design, destination accessibility, and distance to transit — as a standard analytical lens in planning theory and practice.It found that while travel behavior is generally inelastic with respect to changes in the built environment,land use factors such as destination accessibility and street network design are most strongly associated with reductions in vehicle miles traveled.

Urban sprawl and public health

Ewing has produced an extensive body of research on the relationship between urban sprawl and physical activity, obesity,and morbidity. A 2014 study with Gail Meakins,Shima Hamidi, and Arthur C. Nelson, published in Health & Place, updated and refined the evidence base on these associations.Earlier research including "Characteristics,Causes, and Effects of Sprawl:A Literature Review" (2008) is a standard reference in the sprawl literature.

Walkability and urban design

Ewing has also contributed to the measurement of walkability.His 2009 study with Susan Handy, "Measuring the Unmeasurable:Urban Design Qualities Related to Walkability,"published in the Journal of Urban Design, developed a systematic framework for quantifying urban design qualities related to walking behavior.

== Awards and Recognition ==
• Best Article Award, AmericanPlanning Association, 2010 (for the 2010 meta-analysis with Cervero)

• Best Paper of the Year, Institute of Transportation Engineers District 6, 2005

• Best Feature Award,American Planning Association,1997

• Best Technical Paper, Institute of Transportation Engineers, 1993

== Selected Books ==
Ewing has written several books, among them:

- Advanced Quantitative Research Methods for Urban Planners. 2020.
- Best Development Practices: Doing the Right Thing and Making Money at the Same Time. 1996, listed by the American Planning Association as one of the 100 "essential" books in planning over the past 100 years.
- Growing Cooler: The Evidence on Urban Development and Climate Change 2008.
- Pedestrian and Transit-Oriented Design.Co-published by the Urban Land Institute and the American Planning Association.

== Selected Peer-Reviewed Articles ==
- Ewing has published more than 100 peer-reviewed articles. Reid Ewing and Robert Cervero. "Travel and the Built Environment: A Meta-Analysis". Journal of the American Planning Association.
- Reid Ewing, Gail Meakins, Shima Hamidi, and Arthur C.Nelson. "Relationship between urban sprawl and physical activity, obesity, and morbidity – Update and refinement". Journal of Health & Place.
- Reid Ewing. "Characteristics, Causes, and Effects of Sprawl: A Literature Review". Journal of Urban Ecology.
- Reid Ewing, and Susan Handy. "Measuring the Unmeasurable: Urban Design Qualities Related to Walkability". Journal of Urban Design.
- Reid Ewing & Fang Rong. "The impact of urban form on U.S. residential energy use". Journal of Housing Policy Debate.
