= Baratunde A. Cola =

American nanotechnologist (born 1981)

- Born: March 17, 1981 (age 45); Detroit, Michigan
- Education: Vanderbilt University; Purdue University
- Awards: 2017 - Alan T. Waterman Award
- Scientific career
- Fields: Materials Science and Mechanical Engineering
- Workplaces: Georgia Institute of Technology

Baratunde A. Cola (born March 17, 1981) is a scientist and engineer specializing in carbon nanotube technology.

== Education ==
Cola was born in Detroit, Michigan but was raised and schooled in Pensacola, Florida. He attended Vanderbilt University where he graduated with a Bachelor of Engineering degree in mechanical engineering in 2002 and a Master of Science in mechanical engineering degree in 2004. While an undergraduate he was also starting fullback for the Vanderbilt Commodores football team.

After Vanderbilt Cola took his PhD, awarded in 2008, in mechanical engineering at Purdue University under the supervision of Dr. Timothy Fisher.

== Research areas ==
Cola was involved in the founding of the NanoEngineered Systems and Transport Lab and Heat Lab at Georgia Institute of Technology, where he is an associate professor in the George W. Woodruff School of Mechanical Engineering and the School of Materials Science and Engineering. For 2015–6 he was a Martin Luther King Jr. visiting professor in the Department of Mechanical Engineering at the Massachusetts Institute of Technology. Specializing in carbon nanotube technology, Cola led the team who demonstrated the first optical rectenna. In addition he is involved in research into the development of thermo-electrochemical cells that produce electricity from waste heat.

Cola was a co-founder of the Academic and Research Leadership Network which supports and provides networking resources minority engineering researchers.

Cola is also the founder of the technology company Carbice Corporation.

== Awards ==
Cola has won a number of awards including the 2011 Presidential Early Career Award for Scientists and Engineers for his work in nanotechnology and also his outreach work with high schools, the 2012 American Association for the Advancement of Science Early Career Award for Public Engagement with Science, 2015 American Society of Mechanical Engineers Bergles-Rohsenow Young Investigator Award in Heat Transfer and most recently the 2017 National Science Foundation Alan T. Waterman Award.
