= Purdue University College of Engineering =

Engineering school of Purdue University

Coordinates: 40°25.86′N 86°54.87′W

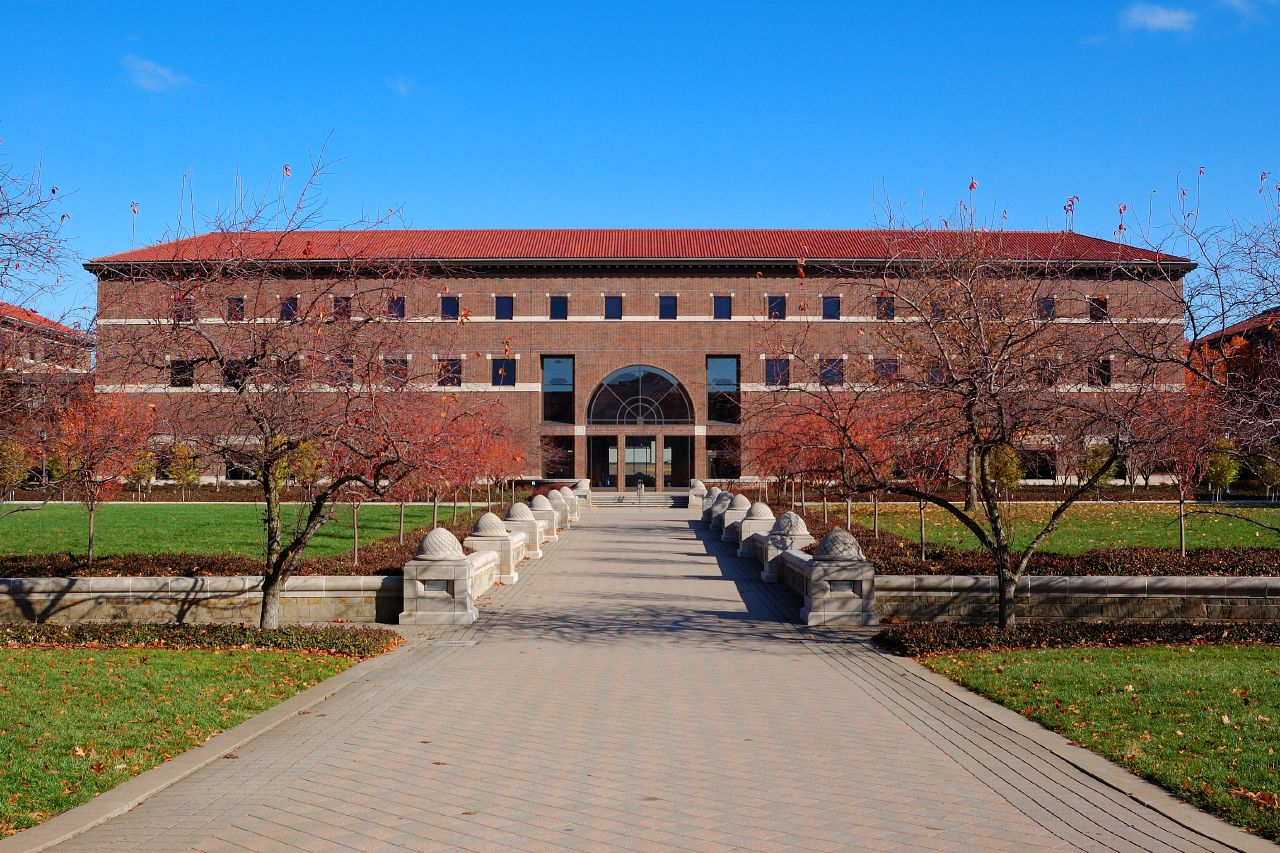
- Material Science and Electrical Engineering Building in 2007
- Type: Public engineering school
- Established: 1874
- Affiliations: Purdue University
- Dean: Arvind Raman
- Faculty: 494 (2023)
- Students: 16,423 (Fall 2023)
- Undergraduates: 11,258 (Fall 2023)
- Postgraduates: 5,165 (Fall 2023)
- Location: (United States) West Lafayette, IN, USA
- Website: engineering.purdue.edu

The Purdue University College of Engineering is the engineering school of Purdue University, located in West Lafayette, Indiana.

Established in 2004, its forerunner began in 1874 with programs in Civil and Mechanical Engineering. The college now offers B.S., M.S., and Ph.D. degrees in more than a dozen disciplines. Purdue's engineering program has also educated 27 of America's astronauts, including Neil Armstrong and Eugene Cernan, who were the first and last astronauts to have walked on the Moon, respectively.

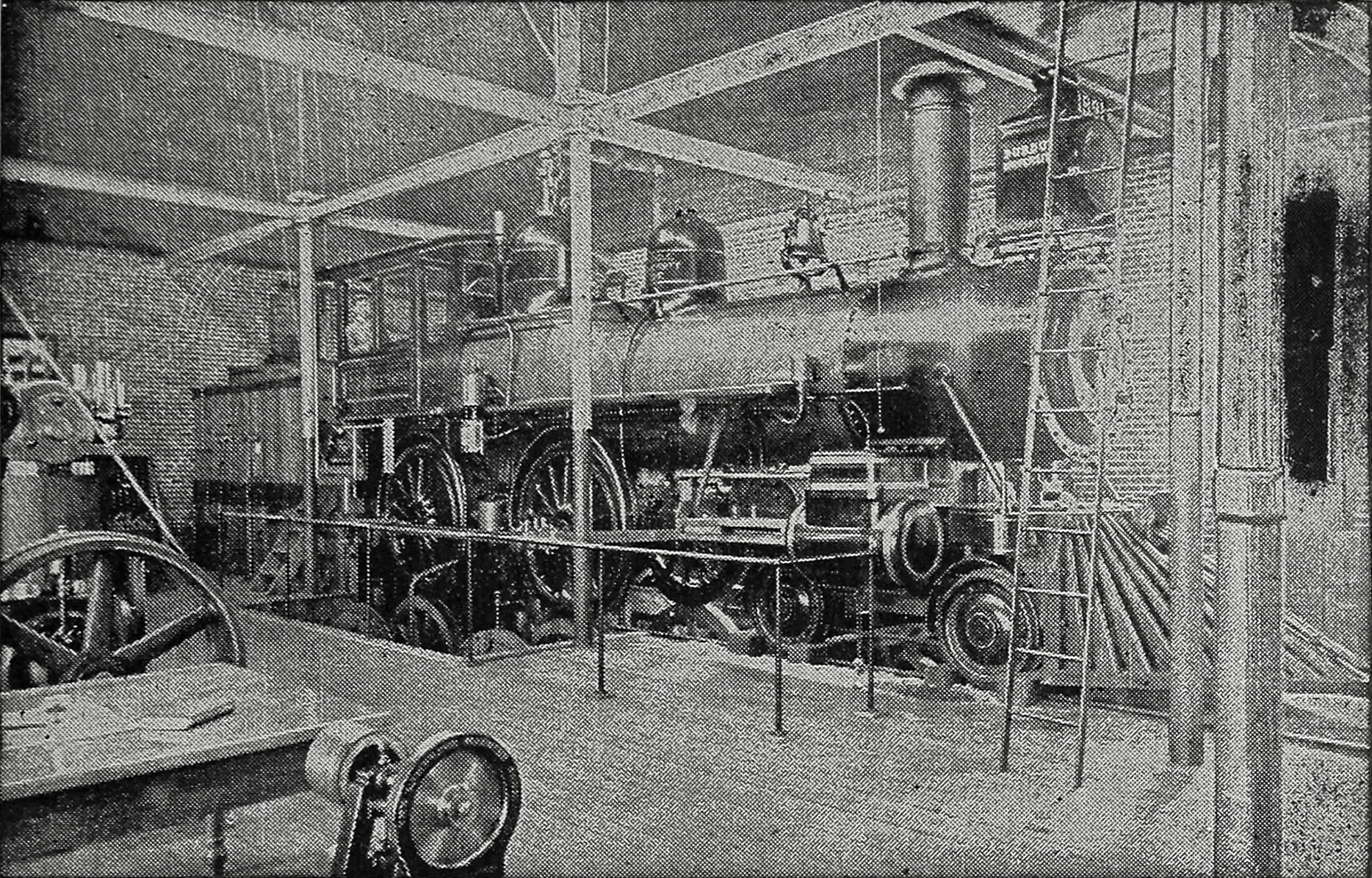
Cassier's Magazine featured the Purdue University in its August 1892 edition. Here is a look at the locomotive testing plant within the Mechanical Laboratory.

== Departments ==
The College of Engineering consists of eleven schools and two divisions.

=== Schools ===
- School of Aeronautics and Astronautics
- School of Agricultural and Biological Engineering
- Weldon School of Biomedical Engineering
- Davidson School of Chemical Engineering
- Lyles School of Civil Engineering
- Elmore Family School of Electrical and Computer Engineering
- School of Engineering Education
- Edwardson School of Industrial Engineering
- School of Materials Engineering
- School of Mechanical Engineering
- School of Nuclear Engineering

=== Divisions ===
- Construction Engineering and Management
- Environmental and Ecological Engineering

== Location ==
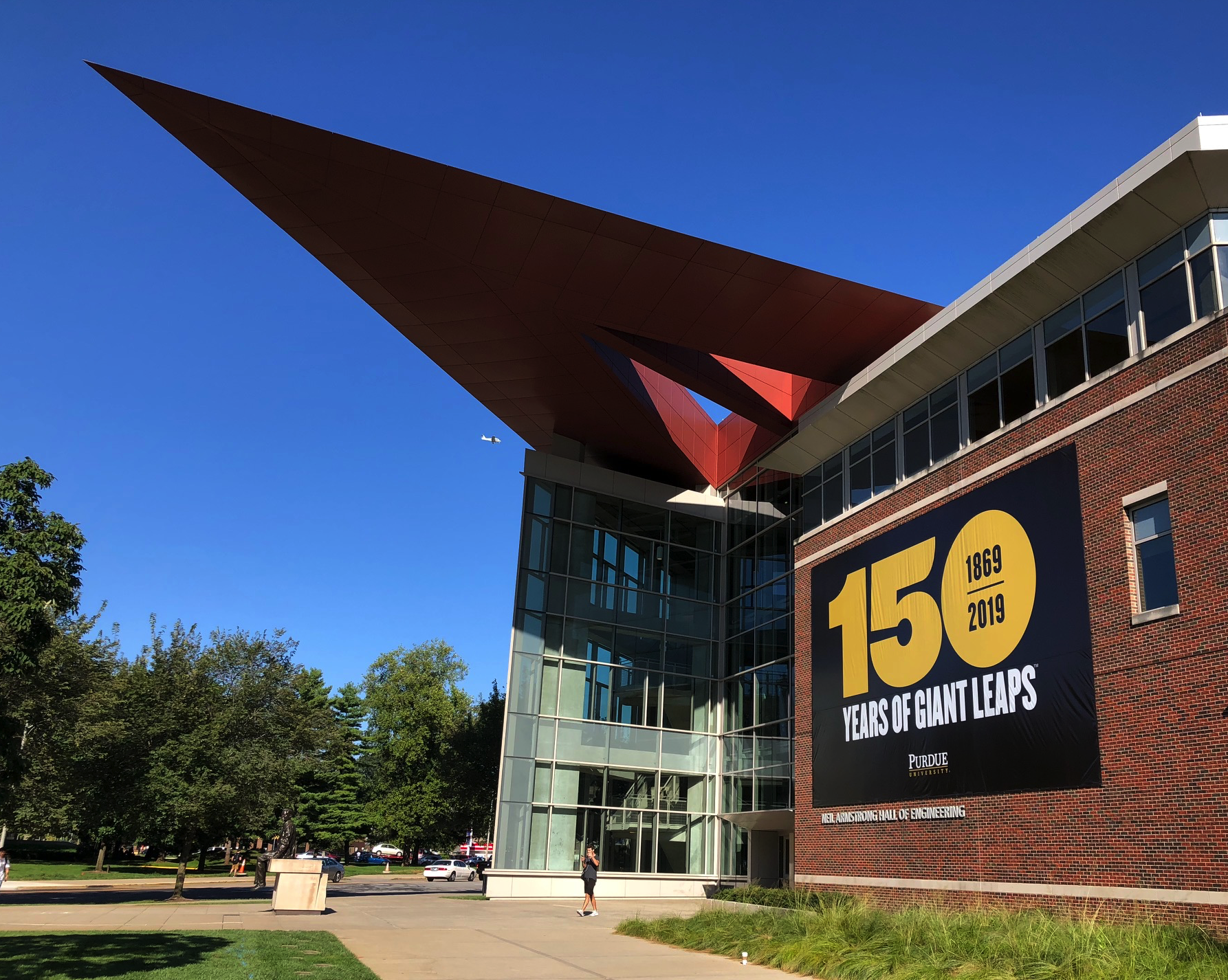
Neil Armstrong Hall of Engineering in 2018

Neil Armstrong Hall of Engineering, named after Purdue alumnus Neil Armstrong, is the flagship of the College of Engineering and home to its administrative offices, the School of Aeronautics and Astronautics, the School of Materials Engineering, Engineering Projects In Community Service (EPICS), Engineering Education, the Minority Engineering Program, and the Women in Engineering Program. Many other campus buildings house faculty offices, classrooms, and laboratories for engineering programs, such as the Martin C. Jischke Hall of Biomedical Engineering, the Forney Hall of Chemical Engineering, and Potter Engineering Center.

== History ==
The Morrill Act, signed by U.S. President Abraham Lincoln in 1862, set the stage for the state of Indiana to establish a college for agriculture and the mechanical arts. In 1874, Purdue established four-year bachelor's degree programs in civil engineering and mechanical engineering. The School of Mechanical Engineering. was created in 1882, although none of Purdue's students at the time were actually qualified to enroll in any of its courses. In 1911, the School of Chemical Engineering was founded, and in 1938 became the School of Chemical and Metallurgical Engineering. The Agricultural Engineering program was established in 1925; it would be renamed the Division of Agricultural and Biological Engineering in 2005. In 1942, the School of Mechanical Engineering was renamed the School of Mechanical and Aeronautical Engineering; the Aeronautical Engineering program would be split out into the School of Aeronautics in 1945 and the School of Aeronautical Engineering in 1953. This was also the year that Purdue established the nation's first Freshmen Engineering program (now First Year Engineering), in which all first-year engineering students take fundamental courses prior to enrolling in the school for their specific discipline. That same year, the Industrial Engineering Department was founded, with some courses taught by Lillian Moller Gilbreth. In 1959, the School of Chemical and Metallurgical Engineering split into two separate units, the latter's segment of which was to be renamed the School of Materials Engineering in 1973.

The 1960s saw the establishment of the Nuclear Engineering and Women in Engineering programs. A 1 kilowatt nuclear reactor has been in operation at the campus since 1962. In 1971, the National Society of Black Engineers was founded on the Purdue campus by two undergraduates. The Construction Engineering and Management Division was created in 1976. In 1989, the Materials and Electrical Engineering Building was completed, providing much-needed space for the growing School of Materials Engineering and School of Electrical Engineering. In 1995, the Engineering Projects In Community Service program was established at Purdue. Three years later, Purdue's Biomedical Engineering program was founded; in 2004, it was expanded into the Weldon School of Biomedical Engineering. That same year, the Department (now School) of Engineering Education, the first of its kind in the nation, was created.

Also in 2004, the College of Engineering was formed as an umbrella organization for the many Schools, Departments, and Divisions of Purdue's engineering programs. Three significant College of Engineering structures would be built over the next few years: the Birck Nanotechnology Center (2005) and the Biomedical Engineering Building (now the Martin C. Jischke Hall of Biomedical Engineering) (2006), both part of Discovery Park); and the Neil Armstrong Hall of Engineering, completed in 2007.

== Rankings ==
The College of Engineering's undergraduate and graduate engineering programs are highly ranked by U.S. News & World Report as some of the best engineering programs in America. Many of Purdue's engineering programs are ranked within the top 10 nationally, resulting in Purdue's College of Engineering coming in 8th for undergraduate programs and 4th for graduate programs in the United States. The 2027 rankings are listed below.

Academic Unit	Undergrad. Rank	Grad. Rank
College of Engineering (overall)	8	4
Aeronautical and Astronautical Engineering	3	5
Agricultural and Biological Engineering	4	1
Biomedical Engineering	23	25
Chemical Engineering	14	14
Civil Engineering	3	7
Computer Engineering	9	9
Electrical Engineering	10	8
Environmental Engineering	10	11
Industrial Engineering	2	4
Materials Engineering	10	11
Mechanical Engineering	8	8
Nuclear Engineering	N/A	10

== Programs ==
Purdue's College of Engineering offers many programs to its students which help young engineers gain real world and international experience. These programs include:

- College of Engineering Honors Program
- First-Year Engineering Program
- Office of Future Engineers
- EPICS (Engineering Projects in Community Service)
- Global Engineering Programs and Partnerships
- Indiana Space Grant Consortium
- Minority Engineering Program
- Professional Practice (Co-op) Program
- Women in Engineering Program
- Innovation and Leadership Studies
