= Patrick J. Loehrer =

American oncologist and cancer center director

- Born: 1952 (age 73–74)
- Education: Purdue University BSME, 1975; Rush Medical College MD, 1978
- Scientific career
- Workplaces: Indiana University School of Medicine
- Website: cancer.iu.edu/research-trials/member-bio.php?id=3029

Patrick J. Loehrer is an American oncologist who is Indiana University Distinguished Professor, Joseph W. and Jackie J. Cusick Professor in Oncology, Professor of medicine, Indiana University School of Medicine; Director emeritus, Indiana University Melvin and Bren Simon Comprehensive Cancer Center.

== Career ==
Along with Lawrence Einhorn, Kenneth Pennington, Rafat Ansari, Prasad Mantravadi, and William B. Fisher, in 1984, he co-founded the Hoosier Oncology Group.

In 2002, he became Director of the Division of Hematology/Oncology at Indiana University School of Medicine.

Loehrer was director of the Indiana University Melvin and Bren Simon Comprehensive Cancer Center from 2010 to 2021. He succeeded Steve Williams who was the founding director of the NCI designated center at the time of its designation in 1999. As Director, Loehrer worked to build the NCI designated cancer center, ultimately leading to NCI designation as a Comprehensive Cancer Center in 2019. He was director until January 2021 when he was succeeded by Kelvin Lee. Loehrer is a member of the Experimental and Developmental Therapeutics Program at the IU Simon Comprehensive Cancer Center.

He founded the Academic Model Providing Access to Healthcare (AMPATH)-Oncology Program, a partnership of North American institutions with Moi University and Moi Teaching and Referral Hospital in Kenya.

More recently, he has hosted the Oncology, Etc., an American Society of Clinical Oncology podcast, with David Johnson.

== Research ==
Loehrer has made notable contributions to research in the care of patients with colorectal cancer, germ cell tumor, pancreatic cancer, bladder cancer, and thymic epithelial tumors.

== Awards and honors ==
- In 2021, he received The Big Ten Cancer Research Consortium Institutional Leadership Award and the inaugural Pat Loehrer Award for Exemplary Collaboration in Cancer Research
- In 2017, he received the Allen S. Lichter Visionary Leader Award and Lecture from the American Society of Clinical Oncology. This award recognizes a recipient who has drastically changed the oncology field or who has made significant contributions to advance the mission of the American Society of Clinical Oncology through the honoree's ability to lead and inspire.
- In 2015, he received the Purdue University College of Engineering 2015 Distinguished Engineering Alumni award "for lifesaving cancer research and achievements demonstrating that Purdue engineering alumni and alumnae can become world-renowned leaders in any field and make highly significant impacts on human lives."
