= Robert McFarland Gates =

American mechanical and consulting engineer (1883-1962)

Robert McFarland Gates (September 7, 1883 – November 7, 1962) was an American mechanical and consulting engineer, and business executive, who served as 63rd president of the American Society of Mechanical Engineers in the year 1944–45.

Gates was born in O'Brien County, Iowa, son of Charles Frederick, an educator, and Minnie Choate (Richardson) Gates. He obtained his BSc in mechanical engineering form Purdue University in 1907.

Gates started his career as consulting engineer in Cleveland, Ohio in 1909. From 1915 to 1918 he was eastern manager at Thew Shovel Corporation, and engineer at the Lakewood Engineering Co. from 1918 to 1921. From 1923 to 1935 he served as vice-president for the Superheater Co., New York, and from 1933 to 1940 as vice-president for the Combustion Engineering Co. In 1940 he was appointed president and director of the Air Preheater Corp, now Lynchburg Air Preheater Corp.

In 1943 Gates was awarded the honorary Dr. in Engineering by the Purdue University.

== Selected publications ==
- Robert M. Gates, From British heritage to American achievement in engineering. A Newcomen address. Princeton University Press, 1944.
