= James J. Shuttleworth =

American businessman (1937 – 2003)

- Born: 1937; Indiana, United States
- Died: 2003 (aged 65–66); Wabash, Indiana
- Education: Purdue University
- Occupation(s): Inventor and entrepreneur
- Known for: Founded Shuttleworth, Inc.

James J. Shuttleworth (1937 – 2003) was an American inventor and entrepreneur who founded Shuttleworth, Inc, a company that manufactures material handling machines including conveyor systems. He was an active business and community leader in Northeastern Indiana.

== Education ==
Shuttleworth was a graduate of Warren High School in 1955. He attended Purdue University and received a Bachelor of Science degree in mechanical engineering in 1960.

== Activities after graduation ==
Shuttleworth returned to his family’s canning and machinery operation. In 1962, he purchased the machinery side of the business and founded the Shuttleworth Machinery Corporation. Serving as engineer, salesman and president, he built the company into a leader in automated material handling systems. The company was renamed Shuttleworth, Inc. in 1974.

Jim learned to fly while still in school and noted that flying played a significant role in growing his company. He restored vintage aircraft, including a 1943 AT-6G Texan and a P-51 Mustang that was once flown by Robin Olds. Shuttleworth also founded the Wings of Freedom Museum in 1996. This collection now resides at the Hoosier Air Museum.

== Death ==
Jim died while piloting a TF-51 Dual Control Mustang near Wabash, Indiana on February 20, 2003.

== Recognition ==
- 1990: Purdue University Distinguished Engineering Alumnus Award
- 1991: Outstanding Mechanical Engineer by the Purdue School of Mechanical Engineering
- 1995: Exporter of the Year - Indiana Business Magazine
- 1997: Northern Indiana Entrepreneur of the Year
- 1998: Honorary degree from Huntington College
