= Timothy S. Fisher =

Timothy S. Fisher (born 1969) is an American educator, engineer and expert in the application of nanotechnologies. He is a former professor of mechanical engineering at the School of Mechanical Engineering, Purdue University and Director, Nanoscale Transport Research Group-Purdue University. He currently teaches at the University of California, Los Angeles. He took his Bachelor of Science and doctorate at Cornell University in 1991 and 1998, respectively. Fisher became the chair of mechanical and aerospace engineering department at University of California, Los Angeles, starting July 1, 2018.

== Expertise ==
Fisher studies the impacts of nanotechnology development and its implications for energy conversions and efficiency. His own, individual academic work concentrates on nanoscale energy transport and conversion, synthesis of nanomaterials, cooling of microelectronics and microfluids. The group he directs also studies the transport and conversion of energy carried by electrons, phonons, and photons. Research focus includes applications in clean energy (e.g., direct energy conversion, hydrogen storage) and major industrial segments (e.g., micro/nanoelectronics, sensors).

Fisher is known for the Fisher Query in nanotechnology development, namely, “. . . before we can even think about using nanotubes in electronics, we have to learn how to put them where we want them.”

== Inventor ==
Fisher was a member of the Purdue University engineering research team which developed a biosensor for detecting blood glucose and other biological molecules using hollow structures called single-wall carbon nanotubes anchored to gold-coated "nanocubes." The device resembled a cube-shaped tetherball. Each tetherball is a sensor. A nanotube anchors each tetherball to electronic circuitry which acts as both a tether and ultrathin wire to conduct electrical signals.

== Sample Publications ==
- X.R. Zhang, T.S. Fisher, A. Raman, T.D. Sands, “Linear coefficient of thermal expansion of porous anodic alumina thin films from atomic force microscopy,” Nanoscale and Microscale Thermophysical Engineering, vol. 13, pp. 243–252, 2009.
- V. Khanikar, I. Mudawar, T.S. Fisher, “Flow boiling in a micro-channel coated with carbon nanotubes,” IEEE Transactions on Components and Packaging Technologies, vol. 32, pp. 639–649, 2009.
- K. Uppireddi, T.L. Westover, T.S. Fisher, B.R. Weiner, G. Morell, “Thermionic emission energy distribution from nanocrystalline diamond films for direct thermal-electrical energy conversion applications,” Journal of Applied Physics, Vol. 106, art. no. 043716, 2009.
- V. Khanikar, I. Mudawar, T.S. Fisher, “Effects of carbon nanotube coating on flow boiling in a micro-channel,” International Journal of Heat and Mass Transfer, Vol. 52, pp. 3805–3817, 2009.
- B.A. Cola, J. Xu, T.S. Fisher, “Contact mechanics and thermal conductance of carbon nanotube array interfaces,” International Journal of Heat and Mass Transfer, Vol. 52, pp. 3490–3503, 2009.
- D.B. Go, T.S. Fisher, S.V. Garimella, V. Bahadur, “Planar microscale ionization devices in atmospheric air with diamond-based electrodes,” Plasma Sources Science & Technology, Vol. 18, art. no. 035004, 2009.
- D.B. Go, T.S. Fisher, S.V. Garimella, “Direct simulation of ionization and ion transport for planar microscale ion generation devices,” Journal of Physics D: Applied Physics, Vol. 42, art. no. 055203, 2009.
- B.A. Cola, T.S. Fisher, X.F. Xu, “Carbon nanotube array thermal interfaces,” Ch. 6 (pp. 101–118) in Carbon Nanotubes: New Research, ed. A. P. Ottenhouse, Nova Science Publishers, 2009.

== Association ==
Fisher joined the Phi Kappa Psi fraternity at Cornell University, and through that organization, the Irving Literary Society.
