= Brent W. Webb =

American professor (born 1956)

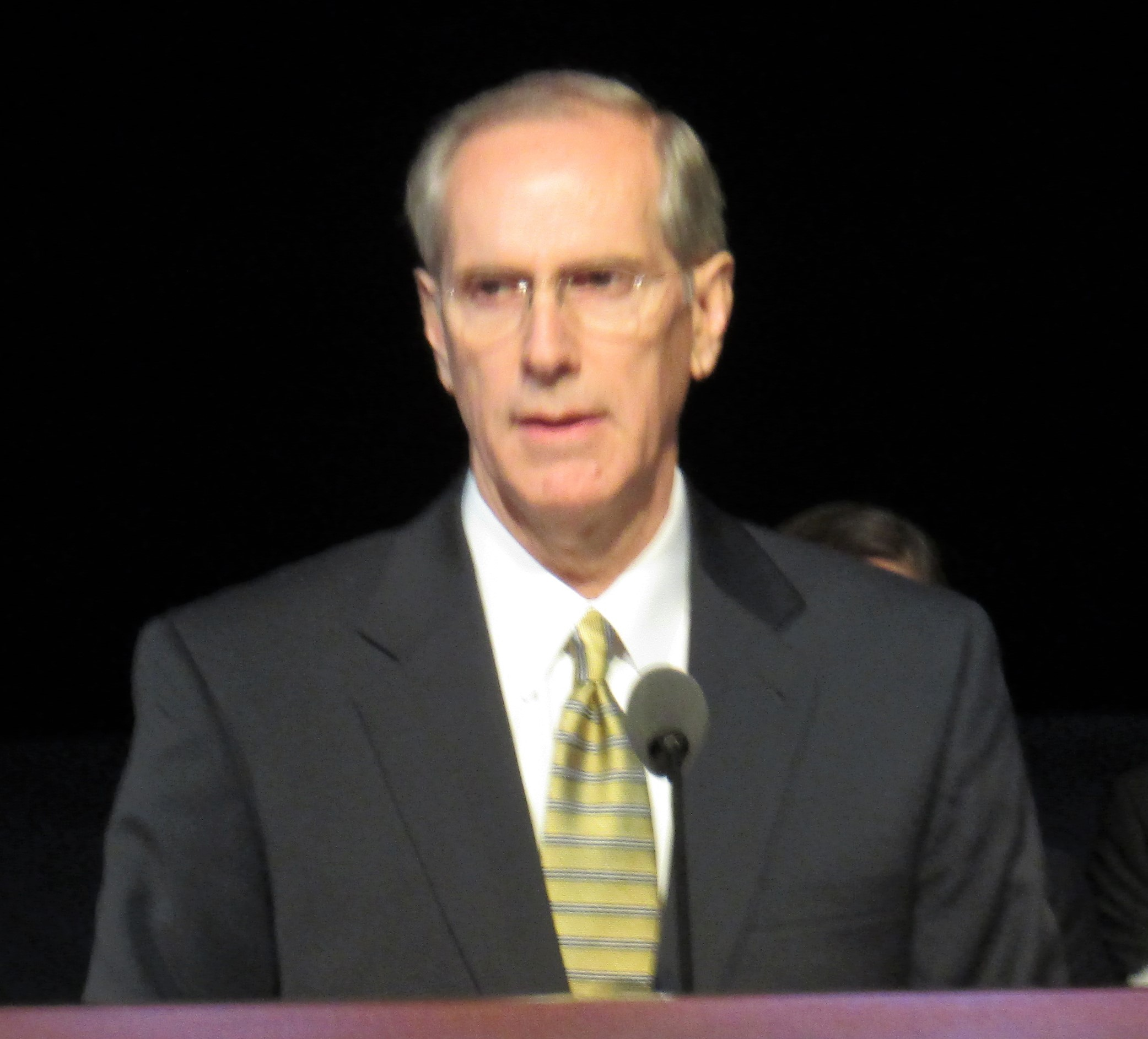
Brent W. Webb in 2017.

Brent Woodruff Webb (born August 26, 1956) is an American professor of mechanical engineering at Brigham Young University (BYU). From 2011 to 2017, he served as BYU's Academic Vice President.

Webb earned bachelor's and master's degrees from BYU in mechanical engineering and a Ph.D. from Purdue University in the same field. While at Purdue, he was designated the National Science Foundation Presidential Young Investigator.

== Biography ==
Webb specializes in heat transfer and other thermodynamics topics. Software he developed to model complex heat transfer in glass has been used in industrial production in the United States and Japan.

From 1996 to 1999, Webb served as the executive director of BYU's Office of Research and Creative Activities.

On February 1, 2011, Webb was named BYU's Academic Vice President, replacing John S. Tanner. He had previously served as an associate academic vice president and was succeeded by Alan Harker. He served in this position until June 2017, when he was replaced by James R. Rasband.

Webb is a member of the Church of Jesus Christ of Latter-day Saints (LDS Church). Among other positions in the LDS Church, Webb served as president of a church stake in Orem. He is married to Amy Jo Barker. They have six children.

== Publications ==
- "Development of an advanced one-dimensional stem heating model for application in surface fires" in Canadian Journal of Forest Studies with Joshua L. Jones (lead author), Dan Jimenez, James Reardon and Bret Butler.
- "SLW modeling of radiative transfer in multicomponent gas mixtures" in Journal of Quantitiative Spectroscopy and Radiative Transfer vol. 65 (2000) Issue 4. with Vladimir P. Solovjov.
- "An Efficient Method for Modeling Radiative Transfer in Multicomponent Gas Mixtures With Soot" in Journal of Heat Transfer Vol. 123, Issue 3 (June 2001) with Solovjov.
