= Karthik Ramani =

- Born: India
- Citizenship: American
- Education: Stanford University
- Awards: Donald W. Feddersen Distinguished Professor of Mechanical Engineering, ASME Fellow (2010)
- Scientific career
- Fields: Mechanical Engineering and Computer Vision
- Workplaces: Purdue University

Karthik Ramani is an Indian born American researcher, mechanical engineer, and entrepreneur. He is the Donald W. Feddersen Distinguished Professor of Mechanical Engineering at Purdue University, with courtesy appointments in Electrical and Computer Engineering and Educational Studies in the College of Education. Previously, from 2001-2008, he was the Director of the Center for Information Sciences in Engineering at Purdue University.

== Education and career ==
Karthik Ramani received his Bachelor of Technology from the Indian Institute of Technology, Madras in 1985, M.S. in mechanical engineering from Ohio State University in 1987, and Ph.D. in mechanical engineering from Stanford University in 1991.

He became an assistant professor at Purdue University’s School of Mechanical Engineering in 1991, an associate professor in 1997, a professor in 2001, the Donald W. Feddersen Professor of Mechanical Engineering in 2010, and appointed as a distinguished professor in 2020.

== Research ==
Ramani is best known for his work on computer vision, human-computer interaction, and computational fabrication.

His research areas include design, manufacturing and materials processing, robotics, and computational engineering with interests in human skill and augmentation, collaborative and hybridized intelligence, deep learning of shapes and computer vision, human-robot-machine interactions, making to manufacturing (M2M), factory of the future and robotics, and manufacturing productivity.

Ramani's papers titled Three-dimensional shape searching: state-of-the-art review and future trends (2005) and On visual similarity based 2D drawing retrieval (2006), along with subsequent patents, led to the formation of VizSeek (formerly Imaginestics), the world’s first commercial shape-based search engine.

For his work at VizSeek, Ramani was awarded the Outstanding Commercialization Award for Purdue University Faculty in 2009.

=== Most cited works ===
As of February 12, 2020 Ramani's three most cited works (according to Google Scholar), in decreasing order of citations were:

1. The status, challenges, and future of additive manufacturing in engineering (2015)
2. Three-dimensional shape searching: state-of-the-art review and future trends (2005)
3. The evolution, challenges, and future of knowledge representation in product design systems (2013)

== Awards ==
In 2020, Ramani was appointed as Distinguished Professor of Mechanical Engineering at Purdue University

He has also received other awards and honors in research, education, and innovation, including:

- Best of Consumer Electronics Show Finalist (2016) and the TiE50 Silicon Valley award (2018) for ZeroUI's Ziro
- Highly Cited Author Award, Elsevier Computer-Aided Design Journal (2015)
- Research Excellence Award, American Society of Mechanical Engineers (Computers and Information in Engineering Division) (2014)
- Kos Ishii Toshiba Award, ASME (2013)
- ASME Fellow (2010)
- Tibbetts Award from the Small Business Technology Council for VizSeek/Imaginestics (2007)
- Innovation of the Year Award Finalist, Techpoint Mira Awards (2006)
- Outstanding Young Manufacturing Engineer, Society of Manufacturing Engineers (1999)
- Ralph R. Teetor Educational Award, Society of Automotive Engineers (1996)
