= Frank P. Incropera =

Mechanical engineering professor (born 1939)

Frank P. Incropera (/ɪŋ.kroʊˈpɛr.ə/; born 12 May 1939) is an American mechanical engineer and author on the subjects of mass and heat transfer. Incropera is the Clifford and Evelyn Brosey Professor of Mechanical Engineering at the University of Notre Dame, Indiana, US. A Fellow of American Society of Mechanical Engineers, Incropera is known for his contributions to the field of heat transfer, especially in the context of radiation transfer in scattering-absorbing media and double diffusive convection.

== Education and career ==
Born in Lawrence, Massachusetts in United States on 12 May 1939, Incropera received his bachelor's degree mechanical engineering from the Massachusetts Institute of Technology in 1961 and M.S. degree in mechanical engineering from the Stanford University in 1962. From 1962 to 1964 he has worked for the Lockheed Missiles & Space Company, Sunnyvale, California. He came back to Stanford and earned his Ph.D. degree in mechanical engineering in 1966. Incropera began his academic career in 1966 as an assistant professor in Mechanical Engineering department at Purdue University. In 1969, he was promoted to associate professor and became full professor in 1973. He was chairman of the Heat and Mass Transfer Area of Mechanical Engineering from 1976 to 1985. Incropera also served as Head of the School of Mechanical Engineering from 1989 to 1998. In 1998, he left Purdue to join University of Notre Dame as the Clifford and Evelyn Brosey Professor of Mechanical Engineering. At the University of Notre Dame, he also served as Matthew H. McCloskey Dean of Engineering until 2006.

== Recognition ==
Incropera has been listed as an ISI Highly Cited Author in Engineering by the ISI Web of Knowledge - Thomson Scientific Company, and a Highly Ranked Scholar by ScholarGPS.

Incropera was elected a member of the National Academy of Engineering in 1996 for research on the science and practice of heat transfer and for contributions to engineering education.
