= Rajala =

Rajala is a Finnish and Telugu (Telugu: రాజల) surname. Notable people with the surname include:

- Anders Rajala (1891–1957), Finnish wrestler
- Howard Rajala (born 1962), Canadian curler
- Jukka Rajala (born 1982), Finnish alpine skier
- Juuso Rajala (born 1988), Finnish ice hockey player
- Lembit Rajala (born 1970), Estonian football striker
- Sameli Rajala (1858–1948), Finnish farmer, lay preacher and politician
- Sarah Rajala, American engineer
- Toni Rajala (born 1991), Finnish ice hockey forward
- Ville Rajala (born 1989), Finnish ice hockey player
