= Fentiman =

Fentiman is a surname. Notable people with the surname include:

- Alfred Fentiman (1867–1943), British sportsman
- Audeen W. Fentiman (fl. 1990–2012), American engineer
- Brian Fentiman (1947–2019), British lightweight rower
- Michael Fentiman (born 1982), British theatre director
- Shannon Fentiman (born 1983/1984), Australian politician

== See also ==
- Fentimans, brewery in England
