= List of Omega Chi Epsilon chapters =

Omega Chi Epsilon is an American honor society for chemical engineering. Following is a list of chapters of Omega Chi Epsilon. Active chapters noted in bold. Inactive chapters and any dormant institutions are in italics.

Chapter	Charter date and range	Institution	City	State or country	Status	Ref.
Alpha	1931–1936; 19xx ?	University of Illinois Urbana-Champaign	Champaign–Urbana	Illinois	Active	
Beta	1932–1938; 1966	Iowa State University	Ames	Iowa	Active	
Gamma	1934–1938; 19xx ?	University of Minnesota	Minneapolis	Minnesota	Active	
Delta	1941	Clarkson University	Potsdam	New York	Active	
Epsilon	1941	University of Texas at Austin	Austin	Texas	Active	
Zeta	1943	Purdue University	West Lafayette	Indiana	Active	
Eta	1957	New Jersey Institute of Technology	Newark	New Jersey	Active	
Theta	1958	West Virginia University	Morgantown	West Virginia	Active	
Iota	1959	University of Pittsburgh	Pittsburgh	Pennsylvania	Active	
Kappa	1960	New York University Tandon School of Engineering	Brooklyn	New York	Active	(Note: This chapter was organized at the school while it operated under a previous name, New York Tech.)
Lambda	1964	City University of New York	Manhattan	New York	Active	
Mu	1964	Oklahoma State University–Stillwater	Stillwater	Oklahoma	Active	
Nu	1965	University of Detroit Mercy	Detroit	Michigan	Active	
Xi	1965	Northeastern University	Boston	Massachusetts	Active	
Omicron	1967	Lamar University	Beaumont	Texas	Active	
Pi	1969	Rose–Hulman Institute of Technology	Terre Haute	Indiana	Active	
Rho	1970	Texas A&M University	College Station	Texas	Active	
Sigma	1970	University of Arkansas	Fayetteville	Arkansas	Active	
Tau	1971	University of Alabama	Tuscaloosa	Alabama	Active	
Upsilon	1971	University of Kentucky	Lexington	Kentucky	Active	
Phi	1971	Louisiana Tech University	Ruston	Louisiana	Active	
Chi	1973	University of Maryland, College Park	College Park	Maryland	Active	
Psi	1974	University of Southern California	Los Angeles	California	Active	
Omega	May 2, 1974	Missouri University of Science and Technology	Rolla	Missouri	Active	
Alpha Alpha	1975	Auburn University	Auburn	Alabama	Active	
Alpha Beta	1975	Northwestern University	Evanston	Illinois	Active	
Alpha Gamma	1975	University of Massachusetts Lowell	Lowell	Massachusetts	Active	
Alpha Delta	1975	University of Houston	Houston	Texas	Active	
Alpha Epsilon	1976	Kansas State University	Manhattan	Kansas	Active	
Alpha Zeta	1977	Michigan State University	East Lansing	Michigan	Active	
Alpha Eta	1978	Mississippi State University	Starkville	Mississippi	Active	
Alpha Theta	1978	Youngstown State University	Youngstown	Ohio	Active	
Alpha Iota	1978	Tulane University	New Orleans	Louisiana	Active	
Alpha Kappa	1979	University of South Carolina	Columbia	South Carolina	Active	
Alpha Lambda	1979	University of Louisiana at Lafayette	Lafayette	Louisiana	Active	
Alpha Mu	1979	New Mexico State University	Las Cruces	New Mexico	Active	
Alpha Nu	1980	Trine University	Angola	Indiana	Active	
Alpha Xi	1980	University of Colorado Boulder	Boulder	Colorado	Active	
Alpha Omicron	1981	Texas Tech University	Lubbock	Texas	Active	
Alpha Pi	1982	Howard University	Washington	District of Columbia	Active	
Alpha Rho	1983	Georgia Tech	Atlanta	Georgia	Active	
Alpha Sigma	1983	University of Connecticut	Storrs	Connecticut	Active	
Alpha Tau	1984	Colorado State University	Fort Collins	Colorado	Active	
Alpha Upsilon	1984	California State Polytechnic University, Pomona	Pomona	California	Active	
Alpha Phi	1984	University of Iowa	Iowa City	Iowa	Active	
Alpha Chi	1984	Virginia Tech	Blacksburg	Virginia	Active	
Alpha Psi	1985	Manhattan College	The Bronx	New York	Active	
Alpha Omega	1988	Louisiana State University	Baton Rouge	Louisiana	Active	
Beta Alpha	1988	Pennsylvania State University	University Park	Pennsylvania	Active	
Beta Beta		University of Missouri	Columbia	Missouri	Active	
Beta Gamma		North Carolina A&T State University	Greensboro	North Carolina	Active	
Beta Delta		Tuskegee University	Tuskegee	Alabama	Active	
Beta Epsilon		University of Cincinnati	Cincinnati	Ohio	Active	
Beta Zeta		University of Minnesota Duluth	Duluth	Minnesota	Active	
Beta Eta		Texas A&M University–Kingsville	Kingsville	Texas	Active	
Beta Theta		University of Michigan	Ann Arbor	Michigan	Active	
Beta Iota		Prairie View A&M University	Prairie View	Texas	Active	
Beta Kappa		University of South Florida	Tampa	Florida	Active	
Beta Lambda		Washington University in St. Louis	St. Louis	Missouri	Active	
Beta Mu		Widener University	Chester	Pennsylvania	Active	
Beta Nu		University of Toledo	Toledo	Ohio	Active	
Beta Xi		University of California, Irvine	Irvine	California	Active	
Beta Omicron		North Carolina State University	Raleigh	North Carolina	Active	
Beta Pi		University of Delaware	Newark	Delaware	Active	
Beta Rho	November 4, 1999-May 2019; 2024-	Tennessee Tech	Cookeville	Tennessee	Active	
Beta Sigma	April 4, 2000	Rutgers University–New Brunswick	Piscataway	New Jersey	Active	(Note: The chapter was established as a colony in 1997.)
Beta Tau	200x ?	Michigan Technological University	Houghton	Michigan	Active	
Beta Upsilon	200x ?	Ohio University	Athens	Ohio	Active	
Beta Phi	200x ?	University of Alabama in Huntsville	Huntsville	Alabama	Active	
Beta Chi	200x ?	University of Arizona	Tucson	Arizona	Active	
Beta Psi	20xx ?	University of Tulsa	Tulsa	Oklahoma	Active	
Beta Omega	2003	Rensselaer Polytechnic Institute	Troy	New York	Active	
Gamma Alpha	20xx ?	Worcester Polytechnic Institute	Worcester	Massachusetts	Active	
Gamma Beta	2009–20xx ?; 2018	Hampton University	Hampton	Virginia	Active	
Gamma Gamma	20xx ?	University of Virginia	Charlottesville	Virginia	Active	
Gamma Delta	April 12, 2012	Texas A&M University at Qatar	Education City, Al Rayyan	Qatar	Active	
Gamma Epsilon	20xx ?	Cooper Union	New York City	New York	Active	
Gamma Zeta	20xx ?	Stevens Institute of Technology	Hoboken	New Jersey	Active	
Gamma Eta	20xx ?	University of South Alabama	Mobile	Alabama	Active	
Gamma Theta	20xx ?	University of Dayton	Dayton	Ohio	Active	
Gamma Iota	20xx ?	Columbia University	New York City	New York	Active	
Gamma Kappa	20xx ?	American University of Sharjah	Sharjah	United Arab Emirates	Active	
