= Leah Jamieson =

American engineer (born 1949)

- Born: August 27, 1949 (age 77); Trenton, New Jersey, U.S.
- Education: Massachusetts Institute of Technology; Princeton University
- Awards: Bernard M. Gordon Prize for Innovation in Engineering and Technology (2005); Chester F. Carlson Award for Innovation in Engineering Education, (ASEE,1997); Anita Borg Institute Women of Vision Award for Social Impact (2007); IEEE Fellow (1993); IEEE Third Millennium Medal (2000)
- Scientific career
- Fields: Signal processing
- Workplaces: Purdue University
- Doctoral advisor: Kenneth Steiglitz

Leah H. Jamieson (born August 27, 1949) is an American engineering educator, currently the Ransburg Distinguished Professor of Electrical and Computer Engineering at Purdue University. Jamieson was a co-founder of the Engineering Projects in Community Service program (EPICS), a multi-university engineering design program that operates in a service-learning context. She is a recipient of the Gordon Prize. From 2006-2017, she served as the John A. Edwardson Dean of Engineering at Purdue.

Jamieson was elected a member of the US National Academy of Engineering in 2005 for innovations in integrating engineering education and community service. She served as the 2007 President and CEO of the Institute of Electrical and Electronics Engineers (IEEE).

== Biography ==
Jamieson was born in 1949 and grew up in New Jersey. She received the B.S. degree in mathematics in 1972 from the Massachusetts Institute of Technology (MIT). She received M.A. and M.S.E. degrees in 1974 and a Ph.D. in 1977, all three from Princeton University.

Jamieson has worked as Professor of Engineering at Purdue University since 1976. Her research interests include speech analysis and recognition; the design and analysis of parallel processing algorithms; and the application of parallel processing to the areas of digital speech, image, and signal processing. She has authored over 200 journal and conference papers in these areas and has co-edited books on algorithmically specialized parallel computers (Academic Press, 1985) and the characteristics of parallel algorithms (MIT Press, 1987). She served Purdue as Director of the Graduate Program in Electrical Engineering (1990–94), Director of Graduate Admissions (1994–96), Interim Head of the School of Electrical and Computer Engineering (2002), and Associate Dean of Engineering for Undergraduate Education (2004–06). She is currently the Ransburg Distinguished Professor of Electrical and Computer Engineering at Purdue University and holds a courtesy appointment in Purdue's School of Engineering Education. From 2006-2017, she served as the John A. Edwardson Dean of Engineering at Purdue.

== Engineering Projects in Community Service ==
In Fall 1995 Jamieson and her Purdue colleague Edward J. Coyle founded Engineering Projects in Community Service, an academic engineering design program that operates in a service-learning context. The program, which was initially offered only at Purdue, is available at present in 18 universities. It offers students from multiple disciplines with the opportunity to be part of engineering project design teams that work with nonprofit community organizations. The teams provide technological solutions to challenges faced by the community organizations and their target audiences. Examples of EPICS projects include the Spanish In Action Project at Butler University, which provides students with a web-based computer game that helps them learn Spanish vocabulary; and the Sensor Network Air Pollution Monitoring project at Drexel University that allows measurement of diesel particulate concentration in Philadelphia's neighborhoods. For founding and administering EPICS, Jamieson has received in 2005 the Bernard M. Gordon Prize for Innovation in Engineering and Technology (with colleagues Edward J. Coyle and William C. Oakes). In 2008 the EPICS program has announced EPICS High, an extension of the program's scope to integrate high school students in the design teams.

== Presidency of IEEE ==
In November 2005 Jamieson was elected 2006 President-elect by members of the Institute of Electrical and Electronics Engineers (IEEE). IEEE the world's largest technical professional society, focused on electrical engineering, computer engineering, computer science and the related arts and sciences. The other candidates in the 2005 elections were Gerald Peterson and James M. Tien.

Jamieson served as president and CEO of IEEE in 2007. Her presidency was characterized by a strong effort to redefine and expand the strategic planning process within IEEE, and to start an IEEE public visibility program. Other notable developments during her presidency included expansion of IEEE's pre-university engineering education programs and reorganization of the IEEE Regional Activities Board (renamed Member and Geographical Activities Board).

== Publications ==
- 1985, Algorithmically Specialized Parallel Computers (1985, Academic Press, ISBN 0-12-654130-2), Editor, with Lawrence Snyder, Dennis B. Gannon and Howard Jay Siegel.
- 1987, The Characteristics of Parallel Algorithms (1987, MIT Press, ISBN 978-0-262-10036-6), Editor, with Dennis B. Gannon and Robert J. Douglass.
