= Electrokinetics =

Electrokinetics or electrokinetic may refer to:

- Electrohydrodynamics, the study of the dynamics of electrically charged fluids
- Electrokinetic phenomena, a family of several different effects that occur in heterogeneous fluids
- Zeta potential, a scientific term for electrokinetic potential
- Electrokinetic remediation, a technique of using direct electrical current to remove particles from the soil
- Electro-kinetic road ramp, a method of generating electricity
- Micellar electrokinetic chromatography, a chromatography technique used in analytical chemistry
- Elektrokinesis, a purported psychic ability to manipulate electricity; see List of psychic abilities
