= Vanderbilt University Graduate School =

Coordinates: 36.148289°N 86.802697°W

- Type: Private
- Established: 1873
- Dean: Mark Wallace
- Postgraduates: 2,202
- Location: Nashville, TN, USA

The Graduate School manages many of the advanced degree programs of Vanderbilt University, a major research university located in Nashville, Tennessee. While the Graduate School exists as a standalone institution within Vanderbilt, it awards degrees in conjunction with Vanderbilt's other constituent colleges (e.g., the College of Arts and Science or the School of Engineering).

== History ==
Since its founding in 1873, Vanderbilt has offered "work in the liberal arts and sciences beyond the baccalaureate degree", and the university awarded its first graduate degrees (master's degrees in Greek, Latin, and English and a doctorate in chemistry) in 1879. The Graduate School now claims some 19,000 alumni.
