= Adrienne Minerick =

American chemical engineer

Adrienne Robyn Minerick is an American chemical engineer and academic administrator who researches electrokinetics in microdevices, medical diagnostics, and nonlinear electrophoresis.

== Life ==
Minerick earned a B.S. in chemical engineering from Michigan Technological University. She completed a M.S. and Ph.D. in chemical and biomolecular engineering from the University of Notre Dame. Her 2003 dissertation was titled, Medical Diagnostic Microfluidics and Physiological Blood Flow Dynamics. Hsueh-Chia Chang was her doctoral advisor. In 2007, Minerick received a National Science Foundation CAREER Award.

From 2018 to 2021, Minerick served as Dean of the School of Technology and later the School of Computing in the College of Engineering at the Michigan Technological University from 2018 to 2021. She is a professor of Chemical Engineering. She was president of the American Society for Engineering Education from 2021 to 2022. She is a past president of the American Electrophoresis Society and a fellow of the American Association for the Advancement of Science and the American Institute of Chemical Engineers.
