= Stephanie Farrell =

Stephanie H. Farrell
- Education: University of Pennsylvania (BS); Stevens Institute of Technology (MS); New Jersey Institute of Technology (PhD)
- Occupations: Chemical engineer, academic administrator
- Employer: Rowan University
- Organizations: American Society for Engineering Education; American Institute of Chemical Engineers; International Federation of Engineering Education Societies
- Known for: Engineering education

Stephanie H. Farrell (born 1964) is an American chemical engineer and academic administrator who is the founding department head of experimental engineering education at the Rowan University.

== Education ==
Farrell earned a B.S. in chemical engineering from the University of Pennsylvania in 1986. She completed a M.S. in chemical engineering from Stevens Institute of Technology in 1992. She received a Ph.D. in chemical engineering from the New Jersey Institute of Technology in 1996. Her dissertation was titled, A Controlled Release Technique Using Microporous Membranes. Kamalesh Sirkar was Farrell's doctoral advisor.

== Career ==
From 1996 to 1998, Farrell served as a faculty member at Louisiana Tech University. Farrell joined the Henry M. Rowan College of Engineering in 1998 where she worked in the department of chemical engineering until 2017.

She was the interim dean of the Henry M. Rowan College of Engineering from 2019 to 2021. Farrell was president of the American Society for Engineering Education (ASEE) from 2017 to 2019 and the International Federation of Engineering Education Societies from 2022 to 2024. She was elected a fellow of the ASEE and American Institute of Chemical Engineers in 2015 and 2021 respectively.
