= Jim Pfaendtner =

American chemical engineer

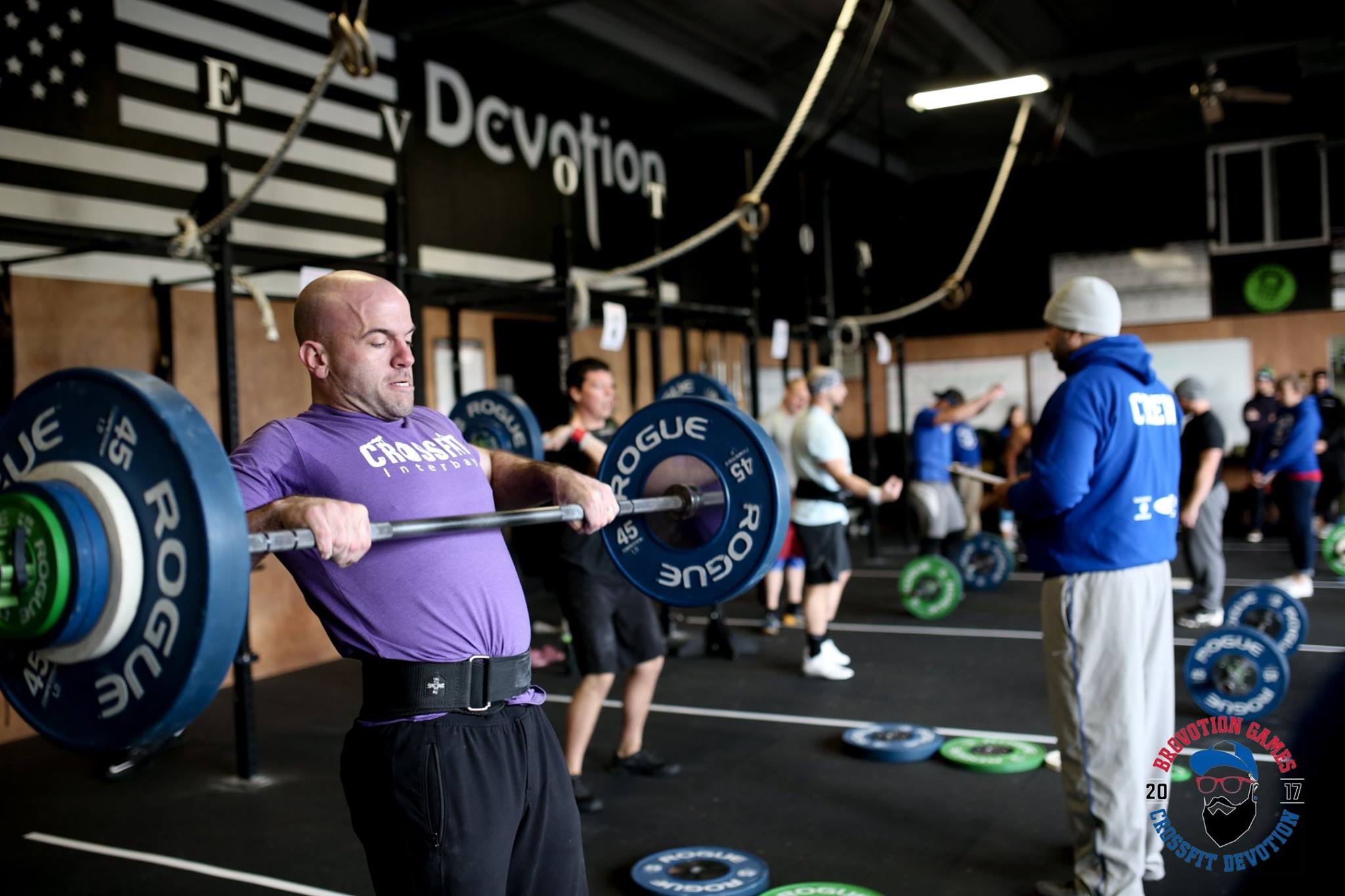
- Born: Detroit, Michigan, US
- Education: Northwestern University; Georgia Tech
- Known for: Peptide Adsorption; Molecular Design; Chemical Reaction Engineering; Nanotechnology
- Scientific career
- Fields: Chemical Engineering; Chemistry; Computational Molecular Science; Data Science
- Workplaces: University of Washington
- Thesis: Mechanistic Modeling of Hydrocarbon Autoxidation: Theory and Application to the Study of Lubricant Degradation
- Doctoral advisor: Linda Broadbelt

Jim Pfaendtner is an American chemical engineer. He was named Provost at North Carolina State University in Raleigh, North Carolina after serving as the Louis Martin-Vega Dean of Engineering. With more than 12,500 students, 750 faculty and staff members and more than $290M in annual research expenditures, NC State’s College of Engineering is internationally recognized for the excellence of its research, education and outreach programs. Pfaendtner was the 10th permanent dean to lead the College of Engineering. Before joining NC State, he was the Steve and Connie Rogel Professor and chair of chemical engineering and professor of chemistry at the University of Washington. He additionally served as the associate vice provost for research computing. Pfaendtner was a staff scientist at the Pacific Northwest National Laboratory. Since August 1, 2023, Pfaendtner has been the Louis Martin-Vega Dean of the College of Engineering at North Carolina State University. On May 11, 2026, Pfaendtner will become executive vice chancellor and provost of North Carolina State University.

== Background and education ==
Pfaendtner grew up in Grand Rapids, Michigan and graduated from Forest Hills Central High School. He completed his B.S. in chemical engineering from Georgia Institute of Technology in 2001 and obtained a Ph.D. in chemical engineering from Northwestern University in 2007 under the direction of Linda Broadbelt. Pfaendtner was awarded an International Research Fellowship from the National Science Foundation in 2007 and completed postdoctoral research with Greg Voth and Michele Parrinello from 2007–2009.

== Academic career ==
In 2009 Pfaendtner began his faculty career at University of Washington as an assistant professor of chemical engineering.

In 2012 he was the recipient of a National Science Foundation CAREER award and in 2013 the University of Washington Distinguished Teaching Award.

In 2014, Pfaendtner was selected as one of "20 Under 40" faculty members by the publication "Prism" of the ASEE.

Pfaendtner has been an active member of the AIChE Computational Molecular Science and Engineering Forum CoMSEF for over 10 years.

In 2018 he was appointed as the University of Washington associate vice provost for research computing, and in 2019 department chair of chemical engineering.

In 2020, Pfaendtner received a joint appointment as professor of chemistry.

In 2022, he was elected to the Washington State Academy of Sciences, and he was awarded the AIChE CoMSEF Impact Award by the American Institute of Chemical Engineers.

In 2023, Pfaendtner was appointed as the Louis Martin-Vega Dean of the college of engineering at North Carolina State University.

In 2026, Pfaendtner was selected to become NC State's executive vice chancellor and provost, effective May 11, 2026, succeeding in the role as the university's chief academic officer.

== Research interests ==
Research in the Pfaendtner group focuses on the development and use of tools of computational molecular science to aid in analysis and design of new molecules and materials. Current areas of interest include molecular data science, biomolecular simulations, reaction networks and biomimetic materials. The group is particularly interested in advanced applications of research computing to aid in generating high fidelity data sets for machine learning applications as well as the use of advanced simulation methods to study peptide and protein adsorption to interfaces.

== Awards and recognition ==
- 2021 Google Cloud Research Innovator
- 2020 Faculty Appreciation for Career Education & Training Award, University of Washington
- 2013 NAE Frontiers of Engineering Education Participant
- 2013 University of Washington Presidential Distinguished Teaching Award
- 2013 ACS COMP OpenEye Outstanding Junior Faculty Award
- 2012 National Science Foundation CAREER Award
- 2012 National Academy of Sciences Kavli Fellow
- 2011 ACS PRF Doctoral New Investigator Award
- 2007 NSF International Research Fellowship
