= Laura Bottomley =

American electrical engineer

- Born: January 17, 1964 (age 62); Kinston, North Carolina, USA
- Spouse: Gregory E. Bottomley (m. 1984)
- Awards: Sharon Keillor Award for Women in Engineering Education

Academic background
- Education: BSc, MSc, electrical engineering, 1985, Virginia Tech; PhD, 1992, North Carolina State University
- Thesis: Traffic measurements on a working wide area network (1992)
- Website: engr.ncsu.edu/theengineeringplace/

Laura Lynne Jones Bottomley (born January 17, 1964) is an American electrical engineer. She is the founding director of "The Engineering Place," a K-12 outreach program, the founding director of the Women in Engineering Program, and an adjunct teaching professor of electrical engineering at North Carolina State University.

== Early life and education ==
Bottomley was born on January 17, 1964, in Kinston, North Carolina. She was born into an academically involved family; her father was an engineer, and her mother was an English major. After being inspired by Star Trek in middle-school, Bottomley earned her Bachelor of Science and Master of Science degrees in engineering from Virginia Tech. In 2024, Bottomley was inducted into the Virginia Tech's Academy of Distinguished Alumni. While she interviewed at NASA following her master's degree, Bottomley chose to work at AT&T Bell Laboratories in New Jersey. After two years at Bell Laboratories, she enrolled at North Carolina State University (NCSU) and earned her PhD in electrical and computer engineering.

== Career ==
Upon receiving her PhD, Bottomley began teaching undergraduate and graduate electrical engineering courses at Duke University. She joined the Faculty of Engineering at NCSU in 1997, and founded an engineering outreach program called "The Engineering Place" in 1999. While she originally used a National Science Foundation grant to develop an outreach program aimed at high schoolers, she found that earlier intervention was necessary to encourage women to join STEM fields. As such, Bottomley and 23 engineering graduate fellows went to elementary schools in the United States to redevelop science lessons so they would appeal to children with different learning styles. She reckons that she has talked with over 100,000 children about engineering and science since her career began, She also became the founding director of NCSU's Women in Engineering program and served as a consultant to the North Carolina Department of Public Instruction and Wake County Public Schools. In recognition of her efforts, Bottomley was awarded the Presidential Award for Excellence in Science, Mathematics, and Engineering Mentoring in 2007 and 2009. She also received the 2009 Meritorious Achievement Award In Informal Education from the Institute of Electrical and Electronics Engineers (IEEE) for "leadership in developing and implementing programs that increase interest in science, math, technology and engineering education in elementary and secondary students."

In 2012, Bottomley was named the 2011 Woman of the Year by the NC Triangle Chapter of the Women’s Transportation Seminar. Bottomley was also named a Fellow of the American Society for Engineering Education. In 2016, Bottomley was named a Fellow of the Institute of Electrical and Electronics Engineers for increasing student interest in STEM education. She was also the co-recipient of the a Claire L. Felbinger Award for Diversity for the College's Women and Minority Engineering Programs from ABET. In 2023, Bottomley received the Sharon Keillor Award for Women in Engineering Education in recognition of her efforts to encourage women to join the field of engineering.

== Personal life ==
Bottomley married Gregory E. Bottomley in 1984. They have two children together. In 2016, Bottomley appeared in a Super Bowl commercial entitled "Doing Good with STEM."
