= Philippe Fauchet =

- Title: Bruce and Bridgitt Evans Dean, Vanderbilt University School of Engineering

Academic background
- Education: Faculté polytechnique de Mons; Brown University; Stanford University

Academic work
- Institutions: University of Rochester; Vanderbilt University
- Notable students: Sharon M. Weiss

Philippe Max Fauchet is a Belgian-born engineer and academic. He has served as Bruce and Bridgitt Evans Dean of the Vanderbilt University School of Engineering since July 2012.

Fauchet received an undergraduate degree from the Faculté polytechnique de Mons in 1978. He completed a Master of Science in engineering at Brown University and a Ph.D. in applied physics at Stanford University in 1984. Fauchet received a Sloan Research Fellowship in 1988.

Between 1990 and 2012, Fauchet taught at the University of Rochester; he served as chair of the university's Department of Electrical and Computer Engineering from 2010 to 2012. Fauchet was named Dean of the Vanderbilt University School of Engineering in December 2011. He assumed the position in July 2012, succeeding Kenneth Galloway. Among Fauchet's stated priorities for the school early in his tenure were developing a culture of entrepreneurship and increasing collaboration. He was reappointed for another five-year term as Dean in 2017.

== Honors and awards ==
- Fellow, National Academy of Inventors, 2016
- Fellow, American Association for the Advancement of Science, 2016
- Fellow, Materials Research Society, 2011
- Fellow, SPIE, 2010
- Fellow, Institute of Electrical and Electronics Engineers, 1999
- Fellow, American Physical Society, 1998
- Fellow, Optical Society of America, 1998
- Sloan Research Fellow, 1988
