= Pfaendtner =

Pfaendtner is a surname. Notable people with the surname include:

- Jeff Pfaendtner (born 1967), American rower
- Jim Pfaendtner, American chemical engineer
