= Malgorzata S. Zywno =

Canadian engineer

- Occupation: Professor of engineering
- Awards: Sharon Keillor Award for Women in Engineering Education Medal for Distinction in Engineering Education, Canadian Council of Professional Engineers Order of Honour, Professional Engineers Ontario

Academic background
- Education: Technical University of Lodz, University of Toronto, Glasgow Caledonian University

Academic work
- Discipline: Engineering
- Institutions: Toronto Metropolitan University

Malgorzata (Gosha) S. Zywno Ph.D P.Eng is a Canadian engineer, and professor of engineering at Toronto Metropolitan University. She is a 3M Teaching Fellow.

== Life and work ==
Zywno was born in Poland and arrived in Canada as a government-sponsored refugee, after she refused to join the Polish Communist Party or work for the secret police.

She graduated from the Technical University of Lodz, the University of Toronto, and from Glasgow Caledonian University. She received her P.Eng licence in 1984.

In her role at Toronto Metropolitan University she is a member of the Ryerson Women in Engineering Committee which encourages young women to consider engineering as a field of study.

== Awards and honours ==
She has received several awards for her teaching work, and promotion of engineering to women:

- Sharon Keillor Award for Women in Engineering Education from the American Society for Engineering Education (2005)
- Medal for Distinction in Engineering Education from the Canadian Council of Professional Engineers
- Member of the Professional Engineers Ontario Order of Honour

== Works ==
- "Student Learning Styles, Web Use Patterns, and Attitudes toward Hyper-Media Enhanced Instruction". Frontiers in Education, 2003. FIE 2003. 33rd Annual. IEEE. 2003. ISBN 978-0-7803-7961-9.
