= Gordon Prize =

Engineering award

Bernard M. Gordon Prize

The Bernard M. Gordon Prize was started in 2001 by the United States National Academy of Engineering. Its purpose is to recognize leaders in academia for the development of new educational approaches to engineering. Each year, the Gordon Prize awards $500,000 to the grantee, of which the recipient may personally use $250,000, and his or her institution receives $250,000 for the ongoing support of academic development. Although the Gordon Prize is relatively new, within engineering education, it is viewed by many to be the American equivalent of the Nobel Prize.

== Selection criteria ==
- The nominee's ability to develop educational paradigms that create and develop engineering leadership skills and attitudes. Among the contemporary areas needing emphasis are: communication skills; teamwork skills; “hands-on” experience; innovative capacity; inventiveness and “drive”; ability to share, access, and interpret large volumes of information; and an interdisciplinary focus.
- Demonstrated impact on the above-cited emphasis areas and the transferability of the innovation. Additional criteria can include demonstrated effect on prior students (proportion of students pursuing careers in industry, active engagement in elective student design opportunities, pursuit of advanced engineering education, etc.), student evaluation of relevant courses, and peer recognition of the uniqueness of the new teaching approach.
- Significant impact within the institution and/or replication at other institutions.
- Emphasis on project success.
- Success in producing engineering leaders - nominators should identify individuals who have benefited from the innovation, including their past and present positions.
- The potential of the nominee(s) to utilize the recognition and resources conferred by the prize to enhance and extend the innovative approach, including (but not limited to) replication of the innovation within other academic settings.

== Recipients ==
- 2026 T. Alan Hatton from Massachusetts Institute of Technology for advancing an immersive, industry-integrated educational model that has produced thousands of engineering leaders, strengthening U.S. technological competitiveness and workforce readiness.
- 2025 Georges Belfort and Steven M. Cramer (Rensselaer Polytechnic Institute) for advancing the state of the art in downstream bioprocessing and educating generations of industry and academic leaders who transformed and grew the biotechnology industry.
- 2023 Azad M. Madni from USC Viterbi School of Engineering for creating and disseminating a transdisciplinary systems engineering education paradigm based on leadership, innovation, entrepreneurship, convergence, social awareness, and diverse thinking and backgrounds.
- 2022 Jenna P. Carpenter (Campbell University), Thomas C. Katsouleas (University of Connecticut), Richard K. Miller (Franklin W. Olin College of Engineering), and Yannis C. Yortsos (USC Viterbi School of Engineering) for creating an innovative education program that prepares students to become future engineering leaders who will address the NAE Grand Challenges of Engineering.
- 2021 Linda G. Griffith and Douglas A. Lauffenburger from Massachusetts Institute of Technology for the establishment of a new biology-based engineering education, producing a new generation of leaders capable of addressing world problems with innovative biological technologies.
- 2020 David M. Kelley from Hasso Plattner Institute of Design Stanford University for formalizing the principles and curriculum of “design thinking” to develop innovative engineering leaders with empathy and creative confidence to generate high-impact solutions.
- 2019 Paul J. Benkeser, Joseph M. Le Doux, and Wendy C. Newstetter from Georgia Tech and Emory University for fusing problem-driven engineering education with learning science principles to create a pioneering program that develops leaders in biomedical engineering.
- 2018 Paul G. Yock from Stanford University for the development and global dissemination of Biodesign, a biomedical technology program creating leaders and innovations that benefit patients.
- 2017 Julio M. Ottino from Northwestern University for an educational paradigm that merges analytical, rational left-brain skills with creative, expansive right-brain skills to develop engineering leaders.
- 2016 Diran Apelian, Arthur C. Heinricher, Richard F. Vaz and Kristin K. Wobbe from Worcester Polytechnic Institute for a project-based engineering curriculum developing leadership, innovative problem solving, interdisciplinary collaboration and global competencies.
- 2015 Simon Pitts and Michael B. Silevitch from Northeastern University for developing an innovative method to provide graduate engineers with the necessary personal skills to become effective engineering leaders.
- 2014 John P. Collier, Robert J. Graves, Joseph J. Helble and Charles E. Hutchinson from Dartmouth College for creating an integrated program in engineering innovation from undergraduate through doctorate to prepare students for engineering leadership.
- 2013 Richard Miller, David Kerns, Jr., and Sherra Kerns from Franklin W. Olin College of Engineering for the foundation of Olin College and its student-centered approach to developing effective engineering leaders.
- 2012 Clive L. Dym, M. Mack Gilkeson, and J. Richard Phillips from Harvey Mudd College for creating and disseminating innovations in undergraduate engineering design education to develop engineering leaders.
- 2011 Edward Crawley from MIT for cofounding the CDIO Initiative, by innovating and rethinking engineering education. CDIO currently has over 50 collaborators worldwide.
- 2009 Thomas H. Byers and Tina Seelig for pioneering, continually developing, and tirelessly disseminating technology entrepreneurship education resources for engineering students and educators around the world. (STVP Program at Stanford University)
- 2008 Jacquelyn F. Sullivan and Lawrence E. Carlson for the Integrated Teaching and Learning Program that infuses hands-on learning throughout K-16 engineering education to motivate and prepare tomorrow's engineering leaders.
- 2007 Arthur W. Winston, Harold S. Goldberg, and Jerome E. Levy for innovation in engineering and technology education. They were founders and lecturers at the Gordon Institute during its early years.
- 2006 Jens E. Jorgensen, John S. Lamancusa, Lueny Morell, Allen L. Soyster, and Jose Zayas-Castro, for creating the Learning Factory, where multidisciplinary student teams develop engineering leadership skills by working with industry to solve real-world problems.
- 2005 Edward J. Coyle, Leah H. Jamieson and William C. Oakes for innovations in the education of tomorrow's engineering leaders by developing and disseminating the Engineering Projects in Community Service (EPICS) program.
- 2004 Frank S. Barnes for pioneering an Interdisciplinary Telecommunications Program (ITP) that produces leaders who bridge engineering, social sciences, and public policy.
- 2002: Eli Fromm for innovation that combines technical, societal, and experiential learning into an integrated undergraduate engineering curriculum.

== See also ==
- List of engineering awards
- List of awards named after people
