= Rui de Figueiredo =

American artificial intelligence engineer

- Born: 19 April 1929; Panjim, Goa, Portuguese India
- Died: 22 July 2013 (aged 84); College Station, Texas
- Education: Massachusetts Institute of Technology; Harvard University
- Awards: IEEE CAS Society Technical Achievement Award (1994); IEEE CAS Society Mac Van Valkenburg Award (2002); Kapitsa Medal (2009)
- Scientific career
- Fields: Electrical Engineering; Applied Mathematics
- Workplaces: Rice University; University of California, Irvine
- Doctoral advisor: Philippe Le Corbeiller
- Doctoral students: Sarah Rajala

Rui José Pacheco de Figueiredo (19 April 1929 – 22 July 2013) was an electrical engineer, mathematician, computer scientist, and a professor of electrical engineering, computer engineering, and applied mathematics at Rice University and at the University of California, Irvine.

== Life and career ==
de Figueiredo was born on 19 April 1929 in Panjim, Goa where he grew up the second of four boys. His parents were João Manuel Pacheco de Figueiredo and Maria Alcina da Rocha Pinto. He was identified very early on as academically gifted and musically talented. From the ages of four to nine he was home schooled in Portuguese by tutors in various subjects including maths, science, and music. At the age of nine he entered the Liceu where he continued his studies. In 1945, professors from the Trinity College of Music in London assessed his piano performance, commenting that his play of the scales was "as graceful as the gliding of skates on virgin ice." He acquired the title of Licenciate of the Trinity College and was awarded a fully funded scholarship to pursue music at the school in London. After careful consideration, his parents advised him to decline the offer as they felt he was too young, at age 16, to live alone in London. After graduating from high school, he left India to attend the Massachusetts Institute of Technology, where he received a BS degree in 1950, and an MS degree in 1952. He subsequently received a PhD from Harvard University in 1959.

de Figueiredo worked as a consultant for the Portuguese Atomic Energy Commission while finishing his PhD, and upon graduation, became the head of the Applied Maths and Physics Division of the Nuclear Research Centre, in Sacavém, Portugal. In 1962, he returned to the United States to take a tenured position as an associate professor in the School of Electrical Engineering at Purdue University. In 1965, he became a full professor jointly appointed in the Departments of Electrical and Computer Engineering and Applied Mathematics at Rice University. In 1990, Figueiredo was a professor in both the Electrical Engineering and Computer Science Department and Mathematics Department at the University of California, Irvine. He also was founder and Director of the Laboratory for Intelligent Signal Processing and Communications at UCI.

de Figueiredo was married to Isabel Colaço de Figueiredo and has five children, Alcina Dalton, Paulo (Paul) de Figueiredo, João (John) de Figueiredo, Rui de Figueiredo Jr., and Miguel (Michael) de Figueiredo. Rui Jr., is a professor at Haas School of Business.

== Work ==
Figueiredo is best known for his work developing novel mathematical foundations for the solution of fundamentally nonlinear problems, with applications in pattern recognition, signal processing, image processing, and neural networks. His work supported a variety of NASA space exploration projects, assisted the Department of Defense in weapons detection systems, helped companies identify credit card fraud, assisted the Environmental Protection Agency in oil spill detection and source matching, developed algorithms for more efficient transmission of mobile telecommunications signals, enhanced geophysical images for well-logging, and improved the early detection of brain and neural diseases, like Alzheimer's disease. In the early 1970s, Figueiredo introduced approaches for generalised splines for optimal signal based recovery to the field of signal processing. One of his most well-known contributions was the invention and study of the Generalised Fock space F, a Reproducing Kernel Hilbert Space of input-output maps of generic nonlinear dynamical systems, and used a "linear" orthogonal projection in F for optimal recovery of such "nonlinear" maps from the input-output data. This approach extended to nonlinear systems the powerful orthogonal projection method, previously used exclusively for linear systems. The analytics behind this approach are represented as neural networks, which ultimately led to the development of Figueiredo's Optimal Interpolation neural network and CDL neural network. Related to his work in neural networks, Figueiredo is also known for his contributions to the understanding of nonlinear filters. In this area, Figueiredo developed filters for adaptive image restoration, for image contrast sharpening tuned to human visual perception based on Munsell's scale, and for non-Gaussian noise suppression. The results of his work can be found in over 400 scientific publications he authored.

Selected publications:

- 1971. "Optimal spline digital simulators of analog filters". With A.N. Netravali. IEEE Trans. on Circuit Theory, pp. 711–717, vol. CT-18, 1971.
- 1980. "A best approximation framework and implementation for simulation of large-scale non-linear systems". With T.A.W. Dwyer, III. IEEE Trans. on Circuits and Systems, pp. 1005–1014, vol. CAS-27, no. 11, 1980.
- 1986. "A general moment-invariants/attributed-graph method for 3D object recognition from a single image". With B. Bamieh. IEEE Journal of Robotics and Automation, pp. 31–41, vol. RA-2, no. 1, 1986.
- 1991. "A theory of photometric stereo for a class of diffuse, non-Lambertian surfaces". With H.D. Tagare. IEEE Transactions on Pattern Analysis and Machine Intelligence, pp. 133–152, vol. 13, no. 2, 1991.
- 1998. "A new neural network for cluster detection and labeling". With T. Eltoft. IEEE Trans. on Neural Networks, pp. 1021–1035, vol. 9, no. 5, 1998.
- 2002. "Sampled-Function Weighted Order Filters". With R. Oten. IEEE Trans. on Circuits and Systems—Part II: Analog and Digital Signal Processing, pp. 1–10, vol. 49, 2002.

== Awards and honours ==
- Kapitsa Medal, 2009.
- Russian Academy of Natural Sciences, Foreign Member, 2007.
- George V. Chilingar Medal of Honor, 2007.
- International Informatization Academy, Member, 2004.
- Russian Popov Society, Honorary Member, 2004.
- Gh. Asachi Medal, 2003.
- IEEE Transactions on Circuits and Systems Guellemin-Cauer Best Paper Award, 2003.
- IEEE Circuits and Systems Society, Mac Van Valkenburg Society Award, 2002.
- IEEE Third Millennium Medal, 2000.
- IEEE Circuits and Systems Society Golden Jubilee Medal, 1999.
- IEEE Circuits and Systems Society, Distinguished Lecturer, 1996–2001.
- IEEE Circuits and Systems Society, Technical Achievement Award, 1994.
- IEEE Ocean Engineering Society, Distinguished Lecturer, 1992–1994.
- IEEE, ASA, AIAA Technical Educator of the Year, 1990.
- NCR Faculty Excellence, 1988.
- IEEE Life Fellow, 1976.
