= Jenna Carpenter =

American mathematician, academic and STEM researcher

Jenna P. Carpenter
- Born: Jenna P. Carpenter; Corsicana, Texas, United States
- Education: Louisiana Tech University (BS); Louisiana State University (MS, PhD)
- Known for: STEM research
- Scientific career
- Fields: Mathematics
- Institutions: Campbell University
- Doctoral advisor: Robert Perlis

Jenna P. Carpenter is the Founding Dean and Professor of Engineering at Campbell University. She was on the faculty at Louisiana Tech University for twenty-six years, where she was most recently the Associate Dean for Undergraduate Studies and Wayne and Juanita Spinks Professor of Mathematics in the College of Engineering and Science. She became the Founding Dean of Engineering and Professor of Engineering at Campbell University in 2015. She researches the importance of diversity in STEM fields, mainly focusing on women, as well as innovative STEM curricula.

== Early life, education and career ==
Carpenter was born in Corsicana, Texas. She grew up in Hope, Arkansas, and went on to receive her B.S. in mathematics from Louisiana Tech University. She furthered her education to receive her M.S. and Ph.D. in mathematics at Louisiana State University, where she held an LSU Alumni Federation Fellowship.

After receiving her Ph.D. in 1989, she returned to Louisiana Tech University to become an assistant professor. She later on rose to become a Director (Department Head) in the College of Engineering and Science for 10 years and later as the Wayne and Juanita Spinks Endowed Professor and Associate Dean for another 8 years. In 2015, she was hired by Campbell University for the position of Founding Dean of Engineering.

Carpenter's research focuses on integrated STEM curricula and improving the success of women in STEM fields. To date she has received over 4.3 million dollars in federal funding. She regularly speaks around the country about her research, and one of her most well known speeches is her TEDx talk (“Engineering: Where are the girls and why aren’t they here?”).

In October 2023 Carpenter was elected president of the Mathematical Association of America, effective July 2024.

== Awards and honors ==
Carpenter has received several awards, among which are:

- College of Engineering and Science T. L. James Award for Outstanding Achievement in Teaching (awarded to the Freshman Integrated Engineering Curriculum Team), Louisiana Tech University (1997-1998)
- Louisiana Tech University Foundation Professorship Award (for excellence in teaching, research and service) (2004)
- Louisiana Tech University Foundation Professorship Award (for excellence in teaching, research and service) (2004)
- Mathematical Association of America Louisiana-Mississippi Section Award for Distinguished College or University Teaching of Mathematics (2004)
- American Society for Engineering Education Mathematics Division Distinguished Educator and Service Award (2006)
- National Recognition Award, College of Engineering and Science, Louisiana Tech University (2012)
- American Society for Engineering Education Fellow (2013)
- Transformative Research Award (with Dr. Patrick O’Neal), College of Engineering and Science, Louisiana Tech University (2014)
- Wayne and Juanita Spinks Endowed Professorship, Louisiana Tech University (2004-2015)
- Women in Engineering ProActive Network (WEPAN) Founder's Award (2018)
- American Society for Engineering Education Sharon Keillor Award for Women in Engineering Education (2019)
- National Academy of Engineering Bernard M. Gordon Prize for Innovation in Engineering and Technology Education (2022)

== Selected publications ==
- Using Makerspaces to attract and retain women in STEM (J. P. Carpenter) MAA FOCUS (2018)
- Attracting and retaining a diverse cohort of engineering majors: Building a program from the ground up (J. P. Carpenter, L. K. Rynearson, L. A. Albers, et al.) Proceedings of the American Society for Engineering Education Conference (2017)
- Building a more supportive climate for women in STEM: Discoveries made, lessons learned (J. P. Carpenter and D. P. O'Neal) Proceedings of the American Society for Engineering Education Conference (2013)
- Undergraduate mathematics for the life sciences: Models, processes, and directions (G. Ledder, J. P. Carpenter and T. Comar) MAA Notes Series (2013)
- Using Web-based technologies to reach and engage millennial students in calculus (J. P. Carpenter) Proceedings of the 2009 American Society for Engineering Education Conference (2009)
