= Christi Luks =

American chemical engineer

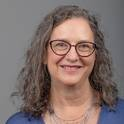

Academic background
- Education: Texas A&M University; University of Tulsa

Academic work
- Discipline: Chemical and Biomolecular Engineering
- Institutions: University of Tulsa; Missouri University of Science and Technology

Christi Patton Luks is an American chemical engineer who is the incoming president-elect of the American Society for Engineering Education. She is a teaching professor at the Missouri University of Science and Technology. Luks worked at the University of Tulsa for over twenty years.

== Education ==
Luks received a bachelor's degree in chemical engineering from Texas A&M University. She completed a master's degree in applied mathematics and a Ph.D. in chemical engineering from the University of Tulsa. Her 1993 dissertation was titled, Solute Separabilities in Solvent Gas-Rich Liquid-Liquid-Vapor Systems Topographical and Molecular Consideration. Kraemer D. Luks was her doctoral advisor.

== Career ==
Luks began her academic career at the University of Tulsa, where she spent over twenty years teaching and contributing to the chemical engineering field. During her tenure, she made the uncommon choice to focus on teaching rather than the more traditional research-intensive career path. This decision was considered unconventional at the time, but she embraced it as an opportunity to concentrate on her strengths in teaching and mentoring students.

In 2014, Luks joined the faculty at Missouri University of Science and Technology (S&T) as an associate teaching professor in the departments of chemical and biochemical engineering. She advanced to the rank of teaching professor in 2019. Her work at S&T also includes serving as the associate chair of the Linda and Bipin Doshi Department of Chemical and Biochemical Engineering.

Luks has been actively involved with the American Society for Engineering Education (ASEE) since attending its conference in Rolla, Missouri, in 1998. Over the years, she has chaired and presented at numerous ASEE events and has been recognized for her efforts with several awards. She held leadership roles within the organization, including vice president for professional interest councils from 2021 to 2022 and vice president for member affairs, a position she held as of 2024. In March 2024, Luks was elected president-elect of ASEE. She will officially began her term following the organization's annual conference in Portland, Oregon, in June 2024, and will assume the role of president after the 2025 ASEE annual conference in Montreal. Luks will be the first teaching-focused, non-tenured professor to lead the organization.

In addition to her involvement with ASEE, Luks was elected a fellow of the American Institute of Chemical Engineers in 2020 and serves as the president of Omega Chi Epsilon.
