= Eugene M. DeLoatch =

American engineer and academic

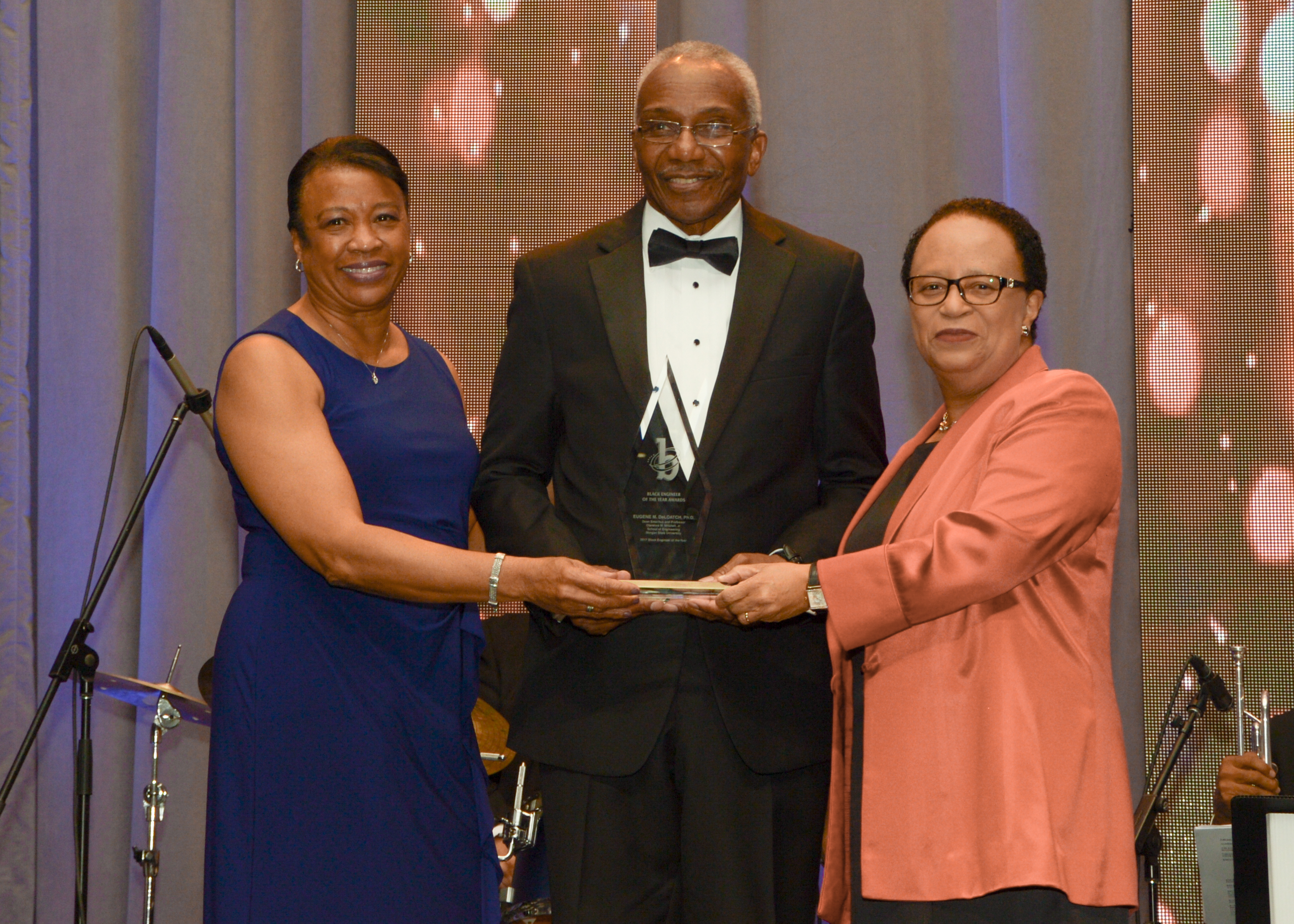
- Education: Tougaloo College; Lafayette College; Polytechnic University of Brooklyn
- Occupation: Professor
- Awards: ABET Claire L. Felbinger Award for Diversity 2014; AMIE Lifetime Achievement Award 2015; National Black College Alumni Hall of Fame 2017; Black Engineer of the Year Award (BEYA) 2017

Eugene M. DeLoatch (born 1936) in Piermont, New York, is an American academic in engineering education. DeLoatch's career has sought to expose historically marginalized communities to careers in science, technology, engineering, and math (STEM). DeLoatch founded the Clarence M. Mitchell Jr., School of Engineering at Morgan State University, where he served as an engineering professor and dean from 1984 to 2016. DeLoatch is responsible for growing the population of African American engineers in the United States to five percent from less than one percent in 1959.

== Early life and education ==
Eugene M. DeLoatch was born in 1936 and raised in Piermont, New York. He credits his awareness of the possibility of becoming an African American engineer to his high school French teacher. In 1959, DeLoatch earned his Bachelor of Science degrees in mathematics and electrical engineering from Tougaloo College, a historically black college in Mississippi, and Lafayette College in Pennsylvania. DeLoatch earned his Master of Science in electrical engineering in 1966, and his PhD in bioengineering in 1972 from Polytechnic University of Brooklyn, where he also served as a faculty member.

DeLoatch's instructing career began at the City College of New York, and later with the State University of New York. In 1960, after graduating with his advanced degrees, DeLoatch became an engineering professor at Howard University. He served as chairman of Howard's Department of Electrical Engineering for nine years.

== Career ==
In 1984, DeLoatch went on to create Morgan State University's School of Engineering, where he faced discrimination, a lack of funding, and a facility built without classrooms. DeLoatch has currently trained over 2300 African American engineering students. According to Morgan State University's page, in 2015 Morgan State University's School of Engineering graduates provided more than two-thirds of the state's African-American civil engineers, 60 percent of the African-American electrical engineers, 80 percent of the African-American telecommunications specialists, more than one-third of the African-American mathematicians, and all of Maryland's industrial engineers. DeLoatch, recently retired inaugural dean of the SOE, received the chapter’s Legacy Achievement Award at the 30th Anniversary Awards Gala of the National Society of Black Engineers Baltimore Metropolitan Area Chapter.

DeLoatch served as the chair of the department of electrical engineering for Howard University in 1975. He served as the president of the American Society of Engineering Education (ASEE) from 2002 to 2003. Additionally, he has served as the chair and dean of the Council of Engineering Deans of the Historically Black Colleges and Universities and as secretary of the board of directors for the Technology and Economic Development Corporation of Maryland. In 2017, Barack Obama recognized DeLoatch as "the best of the best" in the field of engineering. DeLoatch was named Black Engineer of the Year in that same year, 2017. DeLoatch is currently a member of the National Research Council's Board of Engineering Education and the Technical Advisory Board of the Whirlpool Corporation.

Awards

- ABET Claire L. Felbinger Award for Diversity 2014
- AMIE Lifetime Achievement Award 2015
- Tau Beta Pi Distinguished Alumnus Award 2016
- Included into the National Black College Alumni Hall of Fame 2017
- Black Engineer of the Year Award (BEYA) 2017
