= Mischa Schwartz =

American academic and electrical engineer

- Born: September 21, 1926 (age 99)
- Education: Cooper Union (undergraduate), Harvard University (graduate)
- Scientific career
- Fields: Electrical engineering
- Workplaces: Columbia University
- Doctoral advisor: Philippe Le Corbeiller

Mischa Schwartz (born September 21, 1926) is the Charles Batchelor Professor Emeritus of Electrical Engineering at Columbia University, which he joined in 1974 as professor of electrical engineering and computer science. He received the B.E.E. degree from the Cooper Union, New York, NY, in 1947, the M.E.E. degree from the Polytechnic Institute in 1949, and the Ph.D. degree in applied physics from Harvard University under the supervision of Philippe Le Corbeiller in 1951. He was the founding director (in 1985) of the NSF-sponsored Center for Telecommunications Research (CTR). He is a Life Fellow of the IEEE, and a Fellow of the AAAS. In 1992, he was elected a member of the US National Academy of Engineering for leadership in engineering education in the field of communications. He is also a past president of the IEEE Communications Society, and a former director of the IEEE.

From 1952 to 1974 he was professor of electrical engineering at the Polytechnic Institute of Brooklyn, serving as head of the Department of Electrical Engineering from 1961 to 1965.

His publications include 10 books and over 180 papers in communication theory and systems, signal processing, wireless systems, computer communication networks, and the history of communications. The awards he has received include the IEEE Education Medal and the Columbia Great Teacher Award, both awarded in 1983, the Cooper Union Gano Dunn Medal for contributions to technology, IEEE Edwin Armstrong Award for contributions to communication technology, NYC Mayor's Award for excellence in technology, Eta Kappa Nu Eminent Member award, and the 2003 Okawa Prize of Japan contributions to telecommunications and engineering education. He also received the IEEE EAB Vice-president's award in 2009 for outstanding contributions to education, theory, and practice in the field of electrical engineering.
