= Harold S. Goldberg =

American academic administrator

Harold S. Goldberg was an associate dean of the Gordon Institute, which became a graduate school of Tufts University. He received his BEE from the Cooper Union and his MEE from the New York University Tandon School of Engineering, then known as the Polytechnic Institute of Brooklyn. He won the Gordon Prize. He was the first chair of the IEEE.

Goldberg was founding president of Data Precision Company (which designed, manufactured and sold worldwide, precision digital measuring instruments) from 1971 to 1981 when it was merged with Analogic Corporation.
