= Journal of Engineering Education =

- Discipline: Engineering education
- Language: English
- Edited by: Lisa C. Benson

Publication details
- Former name(s): Bulletin of the Society for the Promotion of Engineering Education (1910-1925), Journal of Engineering Education (1925-1969), Engineering Education (1969–1991)
- History: 1910-present
- Publisher: American Society for Engineering Education (United States)
- Frequency: Quarterly
- Impact factor: 1.569 (2011)

Standard abbreviations
- ISO 4: J. Eng. Educ.

Indexing
- ISSN: 1069-4730
- LCCN: unk82051321
- OCLC no.: 44519021
- Journal of Engineering Education (1924-1969)
- ISSN: 0096-0640
- Engineering Education (1916-1924)
- ISSN: 0022-0809

Links
- Journal homepage; Online access; Online archive

The Journal of Engineering Education is a quarterly peer-reviewed academic journal covering research on engineering education that is published by the American Society for Engineering Education. The editor-in-chief is Lisa C. Benson (Clemson University).

== Abstracting and indexing ==
The journal is abstracted and indexed in:

- Science Citation Index
- Social Sciences Citation Index
- Current Contents/Engineering, Computing and Technology
- Current Contents/Social and Behavioral Sciences
- EBSCOhost
- Scopus

According to the Journal Citation Reports, the journal has a 2014 impact factor of 2.059.
