= Sharon M. Weiss =

American electrical engineer

- Education: University of Rochester (BS, MS, PhD)
- Scientific career
- Fields: Light–matter interaction, silicon photonics, porous silicon biosensors, nanotechnology, nanocomposite materials
- Workplaces: Vanderbilt University (2005–present)
- Doctoral advisor: Philippe Fauchet

Sharon M. Weiss is an American professor of electrical engineering and physics at Vanderbilt University. Weiss has been awarded a Presidential Early Career Award for Scientists and Engineers (PECASE), an NSF CAREER award, an ARO Young Investigator Award, and the 2016–2017 IEEE Photonics Society Distinguished Lecturer award for her teaching and fundamental and applied research on silicon-based optical biosensing, silicon photonics for optical communication, and hybrid and nanocomposite material systems. She is the Cornelius Vanderbilt Chair in Engineering at Vanderbilt University, in addition to the Director of the Vanderbilt Institute of Nanoscale Science and Engineering (VINSE).

== Early life and education ==
Weiss received her PhD from the Institute of Optics at the University of Rochester, where her dissertation, "Tunable Porous Silicon Photonic Bandgap Structures: Mirrors for Optical Interconnects and Optical Switching," was supervised by Philippe Fauchet.

== Research ==
Weiss's research lab focuses on light–matter interactions and applications of photonic nanomaterials, including silicon and mesoporous silicon-based optical structures for more sensitive and faster biomolecule detection, and the ultrafast modulation of optical signals using hybrid material ring resonators.

== Awards ==
- Fellow, SPIE and OSA
- 2016–2017 IEEE Photonics Society Distinguished Lecturer
- Vanderbilt School of Engineering Excellence in Teaching Award
- Presidential Early Career Award for Scientists and Engineers (PECASE)
- ARO Young Investigator Award
- NSF CAREER Award
