= Renata Engel =

American engineer and academic administrator

Renata S. Engel is an American engineer and academic administrator serving as the vice provost for online education at Penn State World Campus. She was president of the American Society for Engineering Education from 2010 to 2011. In 1990, Engel joined the faculty of Pennsylvania State University. From 2006 to 2014, she was a professor of engineering design and engineering science and mechanics and the associate dean for academic programs at the Penn State College of Engineering. She joined the Penn State World Campus in 2014 as its associate vice provost for online program.

Engel received a B.S. in engineering science from the Pennsylvania State University. She completed a Ph.D. in engineering mechanics from the University of South Florida. Her 1988 dissertation was titled, The Dynamic Stability of an Axially Loaded Beam with Lateral Elastic Support and Damping. Norman C. Small was her doctoral advisor.
