= Sheryl Sorby =

Sheryl Ann Sorby is an American mechanical engineer and educator known for her contributions to engineering education, particularly in the area of spatial visualization. She currently serves as a professor of engineering education at the University of Cincinnati and holds the title of professor emerita of mechanical engineering-engineering mechanics at Michigan Technological University.

== Life ==
Sorby completed a B.S. in civil engineering, a M.S. in engineering mechanics, and a Ph.D. in mechanical engineering-engineering mechanics from Michigan Technological University. Her 1991 dissertation was titled, An Experimental and Numerical Study of Stress Wave Interactions with Sub-Surface Cracks. John B. Ligon was Sorby's doctoral advisor.

Sorby serves as a professor of engineering education at the University of Cincinnati and holds the title of professor emerita of mechanical engineering-engineering mechanics at Michigan Technological University, where she spent a significant portion of her career. She was elected a fellow of the American Society for Engineering Education in 2009 and served as its president from 2020 to 2021. She received the 2011 Sharon Keillor Award for Women in Engineering Education, 2021 Duncan Fraser Global Award for Excellence in Engineering Education, and the 2021 Claire L. Felbinger Award.
