= Philippe Le Corbeiller =

French-American mathematician and electrical engineer

- Born: January 11, 1891; Paris, France
- Died: July 24, 1980 (aged 89); Wassenaar, the Netherlands
- Education: École Polytechnique, University of Paris
- Known for: Nonlinear systems
- Scientific career
- Fields: Electrical engineering, mathematics, physics, economics
- Workplaces: Supélec, Harvard
- Thesis: Contribution à l’étude des formes quadratiques à indéterminées conjuguées (1926)
- Doctoral advisor: Charles Émile Picard
- Doctoral students: Peter Elias; Kumpati S. Narendra; Rui de Figueiredo; Mischa Schwartz

Philippe Emmanuel Le Corbeiller (January 11, 1891 – July 24, 1980) was a French-American electrical engineer, mathematician, physicist, and educator. After a career in France as an expert on the electronics of telecommunications, he became a professor of applied physics and general education at Harvard University. His most important scientific contributions were in the theory and applications of nonlinear systems, including self-oscillators.

== Career in France ==
Son of author and politician Jean-Maurice Le Corbeiller and his wife Marguerite Dreux, Philippe entered the École Polytechnique in 1910, training there in engineering and the mathematical sciences. During World War I he served in the French Signal Corps, earning the croix de guerre and joining the staff of Marshal Ferdinand Foch. After the war, Le Corbeiller worked on telegraphy and radio systems.

In 1926 he completed a doctorate in mathematics from the Sorbonne. His dissertation was on the arithmetic theory of Hermitian forms. Written under the supervision of Charles Émile Picard, Le Corbeiller's dissertation built upon the work of the then recently deceased Georges Humbert. From 1929 to 1939, Le Corbeiller served in the French ministry of communications (Ministère des Postes, Télégraphes et Téléphones) as a research engineer and taught at the École Supérieure d’Électricité (Supélec). From 1939 to 1941 he was technical and programming director of the French national broadcasting network (Radiodiffusion nationale). He also obtained a licence in philosophy from the Sorbonne in 1938.

== Move to Harvard ==
Le Corbeiller and his family moved to the United States in 1941, fleeing the German occupation of France. Le Corbeiller spent the rest of World War II at Harvard University, teaching electronics to US Army and Navy personnel. After the war, he became a lecturer in applied physics at Harvard, and in 1949 he was promoted to professor of both applied physics and general education. Elected fellow of the American Academy of Arts and Sciences, the Acoustical Society of America, and the Econometric Society, Le Corbeiller was also a member of the American Physical Society and the American Association for the Advancement of Science.

== Scientific and educational work ==
Le Corbeiller's research interests spanned several branches of pure and applied mathematics, as well as electromechanics, control theory, acoustics, and economics. He was a friend of Dutch physicist Balthasar van der Pol, whose work on the nonlinear theory of self-oscillating dynamical systems (see van der Pol oscillator and relaxation oscillator) Le Corbeiller extended and applied to problems in mathematics, engineering, and economics. An important contribution of Le Corbeiller's was to connect the mathematical theory of self-oscillators with the thermodynamics of engines. At Harvard, Le Corbeiller had a major influence on the work of economic theorist Richard M. Goodwin, who used concepts from nonlinear systems to describe the business cycle in macroeconomics.

Le Corbeiller also cultivated an interest in the history and philosophy of science, which he combined with his enthusiasm for general and adult education. He was actively involved in the initiative of Harvard President James Bryant Conant to develop a history of science–based general science education, collaborating in that effort with other lecturers such as Edwin C. Kemble, Gerald Holton, I. Bernard Cohen, and Thomas Kuhn.

== Personal life ==
Philippe Le Corbeiller married Dorothy Leeming, a citizen of the United States, in Paris in 1924. They had one son, Jean, who graduated from Harvard in 1948, and who worked as editor of Scientific American magazine and as professor at the Seminar and Lang Colleges of the New School for Social Research, in New York City. In 1952, Philippe Le Corbeiller's mother donated to Harvard's Fogg Museum a bouillon cup and a saucer reportedly used by Marie Antoinette during her imprisonment and passed down through Madame Campan.

After retiring from Harvard in 1960 Philippe Le Corbeiller taught briefly at the New School and at Smith College. Widowed in 1962, he married Pietronetta Posthuma, the widow of Balthasar van der Pol, in 1964 in New York City. The couple settled in the Netherlands in 1968. Le Corbeiller died in Wassenaar in 1980.

== Selected works ==
- Le Corbeiller, P. (1931). Les systèmes autoentretenus et les oscillations de relaxation. Conférences faites au Conservatoire National des Arts et Métiers les 6 et 7 mai 1931. Paris: Hermann et cie.
- Décaux, B.; Le Corbeiller, P. (1931). "Sur un système électrique auto-entreténu utilisant un tube à néon". Comptes Rendus de l'Académie des Sciences. 193 (2): 723–725.
- Le Corbeiller, P. (1932). "Sur l'entretien en oscillations du réseau passif le plus général". Comptes Rendus de l'Académie des Sciences. 194: 1564–1566.
- Le Corbeiller, P. (1932). "Le mécanisme de la production des oscillations". Annales des Postes, Télégraphes et Téléphones. 21 (1): 697–731. Reprinted in Le Corbeiller, P. (1933). "Le mécanisme de la production des oscillations". Onde Électrique. 12: 116–148.
- Le Corbeiller, P. (1933). "Les systèmes autoentretenus et les oscillations de relaxation". Econometrica. 11 (3): 328–332. doi:10.2307/1907044. JSTOR 1907044.
- Le Corbeiller, P. (1936). "The non-linear theory of the maintenance of oscillations". Journal of the Institution of Electrical Engineers. 79 (477): 361–378. doi:10.1049/jiee-1.1936.0162.
- Le Corbeiller, P. (1939). Électro-acoustique: oscillations et ondes harmoniques, transformateurs électro-mécaniques, transformateurs mécanico-acoustiques, génération d'oscillations acoustiques, acoustique physiologique, mesures. Paris: Étienne Chiron.
- Friedrichs, K. O.; Le Corbeiller, P.; Levinson, N.; Stoker, J. J. (1943). Non-linear Mechanics. Providence, RI: Brown University.
- Le Corbeiller, P. (May 1947). "Man in Transit". The Atlantic Monthly. Boston: The Atlantic Monthly Co.
- Le Corbeiller, P. (1950). Matrix Analysis of Electric Networks. Cambridge, MA: Harvard University Press.
- Le Corbeiller, P. (1951). "A new pattern in science". Journal of Chemical Education. 28 (10): 553–555. Bibcode:1951JChEd..28..553L. doi:10.1021/ed028p553.
- Le Corbeiller, P.; Yeung, Y.-W. (1952). "Duality in Mechanics". Journal of the Acoustical Society of America. 24 (4): 643–648. Bibcode:1952ASAJ...24R.451L. doi:10.1121/1.1917501.
- Cohen, I. B.; Watson, F. D., eds. (1952). "Applications of Science and the Teaching of Science". General Education in Science. Cambridge, MA: Harvard University Press. pp. 133–140.
- Le Corbeiller, P. (1953). "Crystals and the Future of Physics". Scientific American. 188 (1): 50–56. Bibcode:1953SciAm.188a..50C. doi:10.1038/scientificamerican0153-50.
- Le Corbeiller, P. (1954). "The Curvature of Space". Scientific American. 191 (5): 80–86. Bibcode:1954SciAm.191e..80C. doi:10.1038/scientificamerican1154-80.
- Le Corbeiller, P. (1960). "Two-Stroke Oscillators". IRE Transactions on Circuit Theory. 7 (4): 387–398. doi:10.1109/TCT.1960.1086719.
- Le Corbeiller, P., ed. (1963). The Languages of Science: Nine Eminent Scientists Survey Modern Developments in Scientific Communication. New York: Basic Books.
- Le Corbeiller, P.; Lukas, A. V. (1966). Dimensional Analysis. New York: Basic Systems.
