= Tina Seelig =

American educator (born 1957)

- Born: 1957 (age 68–69)
- Education: Stanford University
- Occupations: Educator, entrepreneur, author

Tina Lynn Seelig (born 1957) is an American educator, entrepreneur, and author of several books on creativity and innovation. She is a faculty member at Stanford University.

== Biography ==
In 1985, Seelig earned her PhD in neuroscience from Stanford University School of Medicine.

After completing her PhD, Seelig worked as a management consultant for Booz, Allen and Hamilton and as a multimedia producer at Compaq Computer Corporation, and founded a multimedia company called BookBrowser.

In 1999, Seelig joined Stanford University. She is currently executive director of Knight-Hennessy Scholars at Stanford University, which she joined in Oct 2020. Before that, she served as Professor of the Practice in Stanford's Department of Management Science and Engineering, as well as a faculty director of the Stanford Technology Ventures Program (STVP). She teaches courses in the Hasso Plattner Institute of Design (d.school) and led three fellowship programs in the School of Engineering that are focused on creativity, innovation, leadership and entrepreneurship.

Seelig is the author of 17 books, including:

- What I Wish I Knew When I Was 20 (2009), which Publishers Weekly said "presents a thoughtful, concise set of observations for those making the unsteady transition to adulthood";
- inGenius (2012), which Entrepreneur called "the book for head honchos who are looking to shake up corporate stagnation"; and
- Insight Out (2016), which Entrepreneur recommended for "businesses who are looking for a way to release all of the creativity they feel is locked up in their human capital."

== Honors and awards ==
Seelig is the recipient of the National Olympus Innovation Award (2008), the Gordon Prize from the National Academy of Engineering (2009), and the Silicon Valley Visionary Award (2014).

== Selected publications ==
- Seelig, Tina. What I Wish I Knew When I Was 20: A Crash Course for Making Your Place in the World. HarperCollins, 2009. ISBN 9780061735196
- Seelig, Tina. inGenius: A Crash Course on Creativity. HarperCollins, 2012. ISBN 9780062020710
- Seelig, Tina. Insight Out: Get Ideas Out of Your Head and into the World. HarperCollins, 2016. ISBN 9780062301314
