= Bevlee Watford =

American engineer and academic administrator

- Born: May 26, 1958 (age 68); Washington, D.C.
- Other name: Bevlee Artis Watford
- Education: Virginia Tech
- Awards: Sharon Keillor Award for Women in Engineering Education (2021)
- Scientific career
- Fields: Engineering education
- Workplaces: Clemson University; National Science Foundation; Virginia Tech
- Doctoral advisor: Timothy J. Greene

Bevlee Artis Watford (born March 26, 1958) is an American engineer and academic administrator who is the associate dean for equity and engagement and professor of engineering education at the Virginia Tech College of Engineering. She has served on the National Science Board since 2023. Watford was president of the American Society for Engineering Education from 2017 to 2018.

== Life ==
Watford was born on March 26, 1958, in Washington, D.C. She earned a B.S. (1981) in mining engineering and a M.S. (1983) and Ph.D. (1985) in industrial engineering and operations research from Virginia Tech College of Engineering. During her undergraduate studies, she worked for the Consolidation Coal Company as a cooperative education student. Her dissertation was titled, Simulation Software for Bulk Material Transportation System's Analysis. Timothy J. Greene was her doctoral advisor.

Watford started her career as an assistant professor of industrial engineering at Clemson University. She moved back to Virginia Tech in 1992 and became the founding executive director of its Center for the Enhancement of Engineering Diversity (CEED) and an associate professor of industrial and systems engineering. She became the associate dean for equity and engagement and a professor of engineering education in 1997 and 2005 respectively.

professor of engineering education in 2005. Watford was the 2004 to 2005 President of the Women in Engineering ProActive Network and has served on the board of directors of the National Association of Multicultural Engineering Program Administrators. From 2005 to 2007, she served as a program manager in the division of undergraduate education for the National Science Foundation (NSF), returning from 2013 to 2015 to serve as the program director for broadening participation in the division of engineering education and centers. In 2010, she was elected as a fellow of the American Society for Engineering Education and she served as its president from 2017 to 2018. Watford was its first African-American female president.

As of 2023, Watford is the associate dean for equity and engagement and professor of engineering education in the Virginia Tech College of Engineering. She works to broaden participation in engineering through outreach and student support activities. Watford has secured more than $17 million in funding and support for CEED and other student initiatives. Her research activities have focused on the recruitment and retention of students in engineering, with a particular emphasis on minoritized students. In 2023, U.S. president Joe Biden appointed Watford to the National Science Board.
