= Alice C. Parker =

American electrical engineer

Alice Cline Parker is an American electrical engineer. Her early research was focused on electronic design automation. Later in her career, her interests shifted to neuromorphic engineering, biomimetic architecture for computer vision, analog circuits, carbon nanotube field-effect transistors, and nanotechnology. She is Dean's Professor of Electrical and Computer Engineering in the USC Viterbi School of Engineering of the University of Southern California.

== Education and career ==
Parker's father, Joseph K. Cline, was a biochemist who (with Robert R. Williams) first synthesized thiamine. Because of him, she grew up interested in science from a young age. Her parents divorced when she was young, and had no money to put her through college; her high school physics teacher encouraged her to apply for an engineering scholarship, with which she supported her education. She became one of two female engineering students at North Carolina State University (NCSU), where Wayland P. Seagraves became a mentor.

After graduating from NCSU in 1970, Parker went to Stanford University on an NSF Fellowship, but was frustrated by her inability to find a faculty member who worked on brain modeling. Stanford professor Michael A. Arbib, who worked in this area, had recently moved to another university. She earned a master's degree in electrical engineering there, before marrying and following her new husband back to North Carolina. Still unable to find a research program in biomedical engineering, she returned to graduate study in computer engineering at NCSU, working on microprogrammable computer architecture with James W. Gault, and completing her Ph.D. in 1975.

She was an assistant professor at Carnegie Mellon University from 1975 to 1980, recruited there by Angel G. Jordan, and began working in high-level synthesis, the automated design of computer hardware from an algorithm describing its intended behavior. In 1980, she moved to the University of Southern California, on the recommendation of her Army Research Office grant officer, Jimmie Suttle. She has been a full professor since 1991, and has served the university as Vice Provost for Research and Vice Provost of Graduate Studies.

== Recognition ==
Parker was named a Fellow of the IEEE in 1991, "for contributions to design automation in the areas of high-level synthesis, hardware descriptive languages, and design representation". She was the 2009 winner of the Sharon Keillor Award for Women in Engineering Education. She was named to the NCSU Electrical and Computer Engineering Hall of Fame in 2017.
