= Sherra Kerns =

American physicist, engineering educator, and academic administrator

- Education: Mount Holyoke College; University of Wisconsin–Madison; University of North Carolina at Chapel Hill
- Spouse: David V. Kerns Jr.
- Children: 3
- Awards: Gordon Prize (2013)
- Scientific career
- Workplaces: Auburn University; North Carolina State University; Vanderbilt University; Olin College
- Doctoral advisor: Lawrence Meyer Slifkin

Sherra E. Kerns (née Horan) is an American physicist, engineering educator, and academic administrator who is the F.W. Olin Distinguished Professor Emerita of Electrical and Computer Engineering and the founding vice president for innovation and research at Olin College. She was president of the American Society for Engineering Education from 2004 to 2005.

== Early life ==
Kerns moved from rural Texas to the New York City area when she was in sixth grade. She completed a B.A. in physics from Mount Holyoke College. She received a master's degree in high-energy physics from the University of Wisconsin–Madison. Kerns earned a Ph.D. in solid-state physics from University of North Carolina at Chapel Hill. Her 1977 dissertation was titled, An Internal Friction Study of Impurity Defect-Dislocation Interactions in AgBr:Cd++ and AgBr:Sr++ Single Crystals. Lawrence Meyer Slifkin was her doctoral advisor. She completed postdoctoral studies in the department of biomedical engineering at Duke University as a National Institutes of Health fellow.

== Career ==
Kerns was a faculty member at Auburn University and North Carolina State University. At Vanderbilt University, she was the departmental chair of electrical and computer engineering. From 1989 to 1999, Kerns was the director of the University Consortium for Research in Space. She was elected a fellow of the Institute of Electrical and Electronics Engineers in 1999. Kerns joined Olin College in 1999 as its founding vice president for innovation and research. She researched microelectronic circuits and space electronics systems. From 2004 to 2005, Kerns was president of the American Society for Engineering Education (ASEE). She is a fellow of the ASEE. Kerns was promoted to the F.W. Olin Distinguished Professor of Electrical and Computer Engineering on September 1, 2007. She won the Gordon Prize in 2013. She is a professor emerita.

== Personal life ==
Kerns is married to electrical engineer David V. Kerns Jr.. They have three children. In the 1970s she was an international breeder of longhair cats as co-founder of Miversnit Cattery, which produced new color series in Persian and Himalayan cats. In the 1980s she applied her expertise as a feline geneticist to conservation efforts at the Carolina Tiger Rescue, caring for and working with many varieties of African and Asian big cats including tigers, lions, and caracals.
