= Sharon Keillor Award for Women in Engineering Education =

Award

The Sharon Keillor Award for Women in Engineering Education "recognizes and honors outstanding women engineering educators." Recipients hold an earned doctoral degree in an engineering discipline or related field, have at least five years of teaching experience in an engineering school, and have "an outstanding record in teaching engineering students."

The award has been given annually since 2001.

== Recipients ==
Year	Awardee	Institution	Ref
2001	Jeannie Darby	University of California, Davis	
2002	Audeen W. Fentiman	Ohio State University	
2003	Jennifer L. Curtis	Purdue University	
2004	Rebecca Richards-Kortum	Rice University	
2005	Malgorzata S. Zywno	Ryerson University	
2006	Sara Wadia-Fascetti	Northeastern University	
2007	Julia Ross	University of Maryland, Baltimore County	
2008	Sue Ann Allen	Georgia Institute of Technology	
2009	Alice C. Parker	University of Southern California	
2010	Kauser Jahan	Rowan University	
2011	Sheryl Sorby	Michigan Technological University	
2012	Mary Besterfield-Sacre	University of Pittsburgh	
2013	Teri Reed-Rhoads	Texas A&M University	
2014	Susan McCahan	University of Toronto	
2015	Mia K. Markey	University of Texas at Austin	
2016	Karen C. Davis	University of Cincinnati	
2017	Not presented		
2018	Donna C. Llewellyn	Boise State University	
2019	Jenna Carpenter	Campbell University	
2020	Sarah Rajala	Iowa State University	
2021	Bevlee Watford	Virginia Tech	
2022	Not presented		
2023	Laura Bottomley	North Carolina State University	

== See also ==
- List of engineering awards
