= International Federation of Engineering Education Societies =

Engineering education network federation

- Abbreviation: IFEES
- Formation: 2006
- Founded at: ASEE Global Conference in Rio de Janeiro, Brazil
- Type: Professional Association
- Tax ID no.: 27-2238014
- Legal status: 501(c)(3)
- Purpose: Improving engineering education worldwide
- Headquarters: Frederick, Maryland
- Region served: Global
- President: Luis Manuel Sánchez Ruiz
- Executive Director: Hans Jürgen Hoyer
- Award: Duncan Fraser Global Award for Excellence in Engineering Education
- Website: https://www.ifees.net

The International Federation of Engineering Education Societies (IFEES) is a global network of engineering educators and allies. The missions of the federation are to enhance the effectiveness of member organizations and to contribute to the improvement of engineering education around the world. By identifying, sharing, and promoting effective engineering education processes, the federation contributes to efforts to assure a global supply of well-prepared engineering graduates.

== History ==
The origins of the federation may be traced to an early conversation in 2005 at the Global Colloquium on Engineering Education in Australia. On October 9, 2006, representatives from 29 organizations and three industrial affiliates based in 18 countries formerly established IFEES during the American Society for Engineering Education's Global Conference in Rio de Janeiro, Brazil.

In 2016, to mark its tenth anniversary, the federation published a report outlining the history, current status, and future plans. In 2016, representatives from 47 organizations and eight industrial affiliates reaffirmed their commitment to the shared mission.

== Initiatives ==
The federation organizes the annual World Engineering Education Forum (WEEF) in partnership with the Global Engineering Deans Council (GEDC) and a local host university. And the federation partners with allies to design and conduct surveys and publish new scholarship on engineering education in a global context.

== Recognition ==
To recognize individuals who have made innovative and meritorious contributions with a significant impact on the advancement of engineering education, the IFEES selects an annual recipient of the Duncan Fraser Global Award for Excellence in Engineering Education. In 2015, the annual IFEES award became the IFEES Duncan Fraser Global Award for Excellence in Engineering Education. Fraser, who died on July 19, 2014, would have been IFEES’ 5th president.

Past winners, include:

- 2024, Daniel B. Oerther, Missouri University of Science and Technology, United States
- 2023, Uriel Cukierman, Universidad Tecnológica Nacional, Argentina
- 2022, Pritpal Singh, Villanova University, United States
- 2021, William Oakes, Purdue University, United States
- 2020, Sheryl Sorby, University of Cincinnati, United States
- 2018, Khairiyah Mohd Yusof, University of Technology Malaysia, Malaysia
- 2016, Maria Larrondo Petrie, Florida Atlantic University, United States
- 2015, Stephen Lu, University of Southern California, United States
- 2014, Luiz Scavrda do Carmo, Pontifical Catholic University, Brazil
- 2013, Anette Kolmos, Aalborg University, Denmark
- 2012, Bopaya Bindanda, University of Pittsburgh, United States
- 2011, Jack Lohmann, Georgia Institute of Technology, United States
- 2010, Richard M. Felder, North Carolina State University, United States
