= Ville Rajala =

Finnish ice hockey player

- Born: June 23, 1989 (age 37) Utajärvi, Finland
- Height: 6 ft 1 in (185 cm)
- Weight: 201 lb (91 kg; 14 st 5 lb)
- Position: Forward
- Shoots: Left
- Mestis team Former teams: Hokki; Sport; KooKoo; Hermes; JHT; Kiekko-Laser
- NHL draft: Undrafted
- Playing career: 2013–present

Ville Rajala (born June 23, 1989) is a Finnish professional ice hockey player. He is currently playing for Hokki of the Finnish Mestis.

Rajala made his Liiga debut playing with Sport during the 2013–14 Liiga season.
