= Kenneth Galloway =

Kenneth F. Galloway, Sr. is an American engineer and engineering educator. He is a Distinguished Professor of Engineering, Emeritus, and Dean of the School of Engineering, Emeritus, at Vanderbilt University. He is a Fellow of the Institute of Electrical and Electronics Engineers, the American Association for the Advancement of Science, the American Society for Engineering Education and the American Physical Society.

An alumnus of Vanderbilt, he earned his doctorate from the University of South Carolina and went on to hold professional appointments at Indiana University, NAVSEA-Crane, the National Institute of Standards and Technology, the University of Maryland, and the University of Arizona before returning to Vanderbilt as Dean of the School of Engineering in 1996. He served as Dean of Engineering until 2012.

Solid-state devices, semiconductor technologies, and radiation effects in electronics have been the focus of his research and teaching. He has published numerous technical papers in these areas and has conducted research sponsored by several U.S. government organizations.
