= Sameli Rajala =

Finnish politician

Samuel (Sameli) Nestor Rajala (13 December 1858, Teuva - 23 December 1948; original surname Snellman) was a Finnish farmer, lay preacher and politician. He was a member of the Parliament of Finland from 1907 to 1910, representing the Finnish Party.
