= Electro-kinetic road ramp =

The electro-kinetic road ramp is a method of generating electricity by harnessing the kinetic energy of automobiles that drive over the ramp. The idea was dismissed as "a total waste of energy" in the Guardian by David MacKay, a professor of natural philosophy in the Department of Physics at the University of Cambridge. MacKay wrote, "The savings from parking at the green car park thus amount to one four-thousandth of the energy used by the trip to the supermarket."

== Operation ==
The electro-kinetic road ramp features a hinged ramp that pushes down on a shaft when a vehicle passes over it. This downward motion is converted into rotational motion, powering a generator. The ramp appears as a speed bump on the road but does not damage vehicles traversing it at excessive speeds.
