= Electrokinetic remediation =

Electrokinetic remediation, also termed electrokinetics, is a technique of using direct electric current to remove organic, inorganic and heavy metal particles from the soil by electric potential. The use of this technique provides an approach with minimum disturbance to the surface while treating subsurface contaminants.

== System Components ==
A basic electrokinetics remediation site contains an external direct current source, a positively charged electrode (or anode) and a negatively charged electrode (or a cathode) placed into the ground. Placement of electrodes is based on the size and shape of known contaminant plumes. The removal of contaminants and prevention of plume migration are big influences in determining the arrangement of electrodes. Each electrode is encased in a reservoir well in which an electrolytic solution can be injected. The electrolytic solutions serve both as a conducting media (or pore fluid) and as a means to extract contaminants and introduce chemicals or biological entities. Another use of the electrolytic solution is for control and/or depolarization of electrode reactions. Immersed in a solution the electrodes can result in oxidation at the anode site and the reduction at the cathodic site. The oxidation and formation of an acidic front are byproducts of the process and cause varying degree of influence to the system. By pumping, processing and testing the electrolytic solution at each electrode site you can extend the life and efficiency of the system.

== Method ==
When current is applied, by the direct power source, to the electrodes, migrations occur beneath the soil surface. Although many types of migrations occur in tandem with the current there are two driving migrations within electrokinetics; ionic migration and electrophoresis. When the electrolytic solution is injected within the soil part of the ionic solution forms a diffuse double layer with the soils and contaminants. This diffused double layer will aid in the ionic drift that will occur as the current passes through the soil and surrounding liquid, this process is called electroosmosis. The thickness of the diffused double layer is a function of ionic composition of bulk solution and the average charge density of hydration products. As the electrolyte concentration increases the diffuse double layer thickness decreases. Electrophoresis is the mass flux of charged particles under an electric field. Both processes work at the same time but in a counter current manner. The charged particles are driven by electrophoresis flow from the cathode to the anode while electrolytic solution flows from the anode to the cathode. Of the two main processes electrophoresis (or electromigration) is more dominant than electroosmosis. Electrophoresis serves as the driving factor that induces the flow of electroosmosis in the opposite direction. Electromigration also serves as the major component for ionic contaminant removal. For electromigration to occur absorbed material must be dissolved to an ionic form whether they are metals, organic or inorganic particles. Electroosmotic flow between the electrodes promotes the development of a low-pH environment in the soil. This low pH environment inhibits metallic contaminants from being sorbed onto soil particle surfaces which aids in the formation of compounds making electrokinetics possible. By this thought it is possible to acidify the soil and induce the release of absorbed heavy metals.

== Applications ==
Electrokinetic remediation is applied to many contaminants that can be dissolved within groundwater. Heavy metals are one of the main contaminants that are removed by the electrokinetics process. Some metals like cadmium (II) can be removed with high consequences on energy expenditure. Chromium (III) can be removed but with low efficiency because of the ease of hydrolysis allowing it to sorb to other substances. Chromium (IV) is also a candidate for electrokinetics removal although chromium (IV) migration is retarded in the presence of sulfur because it will break down into chromium (III). Other heavy metal species that are tested and reported to be treatable include; mercury, zinc, iron, lead, copper, and magnesium.

Electrokinetics is also possible with alkali and alkaline earth metals which travel faster in most mediums than heavy metals. At tests between 20 and 30 volts, alkali metals were known to move between 50 and 60 cm per day per volts whereas heavy metal moved at velocities between 10 and 20 cm per day per volts. It is possible that this difference could be because of the slow desorption and dissolution of heavy metals. Electrokinetics can also be used to treat polar organic compounds (phenol and acetic acid) and radionucleotides (radium), toxic anions (nitrates and sulfates), dense, non-aqueous-phase liquids (DNAPLs), cyanide, petroleum hydrocarbons (diesel fuel, gasoline, kerosene and lubricating oils), halogenated pollutants, explosives, halogenated and polynuclear aromatic hydrocarbons.

== Advantages ==
One of the advantages of electrokinetics is that the remediation can be conducted in situ (within the remediation site) to treat contaminants in low permeability zones to overcome accessibility of contaminants or delivery of treatment. Remediation can also occur ex situ (removed from the natural site) to have contaminants tested and treated within a laboratory. This versatility of treatment location can be very cost effective. Electrokinetics has the advantage of use in saturated or unsaturated soils because of the insertion of pore fluid. Remediation can also occur despite soil stratifications or homogeneity. For soils that are low in permeability like kaolinite and clayey sands it is possible to remove up to 90% of heavy metal contaminants. In many cases pretreatment of soil should be made to determine appropriate working conditions of the soil.

One thing to note is that the potential profile in soils can be determined by the ionic distribution of pore fluid. Because ion distribution effects the efficiency of the electrokinetics system, engineers like John Dzenitis have done comprehensive study to find key reactions around the electrodes that can be used to create models for ionic flowrate prediction. These models can then be interpreted to determine if electrokinetics remediation is the best choice for a given site.

== Limitations ==
A major limitation of electrokinetics is the introduction of an external fluid into the soil. If the contaminant cannot be dissolved it is not possible to extract the contaminant of interest. Electrolysis near the electrodes can alter the pH of the soil especially if the current is induced for an extended period of time. Extended use of electrokinetics system can also cause acidic conditions around the electrodes sometimes reacting with contaminants. If increased acidification of the soil is not environmentally acceptable the use of electrokinetics should be reevaluated. Large metal objects that are buried underground also pose as a limitation to electrodes because they offer a path to short circuit the system. Buried metal objects can also change the voltage gradient and decrease or stop the flow. The removal of volatile organic compounds from the soils can increase the soil vapor concentration. Counterintuitively, highly permeable soils lower the efficiency of electrokinetics. Where a low permeable soil like clay can receive up to 90% initial contaminant removal a low permeable soil like peat achieves about 65% removal of initial contaminants.

Another major limitation of the electrokinetics process is the decrease in the electric potential of the system. Different polarization effects can decrease how the system runs. For instance: Activation polarization can occur during the electrokinetic remediation process removing gas bubbles that form on the surface of the electrodes during conductivity. Resistance polarization can occur after the electrokinetic remediation process has started a white layer can be observed. Just like in hard water stains this layer may be the insoluble salt and other impurities that inhibit conductivity. Concentration polarization happens when hydrogen ions generated at the anode are attracted to the cathode and the hydroxide ions generated at the cathode are attracted to the anode. If neutralization occurs the potential between the system drops. Local flattening of the electrical potential profile can also cause the difference in migration.

== Case Studies ==
In many cases the study of specific site occurrences with electrokinetics remediation can lead to new advancements in the technology. Many times electrokinetics remediation will be coupled with other remediation forms to handle site specific issues. At a Danish Wood Perseveration copper was a heavy metal that polluted the soil in two forms; ionic solution with different complexes within the soil or a crystal lattice of soil minerals. For this site soil pH was a parameter of great importance because of an increased amount of copper present as ionic solution. By creating active barriers or exchange membranes that prevent ions from traveling from the electrode compartment into the soil. The separation of the soil from the electrode is designed to deter the acidification of the cathode and the current loss as highly mobile ions pass from electrode site through the soil.

In 1995 at the Paducah site, in Kentucky, USA a new technique was developed for removing heavy metals from soils. Called the Lasagna Process, it simply is the creation of several horizontal permeable zones used to provide treatment through the contaminated soil matrix by adding different admixtures to the electrolytic solution. Admixtures like sorbents, catalytic reagents, buffering solutions, oxidizing agents in this system are applied through a vertical system with the anode near the bottom and the cathode near the top. The orientation of vertical anode and cathode system make recycling of fluid and system treatment easier. The formation of the lasagna layers is due to fracturing in over-consolidated clays because of horizontal electrodes. Coupling of the horizontal electrodes with a vertical pressuring system make this method especially effective in removing contaminants from deeper layers of the soil. The first test of this process proved 98% effective of removing trichloroethylene from the Paducah site. Electrokinetic remediation is also suitable for use at sites with radioactive contamination.
