= Omega Chi Epsilon =

American honor society for chemical engineering students

- ΩΧΕ
- Founded: 1931; 95 years ago University of Illinois at Urbana–Champaign
- Type: Honor
- Affiliation: ACHS
- Status: Active
- Emphasis: Chemical engineering
- Scope: International
- Motto: Ode Chrototos Eggegramai “In this Society, professionalism is engraved in our minds."
- Pillars: Recognition, Investigation, Service, Comradeship, Professionalism
- Colors: Black, White and Maroon
- Symbol: Retort, Integral and Lightning Bolt
- Chapters: 80
- Members: 30,000 lifetime
- Headquarters: Omega Chi Epsilon c/o Dr. Richard A. Davis; Executive Secretary; Chemical Engineering Dept., University of Minnesota Duluth; 176 Engineering Building; 1303 Ordean Ct; Duluth, Minnesota 55812; United States
- Website: www.omegachiepsilon.org

Omega Chi Epsilon (or ΩΧΕ, sometimes simplified to OXE) is an International honor society for chemical engineering students.

== History ==
The first chapter of Omega Chi Epsilon was formed at the University of Illinois in 1931 by a group of chemical engineering students. These founders were John W. Bertetti, A. Garrell Deem, F. C. Howard, and Ethan M. Stifle. Professors D. B. Keyes and Norman Krase supported the students in their efforts.

The Beta chapter was formed in the Iowa State University 1932. The society grew slowly at first. Baird's Manual indicates there were six chapters by 1957, of which three were inactive. However, interest was revived in the 1960s, allowing a sustained growth that has continued to the present day. There are approximately eighty active chapters of the society as of 2021.

Omega Chi Epsilon amended its constitution to permit women to become members as of 1966. The organization became a member of the Association of College Honor Societies in 1967.

== Symbols ==
The society's name comes from its motto Ode Chrototos Eggegramai or "In this Society, professionalism is engraved in our minds". The Greek letters ΩΧΕ were chosen to stand for "Order of Chemical Engineers".

The society's official seal is made of two concentric circles, bearing at the top, center the words "Omega Chi Epsilon" with the words "Founded, 1931" at the bottom center. The letters of the society appear in the center of the seal. The society's colors are black, white, and maroon.

The society's badge is a black Maltese cross background, on which is superimposed a circular maroon crest. The crest bears the letters ΩΧΕ on a white band passing across the horizontal midline. Above the white band are two crossed retorts rendered in gold. Below the white band are a gold integral sign and a lightning bolt. These symbols are noted to represent the roles of chemistry, mathematics, and physics in chemical engineering.

== Activities ==
Chapter traditions of service to their chemical engineering departments commonly prevail rather than broader, national traditions.

== Membership ==
Membership is limited to chemical engineering juniors, seniors, and graduate students. Associate membership may be offered to professors or other members of the staff of institutions within the field.

== Chapters ==
Omega Chi Epsilon has chartered 80 chapters at colleges and universities in the United States, Qatar, and the United Arab Emirates.

== Governance ==
The Society's annual meeting is held at the same time and place as the annual meeting of the American Institute of Chemical Engineers.

Governance is vested in a national president, vice president, executive secretary, and treasurer. With the immediate past president, these constitute the Executive Committee. The current national president is Christi Luks of the Missouri University of Science and Technology.

== See also ==
- American Institute of Chemical Engineers
- Honor society
- Honor cord
- Professional fraternities and sororities
