= Vanderbilt University School of Engineering =

Coordinates: 36.144828°N 86.802101°W

- Motto: Insight. Innovation. Impact
- Type: Private
- Established: 1879
- Endowment: $552.3 million^{[A]}
- Dean: Philippe Fauchet
- Faculty: 144
- Undergraduates: 1,305
- Location: Nashville, TN, U.S.
- Website: engineering.vanderbilt.edu

The School of Engineering provides undergraduate and graduate education in engineering and the engineering sciences at Vanderbilt University, a major research university located in Nashville, Tennessee. Founded in 1879, the Vanderbilt School of Engineering is the oldest private school of engineering in the American South. The school has an exceptionally high percentage of female engineers, 41.6%, compared to a national average of 22.5%.

== Ranking ==
The School of Engineering ranks as one of the top engineering schools in the United States. The U.S. News & World Report ranks Vanderbilt as the 31st best undergraduate engineering school in the country. The Graduate School of Engineering ranks at 34th.

Field	Ranks
Undergraduate School of Engineering	31
Graduate School of Engineering	34
Biomedical Engineering	20
Chemical Engineering	36
Civil Engineering	49
Electrical/Electronics/Communications Engineering	38
Environmental Engineering	51
Material Sciences	55
Mechanical Engineering	43

== Research ==
Vanderbilt is classified as a "Research University (very high research activity)," by the Carnegie Foundation and is engaged in some of the most important engineering research and cross-disciplinary research conducted in the nation. Spanning biomedical, civil, chemical, environmental, electrical, mechanical engineering and computer science fields, Vanderbilt also has special expertise in key research areas. In November 2014, the federal Office of Research Integrity announced that a scientist who worked for Vanderbilt's Department of Biomedical Engineering fraudulently falsified many biomedical research articles from 2000 to 2005 in high-profile scientific journals.

=== Research institutes ===
Vanderbilt University houses many specialized research centers. They are as follows:

- Center for Intelligent Mechatronics
- Center for Intelligent Systems (CIS)
- Center for Technology-Guided Therapy
- Consortium for Risk Evaluation with Stakeholder Participation (CRESP)
- Institute for Software Integrated Systems (ISIS)
- Institute for Space and Defense Electronics, the largest such academic facility in the world.
- Vanderbilt Center for Environmental Management Studies (VCEMS)
- Vanderbilt Engineering Center for Transportation Operations and Research (VECTOR)
- Vanderbilt Institute for Integrative Biosystems Research and Education
- Vanderbilt Institute of Imaging Science
- Vanderbilt Institute of Nanoscale Science and Engineering (VINSE)
- Vanderbilt Institute for Surgery and Engineering (VISE)
- The Biophotonics Center at Vanderbilt

== Clubs and organizations ==
Vanderbilt Engineering Council

Representatives selected from various campus engineering societies participate in the Vanderbilt Engineering Council, which provides engineering students a voice in the school's decisions and facilitates communication among administration, faculty, and students. Officers of the Engineering Council are elected by the engineering student body.

National engineering societies

The leading national engineering societies have chartered branches or student sections at the School of Engineering. These student-run organizations are devoted to technical issues. Meetings might include films, speakers, or field trips. Freshmen and sophomores are invited to attend meetings, while juniors and seniors are urged to join the appropriate professional society.
