= Audeen W. Fentiman =

American engineer and academic

- Awards: Sharon Keillor Award for Women in Engineering Education

Academic background
- Education: BSc, Mathematics, Glenville State College; MA, Mathematics, West Virginia University; MSc, PhD, Nuclear Engineering, Ohio State University
- Thesis: Transition from uranium to denatured uranium/thorium fuel in an existing PWR (1982)

M. Audeen Walters Fentiman is an American engineer. She is the Crowley Family Professor in Engineering Education at Purdue University and the Associate Dean of Graduate Education and Interdisciplinary Programs.

== Early life and education ==
Fentiman completed her Bachelor of Science degree in mathematics from Glenville State College and her Master of Arts degree in mathematics from West Virginia University. She then enrolled at Ohio State University (OSU) for her Master of Science and PhD in nuclear engineering. In 2005, Fentiman was recognized as a Distinguished Alumni by OSU's College of Engineering.

== Career ==
Following her PhD, Fentiman joined the faculty at OSU from 1990 to 2006 and held numerous roles, including Chair of the Nuclear Engineering Program and Director of the Nuclear Reactor Laboratory. In 2001, Fentiman was elected a Fellow of the American Association for the Advancement of Science. Throughout her tenure at OSU, Fentiman received numerous teaching awards, including the Sharon Keillor Award for Women in Engineering Education and Ralph L. Boyer Award for Excellence in Undergraduate Teaching Engineering Innovation. Fentiman left OSU in 2006 to join the Faculty of Engineering at Purdue University. While a Full Professor of Nuclear Engineering at Purdue, Fentiman was elected a Fellow of the American Council on Education and was also a candidate for vice president/president elect. In 2012, Fentiman was elected a Fellow of the American Nuclear Society.

== Works ==
- Radioactive Waste Management, Second Edition (2001)
