= Sarah Rajala =

American electrical engineer

Sarah Ann Rajala is a retired American electrical engineer and engineering educator, the former dean of engineering at both Mississippi State University and Iowa State University, a past president of the American Society for Engineering Education, and a member of the National Academy for Engineering.

== Education and career ==
Rajala came from a farming family in the Upper Peninsula of Michigan. She earned a bachelor's degree in electrical engineering from Michigan Technological University in 1974, the only woman in her engineering class and the third female electrical engineering graduate at the university. She continued at Rice University for graduate study, earning a master's degree in 1977 and completing her Ph.D. in 1979. Her doctoral dissertation, Adaptive Nonlinear Image Restoration by a Modified Kalman Filtering Approach, was supervised by Rui de Figueiredo.

She joined the faculty of North Carolina State University, becoming the first female faculty member in her department. She remained there for 27 years until moving in 2007 to Mississippi State University as chair of the electrical and computer engineering department and James Worth Bagley Chair of Engineering. In 2008 she became dean of engineering at Mississippi State, and in 2013 she moved again to become James L. and Katherine S. Melsa Dean of Engineering at Iowa State University. She retired in 2019.

She served as president of the American Society for Engineering Education for 2008–2009. She has also chaired the Global Engineering Deans Council and the ABET Engineering Accreditation Council.

== Recognition ==
Rajala was named a Fellow of the IEEE in 2001, "for contributions to engineering education". She became a Fellow of the American Society for Engineering Education in 2007, and a Fellow of the American Association for the Advancement of Science in 2008; she is also an ABET Fellow.

Rajala was the 2015 winner of the IEEE Harriett B. Rigas Award. In 2016 the American Association of Engineering Societies named her national engineer of the year, "for her outstanding leadership at the institutional as well as at national and international levels impacting multiple engineering societies, her innovations in engineering education and assessment, and her tireless efforts to promote diversity in engineering". She won the 2017 IEEE Award for Meritorious Achievement in Accreditation Activities, and is the 2020 winner of the Sharon Keillor Award for Women in Engineering Education of the American Society for Engineering Education.

In 2022, Rajala was elected to the National Academy of Engineering.
