= Louis Martin-Vega =

Industrial engineering researcher

- Education: University of Puerto Rico at Mayagüez (BEng); New York University (MS); University of Florida (M.Ed., PhD)
- Scientific career
- Workplaces: North Carolina State University Lehigh University Florida Institute of Technology University of Florida University of Puerto Rico at Mayagüez National Science Foundation (NFS) National Academy of Engineering (NAE)

Louis Martin-Vega is an industrial engineer who served as Dean of the College of Engineering at North Carolina State University from 2006 until 2023. He is best known for the creation of the NSF foundation wide GOALI program which allows for collaborations between academic research institutions and industries.

== Early life and education ==
Martin-Vega grew up in New York City, where his parents were a part of the air force. His family is originally from Puerto Rico, where he initially obtained his Bachelor of Science in Industrial Engineering from the University of Puerto Rico at Mayagüez.

He later earned a Master of Science in Operations Research from New York University, a Master of Engineering, and a Ph.D. in Industrial and System Engineering from the University of Florida.

== Career ==
Martin-Vega was the Dean of Engineering at the University of South Florida for five years before joining North Carolina State University in 2006, where he imparted his knowledge and expertise to a large community of over 10,000 students and 750 faculty and staff. Prior to holding the position of Dean of Engineering at North Carolina State University, Martin-Vega also served as the head of Engineering Directorate at the National Science Foundation's (NSF), Director of NFS's Division of Design, and Manufacture and Industrial Innovation.

Additionally, Martin-Vega held the Director position at the Center for Applied Research in Electronics Manufacturing at the University of Florida, as the Lockheed Professor at Florida Institute of Technology, and he was also the chair of the Department of Industrial and Manufacturing Systems Engineering at Lehigh University. Moreover, in 2021, Martin-Vega was elected as a member of the National Academy of Engineering (NAE). Throughout his career in education he has initiated significant growth within these universities.

Not only has he contributed to the educational system of engineering he has also held leadership positions at the National Science Foundation (NSF) and during his tenure as Dean of Engineering at NC State it was the only college of Engineering to lead two NSF Engineering Research Centers (ERC) at the same time. He also led NC State’s College of Engineering to its highest rankings as one of the top 25 colleges of engineering nationwide and the 12th ranked public college of engineering in the nation.

Martin-Vega's research encompasses areas such as industrial engineering, logistics, operational management, manufacturing production systems and several service systems. He has authored or co-authored over 100 journal articles, book chapters, and other publications and delivered more than 200 keynote and related presentations at national and international forums. One of the mottos Martin-Vega said he abided by was "Whatever you're doing, do the best you can at it."

In August 2022, Martin-Vega announced that he would step down from his role as Dean of the College of Engineering at North Carolina State University at the end of the 2022–23 academic school year. He remained as faculty at the University in the Fitts Department of Industrial and Systems Engineering until his retirement in January 2025. He now holds the position of Dean and Distinguished University Professor Emeritus in the department. After his retirement he remained active within the university mentoring senior design groups and guest lectures.

== Awards and honors ==
Martin-Vega has received numerous awards throughout his engineering career. These include the IIE Albert Holzman Distinguished Educator Award in 1999, the Hispanic Engineering National Education Achievement Award- HENACC in 2000, the National Hispanic Scientist of the Year Award from the Tampa Museum of Science and Industry in 2007, the Outstanding Engineer in North Carolina from the NC Society of Engineers in 2008, the Industrial and Systems Engineering Alumni Leadership Award from the University of Florida in 2009, and the Frank and Lillian Gilbreth Industrial Engineering Award in 2012. In more recent times he has been awarded the honor of becoming a member of the National Academy of Engineering(NAE) in 2021. In 2022, Martin-Vega was appointed to the Wake Tech Board of Trustees by North Carolina Governor Roy Cooper.

Martin-Vega was honored as one of the 100 most Influential Hispanics in 2007 and 2014 by Hispanic Business magazine. In addition, he was honored at the Engineering Gala, which was hosted by the Professional Engineers of North Carolina (PENC) and the North Carolina Society of Engineering to celebrate his achievements and retirement.
