= American Society for Engineering Education =

US professional organization for engineering education

- Founded: 1893
- Type: Professional organization
- Purpose: Engineering education
- Region served: Worldwide
- Method: Conferences, publications
- Key people: Stephanie Adams, President
- Website: www.asee.org

The American Society for Engineering Education (ASEE) is a non-profit member association, founded in 1893, dedicated to promoting and improving engineering and engineering technology education. The purpose of ASEE is the advancement of education in all of its functions which pertain to engineering and allied branches of science and technology, including the processes of teaching and learning, counseling, research, extension services and public relations. ASEE administers the engineering technology honor society Tau Alpha Pi.

== History ==
A full reading of the history of ASEE can be found in a 1993 centennial article in the Journal of Engineering Education.

Founded initially as the Society for the Promotion of Engineering Education (SPEE) in 1893, the society was created at a time of great growth in American higher education. In 1862, Congress passed the Morrill Land-Grant Act, which provided money for states to establish public institutions of higher education. These institutions focused on providing practical skills, especially "for the benefit of Agriculture and the Mechanic Arts". As a result of increasingly available higher education, more Americans started entering the workforce with advanced training in applied fields of knowledge. However, they often lacked grounding in the science and engineering principles underlying this practical knowledge.

After a generation of students had passed through these new public universities, professors of engineering began to question whether they should adopt a more rigorous approach to teaching the fundamentals of their field. Ultimately, they concluded that engineering curricula should stress fundamental scientific and mathematical principles, not hands-on apprenticeship experiences. To organize support for this approach to engineering education, SPEE was formed in the midst of the 1893 Chicago World’s Fair. Known as the World's Columbian Exposition, this event heralded the promise of science and engineering by introducing many Americans, for example, to the wonders of electricity. Emerging out of the Fair’s World Engineering Congress, SPEE members dedicated themselves to improving engineering education at the classroom level. Over its history, the society has put out several reports on the subject, such as the Mann Report (1907), the Wickenden Study (1920s), and the Grinter Report (1955). From 1929 to 1930, the society's president was Robert I. Rees, a retired US Army brigadier general and executive with AT&T.

During World War II, the federal government started to place more emphasis on research, prompting SPEE to form the Engineering College Research Association (ECRA), which was more concerned with research than SPEE had ever been. The ECRA spoke for most engineering researchers, sought federal funds, and collected and published information on academic engineering research. Colonel and University Dean Blake R. Van Leer was the chairman and oversaw several committees during this process. After the war, the desire to integrate the less research-oriented SPEE with the ECRA resulted in the disbanding of SPEE and the formation of ASEE in 1946.

ASEE was a volunteer-run organization through the 1950s. In 1961, ASEE established a staff headquarters in Washington, DC, and undertook a more activist posture. However, through the 1960s, the Vietnam War and social unrest, in general, made the mood on many campuses anti-technology, anti-business, and anti-establishment. In the 1960s and 1970s, ASEE presidents Merritt Williams and George Hawkins reorganized ASEE to better represent its members and return its focus to teaching. As a result of this new focus, ASEE began to administer several teaching-related government contracts, including NASA's summer faculty fellowships and the Defense Department's Civil Defense Summer Institutes and Fellowships. ASEE administered over ten government contracts, including the prestigious National Science Foundation's Graduate Research Fellowship Program until 2019.

Another result of the renewed emphasis on teaching was ASEE’s initiative for recruiting minorities and women into engineering. ASEE created the Black Engineering College Development program which used industry funding to upgrade engineering faculty in traditionally black colleges and to develop public information on these schools. ASEE also received several grants in the 1970s to research the status of women and American Indians and develop programs to attract more of these students to enter engineering. Since then, ASEE has continued to release studies on the subject in its Journal of Engineering Education, and has created divisions specifically devoted to developing programs and research in this area.

== Publications ==
ASEE produces many publications on the topic of engineering education, including the general-interest Prism, a monthly magazine covering the pervasive role of engineering in the world, the journals Journal of Engineering Education and Advances in Engineering Education, peer-reviewed journals covering research in engineering education, Profiles of Engineering and Technology Colleges, providing data on engineering colleges and universities, and the eGFI: Engineering, Go For It! magazine and associated website, designed to attract high school students and their parents and teachers to engineering.

=== Prism ===
The magazine reports about cutting-edge technology and other important trends in engineering education, including:

- New instructional methods
- Innovative curricula
- Lifelong learning
- Research opportunities, trends, and developments
- Education and research projects with government and industry K-12 outreach activities that encourage youth to pursue studies and careers in engineering.

=== Journal of Engineering Education ===
The Journal of Engineering Education is a peer-reviewed academic journal published quarterly in partnership with a global community of engineering education societies and associations. The journal is a founding member of the International Federation of Engineering Education Societies.

=== Advances in Engineering Education ===
Advances in Engineering Education covers engineering education practice, especially the creative use of multimedia.

=== Profiles of Engineering and Engineering Technology Colleges ===
This directory provides profiles of United States and Canadian schools offering undergraduate and graduate engineering, as well as engineering technology programs with the intent of preparing prospective students for their future education in engineering.

=== Computers in Education ===
Computers in Education (ISSN 1069-3769) is an academic journal covering all aspects of computation in education. It is published by the Northeast Consortium for Engineering Education on behalf of the Computers in Education Division of the American Society for Engineering Education.

== Presidents since 2000 ==
- 2000-2001 - Wallace T. Fowler
- 2001-2002 - Gerald S. Jakubowski
- 2002-2003 - Eugene M. DeLoatch
- 2003-2004 - Duane L. Abata
- 2004-2005 - Sherra E. Kerns
- 2005-2006 - Ronald Barr
- 2006-2007 - David Wormley
- 2007-2008 - Jim Melsa
- 2008-2009 - Sarah Rajala
- 2009-2010 - J.P. Moshen
- 2010-2011 - Renata Engel
- 2011-2012 - Don Giddens
- 2012-2013 - Walter Buchanan
- 2013-2014 - Kenneth Galloway
- 2014-2015 - Nicholas Altiero
- 2015-2016 - Joe Rencis
- 2016-2017 - Louis Martin-Vega
- 2017-2018 - Bevlee Watford
- 2018-2019 - Stephanie Farrell
- 2019-2020 - Stephanie G. Adams
- 2020-2021 - Sheryl Sorby
- 2021-2022 - Adrienne Minerick
- 2022-2023 - Jenna Carpenter
- 2023-2024 - Doug Tougaw
- 2024-2025 - Grant Crawford
- 2025-2026 - Christi Luks

== Awards ==
ASEE annually recognizes the outstanding accomplishments of engineering and engineering technology educators through the ASEE awards program. By their commitment to their profession, desire to further the Society's mission, and participation in civic and community affairs, ASEE award winners exemplify the best in engineering and engineering technology education.

=== Current awards ===
- Frederick J. Berger Award
- Chester F. Carlson Award
- Frederick Emmons Terman Award
- Isadore T. Davis Award for Excellence in Collaboration of Engineering Education and Industry
- DuPont Minorities in Engineering Award
- John L. Imhoff Global Excellence Award for Industrial Engineering Education
- Sharon Keillor Award for Women in Engineering Education
- Benjamin Garver Lamme Award
- ASEE Lifetime Achievement Award in Engineering Education
- James H. McGraw Award
- Curtis W. McGraw Research Award
- Meriam / Wiley Distinguished Author Award
- Fred Merryfield Design Award
- National Engineering Economy Teaching Excellence Award
- National Outstanding Teaching Award
- Robert G. Quinn Award
- William Elgin Wickenden Award

=== Former awards ===
- George Westinghouse Award (1946-1999)

== Conferences ==
ASEE and its members organize a number of conferences, meetings, and workshops, foremost among them the ASEE Annual Conference. Other events include regional member meetings, professional-interest focused conferences, and K-12 teacher training.

== Fellowships ==
ASEE administers a number of fellowship and research opportunities with funding provided by federal agencies including the Department of Defense (DOD), NASA, and the National Science Foundation (NSF). These range from programs that provide summer internships for high school students to research programs for faculty members during the summer or while on sabbatical. Programs include undergraduate and graduate research support and postdoctoral research programs for recent PhDs at government and industrial research facilities. ASEE provides support tasks that include outreach and promotion activities, application processing support, application review activities, and administration of stipend and tuition payments for program participants.

== See also ==
- Ira Osborn Baker
