= American Institute for Medical and Biological Engineering =

Non-profit organization

- Founded: 1991; 35 years ago
- Founder: Robert M. Nerem
- Type: Professional Organization
- Purpose: Biomedical engineering, Biological engineering
- Location: Washington, D.C.
- Region served: United States
- Members: 50,000+
- Key people: Michael R. King, Ph.D., AIMBE President (2026-2028); Dawn Beraud, Ph.D., Executive Director
- Website: www.aimbe.org

The American Institute for Medical and Biological Engineering (AIMBE) is a non-profit organization founded in 1991, and headquartered in Washington, D.C. It represents 50,000 medical and biomedical engineers, and academic institutions, private industry, and professional engineering societies.

== College of Fellows ==
Since AIMBE's inception, over 2,500 individuals have been inducted to AIMBE's College of Fellows. These fellows include heads of medical and engineering schools. Some Fellows work for the government, acting as consultants, or directing clinical trials. Some Fellows are members of other prominent academic institutions, such as the National Academy of Engineering, Institute of Medicine and the National Academy of Sciences. Others have received the National Medal of Science and the National Medal of Technology. Fellows elect a Chair of the College of Fellows, who presides over the election and induction of the new class and the AIMBE Annual Event.

Fellows use the post-nominal FAIMBE.

== Industry Council ==
The Industry Council consists of corporate leaders in the biomedical engineering field.

== Partnership with FDA ==
AIMBE is one of many organizations that has a Network of Experts Agreement with the U.S. Food and Drug Administration (FDA).

It also partners with the FDA for its Scholars Program, which places post-doctorates in biomedical engineering fields in one-year positions at the FDA's Center for Devices and Radiological Health in Silver Spring, Maryland, at the agency's White Oak campus, to serve as expert advisors to agency staff.

== Notable Fellows ==
- David Baker, (2020)
- Frances H. Arnold, (2001)
- Chenzhong Li, (2017)
- Giorgio Carta, (2002)
- Rashid Bashir, (2010)
- Gilda A. Barabino, (2007) President 2016-2018
- Ravi V. Bellamkonda, (2006) President 2014-2016
- Emery N. Brown, (2006)
- Vince Calhoun, (2014)
- Ji-Xin Cheng, (2023)
- Shu Chien, Founding Fellow (1992), President 2000, Recipient of the 2004 Pierre Galletti Award
- Dorin Comaniciu, (2013)
- Cristina Davis, (2016)
- Tejal A. Desai, (2012), President 2020-2022
- Joseph DeSimone, (2007)
- Lola Eniola-Adefeso, (2017), President 2024-2026
- Anthony Guiseppi-Elie, (2006), Chair, 2017.
- Trey Ideker, (2014)
- Donald E. Ingber, (2011)
- Dean Kamen, (2012)
- Jeffrey Karp, (2013)
- Jay Keasling, (2000)
- Ali Khademhosseini, (2012)
- David Nelson Ku (1998)
- Robert S. Langer, Founding Fellow (1992), Chair, 1995, inaugural recipient of the Pierre Galletti Award,
- Cato T. Laurencin, (2000), Chair, 2008, recipient of the 2009 Pierre Galletti Award
- Martin P. Mintchev, (2007)
- Michael I. Miller, (1998)
- David J. Mooney, (2002), Chair, 2012
- Regina Murphy, (2008)
- Marjolein van der Meulen, (2008)
- Robert M. Nerem, Founding President, 1992, Recipient of the 2002 Pierre Galletti Award s
- Nicholas A. Peppas, Founding Fellow (1993), Chair, 2007, Recipient of the 2008 Pierre Galletti Award
- Shalini Prasad, (2022)
- Aliasger K. Salem, (2018)
- Pavlos Vlachos, (2022)
- James H-C. Wang, (2016)
- Anthony S. Weiss, (2013)
- Lakiesha Williams, (2020) for "outstanding contributions in traumatic brain injury research and for tireless advocacy of biomedical engineering to communities underrepresented in STEM."
- Joyce Wong, (2009), President 2022-2024
- Leslie Ying, (2019)
