= Giorgio Carta =

Giorgio Carta may refer to:

- Giorgio Carta (politician)
- Giorgio Carta (engineer)
