= James H-C. Wang =

Chinese American orthopedic biomechanist and academic

- Born: China
- Occupations: Orthopaedic biomechanist and academic

Academic background
- Education: B.S., Engineering Mechanics; M.S., Experimental Biomechanics; Ph.D., Bioengineering
- Alma mater: Tongji University; University of Cincinnati

James H-C. Wang is a Chinese American orthopedic biomechanist and academic. Currently, he is a Professor at the Departments of Orthopaedic Surgery, Bioengineering, and PM&R at the University of Pittsburgh. In addition, he is a Faculty Member at the McGowan Institute for Regenerative Medicine.

Wang is most known for his work on tissue biomechanics, tissue engineering, and cell mechanobiology.

Wang is a Fellow of the International Orthopaedic Research (FIOR), and American Institute for Medical and Biological Engineering (AIMBE).

== Education ==
Wang completed his Bachelor of Science in Engineering Mechanics in 1982 and Master of Science in Experimental Biomechanics in 1989 from Tongji University. Later in 1996, he obtained PhD in Bioengineering from the University of Cincinnati in the US.

== Career ==
In 1982, Wang joined Tongji University as an Assistant Instructor in the Department of Engineering Mechanics. After moving to USA, he finished his PhD at the University of Cincinnati and later completed postdoctoral training in Biomedical Engineering at Johns Hopkins School of Medicine and Washington University in St. Louis. After his postdoctoral training, he joined the University of Pittsburgh in 1998, where he was Assistant Professor at the Department of Orthopaedic Surgery from 1998 to 2005. Subsequently, he held the position of tenured Associate Professor at the Department of Orthopaedic Surgery and associate professor at the Departments of Bioengineering, Mechanical Engineering and Materials Science, and PM&R between 2005 and 2012. Since 2012, he has been serving as Professor at the Department of Orthopaedic Surgery and also Professor at the Departments of Bioengineering and PM&R.

In 2017, he was appointed Vice Chair of Research at the Department of Orthopaedic Surgery at the University of Pittsburgh. Since 2004, he has been the Director of the MechanoBiology Laboratory in the same department.

== Research ==
At the University of Pittsburgh, Wang has developed a research program in cell mechanobiology, which particularly focuses on the role of tendon cells in the development of tendinopathy. He has been consistently receiving substantial funding support from NIH and NSF. Additionally, he has been awarded research grants from DOD for several projects that aim to develop practical and clinically actionable strategies for the prevention and treatment of tendinopathy. He has authored numerous publications spanning the areas of tissue biomechanics, tissue engineering, and cell mechanobiology.

To understand the inflammatory and degenerative responses of tendon due to overuse injury, Wang's group has established a validated animal model of tendinopathy by using mouse treadmill running that mimic human tendinopathy development. Additionally, his work emphasized the role of HMGB1 as a pivotal molecule in mechanically induced tendinopathy and proposed glycyrrhizin and metformin as potential therapeutic agents to inhibit HMGB1 activity, thereby offering preventive and treatment options for tendinopathy.

Wang's research team has also worked on the identification and characterization of tendon stem cells (TSCs) in humans, mice, rats, and rabbits. Wang's tendon stem cell research has focused on the effects of different mechanical loading conditions on TSC growth and differentiation. Focusing on TSCs, his work highlighted the role of TSC mechanobiology in tendon homeostasis as well as the development of degenerative tendinopathy. His group showed that in normal conditions, the multi-differentiation potential of TSCs allows these stem cells to differentiate into tenocytes; however, under high stress and injurious conditions TSCs can undergo aberrant differentiation into adipocytes, chondrocytes, and osteocytes. Wang's team has established the beneficial effects of modest exercise on tendons via moderate treadmill running by the virtue of its effect in enhancing the function of TSCs resulting in the formation of normal-like tendon tissue at the site of injury. In their examination of treatment options for tendon injuries, his group has provided insights into the application of biologics such as PRP for the effective treatment of tendon injuries.

Wang also focuses his research on tissue engineering. His approach to regenerate tendons after injury includes the use of PRP. His group showed that PRP with minimal leukocytes, known as pure-PRP (P-PRP), induces TSC differentiation into active tenocytes. These tenocytes produce abundant collagens, enabling P-PRP to effectively repair tendon injuries. His team demonstrated that the combined application of kartogenin and PRP effectively enhanced the formation of a fibrocartilage region connecting the tendon graft and bone interface, thereby improving the biomechanical strength of the tendon-bone junction.

== Awards and honors ==
- 1990 – Award of Science and Technology, Tongji University
- 2001 – Hulda Irene Duggan Arthritis Investigator
- 2020 – J. Leonard Goldner Award, American Orthopaedic Foot and Ankle Society

== Selected articles ==
- Wang, JH-C. Substrate deformation determines actin cytoskeleton reorganization: A mathematical modeling and experimental study. J theor Biol. 202: 33–41, 2000.
- Wang, JH-C.; Goldschmidt-Clermont, P.; Yin, FC-P. Contractility and reactive oxygen species affect actin cytoskeleton remodeling of the endothelial cell to mechanical stretching. Ann Biomed Eng 28: 1165–1171, 2000.
- Wang, JH-C.; Jia, F.; Gilbert, TW.; Woo, SL-Y. Cell orientation determines the alignment of cell-produced collagenous matrix. J Biomech 36:97–102, 2003.
- Wang, JH-C. Mechanobiology of tendon, J Biomech. 39:1563–1582, 2006.
- Wang, JH-C.; Thampatty, B.P. An introductory review of cell mechanobiology, Biomech Model Mechanobiol. 1–16, 2006.
- Li, F.; Wang, JH-C.; Wang, Q.M. Monitoring cell adhesion by using thickness shear mode acoustic wave sensors. Biosensors and Bioelectronics 23(1): 42–50, 2007
- Zhang, J.; Wang, JH-C. Characterization of differential properties of rabbit tendon stem cells and tenocytes. BMC Musculoskeletal Disorders 11:10, 2010.
- Zhang, J.; Wang, JH-C. Platelet-rich plasma releasate promotes differentiation of tendon stem cells into active tenocytes. Am J Sports Med 38: 2477–2486, 2010.
- Zhang, J.; Middleton, K.K.; Fu, F.H.; Im, H-J.; Wang, JH-C. HGF mediates the anti-inflammatory effects of PRP on injured tendons. PloS ONE 8(6): e67303, 2013.
