= Shalini Prasad =

Indian bioengineer

Shalini Prasad is an India-born biological engineer, Cecil H. and Ida Green Professor of Systems Biology Science, and head of the Bioengineering Department at The University of Texas at Dallas. She was elected to the American Institute for Medical and Biological Engineering College of Fellows in February 2022 "for pioneering contributions in engineering sweat wearables for disease tracking and management for chronic diseases and prognostic monitoring in pandemics." Shalini Prasad has held faculty positions at several universities and is a co-founder of a technology company called EnLiSense LLC.

== Biography ==
At the University of Madras, India, Shalini Prasad obtained her bachelor's degree of Electronics and Communications Engineering. She then obtained her Ph.D. in Electrical Engineering at the University of California, Riverside.

=== Career ===
She was an assistant professor at Portland State University from January 2005 to August 2008 and at Arizona State University from August 2008 to August 2010. She served as an associate professor at Wichita State University from August 2010 to August 2011. She currently works at the University of Texas, Dallas as a professor and has worked there since August 2011.

Shalini Prasad has published articles about her research in the National Library of Medicine. Some of her work includes detecting THC from saliva, being able to monitor patients with brain injuries, and being able to determine blood alcohol levels through sweat. Some of her more recent articles from 2023 consist of the development of a wearable device to monitor chronic diseases, as well as being able to detect electrochemical biomolecules through Transition Metal Dichalcogenides.

=== Research ===
In 2017, Prasad led a team of bioengineers to create a device that could detect elevated blood-sugar from sweat. In 2020, she led a study to develop an assay that could be used to detect and measure the concentration of THC from cannabis in saliva. In 2021, Prasad developed a biosensor, which uses the same technology as the sweat analysis device from 2017, with the addition that the device could detect cortisol.

Prasad's research has included developing a sensor that monitor's patients after suffering a Traumatic Brain Injury by monitoring their sweat. This sensor works by monitoring two specific proteins called GFAP and IL-6. In addition, Prasad's research includes monitoring the neurotransmitter called acetylcholine in the nervous system, which helps monitor many types of brain diseases that could afflict patients.

=== Entrepreneurship ===
In 2014, Shalini Prasad and Sriram Muthukumar co-founded the company EnLiSense LLC, which develops biosensors such as their EnLiSense sensor technology. EnLiSense LLC has developed a wearable bracelet-like device that monitors an individual’s alcohol consumption by monitoring their sweat. Ethyl Glucuronide, as well as Ethanol, are substances found in alcohol and are monitored by this device. The wearable device makes direct contact with the skin, and when the user sweats, the device analyses how much alcohol the user has consumed and will send the results to the user's smartphone.
