= Aliasger K. Salem =

Pharmaceutical sciences researcher

- Born: East Midlands, England
- Education: University of Nottingham; Johns Hopkins School of Medicine
- Known for: Controlled drug delivery, nanoparticles, microfabrication, chips, vaccines and tissue engineering
- Scientific career
- Fields: Pharmacy
- Workplaces: University of Iowa

Aliasger K. Salem is the Senior Associate Vice President for Research at the University of Iowa and Bighley Chair and Professor of Pharmaceutical Sciences at the University of Iowa College of Pharmacy. Salem's academic appointment at the University of Iowa is based in the College of Pharmacy, with additional secondary appointments in the College of Dentistry, Department of Chemical and Biochemical Engineering, Department of Biomedical Engineering, Department of Chemistry, and the Holden Comprehensive Cancer Center. Prior to joining the University of Iowa in 2004, he was a postdoctoral fellow at the Johns Hopkins School of Medicine and completed his PhD at the School of Pharmacy and Pharmaceutical Sciences at the University of Nottingham in the UK.

Salem was an American Cancer Society Research Scholar from 2009 to 2013. Salem led the Experimental Therapeutics (ET) program at the Holden Comprehensive Cancer Center from 2012 to 2024 and serves as Director of the Nanotoxicology Core at the Environmental Health Sciences Research Center. Aliasger Salem was the associate editor for The AAPS Journal - The official journal of the American Association for Pharmaceutical Scientists (Springer-Nature) from 2014 to 2023 and is an editorial board member for a number of other journals including The AAPS Journal and the International Journal of Pharmaceutics (Elsevier). Aliasger Salem has been or is a member of a number of grant review study sections including panels for the American Cancer Society, the National Institutes of Health, the National Science Foundation, and the Department of Defense (DoD): Congressionally Directed Medical Research Programs (CDMRP) Prostate and Breast Cancer Research Programs.

Salem has received a number of teaching awards including a Council of Teaching Instructional Improvement Award in 2008 and a Collegiate Teacher of the Year award in 2012.

Salem's research interests include nanotechnology, microfabrication, particle and drug delivery systems, implantable chips, the design of gene delivery systems, regenerative medicine, and the development of vaccines.

== Selected honors and awards ==
- 2026 Controlled Release Society Samyang Award
- 2026 National Academy of Inventors Chapter of Excellence Award
- 2025 Regents Award for Faculty Excellence
- 2024 The Medicine Maker: Listed in Top 30 Most Influential People in the Pharma Industry
- 2024 Elected Fellow, National Academy of Inventors
- 2023 Elected to Board of Directors, American Association for Pharmaceutical Scientists
- 2023 Elected Fellow, Controlled Release Society
- 2021 Elected Fellow, American Association for the Advancement of Science
- 2020 Hancher-Finkbine Medallion
- 2020 Leadership in Research Award, Office of the Vice President for Research, University of Iowa
- 2018 Elected Fellow, American Institute for Medical and Biological Engineering
- 2017 Elected Fellow, American Association for Pharmaceutical Scientists
- 2017 Lyle and Sharon Bighley Chair and Professor of Pharmaceutical Sciences
- 2014 Associate editor, The AAPS Journal - The Official Journal of the American Association for Pharmaceutical Scientists (Springer-Nature)
- 2013 Lyle and Sharon Bighley Endowed Professor of Pharmaceutical Sciences
- 2009 American Cancer Society Research Scholar Award
- 2005 The Pharmaceutical Research and Manufacturers of America Foundation Award
