= Joyce Wong =

American engineer and professor

Joyce Yun-Wei Wong
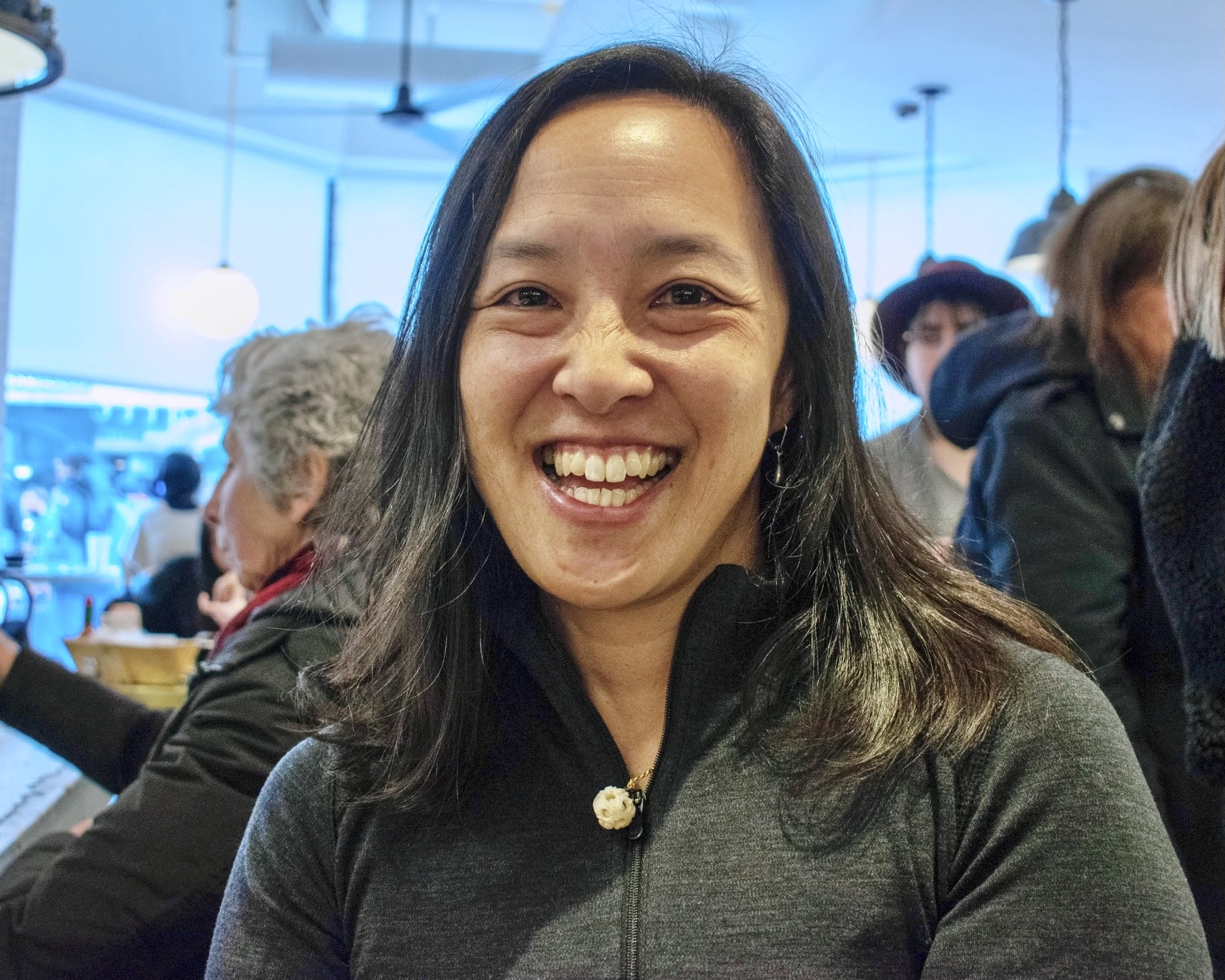
- Wong in 2019
- Education: Massachusetts Institute of Technology
- Scientific career
- Fields: Materials science; Biomedical engineering
- Workplaces: University of California, Santa Barbara; Boston University
- Thesis: Electrically conducting polymers for non-invasive control of mammal cell behavior (1994)
- Doctoral advisor: Robert S. Langer
- Website: people.bu.edu/wonglab

Joyce Yun-Wei Wong is an American engineer who is Professor of Biomedical Engineering and Materials Science and Engineering at Boston University. Her research develops novel biomaterials for the early detection treatment of disease. Wong is the Inaugural Director of the Provost's Initiative to promote gender equality and inclusion in STEM at all levels: Advance, Recruit, Retain and Organize Women in STEM. She is a Fellow of the American Association for the Advancement of Science, American Institute for Medical and Biological Engineering and Biomedical Engineering Society.

== Education and early career ==
Wong studied materials science and engineering at the Massachusetts Institute of Technology. Wong is an accomplished cellist – in 1984 she was a finalist in the Seventeen Magazine & General Motors National Concerto Competition, and during her undergraduate and graduate career was a member of the MIT Chamber Music Society. As an undergraduate at MIT she was a General Motors Women's Club scholar, a Uniroyal National Merit Scholar and Tau Beta Pi society member. She graduated in 1988, before beginning a PhD (Materials Science & Engineering) in the Program for Polymer Science and Technology as an IBM graduate research fellow, working with Robert S. Langer. She earned her PhD from Massachusetts Institute of Technology in 1994.

Wong was appointed a National Institutes of Health postdoctoral fellow at University of California, Santa Barbara working under Jacob N. Israelachvili. Her doctoral research investigated electrically conducting polymers, identifying that they can be used as a culture substrate to modulate the shape and growth of mammalian cells. In her postdoctoral training, to mimic biological ligand - receptor interactions, Wong studied the interactions between polymer-tethered ligands and receptors using surface forces apparatus. She also developed polymer cushioned bilayers as model cell membrane systems and characterized their biophysical properties using the surface forces apparatus and neutron reflectometry.

== Career ==
Wong joined Boston University as a Clare Boothe Luce Assistant Professor in 1998, Faculty of the College of Engineering in the Department of Biomedical Engineering and later in the Division of Materials Science and Engineering. She is a faculty mentor in training programs in the College of Arts and Sciences and the BU School of Medicine. She develops biomaterials that can interact with living cells, interrogating biocompatibility and cell behaviour. She was promoted to Professor in 2013.

Wong's research focuses on developing biomaterials for the early detection and treatment of disease. She is interested in understanding how the physical cellular environment determines cell behavior by developing substrata with features that can imitate pathophysiological and physiological environments. This approach includes studying cell behaviours such as directed cell migration, which she first began in cardiovascular cells and later expanded to include metastatic cancer cells. Her recent research in this area has been focused on combining the understanding of factors that control cardiovascular cell behavior with micropatterned cell sheet technology to develop surgical solutions for paediatric patients with congenital heart defects.

Wong has also developed microfluidic processing methods to create fibers of the biopolymer silk and has recently been focusing on developing protein alloy fibers. Using tools developed to describe the silk's structure and drawing on her musical training, Wong enlisted composer John MacDonald (Tufts University), who translated the structure of different silk protein fragment sequences into a series of musical compositions for flute.

Wong's most recent work has been developing targeted ultrasound and magnetic resonance (MR) contrast agents for the early detection of disease. Her MR contrast agent studies grew out of her work using nanotechnology to develop contrast agents to enhance oil recovery. She is currently conducting pre-clinical studies of targeted ultrasound contrast agents in collaboration with Nanovalent Pharmaceuticals to detect and treat surgical adhesions.

=== Academic service ===
Wong served on the Executive Board of the Biomedical Engineering Society from 2011 to 2014. In 2011, she served as the first woman Chair of the Gordon Research Conference on Biomaterials & Tissue Engineering – a conference that began in 1966 as the Science and Technology of Biomaterials. An informal brainstorming session of women at this meeting led to a social media group formed by Laura Suggs (UT Austin) with the aim of creating a network to connect women faculty in Biomedical Engineering. Wong is the lead editor of Biomaterials: Principles and Practices. From 2016-2018 she served as co-chair of AIMBE Women; in 2016 conference co-chair of the 90th American Chemical Society's Colloid and Surface Science Symposium; and in 2017 as a Volume Organizer of the Materials Research Society's (MRS) MRS Bulletin. From 2022-2024 she served as president of AIMBE. She is on the editorial board of several journals and is Associate Editor (the Americas) for the journal Drug Delivery and Translational Research. In 2018 she was elected to the Council of the Tissue Engineering Regenerative Medicine International Society (TERMIS) - North America.

At Boston University, Wong is the Inaugural Director of the Provost's Initiative to promote gender equality and inclusion in STEM at all levels: Advance, Recruit, Retain and Organize Women in STEM (ARROWS). The program advocates for women in STEM at all career stages, from early school education to K–12 and academia. It works on both the Charles River and Boston University School of Medicine campuses.

In 2016, Wong – together with Julie Chen and Paula Rayman of U Mass Lowell – approached the AAAS with an idea for the STEM Equity Achievement (SEA) Change Awards for diversity, equity and inclusion in higher-ed institutions, which, as of 2018, is in the bronze pilot stage. The idea was inspired by the Athena SWAN program in the UK and the National Science Foundation ADVANCE program.

=== Awards and honours ===
- 2000 National Science Foundation CAREER Awards
- 2001 Invited Participant National Academy of Science Frontiers in Engineering
- 2001 Boston University Provost Innovation Award
- 2004 DuPont Young Professor Award
- 2008 Boston University Distinguished Faculty Fellow Award
- 2009 Hartwell Individual Biomedical Engineering Award
- 2009 Vice-Chair of Gordon Research Conference in Biomaterials and Tissue Engineering
- 2009 Fellow of the American Institute for Medical and Biological Engineering*2011 Chair of Gordon Research Conference in Biomaterials and Tissue Engineering*2012 Boston University Collaborator of the Year Award
- 2012 Kern Faculty Fellow
- 2013 Fellow of the Biomedical Engineering Society*2014 Boston University Inaugural Term Distinguished Professor of Engineering
- 2017 Boston University Charles DeLisi Distinguished Lecture
- 2017 Fellow of the American Association for the Advancement of Science
- 2018 Boston University GWISE (Graduate Women in Science and Engineering) Advocate of the Year Award
