= Martin P. Mintchev =

Bulgarian American engineer and surgeon

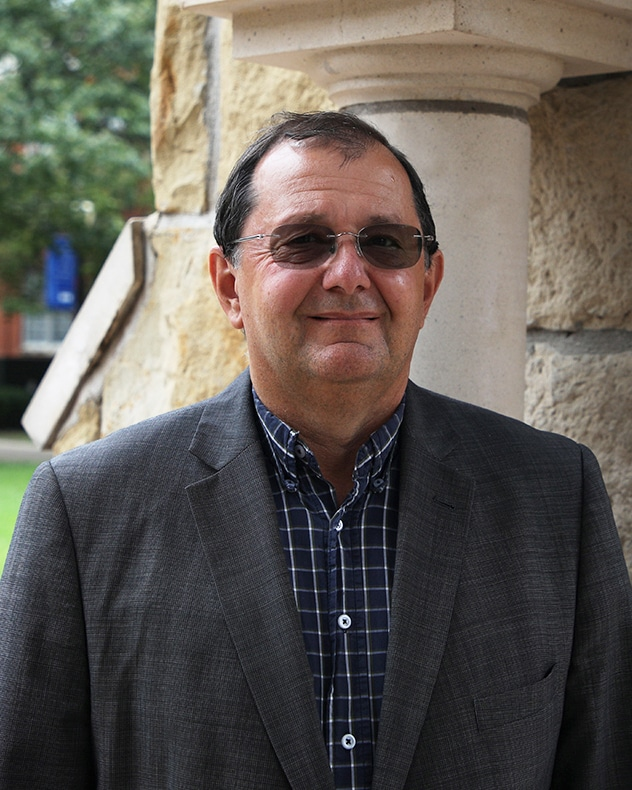
- Education: Technical University of Sofia; University of Alberta
- Awards: Distinguished Lecturer IEEE 2010; Fellow of the American Institute for Medical and Biological Engineering 2007; Teaching Excellence University of Calgary 1998; ESS Professor of the Year University of Calgary 1997; Whitaker Foundation Chair in Biomedical Engineering 1997
- Scientific career
- Workplaces: Howard Payne University; University of Calgary; University of Alberta; Technical University of Sofia

Martin Pavlov Mintchev (Bulgarian: Мартин Павлов Минчев) is a Bulgarian American engineer, entrepreneur, academic, and experimental surgeon.

== Early life and education ==
Mintchev was born in Sofia, Bulgaria and received his M.Sc. in Electronics from the Technical University of Sofia in 1987 with a specialization in Medical and Nuclear Electronics. In 1990, he was supported by the British Council on an invitation by Professor David L. Wingate to work as visiting scholar in his Gastrointestinal Science Research Unit of the Royal London Hospital (now Wingate Neurogastroenterology Institute at Queen Mary University of London). Later in 1990 he applied for and received graduate scholarship from the University of Alberta in Canada, and in January 1991 started his Ph.D. studies in electrical engineering there under the joint supervision of Professors Y. J. Kingma (Department of Electrical Engineering) and K. L. Bowes (Department of Surgery). In 1994, Mintchev obtained his Ph.D. in electrical engineering from the University of Alberta. In the same year he completed his training as a post-doctoral fellow in experimental surgery at the Surgical Medical Research Institute in Edmonton, Canada under the supervision of Kenneth L. Bowes. In 1997, Mintchev received his Professional Engineer registration from the Association of Professional Engineers and Geoscientists of Alberta.

== Career ==
In 1995, Mintchev became assistant professor at the University of Alberta in Edmonton, Canada, with a joint appointment in the Departments of Electrical Engineering and Surgery. In 1997 he won the Whitaker Foundation Chair position in Biomedical Engineering at the University of Calgary, where he worked as full tenured professor for 25 years, and is currently Professor Emeritus. In 2013-2014 he was first-tier professor at the Free University of Bozen-Bolzano in South Tyrol, Italy, where he lectured in Computer architecture and Embedded systems. In 2020 he became professor and chair of Engineering at Howard Payne University in Texas, where he re-organized the existing Engineering science program, and established two new Bachelor of Science programs in Software Engineering and Biomedical Engineering. He is also President and Chief executive officer of EatLittle Inc., and Adjunct professor of Experimental surgery at the University of Alberta in Edmonton, Canada.

In 2007, Mintchev was elected Fellow of the American Institute for Medical and Biological Engineering, Washington, DC. He is a Senior Member of IEEE, member of the American Gastroenterological Association, Distinguished Lecturer of IEEE (2010–2011), and a registered Professional engineer (APEGA and NSPE). He has been external reviewer of several university textbooks on microelectronic circuits and biomedical signal processing, as well as for several professional societies, including IEEE, AGA, SPE, and BMES.

In 2004 and 2006 Mintchev served as external reviewer for two of the most comprehensive books on Bulgarian history written by the Oxford University's Professor Richard J. Crampton.

== Research and development ==
Mintchev is the author of hundreds of articles in leading international scientific journals and conferences, and of dozens of patented inventions in the fields of biomedicine, electronics, intelligent microsystems, inertial navigation, computer and software engineering, and Internet of Things. His scientific publications reach Hirsch index > 35, i-10 index > 95 and over 4000 external citations. He is the creator of the concepts of Enhanced Electrogastrography, Controlled Pseudobezoar technology for the treatment of obesity, Leakless Pipes, Microanimal Farming, Wearable Antiviral Garments, and other technological innovations. He has been president, director, Chief executive officer and Chief scientific officer of public and private companies. He and his students have been featured by many TV and news stations, including CTV, CBC, Yahoo News, Associated Press, KTAB-TV, and more. Articles about his scientific developments have been published in many newspapers and magazines, including Los Angeles Times, TechCrunch, Huffington Post, Smithsonian Magazine, Hazardous Materials Management Magazine, IEEE Spectrum, etc. Mintchev has been a strong advocate of experiential learning in engineering education by the early engagement of undergraduate university students in major research and development projects, keeping them interested and engaged up to graduation and beyond.

== Awards and recognition ==
- 1997 Junior Whitaker Foundation Chair in Biomedical Instrumentation
- 1997 Engineering Student Society Professor of the Year Award, University of Calgary
- 1998 Student Union Teaching Excellence Award, University of Calgary
- 2007 Fellow of the American Institute for Medical and Biological Engineering
- 2010 Distinguished Lecturer, IEEE
