= Regina Murphy =

American chemical engineer

- Awards: Presidential Young Investigator Award (1990)

Academic background
- Education: BS, Chemical Engineering, 1978, PhD, Chemical Engineering, 1989, Massachusetts Institute of Technology School of Engineering
- Thesis: Antigen-antibody complexes: size, conformation, and reactivity with protein A (1989)

Academic work
- Institutions: University of Wisconsin–Madison; Chevron Richmond Refinery

Regina Mary Murphy is an American chemical engineer. She is the Robert Byron Bird Department Chair in Chemical and Biological Engineering at the University of Wisconsin–Madison. In 2010, Murphy was elected a Fellow of the American Institute for Medical and Biological Engineering for "pioneering discoveries on protein aggregation in neurodegenerative disease."

== Early life and education ==
Murphy earned her Bachelor of Science degree and PhD at the Massachusetts Institute of Technology School of Engineering. During her time as an undergraduate student, she played varsity softball. After completing her undergraduate degree in 1978, Murphy worked for five years at the Chevron Richmond Refinery before returning to MIT for her PhD in chemical engineering.

== Career ==
Upon completing her PhD, Murphy joined the department of chemical engineering at University of Wisconsin–Madison in 1989. During her early tenure at the institution, she was one of the recipients of the 1990 Presidential Young Investigator Award. In the later 1990s, Murphy collaborated with Laura L. Kiessling to disrupt the aggregation of proteins that form the poisonous plaque deposits found in the brains of Alzheimer’s patients. They did this by synthesizing specific inhibitor molecules that could bind to the beta-amyloid protein and thus prevent it from forming the toxic aggregates. During this time, she also redesigned the department’s introductory courses, Chemical Process Calculations and Process Synthesis, and also developed a textbook to accompany them.

As a result of her academic accomplishments, Murphy received the 1998 Jordi Folch-Pi Award from the American Society for Neurochemistry and was awarded a 1999 Romnes Fellowship. Following this, Murphy was appointed the Harvey D. Spangler Chair of chemical engineering and was promoted to full professor. Her contributions to teaching, research and service were recognized in 2006 by the university. and she received a Distinguished Teaching Award in 2008.

In 2009, Murphy began to study the way transthyretin provides protection how it affects people with Alzheimer’s. In 2010, Murphy was elected a Fellow of the American Institute for Medical and Biological Engineering for "pioneering discoveries on protein aggregation in neurodegenerative disease." Following this, she was the recipient of a 2016 Vilas Faculty Mid-Career Investigator Award. In February 2019, Murphy became the inaugural holder of the Robert Byron Bird Department Chair in Chemical and Biological Engineering.

After 34 years, Murphy retired from the Department of Chemical and Biological Engineering at the University of Wisconsin-Madison. She leaves the department with a legacy as the first female faculty hire and first female chair of the department.
