= Anthony Guiseppi-Elie =

Dr. Anthony Guiseppi-Elie
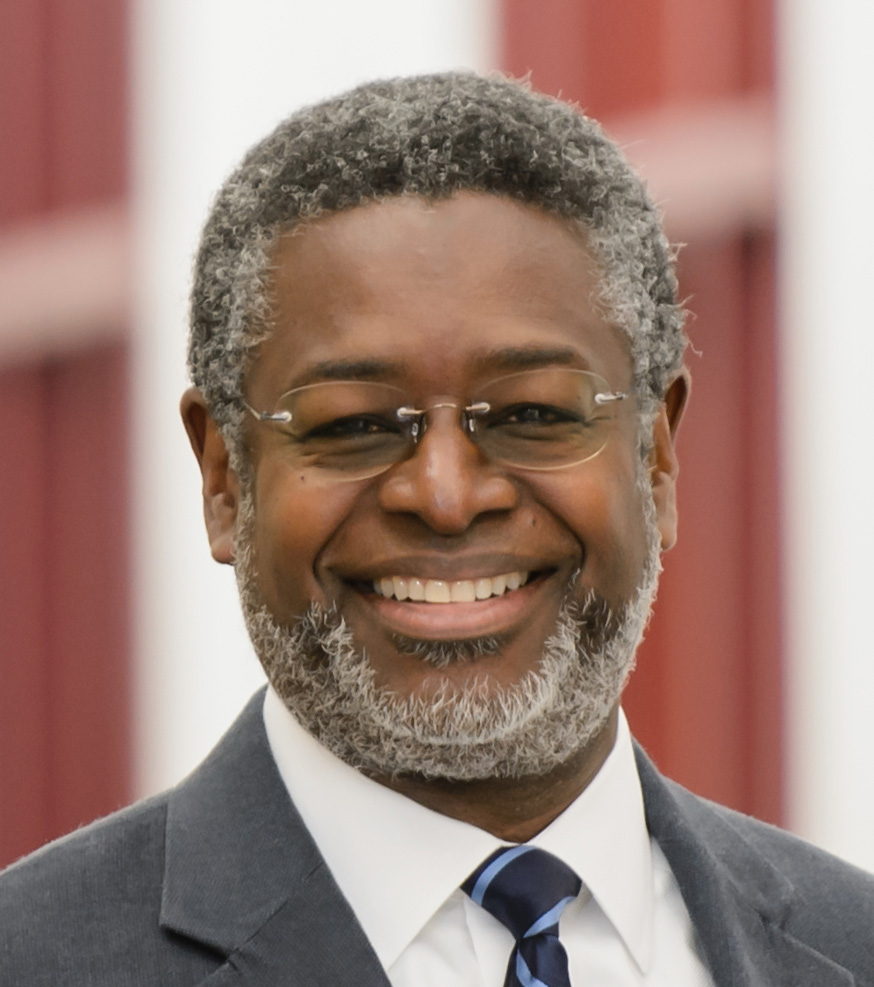
- Born: October 8, 1954 (age 71); Trinidad and Tobago
- Education: Massachusetts Institute of Technology (MIT) - Sc.D. and Postdoctoral Fellow, University of Manchester Institute of Science and Technology (UMIST) - M.Sc., University of West Indies - B.Sc. (First Class Honors)
- Spouse: Annette Guiseppi-Elie
- Children: Adilah Guiseppi-Wilson
- Scientific career
- Fields: Bioelectronics, Biochips, Nano and Microfabrication, BioMEMs, Bioanalytical Microsystems, Electomics
- Workplaces: Tri-County Technical College, Anderson University, Texas A&M University, Clemson University, Virginia Commonwealth University, Johns Hopkins University, ABTECH Scientific, Inc., Molecular Electronics Corporation, W.R. Grace and Co

Anthony "Tony" Guiseppi-Elie is a Trinidad-born, American scientist, chemical and bioengineer, entrepreneur. He is the President and Sr. Fellow of the American International Institute of Medical Sciences, Engineering and Innovation and the President and Scientific director of ABTECH Scientific, Inc. He is noted for his research and commercial development of biologically inspired and chemically responsive electroconductive hydrogels. Guiseppi-Elie is the Founding Editor-in-Chief of Bioengineering, a transdisciplinary journal from the controversial publisher MDPI.

He is a co-founder of the convergent academic program in engineering and medicine (School of ENMED) at Texas A&M University. He is also the Founding Dean of the convergent liberal-arts and engineering programs of the College of Engineering at Anderson University (South Carolina).

== Life and education ==
Guiseppi-Elie was born and raised in Trinidad and Tobago. He is an alumnus of North Eastern College in Sangre Grande.

He earned a B.Sc. with triple majors in applied chemistry, analytical chemistry, and biochemistry from the University of the West Indies (UWI). He was awarded a Commonwealth Scholarship and a UWI Scholarship to attend the University of Manchester Institute of Science and Technology (UMIST), where he earned the M.Sc. in chemical engineering with a focus on corrosion science and engineering. He earned his Sc.D. in materials science and engineering from the Massachusetts Institute of Technology, where he also completed a postdoctoral fellowship.

Guiseppi-Elie and his wife have one daughter.

== Career ==
Following his graduate studies, where he focused on under-film corrosion protection by coatings for his M.Sc. and on the Synthesis and Characterization of Polyacetylene for his Sc.D., Dr. Anthony Guiseppi-Elie's career initially concentrated on chemical engineering and materials science and engineering. He spent the first fifteen years of his professional life in industrial research and product development, contributing to various organizations ranging from large corporations to startups. His corporate affiliations included W. R. Grace and Co., Molecular Electronics Corporation, Allage Associates Inc., AAI-ABTECH, and ABTECH Scientific, Inc.

Dr. Guiseppi-Elie then transitioned into academia, spending the next eighteen years as a tenured, titled, and endowed full professor at several universities, including Virginia Commonwealth University (VCU), Clemson University, Texas A&M University (TAMU), and Anderson University (South Carolina) (AUSC). At VCU, he served as a full professor of Chemical and Life Sciences Engineering and Emergency Medicine. He was also the director of a pioneering Department of Defense, Commonwealth of Virginia, and industry-supported transdisciplinary center that specialized in microfabricated DNA and protein biochips and diagnostic biosensors.

His tenure at Clemson University saw him occupy the role of Dow Chemical Professor in Chemical and Biomolecular Engineering. He was also a professor of Bioengineering and Electrical and Computer Engineering and led the center focusing on biosensors, bioelectronics, and nano-biotechnology. At TAMU, Dr. Guiseppi-Elie held the TEES Research Professorship in Engineering, was the head of the Department of Biomedical Engineering, and served as the founding associate dean of engineering innovation in the College of Engineering. He co-founded the School of Engineering Medicine and was a founding member of the Texas A&M Academy of Physician-Scientists. At Anderson University, he was the university distinguished professor, vice president of industry relations, and founding dean of the college of engineering.

Most recently, he served as the vice president of academic affairs and the chief academic officer at Tri-County Technical College. Alongside his academic career, Dr. Guiseppi-Elie has been involved with three startup companies and is the Founder, President, and Scientific Director of ABTECH Scientific, Inc.

== Personal life ==
Guiseppi-Elie is a Wikipedia editor in his free time, though most of his contributions consist of developing his personal Wikipedia page.

== Awards and honors ==
In 2016, he was named the chair-elect of the American Institute for Medical and Biological Engineering (AIMBE) and served as the convening chair of the College of Fellows from 2017 to 2018. He was inducted as a fellow into AIMBE in 2006. He was elected Fellow of the Biomedical Engineering Society (FBMES) in 2020, recognizing his contributions to engineering-medicine and implantable microsystems. In 2016, he was elected as a Fellow of the Institute of Electrical and Electronics Engineers (IEEE) Engineering in Medicine and Biology Society (FIEEE) for his contributions to organic electronic materials in biotechnology and biomedicine. He was elected as a Fellow of the Royal Society of Chemistry (FRSC) in 2014, for his contributions at the interface of chemistry, materials chemistry, nano-science, and biotechnology. He became a Fellow of the American Institute for Medical and Biological Engineering (FAIMBE) in 2006 for his work on bio-smart materials based on electroconductive hydrogels. He is a Life Member of the American Institute of Chemical Engineers (AIChE) and Sigma Xi. He was appointed as a Fulbright Specialist (2014-2019) by the U.S. Department of State's Bureau of Educational and Cultural Affairs (ECA) in the Fulbright Program and World Learning. He served as an IEEE-EMBS Distinguished Lecturer from 2012 to 2013. He acted as the Convening Chair of the annual international Biomedical Engineering and Instrumentation conferences in Boston, Massachusetts, USA (2019, 2020, 2021, 2023, 2024). He was invited as a Distinguished Faculty Presenter at the NSF Bio-X Summer School and Advanced Institute, Orthodox Academy of Crete, Kolympari, Chania, Crete, Greece in 2019 and 2023.

== Selected publications ==
- Walther, B. K., Pandian, N. K. R., Gold, K. A., Kiliҫ, E. S., Sama, V., Gu, J., Gaharwar, A. K., Guiseppi-Elie, A., Cooke, J. P., & Jain, A. (2021). "Mechanotransduction-on-chip: vessel-chip model of endothelial YAP mechanobiology reveals matrix stiffness impedes shear response." Lab on a Chip, 21, 1738-1751. DOI:10.1039/D0LC01283A (IF=6.914).
- Aggas, J. R., Walther, B. K., Abasi, S., Kotanen, C. N., Karunwi, O., Wilson, A. M., & Guiseppi-Elie, A. (2021). "On the Intersection of Molecular Bioelectronics and Biosensors: 20 Years of C3B." Biosensors and Bioelectronics, 176, 112889. DOI:10.1016/j.bios.2020.112889 (IF=10.257).
- Bhat, A., Podstawczyk, D., Walther, B. K., Aggas, J. R., Machado-Aranda, D., Ward, K. R., & Guiseppi-Elie, A. (2020). "Toward a Hemorrhagic Trauma Severity Score: Fusing Five Physiological Biomarkers." Journal of Translational Medicine, 18, 348. DOI:10.1186/s12967-020-02516-4 (IF= 4.200).
- Walther, B. K., Dinu, C. Z., Guldi, D. M., Sergeyev, V. G., Creager, S. E., Cooke, J. P., & Guiseppi-Elie, A. (2020). "Nanobiosensing with Graphene and Carbon Quantum Dots: Recent Advances." Materials Today, 39, 23-36. DOI:10.1016/j.mattod.2020.04.008 (IF=24.372).
- Aggas, J. R., Sánchez-Sinencio, E., & Guiseppi-Elie, A. (2020). "Wien Oscillator Using Organic Enzyme-Chemiresistors for Fused Measurement of Glucose and Lactate." Advanced Intelligent Systems, DOI:10.1002/aisy.202000004.
- Abasi, S., Aggas, J. R., Venkatesh, N., Vallavanatt, I., & Guiseppi-Elie, A. (2020). "Design, Fabrication and Testing of an Electrical Cell Stimulation and Recording Apparatus (ECSARA) for Cells in Electroculture." Biosensors and Bioelectronics, DOI: 10.1016/j.bios.2019.111793.
