= Tony Turner (scientist) =

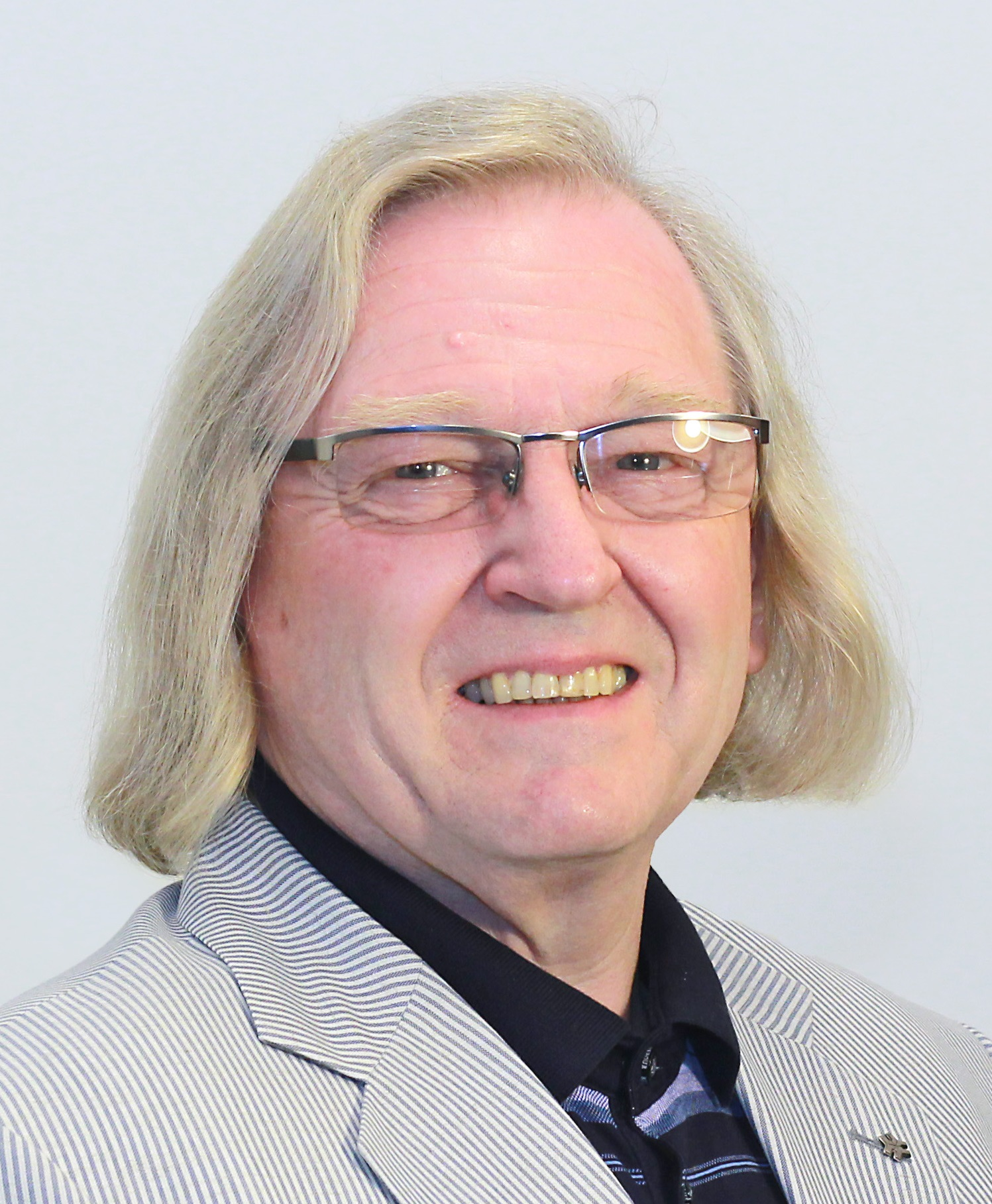
- Born: Anthony Peter Francis Turner
- Scientific career
- Fields: Biosensors
- Workplaces: Cranfield University

Professor Anthony Peter Francis Turner, FRSC, usually known as Tony Turner, is a British academic specialising in the fields of biosensors and bioelectronics.

== Biography ==
Professor Anthony (Tony) Turner is an Emeritus Professor of Cranfield University in England, where he was previously the Distinguished Professor of Biotechnology (until 2010) and Principal of Cranfield University at Silsoe. He remained Innovations Director for Cranfield Ventures Ltd (until 2014), with responsibility for licensing and spin offs from Cranfield University. He joined Linköping University (Sweden) in 2010, to help re-establish the university in the field of Biosensors and Bioelectronics, but retired the end of 2018 to focus on translational research and technology transfer in the Skåne region of Southern Sweden. He finally retired completely from working life in July 2021.

In 1996, he was elected Fellow of the Royal Society of Chemistry, which awarded him the Theophilus Redwood Medal in 2011 for his outstanding contribution to analytical science and especially for "his pioneering work which has led to the development of home blood glucose monitoring technology". He received a higher doctorate from the University of Kent at Canterbury in 2001 for his "outstanding contribution to biosensors" and was presented with an honorary doctorate for his "contribution to higher education" by Bedfordshire University in 2008. He was elected as a Foreign Associate of the National Academy of Engineering in the USA, in 2006, for his exceptional contribution to "glucose sensors, environmental monitors and synthetic recognition molecules" and elected to the Royal Swedish Academy of Engineering Sciences (IVA) in 2013. In 2016, he was awarded the Ukraine’s highest academic distinction, the Vernadsky Gold Medal from the National Academy of Sciences of Ukraine, for his "outstanding achievements in the field of bioelectronics", and in the same year, the Datta Medal by the Federation of European Biochemical Societies.

He helped found the UK’s first Biotechnology Centre in 1981 at Cranfield University. There he led the Biosensors Group that went on to develop, in collaboration with Oxford University, a biosensor that transformed the lives of people with diabetes. The principle they established, of using a mediator in a disposable electrochemical glucose biosensor, became the technology of choice for this US$15 billion a year industry. He played a major role in consolidating the field of biosensors as an academic discipline by co-founding the Journal of Biosensors (Elsevier) in 1985 (renamed the Journal of Biosensors and Bioelectronics in 1991), publishing the first text book on Biosensors in 1987 and establishing the World Congress on Biosensors in 1990. He edited Biosensors and Bioelectronics until 2019 (and remains Founding Editor-In-Chief) and was Executive Chair of the World Congress until 2021. His team has been ranked in the top ten in the world for biosensor development by a variety of international commentators. In academic circles, his name is synonymous with the field of Biosensors, but he has also specialised in leveraging IP and driven numerous biosensor start-ups over the past four decades.

== Publications ==
Professor Turner has over 750 publications and patents in the field of biosensors and biomimetic sensors and a G.S. (2026) h-index of 101, with his most popular paper receiving 2,854 citations.
