= Cristina Davis =

American mechanical engineer

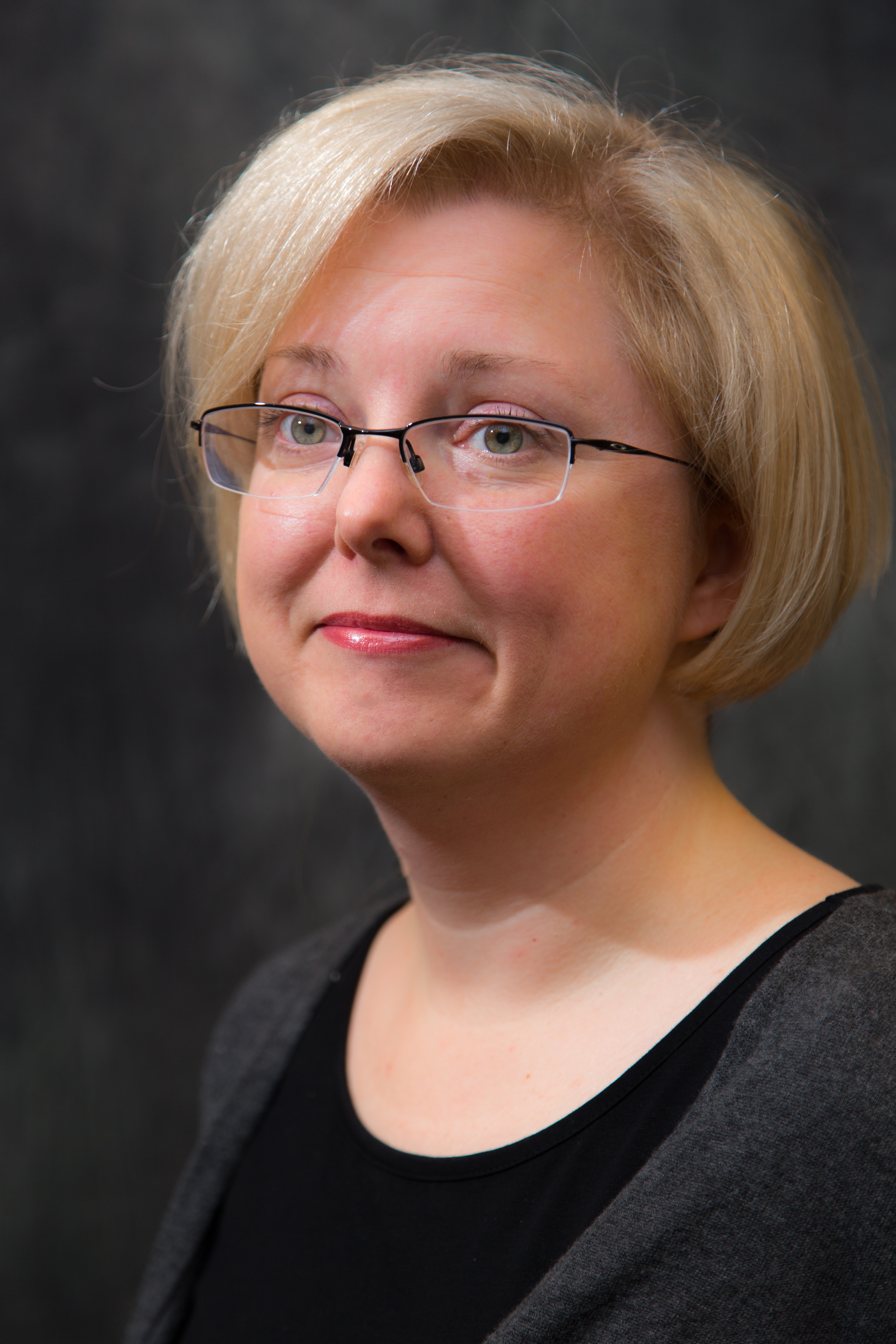
Cristina Davis (2015)

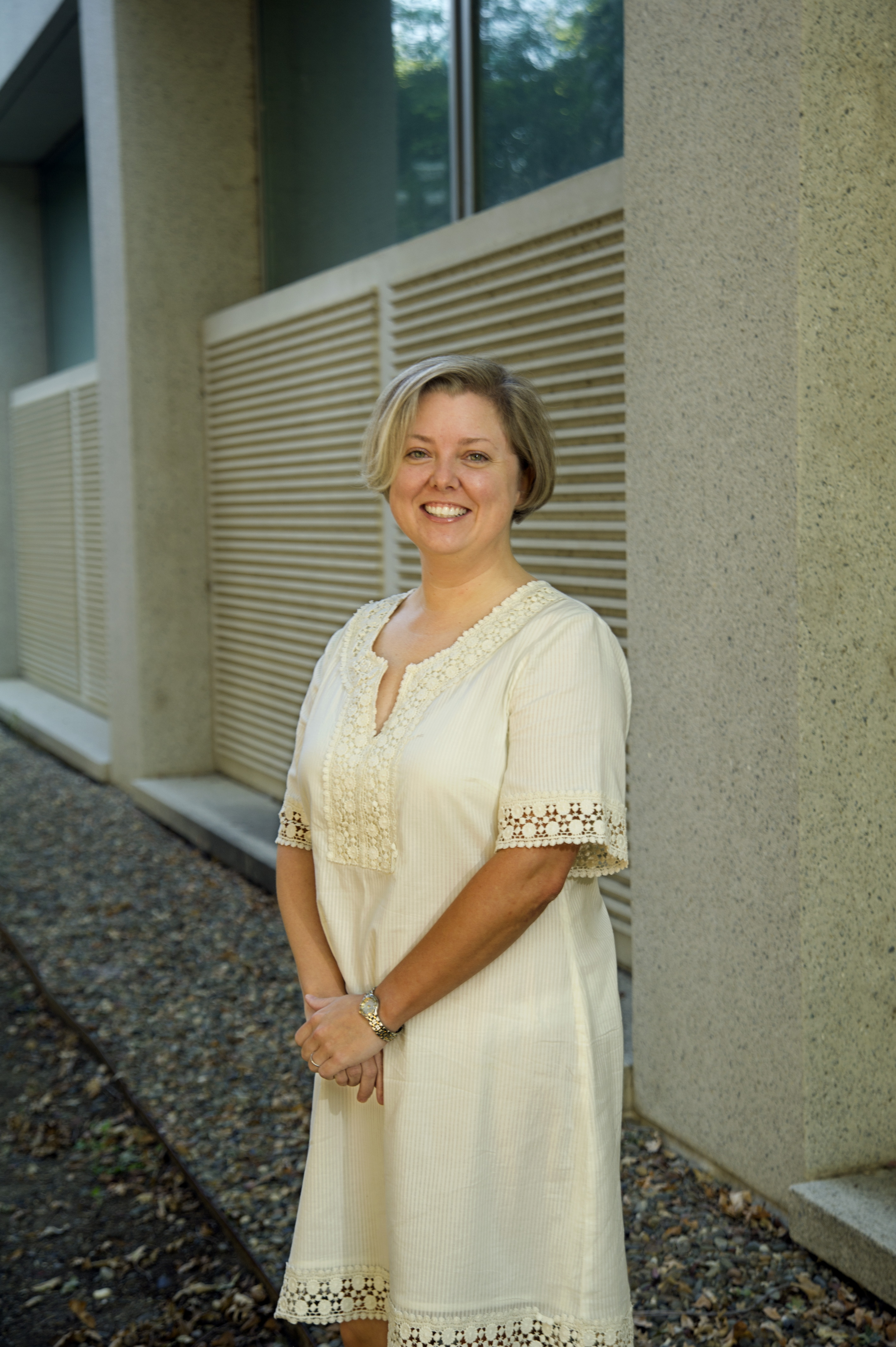
Cristina Davis (2001)

Cristina E. Davis is a mechanical engineer at the University of California, Davis. She is a professor in the Department of Mechanical and Aerospace Engineering, where she heads the Bioinstrumentation and BioMEMS Laboratory, and the university's Associate Vice Chancellor of Interdisciplinary Research and Strategic Initiatives. Her research interests include sensors for biomarkers and trace chemicals, and micro-electromechanical systems for biochemical applications.

== Education and career ==
Davis was a double major in mathematics and biology at Duke University, where she graduated in 1994. She completed a Ph.D. in biomedical engineering in 1999 at the University of Virginia.

From 1999 to 2005, Davis was a postdoctoral researcher at Johns Hopkins University, a visiting scientist at the École Polytechnique Fédérale de Lausanne in Switzerland, a senior scientist at Molecular Devices Corporation in Switzerland, and a researcher, technical staff member, and group leader at the Draper Laboratory in Massachusetts.

She joined the University of California, Davis as an assistant professor in the Department of Mechanical and Aerospace Engineering in 2005. She was promoted to associate professor in 2010 and full professor in 2012. She chaired the Department of Mechanical and Aerospace Engineering and held the Warren and Leta Geidt Endowed Professorship from 2019 to 2021, was Associate Dean for Research in the College of Engineering from 2021 to 2022, and became Associate Vice Chancellor for Interdisciplinary Research and Strategic Initiatives in 2022.

In 2025, Davis collaborated with pulmonology researchers at the University of California, Davis to develop methods for collecting and analyzing exhaled breath condensate. In this work, participants exhale through a dry-ice-cooled glass tube that condenses microscopic particles from breath, allowing researchers to collect samples for chemical and biological analysis. The non-invasive technique has been used to build “breath libraries” to study respiratory conditions. This study has made major strides to investigate how lifestyle factors, including smoking and vaping, alter respiratory biology.

== Recognition ==
Davis was named to the American Institute for Medical and Biological Engineering College of Fellows in 2016, "for outstanding contributions to non-invasive chemical and biological sensing tools, algorithms, and applications". In 2019, she was named as a Fellow of the American Association for the Advancement of Science and of the National Academy of Inventors.
