= Robert M. Nerem =

American biomedical engineer (1937–2020)

Robert Michael Nerem, often referred to as Bob Nerem, a member of the U. S. National Academy of Engineering and the Institute of Medicine, held the Parker H. Petit Distinguished Chair for Engineering in Medicine and Institute Professor Emeritus at the Georgia Institute of Technology where he was an Emeritus Professor until his death.

== Biography ==
Nerem was born on July 20, 1937, and died March 7, 2020. He received his B.S. from the University of Oklahoma in 1959, his M.Sc. from Ohio State University in 1961 and his Ph.D. from the same university in 1964. He joined the faculty at Ohio State in the department of aeronautical and astronautical engineering, being promoted to professor in 1972 and serving from 1975 to 1979 as associate dean for research in the graduate school. From 1979 to 1986 he was professor and chairman of the department of mechanical engineering at the University of Houston.

== Career ==
Nerem joined Georgia Tech in 1987 as the Parker H. Petit Distinguished Chair for Engineering in Medicine. He also was associate director of the NSF Science and Technology Center for the Emergent Behavior of Integrated Cellular Systems, Director of the Georgia Tech/Emory Center (GTEC) for Regenerative Medicine and from 1995 to 2009 was the founding director of the Parker H. Petit Institute for Bioengineering and Bioscience, an interdisciplinary organization for biochemistry, bioengineering, and biology .

He was technical editor of the ASME Journal of Biomechanical Engineering from 1988 to 1997.

== Leadership ==
He was president of the International Federation of Medical and Biological Engineering from 1988 to 1991, of the International Union for Physical and Engineering Sciences in Medicine from 1991 to 1994, and of the Tissue Engineering Society International (now the Tissue Engineering and Regenerative Medicine International Society) from 2002 to 2004. He was chairman of the U.S. National Committee on Biomechanics (1988–91), and is a Fellow and was the founding president (1992-1994) of the American Institute of Medical and Biological Engineering He was a part-time senior advisor for bioengineering in the National Institute for Biomedical Imaging and Bioengineering at the National Institutes of Health (2003-2006).

== Research and publications ==
His research interests included biomechanics, cardiovascular devices, cellular engineering, vascular biology, and tissue engineering and regenerative medicine. He is the author of more than 200 publications in refereed articles and 84 publications in book chapters and non-refereed articles, and of two patents.

Nerem's work on "Molecular cloning and characterization of the constitutive bovine aortic endothelial cell nitric oxide synthesis" was published in 1992 in the Journal of Clinical Investigation and has been cited by 671 works in refereed articles. This article details the relationship between endothelial cell nitric oxide synthase (NOS) and vascular homeostasis. He is also most notable for his research on shear stress, which was published in 1985 in the Journal of Biomedical Engineering and has been cited by 512 papers in refereed articles. A complete list of Professor Nerem's published work can be found on his Google Scholar Citations page.

His most notable works published from 2007 - 2013 include "Human Mesenchymal Stem Cells Form Multicellular Structures in Response to Applied Cyclic Strain" published in 2009 in the Annals of Biomedical Engineering;"Bone Marrow Derived Mesenchymal Stem Cells Promote Angiogenic Processes in a Time and Dose Dependent Manner InVitro" published in 2009 in the Journal of Tissue Engineering Part A; and lastly, "Discovery of Shear- and Side-specific mRNAs and miRNAs in Human Aortic Valvular Cells," published in 2010 in AJP Heart and Circulatory Physiology

== Awards ==
He is a Fellow of the American Association for the Advancement of Science; of the Council of Arteriosclerosis, American Heart Association the American Physical Society, and the American Society of Mechanical Engineers

In 1989 he received the H.R. Lissner Award from ASME and in 2002 the Pierre Galletti Award from AIMBE.

In 1988 he was elected to the National Academy of Engineering (NAE), and he served on its Council from 1998 to 2004). In 1992 he was elected to the Institute of Medicine of the National Academy of Sciences and in 1998 a Fellow of the American Academy of Arts and Sciences. In 1994, he was elected a Foreign Member of the Polish Academy of Sciences and in 1998 he was made an Honorary Fellow of the Institution of Mechanical Engineers in the United Kingdom. In 1994, he was also honored with the Robert Henry Thurston Lecture Award from the American Society of Mechanical Engineers. In 2004 he was elected an honorary foreign member of the Japan Society for Medical and Biological Engineering, and in 2006 a Foreign Member of the Swedish Royal Academy of Engineering Sciences. In 2008 he was selected by NAE for the Founders Award.

He holds honorary doctorates from the University of Paris, Imperial College London, and Illinois Institute of Technology.
