= Chenzhong Li =

Chinese-born American biomedical engineer

- 李晨钟
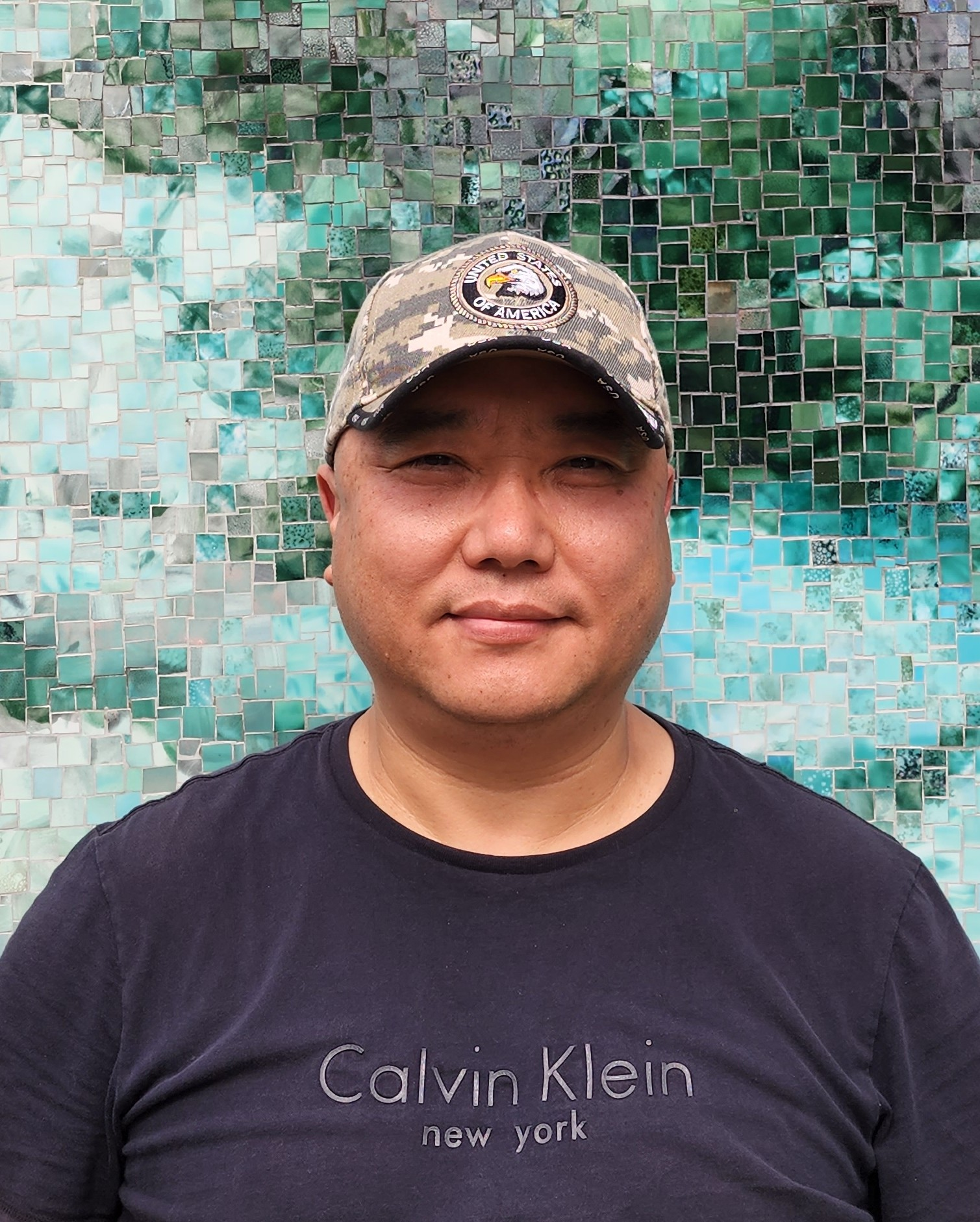
- Born: Shanxi, China
- Education: Kumamoto University/University of British Columbia
- Known for: Scientist / Inventors / Editor-in-Chief Biosensor and Bioelectronics
- Scientific career
- Fields: Biosensor; bioelectronics; point-of-care testings; theranostics; biomedical engineering; analytical chemistry; nanotechnology; lab-on-a-chip
- Institutions: Tulane University (2021–present); Florida International University (2006–2021); National Science Foundation (2017–2019); National Research Council of Canada (2004–2006)

Chenzhong Li (Chinese: 李晨钟) is a Chinese-born Canadian & American biomedical engineer, chemist, inventor, professor, and journal editor. Li is the co-Editor-in-Chief of the journal Biosensors and Bioelectronics (Elsevier) and the associate editors of journals RESEARCH (AAAS) and Biosensors (MDPI).

== Education ==
Li received his bachelor's in Chemical Engineering in China, and both master (in Electrochemistry) and PhD degree (Bioengineering) from Kumamoto University in Japan, respectively in 1996 and 2000. He did postdoc training at University of British Columbia and University of Saskatchewan.

== Research career ==
Li was a research officer at the Biotechnology Research Institute, The National Research Council Canada (NRC), Montreal until 2006. He was an assistant professor at Florida International University, Miami since 2006 and a tenured associate professor, a World Ahead full professor until 2021. Li is the director of Nanobioengineering/Bioelectronics Core in the Department of Biomedical Engineering of Florida International University.

Li is also the former Program Director in the Chemical, Bioengineering, Environmental and Transport Systems (CBET) Division of National Science Foundation. to oversee biosensors and biomedical devices research and manage grants for hundreds of research projects nationwide

Li is an expert in bioinstrumentation, specifically in the development of biomedical devices for both diagnostic and therapeutic, which could also have cross-applications for environmental, food safety monitoring, agriculture, and homeland security. Li's research interests include biosensors, Point Care of Testings, cell/tissue electronics, neuron-device interface, cell/organ on a chip, electric therapy, as well as electron transfer study of various synthetic biomaterials.

The impact of his work by 2022 is documented in 17 granted patents, about 160 journal papers, and three startup companies since 1993, in China, Canada and the United States. The research of graphene based biosensor conducted by Li has opened a new direction for nanobiosensor development. Li's research has been featured on multiple public medica including NPR's Out to Lunch “SCIENCE” show. The show can be found online at

== Awards and honors ==
Li is a recipient of Monbukagakusho Scholarship (1995-2000) and the Japan Society for the Promotion of Science (JSPS)Professorship Award(2014-2015).

In recognition of his work, Li has received several awards and honors including the Kauffman Entrepreneurship Professor Award in 2009 and 2011, the 2013 FIU Collage of Engineering and Computing Outstanding Faculty Award in Research, 2014 Excellent FIU Faculty Award in Research and Creative Activities, 2016 Pioneer in Technology Development Award by the Society of Braining Mapping, 2016 the Finalist for FIU President's Council Worlds Ahead Professor Award, 2016 Minority-Serving Institution Faculty Award in Cancer Research, by American Association for Cancer Research (AACR), and 2019 IEEE Distinguished Lecturer award.

Li is the elected fellow of the American Institute for Medical and Biological Engineering(AIMBE). In 2021, he was elected a fellow member of National Academy of Inventors (NAI), the highest professional distinction accorded solely to academic inventors, for his contributions to the development of biosensors for cancer, neurological diseases and infectious disease diagnosis. Li is the vice-chair of the Gordon Research Conference on Bioanalytical Sensors in 2022 and the chair in 2024.
