= Ji-Xin Cheng =

Academic, inventor, and entrepreneur

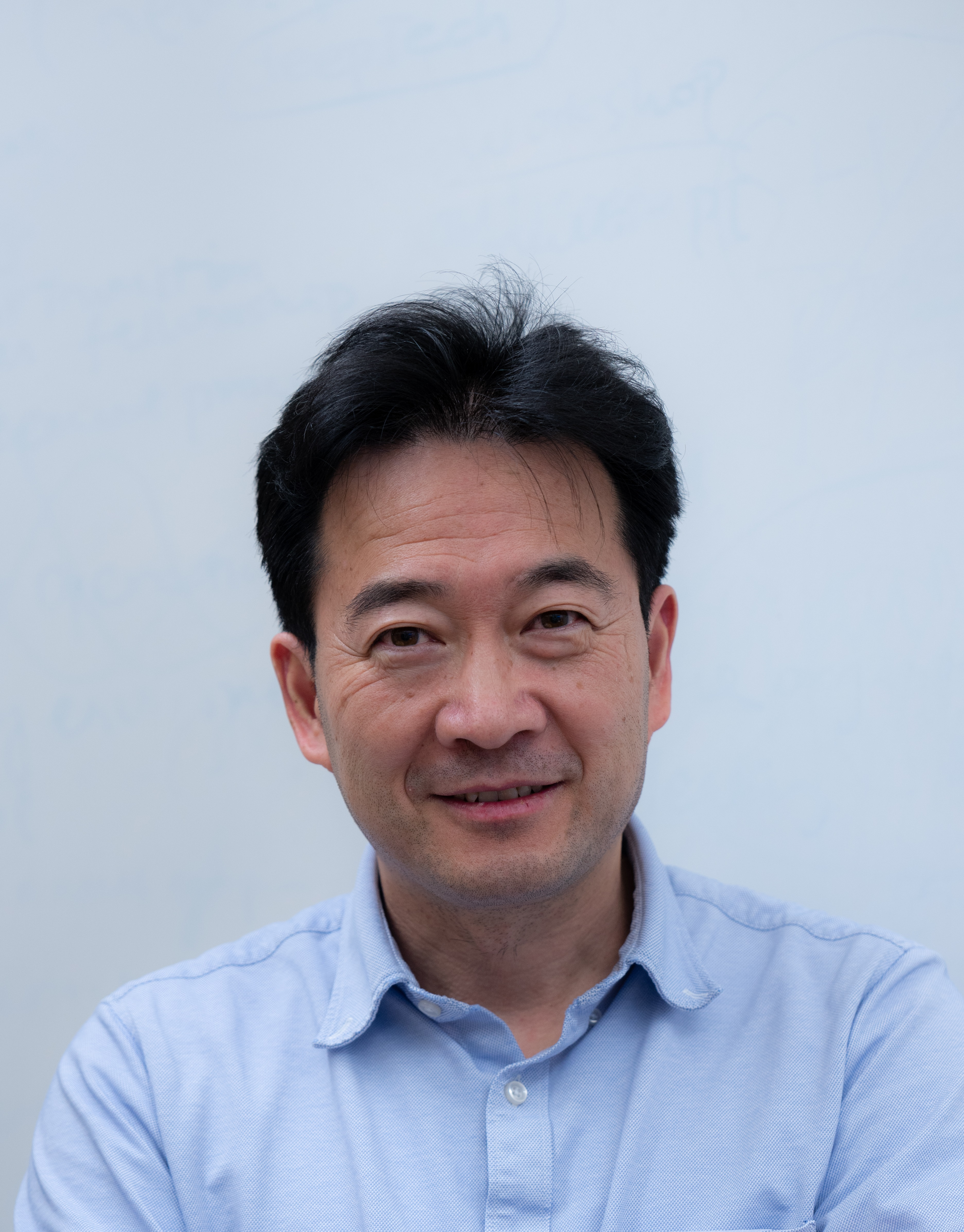
- Education: Bachelor of Science; Doctor of Philosophy
- Alma mater: University of Science and Technology of China (B.S. in 1994, PhD in 1998)
- Known for: Chemical imaging
- Scientific career
- Fields: Biophotonics
- Workplaces: Boston University (2017–present); Purdue University (2003–2017)
- Thesis: Bond-selective Chemistry: from Local Mode Vibration to Optimal Control of Molecular Dynamics by Laser
- Doctoral advisor: Qingshi Zhu

Ji-Xin Cheng is an academic, inventor, and entrepreneur. He holds the Moustakas Chair Professorship in Optoelectronics and Photonics at Boston University. His inventions span optical imaging, cancer diagnosis, neuromodulation, and phototherapy of infectious diseases. He holds positions of co-founder of Vibronic and of Pulsethera. He is also the scientific advisor of Photothermal Spectroscopy and Axorus.

Cheng is most known for his development of chemical imaging techniques, focusing on molecular spectroscopic imaging in technology development, life science applications, and clinical translation. His work has been recognized by the 2019 Ellis R. Lippincott Award from Optica, the 2020 Pittsburgh Spectroscopy Award from the Spectroscopy Society of Pittsburgh, and the 2024 SPIE Biophotonics Technology Innovator Award from International Society for Optics and Photonics.

Cheng is a Fellow of Optica (the Optical Society of America) and the American Institute for Medical and Biological Engineering.

== Education ==
Cheng obtained a Bachelor of Science degree from the University of Science and Technology of China in 1994. Later, he obtained a PhD in 1998 from the same institution. After completing his PhD, Cheng had one-year postdoc training at the University of Science and Technology of Hong Kong (1999). From 2000 to 2003, he joined Sunney Xie's lab at Harvard University as a postdoc, where he and others worked on the development of coherent anti-Stokes Raman scattering (CARS) microscopy.

== Career ==
In 2003, he joined Purdue University as assistant professor in the Weldon School of Biomedical Engineering and Department of Chemistry. He was promoted to associate professor in 2009 and to professor in 2013. In 2017, he was recruited to Boston University as the inaugural Moustakas Chair Professor in Optoelectronics and Photonics in the Departments of Electrical and Computer Engineering and Biomedical Engineering.

Since 2021, he has served as the director of the Boston University Photonics Center Graduate Student Initiative.

Cheng has co-founded companies, including Vibronix, in 2014, and Pulsethera, in 2019. He holds the position of scientific advisor at Photothermal Spectroscopy Corp. in Santa Barbara, California, and at Axorus in Paris.

== Research ==
Cheng has authored 300+ peer-reviewed publications spanning the areas of coherent Raman microscopy, mid-infrared photothermal microscopy, transient absorption microscopy, electromagnetic and ultrasound waves for neutral modulation, phototherapy of infectious diseases, as well as medical applications of nanomaterials.

=== Coherent Raman scattering microscopy ===
Cheng's research has focused on coherent anti-Stokes Raman scattering (CARS) microscopy across various aspects such as instrumentation, theory, and practical applications. His research introduced concepts like CARS microscope using picosecond excitation, epi-detected CARS, and polarization-sensitive CARS. In 2002, he created a Green's function model that elucidates the contrast mechanism in CARS microscopy. Additionally, he led the development of laser-scanning CARS integrated into a confocal microscope. At Purdue University, his group led the development of multimodal nonlinear optical imaging using a CARS microscope.

From 2013 onward, Cheng and his research team devised methods that allow for the rapid acquisition of Raman spectra at microsecond time scale per pixel, facilitating vibrational spectroscopic imaging of live organisms. One notable achievement includes the creation of a tuned amplifier array, which enabled the development of the speediest Raman spectroscopic imaging system, capable of capturing a Raman spectrum in just 5 microseconds. His team further developed frameworks for transforming hyperspectral data into chemical maps of prominent substances. Through vibrational spectroscopic imaging on human patient samples, Cheng and his collaborators identified cholesteryl ester as a pervasive metabolic indicator of highly malignant cancers.

=== Overtone photoacoustic microscopy ===
In 2011, Cheng and coworkers introduced overtone photoacoustic microscopy, which combined optical excitation of overtone vibration and acoustic detection of pressure transients to enable label-free bond-selective imaging of deep tissues. In collaboration with Professor Michael Sturek at the Indiana University School of Medicine, his team developed intravascular vibration-based photoacoustic catheters that can perform video rate imaging of lipids in an arterial wall. In 2014, he co-founded Vibronix aiming to further develop vibrational imaging technologies into commercial microscopes and medical devices. In 2020, Vibronix received FDA approval for their first medical device, AcuSee, for ultrasound image-guided surgical removal of kidney stones.

=== Mid-infrared photothermal (MIP) microscopy ===
In 2016, his team introduced a mid-infrared photothermal (MIP) imaging technique that overcame the limitations of traditional infrared spectroscopic imaging, achieving micromolar detection sensitivity and submicrometer spatial resolution for three-dimensional chemical imaging of live cells and organisms. Concentrating on optical photothermal IR imaging, his research group have made contributions to technology advancement through a series of innovations. These innovations encompass widefield MIP, optical phase detection, and fluorescence detection. His recent invention, single pulse digitization, has facilitated real-time super-resolution infrared chemical imaging of living organisms at video rate. In 2024, his group reported in Nature Methods a mid-infrared photothermal reporter for imaging enzymatic activities in live cells.

In 2017, Photothermal Spectroscopy, with Cheng as a Scientific Advisor, announced mIRage, a commercial microscope for mid-infrared photothermal imaging.

=== Transient absorption microscopy ===
In addition to his research on bond-selective chemical imaging, Cheng also made advancements in the field of high-resolution and high-speed transient absorption (TA) microscopy. In 2013, his team pioneered far-field super-resolution transient absorption imaging, breaking the conventional diffraction limit by achieving a spatial resolution of 200 nm through controlled electronic absorption saturation. On the applications of TA spectroscopic imaging, his team was the first to use phase-sensitive TA imaging to distinguish metallic from semiconducting carbon nanotubes. They also tracked single-walled carbon nanotubes in living cells using this method. In 2019, they developed a technique combining TA spectroscopic imaging and phasor analysis to quantify HbA1c levels within individual red blood cells. His group also unveiled a metabolic shift in melanoma from pigment-rich to lipid-rich as it progresses from primary to metastatic stages, potentially advancing the detection and treatment of this aggressive skin cancer.

=== Neuromodulation with electromagnetic and ultrasound waves ===
Beyond Chemical Imaging, Cheng's research revolves around developing a set of tools designed to control cellular activity using electromagnetic or ultrasound waves. His group created a fiber optoacoustic emitter that transforms laser pulses into an extremely focused ultrasound field at the tip of the fiber, enabling precise stimulation of neurons at submillimeter accuracy and single-cell stimulation using a tapered fiber setup. His team further expanded on their work to create a non-invasive brain modulation technique using optically generated focused ultrasound with extremely precise spatial targeting. Additionally, he and coworkers created a microwave split ring resonator to generate gap-based ultrasound. This device enables precise neural activity inhibition beyond the microwave's diffraction limit.

=== Phototherapy of infectious diseases ===
Under a lab-built transient absorption microscope, Cheng and his student Pu-Ting Dong accidentally found fast photobleaching of staphyloxanthin, a chromophore in methicillin-resistant S. aureus (MRSA). He converted this failed imaging experiment into a therapy for the super-bug MRSA by synergizing the pigment photobleaching with hydrogen peroxide and conventional antibiotics. Cheng, along with his coworkers, further discovered that certain wavelengths of light can deactivate natural light-absorbing molecules in a broad spectrum of bacteria and fungi, enabling the development of a therapy that sensitizes drug-resistant infections to low levels of hydrogen peroxide.

=== Nanomedicine ===
In his early career, Cheng explored medical applications of nanomaterials including gold nanorods and polymer micelles. His 2005 paper in PNAS indicates that gold nanorods, when excited at 830 nm, exhibit strong two-photon luminescence with polarization dependence, plasmon-enhanced absorption, and higher signal intensity than traditional fluorescent probes, making them promising candidates for in vivo imaging applications.

In 2007, Cheng and collaborators investigated the photothermal effects of gold nanorods on tumor cells and established that plasmon-resonant gold nanorods, with carefully modified surface chemistry, have the potential for use in image-guided therapies based on localized hyperthermia at low laser fluences. His 2009 work highlighted the versatility of gold nanorods in the biomedical field, emphasizing their unique optical properties, surface chemistry control, and potential for both imaging and therapeutic applications, particularly in the context of cancer treatment. In 2010, his team described in Nature Nanotechnology a membrane repair property of block co-polymer micelles and showed its effectiveness in repairing traumatic spinal cord injury.

== Selected awards and honors ==
- 2005 – Seed of Success, Purdue University
- 2010 – Translational Research Award, Wallace H. Coulter Foundation
- 2011 – Early Career Research Award, Purdue University College of Engineering
- 2015 – Craver Award, Coblentz Society
- 2016 – Purdue University Cancer Center Research Excellence Award
- 2016 – Research Award, Purdue University College of Engineering
- 2018 – Translational research award, International Society for Optics and Photonics
- 2019 – Ellis R. Lippincott Award from OSA, Society for Applied Spectroscopy
- 2020 – Microscopy Today Innovation Award, Microscopy Today
- 2020 – Pittsburgh Spectroscopy Award, the Spectroscopy Society of Pittsburgh
- 2022 – Boston University Innovator of the Year, Boston University
- 2024 – SPIE Biophotonics Technology Innovator Award, International Society for Optics and Photonics
- 2024 – Charles Delisi Award, Boston University College of Engineering

== Bibliography ==
=== Books ===
- Mathematical Competition of Modelling (1996)
- Coherent Raman Scattering Microscopy (2012) ISBN 9781439867655
- Stimulated Raman Scattering Microscopy: Techniques and Applications (2021) ISBN 9780323851589
