= Pavlos Vlachos =

Greek-American engineer, scientist, academic, and entrepreneur

Pavlos P. Vlachos
- Occupations: Mechanical engineer, academic and entrepreneur
- Awards: Fellow of the American Society of Mechanical Engineers; Fellow, American Institute for Medical and Biological Engineering; Dean's Award of Excellence, Virginia Tech; NSF CAREER 2006; Moody Award, ASME Division of Fluids Engineering

Academic background
- Education: B.S., Mechanical Engineering; M.S., Engineering Mechanics; Ph.D., Engineering Mechanics
- Alma mater: National Technical University of Athens; Virginia Tech

Academic work
- Institutions: Purdue University
- Website: https://vlachosresearch.org

Pavlos P. Vlachos is a Greek-American engineer, scientist, academic, and entrepreneur. He is professor in Purdue's School of Mechanical Engineering and in the Weldon School of Biomedical Engineering, and the St. Vincent Health Professor of Healthcare Engineering. He serves as the Director for the Purdue Regenstrief Center for Healthcare Engineering (RCHE).

Vlachos's research spans the fields of fluid mechanics, biomedical engineering, and measurement sciences. His research addresses translational and clinical research leading to technologies that reach medical practice, and measurement and data science in physical systems.

Vlachos is a Fellow of the American Society of Mechanical Engineers (ASME), and American Institute for Medical and Biological Engineering (AIMBE).

== Education ==
Vlachos received his Bachelor's degree in Mechanical Engineering from National Technical University of Athens in 1995. He then enrolled at Virginia Tech, and earned his Master's and Doctoral degrees in Engineering Mechanics in 1998 and 2000, respectively.

== Career ==
Following his Doctoral degree, Vlachos held part-time appointments at Virginia Tech as a Visiting Assistant Professor from 2000 till 2002, and as a Research Assistant Professor in Engineering Science and Mechanics Department from 2002 till 2003. In 2003, he held concurrent appointments as Assistant Professor of Mechanical Engineering, and as Core Faculty in the School of Biomedical Engineering and Sciences. He was promoted to Associate Professor of Mechanical Engineering in 2007, and to Professor in 2011. Between 2011 and 2013, he also served there as John R. Jones Faculty Fellow, and as a Robert E. Hord Professor in Mechanical Engineering Department at Virginia Tech. In 2013 he joined the School of Mechanical Engineering at Purdue. He served as President's Fellow for Research Development. From 2006 till 2015, he was an Adjunct Faculty at Wake Forest School of Medicine. During his tenure at Purdue University, he also held several concurrent appointments at Virginia Tech. He was appointed as an Affiliate Faculty in the Department of Engineering Sciences and Mechanics from 2004 to 2016, and as an Affiliate Professor in the School of Biomedical Engineering and Sciences, and in Mechanical Engineering Department from 2013 till 2016. In the fall of 2021, he was appointed as the St. Vincent Health Professor of Healthcare Engineering.

He is a Founder and CEO of Cordian Technologies Inc.

== Research ==
Vlachos has published over 160 journal and 129 peer-reviewed conference papers, and has had 8 patents awarded. His research is focused in experimental fluid mechanics with an emphasis on interdisciplinary measurement science, especially at the intersection of mechanics with biological, biomedical, and clinical systems. He has made scientific and engineering contributions to the quantification of uncertainty in complex measurement systems, and his discoveries and innovations have led to new understanding and technologies for heart failure, cardiovascular diseases, and tissue biotransport with applications to oncology, drug delivery, and injection biomechanics, as well as discoveries on how animals and micro-organisms interact with their fluid environment.

A Fellow of ASME (2021) and AIMBE (2022), he has received 8 best-paper awards, 3 journal covers, including one in the Proceedings of the National Academies of Science, and the 2009 and 2010 outstanding paper awards in fluid mechanics from the journal of Measurement Science and Technology. Several more papers have been recognized in journal highlights and covers.

=== Discovery ===
Vlachos's scholarly contributions are primarily in fluid mechanics, specializing in experimental mechanics and non-invasive flow diagnostics using non-intrusive imaging methods, measurement and data science, biomechanics, image and signal processing, and uncertainty qualification. Currently, his research activities include heart failure and congenital heart disease, cerebral aneurysms, arterial flows, ultrasound and MRI medical imaging, bio-transport, drug delivery, and tumor micro-environments. He leads ongoing research aimed at the intersection of uncertainty quantification and data science with medical/clinical and engineering systems to tackle broader socio-technical challenges. At Virginia Tech, he co-founded an interdisciplinary graduate education program (NSF-IGERT and VT-IGEP) on MultiScale Transport in Environmental and Physiological Systems (MultiSTEPS), and co-founded and co-directed the Multifunctional Bio-Engineered Devices and Systems (MBEDS) center.

== Awards/Honors ==
- 2005 - MIT 2005 11th Annual T.F. Ogilvie Award, Young Investigator Lectureship in Ocean Engineering and Fluid Mechanics
- 2006 - NSF CAREER 06 Arterial Flow Dynamics: Effects of Pulsatility Compliance and Curvature
- 2006 - Frontiers of Engineering Symposium, National Academy of Engineering
- 2007, 2011 - Moody Award, ASME Division of Fluids Engineering
- 2007 - Faculty Fellow Award, College of Engineering
- 2008 - W. M Reed Lecture, University of Kentucky
- 2010 - John R. Jones Faculty Fellow, Mechanical Engineering Department, College of Engineering, Virginia Tech
- 2012 - Robert E. Hord Professor of Mechanical Engineering Department, College of Engineering, Virginia Tech
- 2014 - Cover, Journal of Experimental Biology; "Aerodynamics of the flying snake Chrysopelea paradisi: how a bluff body cross-sectional shape contributes to gliding performance", 217(3): 382-94.
- 2015 - Cover, Proceedings of the National Academy of Sciences; "Dogs lap using acceleration-driven open pumping", Dec 14; 201514842-5.
- 2020 - Fellow of the American Society of Mechanical Engineers
- 2021 - St. Vincent Health Professor of Healthcare Engineering
- 2022 - Fellow, American Institute for Medical and Biological Engineering

== Bibliography ==
- Eckstein, A., & Vlachos, P. P. (2009). Digital particle image velocimetry (DPIV) robust phase correlation. Measurement Science and Technology, 20(5), 055401.
- Timmins, B. H., Wilson, B. W., Smith, B. L., & Vlachos, P. P. (2012). A method for automatic estimation of instantaneous local uncertainty in particle image velocimetry measurements. Experiments in fluids, 53(4), 1133-1147.
- Charonko, J. J., & Vlachos, P. P. (2013). Estimation of uncertainty bounds for individual particle image velocimetry measurements from cross-correlation peak ratio. Measurement Science and Technology, 24(6), 065301.
- Antoine, E. E., Vlachos, P. P., & Rylander, M. N. (2014). Review of collagen I hydrogels for bioengineered tissue microenvironments: characterization of mechanics, structure, and transport. Tissue Engineering Part B: Reviews, 20(6), 683-696.
- Sciacchitano, A., Neal, D. R., Smith, B. L., Warner, S. O., Vlachos, P. P., Wieneke, B., & Scarano, F. (2015). Collaborative framework for PIV uncertainty quantification: comparative assessment of methods. Measurement Science and Technology, 26(7), 074004.
