= Lakiesha Williams =

American biomedical engineer

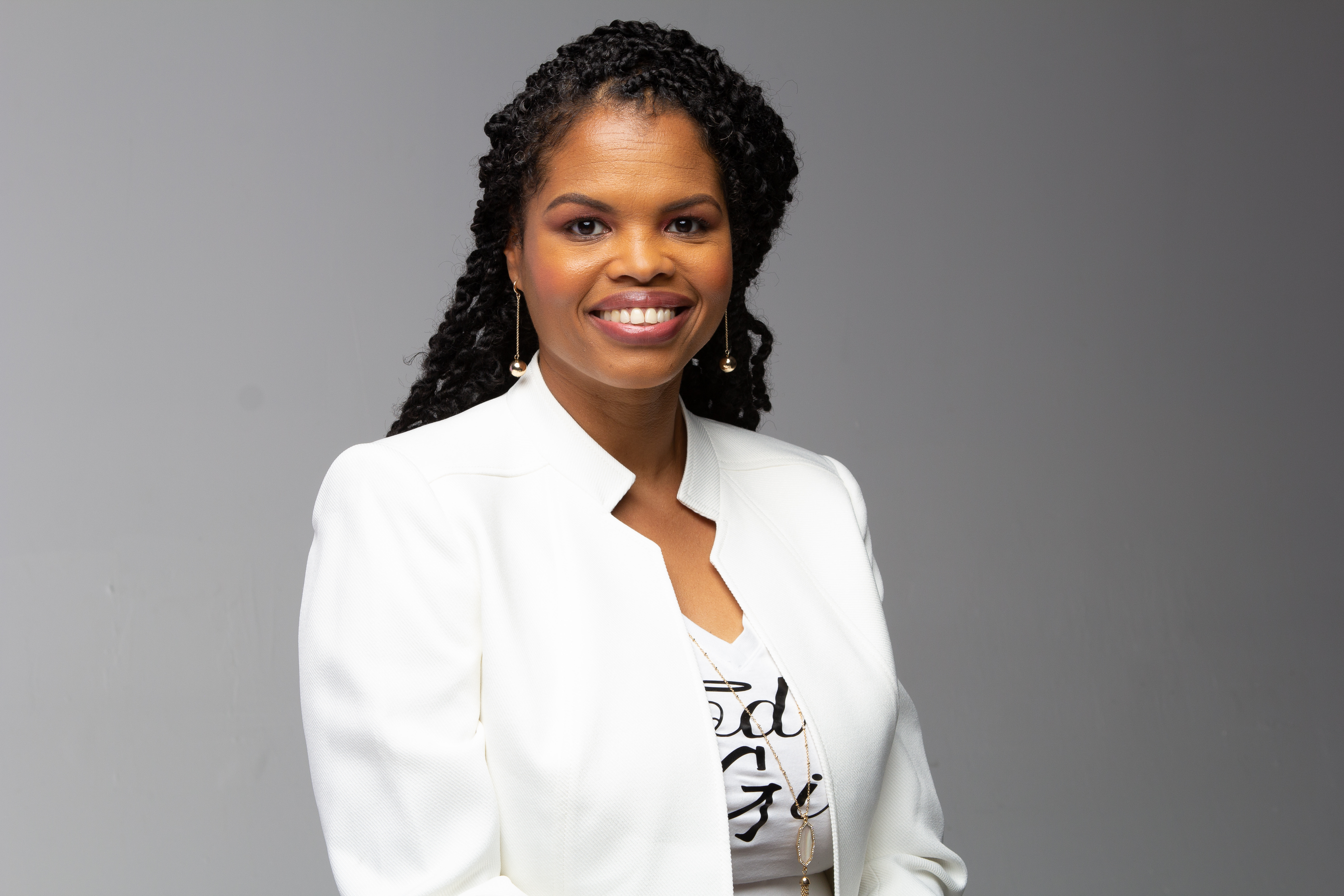
- Education: Louisiana State University; Mississippi State University
- Occupation: Biomedical engineer

Lakiesha Williams is a biomedical engineer and an associate professor at the University of Florida. Williams specializes in traumatic brain injury and biomechanics. Specifically, her work involves the modelling and mechanics of soft tissue, and how outside influences affect their structure. Much of her work on repetitive brain trauma involves utilizing preclinical models to study the long term neurodegenerative effects of damages.

== Biography ==
Williams grew up in New Orleans, with her dad working as a carpenter. Williams went on to become a first generation college student, college graduate, and Associate Professor.

=== Education ===
Williams received a Bachelor of Science and Master of Science degrees in Biological engineering from Louisiana State University in 2001 and 2003 respectively.

She earned her Doctor of Philosophy degree in Biomedical engineering at Mississippi State University in 2006.

=== Distinctions ===
- Sigma Xi - distinguished member
- National Society of Black Engineers - member
- American Society of Mechanical Engineers - member
- MSU President's Commission on the Status of Minorities - Committee Chair, 2017

=== Awards and honors ===
- American Institute for Medical and Biological Engineering - Fellow 2020: for “outstanding contributions in traumatic brain injury research and for tireless advocacy of biomedical engineering to communities underrepresented in STEM.“
- 100 Most Inspiring Black Scientists- 2020: On June 19, 2020, Dr. Williams was recognized amongst colleagues as one of the most inspiring black scientists
- Minority Access Incorporated - National Role Model Faculty Researcher Award (Mississippi State University), 2017
- Mississippi Business Journal Top in Technology, 2017
- Mississippi's Top 21 Most Wanted in Technology, 2014
- Bagley College of Engineering, Mississippi State University: Hearin Faculty Excellence Award, 2010
- Women of Color Magazine - Rising Star Award, 2008

== Selected publications ==
Williams has over 60 publications. Her most-cited work has been cited more than 90 times.

- Myocardial scaffold-based cardiac tissue engineering: application of coordinated mechanical and electrical stimulations. B Wang, G Wang, F To, JR Butler, A Claude, RM McLaughlin, LN Williams. . .(2013)
- Structural and biomechanical characterizations of porcine myocardial extracellular matrix. B Wang, ME Tedder, CE Perez, G Wang, AL de Jongh Curry, F To, ... (2012)
- The effects of water and microstructure on the mechanical properties of bighorn sheep (Ovis canadensis) horn keratin. MW Trim, MF Horstemeyer, H Rhee, H El Kadiri, LN Williams, J Liao, ... (2011)
- Hyperbolic method for prediction of prefabricated vertical drains performance. SG Chung, NK Lee, SR Kim (2009)
- Hierarchical multiscale structure–property relationships of the red-bellied woodpecker (Melanerpes carolinus) beak. N Lee, MF Horstemeyer, H Rhee, B Nabors, J Liao, LN Williams (2014)

== See also ==
- Biomechanics
- Traumatic brain injury
- Biomedical engineering
- American Institute for Medical and Biological Engineering
