= Biosensors and Bioelectronics =

- Discipline: Biosensors
- Language: English
- Edited by: Anthony P.F. Turner

Publication details
- Former name: Biosensors
- History: 1985-present
- Publisher: Elsevier
- Frequency: 8/year
- Impact factor: 10.7 (2023)

Standard abbreviations
- ISO 4: Biosens. Bioelectron.

Indexing
- CODEN: BBIOE4
- ISSN: 0956-5663
- LCCN: 97641485
- OCLC no.: 20767981

Links
- Journal homepage; Online access; Online archive

Biosensors and Bioelectronics is a peer-reviewed scientific journal published by Elsevier. It covers research on biosensors and bioelectronics. The journal was established in 1985 as Biosensors and obtained its current name in 1991. The journal was established by I. John Higgins (Cranfield University), W. Geoff Potter (Science and Engineering Research Council) and Anthony P.F. Turner (Cranfield University, later Linköping University), who became editor-in-chief, until his retirement in 2019. The current Editors in Chief are Chenzhong Li (Tulane University), Arben Merkoçi (Catalan Institute of Nanoscience and Nanotechnology), and Man Bock Gu (Korea University).

In 1990, the journal was complemented with an associated conference, Biosensors 90. The World Congress on Biosensors continues today.

According to the Journal Citation Reports, the journal has a 2023 impact factor of 10.7 5-Year Impact Factor: 9.323

Biosensors & Bioelectronics is the principal international journal devoted to research, design, development, and application of biosensors and bioelectronics. It is an interdisciplinary journal serving professionals with an interest in the exploitation of biological materials in novel diagnostic and electronic devices. Biosensors are defined as analytical devices incorporating a biological material (e.g. tissue, microorganisms, organelles, cell receptors, enzymes, antibodies, nucleic acids, etc.), a biologically derived material, or a biomimetic intimately associated with or integrated within a physicochemical transducer or transducing microsystem, which may be optical, electrochemical, thermometric, piezoelectric or magnetic. Biosensors usually yield a digital electronic signal which is proportional to the concentration of a specific analyte or group of analytes. While the signal may in principle be continuous, devices can be configured to yield single measurements to meet specific market requirements. Biosensors have been applied to a wide variety of analytical problems including in medicine, the environment, food, process industries, security, and defense. The emerging field of Bioelectronics seeks to exploit biology in conjunction with electronics in a wider context encompassing, for example, biomaterials for information processing, information storage, and actuators. A key aspect is an interface between biological materials and electronics. While endeavoring to maintain coherence in the scope of the journal, the editors will accept reviews and papers of obvious relevance to the community, which describe important new concepts, underpin an understanding of the field or provide important insights into the practical application of biosensors and bioelectronics.

== Abstracting and indexing ==
The journal is abstracted and indexed in:

- PubMed
- Current Contents
- BIOSIS Previews
- AGRICOLA
- Cambridge Scientific Abstracts
- Embase
- Chemical Abstracts Service
- Science Citation Index
- INSPEC
- Scopus
