= Journal of Tissue Engineering =

- Discipline: Tissue engineering
- Language: English
- Edited by: Hae-Won Kim, Jonathan Knowles

Publication details
- History: 2010-present
- Publisher: SAGE Publications
- Frequency: Upon acceptation
- Open access: Yes
- License: Creative Commons Attribution License

Standard abbreviations
- ISO 4: J. Tissue Eng.

Indexing
- ISSN: 2041-7314
- OCLC no.: 706499177

Links
- Journal homepage; Online access; Online archive

The Journal of Tissue Engineering is a peer-reviewed open-access medical journal that covers research on tissue engineering. Its editors-in-chief are Hae-Won Kim (Dankook University) and Jonathan Knowles (UCL Eastman Dental Institute). It was established in 2010 and is published by SAGE Publications.

== Abstracting and indexing ==
The Journal of Tissue Engineering is abstracted and indexed in:

- Academic Complete
- Biological Abstracts
- CSA Illumina
- EBSCO Discovery Service
- PubMed Central
