= Giorgio Carta (engineer) =

Italian chemical engineer

- Born: Italy
- Education: University of Cagliari; University of Delaware

Giorgio Carta is an Italian chemical engineer.

== Biography ==
Carta completed a bachelor's of science degree in chemical engineering at the University of Cagliari in 1980, then pursued doctoral study in the subject at the University of Delaware. Upon obtaining his PhD in 1984, Carta joined the University of Virginia faculty, where he was later named Lawrence R. Quarles Professor of Chemical Engineering. He became a member of the organizing committee for the PREP International Symposium, Exhibition and Workshops on Preparative and Process Chromatography, Ion Exchange, Adsorption Processes and Related Separation Techniques in 1997, and has chaired or co-chaired the body since 2009. Carta was elected to fellowship of the American Institute for Medical and Biological Engineering in 2002, and was similarly honored by the American Institute of Chemical Engineers in 2007.
