= David Nelson Ku =

American bioengineer and physician

- Education: Harvard University (BA); Georgia Institute of Technology (MS, PhD); Emory University (MD)
- Scientific career
- Fields: Bioengineering, hemodynamics, thrombosis, biomedical devices
- Workplaces: Georgia Institute of Technology; Emory University

David Nelson Ku is an American bioengineer and physician who is a Regents' Professor of Mechanical Engineering and the Lawrence P. Huang Chair in Engineering Entrepreneurship at the Georgia Institute of Technology. His research has included cardiovascular hemodynamics, thrombosis, biomaterials, and biomedical devices.

== Education and training ==
Ku received a B.A., magna cum laude, in Engineering and Applied Sciences from Harvard University in 1978. He received an M.S. in Aerospace Engineering from the Georgia Institute of Technology in 1982, a Ph.D. in biofluid dynamics from Georgia Tech in 1983, and an M.D. from Emory University in 1984.

== Academic career ==
Ku joined the Georgia Tech faculty in 1986 and was appointed Regents' Professor in 1998. He holds the Lawrence P. Huang Chair in Engineering Entrepreneurship at Georgia Tech. He has also held a professorial appointment in surgery at Emory University.

== Research ==
=== Hemodynamics and atherosclerosis ===
Ku's early research focused on the relationship between blood flow and atherosclerosis. In 1985, Ku, Don P. Giddens, Christopher K. Zarins, and Seymour Glagov reported an association between intimal thickening in the human carotid bifurcation and regions of low and oscillatory wall shear stress. The study introduced the oscillatory shear index (OSI), a measure of changes in wall shear direction.

The study has subsequently been discussed in reviews of arterial hemodynamics and atherosclerosis. A 2013 systematic review in Cardiovascular Research discussed Ku and colleagues' work in connection with the introduction of OSI and the subsequent development of the oscillatory-shear hypothesis of atherosclerosis. A 2022 review by Peter D. Weinberg described the 1985 study as showing that intimal thickening was greatest in regions with low time-averaged wall shear stress and high OSI.

Ku published a review of arterial blood flow in the Annual Review of Fluid Mechanics in 1997.

=== Arterial thrombosis ===
Ku's later research has examined arterial thrombosis under high-shear conditions, including experimental models of arterial stenosis and shear-dependent platelet aggregation.

=== Biomedical devices and biomaterials ===
Ku has also worked on biomedical devices and biomaterials, including poly(vinyl alcohol) hydrogels investigated for biomedical applications.

== Honors and awards ==
- 1987 – NSF Presidential Young Investigator Award
- 1989 – American Heart Association Young Investigator Award
- 1989 – Y. C. Fung Young Investigator Award, ASME Bioengineering Division
- 1996 – Gustus L. Larson Memorial Award, American Society of Mechanical Engineers
- 1998 – Fellow of the American Institute for Medical and Biological Engineering (AIMBE)

== Selected publications ==
- Ku DN, Giddens DP, Zarins CK, Glagov S. "Pulsatile flow and atherosclerosis in the human carotid bifurcation. Positive correlation between plaque location and low oscillating shear stress." Arteriosclerosis. 1985;5(3):293–302.
- Ku DN. "Blood flow in arteries." Annual Review of Fluid Mechanics. 1997;29:399–434.
- Kim DJ, Ku DN. "Occlusive thrombosis in arteries." APL Bioengineering. 2019;3(4):041502.
