= Dorin Comaniciu =

Romanian-American computer scientist

- Born: 1964 (age 61–62); Făgăraș, Romania
- Awards: Longuet-Higgins Prize (2010), IEEE Fellow (2012), ACM Fellow (2017), Elected to National Academy of Medicine (2019), Honorary Member Romanian Academy (2023), Elected to National Academy of Engineering (2025)
- Scientific career
- Fields: Machine Intelligence, Diagnostic Imaging, Image-Guided Therapy, Computer Vision
- Workplaces: Siemens, Siemens Healthineers
- Website: comaniciu.net

Dorin Comaniciu (born 1964) is a Romanian-American computer scientist. He is Senior Vice President of Artificial Intelligence and Digital Innovation at Siemens Healthineers.

== Research ==
Comaniciu is known for his work in computer vision, medical imaging and machine learning. His academic publications have 69,000 citations with an H-index of 112. As of 2026, he holds 359 US patents and 600 international patent applications. He joined Siemens in 1999 as a senior research scientist with a focus on computer vision applications for automotive systems. Since 2004, he has served in various research and leadership positions, directing technology development in diagnostic imaging and image-guided therapy

Most recently, his team's research has focused on artificial intelligence, hyper-realistic visualization, and precision medicine.

Together with his team and clinical collaborators, he has helped pioneer numerous clinical products, including efficient bone reading, vascular analysis, cardiac function assessment, trans-esophageal 3D heart valve assessment, guidance for aortic valve implantation, enhanced stent visualization, compressed sensing for Magnetic Resonance, and automatic patient positioning for Computed Tomography.

== Awards and honors ==
- Institute of Electrical and Electronics Engineers (IEEE) Conference on Computer Vision and Pattern Recognition (CVPR) Best Paper Award 2000 (together with Visvanathan Ramesh and Peter Meer)
- IEEE Longuet-Higgins Prize 2010, for 'Fundamental contributions in Computer Vision'
- IEEE Fellow 2012, for contributions to medical image analysis and computer vision
- American Institute for Medical and Biological Engineering (AIMBE) Fellow 2013, for technical contributions to medical imaging using machine learning, and for leadership in imaging technology
- Medical Image Computing and Computer-Assisted Interventions (MICCAI) Society Fellow 2015, for contributions to the theory and practice of medical imaging and image-guided interventions
- Association for Computing Machinery (ACM) Fellow 2017, for contributions to machine intelligence, diagnostic imaging, image-guided interventions, and computer vision
- Member of the National Academy of Medicine 2019
- Honorary Doctorate, University of Erlangen-Nuremberg, Germany 2022
- Honorary Member, Romanian Academy, Bucharest, Romania 2023
- Member of the National Academy of Engineering 2025
