= List of fellows of IEEE Engineering in Medicine and Biology Society =

The Fellow grade of membership is the highest level of membership, and cannot be applied for directly by the member – instead the candidate must be nominated by others. This grade of membership is conferred by the IEEE Board of Directors in recognition of a high level of demonstrated extraordinary accomplishment.

Year	Fellow	Citation
1974	White, Marvin	For contributions to the theory and development of solid-state electronic devices, especially memory transistors and charge-coupled imaging arrays.
1976	Lewis, E	For contributions to the modeling of neurological processes and the understanding of neurological transducers.
1978	Li, Ching C	For contributions to biocybernetics.
1978	Moschytz, George	For contributions to the theory and the development of hybrid-integrated linear communication networks.
1978	Osepchuk, John	For contributions to microwave technology and to microwave safety.
1981	Scifres, Donald	For contributions to the science and technology of diode lasers.
1982	Thiele, G	For contributions to computational methods in electromagnetic theory.
1983	Nagle, H Troy	For contributions to industrial electronics, data acquisition, and control instrumentation.
1986	Webster, John	For contributions to biomedical engineering education and research, and development of textbooks in medical instrumentation and clinical engineering.
1989	Teich, Malvin	For contributions to infrared heterodyne detection, to the generation of nonclassical light and for investigations of the statistical properties of light.
1993	Shung, K Kirk	For contributions to research in ultrasonic imaging and tissue characterization and to biomedical engineering education.
1984	Baras, John S	For contributions to distributed parameter systems theory, quantum and nonlinear estimation, and control of queuing systems.
1985	Fromm, Eli	For contributions in biotelemetry, transducers, and bioengineering research.
1985	Griffiths, Lloyd	For contributions to the theory of adaptive signal processing and adaptive antenna arrays.
1985	Khosla, Rajinder	For contributions to solid-state imaging, and for leadership in microelectronics.
1985	Matsumoto, Takashi	For pioneering contributions to nonlinear circuit theory.
1986	Wise, Kensall	For leadership in the field of integrated solid-state sensors and engineering education.
1986	Potvin, Alfred	For contributions to biomedical instrumentation design, neurology, rehabilitation, manned space flight, and biomedical engineering.
1986	Carr, Kenneth L	For contributions to the application of microwave technology in medicine.
1986	Lin, James	For contributions to understanding the biological effects of pulsed microwave in the inner ear of human.
1987	Jaron, Dov	For scientific and engineering contributions to the field of cardiac assist devices.
1988	Foster, Kenneth	For contributions to determining the mechanisms of interactions between electromagnetic fields and biological systems.
1988	Greenleaf, James	For contributions to the development of advanced medical imaging.
1989	O'Brien, William	For technical and administrative contributions to ultrasonic bio-engineering.
1989	Thong, Tran	For contributions to and applications of digital signal processing in instrumentation.
1989	Nevin, Robert	For technical leadership in the development of lightweight airborne multimode pulse-Doppler radar.
1990	Fetterman, Harold	For contributions in extending optical technologies into submillimeter and millimeter wave regions.
1990	Geiger, Randy	For contributions to discrete and integrated analog circuit design.
1990	Gopinath, A	For contributions to the analysis of microstrip discontinuities and to the development of microwave integrated circuits.
1990	Gupta, Madan	For contributions to the theory of fuzzy sets and adaptive control systems and to the advancement of the diagnosis of cardiovascular disease.
1990	Morgera, Salvatore	For contributions to finite-dimensional signal processing methods.
1991	Parker, Alice	For contributions to design automation in the areas of high-level synthesis, hardware descriptive languages, and design representation.
1991	Feinberg, Barry	For contributions to the practice of electrical engineering in medicine.
1991	Herman, Gabor	For contributions to medical imagine, particularly in the theory and development of techniques for the reconstruction and display of computed tomographic images.
1991	Robinson, Charles	For leadership in the field of rehabilitation engineering research and development.
1991	Burckhardt	For contributions to diagnostic ultrasound imaging.
1992	Tompkins, Willis	For contributions to biomedical engineering education.
1992	Stroscio, Michael	For contributions to the understanding of quantum and relativistic phenomena in solid-state and laser-produced plasma.
1993	Berbari, Edward	For developments in high-resolution electrocardiography.
1993	Gerhard, Reimund	For contributions to the study of dielectric materials and their application in communications devices.
1993	Shung, K Kirk	For contributions to research in ultrasonic imaging and tissue characterization and to biomedical engineering education.
1994	Jiles, David	For contributions to the understanding and application of hysteresis effects in magnetic materials.
1994	Moura, Jose	For contributions to nonlinear filtering and model-based signal processing.
1994	Taylor, Russell	For contributions and leadership in the theory and implementation of programmable sensor-based robot systems and in their application to surgery and manufacturing
1994	Usui, Shiro	For contributions to applications of neural networks to color vision discrimination.
1995	Cheung, Nim	For contributions to the understanding and development of high speed lightwave technology and to the architecture and application of gigabit networks.
1995	Harris, Gerald	For contributions to clinical research and education in human motion analysis and rehabilitation engineering.
1995	Coatrieux, Jean-Louis	For contributions in physiological signal processing and three-dimensional medical image analysis.
1995	Khuri-Yakub, B	For development of innovation nondestructive evaluation techniques, and for contributions to zinc oxide technology.
1995	Naidu, D. Subbaram	For contributions to the theory of singular perturbations in discrete-time control systems and for development of control strategies for aero-assisted orbital transfer.
1995	Ogura, Seiki	
1995	Sodini, Charles	For contributions to the development of oversampled A/D converters, DRAM devices and circuits, and integrated circuits process technology.
1996	Bourbakis, Nikolaos	For contributions to digital image scanning algorithms.
1996	Barr, Roger	For contributions to the theory of the electrocardiogram and its origin from currents and voltages within the heart.
1996	Charles, Harry	For leadership in electronics packaging technology for space, marine and biomedical electronic systems.
1996	Keutzer, Kurt	For contributions to logic synthesis and computer-aided design; specifically for the development of algorithms for the optimization of area, delay, testability, and power of digital circuits.
1996	Kim, Yongmin	For the development of new techniques in medical imaging, computer modeling of the human body, picture archiving and communication systems, and the transfer of novel technology to industry.
1996	Parhi, Keshab	For contributions to the fields of VLSI digital signal processing architectures, design methodologies and tools.
1996	Magin, Richard	For developments in target drug delivery systems for the diagnosis an treatment of cancer and for contributions to the understanding of the biological effects and safety aspects of electromagnetic radiation.
1996	Singh, V R	For contributions to the research and development in transducers and instrumentation systems for scientific and biomedical applications.
1996	Stokely, Ernest	For contributions to medical imaging, especially in the design of systems and software for measuring human brain blood perfusion in cross-section
1996	Tewfik, Ahmed	For contributions wavelet theory and fractal signal processing and their applications.
1996	Walker, Cedric	For leadership in computerized instruction in biomedical engineering.
1997	Marmarelis, Vasilis	For contributions to nonlinear physiological system modeling and leadership in biomedical engineering education.
1997	Delp, Edward	For contributions to image compression and processing.
1998	Kishk, Ahmeda	For contributions to the modeling of symmetrical antennas and scatters.
1998	Pallas-areny, Ramon	For contributions to medical and electronic instrumentation and biomedical sensors.
1998	Lightner, Michael	For contributions to the Computer-Aided Design of Integrated Circuits
1998	Verghese, George	For contributions to frequency-selective dynamic modeling, stability analysis and control in power electronics and power systems.
1998	Miller, J	For contributions to the understanding of properties of normal and diseased hearts using ultrasonics, echocardiography and myocardial tissue characterization.
1999	Dumont, Guy A.	For contributions to the theory and practice of adaptive control and its applications to the process industries.
1999	Valentinuzzi, M	For application of electromagnetics to biology and medicine.
1999	Loparo, Kenneth	For contributions to stochastic stability and control theory with applications to engineering systems.
1999	Chizeck, Howard	For contributions to the use of control system theory in biomedical engineering.
1999	Reilly, J-patrick	For contributions to the understanding of biological response to electric current and electromagnetic fields with application to medical devices and safety standards.
1999	Steckl, Andrew	For contributions to focused ion beam implantation and semiconductor device fabrication.
2000	Ermert, Helmut	For contributions to coherent wave imaging and its application to medical diagnostics and nondestructive testing, and to engineering education.
2000	Plamondon, Rejean	For contributions to signature verification, handwriting recognition, assisted learning and biosignal analysis.
2000	Keller, James	For contributions to the integration of fuzzy set theoretic technologies into computer vision and pattern recognition.
2000	Pei, Soo-chang	For contributions to the development of digital eigenfilter design, color image coding and signal compression, and to electrical engineering education in Taiwan.
2000	Principe, Jose	For development of the gamma neural model and for its applications in signal processing.
2001	Duncan, James	For contributions to medical image analysis and computer vision.
2001	Shi, Bertram	For contributions to the analysis, implementation and application of cellular neural networks
2001	Pasik-Duncan, Bozenna	For contributions to identification and stochastic adaptive control.
2001	Hudson, Donna	For contributions to the development of techniques for computer-assisted medical decision making.
2001	Lee, Insup	For contributions to the specification languages and verification tools for real-time systems.
2001	Kondraske, George	For contributions to the quantitative understanding of human performance through modeling and the development of instrumentation.
2001	Kearney, Robert	For contributions in understanding peripheral neuromuscular system dynamics and development of methods for the identification of biomedical systems.
2001	Piuri, Vincenzo	For contributions to neural network techniques and embedded digital architectures for industrial applications.
2002	De Rooij, Nico	For contributions to microelectrical/mechanical systems and technology transfer to the marketplace.
2002	Wodicka, George	For contributions to biomedical acoustic research and its application to clinical diagnosis and therapy.
2002	Mathews, V	For contributions to the theory and application of nonlinear and adaptive filtering.
2002	Loew, Murray	For contributions to medical image analysis, pattern recognition, and digital image processing.
2002	D'andrea, John	For contributions to human RF safe-exposure standards.
2002	Jagadish, Chennupati	For contributions to III-V compound semiconductor optoelectronic device integration.
2002	Sonka, Milan	For contributions to medical image analysis and computer vision.
2002	Szeto, Andrew	For contributions to rehabilitation engineering.
2003	Wang, Ge	For contributions to X-ray tomography.
2003	Cerutti, Sergio	For leadership in biomedical signal processing and modeling of cardiovascular and neural systems.
2003	Dario, Paolo	For contributions to the development of biomedical robotics.
2003	Fang, Wai-chi	For contributions to VLSI systems using neural-based methods.
2004	Higgins, William	For contributions to three-dimensional medical imaging and processing
2004	He, Bin	For contributions to the development of electrophysiological neuroimaging and electrocardiographic imaging.
2004	Prince, Jerry	For contributions to signal and image processing for medical imaging
2004	Leahy, Richard	For contributions to positron emission tomography, encephalography, and magnetic resonance imaging.
2004	Sawan, Mohamad	For contributions to implantable medical devices.
2004	Silevitch, Michael][	For leadership in advancing interdisciplinary subsurface sensing and imaging techniques
2004	Ziskin, Marvin	For contributions to medical applications of radiation.
2004	Gullberg, Grant	For contributions to medical imaging technologies.
2005	Ito, Koichi	For contributions to the development of antennas for mobile communications and medical applications.
2005	Wunsch, Donald	For contributions to hardware implementations of reinforcement and unsupervised learning.
2006	Tai, Yu-chong	For contributions to integrated nano/micro-electro-mechanical systems (MEMS) and nano/micro-fluidics for Lab-on-a-Chip applications.
2007	Sahakian, Alan	For contributions to electrophysiology of atrial cardiac arrhythmias
2005	Roux, Christian	For contribution to the theory of functional shapes and its applications in medical imaging
2005	Meldrum, Deirdre	For contributions to genome automation.
2005	Salcudean, Tim	For contributions to haptic interfaces, teleoperation systems and applications.
2006	Andreou, Andreas	For contributions to energy efficient sensory microsystem
2006	Liang, Zhi-pei	For contributions to biomedical applications of magnetic resonance imaging.
2006	Kun, Luis	For contributions to health care information infrastructure.
2008	Yoo, Hoi-jun	For contributions to low-power and high-speed VLSI design
2006	Fessler, Jeffrey	For contributions to theory and practice of image reconstruction.
2006	Kosuge, Kazuhiro	For contributions to multiple robots coordination and human-robot interface.
2006	Lee, Raphael	For contributions to biophysics of cellular and tissue injury by electric currents and development of polymers for repair of cellular damage.
2007	Liang, Jerome	For contributions to medical image reconstruction and virtual colonoscopy
2007	Viergever, Max	For leadership and contributions to medical imaging.
2007	Malmivuo, Jaakko	For contributions to theoretical and experimental aspects of bioelectromagnetic phenomena
2007	Pan, Xiaochuan	For contributions to nuclear and non-invasive imaging
2007	Aarts, Ronald	For research and application in signal processing for acoustics and sound reproduction
2007	Amini, Amir	For contributions to cardiovascular imaging and medical image analysis
2007	Skellern, David	For contributions to high speed devices and systems for wireless and wireline communications networks
2007	Goldgof, Dmitry	For contributions to computer vision and biomedical applications
2007	Zhang, Yuanting	For contributions to the field of wearable devices and signal processing algorithms for mobile healthcare
2008	Ganz, Aura	For contributions to architectures, algorithms, and protocols for high speed communications networks
2008	Joines, W	For contributions to frequency-selective structures in microwave circuits, biology, and medicine
2008	Wikswo, John	For contributions to understanding electromagnetic effects on materials and biological tissues
2008	Tarjan, Peter	For leadership in the development of cardiovascular devices
2008	Wheeler, Bruce	For contributions to the neuroengineering of invitro experimental systems
2008	Mark, Roger	For development of physiologic signal databases and automated arrhythmia analysis
2008	Lazzi, Gianluca	For contributions to bioelectromagnetics and implantable devices
2008	Li, Pai-chi	For contributions to ultrasonic imaging technologies
2009	Akay, Metin	For contributions to biomedical signal modeling and processing
2009	Udupa, Jayaram	For contributions to medical image processing
2009	Van Huffel, Sabine	For contributions to total least squares fitting and computational biosignal processing
2009	Eriksson, Lars A	For development of instrumentation and methodologies for molecular imaging
2009	Fiorini, Paolo	For contributions to mobile robot navigation in dynamic environments
2009	Kovacs, Gregory	For contributions to fabrication and use of biosensors for medical, environmental and space applications
2009	Lowery, Arthur	For leadership in computer modeling of optical communication systems
2009	Peters, Terence	For contributions to medical imaging and image-guided surgery.
2010	Acharya, Raj	For contributions to biomedical imaging and bioinformatics.
2010	Hagness, Susan	For contributions to time-domain computational electromagnetics and microwave medical imaging.
2010	Wright, Steven	For contributions to parallel magnetic resonance imaging methods and systems.
2010	Berger, Theodore	For contributions to nonlinear systems modeling of neural tissue and development of neural prostheses.
2010	Cohen, Laurent	For contributions to computer vision technology for medical imaging.
2010	Dawant, Benoit	For contributions to biomedical image analysis and image guided medical interventions
2010	Durand, Dominique	For contributions to the understanding of electromagnetic fields of human neurology
2010	Fan, Long-sheng	For contributions to Micro Electro-Mechanical Systems
2010	Johnson, Arthur	For leadership in bioengineering education
2010	Kikkawa, Takamaro	For contributions to interconnect technologies for integrated circuits
2010	Laine, Andrew	For contributions to wavelet applications in digital mammography, and ultrasound image analysis.
2010	Tian, Jie	For contributions to medical image processing, pattern recognition, and molecular imaging
2011	Ebbini, Emad	For contributions to ultrasound temperature imaging and dual-mode ultrasound
2011	Okamura, Allison	For contributions to the design and control of haptic systems and medical robotics
2011	Boppart, Stephen	For contributions to optical biomedical imaging
2011	Cauwenberghs, Gert	For contributions to integrated biomedical instrumentation
2011	Groza, Voicu	For contributions to floating-point analog-to-digital conversion
2011	Hartley, Craig	For contributions to high frequency ultrasonic medical instrumentation
2011	Loughlin, Patrick	For contributions to time-frequency analysis and nonstationary signal processing.
2011	Lovell, Nigel	For contributions to medical device technologies including telehealth systems and visual prostheses.
2011	Mestha, Lalit	For contributions to digital printing systems control.
2011	Nagahara, Larry	For leadership in nanotechnology devices and measurement applications.
2011	Serdijn, Wouter	For contributions to integrated circuits for medical devices and wireless communications
2011	Ryan, Thomas	For contributions to channel coding for reliable data transmission and storage.
2011	Yang, Guang-zhong	For contributions to medical imaging and robotic surgery
2012	Bahai, Ahmad	For contributions to multi-carrier wireless and wire-line communication systems
2012	Cote, Gerard	For development of innovative optical sensors for in vitro and in vivo medical diagnosis and monitoring.
2012	Dillmann, Ruediger	For contributions to robot programming and human-centered technologies
2012	Tell, Richard	For contributions to assessment and safety standards for human exposure to radio frequency energy.
2012	Olivo-Marin, Jean-Christophe	For contributions to image analysis and its applications in biological imaging.
2012	Fatemi, Mostafa	For contribution to ultrasound radiation force imaging and tissue characterization.
2012	Fogel, Gary	For contributions to computational intelligence and its application to biology, chemistry, and medicine
2012	Fujie, Masakatsu	For contributions to medical robotics.
2012	Goubran, Rafik	For contributions to voice quality measurement and its applications to audio improvement.
2012	Howe, Robert	For contributions to haptic interfaces and robotic manipulation
2012	Humayun, Mark	For contributions to development of an artificial retina.
2012	Insana, Michael	For contributions to ultrasound imaging methods, particularly elastography.
2012	Kehtarnavaz, Nasser	For contributions to real-time and biomedical image processing.
2012	Khoo, Michael C	For contributions to cardiorespiratory control in sleep disorders.
2012	Kroll, Mark	For contributions to implantable and external defibrillator technology
2012	Plataniotis, Konstantin	For contributions to the theory and application of statistical adaptive learning
2012	Rajapakse, Jagath	For contributions to computational techniques for magnetic resonance imaging.
2013	Fenster, A	For contributions to medical Imaging and ultrasound-guided intervention
2013	Acton, Scott	For contributions to biomedical image analysis.
2013	Hao, Yang	For contributions to antennas and propagation for body-centric wireless communications.
2013	Behbehani, Khosrow	For contributions to development of respiratory therapy devices in chronic pulmonary diseases chronic pulmonary diseases.
2013	Calhoun, Vincent	For contributions to data-driven processing of multimodal brain imaging and genetic data.
2013	Mandic, Danilo	For contributions to multivariate and nonlinear learning systems.
2013	Pichot, Christian	For contributions to microwave tomography and antenna designs.
2013	Kreutz-Delgado, K	For contributions to sparse signal recovery algorithms and dictionary learning
2014	Frangi, Alejandro Federico	For contributions to medical image analysis and image-based computational physiology.
2014	Acharya, Raj	For contributions to biomedical imaging and bioinformatics.
2014	Johnson, Christopher	For leadership in scientific computing and scientific visualization.
2014	Karl, W Clem	For contributions to statistical signal processing and image reconstruction.
2014	Krebs, Hermano	For contributions to rehabilitation robotics and the understanding of neuro-rehabilitation
2014	Wang, Yi	For contributions to cardiovascular MRI development and quantitative susceptibility mapping.
2014	Xie, Ya-Hong	For contributions to strained-silicon materials and devices.
2015	Bilek, Marcela	For contributions to the science and application of plasma processes for materials modification and synthesis.
2015	Jones, Richard	For contributions to human performance engineering and neurorehabilitation.
2015	Boric-Lubecke, Olga	For contributions to biomedical microwave technology.
2015	Jung, Tzyy-ping	For contributions to blind source separation for biomedical applications.
2015	Sun, Yu	For contributions to automated manipulation of biological cells
2015	Yener, Bulent	For contributions to network design optimization and security.
2015	Mallik, Debendra	For contributions to microprocessor packaging.
2015	Wilson, Blake	For development of cochlear implants.
2016	Bequette, B Wayne	For contributions to design and control of chemical and biomedical systems.
2016	Gabor Fichtinger	For contributions to medical robotics and computer-assisted intervention.
2016	Giger, Maryellen	For contributions to computer-aided biomedical imaging and diagnosis.
2016	Daniel Rueckert	For contributions to biomedical image computing
2016	Guiseppi-elie, Anthony	For contributions to organic electronic materials in biotechnology and biomedicine.
2016	Huang, Tony Jun	For contributions to acousto-opto-fluidics, and nanoelectromechanical systems.
2016	Meng, Ellis	For contributions to biomedical microelectromechanical systems.
2016	Paulsen, Keith	For leadership in biomedical technologies in medical imaging for diagnosis and intervention.
2017	Halgamuge, Saman	For contributions to computational intelligence in bioinformatics and mechatronics.
2017	Ozcan, Aydogan	For contributions to biophotonics, computational imaging, and sensing for telemedicine and global health.
2017	Zhang, Xin	For contributions to microelectromechanical systems.
2017	Estevez, Pablo	For contributions to feature selection and visualization of large data sets.
2017	Hirata, Akimasa	For contributions to safety assessment and standardization of human exposure to electromagnetic fields.
2017	Sornmo, Leif	For contributions to biomedical signal processing in cardiac applications.
2017	Li, Jingshan	For contributions to manufacturing system automation. 226...135
2017	Li, Xin	For contributions to modeling, analysis, and optimization of variability of integrated circuits and systems.
2017	Weiland, James	For contributions to the design, development, and realization of retinal prostheses
2017	Lie, Donald	For contributions to high linearity and high efficiency silicon RF power amplifiers for broadband wireless applications.
2017	Millan, Jose Del R.	For contributions to brain-controlled robots.
2018	Wong, Stephen T	For leadership in drug discovery, systems biology, bioinformatics, and health analytics.
2018	Nikita, Konstantina	For contributions to bioelectromagnetics and implantable antennas for medical applications.
2018	Oakley, Barbara	For outreach through online engineering pedagogy.
2018	Pattichis, C	For contributions to medical diagnostic and mobile health systems.
2018	Pluim, Josien	For contributions to medical image analysis
2018	Roysam, Badrinath	For contributions to image processing algorithms for biological microscopy.
2018	Troccaz, Jocelyne	For contributions to robotics and imaging for medical applications.
2018	Farina, Dario	For contributions to neuromuscular electrophysiology and neurorehabilitation.
2018	Zaidi, Habib	For contributions to quantitative multimodality molecular imaging.
2018	Abshire, Pamela Ann	For contributions to CMOS biosensors.
2018	Friend, James	For contributions to acoustics, microfluidics and microactuation.
2018	Guan, Cuntai	For contributions to brain-computer interfaces and applications.
2018	Guo, Yongxin	For contributions to wideband printed antennas.
2018	Kim, Sung	For contributions to the design of microfabricated neural prosthetic devices.
2018	Laguna Lasosa, Pablo	For contributions to cardiac biomedical signal processing.
2018	Mascolo, Saverio	For contributions to modeling and control of congestion in packet networks.
2018	Ma, Zhenqiang	For contributions to flexible and biodegradable microwave electronics.
2019	Gerig, Guido	For contributions to medical image processing.
2019	Contreras, Jose Luis	For contributions to brain-machine interfaces and wearable exoskeletons.
2019	Fotiadis, Dimitrios	For contributions to modelling and machine learning in biomedical data processing.
2019	Hong, Keum-shik	For contributions to adaptive estimation and brain-computer interface techniques.
2019	Meijering, Erik	For contributions to computational methods for biological image analysis.
2019	Hou, Zeng-guang	For contributions to neural network optimization and control for rehabilitation.
2019	Rohling, Robert	For contributions to ultrasound for medical diagnosis and intervention.
2019	Aitchison, J Stewart	For contributions to nonlinear optical devices and point-of-care testing systems.
2019	Sunagawa, Kenji	For contributions to cardiovascular mechanics, baroreflex dynamics, and bionic cardiology applications.
2019	Madabhushi, Anant	For contributions in image analysis tools for diagnosis and prognosis of diseases.
2020	Chiao, Jung-chih	For contributions to wireless and battery-less medical implants.
2020	Nikzad, Shouleh	For contributions to ultraviolet detectors for space applications.
2020	Cios, Krzysztof	For contributions to data mining and machine learning
2020	Ye, Jong Chul	For contributions to signal processing and machine learning for bio-medical imaging.
2020	Hussain, Muhammad	For contributions to flexible and stretchable electronic circuits.
2020	Jovanov, Emil	For contributions to wearable health monitoring.
2020	Murphy, Robert	For contributions to machine learning algorithms for biological images.
2020	Reinhardt, Joseph	For contributions to medical image processing and analysis.
2020	Saha, Punam	For contributions to quantitative bone microstructural imaging and analysis.
2021	Avolio, Alberto	For contributions to knowledge and monitoring of arterial hemodynamics.
2021	Gee, James	For contributions to medical image processing and analysis.
2021	Ohta, Jun	For contributions to CMOS image sensors and devices for biomedical applications.
2021	Peng, Hanchuan	For contributions to visualization and quantitative analysis of large-scale biological data.
2021	Schnabel, Julia	For contributions to medical image computing.
2021	Voldman, Joel	For contributions to electronic microscale manipulation of cells.
2021	Wang, Jianqing	For contributions to electro-magnetic compatibility of biological and wearable/implant devices.
2021	Yang, Yongyi	For contributions to medical image recovery and analysis.
2021	Yang, Guang-Zhong	For contributions to medical imaging and robotic surgery.
2022	Zheng, Yefeng	For contributions to machine learning for medical imaging.
2022	Wang, Dongmei	For contributions to biomedical informatics and AI.
2022	Valdastri, Pietro	For contributions to medical capsule robots.
2022	Stieglitz, Thomas	For contributions to flexible micromachined neural interfaces and microimplants.
2022	Simske, Steven	For contributions to anti-counterfeiting and cyber-physical security.
2022	Solzbacher, Florian	For the development of tools enabling applied and translational neuroscience and neural engineering.
2022	Penzel, Thomas	For contributions to biosignal analysis for sleep medicine.
2022	Nayak, Krishna	For contributions to real-time magnetic resonance imaging of the human heart and vocal tract airway.
2022	Micera, Silvestro	For contributions to restoration of human sensorimotor functions using engineered neuroprostheses.
2022	Konofagou, Elisa	For contributions to ultrasound for cardiovascular and cancer diagnosis, neuromodulation and brain drug delivery.
2022	Kim, Jin-Woo	For contributions to nanoscale fabrication of bio/nano-hybrid materials.
2022	Isernia, Tommaso	For contributions on antennas synthesis and inverse scattering problems.
2022	Costanzo, Alessandra	For contributions to nonlinear electromagnetic co-design of RF and microwave circuits.
2022	Chon, Ki	For the development of novel algorithms to detect atrial fibrillation from smart wearable devices.
2022	Bandyopadhyay, Anirban	For leadership in silicon RF-SOI technologies.
2023	Andriulli, Francesco	For contributions to computational electromagnetics.
2023	Bhansali, Shekhar	For contributions to portable realtime sensing devices for continuous monitoring.
2023	Dollar, Aaron	For contributions to dexterous grasping and manipulation.
2023	El-Baz, Ayman	For contributions to artificial intelligence in medicine.
2023	Frisina, Robert	For distinguished contributions in neuroengineering and auditory sciences, especially age-related hearing loss causes and treatments.
2023	Heller, Richard	For contributions to medical engineering for therapeutic applications.
2023	Huang, He	For contributions in control development in rehabilitation robotics .
2023	Lanza, Richard	For developing novel imagers and radiation detectors applied to medicine and security problems.
2023	Laschi, Cecilia	For contributions to soft robotics.
2023	Molinas, Marta	For contributions to modeling and stability of power electronics.
2023	Noll, Douglas	For contributions to functional magnetic resonance imaging of the brain.
2023	Oralkan, Omer	For contributions to micromachined ultrasonic transducers and integrated microsystems development, for imaging, therapy, and sensing.
2023	Schuckers, Dr Stephanie	For contributions in biometric recognition systems.
2023	Wang, Hua	For contributions to high-efficiency microwave and millimeter-wave power amplifiers.
2023	Wear, Keith	For applying acoustic pressure measurements to improve the safety and effectiveness of medical ultrasound.
2023	Wu, Dongrui	For contributions to fuzzy logic and its applications to controls and decision-making.
2023	Zhang, Li	For contributions to micro-/nanorobot swarms and platforms for translational biomedicine.
2024	Yeow, John	For contributions to the understanding and applications of nanostructures and nanocomposites.
2024	Yu, Alfred	For contributions to ultrasound imaging technology and therapy.
2024	Yu, Hengyong	For contribution to tomographic image reconstruction.
2024	Tourassi, Georgia	For contributions to artificial intelligence and high performance computing in medicine.
2024	Subramaniam, Shankar	For contributions to biomedical science and engineering.
2024	STOYANOV, DANAIL	For contributions to intelligent computer-assisted surgical and diagnostical systems.
2024	Rodriguez-Villegas, Esther	For contributions to low power biomedical circuits and systems for wearable medical applications.
2024	Mueller, Klaus	For contributions to image reconstruction and visualization.
2024	Munoz-Barrutia, Arrate	For contributions to biomedical image processing.
2024	McShane, Michael	For contributions to biomaterials-based optical biosensors.
2024	Kim, Chulhong	For contribution to photoacoustic imaging and its clinical applications.
2024	Inan, Omer	For contributions to wearable systems for health sensing.
2024	Englehart, Kevin	For contributions to myoelectric signal processing in rehabilitation engineering.
2024	Cho, SeongHwan	For contributions to time-domain circuits and applications.
2024	Collins, Leslie	For contributions to signal processing algorithms for auditory applications and to buried threat detection.
2024	Baumert, Mathias	For contributions to biomedical signal processing and clinical applications.
2024	Antani, Sameer	For contributions to medical imaging research in high-morbidity disease screening.
2025	Choi, Hongsoo	For contributions to the development and implementation of medical tethered and untethered microrobots.
2025	Falk, Tiago	For contributions to cognitive computing for adaptive, context-aware human-machine systems.
2025	Lee, Jae Sung	For contributions to positron emission tomography and hybrid imaging systems and technologies.
2025	Mercier, Patrick	For contributions to low-power and energy-efficient circuits and systems.
2025	Mukkamala, Ramakrishna	For contributions to advanced hemodynamic monitoring and cuffless blood pressure measurement.
2025	Pachori, Ram Bilas	For contributions to application of signal decomposition methods to biomedical engineering.
2025	Szabo, Thomas	For contributions to ultrasound education and establishing technical standards.
2025	Tang, Kea-Tiong	For contributions to smart miniature electronic nose circuits and systems.
2025	Wu, Fangxiang	For contributions to computational intelligence techniques for biomedical data analytics.
2025	Yao, Jianhua	For contributions to computer aided diagnosis, computational genomics and healthcare AI product development.
