= George R. Wodicka =

American biomedical engineer

George R. Wodicka is an American biomedical engineering educator, researcher, inventor, entrepreneur, and academic administrator. He is the Vincent P. Reilly Professor of Biomedical Engineering and was the Dane A. Miller Founding Head of the Weldon School of Biomedical Engineering at Purdue University. His research and entrepreneurship focuses on the application of acoustic technologies to improve child health.

== Early life and education ==
Wodicka was born and raised in Malverne, New York, and graduated from Malverne High School in 1978. He received the B.E.S. degree from The Johns Hopkins University in 1982 where he worked under the guidance of Moise Goldstein, Murray Sachs, and Eric Young. He then received the S.M. degree in electrical engineering and computer science in 1985 and the PhD degree in medical engineering in 1989 from the Massachusetts Institute of Technology under the guidance of Kenneth N. Stevens and Daniel C. Shannon within the Harvard–MIT Program in Health Sciences and Technology.

== Career ==
Wodicka joined the faculty of the School of Electrical and Computer Engineering at Purdue University in 1989. He received a Young Investigator Award from the National Science Foundation for research in bioacoustics. He was recognized as the top instructor in the Purdue College of Engineering via the A.A. Potter Award. Wodicka was then named a Guggenheim Fellow which allowed him to undertake early clinical studies of novel monitoring systems for neonates at the Massachusetts General Hospital. These studies ultimately led to his founding of SonarMed, Inc. with two of his doctoral students, Jeffrey Mansfield and Eduardo Juan, which developed and marketed the only FDA-approved system to monitor the position of breathing tubes in infants requiring assisted ventilation. SonarMed, Inc. was then acquired by Medtronic, Inc. which markets the system worldwide.

Wodicka was named the founding head of the new Department of Biomedical Engineering at Purdue University in 1998. He guided significant philanthropic gifts that were recognized by renaming the department the Weldon School of Biomedical Engineering, establishing the Dane A. Miller Headship, as well as creating both the Leslie A. Geddes and Marta E. Gross professorships and the Bottorff Fellows graduate program. He also led an initiative that resulted in support from the State of Indiana. For his efforts, Wodicka was recognized with the Purdue College of Engineering Leadership Award and the Purdue University Outstanding Commercialization Award.

Wodicka directs the inter-institutional partnership between the Purdue College of Engineering and its Weldon School of Biomedical Engineering and the Indiana University School of Medicine, the largest medical school in the United States. He constructed the biomedical engineering component of the National Institutes of Health (NIH)-supported Medical Scientist (MD/PhD) Training Program as led by D. Wade Clapp that trains physician-engineers. He co-leads with Sherry Harbin Purdue's college-wide Engineering-Medicine initiative. Wodicka also serves as the deputy director of the NIH-supported Indiana Clinical and Translational Sciences Institute (CTSI). He also serves on the Purdue Foundry Investment Fund board that oversees capital investment in life science companies based upon licensed Purdue technologies.

Wodicka is a Fellow of the American Institute for Medical and Biological Engineering (AIMBE) and the Institute of Electrical and Electronics Engineers (IEEE) where he has served on both the Administrative and Fellows Committees. He was a member of the Harvard-MIT Division of Health Sciences and Technology Visiting Committee and serves on the advisory board of the Department of Biomedical Engineering at the Johns Hopkins University. He is also a member of the editorial board of the Annual Review of Biomedical Engineering.

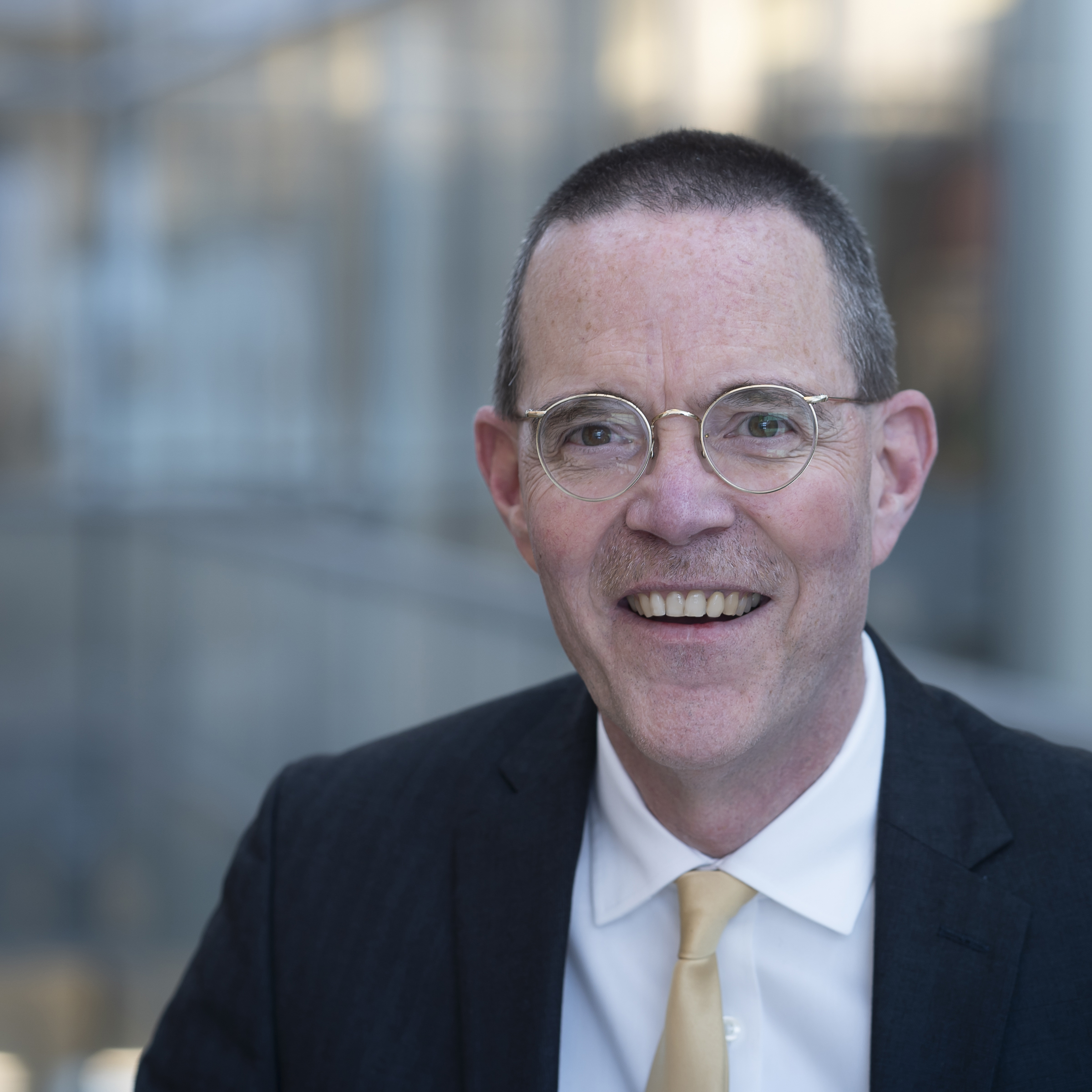
George R. Wodicka, Dane A. Miller Head and Professor, Weldon School of Biomedical Engineering, Purdue University

== Societies and awards ==
Wodicka is associated with the following societies and organizations:

- Young Investigator Award, National Science Foundation
- Fellow, John Simon Guggenheim Foundation
- Fellow, Institute of Electrical and Electronics Engineers
- Fellow, American Institute for Medical and Biological Engineering
- A.A. Potter Teaching Award, Purdue College of Engineering
- Leadership Award, Purdue College of Engineering
- Outstanding Commercialization Award, Purdue University
- Vincent P. Reilly Professorship, Purdue University

== Selected publications and patents ==
A complete list of Wodicka's publications and patents are available online. This is a listing of his most-cited works:

=== Publications ===
- Pasterkamp, H., Kraman, S.S. and Wodicka, G.R., “State of the art review: Lung Sounds: Advances beyond the stethoscope,” American Journal of Respiratory and Critical Care Medicine, 156: 974–987, 1997.
- Kompis, M., Pasterkamp, H., and Wodicka, G.R., “Acoustic imaging of the human lung,” Chest, 120: 1309–1321, 2001.
- Wodicka, G.R., Stevens, K.N., Golub, H.L., Cravalho, E.G., and Shannon, D.C., “A model of acoustic transmission in the respiratory system,” IEEE Transactions on Biomedical Engineering, 36(9): 925–934, 1989.
- Pasterkamp, H., Kraman, S.S., DeFrain, P.D., and Wodicka, G.R., “Measurement of respiratory acoustical signals: comparison of sensors,” Chest, 104: 1518–1525, 1993.
- Harper, P., Pasterkamp, H., Kraman, S.S. and Wodicka, G.R., “An acoustic model of the respiratory tract,” IEEE Transactions on Biomedical Engineering, 48(5): 543–550, 2001.
- Zañartu, M., Mongeau, L., and Wodicka, G.R., “Influence of acoustic loading on an effective single mass model of the vocal folds,” Journal of the Acoustical Society of America, 121(2): 1119–1129, 2007. DOI: 10.1121/1.2409491

=== Patents ===
- Wodicka, G.R., Mansfield, J.P., and Voorhees, W.D., “Apparatus and Method for Acoustically Guiding, Positioning and Monitoring a Tube Within a Body,” U.S. Patent Number 5,445,144, 1995
- Wodicka, G.R., Mansfield, J.P., and Juan, E.J., “Miniature Acoustical Guidance and Monitoring System for Tube or Catheter Placement,” U.S. Patent Number 6,705,319, March 16, 2004. Also issued as “Acoustical Guidance and Monitoring System for Endotrachea,” European Patent Number 1289594, February 25, 2009, and Canadian Patent Number 2,410,256, April 14, 2009.
