= Alyssa Panitch =

American biomedical engineer

- Occupations: Biomedical Engineering Professor and Department Chair at Georgia Tech and Emory University
- Awards: CTSC Pilot Translation and Clinical Studies Program's Highly Innovative Award, National Science Foundation Career Award, Purdue Faculty Scholar,

Academic background
- Education: BSc, Biochemistry, Smith College; BSc, Chemical Engineering, PhD, Polymer Science and Engineering, 1997, University of Massachusetts Amherst College of Engineering
- Thesis: Design, synthesis and characterization of artificial extracellular matrix proteins for tissue engineering (1997)

Alyssa Panitch is an American biomedical engineer. She is a Professor and department chair in the Wallace H. Coulter Department of Biomedical Engineering at Georgia Tech and Emory University. Panitch focuses on designing biopolymers that improve tissue healing and regeneration by researching intracellular and extracellular approaches to direct molecular and cellular processes. Her research is on the extracellular matrix and how matrix signals affect regeneration, including nerve regeneration, wound healing and angiogenesis, cartilage and vascular. Recently, Panitch is exploring the proteoglycan component of the ECM, which is a critical component of tissue function. The Panitch laboratory has proven that proteoglycan function can be repeated by conjugating short, bioactive peptide sequences to GAGs. These sequences direct the GAG to its target to ensure it is held in place. By mimicking the function of proteoglycan, Panitch's laboratory was able to develop therapeutics used to treat osteoarthritis, improve wound healing, and treat diseased blood vessels.

== Early life and education ==
Panitch completed her Bachelor of Arts in biochemistry from Smith College while simultaneously completing a second degree in chemical engineering followed by her PhD in polymer science and engineering at the University of Massachusetts Amherst College of Engineering . Her doctoral thesis was titled "Design, synthesis and characterization of artificial extracellular matrix proteins for tissue engineering." Following her PhD, Panitch accepted a postdoctoral fellowship at the ETH Zurich and the University of Zurich.

== Career ==
Upon finishing her postdoctoral fellowship, Panitch returned to the United States to begin her first faculty position in 1999. As an assistant professor in bioengineering at Arizona State University (ASU), Panitch collaborated with colleagues to develop a method to prevent constriction and keep the vein graft healthy during surgeries for clogged heart vessels. Her research focused on developing a gel to coat the vein and deliver the protein. Their work led to the establishment of Arizona Engineered Therapeutics Inc. (known as AzERx) to work on creating a drug to help relax smooth muscle tissue and help with blood flow.

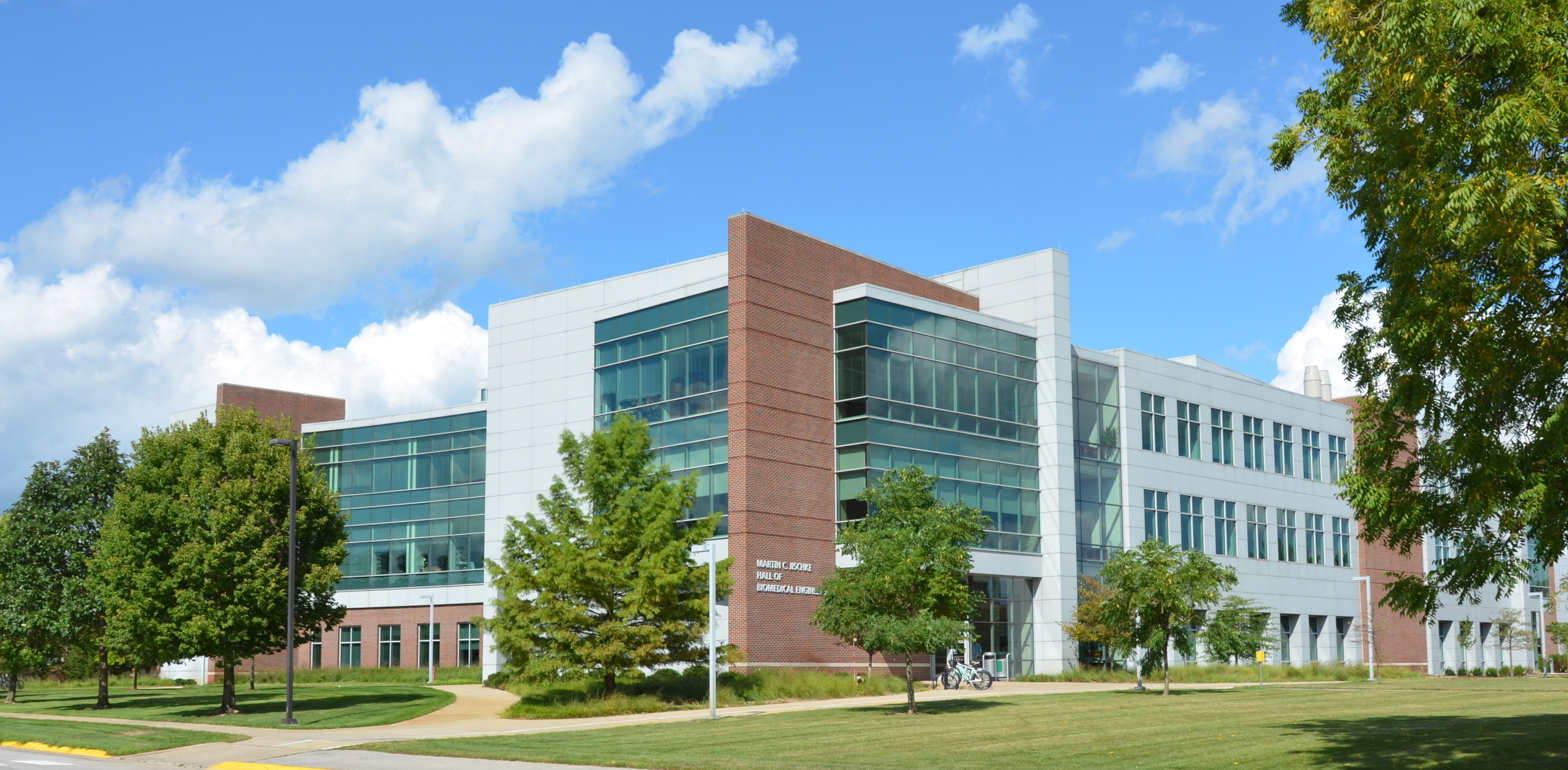
A photo of Purdue University's Weldon School of Biomedical Engineering where Panitch worked from 2006 to 2016.

Panitch eventually left ASU in 2006 to become an associate professor in Purdue University's Weldon School of Biomedical Engineering where she continued her research on regenerative medicine. Upon joining the faculty, Panitch began developing materials designed to be injected into the body in order to repair damaged bones, spinal cords, arteries and other tissues. Following this, Panitch was named one of four University Faculty Scholars from the College of Engineering in recognition of her scholarship. At the same time, Panitch also sat on the editorial advisory board for the journals Biomacromolecules and Biomatter.

In 2008, Panitch joined the National Institute of Health, where she served on the biomaterials and biointerfaces study section until 2012.

In 2010, Panitch was appointed the inaugural faculty entrepreneur-in-residence at Discovery Park's Burton D. Morgan Center for Entrepreneurship as "a resource for university faculty, staff and students looking to start a company from their work or research at Purdue." At the same time, she co-taught Purdue's graduate class in biomedical entrepreneurship with George R. Wodicka, Tim Folta, and Keith March. Upon concluding her appointment as faculty entrepreneur-in-residence in 2012, Panitch was appointed the Leslie A. Geddes Professor in Biomedical Engineering and was elected to the American Institute for Medical and Biological Engineering.

During her later tenure at the institution, Panitch continued to focus on designing biopolymers that improve tissue healing and regeneration by researching intracellular and extracellular approaches to direct molecular and cellular processes. In 2014, she became the founding director of Deliberate Innovation for Faculty (DIFF) to assist in mentoring Purdue innovators who have an interest in translating their inventions to the public through commercialization, collaboration, or entrepreneurship. The following year, Panitch was elected a Fellow of the Biomedical Engineering Society for her "exceptional achievements in the field of biomedical engineering." She was also elected to the National Academy of Inventors and appointed vice provost for faculty affairs at Purdue.

In June 2016, Panitch left Purdue to join the Department of Biomedical Engineering at the University of California, Davis. Upon joining the faculty, she was the recipient of a 2019 Science Translation and Innovative Research Grant to help fund her research with ischemia-reperfusion injury. As her research team had already begun in vivo research, the grant was used to study doses as she prepared for human clinical trials. The following year, Panitch received the CTSC Pilot Translation and Clinical Studies Program's Highly Innovative Award to assist her in using one's hollow nanoparticle system to treat osteoarthritis in vivo. She also joined colleagues Aijun Wang and Kit S. Lam to establish VasoBio Inc. after they identified a molecule and developed a new technology to coat the graft and maintain vein health during standard vascular access grafts for dialysis.

Panitch is still working as a researcher with Emory University, where in March 2026, she contributed to the research of molecular and antiangiogenic effects paclitaxel-loaded nanoparticles. This laboratory demonstrates how nanoparticle type and composition influence the molecular effects and in vivo antiangiogenic activity of PTX, where they found that nanocarriers not only act as delivery systems but may also confer additional biological effects that may contribute to PTX cytotoxicity.

== Publications ==
- Lowe, N. M., Nguyen, B. B., Mizenko, R. R., Trushchankova, A., Hadley, D. J., Panitch, A., & Carney, R. P. (2025). Loading of therapeutic cell penetrating peptides into extracellular vesicles for pulmonary fibrosis. Journal of Controlled Release, 114561.
- Dartora, V. F., Carney, R., Wang, A., Qiu, P., & Panitch, A. (2025). Extracellular matrix ligands modulate the endothelial progenitor cell secretome for enhanced angiogenesis. Acta Biomaterialia, 195, 240–255.
- Battistoni, C. M., Briones, J. M., Brubaker, D. K., Panitch, A., & Liu, J. C. (2025). Chondrogenic and chondroprotective response of composite collagen I/II-hyaluronic acid scaffolds within an inflammatory osteoarthritic environment. Biomaterials Science, 13(12), 3252–3263.
- Casella, A., Lowen, J., Griffin, K. H., Shimamoto, N., Ramos-Rodriguez, D. H., Panitch, A., & Leach, J. K. (2024). Conductive Microgel Annealed Scaffolds Enhance Myogenic Potential of Myoblastic Cells. Advanced healthcare materials, 13(25), e2302500.
- Nguyen, M., Battistoni, C. M., Babiak, P. M., Liu, J. C., & Panitch, A. (2024). Chondroitin sulfate/hyaluronic acid-blended hydrogels suppress chondrocyte inflammation under pro-inflammatory conditions. ACS Biomaterials Science & Engineering, 10(5), 3242–3254.
- Passos, J. S., Lopes, L. B., & Panitch, A. (2023). Collagen-binding nanoparticles for paclitaxel encapsulation and breast cancer treatment. ACS Biomaterials Science & Engineering, 9(12), 6805–6820.
