= Cosier =

Cosier is a surname. Notable people with the surname include:

- Gary Cosier (born 1953), Australian cricketer
- Michelle Cosier (born 1982), Australian basketball player
- Richard A. Cosier (born 1947), American academic

== See also ==
- Cosier-Murphy House, historic house in Connecticut
