= Panitch =

Panitch is a surname. Notable people with the surname include:

- Alyssa Panitch, American biomedical engineer
- Leo Panitch (1945–2020), Canadian political scientist
- Sanford Panitch, American film industry executive
