= Sherry Harbin =

Professor

- Born: Indiana, United States
- Spouse: Scot A. Harbin (m. 1994)

Academic background
- Education: BSc, Biochemistry, 1987, Indiana University Bloomington; MS, Electrical Engineering, 1989, PhD, Veterinary Physiology and Pharmacology, 1992, Purdue University

Academic work
- Institutions: Weldon School of Biomedical Engineering

Sherry Lynn Voytik-Harbin is a professor in the Weldon School of Biomedical Engineering and Department of Basic Medical Sciences at Purdue University.

== Early life and education ==
Harbin was born and raised in Indiana. As a senior at Central High School, she won the State Scholarly Writing Contest and was the recipient of a Storer Scholarship for Indiana University Bloomington. Upon graduating in 1987, Harbin was expected to enroll at Harvard University and the Dana–Farber Cancer Institute for graduate work in experimental pathology but instead chose to explore Purdue University. She made contact with Pete Konrad and they discussed opportunities in biomedical engineering which convinced her to enroll at the institution. As a doctoral student, she was the recipient of a $500 Geddes-Laufman-Greatbatch Scholarship due to her academic performance.

== Career ==
Harbin joined the faculty of Weldon School of Biomedical Engineering in 2003 as a full-time professor of biomedical engineering and basic medical sciences. In this role, she studied tissue engineering on the Extra-Cellular Matrix to understand the behavior of the reactions. She was later promoted to Associate Professor with tenure in 2006. Harbin was later selected for the 2008 Entrepreneurial Leadership Academy. Harbin continued to research the use of decellularized tissue scaffolds for tissue restoration in human patients and was nominated to the Purdue Innovator Hall of Fame in 2014. Her research laboratory developed collagen formulations that self-assemble to form fibrils that resemble those found in the body's tissues, which could then be used in creating tissue-engineered medical products as well as in-vitro 3D tissue systems for basic research, drug development, and chemical toxicity testing. She was subsequently elected a Fellow of the National Academy of Inventors and named a University Faculty Scholar as an "outstanding faculty member who are on an accelerated path for academic distinction in the discovery and dissemination of knowledge."

During the COVID-19 pandemic, Harbin was elected a Fellow of the American Institute for Medical and Biological Engineering for "developing collagen formulations that rapidly self-assemble at physiological conditions into a mechanically and proteolytic stable material that promotes tissue regeneration." The following year, she collaborated with Stacey Halum to lead a research team in develop tissue-engineered component tissue replacements that support the reconstruction of the larynx.

== Personal life ==
Harbin married Scot A. Harbin in 1994 in Indiana.
