= Yang Hao (engineer) =

Engineer

Yang Hao FREng
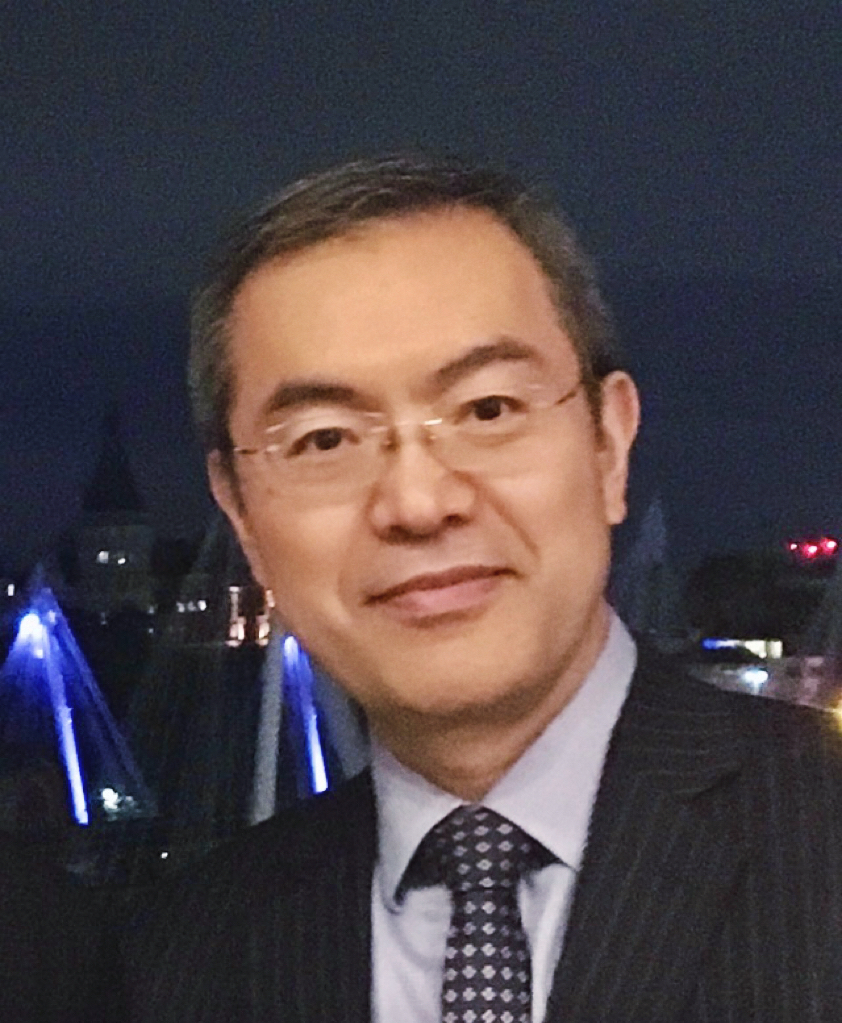
- Education: BSc., Applied Physics (1989); PhD., Electrical and Electronic Engineering (1998)
- Alma mater: Shandong University; University of Bristol
- Scientific career
- Workplaces: Queen Mary University of London (QMUL); University of Birmingham; University of Bristol

Yang Hao is a British Chinese electronic engineer, academic, and author most known for his research in Wireless connectivity and metamaterials. He is the holder of the QinetiQ/Royal Academy of Engineering (RAE) Research Chair, and serves as the Director of both the EPSRC Research Centre on Future Wireless Connectivity and the EPSRC Centre for Transformation Optics and Metamaterials. He is also a professor of Antennas and Electromagnetics, and served as the Deputy Vice Principal for Strategic Research and Dean of Research of the Faculty of Science and Engineering at Queen Mary University of London (QMUL). He co-founded a satellite communication company called Isotropic Systems.

Hao has authored/edited two books titled, FDTD Modeling of Metamaterials: Theory and Applications and Antennas and Propagation for dy-Centric Wireless Communications. He has been the recipient of the BAE Systems Chairman's Silver Award, the Royal Society Wolfson Research Merit Award, the IET AF Harvey Research Prize, and the EurAAP Antenna Award.

Hao became a Fellow of the ERA Foundation in 2007, the IET in 2010, the IEEE in 2013, and the Royal Academy of Engineering (RAEng) in 2020. He served as editor-in-chief for IEEE Antennas and Wireless Propagation Letters, and founded an open-access journal, EPJ Applied Metamaterials, where he serves as editor-in-chief, while also serving as Vice President of the Publication Committee for IEEE Antennas and Propagation Society. He is a member of the Fellowship Committee, Research Committee, and Enterprise Hub for the RAEng as well.

== Education and early career ==
Hao earned his Ph.D. from the Centre for Communications Research (CCR) at the University of Bristol in 1998. Following this, he worked as a postdoctoral research fellow in the School of Electrical and Electronic Engineering at University of Birmingham, from 1998 to 2000. In May 2000, he joined the Antenna and Electromagnetics Group in the School of Electronic Engineering and Computer Science at QMUL, initially as a lecturer, advancing to Reader in 2005, and eventually becoming a professor in 2007.

== Career ==
Hao's research focuses on wireless communication, metamaterials, antennas, terahertz technology, and adaptive systems. He has headed projects such as the EPSRC/QinetiQ DREAM Prosperity Partnership, the EPSRC QUEST Programme Grant, and ANIMATE project. In his role as QinetiQ/Royal Academy of Engineering Research Chair, he has contributed to the advancement of wireless technology, while also co-founding Isotropic Systems (All.Space) to apply research in satellite communication. Additionally, he served on the EPSRC SAT (Strategic Advisory Team), emphasizing the importance of ICT, electronics, and manufacturing, and holds positions on the management boards of the AI for Science and Government program at the Alan Turing Institute, and the Cambridge Graphene Centre, as well as on the boards of the European School of Antenna Excellence, Virtual Institute for Artificial Electromagnetic Materials and Metamaterials, Metamorphose VI AISBL, and International Advisory Committee (IAC) of the Comin Labs.

Hao has held roles such as Deputy Vice Principal for Strategic Research at QMUL since 2021, and Dean for Research at the Faculty of Science and Engineering from 2018 to 2021. He has also been an Elected University Council Member and Governance Committee Member since 2021.

== Research ==
Hao developed integrated antenna solutions using novel materials for security, aerospace, and healthcare, such as lens antennas for satellite communications and supply chain establishment. He co-developed stable active non-Foster metamaterial for small antennas and coined the term "body-centric wireless communications," which involves integrating wearable and implantable sensors. His early research in metamaterials, transformation optics, and AI-driven robotics for precise wave control has impacted electromagnetic devices and medical communication technology. This work has been featured by media outlets such as CNN, Telegraph, Financial Times, and IEEE Spectrum.

=== Body-centric wireless communications and wearable antennas ===
In 2003, Hao and his colleague conducted research, becoming the first to explore the characterization of the human body as a communication medium. Their work revealed that radio signals travelling across the body's surface experience considerable signal loss and variations in propagation time, known as dispersion. He noted that antennas placed on the body suffer from decreased efficiency, altered radiation patterns, and impedance fluctuations. To address these challenges, his focus shifted towards using surface and creeping waves for on-body communication among sensors. Concurrently, he developed a theoretical framework for modeling these waves in the presence of the human body and proceeded to design antennas tailored for reliable on-body communication, using precise and realistic models.

In addition to on-body channel modelling studies, Hao pioneered the exploration of on-body antennas across frequencies ranging from 10 MHz to 100 GHz. His research laid the foundation for designing low-profile antennas capable of reliably facilitating on-body communications, and engineered various body-worn antennas featuring spatial diversity at UHF/VHF and UWB frequencies. In particular, antennas operating at 60 GHz and 94 GHz were developed to support on/off-body communications, particularly in defense and healthcare sectors. Throughout his research journey, he has developed RF modeling methods tailored for body-centric wireless communication. He integrated Huygens' principle into FDTD algorithms for precise analysis of on-body radio propagation, and while emphasizing the significance of human-specific modelling, devised commercial tools for designing wearable and implantable sensors.

=== Metamaterials and transformation optics ===
To support his efforts in antenna design, Hao pioneered the development of a set of computational tools in 2005 for modelling microwave metamaterials. He also explored the properties of a hyperbolic wire medium lens, which contributed to the reduction in mass, footprint, and profile of reconfigurable intelligent surfaces (RIS). His work on metamaterials and transformational optics, published in leading journals such as Physics Review Letters, Nature Communications, and IEEE Transactions, focused on applications to antennas and propagation. Notably, in 2018, his collaborative research introduced an approach to antenna design using transformation optics. He demonstrated the feasibility of manufacturing satellite antennas in various shapes using flat surfaces and thin nanomaterial layers via 3D printing, offering cost-effective, compact, and resilient designs. In 2009, he developed a manufacturing process for free-formed 3D woodpile structures operating at sub-THz frequencies, initially used for concealed weapon detection and later realized through 3D additive manufacturing.

=== Antenna design and integration of emerging technologies ===
Hao's later work has focused on innovating antenna design, materials science, and integrating emerging technologies like machine learning into electromagnetics. He introduced a concept involving hyperuniform disordered antenna arrays and metasurfaces to enhance spectral and spatial performance. Employing Natural Language Processing (NLP) tools, he applied machine learning techniques to forecast trends in antennas and propagation research using vast unstructured data. Additionally, in two journal papers published in Advanced Science and npj Computational Materials, he applied unsupervised deep learning to identify disordered material signatures in perovskites, facilitating predictions on crystal symmetry and phase transitions, and introduced a graph-based machine learning model to analyze material properties, advancing computational materials for antenna applications.

== Awards and honours ==
- 2005 – CRUCIBLE Award, NESTA
- 2010 – Fellow, IET
- 2013 – Fellow, IEEE
- 2013 – AF Harvey Research Prize, IET
- 2013-2017 – Wolfson Research Merit Award, Royal Society
- 2014 – Chairman's Silver Award, BAE Systems
- 2020 – Fellow, RAEng
- 2024 – EurAAP Antenna Award, European Association of Antennas and Propagation (EurAAP)
- 2024 - Fred W. Ellersick Prize, The IEEE Communications Society
- 2024 – John Kraus Antenna Award, the IEEE Antennas and Propagation Society
- 2026 – Booker Gold Medal, the International Union of Radio Science (Union Radio-Scientifique Internationale)
- 2026 – IEEE Neal Shepherd Memorial Best Propagation Paper Award, IEEE Vehicular Technology Society, for “Pervasive Wireless Channel Modeling Theory and Applications to 6G GBSMs for All Frequency Bands and All Scenarios”, published in IEEE Transactions on Vehicular Technology, vol. 71, no. 9, pp. 9159–9173 (September 2022).

== Bibliography ==
=== Books ===
- FDTD Modeling of Metamaterials: Theory and Applications (2008) ISBN 9781596931602
- Antennas and Propagation for Body-Centric Wireless Communications (2012) ISBN 9781608073764

=== Selected articles ===
- Hall, P. S., & Hao, Y. (2006, November). Antennas and propagation for body centric communications. In 2006 First European Conference on Antennas and Propagation (pp. 1–7). IEEE.
- Hao, Y., Alomainy, A., & Zhao, Y. (2006). Antenna design and propagation measurements and modelling for UWB wireless BAN. Ultra‐Wideband, 331–359.
- Hao, Y., & Foster, R. (2008). Wireless body sensor networks for health-monitoring applications. Physiological measurement, 29(11), R27.
- Argyropoulos, C., Zhao, Y., Kallos, E., & Hao, Y. (2010). Finite-Difference Time-Domain Modeling of Electromagnetic Cloaks. Metamaterials: Theory, Design, and Applications, 115–153.
- Pan, C., Ren, H., Wang, K., Kolb, J. F., Elkashlan, M., Chen, M., ... & Hanzo, L. (2021). Reconfigurable intelligent surfaces for 6G systems: Principles, applications, and research directions. IEEE Communications Magazine, 59(6), 14–20.
