= Steven Gao =

Chinese electrical engineer (born 1972)

Steven Shichang Gao (also called "Steven Gao"; Chinese: 高式昌) is a Professor of Electronic Engineering. His research mainly includes antennas, MIMO, intelligent antennas and phased arrays for mobile and satellite communications, navigation and sensing.

He obtained a Doctorate degree at Shanghai University in 1999. He completed Post-Doctoral research at the National University of Singapore and subsequently moved to the United Kingdom in 2001 to work as a Research Fellow at the University of Birmingham. The following year, he began teaching at Northumbria University as a Senior Lecturer and was promoted to a Reader in 2006. In 2007, he moved to Surrey Space Center at the University of Surrey, and from 2013 to 2022, worked at the University of Kent as a Professor and Chair of RF and Microwave Engineering. Since Sep 2022, he joined the Chinese University of Hong Kong, Hong Kong, as a Professor and the Director of Center for intelligent Electromagnetic Systems. Since 2023, Prof. Gao serves as the Editor-in-Chief of the journal IEEE Antennas and Wireless Propagation Letters.

Prof Gao is a Fellow of the Institute of Electrical and Electronics Engineers, the Royal Aeronautical Society, and the Institution of Engineering and Technology.
