= Richard A. Cosier =

American academic

Dean of the Krannert School of Management at Purdue University
- In office August 1, 1999 – June 30, 2010
- Preceded by: Dennis Weidenaar
- Succeeded by: Jerry Lynch (Interim)

Personal details
- Born: May 18, 1947 (age 79) Jackson, Michigan
- Education: Michigan State University; Loyola University Chicago; University of Iowa

Richard A. Cosier (born May 18, 1947) is an American academic. He is Leeds Professor of Management and Co-Director, Burton D. Morgan Center for Entrepreneurship. He was the Dean of the Krannert School of Management at Purdue University from August 1, 1999 to June 30, 2010. In the 1990s, Cosier was dean of the Michael F. Price College of Business at the University of Oklahoma. He was the 2008-2009 chair of the Association to Advance Collegiate Schools of Business in Tampa, Florida.

He received his Bachelor of Arts degree from the School of Packaging at Michigan State University in 1969, his Master of Business Administration from Loyola University Chicago in 1972 and his PhD from the University of Iowa in 1975.

Cosier serves on the Board of Directors of Kite Realty Group in Indianapolis, Indiana and Roll Coater Inc., also based in Indianapolis. He has served on the Board of Directors for First Fidelity Bank, N.A. of Oklahoma City, Oklahoma, Century, Inc. of Midwest City, Oklahoma, and Bank One of Lafayette, Indiana.

Cosier stepped down as dean of Krannert effective June 30, 2010. He will retain his position as Leeds Professor of Management and became the Avrum and Joyce Gray Director of the Burton D. Morgan Center for Entrepreneurship at Purdue beginning January 1, 2011 following a six-month sabbatical in the fall of 2010.
