= Gianluca Lazzi =

Italian electrical engineer

Gianluca Lazzi is an Italian electrical engineer.

Lazzi graduated from the Sapienza University of Rome in 1994 with a Dr. Eng. in electrical engineering and completed a PhD in the same subject at the University of Utah in 1998. Lazzi began his teaching career at North Carolina State University in 1999 as an assistant professor, advancing to associate and full professor of electrical and computer engineering in 2003 and 2006, respectively. In 2008, Lazzi was elected a fellow of the Institute of Electrical and Electronics Engineers' Engineering in Medicine and Biology Society, and began his first year as chief editor of the journal IEEE Antennas and Wireless Propagation Letters. Beginning in 2009, he returned to the University of Utah as USTAR Professor and chair of the electrical and computer engineering department. Lazzi remained chief editor of AWPL through 2013, and was elected a fellow of the American Institute for Medical and Biological Engineering in 2014. At the University of Southern California, Lazzi is affiliated with the Keck School of Medicine, the Viterbi School of Engineering, and the Marshall School of Business. He holds the Provost Professorship of Ophthalmology, Electrical Engineering, Clinical Entrepreneurship and Biomedical Engineering alongside the Fred H. Cole Professorship in Engineering.
