= IEEE Antennas and Wireless Propagation Letters =

- Discipline: Antennas and wireless propagation
- Language: English
- Edited by: Steven Gao

Publication details
- History: 2002-present
- Publisher: IEEE Antennas & Propagation Society
- Frequency: Continuous
- Impact factor: 4.2 (2022)

Standard abbreviations
- ISO 4: IEEE Antennas Wirel. Propag. Lett.

Indexing
- CODEN: IAWPA7
- ISSN: 1536-1225
- LCCN: 2001211737
- OCLC no.: 50289256

Links
- Journal homepage; Online access

IEEE Antennas and Wireless Propagation Letters is a peer-reviewed scientific journal with the goal of rapid dissemination of short manuscripts in the antennas and wireless propagation domains. It is an official journal of the IEEE Antennas & Propagation Society. The current editor-in-chief is Steven Gao (Chinese University of Hong Kong).

== Abstracting and indexing ==
The journal is abstracted and indexed in the Science Citation Index Expanded and Current Contents/Engineering, Computing & Technology. According to the Journal Citation Reports, the journal had a 2022 impact factor of 4.2.

== History ==
The journal was established in 2002 with Piergiorgio Uslenghi (University of Illinois at Chicago) as the founding editor-in-chief. He was succeeded in 2008 by Gianluca Lazzi (University of Utah). Yang Hao (Queen Mary University of London) served as editor-in-chief from 2014. After Yang stepped down, Christophe Fumeaux (University of Adelaide) assumed the editorship between 2017 and 2022.
