= Biomet =

American medical device manufacturer

Biomet, Inc.
- Company type: Private
- Industry: Health Care
- Founded: Warsaw, IN, USA (1977)
- Headquarters: Warsaw, IN, USA
- Key people: Dane Miller, Founder
- Products: Oxford Partial Knee, LactoSorb
- Owner: Blackstone Group, Goldman Sachs, Kohlberg Kravis Roberts, TPG Capital
- Number of employees: 9,200 (2007)
- Website: www.biomet.com

Biomet, Inc., was a medical device manufacturer located in the Warsaw, Indiana, business cluster. The company specialized in reconstructive products for orthopedic surgery, neurosurgery, craniomaxillofacial surgery and operating room supplies. In 2015, Biomet became part of the new company Zimmer Biomet.

== History ==
Biomet was established in 1977 and delivered its first hip replacement in 1978. The four founders of Biomet were: Dane A. Miller, Ray Harroff, Niles Noblitt, and Jerry Ferguson. In a September 2007 club deal, the company was acquired by a consortium of private equity firms consisting of The Blackstone Group, Goldman Sachs, Kohlberg Kravis Roberts L.P. and TPG Capital, after which Biomet ceased trading on NASDAQ.

In April 2014, it was announced that Zimmer Holdings had succeeded in a bid to acquire Biomet for a fee of $13.4 billion. However, in October 2014, EU antitrust regulators opened an investigation into Zimmer's bid on the grounds that the deal may lead to substantial decreases in competition in certain markets. The verdict of the investigation into the deal that would make Zimmer the world's second-largest seller of orthopaedic products behind Johnson & Johnson allowed the merger to take place in June 2015.

== Products ==
Biomet manufactured reconstructive products for orthopedic surgery, such as hips, knees and shoulders, fixation devices, orthopedic support devices. It also made spinal implants, dental implants, and general operating instruments. Its subsidiary, Biomet Microfixation, manufactured mainly craniomaxillofacial and neurosurgical products. These included LactoSorb, a fixation system made of completely resorbable material for guided bone regeneration, titanium plates and screws for craniomaxillofacial fixation, instruments for craniomaxillofacial and orthopedic procedures and hard tissue replacements made out of biocompatible polymers, as used in cranial defects. Biomet began using polymethylmethacrylate (PMMA) beads, which are fused together with polyhydroxyethylmethacrylate (PHEMA) for cranial plates, in 1993. The other material is polyetherketoneketone (PEKK), formed either by laser sintering or by 3D printing.

== Misconduct ==
In 2012, Biomet paid more than $22 million to settle SEC and Department of Justice violations of the Foreign Corrupt Practices Act (FCPA). From 2000 to August 2008 Biomet bribed publicly employed doctors in Argentina, Brazil, and China with up to 15-20% of the sale. The four subsidiaries involved were Biomet Argentina SA, U.S. subsidiary Biomet International, Biomet China and Scandimed AB.

Incomplete section. In 2017 Biomet was again convicted. This second conviction was backed by another violation of the FCPA that was discovered in 2013.

These violations are also correlated with the first time a whistleblower received monetary compensation for reporting an entity to the SEC that led to a successful conviction.
