= Debendra Mallik =

American electrical engineer

Debendra Mallik is an electrical engineer at Intel Corporation in Chandler, Arizona. He was named a Fellow of the Institute of Electrical and Electronics Engineers (IEEE) in 2015 for his contributions to microprocessor packaging.
