= On-body wireless =

On-body wireless or body-centric wireless is the interconnection and networking of wearable computer system components and sensors through a system of transceivers, space wave antennas, and surface guided wave antennas for telemetry and telecommunications. The technique uses the surface of the human body as a transmission medium or path for electromagnetic waves. The topic of body-centric wireless networks (BCWN) can be divided into three main domains based on wireless sensor nodes placement, i.e., communication between the nodes that are on the body surface; communication from the body-surface to nearby base station; and at least one node may be implanted within the body. These three domains have been called on-body, off-body and in-body, respectively. The performance analysis of on-body wireless communication for different sporting activities has been reported.

== See also ==
- Wireless Sensor Networks
- Internet of Things
