= Dane A. Miller =

American business executive

Dane A. Miller (c. 1946 – February 10, 2015) was an American business executive. Miller was co-founder of the orthopedic company Biomet and was its president and chief executive from 1978 to 2006.

Miller was brought up in Springfield, Ohio, and obtained a Bachelor of Science degree in Mechanical Materials Science Engineering in 1969 from the General Motors Institute (now Kettering University) from which he received the Distinguished Alumnus award in 2010. He subsequently obtained a master's degree and a doctorate in Materials Science (Biomedical Engineering) from the University of Cincinnati. After working for rival companies Zimmer and Cutter Laboratories, Miller joined with Niles Noblitt, Jerry L. Ferguson and M. Ray Harroff, to found Biomet in 1977. Miller's own grandmother, Grace Shumaker, was the first recipient of a Biomet hip implant. To encourage public confidence in titanium as a material for implants, Miller arranged for a surgeon to introduce a piece into his own arm, which he left there for ten years to test its safety.

In March 2006, Miller was removed from the company's board of directors, and his retirement was announced. A few months later, he headed a private equity consortium that bought back the business for $11.4 billion and still owned it in 2014. Miller became a consultant to the new company in addition to resuming the role of a director. The company later announced a merger with Zimmer Holdings.
