= Allison Okamura =

American mechanical engineer

Allison Mariko Okamura is an American mechanical engineer and roboticist whose research concerns haptic technology, teleoperation, remote surgery, and robot-assisted surgery. She is the Richard W. Weiland Professor in the School of Engineering and a professor of mechanical engineering at Stanford University, where she directs the Collaborative Haptics and Robotics in Medicine (CHARM) laboratory and maintains a courtesy appointment as professor of computer science.

== Education and career ==
Okamura was born in Fontana, California, and grew up in Riverside, California. She majored in mechanical engineering at the University of California, Berkeley, graduating in 1994. She went to Stanford University for graduate study in mechanical engineering, working with Mark Cutkosky; she earned a master's degree there in 1996, and completed her Ph.D. in 2000.

She joined the mechanical engineering department at Johns Hopkins University as an assistant professor in 2000, eventually earning a promotion to full professor there. She returned to Stanford University as a faculty member in 2011, in part to solve a two-body problem with her husband's academic career.

She served as editor-in-chief of the journal IEEE Robotics and Automation Letters from 2018 to 2021.

== Recognition ==
Okamura won the National Science Foundation CAREER Award in 2004, the Early Career Award of the IEEE Robotics and Automation Society in 2005, and the Early Career Award of the IEEE Technical Committee on Haptics in 2009. She was named an IEEE Fellow in 2011, "for contributions to the design and control of haptic systems and medical robotics". In 2020, Okamura received the IEEE Engineering in Medicine and Biology Society Technical Achievement Award "for break-through technological developments in the field of medical robotics, including designing novel haptic feedback to enhance human performance and opening new pathways for soft robotics".
