= Weldon School of Biomedical Engineering =

Purdue University Weldon School of Biomedical Engineering
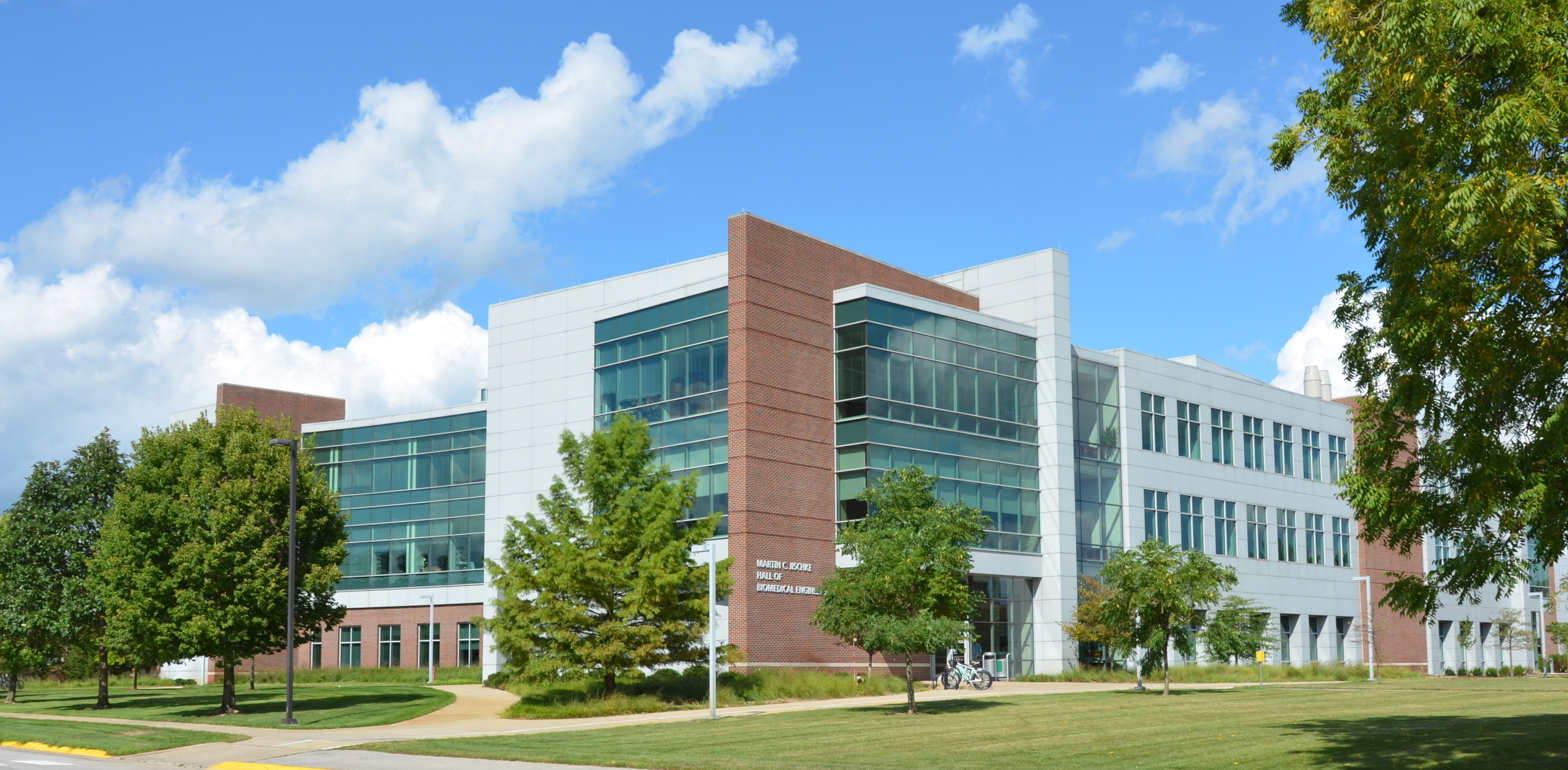
- Established: 2004
- Affiliations: Purdue University
- Dane A. Miller Head: George R. Wodicka
- Academic staff: 30
- Students: 450
- Location: 206 S. Martin C. Jischke Dr; West Lafayette, IN 47907-2032, West Lafayette, Indiana, USA; 40.422180°N 86.921044°W

The Weldon School of Biomedical Engineering is a department-level school within the College of Engineering at Purdue University.

The school offers undergraduate, graduate, and doctoral degrees. It is in a partnership with the Indiana University School of Medicine and offers a Doctor of Medicine–Master of Science in Biomedical Engineering combined degree program with that school.

== History ==
In 1974, Hillenbrand Biomedical Engineering Center was created. The center was headed by Dr. Leslie A. Geddes and located in Purdue's A.A. Potter Engineering Center. In 1998, the Hillenbrand Biomedical Engineering Center was elevated in status to the Department of Biomedical Engineering within the College of Engineering at Purdue. George R. Wodicka was the department's founding head. After a $10 million donation by Norman Weldon, an alumnus of Purdue, and his family, the department was formally expanded into a school of biomedical engineering. The donation provided for hiring additional faculty, research initiatives and other start-up costs. In honor of Weldon's donation, the school is named the Weldon School of Biomedical Engineering.

In 2006, the Weldon School moved from Potter Center to a new Biomedical Engineering Building on Purdue's campus. The building was renamed the Martin C. Jischke Hall of Biomedical Engineering after the former president of Purdue University.

Dr. Geddes remained on staff as a Professor Emeritus until his death in 2009. George R. Wodicka is the head of the School.

== Research areas ==
The Weldon School of Biomedical Engineering focuses research in four signature areas.

- Engineered Biomaterials and Biomechanics
- Imaging
- Instrumentation
- Quantitative Cellular & Systems Engineering

== Degrees offered ==
=== Undergraduate ===
- Bachelor of Science in Biomedical Engineering (BSBME)

=== Graduate ===
==== PhD Options ====
- Biomedical Engineering PhD (post-BS or post-MS options)
- Interdisciplinary Biomedical Sciences PhD
- Combined Clinical MD-PhD BME (MSTP; partnership with IUSM)
- Bioengineering Interdisciplinary Training in Diabetes Research Program (BTDR)
- Interdisciplinary Training Program in Auditory Neuroscience (TPAN)

==== MS Options ====
- MS Biomedical Engineering (MS BME, with thesis)
- Fifth-Year Combined BS/MS in Biomedical Engineering (thesis option)
- Fifth-Year Combined BS/MS Professional Master's (coursework only)
- MS BME Professional Master's (coursework only)
- Concurrent MS BME and MBA
- Combined MS BME and MD (in partnership with the IU School of Medicine)
- MSE/MS with Concentration in Biomedical Engineering

== Facilities ==
In 2006, Purdue University opened a new facility for the Weldon School of Biomedical Engineering. The building cost $25 million and was financed in part by grants from the Whitaker Foundation and the State of Indiana. The building is located in Purdue's Discovery Park near Lynn Hall of Veterinary Medicine, Birck Nanotechnology Center, Burton D. Morgan Center for Entrepreneurship, Bindley Bioscience Center, and Lilly Hall of Life Sciences. The building houses the academic and head offices for the School, learning spaces, research labs, faculty offices, conference rooms, and a computer lab. The facility was expanded in 2019.
