= D. Wade Clapp =

Chairman of the department of pediatrics

- Born: Marysville, Indiana, US
- Spouse: Nancy L. Swigonski

Academic background
- Education: BA, 1977, Hanover College; MD, 1982, Indiana University School of Medicine

David Wade Clapp is an American pediatric physician-scientist. He is the chair of the Department of Pediatrics at Indiana University School of Medicine and also the Physician-in-Chief at Riley Hospital for Children at Indiana University Health.

== Early life and education ==
Clapp was born and raised a mile outside of Marysville, Indiana and was one of 46 graduates in his rural consolidated high school class. While attending Hanover College for his undergraduate degree, Clapp spent a summer working with children with learning disabilities. Following college, he earned his medical degree at Indiana University School of Medicine and completed a neonatology fellowship at Case Western Reserve University.

== Career ==
Upon joining the faculty at Indiana University, Clapp was one of the first faculty recruited to join the Herman B Wells Center For Research in 1991. During this time, he worked alongside Maureen Harrington to develop and formalize IU's medical degree and PhD track program. Clapp also focused on the genetic control of hematopoiesis with a specific interest in the role of the hematopoietic system in children with a predisposition to bone marrow failure and cancer. In 2001, he was elected a member of the American Society for Clinical Investigation.

In 2008, Clapp and colleagues discovered that the drug Gleevec had the possibility to be the first effective therapy for neurofibromatosis type 1 tumor. Following this, Clapp was named the Chairman of the IU Pediatrics Department while continuing to serve as the Freida and Albrecht Kipp Professor of Pediatrics and a professor of microbiology and immunology. In this role, he oversaw the establishment of a national research project to develop new treatments for diseases of a genetic mutation.

In October 2020, Clapp was elected a Member of the National Academy of Medicine for "work that has led to fundamental new insights into the pathogenesis of neurofibromatosis and improved lives for children and adults with this disorder." He was also awarded the Children's Tumor Foundation's Friedrich von Recklinghausen Award as someone who has made significant contributions to neurofibromatosis research or clinical care. In 2021, Clapp was one of 11 IU faculty members named distinguished professors.

== Personal life ==
Clapp is married to Nancy L. Swigonski, a fellow professor at Indiana University, and they have three sons together.
