= J. Stewart Aitchison =

Scottish scientist and IEEE fellow

J. Stewart Aitchison FRSC is a Scottish scientist and researcher in the area of photonics. Aitchson is known for his work on nonlinear optics. He is professor in the University of Toronto's Electrical and Computer Engineering department. Aitchson was made an IEEE fellow in 2019.

== Education ==
Aitchison gained his Bachelor's degree in 1984 from Heriot-Watt University. In 1987, he received his PhD from Heriot-Watt.

== Career ==
Aitchison is a renowned scientist in the field of nonlinear optics. He has written over 250 journal articles. Aitchison is professor of photonics at the University of Toronto's Electrical and Computer Engineering department and Theme Lead in Public Health at IC-IMPACTS. Aitchison previously served as the director of the university's Emerging Communications Technology Institute (2004-2007) and Vice-Dean of the Faculty of Applied Science & Engineering (2007-2012).

At the University of Glasgow, he served as a lecturer from 1990 and became professor of photonics in 1999. He left Glasgow in 2001 to join the University of Toronto.

== Awards and honours ==
- Fellow of Institute of Physics, 2001
- Fellow of Optica, 2005
- Fellow of the American Association for the Advancement of Science, 2010
- Elevated to Fellow of the Royal Society of Canada in 2010
- 2012 University of Toronto Inventor of the Year
- Made corresponding fellow of the Royal Society of Edinburgh in 2014
- 2016 Ontario Professional Engineers Awards Engineering Medal
- 2016 Connaught Innovation Award
- IEEE Photonics Society Distinguished Lecturer from 2016-2017
- Made IEEE fellow in 2019 "for contributions to nonlinear optical devices and point-of-care testing systems"
