= Discovery Park (Purdue) =

Research park at Purdue University, Indiana, United States

Coordinates: 40°25′20.74″N 86°55′23.52″W

Discovery Park District at Purdue is a 400-acre mixed-use innovation district located at the western gateway of Purdue University's West Lafayette campus in the U.S. state of Indiana. The district is a $1 billion development project that includes research facilities, residential housing, commercial space, and corporate partnerships. The Purdue Research Foundation leads the development in partnership with Browning Investments LLC as master development partner.

Discovery Park District represents an expansion of the original Discovery Park concept established in 2001. While the original Discovery Park focused on interdisciplinary research facilities, Discovery Park District encompasses residential, commercial, retail, manufacturing, and research components. The district is located adjacent to the Purdue University Airport and near the Martin C. Jischke Hall of Biomedical Engineering and Ray W. Herrick Laboratories.

== History ==
The original Discovery Park was established in 2001 with donations from the Lilly Endowment totaling more than $50 million and support from the state of Indiana and private sources. The first interdisciplinary research buildings opened in 2004, with six research and office buildings constructed as part of the original Discovery Park complex. By 2014, the interdisciplinary institutes known as Discovery Park Institutes and Centers reached the $1 billion milestone in external sponsored research, private gifts and endowments.

In 2016, the Purdue Research Foundation selected Browning Investments as master development partner to expand the concept into the larger Discovery Park District encompassing approximately 400 acres. According to the Indiana Chamber of Commerce, $889.5 million in public investment and $1.5 billion in private-sector investment flowed into Greater Lafayette from 2015 to 2020, much of it through the Discovery Park District.

== Development components ==
=== Residential ===
The district includes several housing developments: Aspire at Discovery Park District, an 830-bed apartment complex that opened in 2019; Continuum, with 246 apartments and commercial space that began leasing in 2022; Provenance, a mixed-housing community with townhomes and single-family homes; and a Varcity residential development designed for older adults affiliated with the university.

=== Commercial and research ===
The Convergence Center for Innovation and Collaboration is a 145,000-square-foot, five-story mixed-use building that houses office space, retail, and co-working spaces. The district has attracted corporations including Rolls-Royce, Saab, Bayer, and Schweitzer Engineering Laboratories (SEL), which operates a 100,000-square-foot facility for electric power research.

=== Infrastructure ===
The district operates a private mobile network providing connectivity throughout the 400-acre development. The district includes bike paths, green spaces, and pedestrian infrastructure.

== Institutes and centers at Discovery Park District ==
The research component of Discovery Park District consists of interdisciplinary institutes and centers managed by Purdue's Office of Research. Dan DeLaurentis, Bruce Reese Professor of Aeronautics and Astronautics, serves as Executive Vice President for Research.

=== Core institutes and centers ===
- Center on AI for Digital, Autonomous, and Augmented Aviation (AIDA)
- Birck Nanotechnology Center
- Purdue Center for Global Food Security
- Center for Education and Research in Information Assurance and Security (CERIAS)
- Institute for a Sustainable Future (ISF)
- Network for Computational Nanotechnology (NCN)
- Purdue Electron Microscopy Center
- Purdue Policy Research Institute (PPRI)
- Purdue Quantum Science and Engineering Institute (PQSEI)

=== Health and life sciences cluster ===
- Bindley Bioscience Center
- Purdue Institute for Drug Discovery
- Purdue Institute for Cancer Research (PICR)
- Purdue Institute of Inflammation, Immunology and Infectious Disease (PI4D)
- Purdue Institute for Integrative Neuroscience (PIIN)
- William D. and Sherry L. Young Institute for the Advanced Manufacturing of Pharmaceuticals
- Eli Lilly and Company and Purdue University Research Alliance Center (LPRC)

=== Affiliated organizations ===
- Center for Innovative and Strategic Transformation of Alkane Resources (CISTAR)
- Center for Secure Microelectronics Ecosystem (CSME)
- Emergent Mechanisms in Biology of Robustness Integration and Organization Institute (EMBRIO)
- Joint Transportation Research Program (JTRP)
- Natural Hazards Engineering Research Infrastructure (NHERI-NCO)
- Rosen Center for Advanced Computing (RCAC)
- Scalable Asymmetric Lifecycle Engagement (SCALE)
- Women's Global Health Institute

== Research facilities ==
=== Bindley Bioscience Center ===
The Bindley Bioscience Center is a multidisciplinary research facility for life sciences and engineering collaboration. The facility provides shared laboratory space and scientific equipment for projects ranging from disease research to biofuels development. In 2012, the building was expanded by 29,000 square feet with the addition of the Multidisciplinary Cancer Research Facility.

=== Birck Nanotechnology Center ===
The Birck Nanotechnology Center is a 187,000-square-foot (17,400 m^{2}) research facility consisting of a 25,000-square-foot (2,300 m^{2}) nanofabrication ISO class 3 cleanroom, including a biocleanroom, heavy laboratory space, and office areas. The center focuses on nanotechnology research addressing applications in computing, communications, the environment, security, energy, and health.

=== Burton D. Morgan Center for Entrepreneurship ===
The Burton D. Morgan building houses Purdue's innovation, entrepreneurship, and commercialization programs, including the Office for Corporate and Global Partnerships. The Purdue Foundry, a commercialization hub launched in 2013, operates from this facility along with the Office of Technology Commercialization, the Certificate for Entrepreneurship and Innovation Program, and the Small Business Development Office.

=== Gerald D. and Edna E. Mann Hall ===
Gerald D. and Edna E. Mann Hall houses sustainability research programs and institutes.

=== Hall for Discovery and Learning Research ===
This building houses research centers focused on science and engineering education, computational nanotechnology, and materials science, supporting research in STEM learning.

=== Drug Discovery facilities ===
The Purdue Institute for Drug Discovery operates specialized facilities for pharmaceutical research and development.

=== Purdue Electron Microscopy Center ===
This facility provides electron microscopy capabilities for research across multiple disciplines.

== Economic impact ==
The development has generated investment and employment in aerospace, advanced manufacturing, and technology sectors in the Greater Lafayette region. The district's research facilities attract collaborators from Purdue's colleges and schools, regional campuses, and partner institutions including Indiana University. International research collaborations include partnerships with institutions in Australia, China, India, South Korea, and countries in Africa and South America.

== See also ==
- Purdue Research Park
- Purdue Research Foundation
