= Leslie A. Geddes =

Canadian-American physiologist and academic (1921–2009)

- Born: 24 May 1921; Scotland
- Died: 25 October 2009 (aged 88); West Lafayette, Indiana
- Awards: IEEE Edison Medal (1994)

Leslie Alexander Geddes (May 24, 1921 – October 25, 2009) was an electrical engineer and physiologist. He conducted research in electromyography, cardiac output, cardiac pacing, ventricular defibrillation, and blood pressure. He discovered and demonstrated precisely the optimal sites on the chest for defibrillation or pacing.

== Biography ==
Geddes was born May 24, 1921, in Scotland, and moved with his family to Quebec, Canada at a young age. He held the B.S. and M.S. degrees in electrical engineering from McGill University, Montreal, Quebec, and the Ph.D. degree in Physiology from Baylor College of Medicine, Houston, Texas. At that medical school, he was Assistant, Associate, and Full Professor of Physiology, and Director of the Division of Biomedical Engineering. Director of Engineering at Purdue University.

Geddes was a member of the American Physiological Society, and was a Fellow of the IEEE; the American Association for the Advancement of Science; the American College of Cardiology; Australasian College of Physical Scientists and Engineers in Medicine; and the Royal Society of Medicine.

He received the award for leadership in biomedical engineering from the Alliance for Engineering in Medicine and Biology (1985); was elected to the National Academy of Engineering (1985); the IEEE Engineering in Medicine and Biology Society Career Achievement Award (1986); the Association for the Advancement of Medical Instrumentation Laufman-Greatbatch Award(1987); the Outstanding Educator Award of the American Society for Engineering Education (1989); the IEEE Edison Medal in 1994 for fundamental contributions to applied biomedical instrumentation and the understanding of the electrical properties of the cardiovascular system, and the 2006 National Medal of Technology by President George W. Bush for his contributions to electrode design and tissue restoration. He was awarded a D.Sc. honoris causa by McGill University in 1971.

He died on October 25, 2009.
