= Brown University School of Engineering =

Engineering school of Brown University

- Established: 1847; 179 years ago 2011 as a school
- Dean: Tejal Desai
- Academic staff: 61 full-time tenure-track faculty
- Students: 655 undergraduate, 501 graduate
- Location: Providence, RI
- Website: engineering.brown.edu

The Brown University School of Engineering is the engineering school of Brown University, located in Providence, Rhode Island. The school was established in 2010 based on the original Division of Engineering.

The school awards undergraduate, graduate, and doctoral degrees. The school additionally offers a 5th-year master program as well as a joint graduate program with the Rhode Island School of Design.

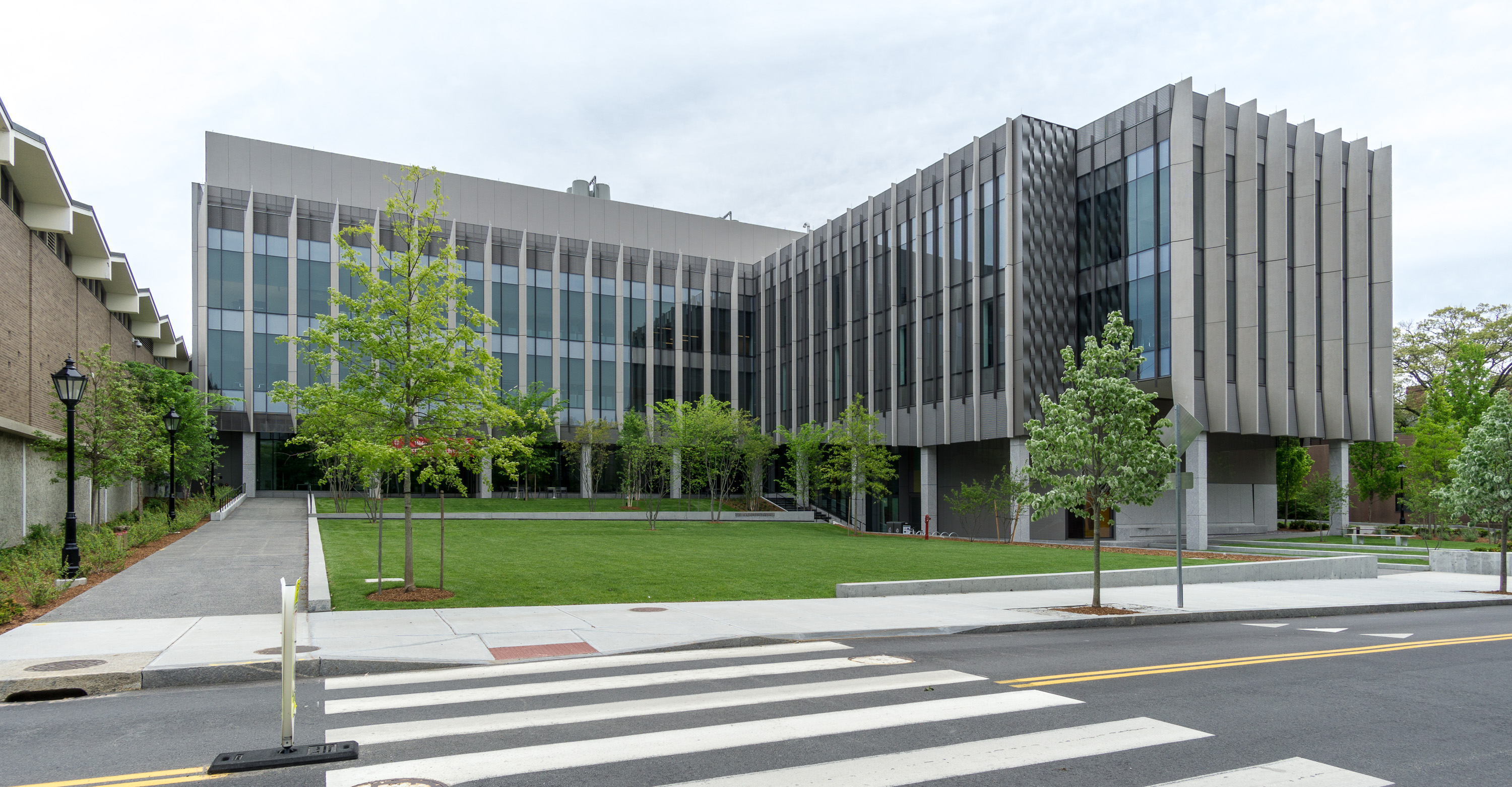
Brown's Engineering Research Center is the school's newest building.

== History ==
Brown offered its first engineering course in 1847, making the school's program the oldest undergraduate engineering program in the Ivy League and the third-oldest civilian engineering program in the United States. (Note: The program was preceded by that of the Rensselaer Institute (1824) and Union College (1845)) In 1850, the civil engineering curriculum was inaugurated as a focused one and a half year program. In 1903, engineering moved into its own new building on Lincoln Field.

The current program was formed in 1916 from the combination of civil, mechanical, and electrical engineering departments.

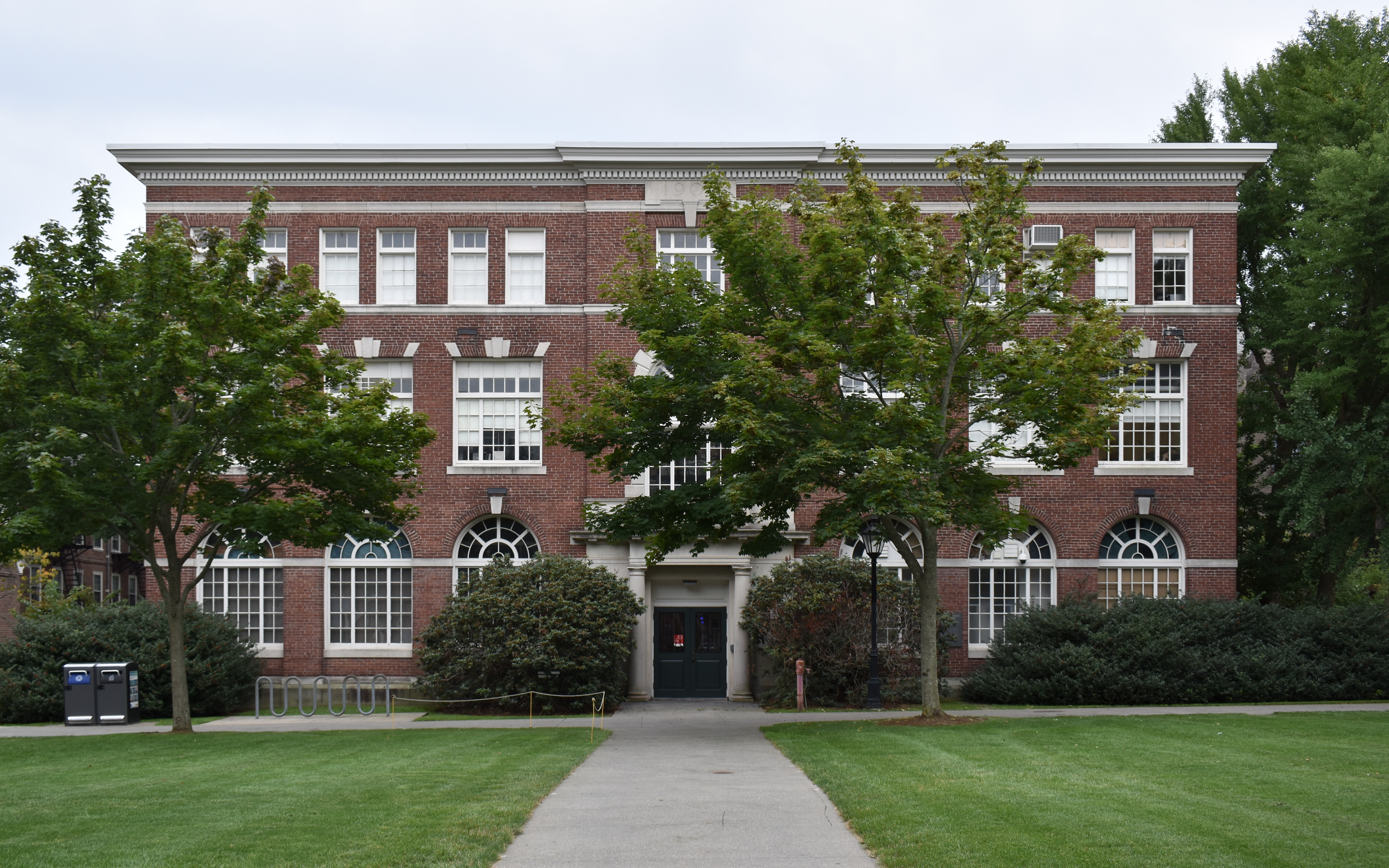
The Lincoln Field Building was built in 1903 as the university's first building devoted to engineering

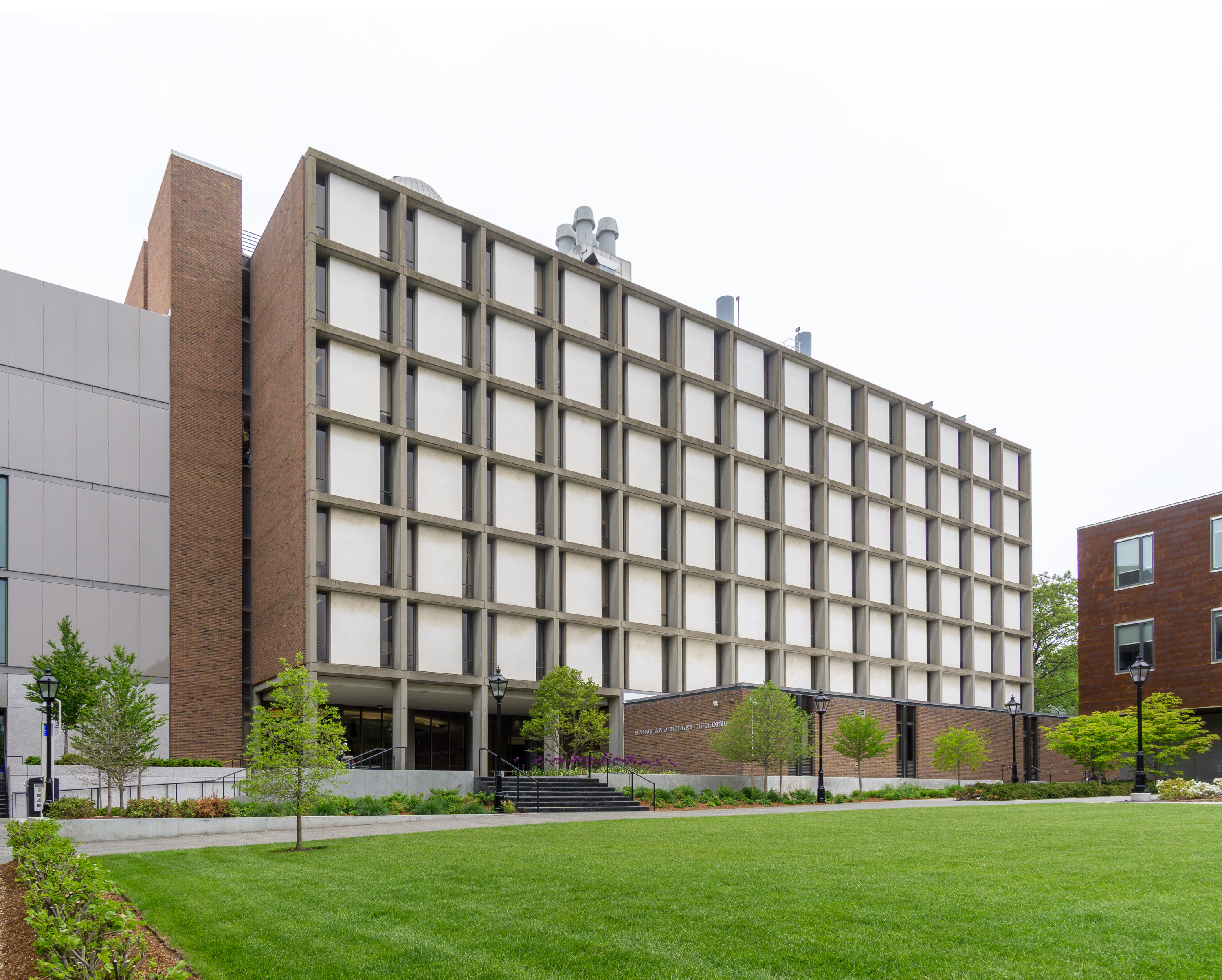
Built in 1965, Barus & Holley is shared by the Brown Physics Department and School of Engineering

In 2010, the university established the Brown University School of Engineering based on the original Division of Engineering. In July 2011, Lawrence Larson became the school's inaugural Dean. Prior to his appointment, Larson served as the chair of the Electrical and Computer Engineering Department at the Jacobs School of Engineering at the University of California, San Diego.

Between 2014 and 2017, the school undertook a major expansion of its facilities, designing and constructing a new Engineering Research Center.

== Undergraduate education ==
The Brown University School of Engineering offers ABET-accredited engineering concentrations in biomedical, chemical, computer, electrical, environmental engineering, materials, and mechanical engineering (Sc.B.). Also offered are programs in design engineering and engineering-physics. In addition, the Brown School of Engineering offers a bachelor of arts degree in engineering.

== Master's and Ph.D. programs ==
The Brown University School of Engineering offers master's degree programs in biomedical engineering, chemical engineering, data-enabled computational engineering and science, electrical and computer engineering, environmental engineering, innovation management and entrepreneurship, materials science and engineering, mechanical engineering and applied mechanics, sustainable energy, and technology leadership.

In 2020, the school partnered with the Rhode Island School of Design's Division of Architecture and Design to launch a new joint Master of Arts in Design Engineering (MADE) program. The program is designed as an 11-month residential program and began in the summer of 2021.

The Brown University School of Engineering offers Ph.D. programs in biomedical engineering, chemical and environmental engineering, electrical and computer engineering, fluids and thermal sciences, materials science and engineering, and mechanics of solids and structures.

== Rankings ==
In its 2023 rankings, U.S. News & World Report ranked Brown as the 33rd best undergraduate engineering school in the country. The School of Engineering graduate program ranked 53rd.

In 2019, Brown awarded the 7th highest percentage of undergraduate engineering bachelor’s degrees to women, at 47%.

== Notable alumni ==
Graduates of the School of Engineering have become prominent scientists, astronauts, athletes, government officials, pioneers, entrepreneurs, CEOs, financiers, and scholars.

Among the school's notable graduates in business are Dara Khosrowshahi '91, CEO of Uber and former CEO of Expedia; Aneel Bhusri '88, co-founder and co-CEO of Workday; Melanie Whelan '99, former CEO of SoulCycle; John S. Chen '78, president and CEO of Sybase and interim CEO of Blackberry; George M.C. Fisher Sc.M. '64 Ph.D. '66, CEO of Motorola; Theresia Gouw '90, Forbes Midas List investor; and Mary Lou Jepsen '87 Ph.D. '97.

Notable alumni in academia and research include Sangeeta N. Bhatia '90, John J. and Dorothy Wilson Professor at MIT and HHMI Investigator; Ayanna Howard '93, dean of the Ohio State University College of Engineering; Ka Yee Christina Lee (1985), Provost at the University of Chicago; and Yang Wei Ph.D. '85, president emeritus of Zhejiang University. Other graduates in academia include Tejal A. Desai '94, Dean of Engineering at Brown University; Kaliat Ramesh '85 Ph.D. '88, Alonzo G. Decker Jr. Professor of Science and Engineering at Johns Hopkins University; Lallit Anand Ph.D. 1975, Warren and Towneley Rohsenow Professor of Mechanical Engineering at MIT; and Reda R. Mankbadi Ph.D. '79, Founding Dean of the Embry-Riddle College of Engineering.

The school's alumni in aeronautics and space research and travel include Thomas O. Paine '42, third administrator of NASA (1969–1970); Byron K. Lichtenberg '69 fighter pilot and payload specialist; and Brian Binnie '75 Sc.M. '76, former United States Navy officer and test pilot for SpaceShipOne.

Notable athletes to have graduated from the school include racecar driver Mark Donohue '59; football players Steve Jordan '82 and James Develin '10; and olympic rowers Dick Dreissigacker '69, Jamie Koven '95, Igor Boraska '95, and Nikola Stojić '97.

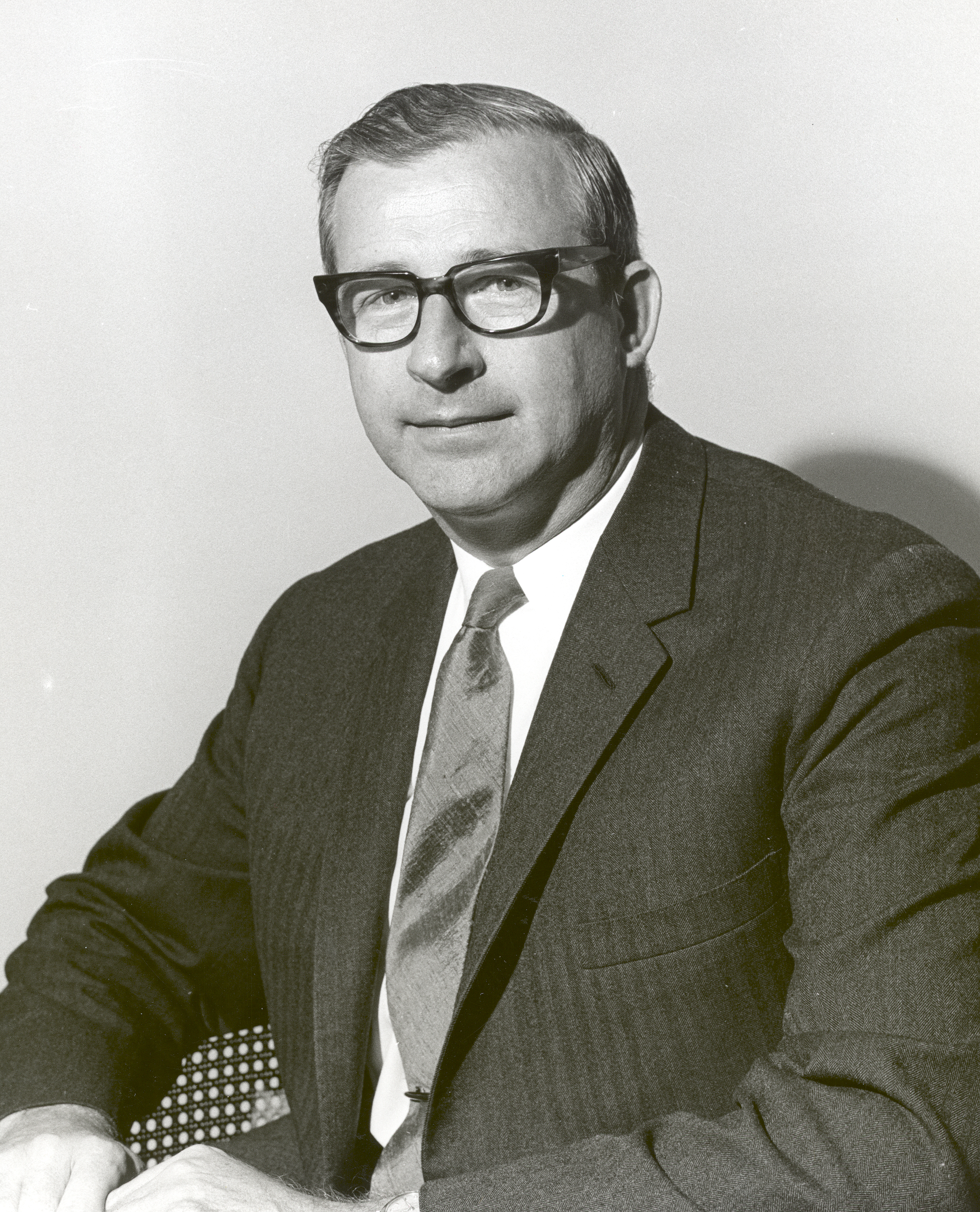
Thomas O. Paine '42 administrator of NASA during Apollo 11

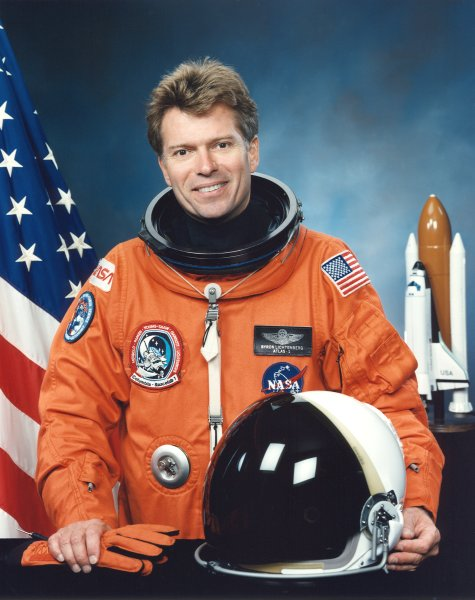
Byron K. Lichtenberg '69, engineer and astronaut

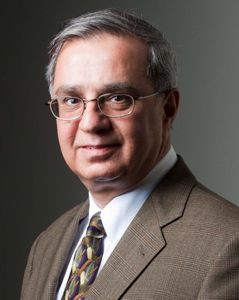
Lallit Anand Ph.D. '75, of MIT

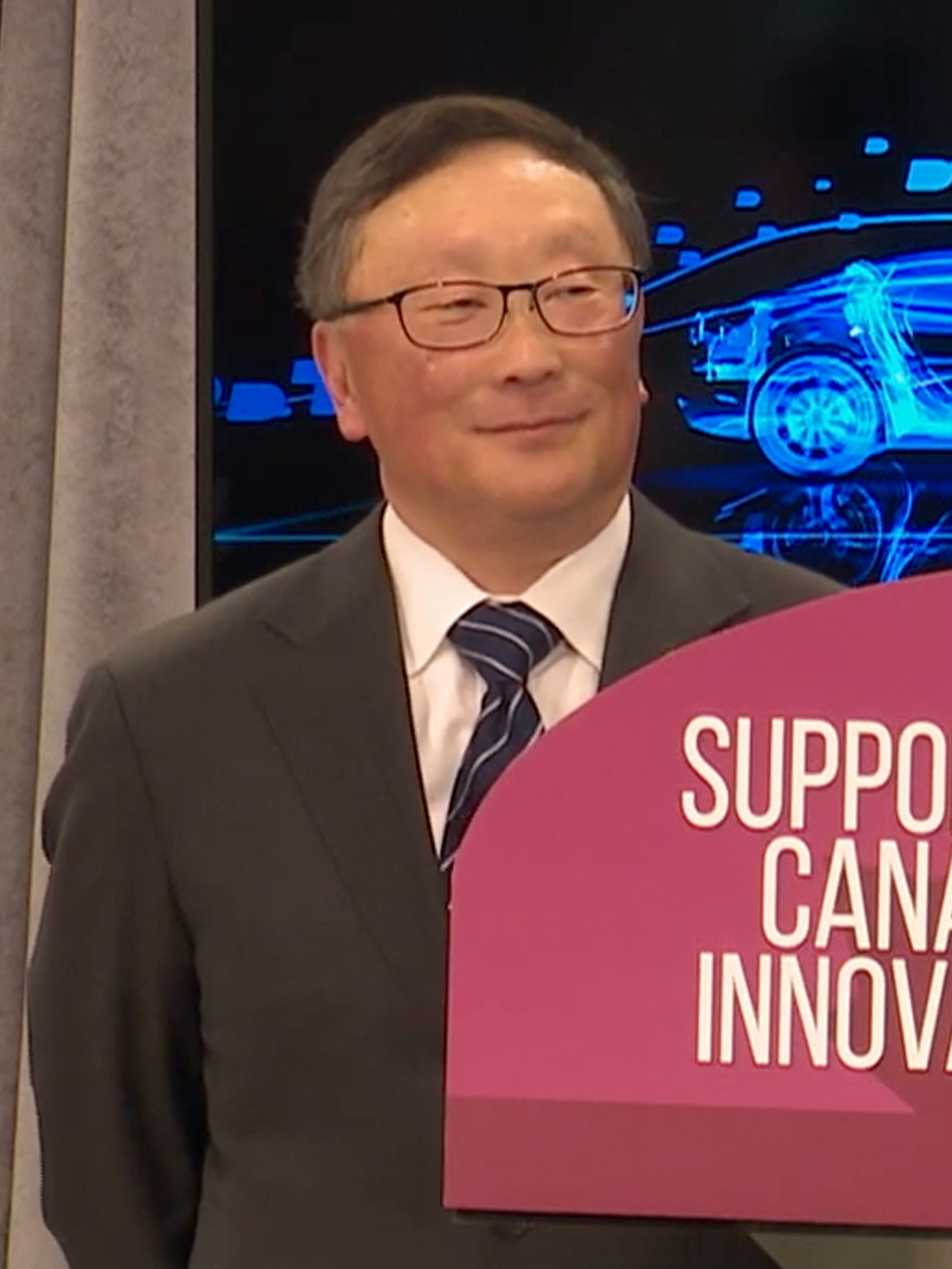
John S. Chen '78, CEO of Blackberry

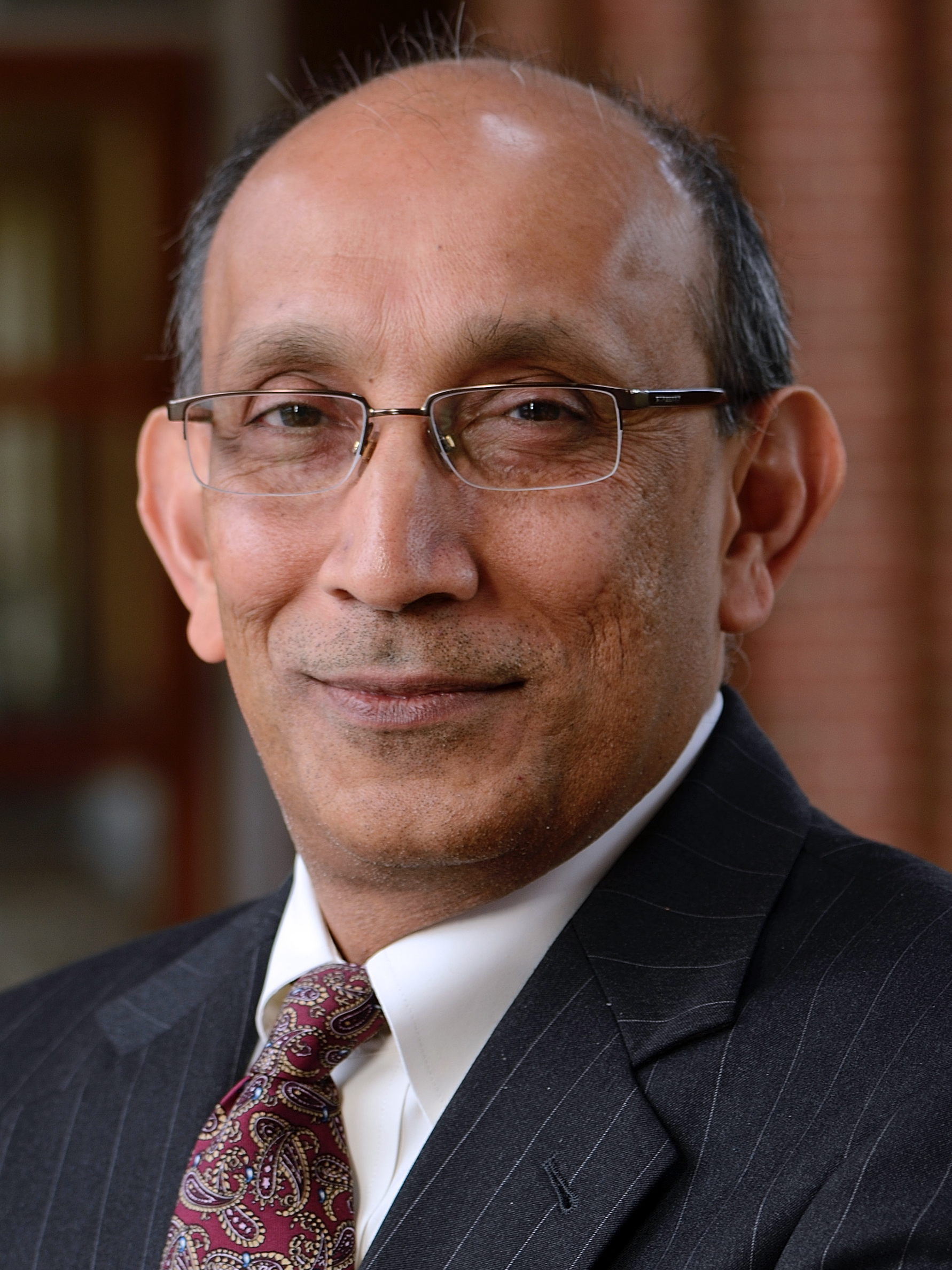
Kaliat Ramesh '85 Ph.D. '88, of Johns Hopkins University

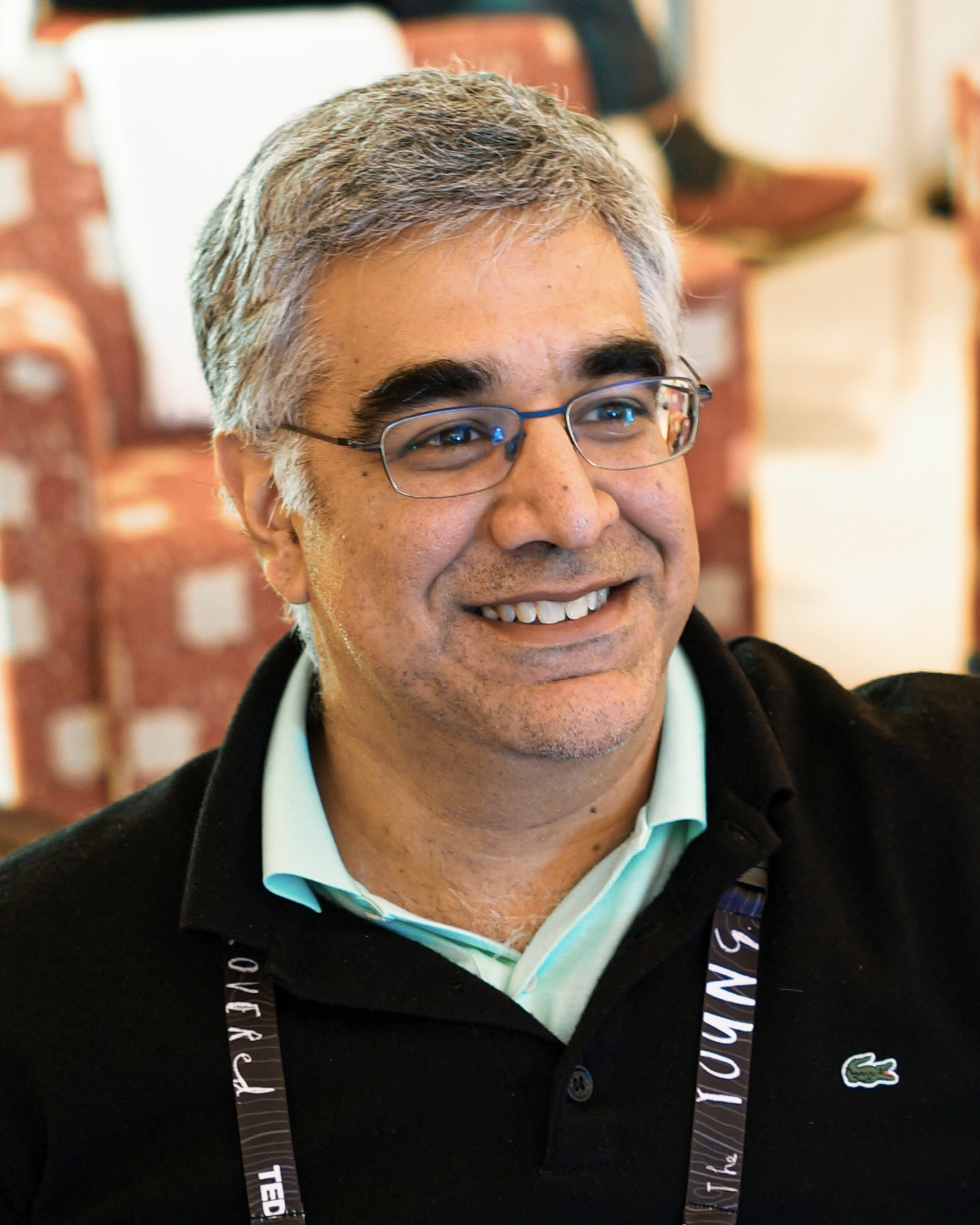
Aneel Bhusri '88, co-founder and CEO of Workday

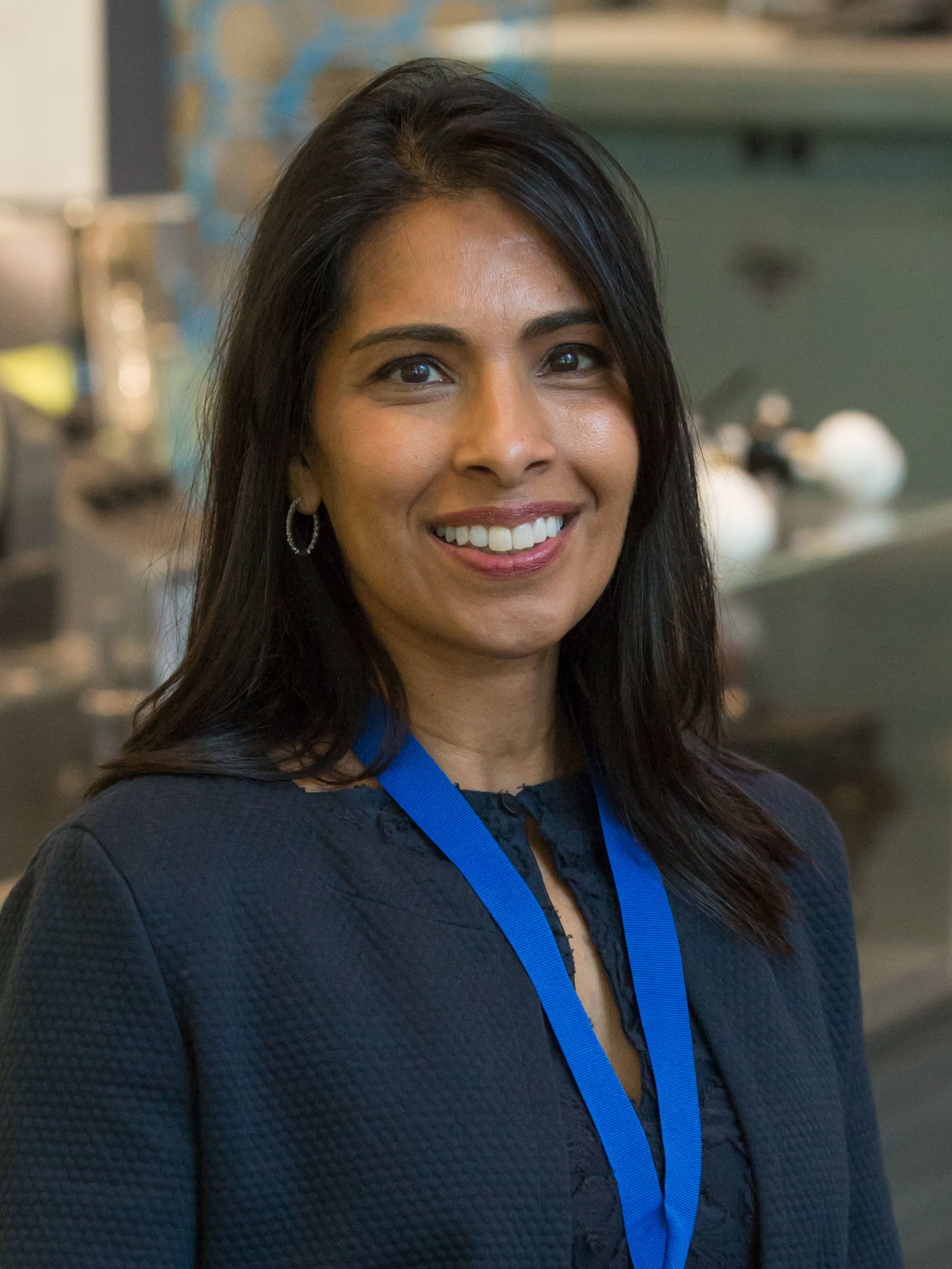
Sangeeta N. Bhatia '90, bioengineer at MIT, HHMI Investigator

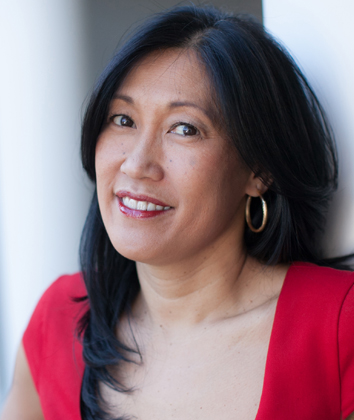
Theresia Gouw '90, Forbes Midas List investor

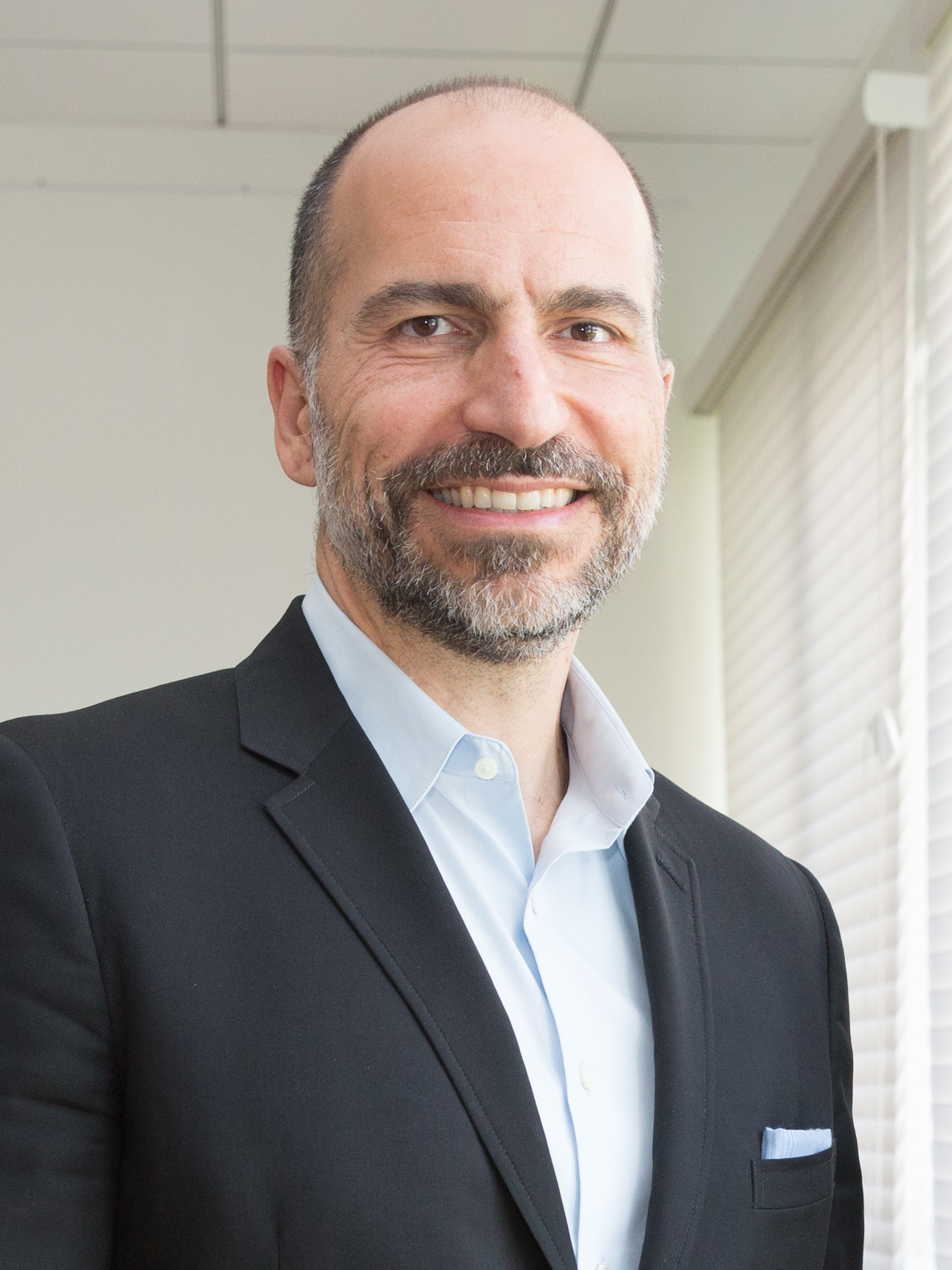
Dara Khosrowshahi '91, CEO of Uber

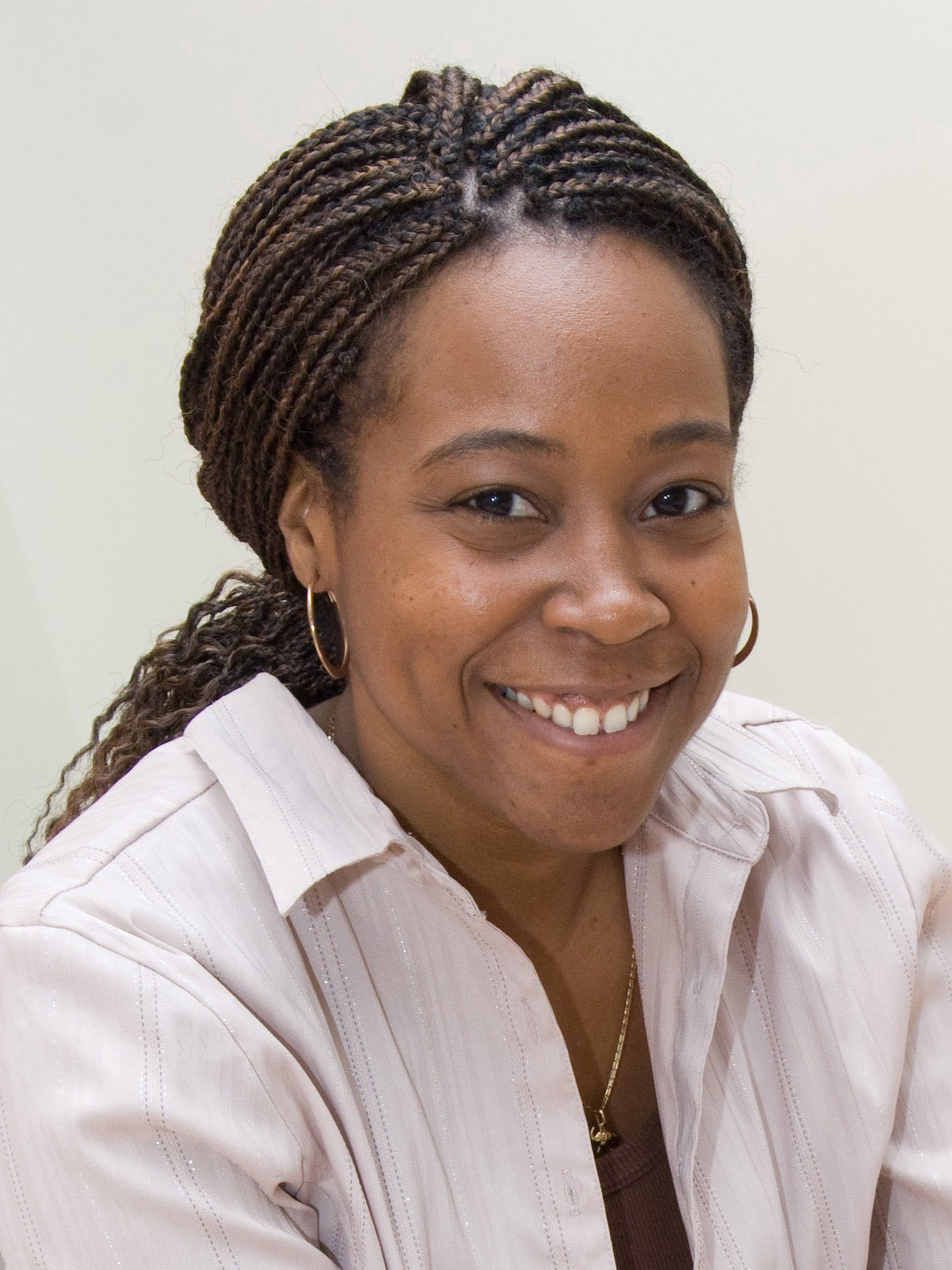
Ayanna Howard '93, Dean of Ohio State's College of Engineering

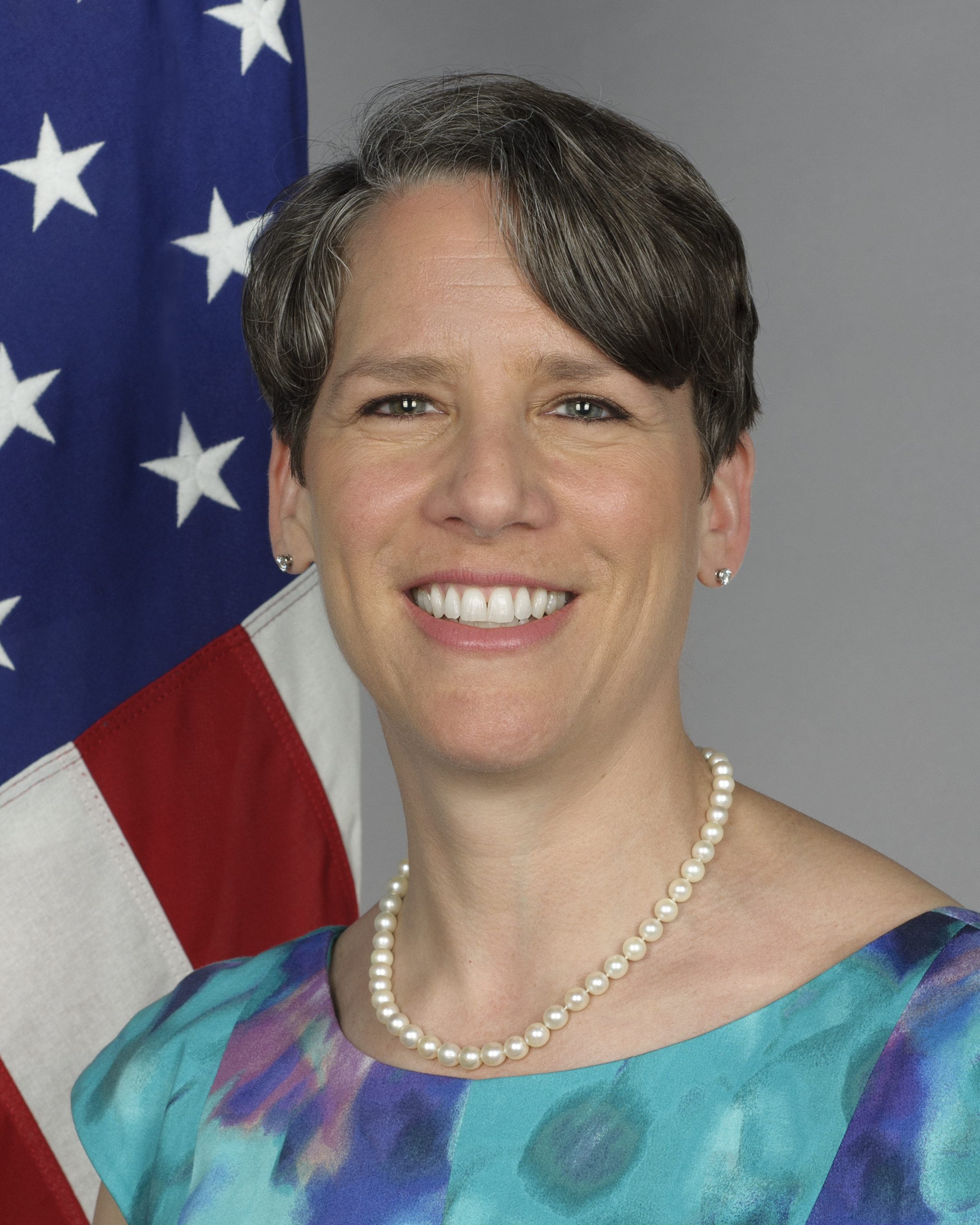
Suzan G. LeVine '93, American diplomat

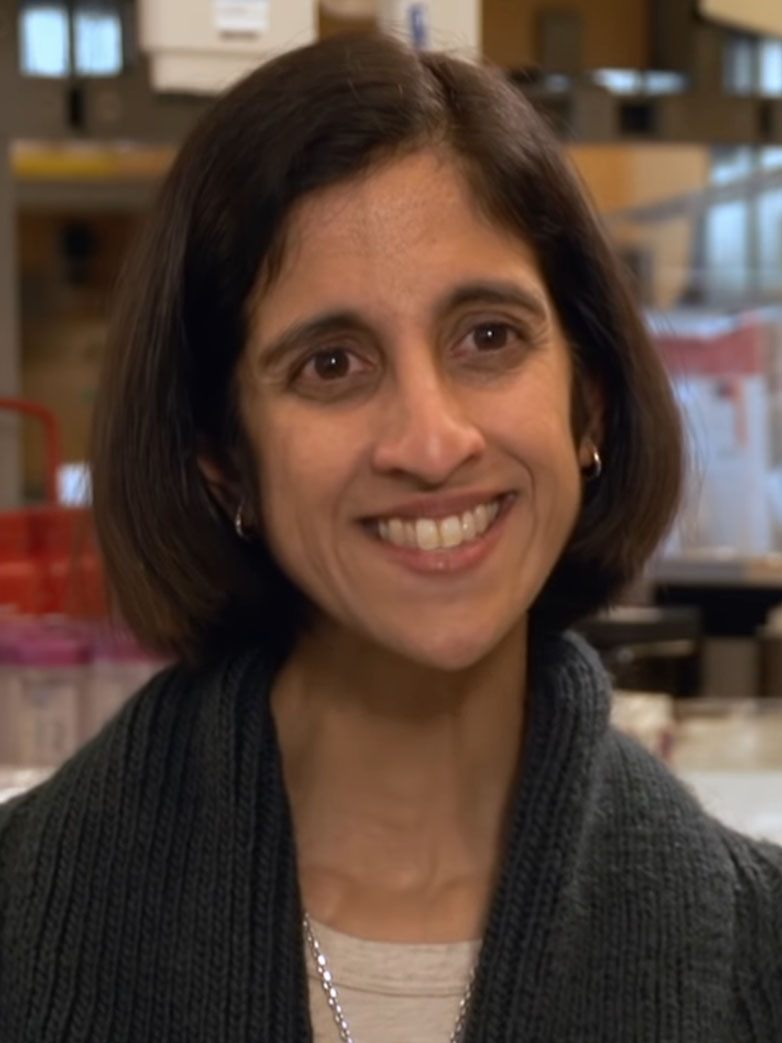
Tejal A. Desai '94, Dean of Engineering at Brown University
