= Cape Clear =

Cape Clear may refer to:

- Cape Clear (software company)
- Cape Clear Island, on the southern coast of Ireland
- Cape Clear, Victoria, a town in Australia
