= Cornell Duffield College of Engineering =

Engineering school in Ithaca, New York, US

Coordinates: 42.444672°N 76.484316°W

Cornell David A. Duffield College of Engineering
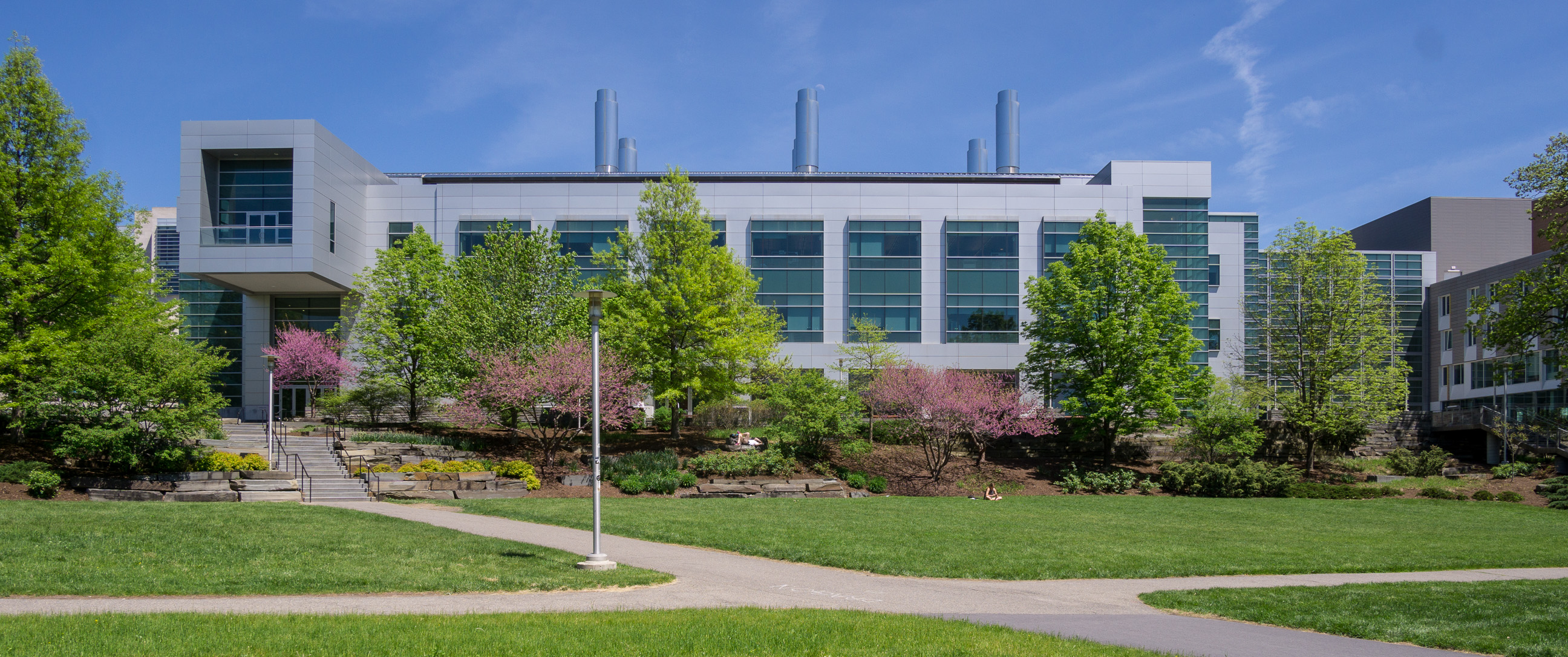
- Former name: College of Engineering (1919–2026)
- Type: Private engineering school
- Established: 1919
- Dean: Lynden A. Archer
- Location: Ithaca, New York, USA
- Website: duffield.cornell.edu

The Cornell David A. Duffield College of Engineering is the engineering school of Cornell University in Ithaca, New York, United States. It was formed in 1919 by the amalgamation of the Sibley College of Mechanical Engineering and Mechanic Arts and the College of Civil Engineering. In 2026 the College was renamed after alumnus David A. Duffield, in recognition of his cumulative $520 million in gifts.

== History ==
Instruction in mechanical and civil engineering began when Cornell University opened its doors in 1868. In 1870, Hiram Sibley's gift funded the establishment of the Sibley College of Mechanical Engineering and Mechanic Arts, one of two predecessor engineering units alongside the College of Civil Engineering; the two merged in 1919 to form the College of Engineering. Early programs were housed in Sibley, Lincoln, Franklin, Rand, and Morse Halls.

According to the college's history, Cornell established one of the earliest academic programs in electrical engineering in the United States in 1883 and produced the nation's first electrical engineering graduates in 1885, the same year the Department of Electrical Engineering was established.

Kate Gleason, Cornell's first female mechanical engineering student, matriculated in 1884, and later became the first woman elected to the American Society of Mechanical Engineers.

On January 22, 2026, Cornell University announced that the College of Engineering would be renamed the Cornell David A. Duffield College of Engineering in recognition of alumnus David A. Duffield's (B.S. 1962; MBA 1964) cumulative $520 million in gifts to the college. The renaming followed a $371.5 million pledge that was, at the time, the largest single gift in Cornell University's history; Duffield's total giving across all of Cornell, including gifts to the College of Veterinary Medicine, exceeds $550 million.

== Departments ==
Aerial photo of the Cornell Duffield Engineering quad, featuring Duffield Hall.

Cornell Duffield Engineering comprises 14 academic departments and department-level schools:

- School of Applied and Engineering Physics
- Department of Biological and Environmental Engineering
- Meinig School of Biomedical Engineering
- Robert Frederick Smith School of Chemical and Biomolecular Engineering
- School of Civil and Environmental Engineering
- Department of Computer Science
- Department of Design Tech
- Department of Earth and Atmospheric Sciences
- School of Electrical and Computer Engineering
- Engineering Management Program
- Department of Materials Science and Engineering
- Sibley School of Mechanical and Aerospace Engineering
- School of Operations Research and Information Engineering
- Systems Engineering Program

The Sibley School of Mechanical and Aerospace Engineering (originally known as the Sibley College of the Mechanic Arts, and located in East Sibley Hall) awarded its first four-year Bachelor of Mechanical Engineering degree in 1874.

The College of Engineering is ranked 10th nationally in the 2026 U.S. News & World Report.

== Joseph N. Pew, Jr. Engineering Quad ==
The Joseph N. Pew, Jr. Engineering Quad was designed in the 1940s and 1950s on a site previously occupied by the Old Armory and faculty housing, using a master plan developed by the Perkins and Will firm. The quad is named for Joseph N. Pew Jr. (Mechanical Engineering, B.S. 1908), later an industrialist and philanthropist. It has undergone major changes in recent years, particularly with the completion of Duffield Hall. In 2004, relandscaping with a design inspired by Cascadilla Gorge was completed and the quad's landmark sundial, designed by Cornell President Emeritus Dale Corson, was restored to its place on the quad.

Duffield Hall, which houses research and teaching facilities for nanoscale science and engineering, is connected by an atrium to Upson Hall; as of 2026, Duffield Hall is undergoing a further expansion that will absorb the adjacent Phillips Hall, with the Phillips family's consent to retire the separate "Phillips Hall" name in favor of a "Phillips Auditorium" within the expanded building. Connected to Upson Hall, away from the quad, are Grumman Hall (1957) and Frank H. T. Rhodes Hall (1990), which houses the Cornell University Center for Advanced Computing (formerly the Cornell Theory Center).

On the southern end of the quad, next to Upson Hall and near Cascadilla Creek, are Kimball Hall, Tang Hall (formerly Thurston Hall, expanded and renamed in 2023–2024 in recognition of a gift from Martin Y. and Margaret Lee Tang), and Bard Hall, all part of a single brick and concrete structure. Bard Hall is home to the Department of Materials Science and Engineering. Next to Bard, and across from the Cornell Law School, stand Snee Hall and Hollister Hall, home to the School of Civil and Environmental Engineering. Between Upson and Kimball stands Ward Hall (1963); its nuclear reactor was decommissioned in 2001, but the building itself remains in active use. Today it houses offices for the college's marketing and communications staff, facilities staff, and the '''New York Consortium for Space Technology (NYCST)''', a Cornell-led space-technology research consortium funded by the U.S. Department of Defense, whose test facilities include a high-bay spacecraft simulation lab in the building. Carpenter Hall (1956), containing the Engineering Library, stands next to Hollister. Across Campus Road is Franklin W. Olin Jr. Hall (1942), home of the R.F. Smith School of Chemical and Biomolecular Engineering.

== Research ==
Duffield Engineering operates several major shared research facilities, including the '''Cornell NanoScale Science and Technology Facility (CNF)''', a National Science Foundation–supported nanofabrication user facility established in 1977 and housed in Duffield Hall, which serves several hundred academic and industry users annually.

Notable research originating from the college includes:

- The Fab@Home project (2006), one of the first two fully open-source DIY 3D printers (alongside RepRap).
- The "Cornell Ranger", a four-legged robot developed in the Biorobotics and Locomotion Laboratory under professor Andy Ruina, which set an unofficial world distance record for an untethered walking robot, traveling 14.3 miles (23 km) on a single battery charge in July 2010, following an earlier record of 5.6 miles set in 2008.
- Team Cornell's "Skynet", a converted Chevrolet Tahoe, was one of six vehicles (out of 35 entrants) to complete all three missions of the 2007 DARPA Grand Challenge and DARPA Urban Challenge, a Defense Advanced Research Projects Agency (DARPA) competition for autonomous vehicles navigating simulated city traffic.
- Early bio-printing of living tissue: in 2006, Hod Lipson (then a professor of Mechanical and Aerospace Engineering) and Lawrence Bonassar (Biomedical Engineering) reported one of the first uses of freeform fabrication to print seeded alginate hydrogels, including meniscus-shaped constructs, in a peer-reviewed study.

== Notable people ==
=== Alumni ===
- David A. Duffield (B.E.E. 1962, MBA 1964) – co-founder of PeopleSoft and Workday; namesake of the college.
- Bill Nye (B.S. Mechanical Engineering, 1977) – science communicator, television personality.
- Robert F. Smith (B.S. Chemical Engineering, 1985) – founder and CEO of Vista Equity Partners; namesake of the R.F. Smith School of Chemical and Biomolecular Engineering.
- Irwin M. Jacobs (B.E.E. 1954, M.S. 1956) – co-founder of Qualcomm; pioneer of CDMA wireless technology.
- Elmer Sperry (attended 1878–1879) – inventor of the gyrocompass; founder of the Sperry Corporation.
- Willis Carrier (M.E. 1901) – inventor of modern air conditioning; founder of the Carrier Corporation.
- Nora Stanton Blatch Barney (Civil Engineering, 1905) – first woman to earn an engineering degree at Cornell.
- Kate Gleason (attended Sibley College, 1880s) – industrialist; first woman elected to the American Society of Mechanical Engineers.
- John A. Swanson (B.M.E. 1961, M.Eng. 1963) – founder of ANSYS, Inc.
- Franklin W. Olin (Class of 1886) – industrialist; namesake of Olin Hall and Olin College of Engineering.
- Robert S. Langer (B.S. Chemical Engineering, 1970) – MIT Institute Professor; pioneer in biotechnology, drug delivery, and tissue engineering; co-founder of Moderna; member of the National Academy of Sciences, National Academy of Engineering, National Academy of Medicine, and National Academy of Inventors; recipient of the National Medal of Science and National Medal of Technology and Innovation.

=== Faculty ===
- Robert Henry Thurston – founding director of the Sibley College, 1885–1903; founder of the American Society of Mechanical Engineers.
- Dale R. Corson – physicist, later Cornell University president; designed the Pew Engineering Quad sundial.
- Juris Hartmanis – founding chair of Cornell's Department of Computer Science, which was jointly housed in the College of Engineering and the College of Arts and Sciences at its 1965 founding; 1993 Turing Award laureate.
- Robert C. Richardson – professor of Applied and Engineering Physics; 1996 Nobel Prize in Physics.
- Solomon C. Hollister – Dean of the College of Engineering, 1937–1959; namesake of Hollister Hall.
- Michal Lipson – professor, School of Electrical and Computer Engineering, 2001–2015; MacArthur Fellow (2010).
- Lynden A. Archer – Joseph Silbert Dean of Engineering, 2020–present.
