= Tejal A. Desai =

American Nanotechnologist (born 1972)

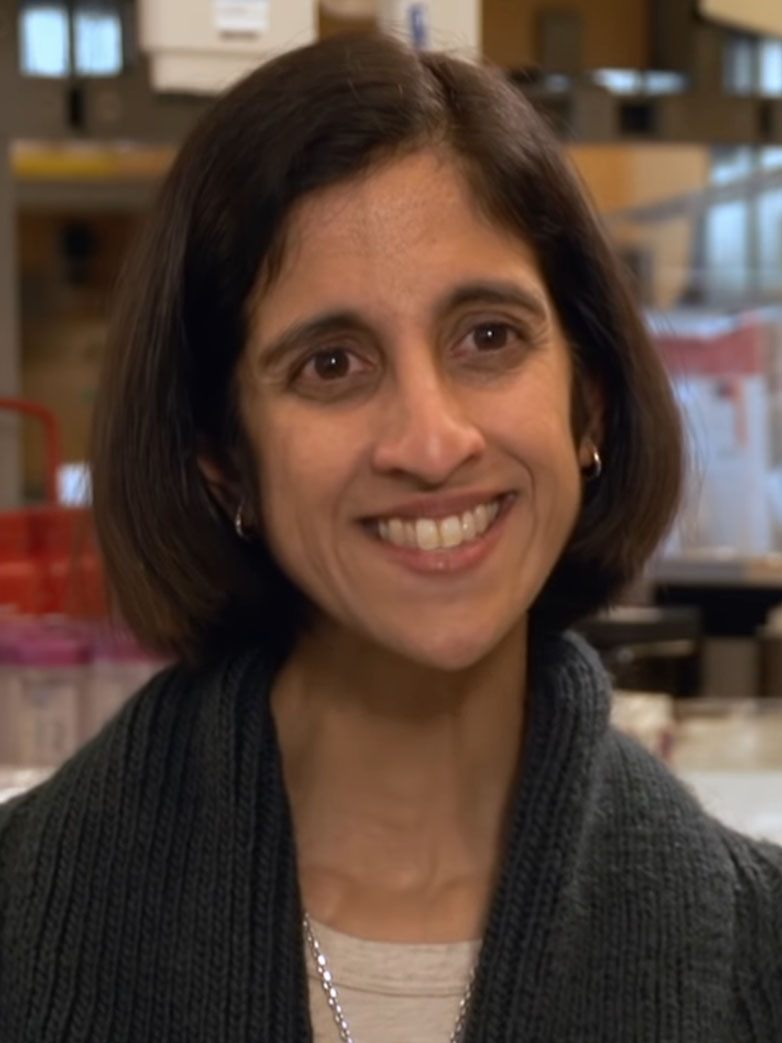
- Born: June 3, 1972 (age 54); Huntington Beach, California
- Education: Brown University; UCSF; UC Berkeley
- Scientific career
- Doctoral advisor: Mauro Ferrari

Tejal Ashwin Desai (born June 3, 1972) is Sorensen Family Dean of Engineering at Brown University. Prior to joining Brown, she was the Deborah Cowan Endowed Professor in the Department of Bioengineering and Therapeutic Sciences at University of California, San Francisco, Director of the Health Innovations via Engineering Initiative (HIVE), and head of the Therapeutic Micro and Nanotechnology Laboratory. She was formerly an associate professor at Boston University (2002–06) and an assistant professor at University of Illinois at Chicago (1998–2001). She is a researcher in the area of therapeutic micro and nanotechnology and has authored and edited at least one book on the subject and another on biomaterials.

In January 2022, she was appointed the dean of Brown University’s School of Engineering. She succeeded inaugural dean, Lawrence Larson in September 2022.

== Early life and education ==
Desai was born on June 3, 1972, in Huntington Beach, California, to Indian parents. She spent most of her childhood in Santa Barbara, California. Desai attended Brown University, which allowed her to pursue both liberal arts courses as well as undergraduate courses in biomedical engineering. She received a Sc. B. from Brown in biomedical engineering in 1994. In 1998 she graduated with a Ph.D. from the joint UCSF/UC Berkeley Bioengineering department, advised by Mauro Ferrari.

== Honors and awards ==
She was elected a fellow of the American Institute for Medical and Biological Engineering in 2012, fellow of the Biomedical Engineering Society (BMES), fellow of the Controlled Release Society (CRS), and she is a member of the National Academy of Medicine, National Academy of Engineering, and the National Academy of Inventors.

== Select publications ==
- Ketul C. Popat; Matthew Eltgroth; Thomas J. Latempa; Craig A. Grimes; Tejal A. Desai (13 August 2007). "Decreased Staphylococcus epidermis adhesion and increased osteoblast functionality on antibiotic-loaded titania nanotubes". Biomaterials. 28 (32): 4880–4888. doi:10.1016/j.biomaterials.2007.07.037. ISSN 0142-9612. PMID 17697708. Wikidata Q40094469.
- Ketul C. Popat; Lara Leoni; Craig A. Grimes; Tejal A. Desai (21 March 2007). "Influence of engineered titania nanotubular surfaces on bone cells". Biomaterials. 28 (21): 3188–3197. doi:10.1016/j.biomaterials.2007.03.020. ISSN 0142-9612. PMID 17449092. Wikidata Q46957514.
- James J Norman; Tejal A Desai (January 2006). "Methods for fabrication of nanoscale topography for tissue engineering scaffolds". Annals of Biomedical Engineering. 34 (1): 89–101. doi:10.1007/s10439-005-9005-4. ISSN 0090-6964. PMID 16525765. Wikidata Q28300990.

== Advocacy ==
Desai is a vocal advocate for inclusion and equity in STEM. She was recognized by the Northern California AWIS Judith Poole Award and the UCSF Chancellors Award for the Advancement of Women. As president of American Institute for Medical and Biological Engineering, she led advocacy efforts for increased scientific funding and addressing workforce disparities in science/engineering.
