= Tejal =

- Gender: Female
- Language: Marathi; Sanskrit

Origin
- Origin: Sanskrit
- Region of origin: India

Other names
- Derived: तेज तेजा तेजस

Tejal (Devanagari : तेजल) is an Indian feminine given name.

== Notable people ==
- Tejal Hasabnis (born 1997), Indian cricketer
- Tejal A. Desai (born 1972), American academic in the fields of physiology and nanotechnology
- Tejal Rao, British-American food culture writer for The New York Times
- Tejal Shah (born 1979), Indian visual artist, curator
