= Cape Clear Software =

US software company

Cape Clear Software, Inc.
- Type: Privately held firm
- Industry: software
- Predecessor: Orbware
- Founded: 1999
- Successor: Workday, Inc
- Headquarters: San Mateo, California
- Area served: Atlanta; Chicago; Denver; Waltham; Dublin, Ireland; London, UK
- Services: ESB (Enterprise service bus)

Cape Clear Software, Inc., was a vendor of ESB (Enterprise service bus) software, founded in 1999.

Cape Clear was a spin-off from IONA Technologies. and was a privately held firm with headquarters in San Mateo, California, US, and offices in Atlanta, Chicago, Denver and Waltham, US; Dublin, Ireland; and London, UK.

In November 2000, Cape Clear acquired Orbware a privately held UK-based software company founded in 1999 who were a Java EE licensee and whose OrCAS Enterprise Server product was a compact and high-performance implementation of the Enterprise JavaBean (EJB) and Java EE specifications.

Cape Clear made a final release of the OrCAS J2EE server product in February 2001 before the OrCAS product was merged with Cape Clear's CapeConnect XML integration server product. The combined product was named CapeConnect and was first released in April 2001 (Beta Release) and May 2001 (Full Release)

Cape Clear was identified as one of the leading ESB vendors by Forrester Research in July 2006.

A report published by Forrester Research on 30 June 2006 ranked Cape Clear Software and BEA Systems as the top two performers overall in its evaluation of enterprise service bus (ESB) vendors.

In November 2006, Workday selected Cape Clear's ESB as its platform for service-oriented architecture integration.

On 6 February 2008, Workday announced an agreement to acquire Cape Clear Software. Under the announced arrangement, Cape Clear's ESB would no longer be offered as a standalone product and would instead be available through Workday's Integration On Demand service.
