= Gilda Barabino =

American biomedical and chemical engineer

Gilda A. Barabino
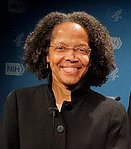
- Born: May 28, 1956 (age 70); Anchorage, Alaska, United States
- Education: Xavier University of Louisiana; Rice University
- Scientific career
- Fields: Biomedical Engineering, Chemical Engineering
- Workplaces: Rohm and Haas; Northeastern University; Georgia Tech; City College of New York; Olin College
- Thesis: Rheological Studies In Sickle Cell Disease (1986)
- Doctoral advisor: Larry V. McIntire

Gilda A. Barabino was the president of the Olin College of Engineering from 2020 to 2025, where she currently teaches as a professor of Biomedical and Chemical engineering. On March 4, 2021, she became the president-elect of the American Association for the Advancement of Science, and between then and 2024, she served as the President and Chair of the Board of Directors. She has served in various positions within the Biomedical and Chemical engineering at different schools, such as The City College of New York, Georgia Institute of Technology, and Northeastern University.

== Early life and education ==
Gilda Ann Barabino was born in Anchorage, Alaska on May 28, 1956. Both her mother, Margaret Agnes Barnes Barnum, and her father, Norman Edward Barnum III, were originally from New Orleans, Louisiana. Barabino's father was in the US Army and stationed in Alaska at the time of her birth. The family moved frequently during her childhood. After her father retired, the family returned to New Orleans. Barabino's mother went back to school and became a nurse's aid, working at Charity Hospital. Her father took a job in the Veteran's Administration, while studying for a bachelor's degree in Business Administration from Southern University at New Orleans.

Barabino began attending Xavier University of Louisiana while still in high school and continued on to complete her studies at Xavier after her high school graduation in 1974. When a high school teacher told her that girls could not become chemists, she decided to pursue an undergraduate degree in chemistry to prove the teacher wrong. Barabino enjoyed her time at the historically black university, since she was no longer the only black student in her classes and was encouraged academically. She graduated with a Bachelor of Science in chemistry with minors in biology and math in 1978.

After finishing her degree, she enrolled in the Louisiana State University (LSU) Dental School and applied for an Army Health Professions scholarship to cover the expenses. Barabino ended up leaving LSU after one year, after her professors refused to communicate with her and another black student, and she was told she would have to repeat her first year. The terms of her scholarship required her to serve in the army as a commissioned officer for three years, even though she did not finish her training. She served in a medical combat unit in Fort Lewis, Washington.

After her mandatory service, Barabino applied to several PhD programs in Chemical Engineering and received a prestigious National Science Foundation graduate fellowship. She decided to pursue chemical engineering, since she was interested in medicine but did not want to be a clinician. She became the first African American admitted to the chemical engineering program at Rice University and only the fifth African American female in the U.S. to obtain a doctorate in chemical engineering. Her thesis work involved studying the abnormal flow of blood in sickle cell disease, a topic she picked because it disproportionately affects African Americans. She worked to understand the molecular mechanisms that cause red blood cells to stick together and adhere to the walls of blood vessels as they deform to pass through small capillaries in people with sickle cell disease. She received a PhD in 1986.

== Career ==
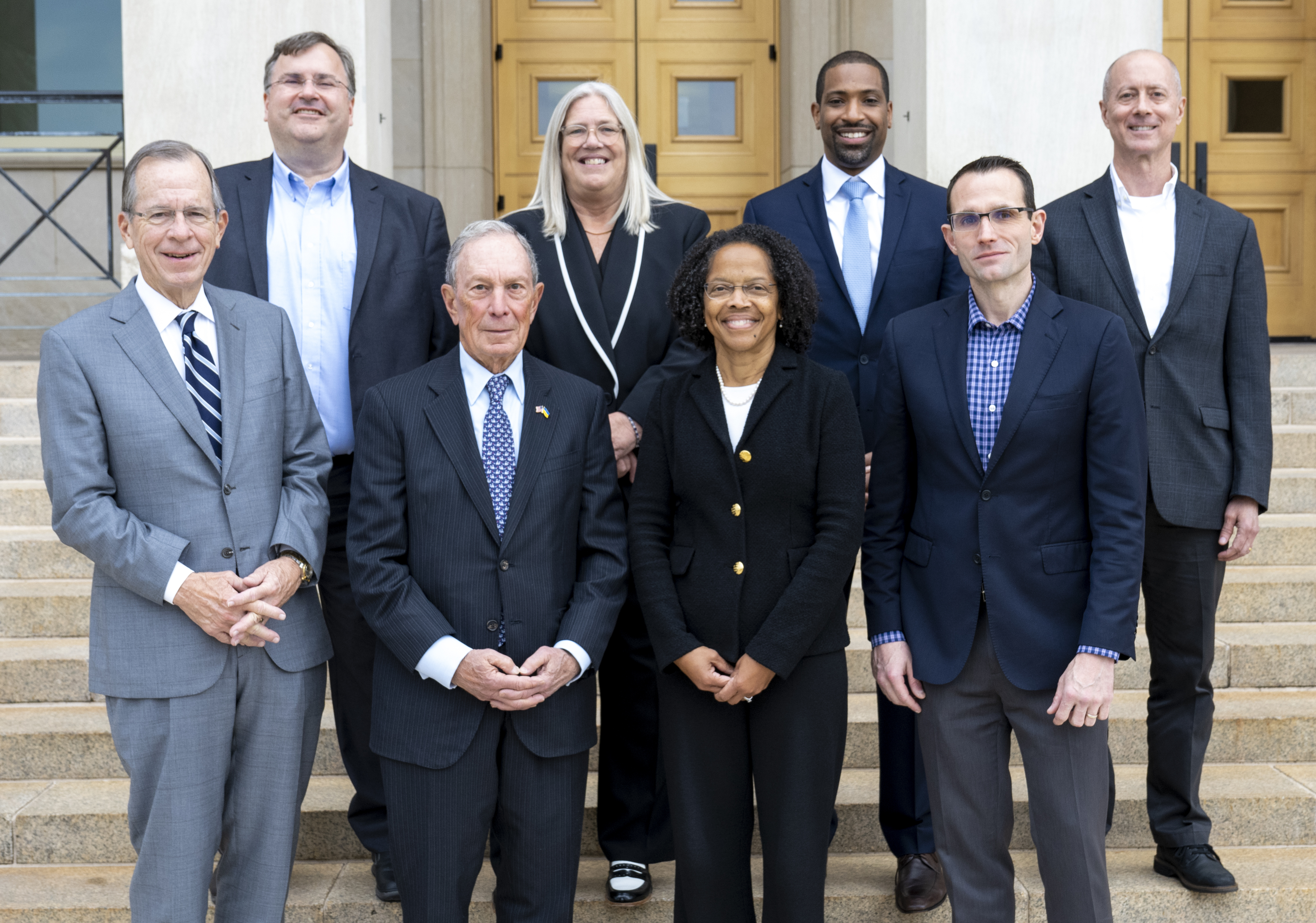
Barabino (front center-right) serves as a member of the US Defense Innovation Board

After finishing her graduate studies, Barabino spent three years working as a chemical engineer at the Rohm and Haas Company, where she oversaw the synthesis of acrylics and acrylates. However, she found that she missed basic research and wanted to work in areas with biomedical applications. In 1989, she became a faculty member at the Northeastern University's department of chemical engineering and a senior research fellow, Center for Biotechnology Engineering at Northeastern. She was the vice provost for undergraduate education from 2000 to 2002 and rose to full professor in 2005.

Together with Lance Collins, Barabino founded the Minority Faculty Forum in 1995. In 2006, they co-organized the Minority Faculty Development Workshop.

In 2007 she moved to Georgia Tech, which was a center for sickle cell research. She was a professor in the department of biomedical engineering at Georgia Tech and Emory University, as well as the associate chair for graduate studies and the inaugural vice provost for academic diversity.

In 2013 she became the Daniel and Frances Berg Professor and dean of the Grove School of Engineering at The City College of New York, where she maintained an active research group. Her areas of research included sickle cell disease, cell and tissue engineering, as well as race, ethnicity and gender in science and engineering.

In 2019, Barabino was elected as a member into the National Academy of Engineering for leadership in bioengineering research and inclusive models of bioengineering education and faculty mentoring.

On July 1, 2020, Barabino became the president of the Olin College of Engineering in Needham, Massachusetts.

From 2021-2024, Dr. Barabino served as the President-elect, President, and Chair of the Board of Directors of AAAS.

== Honors and awards ==
- 2019: National Academy of Engineering Fellow
- 2019: American Institute of Chemical Engineers Award for Service to Society
- 2018: Dr. Joseph N. Cannon Award for Excellence in Chemical Engineering from the National Organization for the Professional Advancement of Black Chemists and Chemical Engineers
- 2017: American Institute for Medical and Biological Engineering Pierre Galletti Award
- 2016–18: American Institute for Medical and Biological Engineering President
- 2016: Honorary degree from Xavier University of Louisiana
- 2015: Presidential Award for Excellence in Science, Mathematics and Engineering Mentoring
- 2012–2014: Biomedical Engineering Society President
- 2012–2014: Sigma Xi Distinguished Lecturer
- 2011: Georgia Tech Woman of Distinction Award
- 2011: American Association for the Advancement of Science Fellow
- 2010: Biomedical Engineering Society Fellow
- 2010: Biomedical Engineering Society Diversity Award
- 2010: American Institute of Chemical Engineers MAC Eminent Engineers Award
- 2010: American Institute of Chemical Engineers MAC Distinguished Service Award
- 2009: Rice University Distinguished Bioengineering Alumna
- 2007: American Institute of Medical and Biological Engineering Fellow
- 1996–1998: National Science Foundation Visiting Professorship for Women
- 1994: American Society for Engineering Education Dow Outstanding Faculty Award
