= David Duffield =

American businessman

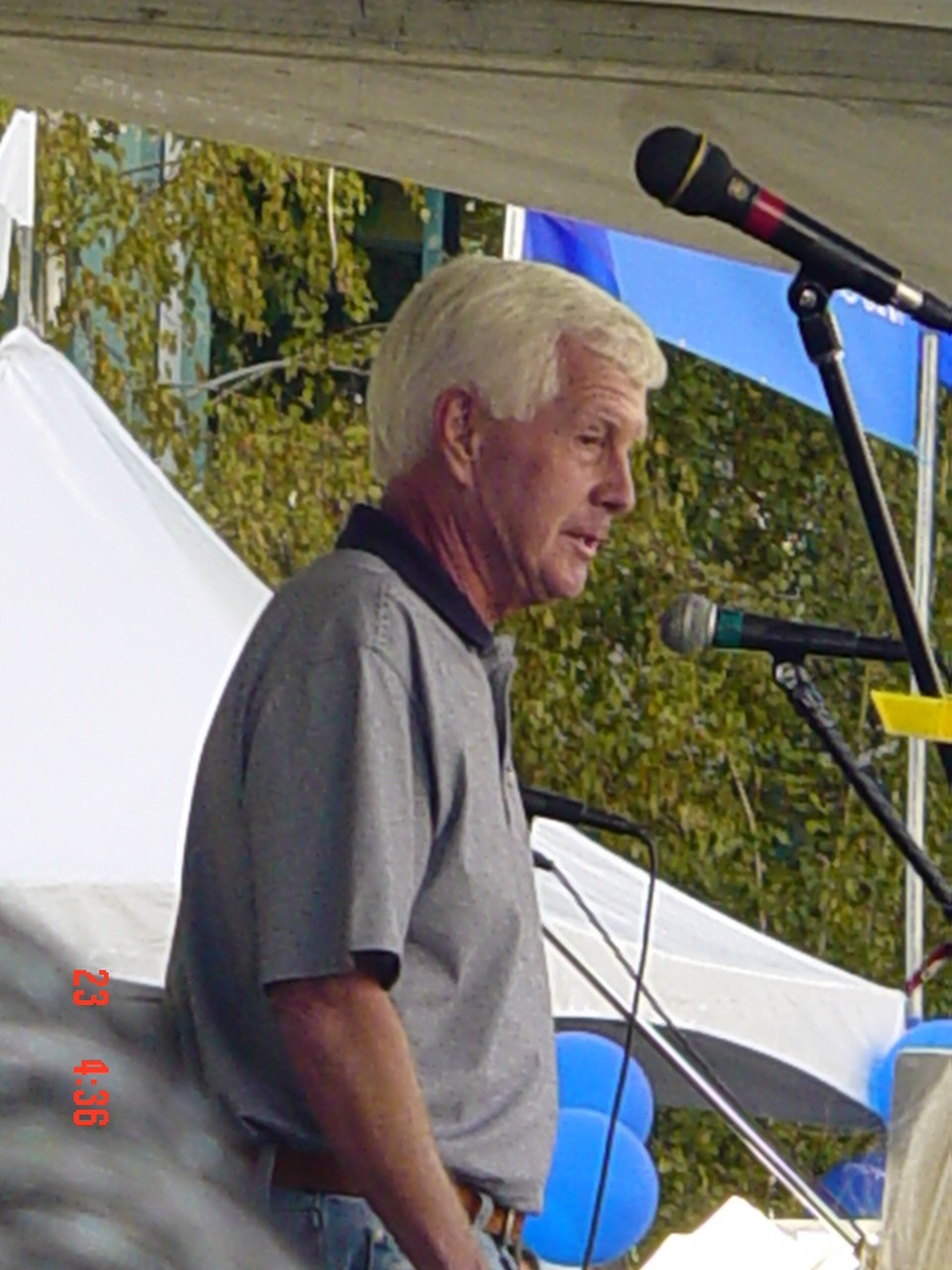
- Duffield in 2005
- Born: David Arthur Duffield; 21 September 1940 (age 86); Cleveland, Ohio, US
- Education: Cornell University (BS, MBA)
- Occupation: Business software entrepreneur
- Spouse: Cheryl Duffield
- Children: 10

David Arthur Duffield (born 21 September 1940) is an American billionaire businessman in the software industry. He is the co-founder and former chairman of PeopleSoft, and co-founder and CEO emeritus of Workday, Inc.. In addition, he is founder and Chairman of Ridgeline, Inc.

Duffield has donated more than $500 million to his alma mater Cornell University, including a series of donations in the 2020s totaling over $400 million. As a result, the university renamed its College of Engineering after him. He has also given $303 million to companion animal welfare causes and organizations, over $100 million to expand other educational institutions close to him and his family, $13 million to local first responders and community organizations, and $2.1 million to veterans affairs. His philanthropic interests are managed by the Dave & Cheryl Duffield Foundation. One of their main projects is the planned Liberty Dogs, a 27-acre service dog training campus in Reno, Nevada, that will match and train disabled military veterans and canine companions. As of 2026, Duffield's net worth is $10.1B.

== Early life ==
Duffield was born in Cleveland, Ohio, and raised in Ho-Ho-Kus, New Jersey. His mother, Mary Duffield, was an elementary school teacher, and his father, Al Duffield, was an engineer without a college degree. In 1954, he graduated from Ho-Ho-Kus elementary school, where his mother taught and his brother, Al Jr., attended. In 1958, David graduated from Ridgewood High School in nearby Ridgewood, New Jersey, where he was co-captain of the baseball team.

He attended Cornell University, where he played in a band and was a pitcher on the baseball team. He received a bachelor's degree in electrical engineering and an MBA from Cornell University. He is the benefactor behind Cornell's Duffield Hall, a nanoscale science (or nanotechnology) and engineering facility at Cornell. While at Cornell, Duffield was a member of Beta Theta Pi.

== Career ==
In 1964, Duffield began his career as a marketing representative and systems engineer at IBM. He left IBM to found Information Associates, which developed university exam scheduling software. In 1972, he left to start Integral Systems, a human resources management systems vendor for higher education clients, including Stanford. In 1979, he started another venture, Business Software Corporation, which provided real-time human resources and payroll applications for commercial enterprises. In 1987, Duffield resigned from Integral Systems.

=== PeopleSoft ===
Duffield founded PeopleSoft in 1987 and was the CEO and chairman. PeopleSoft grew to be the world's second-largest application software company before being acquired by Oracle in January 2005 for $10.7 billion cash.

=== Workday ===
In March 2005, Duffield and former PeopleSoft vice chair and head of product strategy Aneel Bhusri started Workday, Inc., a company that provides financial management, human capital management, and planning software delivered in the form of a software as a service (SaaS) model. The company is headquartered in Pleasanton, California, and employs more than 17,500 people today. Duffield was known as the company's chief customer and employee advocate. He relinquished the co-CEO role in May 2014 and became chairman of the board. He resigned as chairman in April 2021 and was appointed chairman emeritus and ultimately CEO emeritus by Workday's board.

=== Ridgeline ===
Duffield founded his sixth and current company, Ridgeline, in 2017. Headquartered in Incline Village, Nevada, Ridgeline is an industry cloud software platform for investment management. The early-stage company currently employs approximately 650 people in offices in Incline Village, Reno, New York City, and San Ramon, California. Duffield was Chief Executive Officer of Ridgeline until May 2024, when Dave Blair was announced as CEO. Duffield continues as chairman.

== Philanthropy ==
=== Cornell University ===
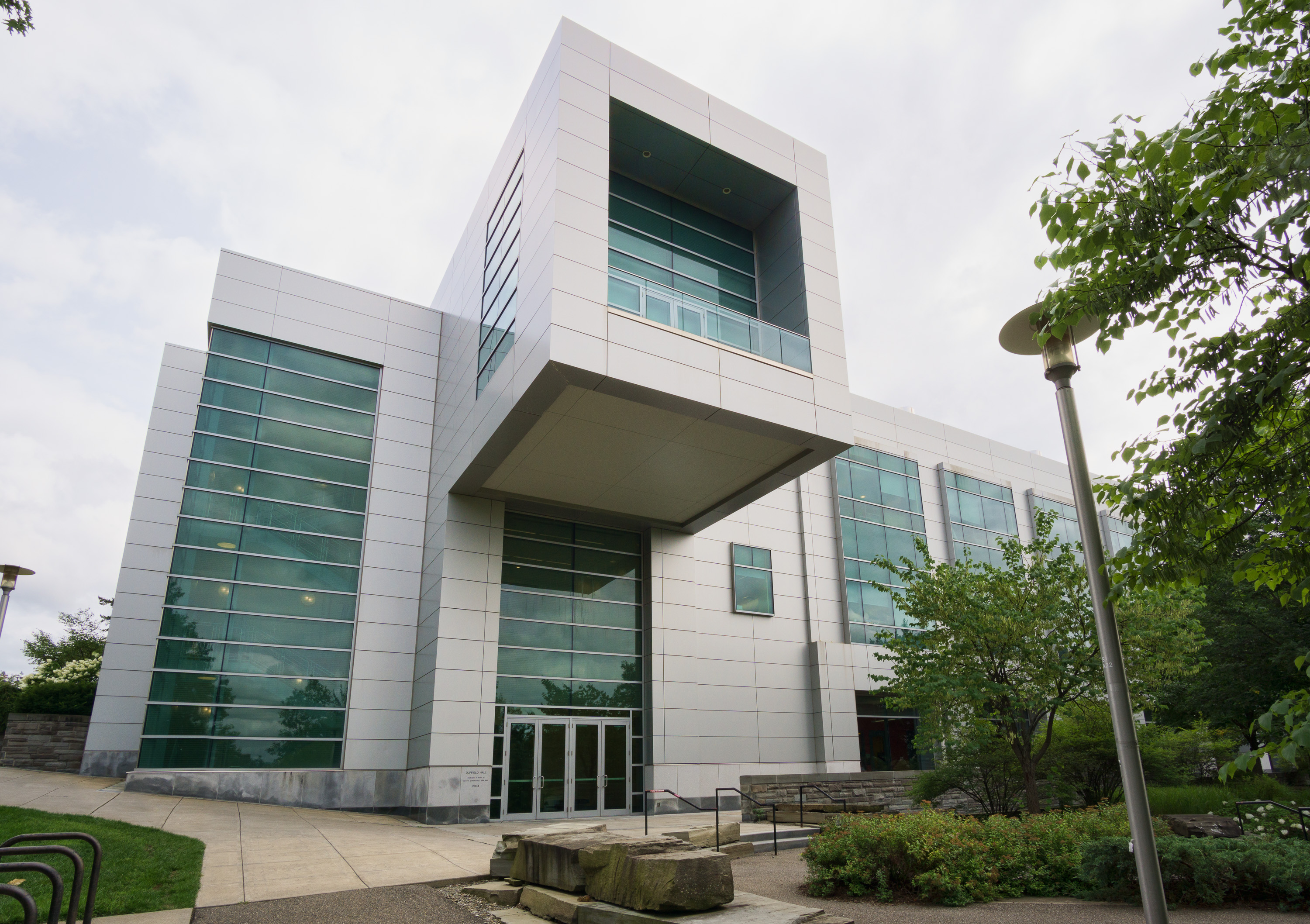
Duffield Hall at Cornell

The Duffields have pledged more than $520 million to Dave's alma mater, Cornell University.

In January 1997, they donated $20 million in support of interdisciplinary engineering and scientific research and education. The new Engineering building was later renamed “Duffield Hall.”

In July 2020, the Duffields donated $5 million to establish the Duffield Family Cornell Promise Scholarship. The gift was the largest single gift to the Cornell Promise Initiative, which provides financial support to students and families facing hardship from the pandemic.

In early 2022, the Duffields also pledged $12.1 million to launch the new Duffield Institute for Animal Behavior at the Cornell University College of Veterinary Medicine. In 2024, Maddie's Shelter Medicine Program (MSMP) at Cornell received a $4.6 million grant from the Duffield Foundation.

In 2025, it was announced that the Duffields were donating $100 million to fund an expansion of Duffield Hall and a renovation of the adjacent Phillips Hall, home to the school of Electrical and Computer Engineering.

In 2026, the Duffields made a donation of $371.5 million - the largest gift in Cornell's history - to the College of Engineering, leading to the renaming of the college as Cornell Duffield Engineering.

=== Dave & Cheryl Duffield Foundation ===
The Duffields established the Dave & Cheryl Duffield Foundation (DCDF) in 2016. Based in Incline Village, Nevada, the foundation has supported animal welfare agencies, pet shelters, local schools, and regional community organizations including local parks and the North Lake Tahoe Boys and Girls Club. In April 2020, the DCDF made a $350,000 grant to Incline Village Community Hospital to address the COVID-19 pandemic. In response to the 2021 Lake Tahoe forest fires, the foundation donated $4 million to over 30 charities, including $2 million to the Red Cross. Additionally, DCDF pledged $10.6 million to schools serving Hohokus, New Jersey, where he grew up.

Duffield founded and donated $25 million to the Lake Tahoe School.

Duffield and his wife donated $27 million to the Washoe County School District to expand Incline High School.

=== Maddie's Fund ===
In 1994, Duffield and his wife Cheryl established Maddie's Fund with an initial investment of $200 million to bring change, collaboration, and innovation to the animal welfare industry. The foundation is named after the Duffields’ Miniature Schnauzer who was a "lighthouse during the stormy period" of the couple's work careers. Maddie died of cancer in 1997, and Duffield acted on his earlier promise to his pet: "If we ever make some money, I promise we will give it back to you and your kind so others can be as happy as we are today."

In 2024, the Fund revised its original focus and now supports multi-site projects with grants ranging from $200,000 to $1.5 million. One of Duffield's daughters, Amy Zeifang, chairs the fund that is valued at $260 million (2024).

== Political activity ==
Together with his spouse, Duffield contributed $1.2 million to Donald Trump's 2020 presidential campaign.

== Awards ==
- 1996 - Cornell Entrepreneur of the Year
- 1998 - Golden Plate Award of the American Academy of Achievement
- 2013 - EY Entrepreneur of the Year Award Recipient
- 2018 - Cornell Engineering Distinguished Alumni Award – its highest alumni honor

== Personal life ==
David Duffield is married to Cheryl Duffield. Between 2005 and 2016 they lived in Alamo, California but now live near Lake Tahoe. The Duffields have a blended family of 10 children: three from David's previous marriage, and seven that the couple adopted together.
