= Lance Collins (engineer) =

American engineer

Lance R. Collins
- Education: Princeton University; University of Pennsylvania
- Awards: Member of the National Academy Engineering (2021) Fellow of the American Association for the Advancement of Science (2014); Fellow of the American Physical Society (2007) Fellow of the American Institute of Chemical Engineers (2005)
- Scientific career
- Fields: Mechanical engineering Chemical engineering
- Workplaces: Virginia Tech; Cornell University; Pennsylvania State University

Lance Collins is an engineer and professor for mechanical and aerospace engineering at Virginia Tech. He was previously the Joseph Silbert Dean of Engineering at the Cornell University College of Engineering and is now the inaugural vice president and executive director of the new Virginia Tech Innovation Campus.

== Education ==
As a rising high-school senior (from Westbury, New York) in 1976, Collins participated in the Minority Introduction to Engineering (MITE) Program at Lafayette College, where he discovered his interest in engineering. Collins was accepted at Cornell University, University of Pennsylvania, Princeton University, and the Massachusetts Institute of Technology.

Collins graduated with a BSE in chemical engineering from Princeton University in 1981 and earned a MS in 1983 and a PhD in 1987 in chemical engineering, both from the University of Pennsylvania. Collins was the second African-American to graduate in chemical engineering from Princeton University (one year after Cato T. Laurencin) and the first African-American to receive a PhD from the University of Pennsylvania's School of Engineering and Applied Sciences. As a graduate student, Collins earned a Cooperative Research Fellowship at Bell Laboratories.

== Career ==
In 1989, Collins was a postdoctoral scholar at Los Alamos National Laboratory, where he worked with Francis H. Harlow.

Collins served as professor of chemical engineering at Pennsylvania State University for 11 years. In 1998, he was a visiting scientist at the Laboratoire de Combustion et Systemes Reactifs in Orléans, France and at Los Alamos National Laboratory. Collins joined Cornell University as a faculty member in 2002. Collins became the first African American director of the Sibley School of Mechanical and Aerospace Engineering and later the first African American dean at Cornell University.

After serving as S. C. Thomas Sze Director of the Sibley School of Mechanical and Aerospace Engineering, Collins became Dean of Engineering at Cornell University in 2010. As dean, Collins nearly doubled the proportion of underrepresented minority students (to 21%), while undergraduate female enrollment grew to 50%. He also took on a central role in establishing of Cornell Tech on Roosevelt Island in Manhattan, New York City in 2011. During Collins' tenure as dean, the college of engineering secured the two largest gifts in its history: a $50 million gift to name the Meinig School of Biomedical Engineering and a $50 million gift to name the Smith School of Chemical and Biomolecular Engineering.

After two terms as Joseph Silbert Dean of Engineering at Cornell, Collins joined Virginia Tech as the inaugural vice president and executive director of the new Innovation Campus in Alexandria, Virginia on August 1, 2020.

Together with Gilda Barabino, Collins founded the Minority Faculty Forum in 1995. In 2006, they co-organized the Minority Faculty Development Workshop.

Collins served as chair of the U.S. National Committee on Theoretical and Applied Mechanics (USNC/TAM) in 2010–2012.

Collins was elected Member-at-Large of the American Academy of Arts and Sciences Engineering Section in 2014. Until May 2020, he served on the Alan T. Waterman Award Committee for the National Science Foundation.

Collins has been a member of the board of trustees of the Mitre Corporation since 2018. He is currently a member of the Leadership Advisory Board of the University of Michigan College of Engineering.

== Research ==
Collins conducts research on turbulent processes with numerical simulations, for example in flames. He studies turbulent coagulation of aerosol particles, the turbulent breakup of microstructures such as in droplets or red blood cells, and drag reduction due to polymer additives. Collins is also developing new models to describe such microturbulence processes.

== Honors ==
- 1990: Dow Young Minority Investigator Award
- 1997: Best Paper Award American Institute of Chemical Engineers (AIChE) (for work on mechanisms of droplet breakup in turbulence)
- 2005: Fellow of the American Institute of Chemical Engineers
- 2007: Fellow of the American Physical Society
- 2014: Fellow of the American Association for the Advancement of Science (AAAS)
- 2014: William W. Grimes Award for Excellence in Chemical Engineering, AIChE Minority Affairs Committee
- 2015: Pioneer of Diversity Award, AIChE Minority Affairs Committee
- 2017: inaugural Mosaic Medal of Distinction
- 2018: Edward Bouchet Legacy Award, Edward Bouchet Society
- 2021: Member of the National Academy of Engineering
