= Syman =

Artificial intelligence technology

- Developer(s): Identified (company) Workday, Inc. since 2014
- Initial release: 2013
- Website: www.identified.com/technology

SYMAN is an artificial intelligence technology that uses data from social media profiles to identify trends in the job market. SYMAN is designed to organize actionable data for products and services including recruiting, human capital management, CRM, and marketing.

SYMAN was developed with a $21 million series B financing round secured by Identified, which was led by VantagePoint Capital Partners and Capricorn Investment Group.

== See also ==
- Workday
