= Lynden Archer =

American chemical engineer

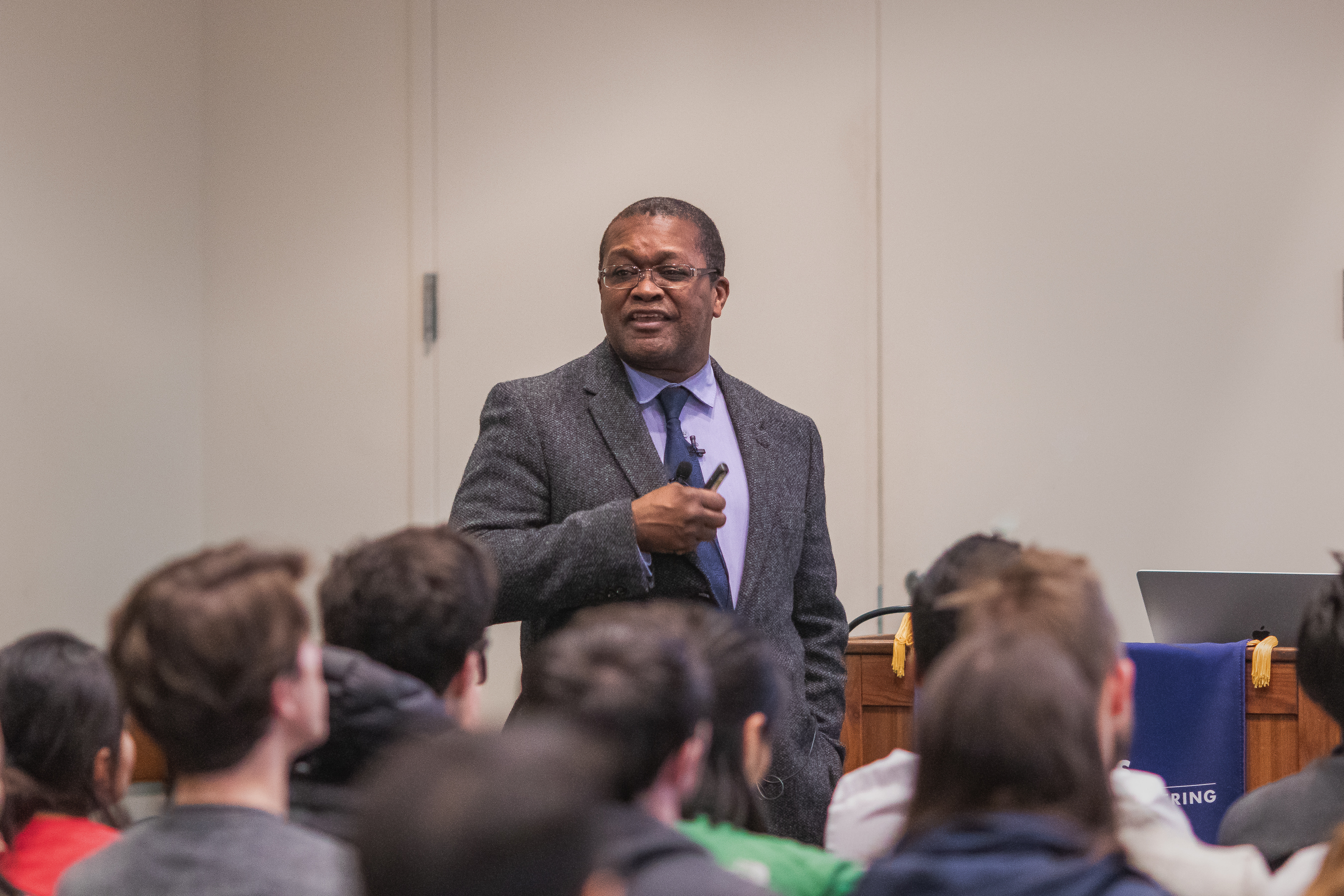
- Education: Stanford University (PhD, 1993; MS, 1990); University of Southern California (BS, 1989)
- Awards: Member of the National Academy Engineering (2018); Fellow of the American Physical Society (2007)
- Scientific career
- Fields: Chemical engineering
- Workplaces: Cornell University

Lynden A. Archer is a chemical engineer, Joseph Silbert Dean of Engineering, David Croll Director of the Energy Systems Institute, and professor of chemical engineering at Cornell University. He became a fellow of the American Physical Society in 2007 and was elected into the National Academy of Engineering in 2018. Archer's research covers polymer and hybrid materials and finds applications in energy storage technologies. His h-index is 92 by Google Scholar.

== Education ==
Archer was born and raised in Guyana and wanted to be a ceramics engineer in high school. He received one of the first international merit scholarships from the University of Southern California in 1986, and as an undergraduate student, decided to work with polymers in his first semester.

In 1989, Archer graduated from the University of Southern California with a BS degree in chemical engineering (polymer science). He earned his MS and PhD in chemical engineering from Stanford University in 1990 and 1993, respectively. Subsequently, Archer worked as a postdoctoral member of the technical staff at AT&T Bell Laboratories in 1994.

== Career ==
Archer is the James A. Friend Family Distinguished Professor of Chemical and Biomolecular Engineering at Cornell University. He joined the faculty at Cornell in 2000. Archer served as William C. Hooey Director of the Smith School of Chemical and Biomolecular Engineering at Cornell University from 2010 to 2016. Before joining Cornell, Archer was a chemical engineering faculty member at Texas A&M University, 1994–1999.

Archer is the David Croll Director of the Cornell Energy Systems Institute. Since 2008, Archer has served as co-director of the KAUST-Cornell Center for Energy and Sustainability. He is also a co-director of Cornell's Center for Nanomaterials Engineering and Technology (CNET). Archer has presented at the Renewable & Sustainable Energy Technology Workshop hosted by the NSF-IGERT Clean Energy for Green Industry graduate fellowship program in 2012.

On June 8, 2020, Cornell announced that Archer was named to be Joseph Silbert Dean of Engineering for a five-year term starting on July 1, 2020. Archer is the second Black American to hold this position, after his direct predecessor Lance Collins.

Archer is an advisory board member of the Carbon XPrize. He is also on the editorial board of Green Energy & Environment.

In 2011, Archer and his wife Shivaun Archer, who works at the Meinig School of Biomedical Engineering at Cornell University, cofounded the technology company NOHMs Technologies Inc. based on his research of Nanoscale Organic Hybrid Materials (NOHMs) licensed from the Cornell Center for Technology Licensing. NOHMs Technologies was selected as one of C&EN’s 10 Start-Ups to Watch in 2015 and was awarded two Small Business Innovation Research Phase I grants.

Archer was profiled in the Here and Now program produced by NPR and WBUR in 2016. Scientific American listed Archer's development of an electrochemical cell that captures carbon dioxide among their top 10 "World Changing Ideas" for 2016.

In 2018, Archer was elected as a member into the National Academy of Engineering for advances in nanoparticle-polymer hybrid materials and in electrochemical energy storage technologies.

== Research ==
Archer's research is focused on transport properties of polymers and organic-inorganic hybrid materials, as well as their applications for energy storage and carbon capture technologies. His research spans several different battery components.

=== Electrolytes ===
Archer discovered that adding certain halide salts to liquid electrolytes creates nanostructured surface coatings on lithium battery anodes that hinder the development of dendritic structures that grow within the battery cell and typically lead to a decline in performance and overheating. This study was conducted by modeling metal electrodeposition using density functional theory and continuum mechanics.

By adding tin to a carbonate-based electrolyte, Archer's group observed the instantaneous formation of a nanometer-thick interface that shields the anode and prevents dendrite formation, but keeps it electrochemically active. Lithium can rapidly alloy with the added tin, which makes the lithium deposition during recharging more uniform. As a result, a lithium anode with a tin interface had a battery life cycle of more than 500 hours at 3 mA/cm^{2}, as opposed to 55 hours without the protective interface. Tin requires minimal amounts of specialized equipment and processing. In a cheaper sodium anode, battery lifetime could be improved from less than 10 to more than 1,700 hours.

Another way of preventing dendrite growth in batteries that Archer investigated was the addition of large polymers to the liquid electrolyte. The consistency of the liquid is altered: it becomes viscoelastic, which suppresses electroconvection and therefore prevents flow in patterns that enable dendrite formation. Archer also investigated the polymerization of a previously liquid electrolyte inside the electrochemical cell, which can improve the contact between the electrolyte and electrodes.

=== Membranes ===
Another way of inhibiting dendrite growth that Archer investigated is the incorporation of a porous nanostructured membrane, which prevents the formation of subsurface structures in the lithium electrode. The key nanoscale organic hybrid materials (NOHMs) were formed by grafting polyethylene oxide onto silica, subsequently cross-linked with polypropylene oxide to create strong, porous membranes. The intermediate porosity allows liquid electrolytes to flow but prevents dendrites from passing through. The incorporation of such membranes does not require significant changes in battery design. Archer's group found that such a porous electrolyte effectively lengthens the route along which ions travel between anode and cathode and thus increases the life of the anode. Additionally, the porous polymer membrane is softer than the metal, but can nonetheless act as an effective separator suppressing dendritic growth due to its tortuos nanostructure.

Archer investigated how tethering anions to the separator membrane in a battery can stabilize an electrochemical cell, which uses reactive metals as electrodes. The electric field at the metal electrode is reduced, which enhances stability during battery recharging even at higher currents, where usually a depletion zone forms due to ion migration, which in turn initiates dendrite growth. This depletion zone can be neutralized by permanently tethering anions to the membrane, which ultimately prevents battery failure. The method can be applied to lithium batteries, but also to batteries made of sodium or aluminum.

=== Anodes ===
In exploring alternative materials to lithium to be used in batteries, Archer discovered a way of treating aluminum films to prevent the formation of an aluminum oxide layer that prevents electrical charge transfer. The aluminum is coated with an ionic liquid containing chloride ions and a small nitrogen-containing organic compound. This treatment erodes existing aluminum oxide and prevents the formation of additional oxide.

Archer's research uncovered a way to build a low-cost zinc-anode battery with epitaxy by growing zinc on graphene, which creates a very stable, high-density energy storage in a reversible manner due to its electrochemical inertness.

Archer studied electrochemical cells that can both capture carbon dioxide and produce electricity. These devices consist of an aluminum foil anode, a porous and electrically conductive cathode, which allows for carbon dioxide and oxygen to pass through, and a liquid electrolyte bridging the anode and cathode through which molecules can diffuse. In experiments, such electrochemical cells generated 13 Ampere hours for each gram of captured carbon and converted carbon dioxide into aluminum oxalate, which can then be converted into oxalic acid.

== Honors ==
- 1995: 3M Company Non-Tenured Faculty Award
- 1996: NSF CAREER Award
- 1996-1999: DuPont Young Professor Award
- 2007: Fellow of the American Physical Society
- 2008: King Abdullah University of Science and Technology (KAUST) Global Research Partnership Award
- 2010: New Hot Paper January 2010 in Materials Science
- 2012: Distinguished Mork Family Department Alumnus Award, USC Viterbi School of Engineering
- 2013: National Science Foundation, Division of Materials Research, Award for Special Creativity
- 2014: American Institute of Chemical Engineers Nanoscale Science and Engineering Forum Award
- 2014-2016: Thomson Reuters World's Most Influential Scientific Minds in Materials Science
- 2015: University of Texas at Austin Cockrell School of Engineering Endowed Lectureship
- 2016: NSF Distinguished Lectureship in Mathematical & Physical Sciences
- 2016: Waterloo Institute for Nanotechnology (WIN) Distinguished Lecture
- 2017: Molecular Science Forum Lecture, Institute of Chemistry, Chinese Academy of Sciences
- 2018: Member of the National Academy of Engineering
- 2019: Highly Cited Researcher by Web of Science
- 2019: 44th Annual David M. Mason Lecture in Chemical Engineering, Stanford University
- 2020: University of California, Davis College of Engineering's Winter 2020 Distinguished Lecture
- 2020: Purdue University, Purdue Engineering Distinguished Lecture Series Presenter
- 2020: Fellow of the Society of Rheology
