= Workday =

Workday may refer to:

- Workday, Inc., a cloud-based business applications company
- A day in the workweek
- Working time, the period of time in a day spent at paid occupational labor
