= Mauro Ferrari =

Italian scientist

- Born: 7 July 1959 (age 67); Padua, Italy
- Education: University of California Berkeley MS, PhD (Mechanical Engineering); University of Padua, Italy Dottore, Mathematics)
- Known for: Nanomedicine; Cancer Therapeutics; Nanofluidics; Drug delivery; Biomedical microtechnology; Bioethics
- Spouse: Paola Ferrari (m. 1995)
- Children: 5
- Awards: National Academy of Sciences Italy; National Academy of Sciences Europe; Blaise Pascal Medal in Biomedical Engineering (2012); Department of Defense Innovator Award (2009-2014); Fellow, American Association for the Advancement of Science (2009); Aurel Stodola Medal (2005)
- Scientific career
- Fields: Nanomedicine
- Workplaces: Houston Methodist; University of Texas; National Cancer Institute; Ohio State University; University of California Berkeley
- Website: www.houstonmethodist.org/research/our-faculty/labs/ferrari-lab/

Mauro Ferrari (born 7 July 1959) is a nanoscientist and leader in the field of nanomedicine. He served as special expert on nanotechnology for the National Cancer Institute (2003-2005) and was instrumental in establishing the Alliance for Nanotechnology in Cancer in 2004.

Ferrari held tenured academic positions at UC Berkeley, Ohio State University, MD Anderson Cancer Center, and the University of Texas Health Science Center.

== Early life and education ==
Ferrari was born in Padua, Italy in 1959. He spent his early years in Udine and Florence before attending the University of Padova and earning his Laurea (PhD) in Mathematics in 1985. He moved to Berkeley, California where he earned a master's degree and a doctorate in mechanical engineering from the University of California Berkeley.

== Career ==
=== Professor of Engineering ===
Ferrari became an associate professor of engineering at Berkeley, then moved to the Ohio State University as professor of bioengineering, internal medicine, and mechanical engineering. He studied medicine at the Ohio State University concurrent with his faculty appointment from 2002-2004.

=== Cancer research ===
He moved to the MD Anderson Cancer Center and University of Texas Health Science Center at Houston, TX to become the chair of the department of nanomedicine and biomedical engineering, and then in 2010 accepted the position of president and CEO of the Houston Methodist Research Institute in Houston, TX. Ferrari was appointed as Chief Commercialization Officer of Houston Methodist in 2018, and retired in 2019.

=== ERC President (2020) ===
In 2019, the European Commission announced the appointment of Ferrari as the next President of the European Research Council (ERC), succeeding Jean-Pierre Bourguignon; he was selected by a search committee chaired by Mario Monti. On 1 January 2020, Ferrari assumed the position of president of the European Research Council (ERC).

Ferrari resigned in 7 April 2020, citing his disappointment at the lack of coordinated EU action to address the COVID-19 pandemic and expressing frustration over opposition to his efforts to launch a scientific program to combat the virus. Ferrari was not alone in his criticism of the EU response to COVID-19.

The ERC countered that calling for specific research was contrary to their mandate. According to Science Magazine, "ERC, set up to reward bottom-up basic research ideas, does not designate money for specific research areas....Other EU organ[ization]s can and do pay for research in particular fields, including COVID-19, but ERC is designed to protect science from politics. Ferrari writes that 'the expected burden of death, suffering, societal transformation, and economic devastation' of the pandemic justifies breaking this rule."

The ERC responded on 8 April 2020: "...we regret Professor Ferrari's statement, which at best is economical with the truth." The ERC stated that on 27 March 2020, following a no-confidence vote by the ERC's Scientific Council, they "requested that Mauro Ferrari resign from his position as ERC’s President". They cited poor conduct in office, exploiting the position to further his own projects, and for consistently failing to represent the interests of the ERC.

Ferrari disputed the ERC claims of his failing to meet his obligations and their accusations of inappropriate outside involvements. In the months following Ferrari's resignation, the EU itself debated whether some funding of the ERC should include some focused research on COVID-19; which is what Ferrari advocated and the ERC adamantly opposed.

== Other activities ==
=== Corporate boards ===
- AMBER, Member of the Scientific Advisory Board
- Arrowhead Pharmaceuticals, Member of the Board of Directors (2010–present)
- Dead Sea Research Institute, President of the int'l board of governors
- Leonardo Biosystems, Member of the Board of Directors
- NanoMedical Systems, Member of the Board of Directors

=== Non-profit organizations ===
- Member of the Engineering Leadership Board, Cullen College of Engineering, University of Houston

== Research interests ==
Ferrari's research uses nanotechnology, microtechnology, physical sciences, mathematics, biomechanics, and material sciences to develop new technologies for health care applications like drug delivery and cancer therapeutics. He leads a physical sciences in oncology center, one of a network of centers sponsored by the National Institutes of Health National Cancer Center. The research of this center focuses on understanding the physical and biomechanical biological barriers that reduce the efficacy of cancer therapeutics. He developed a new drug called iNPG-pDox, composed of silicon nanoparticles loaded with polymeric doxorubicin, that had better results at lower doses in animal models compared to standard doxorubicin chemotherapy for metastatic breast cancer.

== Published works ==
Ferrari has produced more than 350 publications, including seven books and 41 issued patents in the US and Europe. In June 2020, Ferrari and his lab colleagues had a publication retracted from Science Advances Journal due to various image duplications suggesting possible scientific misconduct.

=== Books ===
- Ferrari M, Granik VT, Imam A, Nadeau J, editors. Advances in Doublet Mechanics. Lecture Notes in Physics, New Series M: Monographs, vol. m 45. Berlin, Heidelberg, New York: Springer Verlag; 1997. ISBN 978-3-540-49636-6
- Ferrari M. Micro- and Nanofabricated Electro-Optical Mechanical Systems for Biomedical and Environmental Applications. SPIE, The International Society for Optical Engineering; 1999 Jan. ISBN 9780819423894
- Lee A, Lee J, Ferrari M, editors. BioMEMS and Biomedical Nanotechnology. Vol I: Biological and Biomedical Nanotechnology. Springer. 2006. ISBN 978-0-387-25842-3
- Ozkan M, Heller M, Ferrari M, editors. BioMEMS and Biomedical Nanotechnology. Vol II: Micro/Nanotechnologies for Genomics and Proteomics. Springer. 2006. ISBN 978-0387255644
- Desai T, Bhatia SN, Ferrari M, editors. BioMEMS and Biomedical Nanotechnology. Vol III: Therapeutic Micro/Nanotechnologies. Springer. 2006. ISBN 978-1850758600
- Bashir R, Werely S, Ferrari M, editors. BioMEMS and Biomedical Nanotechnology. Vol IV: Biomolecular Sensing, Processing, and Analysis. Springer. 2006. ISBN 978-0387255668
- Cristini V, Ferrari M, Decuzzi P, editors. Nanoparticulate Delivery to Cancerous Lesions: Advances in Mathematical Modeling. Ferrari M, series editor. Fundamental Biomedical Technologies. Vol. 2. Springer. April 2010. ISBN 978-0387290850

=== Journal articles ===
- Xu R, et al. (2016). "An injectable nanoparticle generator enhances delivery of cancer therapeutics". Nat Biotechnol. 34 (4): 414–8. doi:10.1038/nbt.3506. PMC 5070674. PMID 26974511.
- Blanco E, et al. (2014). "Co-localized delivery of rapamycin and paclitaxel to tumors enhances synergistic targeting of the PI3K/Akt/mTOR". Molecular Therapy. 22 (7): 1310–9. doi:10.1038/mt.2014.27. PMC 4088997. PMID 24569835.
- Dave B, et al. (2014). "Targeting RPL39 and MLF2 reduce tumor initiation and metastasis in breast cancer by inhibiting nitric oxide syn". Proceedings of the National Academy of Sciences. 111 (24): 8838–43. doi:10.1073/pnas.1320769111. PMC 4066479. PMID 24876273.
- Chen X, et al. (2014). "XBP1 promotes triple negative breast cancer by controlling the HIF1α pathway". Nature. 508 (7494): 103–107. Bibcode:2014Natur.508..103C. doi:10.1038/nature13119. PMC 4105133. PMID 24670641.
- Parodi A, et al. (2013). "Synthetic nanoparticles functionalized with biomimetic leukocyte membranes possess cell-like functions". Nature Nanotechnology. 8 (1): 61–68. Bibcode:2013NatNa...8...61P. doi:10.1038/nnano.2012.212. PMC 3751189. PMID 23241654.
- Hall R, Sun T, Ferrari M (2012). "A portrait of nanomedicine and its bioethical implications". Journal of Law, Medicine & Ethics. 40 (4): 763–779. doi:10.1111/j.1748-720X.2012.00705.x. PMID 23289679. S2CID 16678752.
- Michor F, Liphardt J, Ferrari M, Widom J (2011). "What does physics have to do with cancer?". Nature Reviews Cancer. 11 (9): 657–670. doi:10.1038/nrc3092. PMC 3711102. PMID 21850037.
- Ananta JS, et al. (2010). "Geometrical confinement of gadolinium-based contrast agents in nanoporous particles enhances T1 contrast". Nature Nanotechnology. 5 (11): 815–821. Bibcode:2010NatNa...5..815A. doi:10.1038/nnano.2010.203. PMC 2974055. PMID 20972435.
- Ferrari M (2010). "Vectoring siRNA therapeutics into the clinic". Nature Reviews Clinical Oncology. 7 (9): 485–6. doi:10.1038/nrclinonc.2010.131. PMID 20798696. S2CID 41070268.
- Evans J (2009). "Five big ideas for nanotechnology". Nature Medicine. 15 (4): 348. doi:10.1038/nm0409-348. PMID 19349991. S2CID 205377524.
- Ferrari M (2009). "Straight talk with Mauro Ferrari". Nature Medicine. 15 (7): 716–7. doi:10.1038/nm0709-716. PMID 19584847. S2CID 205380426.
- Gewin, V (2009). "Big opportunities in a small world". Nature. 460 (7254): 540–1. doi:10.1038/nj7254-540a. PMID 19637403.
- Ferrari M (2008). "Nanogeometry: Beyond Drug Delivery". Nature Nanotechnology. 3 (3): 131–132. Bibcode:2008NatNa...3..131F. doi:10.1038/nnano.2008.46. PMID 18654480.
- Sanhai W, Sakamoto J, Canady R, Ferrari M (2008). "Seven Challenges for Nanomedicine". Nature Nanotechnology. 3 (5): 242–244. Bibcode:2008NatNa...3..242S. doi:10.1038/nnano.2008.114. PMID 18654511.
- Cheng M, et al. (2006). "Nanotechnologies for Biomolecular Detection and Medical Diagnostics". Current Opinion in Chemical Biology. 10 (1): 11–19. doi:10.1016/j.cbpa.2006.01.006. PMID 16418011.
- Sanga S, Sinek J, Frieboes H, Ferrari M, Fruehauf J, Christini V (2006). "Mathematical Modeling of Cancer Progression and Response to Chemotherapy". Expert Review of Anticancer Therapy. 6 (10): 1361–1376. doi:10.1586/14737140.6.10.1361. PMID 17069522. S2CID 20253749.
- Decuzzi P, Lee S, Bhushan B, Ferrari M (2005). "A Theoretical Model for the Margination of Particles within Blood Vessels". Annals of Biomedical Engineering. 33 (2): 179–190. doi:10.1007/s10439-005-8976-5. PMID 15771271. S2CID 1705344.
- Ferrari M (2005). "Cancer nanotechnology: opportunities and challenges". Nature Reviews Cancer. 5 (3): 161–171. doi:10.1038/nrc1566. PMID 15738981. S2CID 340845.
- Liotta L, Ferrari M, and Petricoin E (2003). "Clinical proteomics: Written in blood". Nature. 425 (6961): 905. Bibcode:2003Natur.425..905L. doi:10.1038/425905a. PMID 14586448. S2CID 34755301.

=== Patents ===
- WO application 201517777, Fine D, Grattoni A, Ferrari M, Liu X, Goodall R, Hosali S, "Therapeutic microdevices and methods of making and using same", published 2015
- US patent 8926994, Ferrari M, Serda R, Meraz IM, Gu J, Xia X, Shen H, Sun T, "Mesoporous silicon particles for the presentation of tumor antigens and adjuvant for anti-cancer immunity", published 2015
- US patent 8685755, Ferrari M, Tasciotti E, Liu X, Bouamrani A, Hu Y, "Combinational multidomain mesoporous chips and a method for fractionation, stabilization, and storage of biomolecules", published 2014
- US patent 8753897, Ferrari M, Cheng MM-C, Cuda G, Gaspari M, Geho D, Liotta L, Petricoin E, Robertson F, Terracciano R, "Nanoporous substrates for the [sic] analytical methods", published 2014
- US patent 8920625, Ferrari M, Liu X, Cheng MC, "Electrochemical method of making porous particles using a constant current density", published 2014
- US patent 8361508, Decuzzi P, Ferrari M, "Endocytotic Particles", published 2013
- US patent 8480637, Ferrari M, Liu X, Grattoni, Fine D, Goodall R, Hosali S, Medema R, Hudson L, "Nanochanneled device and related methods", published 2013
- US patent 8563022, Decuzzi P, Ferrari M, "Particles for cell targeting", published 2013
- US patent 8568877, Ferrari M, Liu X, Chiappini C, Fakhoury JR, "Porous and non-porous nanostructures", published 2013
- US patent 8173115, Ferrari M, Decuzzi P, "Particle compositions with a pre-selected cell internalization mode", published 2012
- US patent 7993271, Liu J, Ferrari M, Rokhlin SI, Sedmark DD, "System and method for screening tissue", published 2011
- US patent 6355270, Ferrari M, Dehlinger PJ, Martin FJ, Grove CF, Friend DR, "Particles for oral delivery of peptides and proteins", published 2002
- US patent 6405066, Essenpreis M, Desai TA, Ferrari M, Hansford DJ, "Implantable analyte sensor", published 2002
- US patent 6015559, Keller CG, Ferrari M, "High vertical aspect ratio thin film structures", published 2000
- US patent 6044981, Chu WH, Ferrari M, "Microfabricated filter with specially constructed channel walls and containment well, and capsule constructed with such filters [II]", published 2000
- US patent 6107102, Ferrari M, "Therapeutic microdevices and methods of making and using same", published 2000
- US patent 5985164, Chu WH, Ferrari M, "Method for forming a filter", published 1999
- US patent 5893974, Keller CG, Ferrari M, "Microfabricated capsules for immunological isolation of cell transplants", published 1999
- US patent 5938923, Tu J, Ferrari M, "Microfabricated filter and capsule using a substrate sandwich", published 1999
- US patent 5948255, Keller CG, Ferrari M, "Microfabricated particle thin film filter and method of making it", published 1999
- US patent 5985328, Chu WH, Ferrari M, "Micromachined porous membranes with bulk support [II]", published 1999
- US patent 5770076, Chu WH, Ferrari M, "Micromachined capsules having porous membranes and bulk supports [I]", published 1998
- US patent 5798042, Chu WH, Ferrari M, "Microfabricated filter with specially constructed channel walls and containment well, and capsule constructed with such filters [I]", published 1998

== Honors, decorations, awards and distinctions ==
- 2008 Fellow, American Institute for Medical and Biological Engineering
- 2009 Fellow, American Association for the Advancement of Science
- 2011 Founders Award, Controlled Release Society
- 2015 Aurel Stodola Medal, Mechanical Engineering, ETH Zurich, Switzerland

== Personal life ==
Ferrari met and married his first wife Marialuisa while they were both students at the University of Padova, and they moved to Berkeley, California. While he was faculty at the University of California Berkeley, Marialuisa died from cancer. Ferrari married Paola Del Zotto from Udine, Italy in 1995. He has five children, including two sets of twins.
