= Lawrence Larson =

American engineer

Lawrence E. Larson

Provost of Brown University
- Acting
- Assumed office January 1, 2023
- Preceded by: Richard M. Locke

Personal details
- Education: Cornell University; UCLA

Academic work
- Institutions: HRL Laboratories; UCSD; Brown University

Lawrence E. Larson is an American electrical engineer, and served as interim provost of Brown University in 2023. Previously, he was the Sorensen Family Dean of Engineering and Founding Dean at the Brown University School of Engineering. He is a Life Fellow of the Institute of Electrical and Electronics Engineers

== Education ==
Larson received a B.Sc. and M.Eng from Cornell University in 1979 and 1980. He received his doctorate and MBA from the University of California, Los Angeles in 1986 and 1996.

== Career ==
From 1980 to 1996, Larson worked at HRL Laboratories in Malibu, California. In 1996, he joined the faculty of the University of California, San Diego, where he was inaugural Communications Industry Chair. From 2001-2007, Larson was the Director of the UCSD Center for Wireless Communications. From 2007 to 2011, he served as Chair of the Department of Electrical and Computer Engineering at UCSD's Jacobs School of Engineering.

=== Brown University School of Engineering ===
Larson was named inaugural dean of the Brown University School of Engineering in March 2011. During Larson's tenure as dean the number of tenure-track engineering faculty grew by 40% and external research funding increased significantly. His deanship also saw the construction of Brown's Engineering Research Center, which increased the school's research lab space by 22%. In 2021, Larson announced plans to step down from the position in June 2022. After leaving the position, Larson plans to remain at Brown as a professor and researcher.

== Background ==
Larson is the son of American nuclear scientist Clarence Larson and grandson of medical professor and radiologist Stafford Warren.
