= Aneel Bhusri =

Indian-American business executive

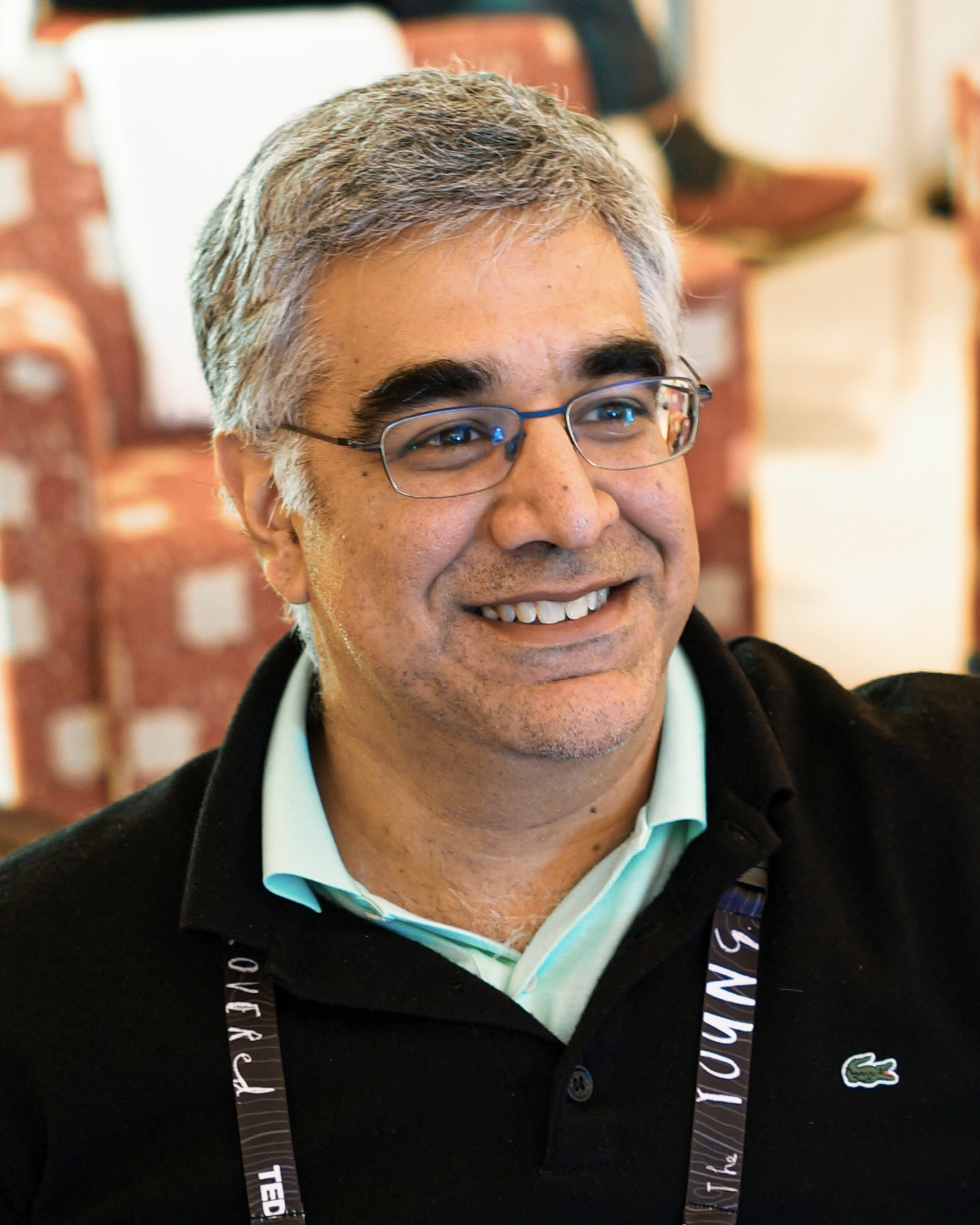
- Bhusri in 2013
- Born: February 14, 1966 (age 60); Pittsford, New York
- Education: Brown University (B.Sc.); Stanford University (M.B.A.)
- Occupation: Businessman
- Employers: Workday; Greylock
- Known for: Co-founder of Workday Inc.
- Title: Chairman and CEO, Workday
- Spouse: Allison Thoreson
- Children: 2

Aneel Bhusri (born February 14, 1966) is an American business executive. He is the chairman and chief executive officer of Workday, the company he co-founded in 2005. He is also a partner at Greylock Partners and was a member of Intel's board of directors between 2014 and 2019. Bhusri has been a billionaire since 2014; as of 2021 he has a net worth of $3.1 billion.

== Early life ==
Aneel Bhusri was born in an Indian-American family of Punjabi descent, in Pittsford, New York on February 14, 1966. He was educated at Brown University, receiving a Bachelor of Science degree in electrical engineering. He has an MBA from Stanford Graduate School of Business. His first job after college was as a corporate finance analyst at Morgan Stanley.

== Career ==
In 1993, Bhusri became the director of planning at PeopleSoft, then primarily a human resources software company. Later, working for David Duffield, with whom he went on to co-found Workday, he became responsible for product strategy and marketing. In 1999, he became vice chairman of the company, serving in that role until the takeover by Oracle in 2004. In the meantime, PeopleSoft had developed ERP, CRM, and other offerings, in addition to Human Resource Management.

Also since 1999, Bhusri has been a partner at Greylock Partners, a venture capital firm which has backed companies including Facebook, Groupon, Dropbox, Tumblr and Airbnb. At Greylock he has been an investor in cloud technologies, with an emphasis on applications, data center infrastructure and middleware, and serves on the boards of a number of companies in which Greylock has invested, including Cloudera and Pure Storage.

=== Workday ===
In 2003, Oracle made a $13 billion bid in a hostile corporate takeover attempt of PeopleSoft. This and later offers were rejected by PeopleSoft's board of directors. Despite a U.S. Department of Justice suit to block the takeover, on the grounds of anti-trust infringement, in December 2004, Oracle announced that it had signed a definitive agreement to acquire PeopleSoft for approximately $10.3 billion. In 2005, Workday was co-founded by David Duffield and Bhusri with funding from Greylock Partners. Workday sells software and services using the SaaS model.

Bhusri is the chief executive officer (CEO) at Workday. He is also a member of the company's board of directors, and served as chairman of the board from 2012 until May 2014.

In April 2020, Bhusri donated $1 million to the Give2SF fund, a donation drive to help residents and businesses in San Francisco affected by the coronavirus pandemic.

In 2020, he was ranked No. 359 on the Forbes 400 list of the richest people in America.

In January 2024, Bhusri stepped down as CEO of Workday, and Carl Eschenbach assumed the role. Prior to the transition, Bhusri and Eschenbach served together as co-CEOs since 2022. In 2024, Bhusri transitioned to the role of full-time executive chair of the board. In February 2026, he took over as CEO once again.

== Media appearances ==
Bhusri was interviewed by Reid Hoffman on the Masters of Scale podcast, where he talked about interviewing his first 500 employees at Workday to shape its company culture.

== Awards ==
- 2013 EY Entrepreneur of the Year Award Recipient
- 2020 Great Place to Work CEO For All Leadership Award
