= Mary Reed Hall =

Academic building in Colorado, US

Coordinates: 39°40′36″N 104°57′41″W

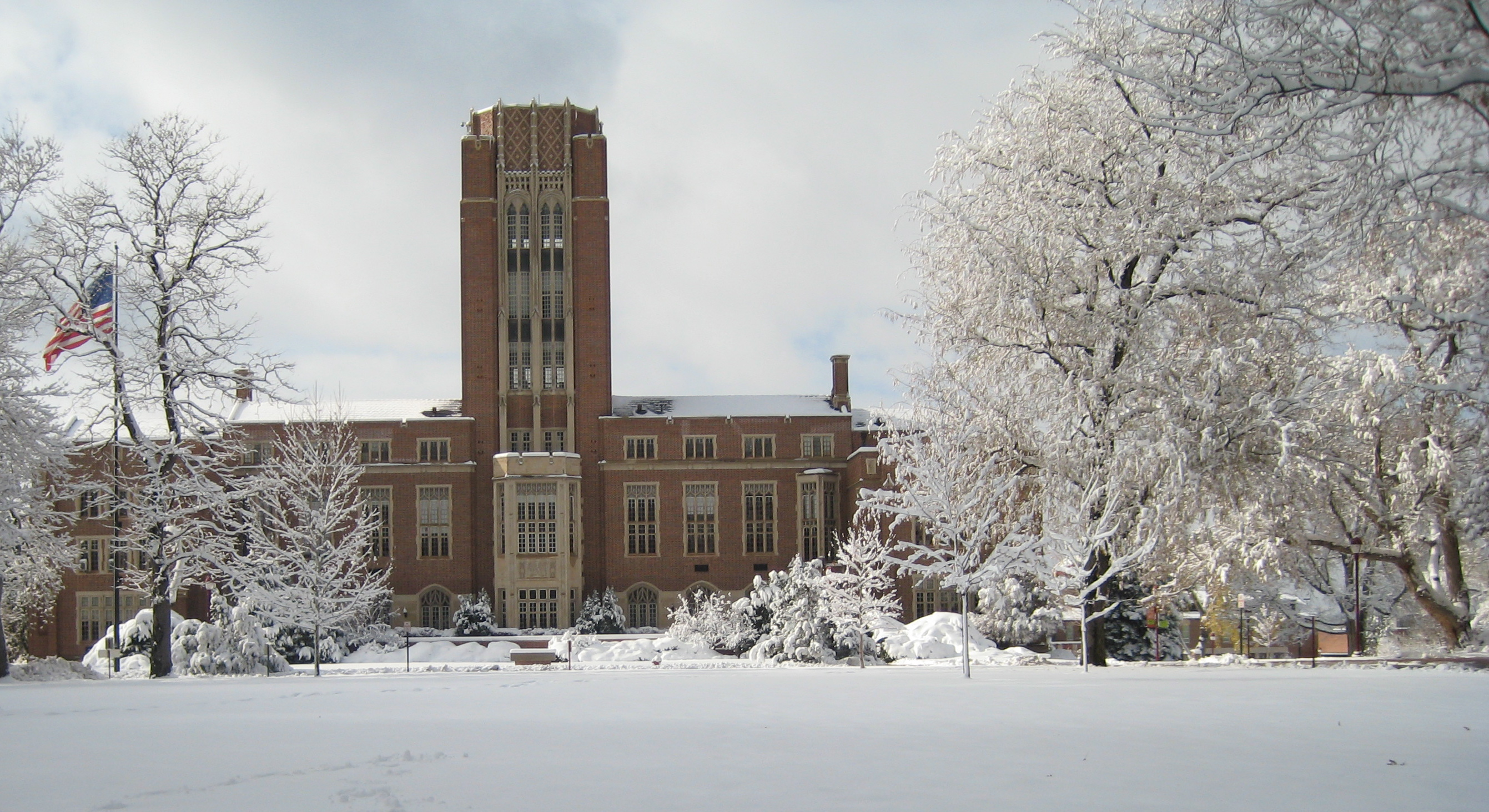
Mary Reed Hall in 2010

Mary Reed Hall is located on the University of Denver campus in Denver, Colorado, United States, southwest of University Hall. It was built in 1932 as a new library to replace the Andrew S. Carnegie library. The building, named after Mary D. Reed, was first used in January 1933. When Penrose Library (which is now Anderson Academic Commons) was built in 1972, the building was decommissioned. The Mary Reed Building now houses administrative offices, including those of the chancellor and provost. The hall's main architectural feature of its central tower has become an iconic image for the university, its likeness appearing on stationery, graduation announcements, class rings, and other memorabilia.

== Mary and Verner Reed ==
Ohio natives, Mary Reed and her husband Verner Reed moved to Colorado in 1893. Verner Reed was very prosperous from mining, ranching, banking and irrigation in Colorado. When he died in April 1919, he left his wife Mary with an estate worth $20 million, equal to nearly $400 million today. Mary Reed used the money acquired from the estate and donated nearly $500,000 to the university to fund and construct a new library. Over the years, Reed added more than $200,000 to her previous contributions, served on the board of trustees and received an honorary degree in 1939. Mary Reed died in April 1945.

== Planning ==
Planning for the library began in 1931 after Mary Reed made her donation to the university. The University of Denver chose a site that was centrally located on campus and that had a view of the Rocky Mountains. Denver local, Harry J. Manning was selected by Reed to be the architect for the building.

== Construction ==
The building was funded by $500,000 donated by Mary Reed. The donation of the money was dedicated in a three-day celebration in October 1932. A. Danielson & Son were selected to construct the building and the process began on September 5, 1931. The red bricks used on the Mary Reed Building were specially made by Denver Sewer Pipe and Clay Company and Indiana limestone. With a 126-foot (38 m) central tower, the building was supposed to reflect a modified collegiate gothic style structure. On February 12, 1932, the Mary Reed Building's cornerstone was laid.

In the summer of 2008, construction workers spent time tuck-pointing the building. This process involves replacing old mortar in order to better bind the bricks together. The hope is that this process will allow the Mary Reed Building to stand strong for the next 100 years.

== Features ==
The Mary Reed Building is 63,761 square feet (5,923.6 m^{2}) and has four stories. The facility boasts gothic arches and windows, wrought-iron railings with aluminum caps, exhibit cases, cathedral lights specially designed with bronze and iron, and terrazzo stairways and corner halls. The building holds a number of seminar and conference rooms, along with administrative offices. A Renaissance Room was opened for students to read and browse books. Furthermore, there was a treasure room mainly for rare books and manuscripts and exhibit rooms for archaeology and art displays. Mary Reed's portrait hangs in the Renaissance Room in honor of a request she made before her death and to remind the public of her generosity to the University of Denver. The back of the building is home to the Harper Humanities Garden, which features a number of fountains, which connect the Mary Reed Building to the Evans Chapel.

== Ghosts ==
The Mary Reed Building has been said to be haunted for many years. The custodial staff often reports strange happenings within the historic building. Examples include books being strewn around locked rooms, sightings of a ghostly woman, and alarms going off when the building is deserted. There are even reports that a chair in the old library often feels warm as though someone just sat in it when, in fact, it had been empty for hours. Because of these spooky experiences, it is common for staff to refuse to enter the building late at night.

Some believe that the spirit is Mary Reed herself haunting the building. Others think that it is University of Denver alumna Margery Reed, who died in 1925. The DuPont room, in which a ghost has been reported, is said to be haunted by Marcella Miller DuPont, who made a donation for a study room in the Mary Reed Building.

== See also ==
- University of Denver
- Robert Coombe
- Denver Boone
- Newman Center
- Daniels College of Business
- Josef Korbel School of International Studies
