= Maurice Bernard Mitchell =

Maurice Bernard Mitchell was inaugurated as the 13th chancellor of the University of Denver on October 20, 1967. Mitchell was a publishing executive and an educator. He had extensive experience in sales, broadcasting, editing, publishing, printing and administration.

== Background ==
Mitchell was born on February 9, 1915, in New York City. He attended New York University (NYU) from 1932–1935. He left NYU in 1935 and joined the New York Times advertising staff. The next year until he was hired as both advertising director and editor of Gouverneur Tribune Press, a country weekly in New York. He became assistant publisher of two upstate New York daily papers: the Ogdensburg Journal(1938–1939) and the Rochester Times-Union (1940–1941). From 1941–1943, he was the National Advertising Manager of another upstate New York daily paper, the Albany Knickerbocker News. He served in the Army Tank Corp during World War II and joined Columbia Broadcasting System (CBS) in 1945 shortly after the war. In 1948 Mitchell left CBS and joined the National Association of Broadcasters in Washington, D.C. From 1949-1950 he was the managing director of the Broadcast Advertising Bureau in New York City. He worked at NBC in 1950 and then became vice president of the Program Service Division at Muzak Corporation in New York City, where he worked from 1950 to 1953. He then became Director of the same company from 1953 to 1958. Mitchell joined Encyclopædia Britannica, Inc. as president and director of Encyclopædia Britannica Films Inc. in 1953. He became president of Encyclopædia Britannica Inc. (Chicago and all subsidiary) in 1962, a position he held until 1967. He was also director of the Federal Reserve Bank of Kansas City from 1972 to 1976. Mitchell received LL.D. honors from the University of Denver in 1958; West Virginia Wesleyan University in 1978; National College Education in 1969; National University, San Diego in 1986 and Colorado State University in 1971.

== Career ==
Maurice B. Mitchell was the 13th chancellor of the University of Denver from 1967–1977. During his tenure the University's new library building, Penrose Library (1972) was constructed and the Daniels College of Business was moved from the downtown campus in 1966 to a new building in University Park. The general classroom building, Ben M. Cherrington Hall (1966) and a new Speech and Hearing Center were built as well. He broke ground for the Shwayder Art Building which was completed in 1979 after he had left the university. The Annual Publishing Institute was created during his time in office. He was a member of the U.S. Commission on Civil Rights from 1968 to 1974; Chairman of the Board, Federal Reserve Bank, Denver Branch; Member of the Board, African Student Aid Fund-Phelps Stokes Fund; Member of the Board, Colorado State Historical Society; Chairman, Colorado Savings Bond Committee; Member, Citizens Board, University of Chicago; Member, College Entrance Examination Board from 1971 to 1973, and a member of the Advisory Committee for the U.S. Army Command and General Staff College, Department of the Army. Some of the awards Maurice B. Mitchell received were: the George Washington Medal, Freedoms Foundation, in 1969. The Veterans of Foreign Wars Medal of Merit in 1970. The Certificate of Recognition for Distinguished Service to Education, Phi Delta Kappa, in 1971. The Golden Plate Award, American Academy of Achievement, in 1972. The Civis Princeps Award, Regis College, Denver, in 1973. The Meritorious Award, Denver Metropolitan National Association for the Advancement of Colored People, in 1973. The Malcolm Glenn Wyer Award, Adult Education Council, Metropolitan Denver, in 1975. The B'nai B'rith Award in 1976. Maurice Mitchell died in 1996 at the age of 81.
