= F.W. Olin Hall =

University of Denver building

Coordinates: 39.6741°N 104.9621°W

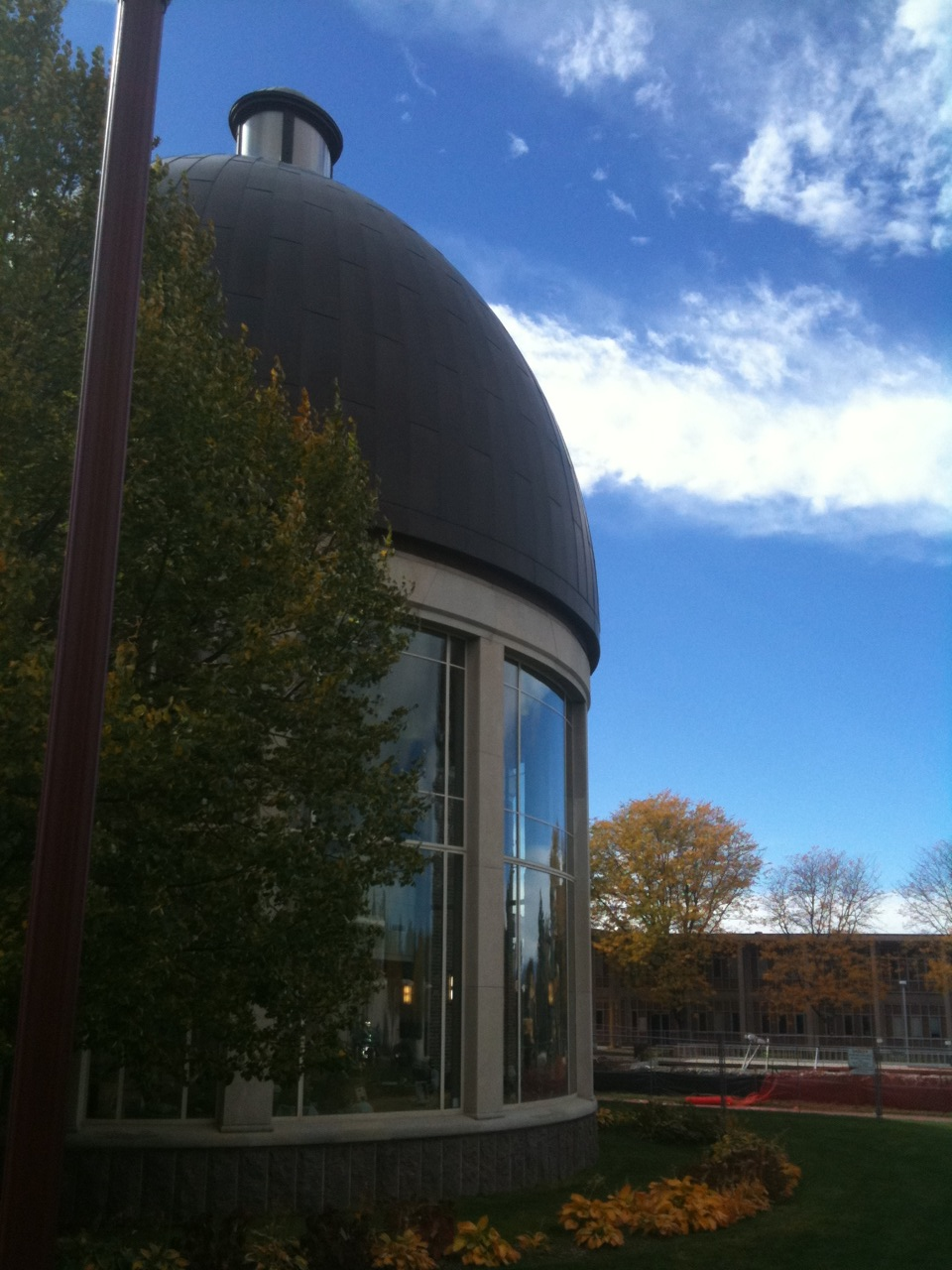
F.W. Olin Hall at University of Denver

F.W. Olin Hall is a building on the University of Denver campus. The predecessor to F.W. Olin Hall at the University of Denver was Science Hall. Science Hall was built in 1912 and the first building at the university to be completely dedicated to science. After 84 years of service, Science Hall was demolished in 1996 and replaced with F.W. Olin Hall.

F.W. Olin hall was built in 1997 because of an increased enrollment in chemistry and biology students. Science hall is not completely forgotten though, as the cornerstone is still housed in Olin Hall.

== Funding ==
The University of Denver lacked the resources to construct a new building, but Chancellor Daniel Ritchie found a way to raise the funds. The F.W. Olin foundation, in addition to smaller donations, provided the money to build F.W. Olin Hall.

=== The F.W. Olin Foundation ===
The majority of the money used to build and equip F.W. Olin Hall at University of Denver came from the F.W. Olin Foundation, which was established by Franklin W. Olin in 1938.

The organization has awarded 57 different schools 300 million dollars in grants to build 72 buildings. The buildings constructed with money from the foundation are not strictly science buildings. Some are business schools, libraries or arts and humanities buildings.

Other universities that have buildings as a result of the F.W. Olin Foundation are Johns Hopkins University, Colgate, Marquette, Tufts, and the University of San Diego, amongst many others.

In 2000, the board of the F.W. Olin Foundation began to phase out the organization. The F.W. Olin Foundation closed, and is no longer donating.

== Architecture ==
G. Cabell "Cab" Childress IV is responsible for designing numerous buildings on the University of Denver's Campus. Daniel Ritchie, who became DU's chancellor in 1989, named Childress the university architect in 1994, which he held until he retired in 1999. Childress was, however, consulting with the university as the school's architect emeritus until he died on November 17, 2006.

The American Institute of Architects awarded him Denver Architect of the Year and Colorado Architect of the Year in 2003.

Childress is most famous for conceptualizing the University of Denver's $450 million makeover, which is still going on today. His idea was inspired by the past in his attempt to connect the old with the new, or what some call the "Harvard of the West." Some say that this has created a classical, somewhat nostalgic aesthetic to Denver's campus.

The copper-domed structure that adorns F.W. Olin Hall set the tone for the designs of other buildings constructed on campus since its establishment in 1997. Robert Coombe, the university's chancellor today, oversaw the building's construction.

Due to chemical weathering, the coppered dome now appears to have a more brownish black color. When it rains or snows, carbonic acid is created due to the water's reaction with the carbon dioxide in the atmosphere.

This carbonic acid creates copper carbonate, which is responsible for the brown and black layer that has continued to cover the copper cupola for over thirteen years.

Childress is also responsible for the architectural design behind the Daniel L. Ritchie Center for Sports and Fitness, and the Newman Center for the Performing Arts.

== Notable professors ==
Ronald S. Nohr is a chemistry professor teaching in F.W. Olin Hall. Nohr has patents on numerous inventions. One is the method of cleaning melt-processing equipment with a thermoplastic polyolefin and a bifunctional siloxane.

Lawrence J. Berliner, chemistry professor at F.W. Olin Hall at University of Denver has been published seven times. Berliner earned his Ph.D. from Stanford University. One of his published studies, which was done at the University of Denver is called Conformation-dependent interaction of alpha-lactalbumin with model and biological membranes: a spin-label ESR study.

== Additional information ==
One of the many published studies done at F.W. Olin Hall at the University of Denver is called Energy and Environment & Wind Turbines, which studied the relationship between diurnal raptor acuity and wind turbine blade conspicuity. Apparently, wind turbines in the Altamont Pass in central California have killed a disproportionate number of raptors relative in comparison with other bird species. The study concluded that bird's vision was the most likely cause of the collisions.

Also, Second Life, an online virtual-reality game with an open-ended design that has been created by University of Denver faculty incorporates F.W. Olin Hall into the virtual world. Jeff Corbin, a part-time media specialist at the school, digitally designed the building in honor of his employer.
