= Daniel L. Ritchie =

American businessman (1931–2025)

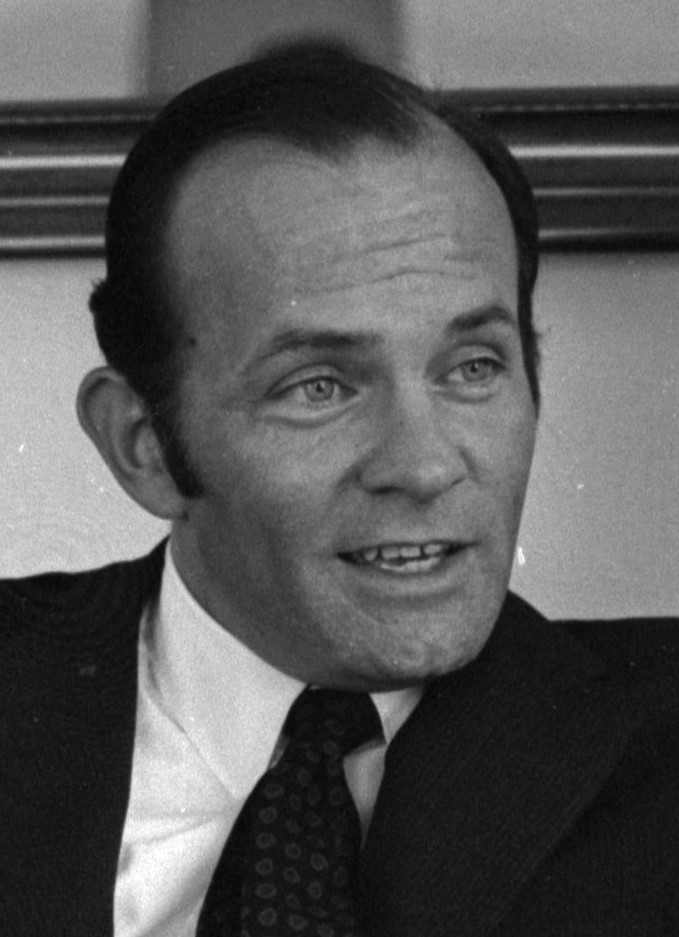
Ritchie in 1969

Daniel L. Ritchie (September 19, 1931 – January 30, 2025) was an American businessman who served as the Chancellor of the University of Denver and as a CEO of major communication corporations.

== Background ==
Ritchie was born on September 19, 1931, in China Grove. He attended Harvard University where he earned a bachelor's and master's degree in Business Administration from Harvard Business School. After graduating from Harvard, he briefly served in the Army and worked as a securities analyst in New York.

Ritchie died on January 30, 2025, at the age of 93.

== Career ==
=== Early career ===
Ritchie moved to Colorado to manage Columbia Savings and Loan in the 1960s. After his time with Columbia Savings and Loan, Ritchie relocated to Hollywood, where he became executive vice president of MCA Inc. He lived in Hollywood but later left the industry, stating dissatisfaction with certain business practices.

=== Westinghouse ===
Following his years in Hollywood, Ritchie became an entrepreneur in the organic foods industry and later served as CEO of Westinghouse Broadcasting for eight years. During Ritchie's tenure, Westinghouse Broadcasting broadcast a national report on the emerging AIDS crisis. According to Ritchie in a 2005 article, an affiliate station in San Francisco presented him with a report about a new disease that was alarming the medical community. He believed the story merited national attention due to its potential impact on public health. Ritchie and his team chose to preempt the corporation's prime-time lineup in favor of a report on the virus, a decision he felt might not align with the priorities of broadcasting leadership at the time.

After many years as the head of Westinghouse, Ritchie retired at age 55 to the Grand River Ranch near Kremmling, Colorado, where he intended to raise cattle and enjoy his ranch. He returned to Colorado after nearly 30 years in executive positions with MCA, Inc. and Westinghouse.

=== University of Denver ===
Ritchie became involved when the University of Denver faced financial strain due to a local economic downturn in the 1980s. In an interview, Ritchie recalled borrowing money to cover payroll, emphasizing the uncertain financial situation of the university at the time. He served as vice chairman of the board and chaired the development committee before becoming Chancellor.

=== Chancellor ===
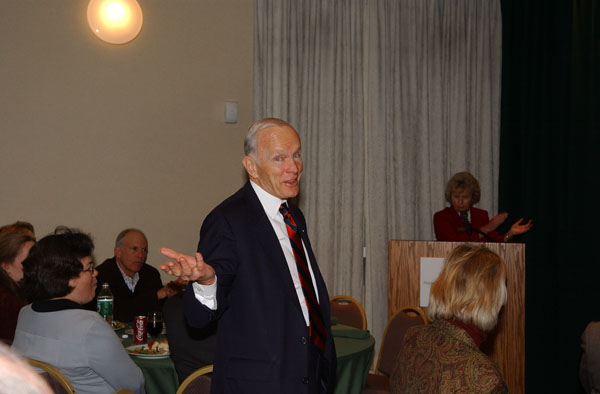
Daniel Ritchie, center, at National Park System Advisory Board meeting.

Daniel L. Ritchie was appointed the 16th chancellor of the University of Denver, succeeding Dwight Morrell Smith (January 1984 – July 1989). He was nicknamed the first "cowboy chancellor." During his tenure, the University emphasized the teaching of ethics, and Ritchie collaborated with Bill Daniels to incorporate ethics, values, and social responsibility into the business school curriculum. Shortly after becoming Chancellor, Ritchie appointed a task force to review international activities at the University. Based on that report, the University expanded and restructured its international programs. Study Abroad and International Human Rights Advocacy were given prominence in the University's strategic plan. The Cherrington Global Scholars initiative expanded study abroad opportunities for students, and the International Human Rights Advocacy Center was established. He served as Chancellor without pay and donated a substantial portion of his Grand River Ranch to the University, which has provided over $50 million in funding for University projects.

In June 1994, Ritchie announced a personal gift of $15 million to the University, to be realized through the sale of some of his ranch. In 2001, the University of Denver completed a fundraising campaign that exceeded its $200 million goal by nearly $74 million. During Ritchie's tenure, the university initiated a large-scale construction and renovation program. In 2005, the DU opened the new Center for Travel & Tourism.

Ritchie supported initiatives to enhance DU's cultural and event-hosting facilities and played a role in securing the Frozen Four tournament for Denver in 2008. He served as the Chancellor for 15 years from 1989 to 2005.

In 2000, the University completed the Daniel L. Ritchie Center, which houses the 17 Division 1 University of Denver varsity sports programs and the Coors Fitness Center.

The Ritchie Center includes:

- A 14,500-square-foot (1,350 m^{2}) work out area
- A squash court and two racquetball courts
- Seven personal training studios
- Six outdoor lighted tennis courts
- A two-story climbing wall
- An Olympic-size pool

=== Chairman of the Board: University of Denver ===
After serving as the Chancellor of the University for 15 years, Ritchie stepped down. He continued to be involved in the University by becoming chairman of the Board of Trustees from 2007 to 2009.

=== Denver Center for the Performing Arts ===
Ritchie had an interest in the performing arts and supported the building of the Newman Center for the Performing Arts on the University of Denver's campus. He increased his involvement with the Denver Center for Performing Arts in January 2007, becoming chairman and CEO, succeeding Donald R. Seawell, who founded The Denver Center in 1972.

=== Boards and organizations ===
In addition to serving as The Denver Center's chairman, Ritchie was president of the Temple Hoyne Buell Foundation, which focuses on early childhood education and development. He served on the Boards of the Daniels Fund, which supports programs that encourage personal responsibility and achievement by funding college scholarships and community programs, and the Denver Art Museum Foundation. He also served on the Executive Committee of Colorado Concern and was Chairman Emeritus and Honorary Member of the Board of the Central City Opera House Association. He was President of the Independent Higher Education of Colorado Fund. Ritchie also served as chair of the Education Committee of the National Park System Advisory Board. In 2010, Governor Bill Ritter appointed Daniel L. Ritchie as the new chairman of Colorado Concern.

== Awards ==
- Citizen of the West Award (1998)
- National Samaritan Institute Award
- Gold Medal Award of the Poor Richard Club
- Outstanding Philanthropist at National Philanthropy Day
- National Human Relations Award from the American Jewish Committee
- Community Cultural Enrichment Award from the Mizel Museum of Judaica
- Ethical Leadership Award from the University of Denver
- Laureate Member of the Colorado Business Hall of Fame
- Honorary Professor at Bundelkhand University, Jhansi, India (2000)
- Tourism Hall of Fame Inductee (2005)
- Ethical Leadership Award from the University of Denver

== See also ==
- University of Denver
- Robert Coombe
- Colorado
- Denver Boone
- Daniels College of Business
- Sturm College of Law
- Josef Korbel School of International Studies
- Denver Center for the Performing Arts
- Magness Arena
