= Maciej Kumosa =

Materials scientist and academic

Maciej S. Kumosa
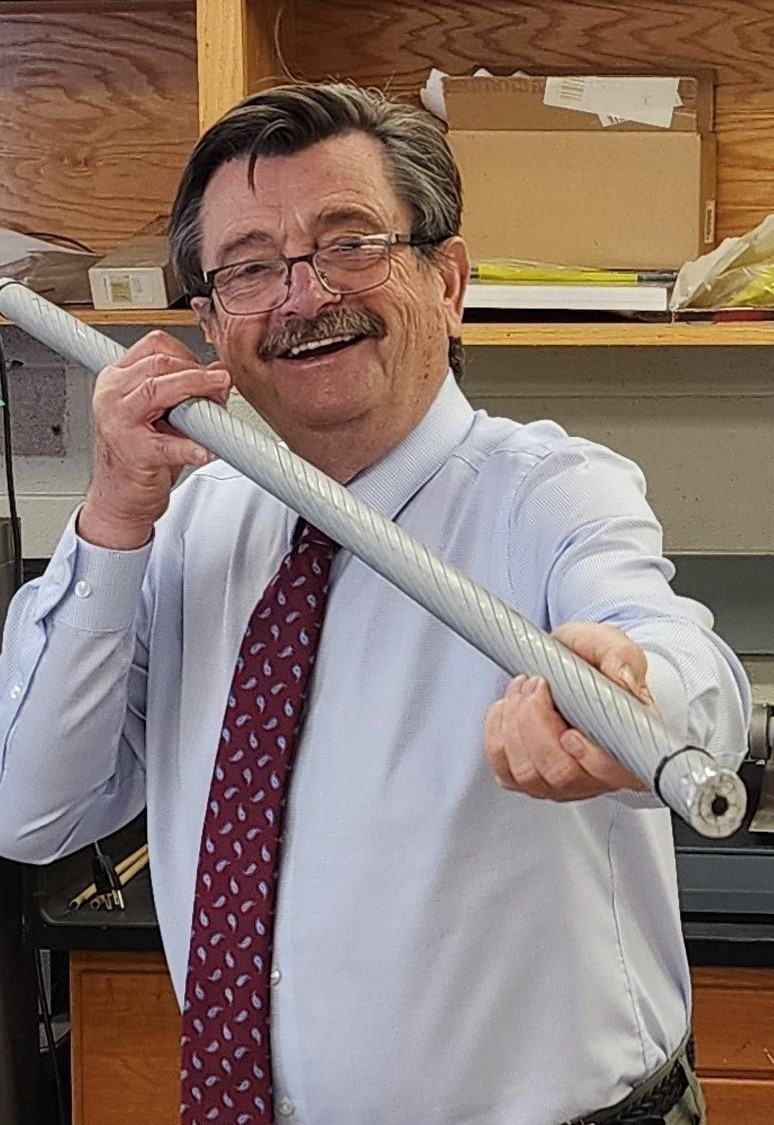
- Born: 1953 (age 72–73); Warsaw, Poland
- Occupations: Materials scientist and academic
- Known for: HVT Center and research on Extreme Materials and their Applications
- Title: John Evans Professor

Academic background
- Education: MS., Applied Mechanics and Materials Science; PhD., Applied Mechanics and Materials Science
- Alma mater: Wrocław University of Science and Technology
- Doctoral advisor: Leszek Golaski

Academic work
- Institutions: University of Denver; Center for Novel High Voltage/Temperature Materials and Structures (HVT)

Maciej S. Kumosa is a materials scientist and academic. He holds the title of John Evans Professor at the University of Denver, and is the director of the Center for Novel High Voltage/Temperature Materials and Structures (HVT).

Kumosa's research interests involve analyzing advanced materials at multiple scales, both experimentally and numerically, for applications in electrical, aerospace, and other fields under extreme operating conditions.

Kumosa serves as an Editorial Board Member for Composites Science and Technology, Structural Durability & Health Monitoring, and Fibers.

== Early life ==
Maciej Kumosa was born on July 13, 1953, in Warsaw, Poland, to a family with teaching, medicine, and farming backgrounds. His father, Dr. Stefan Kumosa, was a well-respected physician in Słupca, a small town in the middle of communist Poland with approximately 5,000 residents during that period. At age five, Kumosa was relocated from Warsaw to Slupca, where he received his elementary and high school education from primary school number 1 and Marshal Józef Piłsudski High School in 1968 and 1972, respectively.

== Education ==
Kumosa earned his Masters's degree in Applied Mechanics and Materials Science from the Technical University of Wroclaw, in 1978. He continued his studies at the same university, completing his Ph.D. in Applied Mechanics and Materials Science in 1982.

== Career ==
In 1981, Kumosa began his career as a senior research assistant in the Institute of Materials Science and Applied Mechanics at the Technical University of Wroclaw and was appointed as an assistant professor in 1983. He then served as a senior research associate at the University of Cambridge from 1984 to 1990, followed by an appointment as an associate professor in the Department of Materials Science and Engineering and Department of Electrical Engineering and Applied Physics at Oregon Graduate Institute (OGI) in Portland from 1990 until 1998. In 1996, he joined the University of Denver as a research professor in the Department of Engineering and was later promoted to the roles of associate professor and full professor. Since 2006, he has been serving as a John Evans Professor at the University of Denver (DU). He retired as an academic in 2024.

Kumosa was the chair of the Mechanical and Materials Engineering (MME) Department at DU from 2007 to 2009 and later served as the director of the Center for Nanoscale Science and Engineering from 2007 to 2012. Since 2014, he has been serving as the center director of the National Science Foundation Industry/University Cooperative Research Center for Novel High Voltage/Temperature Materials and Structures (the HVT Center). The first Phase of the HVT Center was completed on September 30, 2024. During its 10 years of operation, the Center graduated 42 PHD and 15 master's students and published 205 journal papers at its four academic sites.

== Research ==
Kumosa's research focused on advanced materials under extreme conditions for electrical and aerospace applications, using experimental and numerical methods to optimize performance. He has authored publications spanning the fields of composites, materials science, applied physics, applied mechanics, and general science, including IEEE journals, conference proceedings, engineering magazines, and national research reports.

Kumosa's research has been funded by federal and private sponsors, including the National Science Foundation, the Air Force Office of Scientific Research, the Department of Energy (Headquarters), NASA, the Bonneville Power Administration, and the Western Area Power Administration. His main private research sponsors have been the Lockheed Martin Corporation, the Electric Power Research Institute, Tri-State Generation and Transmission, the Alabama Power Company, and Pacific Gas & Electric.

=== Graduate research at Wroclaw University of Science and Technology ===
As part of his Ph.D. research, Kumosa investigated both numerically and experimentally the initiation of cracking by mechanical twins in silicon iron. He used an anisotropic Eshelby approach to predict the stresses required to initiate cracks by terminated mechanical twins and to determine the directions of shear deformations associated with mechanical twining.

Kumosa started experimenting with thin-walled Glass Reinforced Polymer (GRP) composite structures by subjecting them to internal pressure to determine the effects of multiaxial loads in the initiation of damage in the composites. His mentors at that time were Leszek Golaski and Waclaw Kasprzak.

=== Cambridge research ===
After his graduation and initial academic appointments in Poland, Kumosa pursued an academic journey abroad in 1984. After a year as a visiting research fellow at the University of Liverpool, he then moved in December 1984 to Cambridge, England, where he spent over six years in the Department of Materials Science and Metallurgy at the University of Cambridge. Collaborating with Derek Hull and his research group, he focused on material science research and in particular advanced composites investigations.

During his time at Cambridge, Kumosa conducted research that involved the application of Finite Element Methods (FEM) to predict failures in advanced composite structures under multiaxial loading conditions. His investigations extended to the examination of stress corrosion cracking (SCC) in Glass Reinforced Polymer (GRP) composites, along with the analysis of mixed-mode failure and fracture in both GRP and Carbon Fiber Reinforced (CFRP) composites. Moreover, he evaluated the potential use of Acoustic Emission (AE) for monitoring composite structures and contributed to research on the crashworthiness of composites.

Kumosa contributed to the development of the Iosipescu shear test, demonstrating its uniqueness through FEM including the consideration of axial splits and their impact on composite failure predictions. Collaborating with W. Broughton, he further redesigned the test to incorporate biaxial shear-dominated conditions, a seminal modification at that time. In addition, his FEM research supported multiaxial testing of filament-wound composite cylinders, accounting for the presence of hoop cracks in thin-walled composite tubes.

Kumosa, along with Sigalas and Hull, proposed the first numerical model of a composite tube subjected to axial crashing, resulting in a highly cited paper. Additionally, he demonstrated the precise counting of fractured fibers in the stress corrosion cracking of Glass Polymer Composites using AE monitoring.

In May 1990, Kumosa relocated to the Oregon Graduate Institute of Science and Technology (OGI) in Portland, Oregon. His SCC and shear testing of composites projects transitioned to OGI, forming the basis for two research programs: the study of biaxial failures in high-temperature polyimide composites and the investigation of in-service failures of High Voltage transmission composite insulators.

Kumosa's key graduate students at OGI who helped him build the foundation of his future NSF HVT Center were Kevin Searles, Qiong Qiu, Anurag Bansal and Jun Ding

=== High-temperature jet engine metals research ===
At OGI from 1990 to 1995, Kumosa, together with Korusiewicz and Ding, worked on the failure analysis and design of advanced metallic alloys, contributing to the GE90 project. Focused on jet engine applications, his research group focused on studying nickel-based superalloys and titanium aluminides used in the GE90 engine for their resistance to high-temperature fracture and fatigue.

=== High voltage transmission line insulators research ===
From 1992 to 2006, Kumosa supervised research on High Voltage (HV) composite insulators, also known as Non-Ceramic Insulators (NCIs). He directed initiatives addressing the challenges faced by these insulators used in transmission lines and substations globally. These insulators, subjected to intense mechanical, electrical, and environmental stresses, presented operational life challenges. One of his significant contributions has been to provide an explanation for various large HV transmission line insulator failures attributed to brittle fractures. Notably, he addressed the 14 energized line drops on the Western Area Power Administration's 345 kV Craig Bonanza line in Colorado and has elucidated the causes behind five catastrophic 500 kV line drops at Pacific Gas & Electric in California in 1995/1996 as well.

Working initially with his graduate students Bansal and Qiu at OGI and then at DU with Lucas Kumosa Jr, Tom Ely, Paul Predecki, Dwight Smith, and Daniel Armentrout, Kumosa made contributions by identifying the specific type of acid responsible for brittle fracture failures in California, Colorado, and other global regions. Moreover, he conducted simulations of brittle fractures in insulator (GRP) composites under high voltage conditions, shedding light on critical failure mechanisms.

Kumosa's work improved the understanding of insulator failure mechanisms and contributed to global advancements in High Voltage transmission system reliability. A notable development was the establishment of the first ranking system for commonly used GRP rod materials, evaluating their resistance to High Voltage brittle fracture and other in-service failures. He and his research teams also proposed the inaugural comprehensive model explaining insulator failures arising from improper crimping, which provided insights into failure modes.

=== High-temperature space combustion chamber composites research ===
From 1992 to 2004, Kumosa's High-Temperature Polymer Matrix Composite research aimed to understand fundamental failure mechanisms in High-Temperature (HT) composites. Using medium and high-stiffness carbon fibers with various HT polyimide resins, the research explored the impact of aging on composite strength properties, focusing on temperature variations and biaxial shear-dominated loading conditions. He advanced multidisciplinary technologies for affordable propulsion components, aiming for optimal performance and durability at elevated temperatures with reduced cooling needs.

In the course of this research, Kumosa, in collaboration with Benedikt and Predecki, developed experimental and numerical techniques to assess manufacturing stresses in propulsion engine components. These techniques, which are based on embedded aluminum inclusions, X-ray diffraction, and non-linear multiple inclusion Eshelby models, played a crucial role in predicting residual manufacturing stresses in High-Temperature Polymer Matrix Composites (HT PMCs) used in a composite combustion chamber with substantially reduced weight.

Additionally, Kumosa's collaborative efforts with Odegard, Rupnowski and Gentz led to the prediction of the failure properties of these composites under High-Temperature, multiaxial shear-dominated conditions. An unprecedented evaluation of the aging resistance of the composites in nitrogen (physical aging) and air (chemical aging) at temperatures as high as 400 °C was undertaken for the first time. The culmination of this research manifested in the optimization of High-Temperature (HT) combustion chamber composites, achieved through the meticulous selection and integration of fibers and matrices tailored to exhibit superior performance under high-temperature conditions.

=== Polymer core composite conductors research ===
Kumosa and his team of graduate students have directed their research toward High-Temperature High-Voltage Polymer Core Composite Conductors (PCCC) for use in High-Voltage (HV) transmission lines. Between 2008 and 2010, he and Burks were the first to determine the critical bend radius of the most popular HTLS PCCC. Additionally, from 2009 to 2012, they demonstrated the sensitivity of PCCC rods to transverse loading under aeolian vibrations. Their findings also suggested that bearing stresses due to crimping the conductor at a dead-end connection could be considered for effective fatigue life design. This effect was evaluated for the first time for PCCC rods at various stages of environmental aging, using a unique combined experimental/numerical approach.

Kumosa and Middleton conducted life predictions for PCCC conductors, indicating that exposure to high temperatures appeared to be more damaging to PCCC rods than the impact of highly concentrated ozone. Taking into account potential environmental conditions such as high temperature and ozone pollution, it was predicted that PCCC rods could endure in service for many years if the operating temperature did not exceed 120°C with an ozone concentration of no more than about 1%. Subsequently, he and Hoffman demonstrated that the in-service life of the conductors could be significantly extended (by 75%) through the application of special Teflon coatings on the rods.

Considering the prevalent issue faced by utilities using traditional steel/aluminum designs, especially in coastal environments, Kumosa, Håkansson, Hoffman and others conducted research to evaluate the resistance of the current PCCC design to corrosion on transmission lines. They proposed a potent analytical model of atmospheric galvanic corrosion of PCCC conductors, which was subsequently numerically and experimentally verified. He and his research teams have presented insights into the in-service performance of the next generation of High-Voltage High-Temperature Low Sag Polymer Core Composite Conductors, akin to their previous work on HV composite insulators. Their efforts have led to numerous potential improvements in design, as highlighted in various publications, including a feature in the Denver Business Journal, where he also discussed how the new transmission line product could save lives.

=== I/UCRC for novel high voltage materials and structures ===
Kumosa has led a research initiative funded by the National Science Foundation (NSF) and directed the HVT Center.

Kumosa's previous projects, including the PCCC conductor research, were integrated into the HVT Center, and new projects were initiated. Within the PCCC conductor project, his research performed in collaboration with Waters and Hoffman focused on the conductors' resilience to low-velocity excessive transverse impacts using unique fixtures and simulating impact behavior through Finite Element Method (FEM) analysis. The conductors exhibited superiority over their Al/steel counterparts in this regard.

The group also demonstrated the successful monitoring of PCCC conductors for various static and dynamic loads using Fiber Bragg Grating (FBG) sensors. These sensors proved effective in monitoring conductors during installation and in-service for both small and large deformations.

Among the new projects in the HVT Center, Kumosa studied the "Effect of Oxygen Aging on Ti/Al/V Powders used in Additive Manufacturing" with Billy Grell, Zach Loftus, and others. Along with Lu, Yi, Solis-Ramos and other researchers, he also investigated the "Synergistic Aging of Polymers and their Composites." The extreme aging of silicone rubbers used in HV voltage applications was another research conducted by him and Bleszynski in the Center, resulting in the design, manufacture, and testing of an HV silicone rubber with improved resistance to extreme aging by about 50%.

Henderson, Predecki, and Kumosa's project "Prevention of Ballistic Damage to HV Transformer Bushings" tested the use of ballistic polymer coatings on HV porcelain transformer bushings to protect them against high-power rifle damage, demonstrating for the first time that the bushings could be safeguarded against vandalism with properly designed and applied coatings. His collaborative project with Waters, Hoffman, and Predeck titled, "Polymerization in Single Fiber Composites using FBG Sensors" introduced a novel technique using FBG sensors within the HVT Center. This technique evaluated the responses of modeled polymer and metal composites to manufacturing conditions, using FBG sensors to identify the beginning and end of curing, the gel point, cooling strains, and stresses for polymers such as epoxies, and was later applied successfully to monitor the solidification of metals.

More recently in 2023, Kumosa's research teams studied both the "Modernization of Large Power Transformer (LPT) Tanks" and the "Development of Next-generation Graphene and Graphene Oxide Epoxy Base Nanocomposites". In the LPT project, he, Jide Williams, Hoffman, and Predecki demonstrated for the first time that heavy LPT tanks could be replaced with advanced PMCs for weight reduction, superior resistance to rifle damage, and improved performance in other adverse in-service conditions. In the Graphene Oxide Project, Matt Reil and others discovered a new powerful toughening mechanism in an epoxy resin with embedded graphene oxide nano-particles which was subsequently explained through extensive numerical and experimental simulations and verifications.

== Selected articles ==
- Broughton, W.R.; Kumosa, M.; Hull, D. (January 1990). "Analysis of the Iosipescu shear test as applied to unidirectional carbon-fibre reinforced composites". Composites Science and Technology. 38 (4): 299–325. doi:10.1016/0266-3538(90)90018-Z.
- Sigalas, I.; Kumosa, M.; Hull, D. (January 1991). "Trigger mechanisms in energy-absorbing glass cloth/epoxy tubes". Composites Science and Technology. 40 (3): 265–287. doi:10.1016/0266-3538(91)90085-4.
- Odegard, G.; Kumosa, M. (December 2000). "Determination of shear strength of unidirectional composite materials with the Iosipescu and 10° off-axis shear tests". Composites Science and Technology. 60 (16): 2917–2943. doi:10.1016/S0266-3538(00)00141-X.
- Kumosa, L.; Benedikt, B.; Armentrout, D.; Kumosa, M. (September 2004). "Moisture absorption properties of unidirectional glass/polymer composites used in composite (non-ceramic) insulators". Composites Part A: Applied Science and Manufacturing. 35 (9): 1049–1063. doi:10.1016/j.compositesa.2004.03.008.
- Kumosa, M.; Kumosa, L.; Armentrout, D. (May 2005). "Failure analyses of nonceramic insulators. Part 1: Brittle fracture characteristics". IEEE Electrical Insulation Magazine. 21 (3): 14–27. doi:10.1109/MEI.2005.1437604. S2CID 6258621.
- Lu, T.; Solis-Ramos, E.; Yi, Y.; Kumosa, M. (August 2018). "UV degradation model for polymers and polymer matrix composites". Polymer Degradation and Stability. 154: 203–210. doi:10.1016/j.polymdegradstab.2018.06.004.
- Waters, Daniel H.; Hoffman, Joseph; Kumosa, Maciej (February 2019). "Monitoring of Overhead Transmission Conductors Subjected to Static and Impact Loads Using Fiber Bragg Grating Sensors". IEEE Transactions on Instrumentation and Measurement. 68 (2): 595–605. Bibcode:2019ITIM...68..595W. doi:10.1109/TIM.2018.2851698.
- Williams, Jide; Hoffman, Joseph; Predecki, Paul; Kumosa, Maciej (October 2022). "Application of Polymer Matrix Composites in Large Power Transformer Tanks". IEEE Transactions on Power Delivery. 37 (5): 4190–4201. doi:10.1109/tpwrd.2022.3147410. S2CID 246539399.
- Reil, Matthew; Hoffman, Joseph; Predecki, Paul; Kumosa, Maciej (March 2024). "Intermolecular Interactions in Graphene and Graphene Oxide Nanocomposites". Composites Science and Technology. 248 (36). doi:10.1016/j.compscitech.2024.110433.
