= Robert Coombe =

America chemist

Robert Coombe is a chemist and an educator. He has been a faculty member at the University of Denver since 1981. From 2005 until 2014 he was chancellor.

== Education and work background ==
Robert Coombe was born in 1948 in Kansas City, Missouri, and lived in Colorado for the majority of his life. He grew up in Denver and attended local public schools. He graduated in 1970 from Williams College, and in 1973 with a Ph.D. in chemistry from the University of California, Berkeley. Coombe then was a postdoctorate at the University of Toronto, and later worked at Rockwell International in California for seven years as a researcher.

In 1981, Coombe returned to Colorado and began his career in chemistry at the University of Denver. He became assistant dean of graduate studies from 1985 to 1987. He served as a chair in the department of chemistry and biochemistry from 1988 to 1995. He was dean of the division of natural sciences, mathematics, and engineering from 1995 to 2001. In 2001, Coombe was named the provost, a position he held until July 1, 2005, when he was named the 17th chancellor of DU, taking over for Daniel L. Ritchie, who had the chancellorship since 1989.

== DU decisions, 2005-present ==
Due to the economic crisis, Coombe implemented a hiring freeze in October 2008. He halted the search for new faculty and staff because the campus was at or near capacity and was quoted as saying that he wanted administration to "rethink the centralized operating model and make appropriate modifications" due to the current economic situation. Over 111 staff members applied for voluntary severance as a result, receiving a lump-sum payment equal to six months' salary by willingly leaving. The hiring freeze has since been lifted. However, during this time tuition rates continued to be raised by the university.

In October 2008 in an email to DU students and alumni, Coombe defended the administration's decision to retire the mascot Boone back in 1998 after students had tried to bring the mascot back. Coombe said in the email that Boone "does not reflect the broad diversity of the DU community" but recognized that "we are certainly an institution that honors its past. Hence it seems reasonable that students and alumni be allowed to use the image as a celebration of that past, to the extent that they may choose".

On May 29, 2009, Coombe announced a smoking ban that would ban smoking in all university buildings, and within 25 feet of entrances and exits buildings on campus. The ban was based on a recommendation by DU's Tobacco Task Force headed by Sam Alexander, the executive director of University Health Services. The smoking ban was implemented on January 1, 2010, officially banning smoking on and around all areas of campus.

== Personal life and other activities ==
Coombe has two children. He is married to Dr. Julanna Gilbert, a professor in Denver's chemistry department. Coombe also holds other roles in the community. These include member of the Higher Education Working Group of the Council on Foreign Relations, on the Committee of Accountability of the Board of the National Association of Independent Colleges and Universities, member of the Rocky Mountain Regional Advisory Board of the Institute for International Education, and trustee of the Colorado Symphony Orchestra.

== See also ==
- Private university
