= Denver Boone =

Mascot of the University of Denver

Denver Boone was the official mascot of the University of Denver (DU) from 1968 to 1998. He was designed by a Walt Disney Company artist and named by a DU student. Having been retired and replaced by the DU administration in 1998, he was revived by DU students and alumni in 2009 and appeared at campus events as an unofficial mascot until 2018 until the character was banned from the DU Campus as part of a selectively-enforced university mask ban. After 2018, Denver Boone still appears at selected off-campus sporting, cultural and charity events in Denver and around the nation.

== Original Denver Boone ==
The original Denver Boone. He is said to inhabit "Boonetown"

1968 Clarion article announcing the naming contest for the "Pioneer".

In 1968, DU wished to update the previous mascot, Pioneer Pete, who served DU from the 1930s to the late 1960s. The DU Basketball coach Stan Albeck contacted an artist at Walt Disney Studio through a DU contact. Disney Studios drew up designs for DU, an updated, softer cartoon version of a previous DU mascot named Pioneer Pete, which Disney named "Pioneer", and passed to the DU Theatre Department, which developed the first costume. His brand appearance is a beard coonskin hat, like what a frontiersman would wear.

DU's Special Events Committee held a contest in the fall of 1968 to find a nickname for the new Pioneer. The contest was announced on the Clarion on October 2, 1968. DU undergraduate Steve Kiley won the contest with the suggestion "Denver Boone". DU student Doug Hirsh became the first of many people to play Denver Boone. Boone appeared on many of DU's sports uniforms and many editions of the Clarion, as well as making appearances at May Days, Winter Carnival, and other DU events.

Boone was nearly replaced during the 1983–84 school year as the student body was calling for a more masculine prototype. However, few alternative mascots were developed, and efforts to replace Boone, including a contest sponsored by the Clarion, were unsuccessful. In 1985-86, a poll among students found that a large majority of students approved of Boone. Pete Castro became the next person to play Boone.

Boone continued to serve until the late 1990s as the institution's official mascot.

== Retirement ==
In 1998, the Department of Athletics and Recreation began an effort to return all of DU's athletic teams to Division-I competition, along with the opening of a new $75 million athletic facility. As part of an effort to rebrand DU's athletic image, the administration at that time saw an opportunity to replace Denver Boone. As well as the mascot's association with the NCAA Division II era of Denver sports, Boone was seen as not representative of Denver's emerging female athletes, and Native Americans on campus had expressed concerns that Boone was a representative of the western extinction of Native American culture. In this context, the University retained the Pioneer nickname, but created a red-tailed hawk mascot and logo to replace Boone, saying that "red-tailed hawks were present when the Pioneers settled Colorado". Public reaction was lukewarm; several costumed versions of the Red Tailed Hawk (now named "Ruckus") were created, but few made the connection to the Pioneers.

== Unofficial return ==
By 2006, a campaign had started to bring back Denver Boone. In 2008, a survey found that 87% of the DU community supported reviving the character. Nonetheless, on October 20, 2008, Chancellor Robert Coombe rejected the proposal in an email to students, saying that Boone "does not reflect the broad diversity of the DU community". The issue was covered by the Denver Post, NBC affiliate KUSA, and ABC affiliate KMGH. Editorials by Valerie Richardson in The Washington Times and Mike Rosen in the Rocky Mountain News were highly critical of the administration.

By this point, DU had effectively retired Ruckus, and in November 2008, the university announced its intention to choose a new mascot, though the debate over Denver Boone continued. In a letter to students and alumni on the matter, Chancellor Coombe acknowledged that "Boone is a part of our history, one that is treasured by many alumni and friends as a symbol of the University they knew three and four decades ago". He added that "we are certainly an institution that honors its past. Hence it seems reasonable that students and alumni be allowed to use the image as a celebration of that past, to the extent that they may choose".

Therefore, in early January 2009, a group of alumni suggested resurrecting Denver Boone themselves as an unofficial mascot. Several mascot companies were contacted for designs and costings, and a grassroots effort organized via the LetsGoDU blog raised thousands of dollars for the initiative.

Alumni appealed for essay applications for candidates to portray the mascot, and DU student Scott Fuson was selected, and sent to Raymond Entertainment Group's Mascot Boot Camp, a trip fully funded by DU alumni donors. The alumni also stated that the new mascot should be committed to promoting diversity and partnering with a broad array of student groups, and the university administration reciprocated by allowing the mascot to appear on campus and at events.

The new Boone mascot was designed with an "ethnically ambiguous" skin tone and four fingers on each hand, to indicate that he should be perceived as character and not a living human being. Boone was officially unveiled by students and alumni at the Lincoln Memorial in Washington, D.C., as part of the 2009 NCAA Frozen Four celebrations.

As of 2022, the unofficial Boone mascot has appeared at many DU athletic events and campus functions and in some promotional videos. The character has also appeared at DU athletic events in Boston, Minneapolis, Madison, Baltimore, Annapolis, Philadelphia, Las Vegas, Milwaukee, Chicago, Providence, Buffalo, Tampa, Houston, College Station Newark, Delaware, St. Paul, Minnesota, Phoenix and Washington, D.C., on alumni-funded trips.

On February 27, 2013, the Undergraduate Student Government passed a bill barring student organizations from Undergraduate Student Government funding for items featuring the Boone image, as the university prepared to adopt a new mascot selected by a student-led task force. However, the bill's opponents claimed that the Undergraduate Student Government was acting on their behalf without their knowledge or permission.

In 2013, DU tried to create a new mascot to replace Denver Boone with a 76-member committee, but the DU board of trustees had to stop the process when 8,000+ voters were effectively split on the three underwhelming options offered.

In 2018, the unofficial Boone mascot costume was banned from DU campus under a "no mask" policy, enacted by the DU Board of Trustees as "protection from terrorism." However, the mask ban was called into question when the DU Director of Campus Security told the Denver Post that school mascots from other schools would be allowed on campus, while the chancellor's office confirmed that DU would not allow the Boone costume, even if the person wearing it was vetted by DU security prior to the event.
