= University of Denver =

Private university in Denver, Colorado, US

Coordinates: 39°40′42″N 104°57′44″W

- Former name: Colorado Seminary (1864–1880)
- Motto: Pro Scientia et Religione (Latin)
- Motto in English: "For Knowledge and Spirit"
- Type: Private research university
- Established: 1864; 162 years ago
- Religious affiliation: Nonsectarian; founded by Methodists
- Academic affiliations: CUMU; IAMSCU; NAICU; Space-grant
- Endowment: $1.15 billion (2025)
- Chancellor: Jeremy Haefner
- Provost: Elizabeth Loboa
- Students: 12,813 (fall 2024)
- Undergraduates: 6,613 (fall 2024)
- Postgraduates: 6,200 (fall 2024)
- Location: Denver, Colorado, United States
- Campus: 125 acres; Urban/residential, 125 acres (51 ha)
- Newspaper: The DU Clarion
- Colors: Crimson and gold
- Nickname: Pioneers
- Sporting affiliations: NCAA Division I – The Summit; NCHC (Men's Hockey)
- Website: du.edu

The University of Denver (DU) is a private research university in Denver, Colorado, United States. Founded in 1864, it had an enrollment of approximately 6,600 undergraduate students and 6,200 graduate students in 2024. It is classified among "R1: Doctoral Universities – Very high research spending and doctorate production". The 125-acre (0.51 km^{2}) main campus is a designated arboretum and is located five miles (8 km) south of downtown Denver.

== History ==
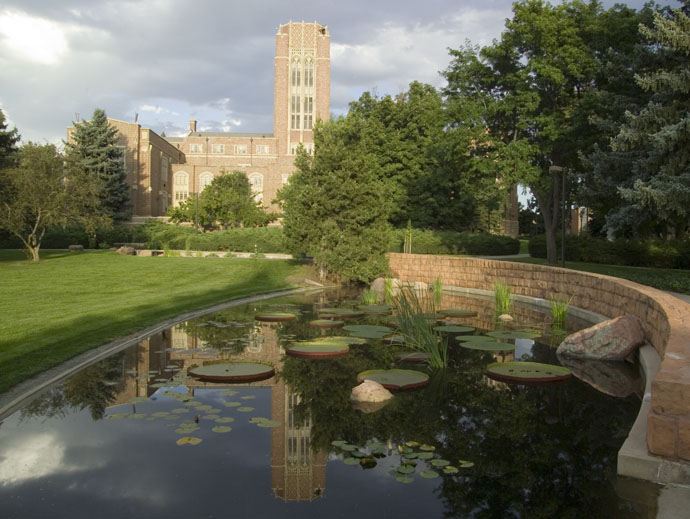
Mary Reed Hall and Harper Humanities Garden

In March 1864, John Evans, former governor of the Colorado Territory, appointee of President Abraham Lincoln, founded the Colorado Seminary in the newly created (1858) city of Denver, which was then a mining camp. Evans, governor and superintendent of Indian affairs of the Colorado Territory, lost his government position as a result of the November 1864 Sand Creek massacre (which was carried out by Colonel John Chivington, later a member of the Colorado Seminary's Trustees).

At its founding the seminary was non-sectarian and operated by the Methodist Episcopal Church. It struggled in the early years of its existence. In 1880, it was renamed the University of Denver. The first buildings of the university were located in downtown Denver in the 1860s and 1870s, but concerns that Denver's rough-and-tumble frontier town atmosphere was not conducive to education prompted a relocation to the current campus, built on the donated land of potato farmer Rufus Clark, some six miles (11 km) south of the downtown core. The university grew and prospered alongside the city's growth, appealing primarily to a regional student body prior to World War II. After the war, the large surge in G.I. Bill students pushed DU's enrollment to over 13,000 students, the largest the university has ever been, and helped to spread the university's reputation to a national audience.

== Campus ==
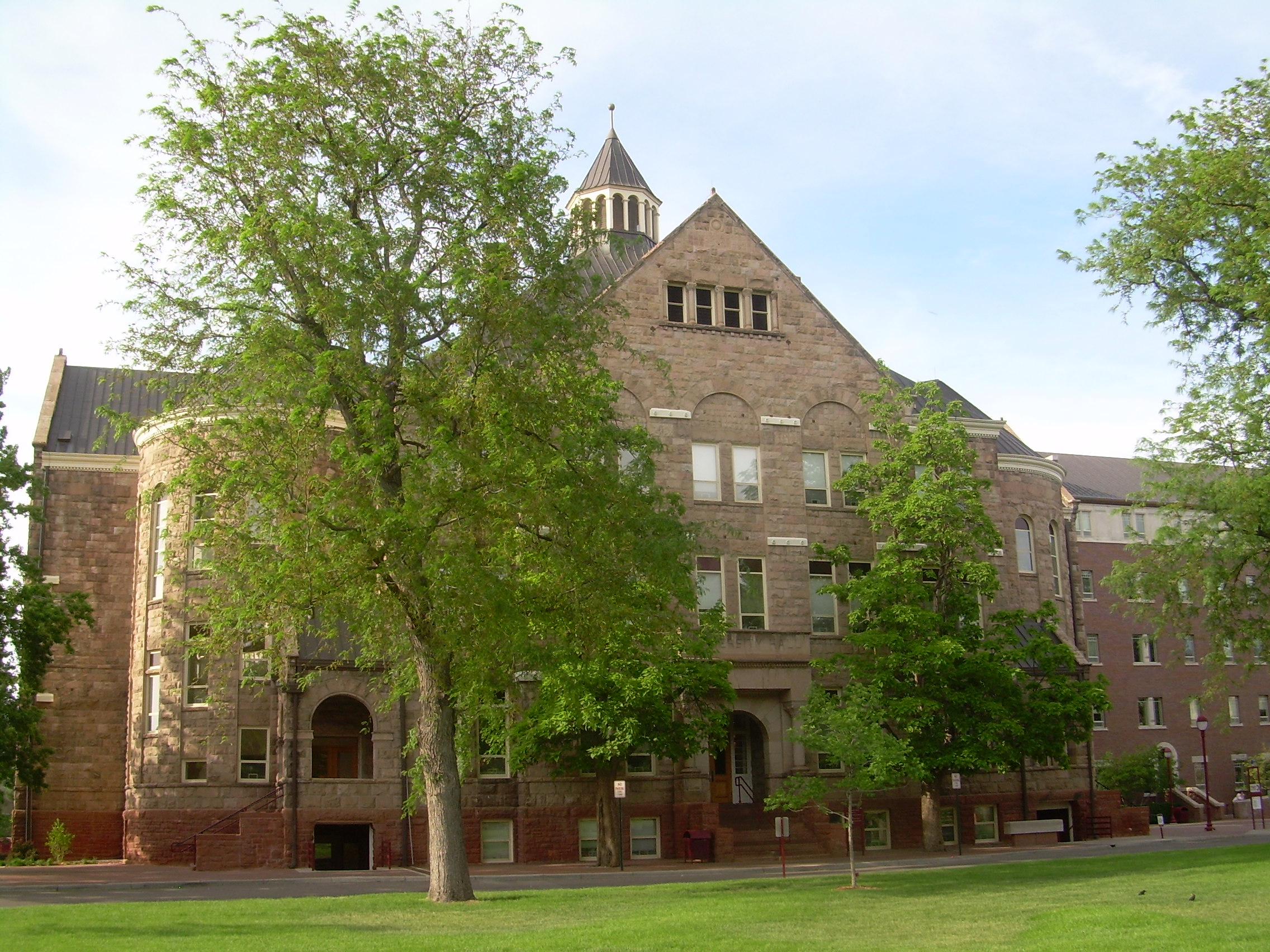
University Hall, built in 1890

The heart of the campus has a number of historic buildings. The longest-standing building is University Hall, which has served DU since 1890, and was built in the Richardsonian Romanesque style. Just a few blocks off campus sits the historic Chamberlin Observatory, opened in 1894. Still a fully operational observatory, it is open to the public twice a week as well as one Saturday a month.

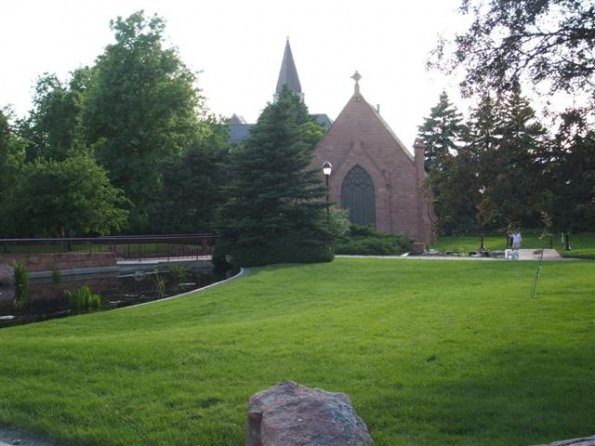
Evans Memorial Chapel; built in the late 1870s by John Evans in memory of his daughter Josephine Evans Elbert

The central campus area also includes Evans Memorial Chapel, an 1870s-vintage small church which was once located in downtown Denver, and was relocated to the DU campus in the early 1960s. Buchtel Tower (1913) is all that remains of the former Buchtel Chapel, which burned in 1983.

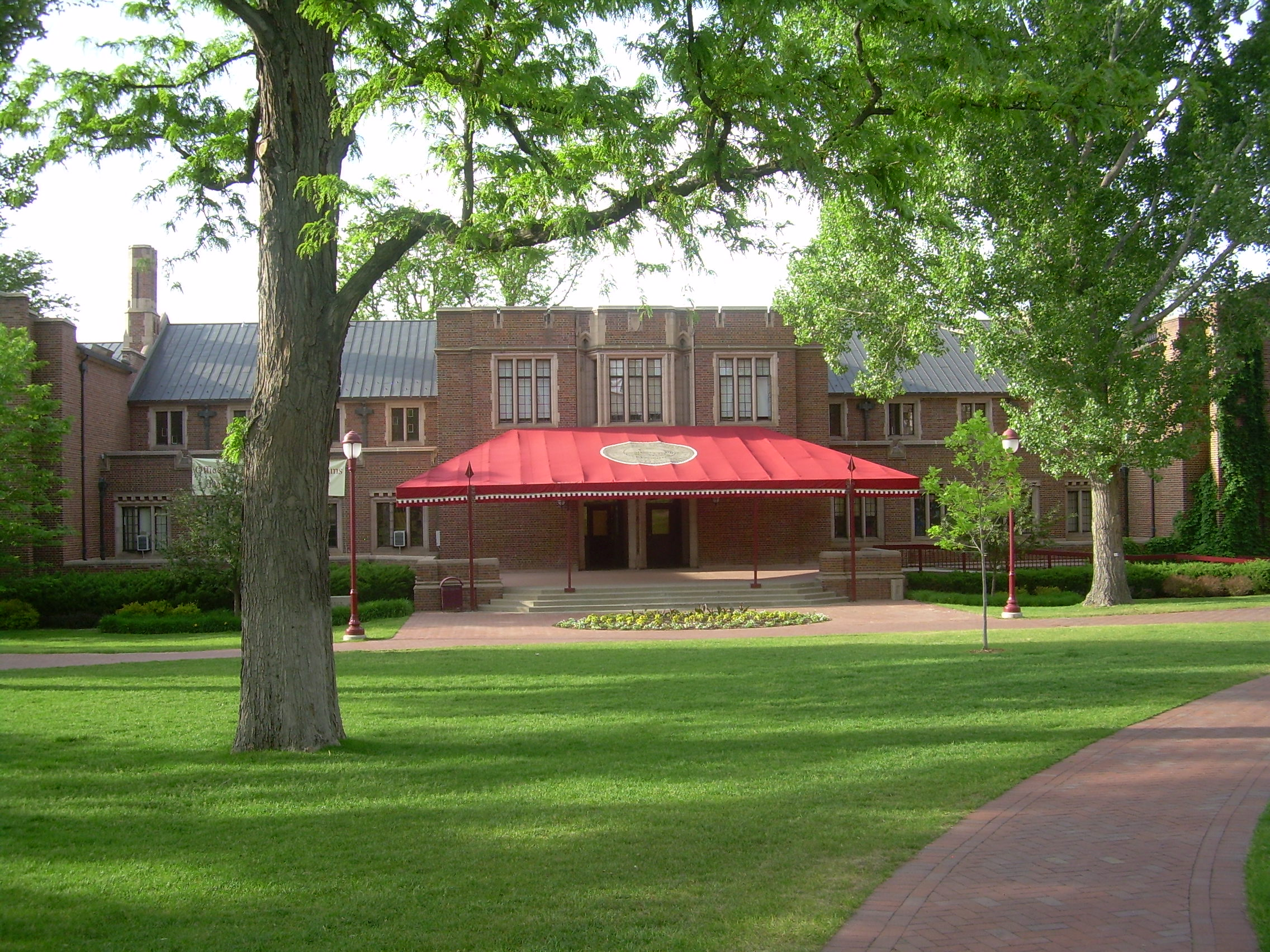
Margery Reed Hall

The administrative offices are located in the Mary Reed Building, a former library built in 1932 in the Collegiate Gothic style. Margery Reed Hall (named for the daughter of Mary Reed) was also built in the collegiate gothic style in 1929. Margery Reed Hall houses the Undergraduate Program for the Daniels College of Business; an $8 million overhaul and renovation was completed early 2014. The building was updated to include more classroom space, a larger hall to host guest speakers, as well as mechanical and technical improvements.

F.W. Olin Hall opened in 1997, housing Biological and Natural Sciences. The 40,000 square foot structure was the first building on campus constructed to meet a new set of design and aesthetic standards emphasizing load-bearing masonry, organic designs, and timeless architectural features. Olin Hall includes a two-story rotunda topped with an elliptical copper dome, a sentinel in the university skyline.

The Daniels College of Business was completed in September 1999 at the cost of $25 million. The business school has been nationally recognized by organizations such as Forbes magazine, Business Week, and the Wall Street Journal where it is ranked second in the nation for producing students with high ethical standards.

In 2002, the university opened the $70 million Robert and Judi Newman Center for Performing Arts, which houses the acclaimed Lamont School of Music. The center includes the June Swaner Gates Concert Hall, a four-level opera house seating just under 1,000, the Frederic C. Hamilton Family Recital Hall, a 222-seat recital hall with the largest (2,850 pipes) "tracker" organ in the region, and the Elizabeth Ericksen Byron Theatre, a flexible theatre space seating up to 350. The Newman Center serves as home to many professional performing arts groups from the Denver region as well as the university's Newman Center Presents multi-disciplinary performing arts series.

Nelson Hall, opened in 2002, is a LEED residence hall housing sophomores in dorm- and apartment-style suites. Its castle-like design and gold leaf-topped tower anchors the south end of campus.

In autumn 2003, DU opened a new $63.5 million facility for its College of Law, later named the "Sturm College of Law." Donald and Susan Sturm, owners of Denver-based American National Bank, had given $20 million to the University of Denver College of Law. The gift is the largest single donation in the 112-year history of the law school and among the largest gifts ever to the university. The building includes a three-story library.

In 2005 the Graduate School of Social Work completed the renovation and significant expansion of its building, renamed Craig Hall. The building features extensive stained glass artwork and a large events space.

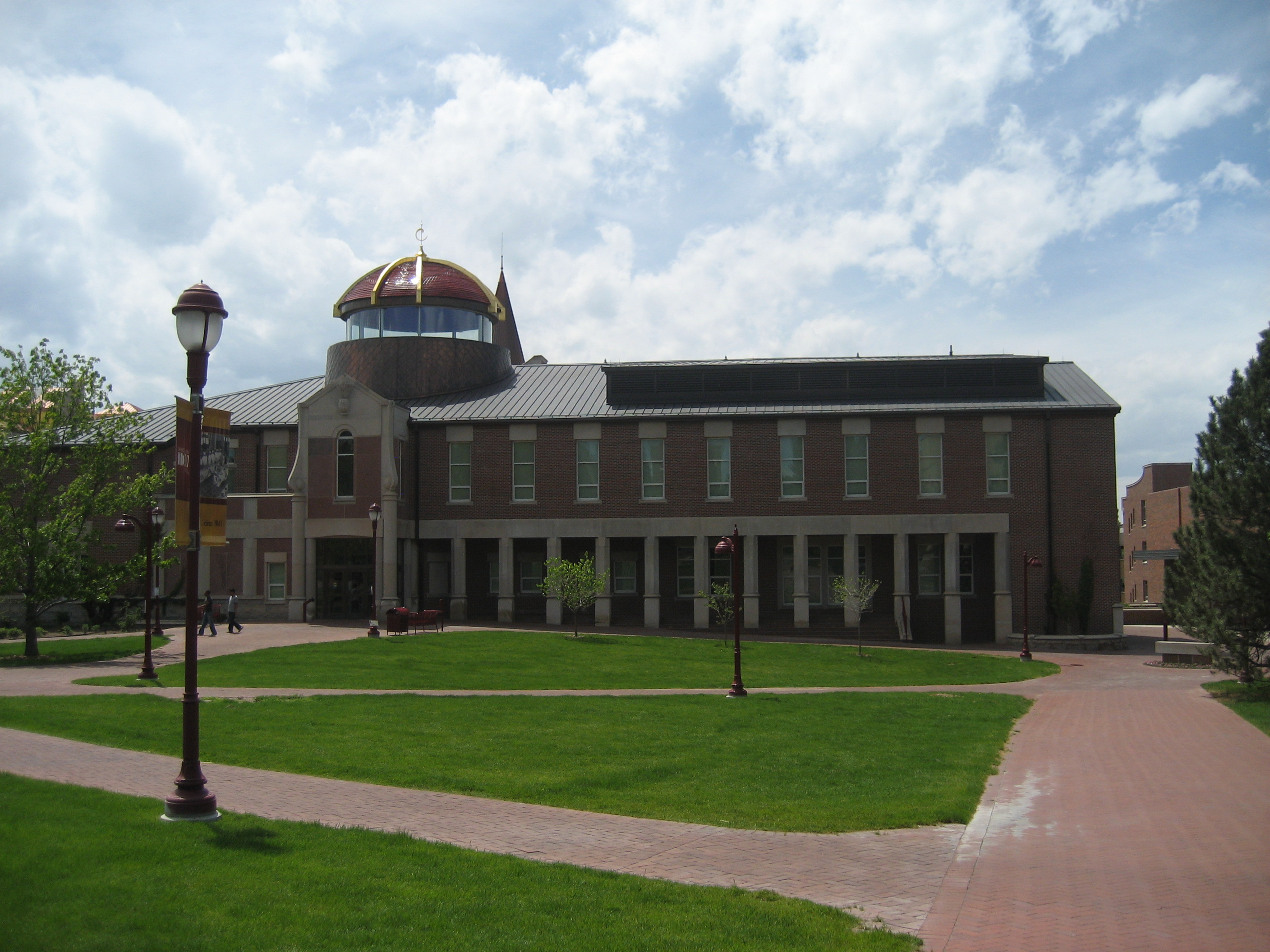
Fritz Knoebel School of Hospitality Management

In January 2006, DU opened a new building for the School of Hotel, Restaurant, and Tourism Management (Fritz Knoebel School of Hospitality Management), later named the Joy Burns Center. The building contains classrooms, a large wine cellar, meeting rooms, and an all-purpose dining room that hosts numerous city and university events, weddings, and formal parties. The school helps DU rank near the top of all hotel schools in the United States. The program had its first graduating class in 1946.

Nagel Hall, a five-story 150,000 square foot residence hall, whose distinguishing characteristic is a tower topped by a 12-ton copper-clad cone, was completed in the Fall of 2008 to accommodate sophomores and upperclassman. The project was partially funded by a 30-year $45.7 million revenue bond and a $4 million donation from DU Trustee Ralph Nagel and his wife Trish. Nagel Hall also houses works donated from the Nagels' art collection, with over 50 paintings from Colorado artists including many by Ralph Nagel himself. In 2012, the building was certified Gold in LEED standards in recognition of its environmentally friendly and sustainable design. The building also houses offices for the Department of Psychology and a bike repair shop in its lower level.

DU completed the first ever (Peter S. Barton) lacrosse-only stadium that was specifically designed for the sport in 2005, as well as the Ciber Field Soccer Stadium (2010) on the northern end of campus, adjoining the Nagel studio space for the School of Art, as well as the Pat Bowlen varsity sports weight training facility underneath the stands.

At the beginning of the summer of 2011, the 41-year-old Penrose Library closed for a $32 million renovation, and reopened in the spring of 2013 as the Anderson Academic Commons, a 21st-century high-tech collaboration and study space.

In May 2016, the 47,000 square foot Anna & John J. Sie International Relations Complex opened as an addition to Cherrington Hall. The addition rises five stories, and includes classrooms, offices, and an expansive event space and deck on the fifth floor. The building also features a blue-tiled tower prominent in the university's skyline.

In 2016, the university opened the 130,000 square foot Daniel Felix Ritchie School of Engineering and Computer Science on the southern end of campus, adjacent to Olin Hall. The building features classroom, laboratory, and office spaces for faculty, as well as a cafe on the first floor. The structure is notable for its zinc and limestone dome rising five floors above the main entrance.

In September 2020, the Dimond Family Residential Village opened to house first-year students, and the Burwell Center for Career Achievement opened to house alumni engagement and career services offices, replacing the Leo Block Alumni Center. Both are on track to achieve LEED certification and are the first structures completed under the Denver Advantage Campus Framework Plan.

In October 2021, the establishment of the James C. Kennedy Mountain Campus was announced with a $26 million gift from a university alumnus.

== Academics ==
=== Rankings ===
Academic rankings

National
- Forbes: 140
- U.S. News & World Report: 105
- Washington Monthly: 228
- WSJ/College Pulse: 131

Global
- ARWU: 901–1000
- QS: 651–700
- THE: 351–400
- U.S. News & World Report: 727

USNWR graduate school rankings
Business	68
Education	83
Engineering	173
Law	80

USNWR departmental rankings
Clinical Psychology	50
English	99
Fine Arts	124
Library & Information Studies	35
Psychology	97
Social Work	11

The undergraduate business program, The Daniels College of Business, was ranked 87th best in 2016 by BusinessWeek.

Education journalist Jeff Selingo named the University of Denver a "dream school" in his 2025 book, Dream School: Finding a College That's Right for You (Scribner).

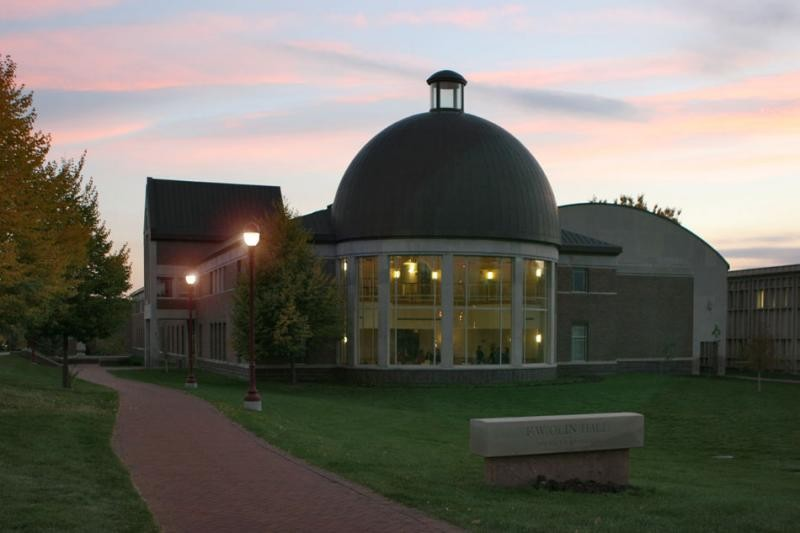
F W Olin Hall for Biological and Natural Sciences

=== Academic programs ===
Schools and colleges:

- College of Arts, Humanities & Social Sciences
- College of Natural Sciences & Mathematics
- Daniels College of Business
- Sturm College of Law
- University College
- Morgridge College of Education

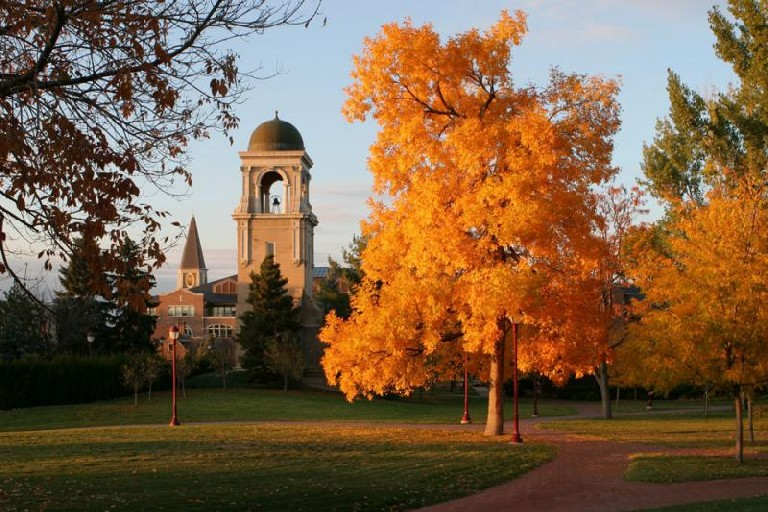
Buchtel Tower and the Sturm College of Law Tower

- Graduate School of Professional Psychology
- Graduate School of Social Work
- Josef Korbel School of International Studies
- Lamont School of Music
- Daniel Felix Ritchie School of Engineering and Computer Science

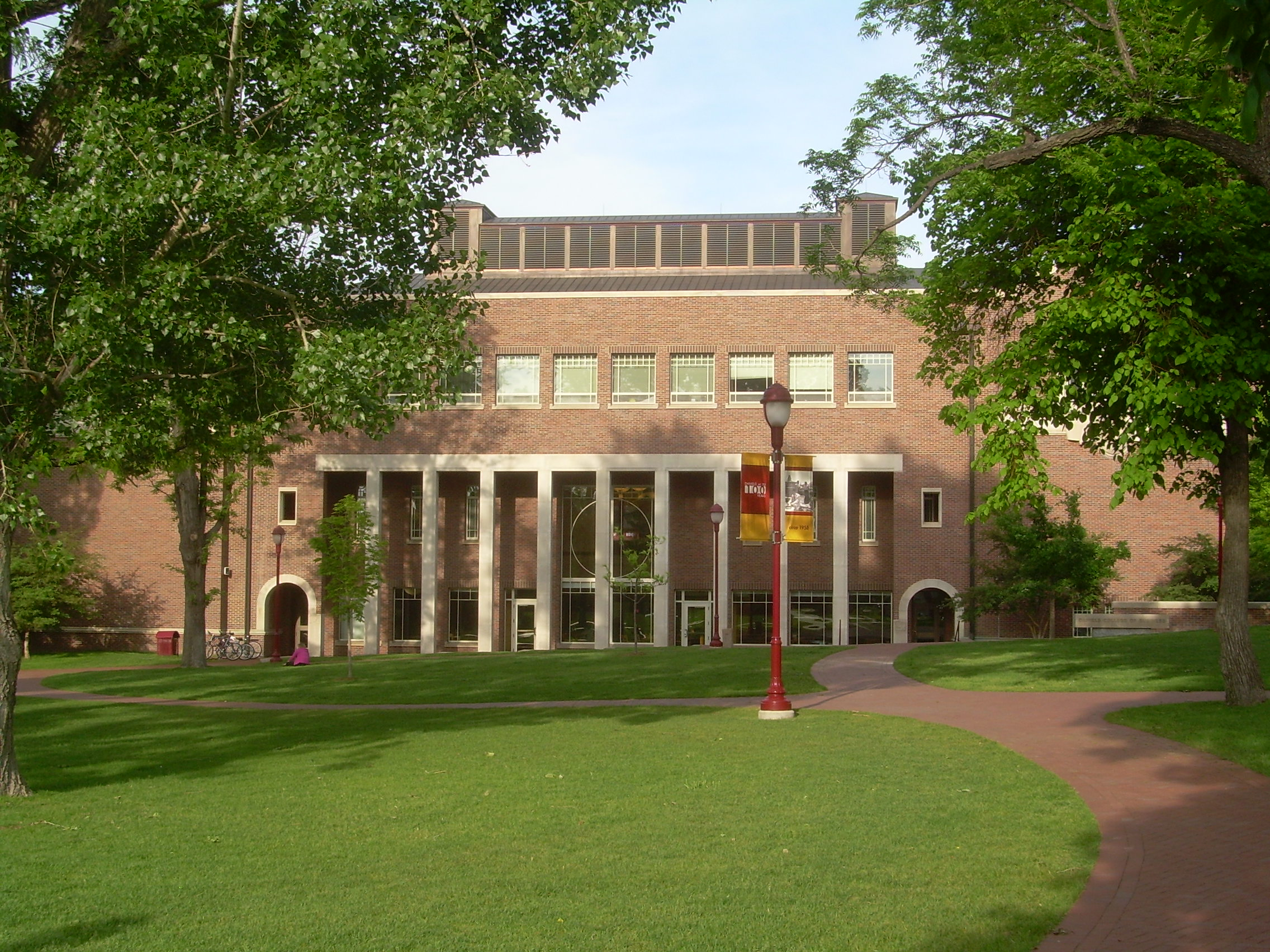
Daniels College of Business; the eighth oldest business school in the country

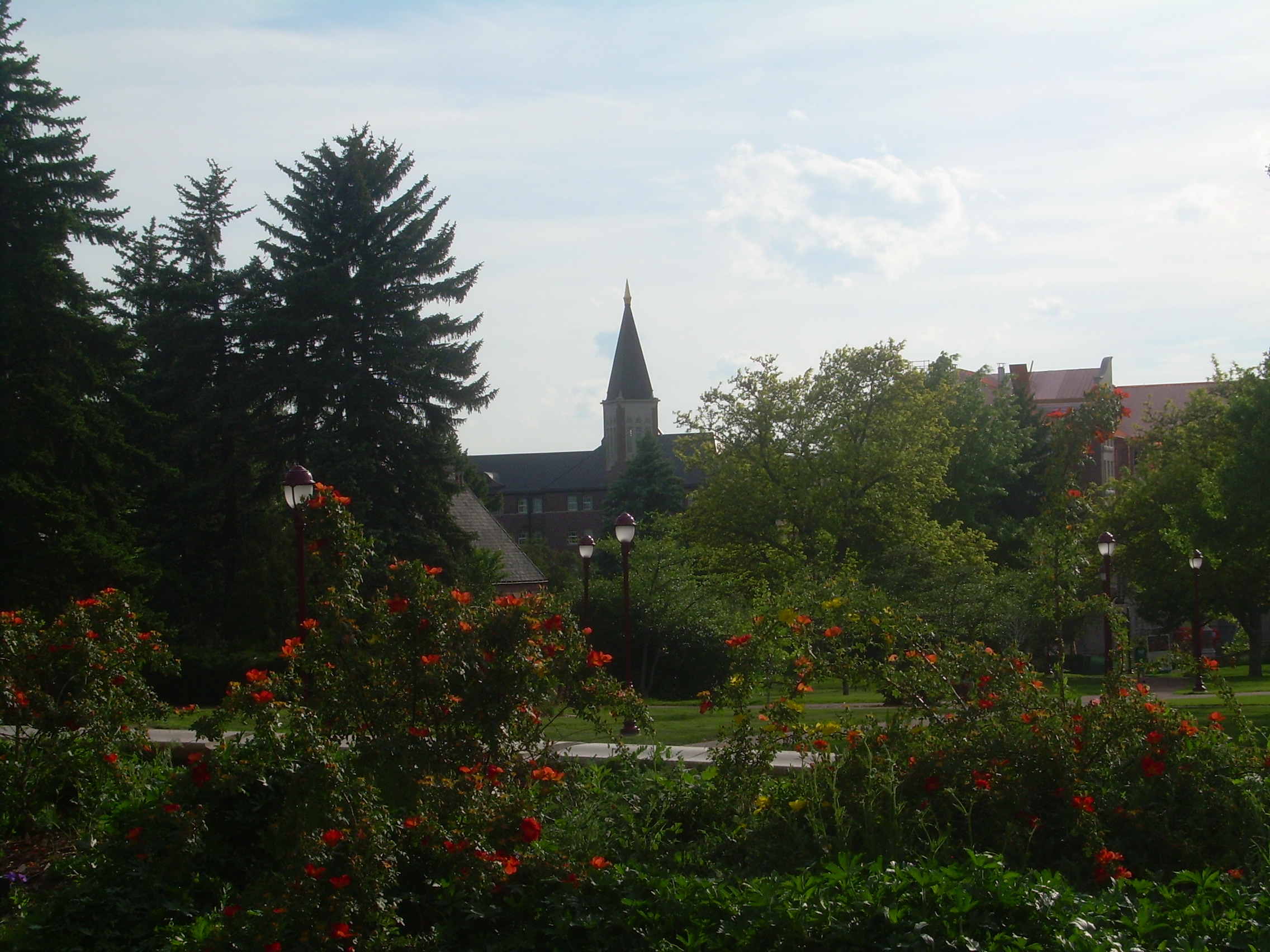
Nelson Hall Tower

Offering students a learning experience abroad, the Cherrington Global Scholars program offers every undergraduate the chance to study abroad at no cost above the normal university tuition, room and board.

As of 2017, the Daniels School of Business also offers an online MBA program.

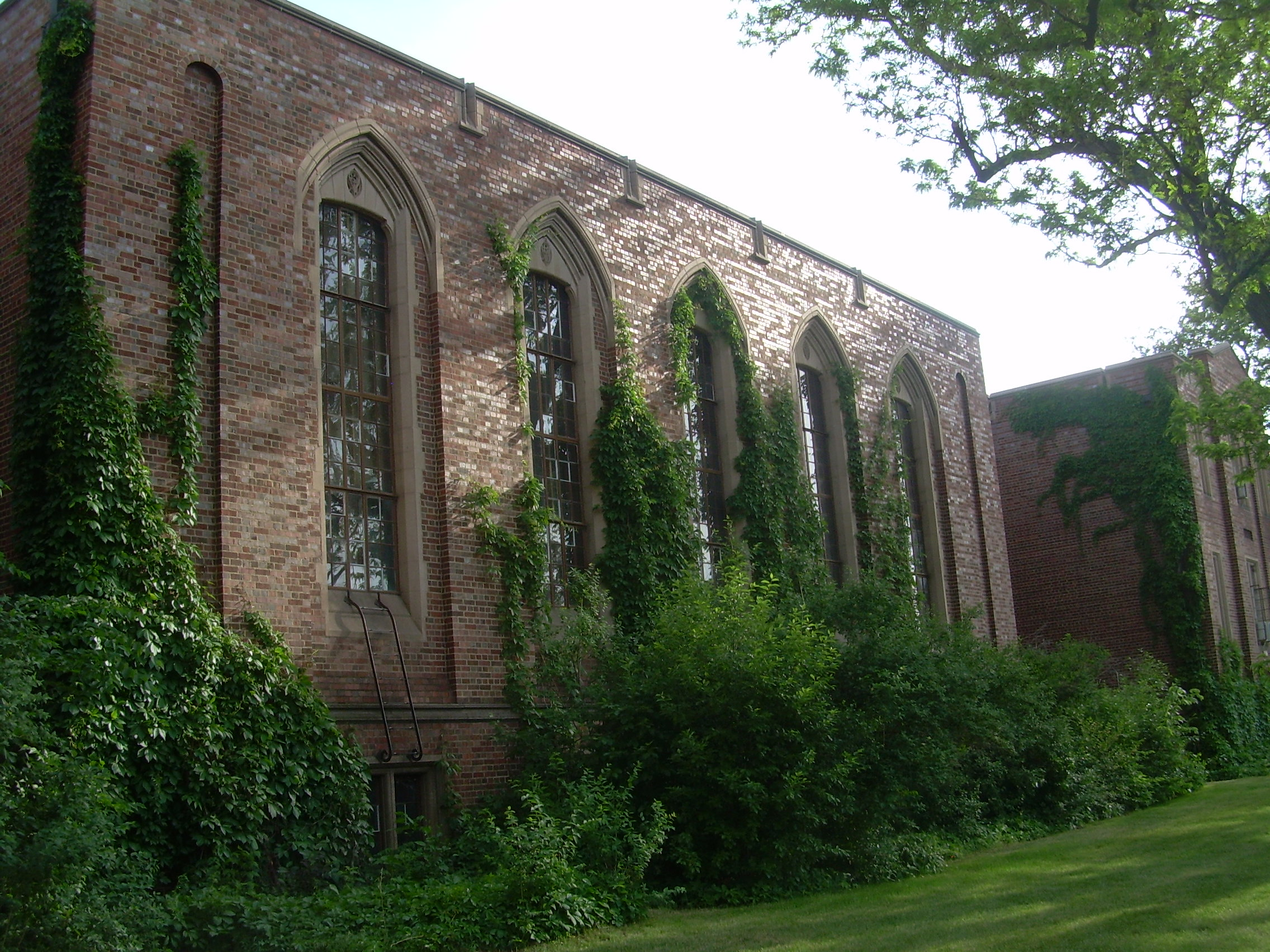
Margery Reed Hall Ivy

=== Study abroad program ===
In the 2017–18 academic year, DU had a 77.5 percent of participation in study abroad, leading the school to be third in national rank. The top destinations of DU students are United Kingdom (particularly Scotland), Spain and Italy, however many students go to universities in Australia and New Zealand.

=== Magazine ===
The University of Denver Magazine is published quarterly.

The Denver Quarterly was founded in 1966 by novelist John Edward Williams.

== Social Organizations ==
=== Performing Arts ===
The University of Denver's Skintight Outrage is the only collegiate improvisational comedy team in the Denver metropolitan area, having performed since the early 2010s.

=== Greek Life ===
The University of Denver has hosted fraternities and sororities for over 130 years.

=== Alpine Club ===
The University's Alpine Club supports outdoor recreation for its members.

== Athletics ==
DU's athletic teams are known as the Denver Pioneers. The school has been fielding athletic teams since 1867, winning 36 NCAA Division One titles since 1949—among the top 15 of all schools. Denver is best known as a major power in winter sports, in particular, skiing and ice hockey. DU has won 24 NCAA national team skiing championships (more than any other school). Ice hockey is DU's flagship spectator sport, with 11 NCAA titles (first among all schools), most recently in 2026 and including back-to-back crowns in 2004 and 2005. The program has produced 80 NHL players and regularly sells out the 6,000 seat Magness Arena on campus, the showpiece of the Ritchie Center for Sports and Wellness.

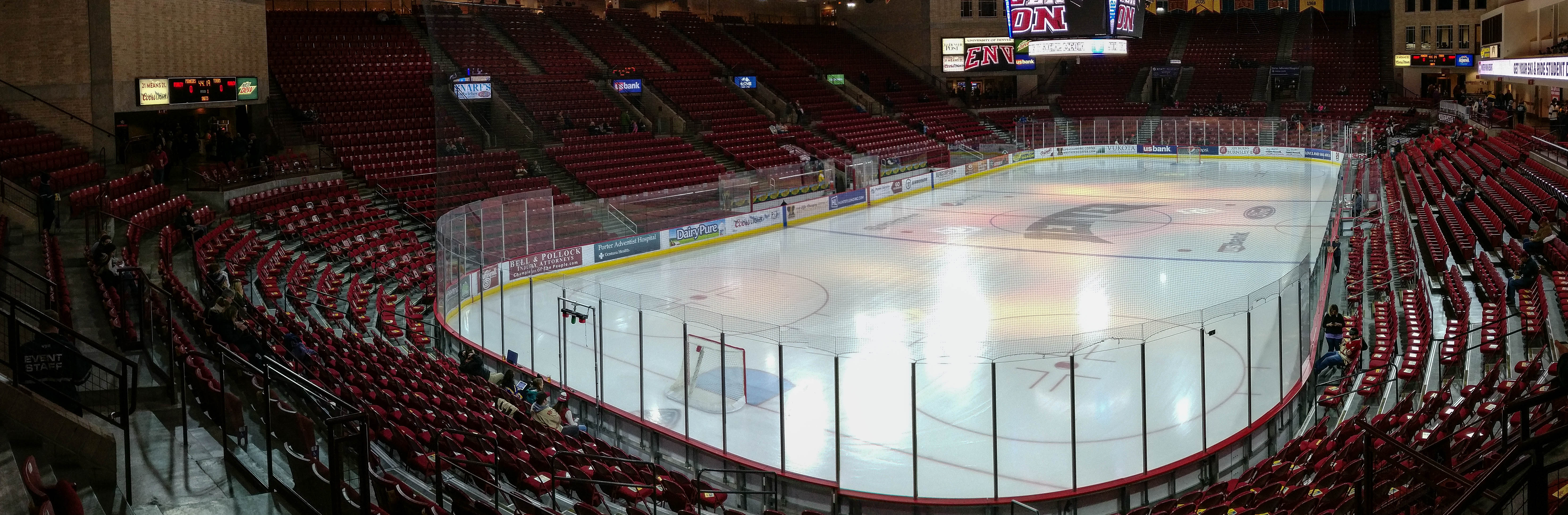
Magness Arena looking northwest

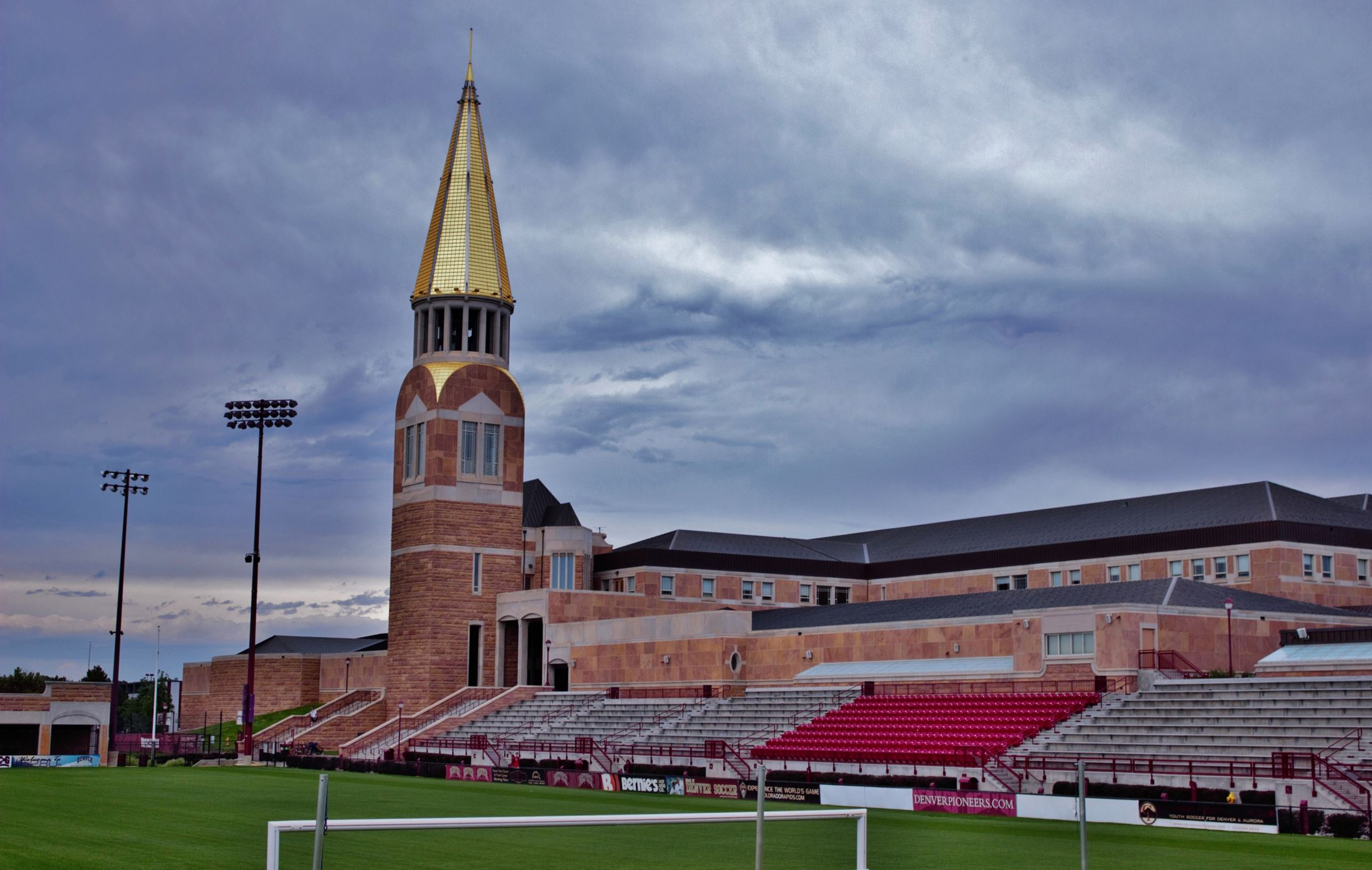
Exterior of the Daniel L. Ritchie Center

The Pioneers' major conference affiliations changed in July 2013. Denver moved its primary affiliation from the Western Athletic Conference to The Summit League, hockey moved from the Western Collegiate Hockey Association to the National Collegiate Hockey Conference, and men's lacrosse moved from the ECAC Lacrosse League to the Big East Conference. The women's lacrosse team also moved from the Mountain Pacific Sports Federation (MPSF) to the Big East Conference in 2017 and in 2019 they reached the Elite 8 (quarterfinals) of the NCAA tournament. In addition, the women's gymnastics team joined the newly formed Mountain Rim Gymnastics Conference in 2013 and later moved to the Big 12 Conference in July 2015.

In July 2026, DU left the Summit League to join the West Coast Conference.

=== Pioneers moniker controversy ===
The school has used the Pioneers nickname since 1925 after previously being known at the Fighting Parsons or Fighting Ministers (1919-1925). Under the Pioneers moniker, DU athletic teams have had the following mascots: Pioneer Pete (1925 to 1968), Denver Boone (1968 to 1998), Ruckus the red-tailed hawk (1999 to 2007), and since 2008, the school has been without an official mascot. Denver Boone first fell into controversy in 1984 when university administrators began to phase out the Daniel Boone-inspired mascot due to "male gender stereotyping and its specifically western symbolism". By 1999, the transition away from Boone was complete with the unveiling of Ruckus by Chancellor Daniel Ritchie. Ruckus was eventually phased out in 2008 after failing to gain traction with students, student-athletes, and alumni. In 2013, a task force was formed to generate three new mascot options - a jackrabbit, an elk, or a mountaineer - under the Pioneers moniker. Although a survey found 70% of respondents would be receptive or neutral on a new mascot, respondents did not coalesce around any option to merit selection.

Despite the removal of Denver Boone as the official mascot, the university maintains Pioneers as the moniker for its athletics and general university representation. The use of the Pioneers moniker has generated controversy among faculty, staff, and students. The university founder territorial governor John Evans was found culpable by a university committee in the Sand Creek massacre. In November 1864, US Cavalry attacked the Cheyenne and Arapahoe people at a site near Eads, in Southeastern Colorado, killing mostly women, children, and elders. DU has deep ties to the Sand Creek Massacre. Not only was John Evans the founder of the university, Colonel John Chivington who led the attack was also one of the early donors and Board of Trustees members. In 2014, the DU John Evans Study Committee Report was produced and found Evans culpable for the massacre, given his "aggressively anti-Native rhetoric and actions leading up to the massacre".

The scholars on the DU Evans Committee recommended removing the Pioneers moniker, as it glorified the violent legacy of settler colonialism that was specifically perpetrated against Native peoples in the area. Since the university is committed to diversity, equity, and inclusion, the report argues that removing this horrific reminder is necessary: "Instead of asking Native community members whose ancestors were sacrificed before the march of American settler pioneers to sacrifice yet again for the sake of our 'brand,' the University of Denver should finally lay the Pioneer moniker to rest."

In 2016 and 2017, some students demanded change from the university administration. In October 2017, the Native Student Alliance organization started the #NoMorePios movement. During the civil rights uprising in summer 2020, a new student group called Righteous Anger! Healing Resistance! came together to demand the removal of the Pioneers moniker and other actions that would support students from marginalized communities.

Fierce resistance to removing the moniker came from students, fans, and alumni who are attached to the name. They have been supported by Chancellor Haefner, who made a final decision to keep the moniker.

== Notable alumni and faculty ==
=== Alumni ===
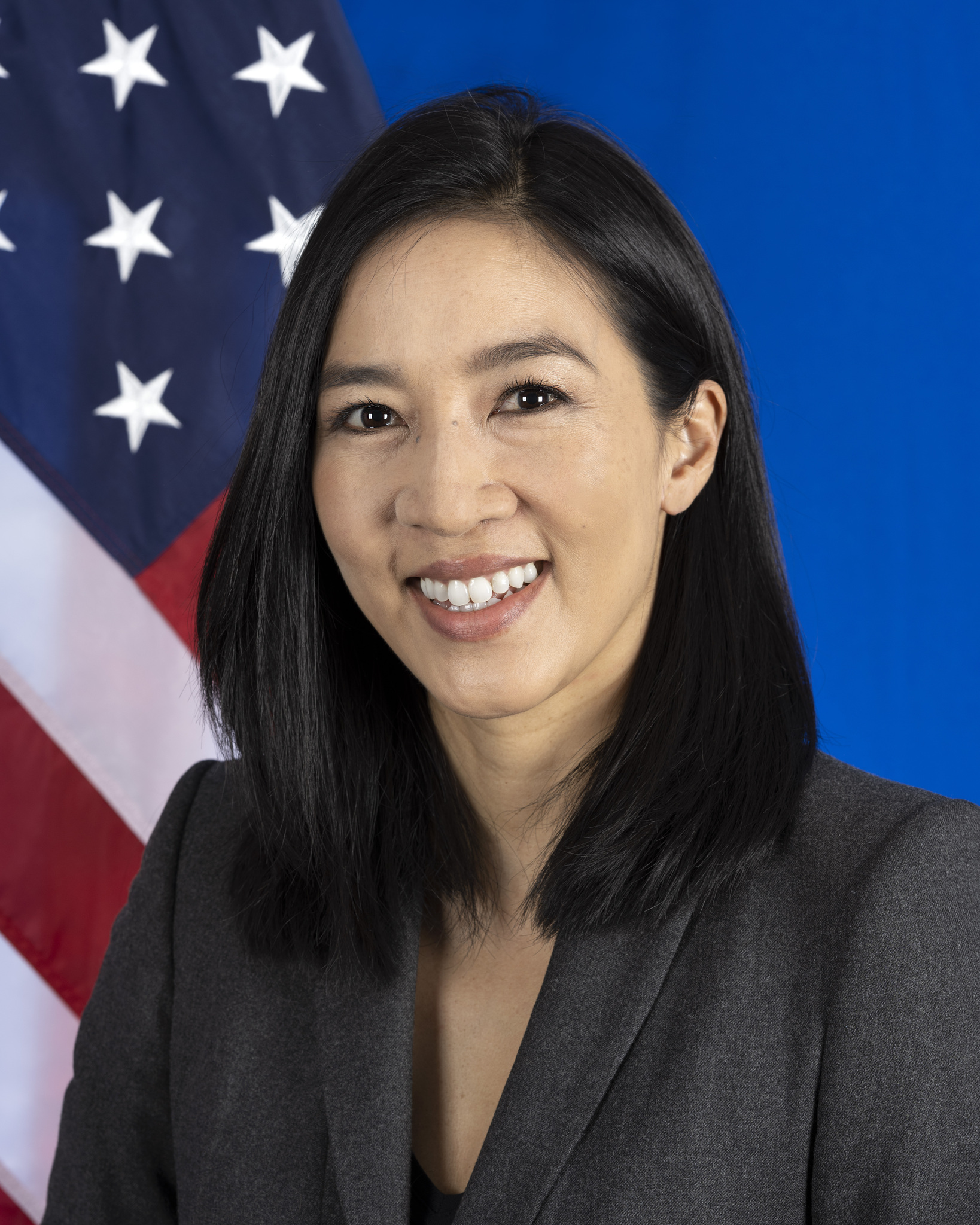
U.S. Ambassador to Belize and Olympic figure skater Michelle Kwan

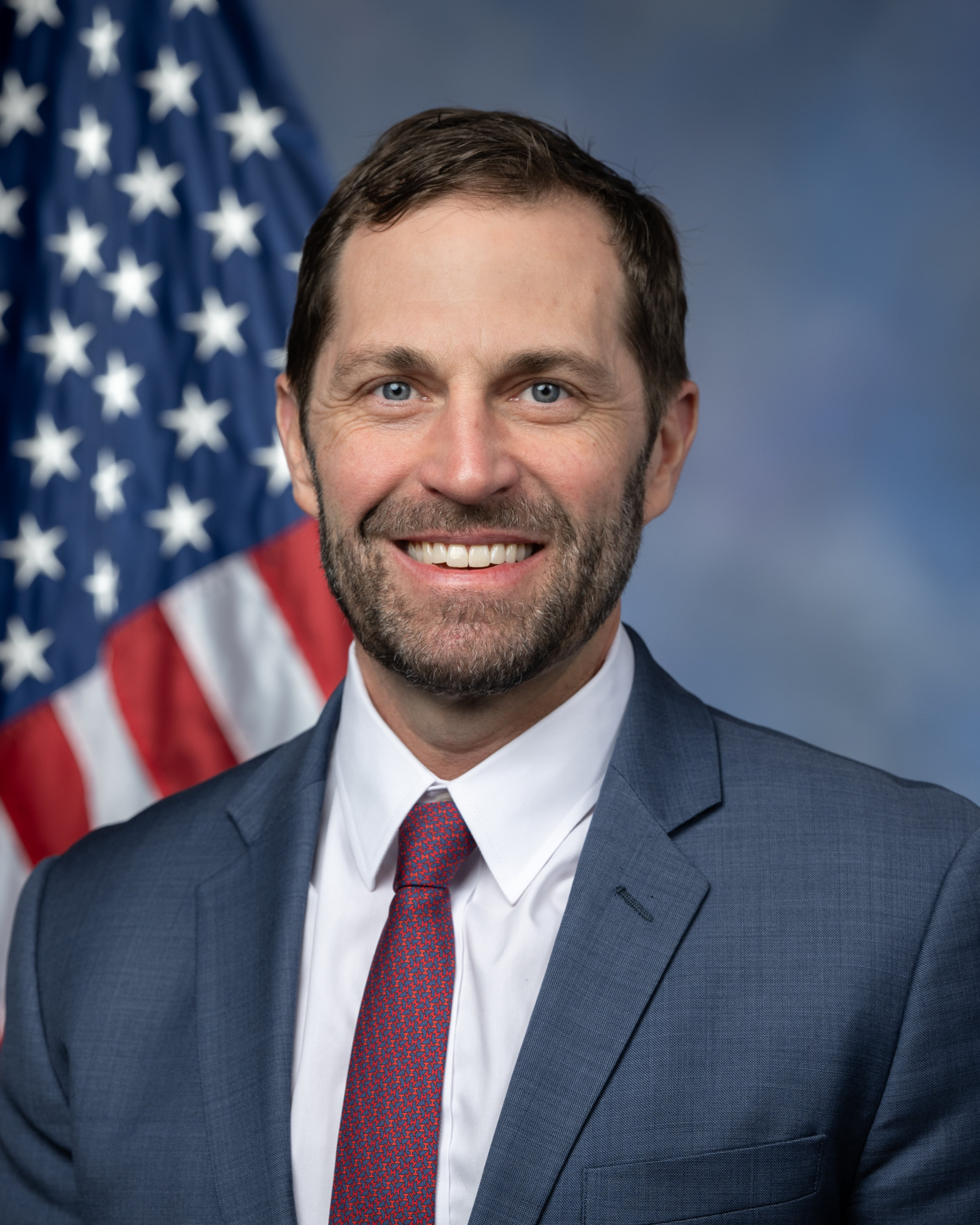
United States Congressman from Colorado Jason Crow

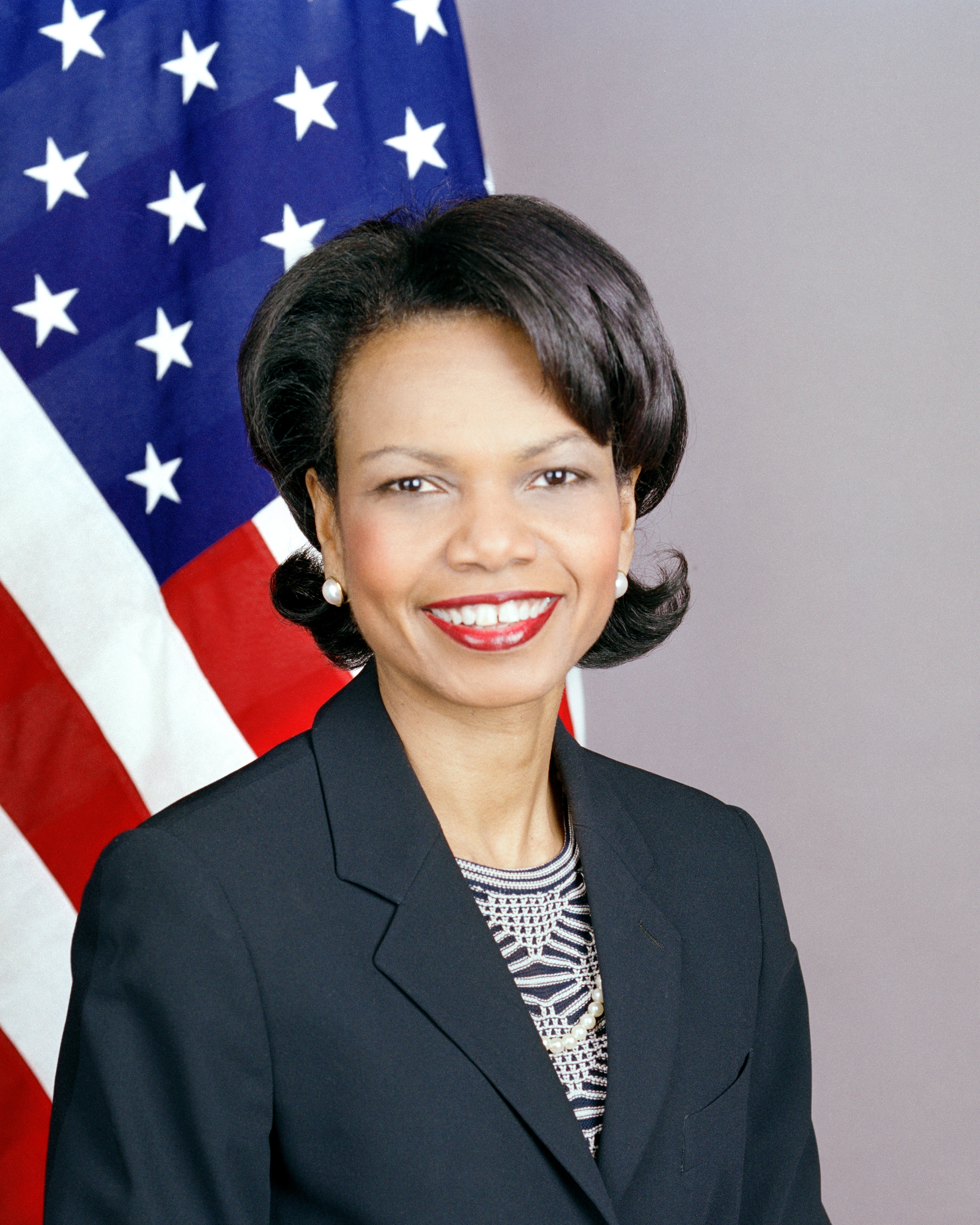
66th Secretary of State and 19th National Security Advisor Condoleezza Rice

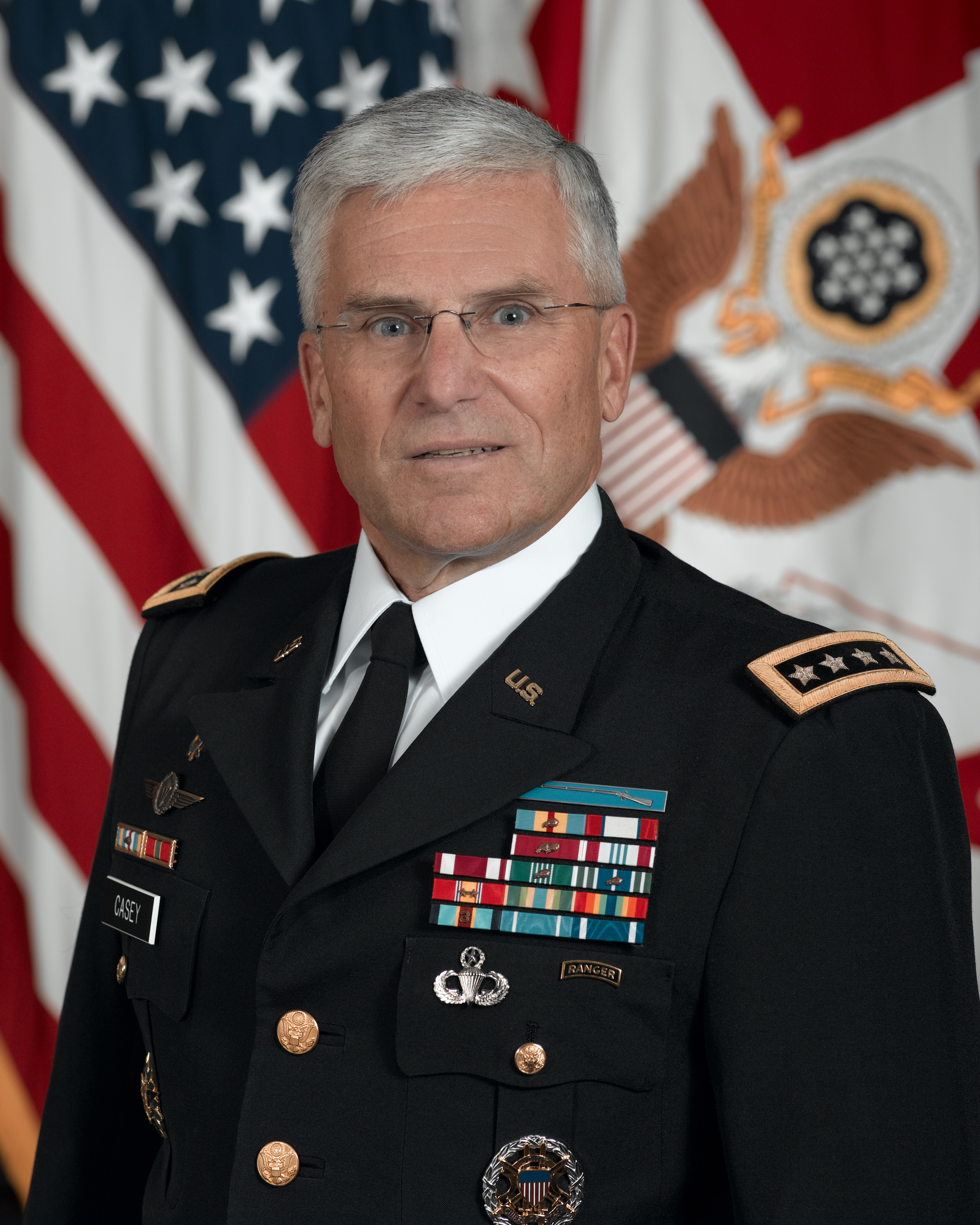
36th Chief of Staff of the United States Army George W. Casey Jr.

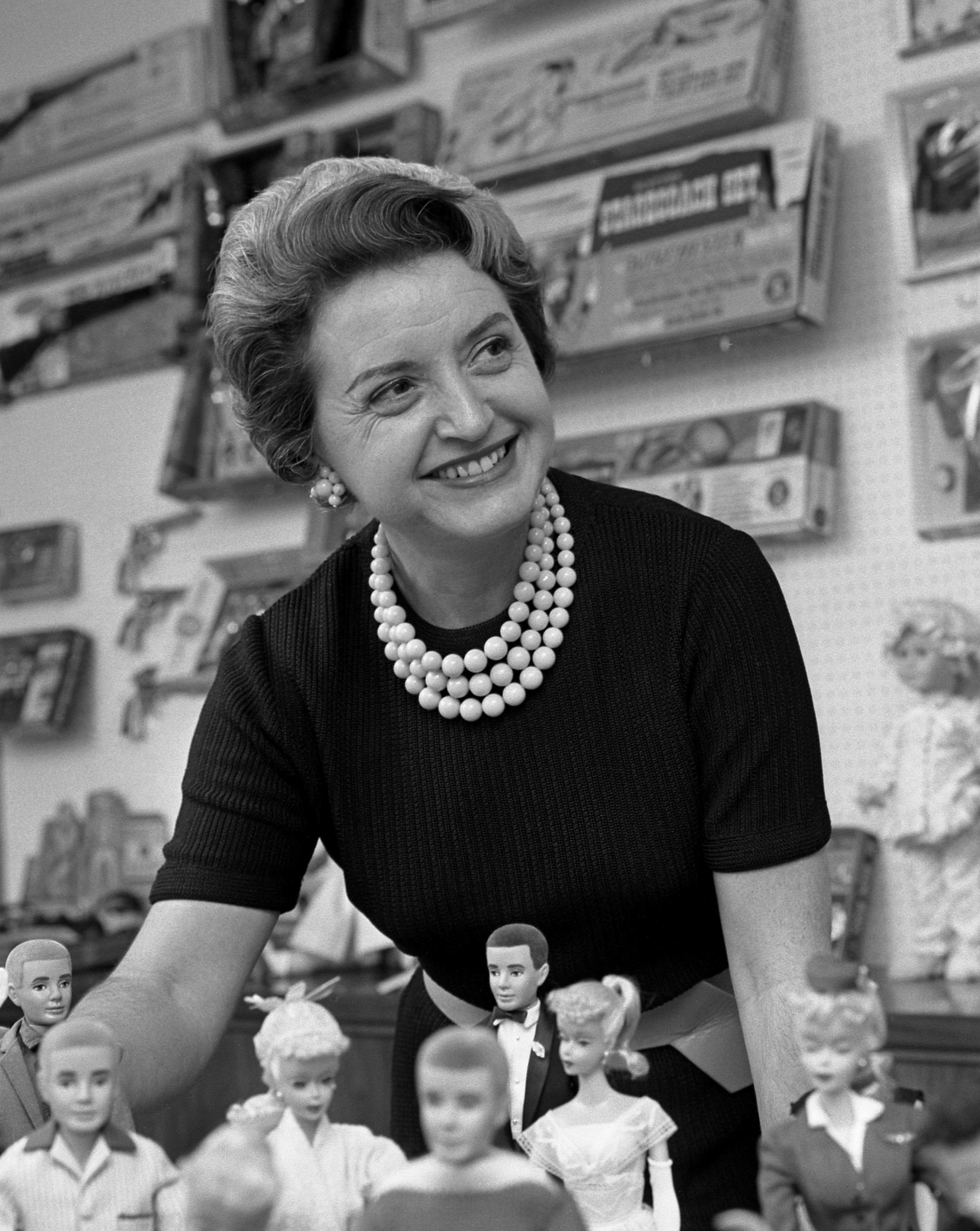
Creator of the Barbie and Ken doll Ruth Handler

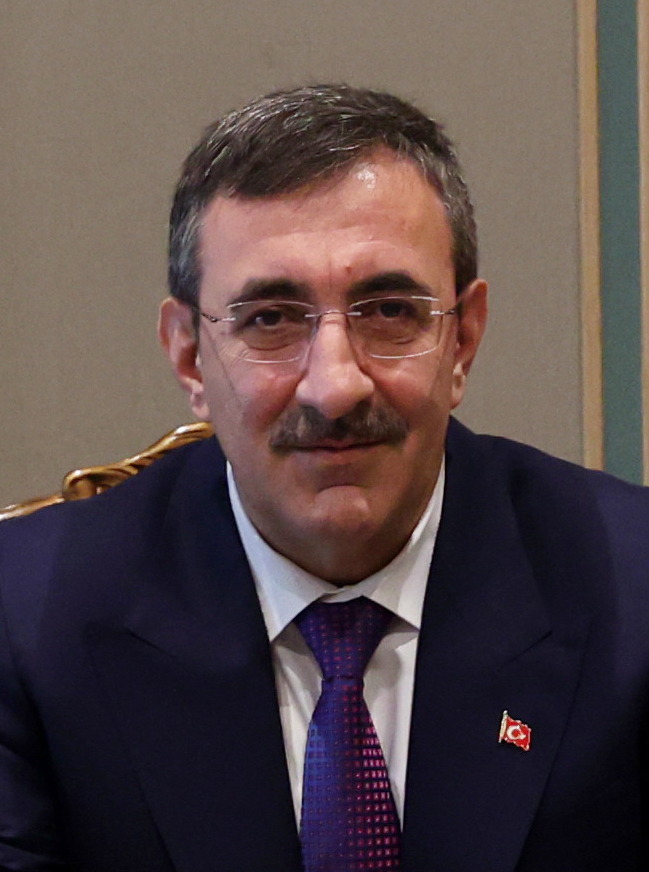
2nd Vice President of Turkey Cevdet Yılmaz

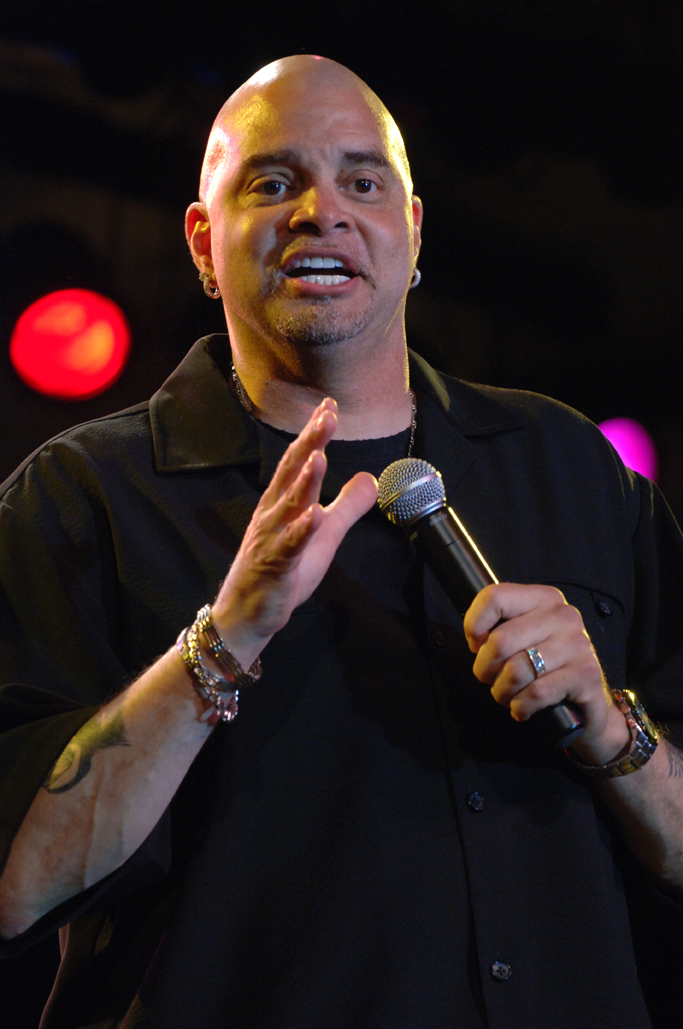
Comedian and actor Sinbad

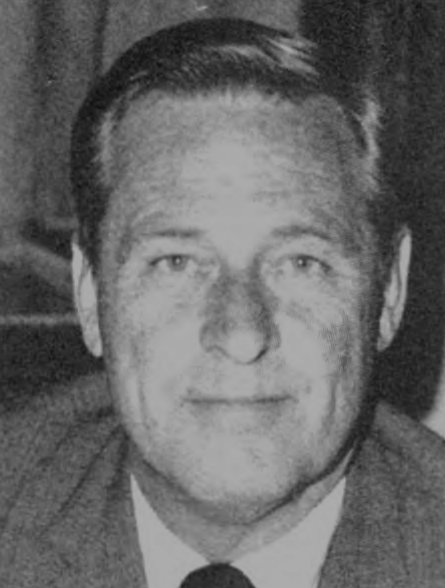
36th Governor of Colorado John Arthur Love

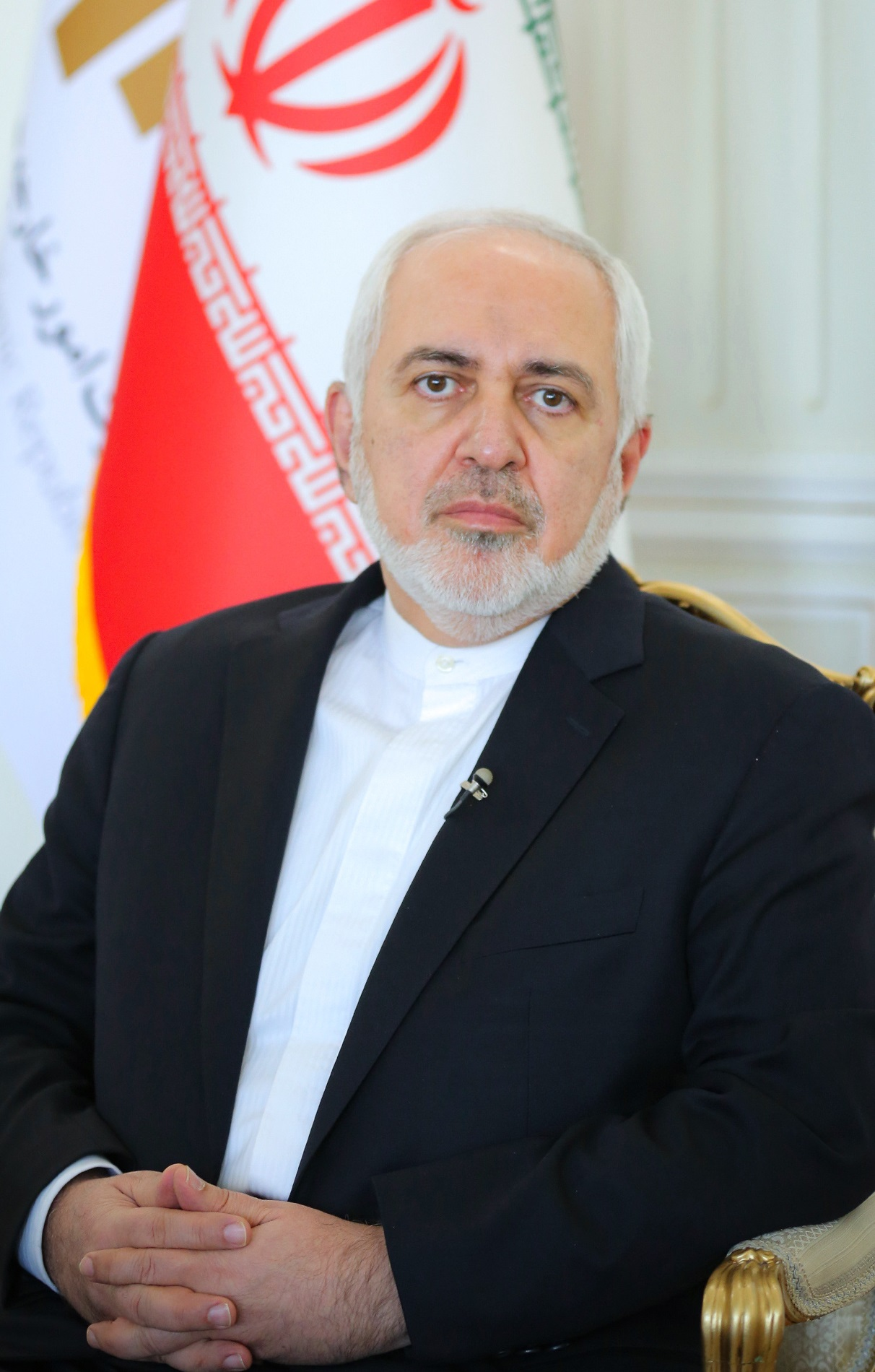
Minister of Foreign Affairs of Iran Mohammad Javad Zarif

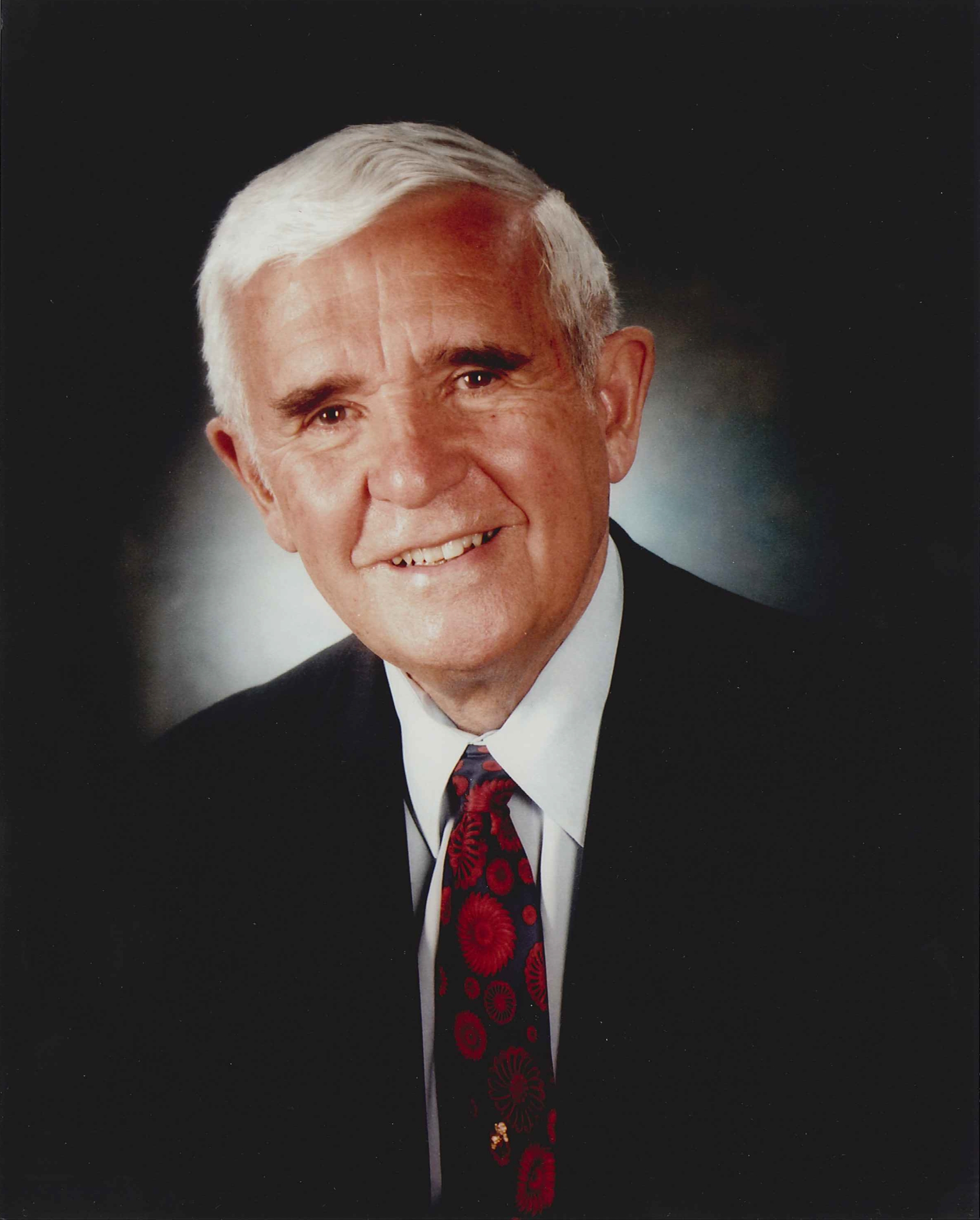
United States Senator from Nevada and 22nd Governor of Nevada Paul Laxalt

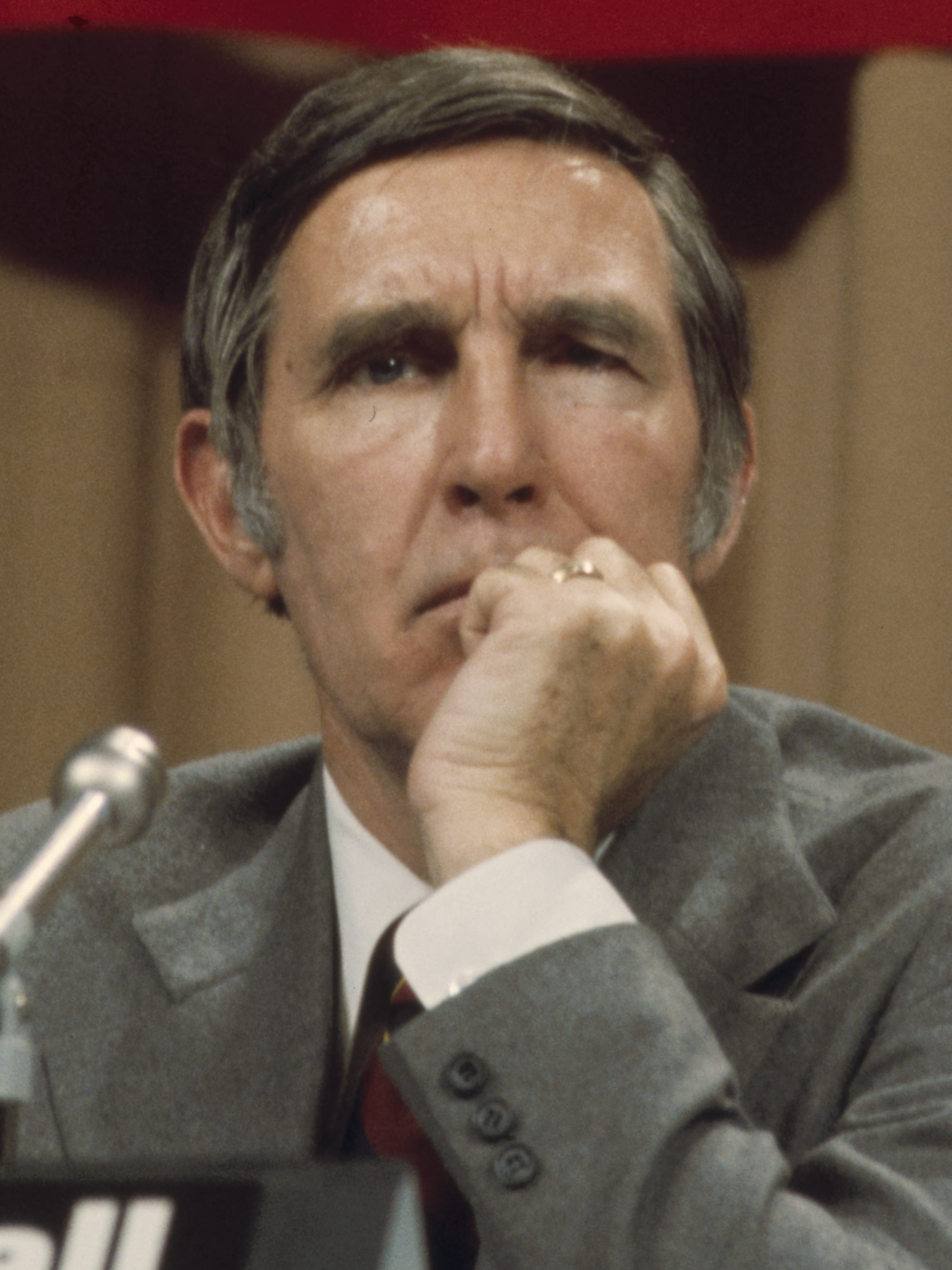
United States Congressman from Arizona and presidential candidate Mo Udall

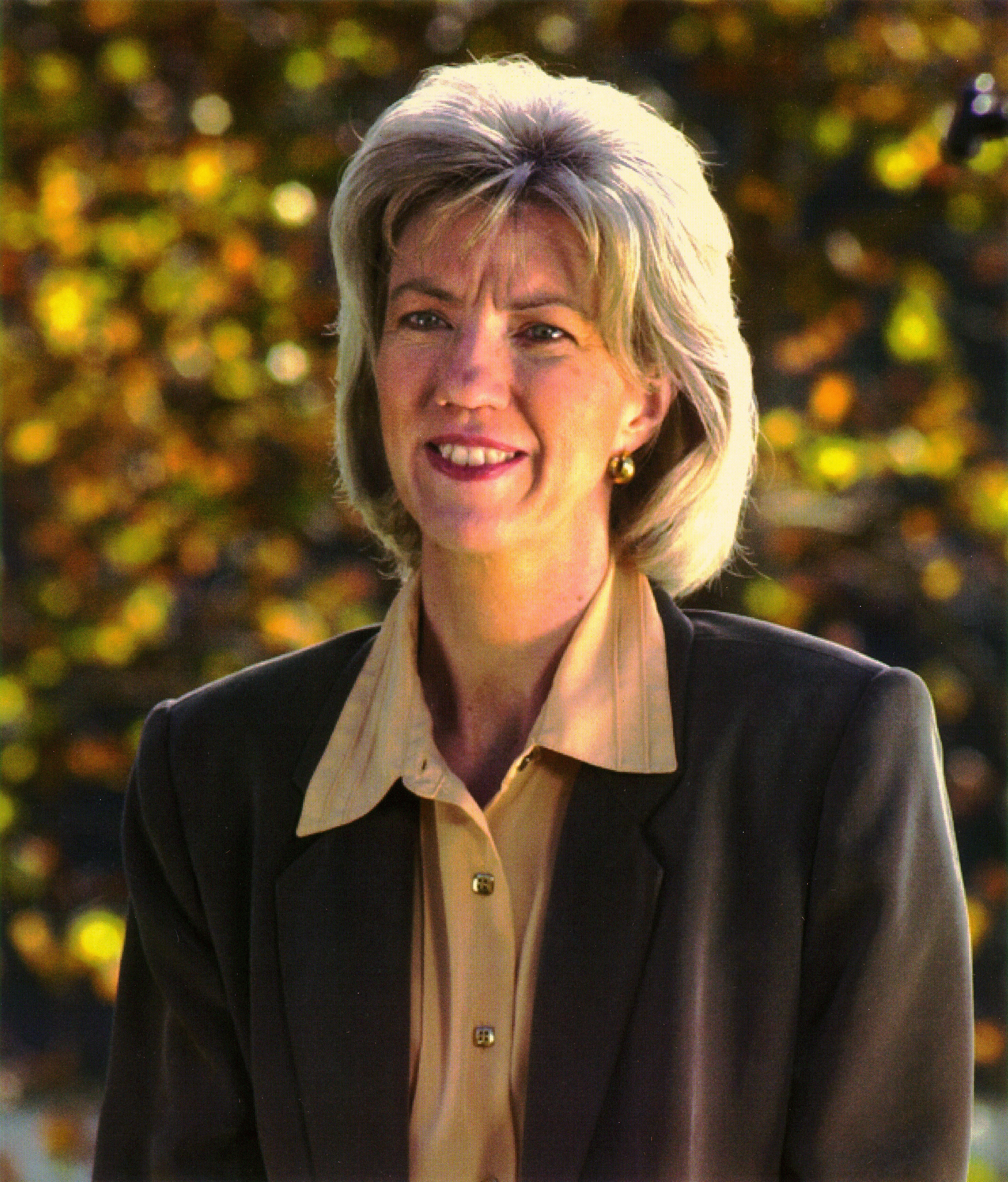
48th United States Secretary of the Interior Gale Norton

=== Faculty ===
- Lynn Schofield Clark, Professor and Director in Media, Film, and Journalism
- Robert Davine, Professor of Accordion and Music Theory
- Charles E. H. Kauvar, Professor of Rabbinic Literature
- Maciej Kumosa, Professor in the Department of Mechanical and Materials Engineering
- Thomas Nail, Professor of philosophy
- Galena K. Rhoades, Research professor
- Benzion Netanyahu, professor of Judaic studies
