= Daniels College of Business =

Business school of the University of Denver

Coordinates: 39°40′39.29″N 104°57′35.3″W

- Type: Private business college
- Established: 1908
- Parent institution: University of Denver
- Accreditation: AACSB International
- Dean: Naomi Boyd
- Undergraduates: 1,200
- Postgraduates: 1,000
- Location: Denver, Colorado, United States
- Campus: Urban
- Website: daniels.du.edu

The Daniels College of Business is the business college of the University of Denver, a private research university in Denver, Colorado. It was founded in 1908 and is the eighth oldest business school in the United States. Daniels currently enrolls approximately 2,300 students, divided between graduate, undergraduate programs, and dual undergraduate/graduate programs.

== Academics ==
The college offers undergraduate and graduate programs, including multiple MBA programs. It is accredited by the AACSB.
