= Olin College of Engineering =

Private engineering college in Needham, Massachusetts

Franklin W. Olin College of Engineering
- Other name: Olin College
- Namesake: Franklin W. Olin
- Type: Private college
- Established: 1997
- Accreditation: ABET; NECHE
- Academic affiliations: AITU; Space-grant
- Endowment: $487 million (2023)
- President: R. May Lee
- Faculty: 61
- Undergraduates: 402
- Location: 1000 Olin Way, Needham, Massachusetts, 02492, United States; 42°17′36.46″N 71°15′50.15″W
- Campus: Suburban
- Sporting affiliations: NEISA
- Mascot: Phoenix ("Frank")
- Website: www.olin.edu

The Franklin W. Olin College of Engineering, commonly known as the Olin College of Engineering, is a private college for engineering in Needham, Massachusetts, United States. It was founded in 1997. The college's endowment had been funded primarily by the 2005-defunct F. W. Olin Foundation.

The college originally covered 100% of each admitted student's tuition through the Olin Scholarship, but this reduced to 50% starting with the cohort of students entering in September 2010, and again reduced to $10,000 per school year, beginning with the cohort entering in September 2026.

== History ==
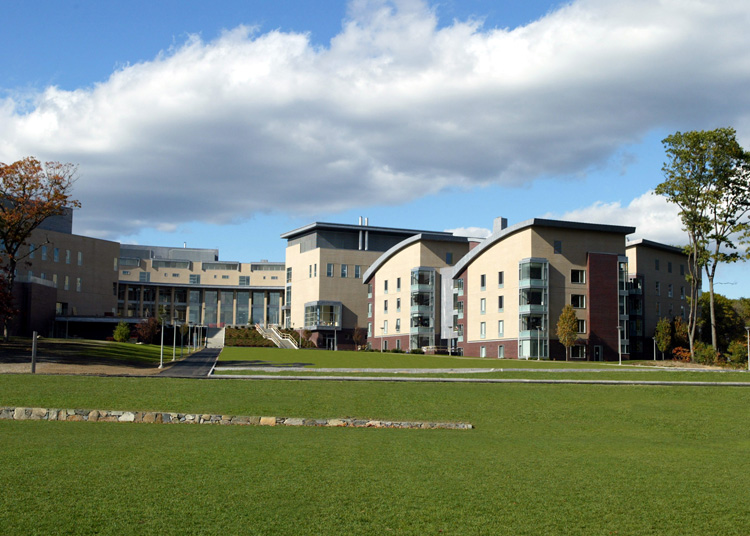
A view of Olin College. The dormitories are to the right; the Oval is straight ahead.

Olin College was founded by the F. W. Olin Foundation in 1997. The trustees were concerned about perpetuating Franklin W. Olin's donor intent indefinitely, so the foundation's president, Lawrence W. Milas, proposed creating a college. "We always had a bias toward supporting science and engineering schools because Mr. Olin was an engineer," Milas said. "I was concerned with whether or not this would be consistent with what Mr. Olin had ever considered. I went back and read minutes of board meetings. And sure enough, in the late 1940s, at two or three board meetings shortly before his death, he expressed the idea of starting a new institution."

By 2005, the foundation had donated most of its financial resources to the college, providing Olin with an endowment of about $460 million. Richard Miller was inaugurated as the college's first president on May 3, 2003. Miller was also the first employee of Olin College, and had been working as its president for several years before he was officially inaugurated.

In a program known as Invention 2000, Olin College hired its first faculty members and invited 30 students, known as Olin Partners, to help it form a curriculum. The students lived in temporary housing and spent their first year after high school investigating assessment and grading methods, jump-starting the student culture, and experimenting with forms of engineering education.

Olin admitted its first full class of 75 students in 2002. This class included the Olin Partners, a group of deferred students known as the Virtual Olin Partners, and recent high school graduates. After admitting three more classes, the college reached its full size of approximately 300 students in fall 2005. It currently has about 390 students.

Olin's campus was designed by the architecture firm Perry Dean Rogers Architects in the postmodern style. The first phase, comprising four buildings, was completed in 2002. The construction of a second dormitory, East Hall, was finished in fall 2005. Future plans include an academic building that would contain additional machine shops and project space. Olin shares many campus services, including health, public safety, and athletic facilities, with Babson College.

== Academics ==
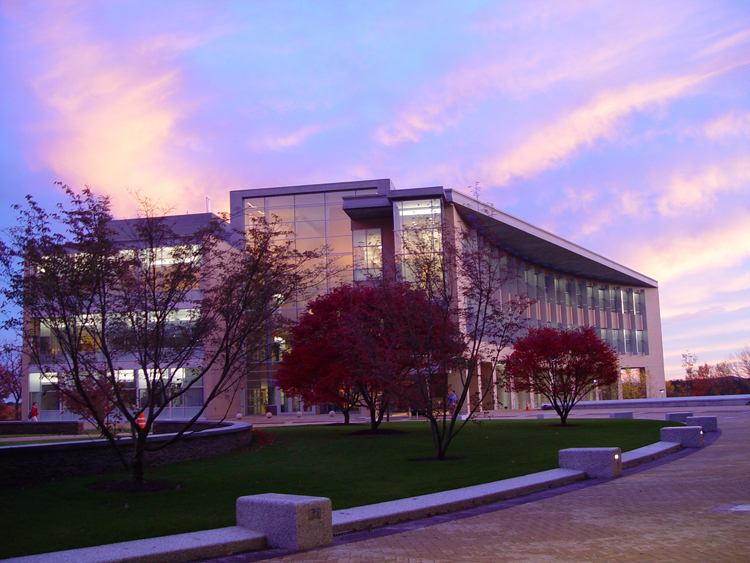
Sunset over Milas Hall

=== Teaching and learning ===
Olin College offers degrees in electrical and computer engineering (ECE), mechanical engineering (ME) and engineering (E). Within the engineering program, students may concentrate in computing (E:C), design (E:Design), bioengineering (E:Bio), robotics (E:ROBO), sustainability engineering (E:Sustainability), or they may design their own concentrations with the administration's approval.

Unlike many institutions, Olin College does not have separate academic departments. All faculty members hold five-year renewable contracts without offering tenure.

Classes emphasize context and interdisciplinary connections. Freshmen take integrated course blocks that teach engineering, calculus, and physics by exploring the relationships among the three subjects. Arts, humanities, social sciences, and entrepreneurship (AHSE) courses take an interdisciplinary approach to subjects such as the self ("What Is I?"), history ("History of Technology"), and art ("Wired Ensemble" and "Seeing and Hearing").

Olin also emphasizes practically grounded education, connecting concepts to real-world challenges and projects. Beginning in their first year, students receive training in Olin's machine shop for project-based work. First-year students are required to take "Design Nature", in which they design and build mechanical toys based on biological systems (such as the click beetle's jumping mechanism). Classes often take a "do-learn" format, with the application of concepts being taught before the formal introduction of the underlying theory.

As part of its mission to redefine engineering education, Olin is continually undergoing curriculum reviews. The goal of these reviews is to ensure that the college maintains a culture of change and continuous improvement. Significant aspects of the curriculum—such as student assessment, course offerings, and student workload—are considered for detailed review yearly.

Much of Olin College's curriculum is built around hands-on engineering and design projects. This project-based teaching begins in a student's first year and culminates in two senior "capstone" projects. In the engineering capstone, student teams are hired by corporations, non-profit organizations, or entrepreneurial ventures for real-world engineering projects. In the Design Justice Studio (DJS) capstone, students work on self-designed projects.

=== Accreditation ===
Olin College is accredited by the New England Commission of Higher Education and the Accreditation Board for Engineering and Technology.

== Admissions and financial aid ==
=== Admissions ===
Admissions to Olin College are selective, with, as of Fall 2022, 19% of applicants being admitted and the interquartile (middle 50%) of admitted students submitting scores under Olin College’s test-optional policy having SAT scores between 1500 and 1550 or ACT score of 35.

First-time Fall Freshman Admissions Statistics
	2023	2022	2021	2020	2019	2018	2017
Applicants	928	862	907	900	905	878	1062
Admits	201	165	163	148	142	138	142
Admit rate	21.7%	19.1%	18%	16.4%	15.7%	15.7%	13.4%
Enrolled	98	75	91	84	85	84	90
SAT range	1500–1560	1500–1550	1500–1550	1445–1560	1450–1540	1460–1550	1450–1570
ACT range	34–35	35–35	34–35	34–35	34–35	34–35	33–35

Admissions Office considers a student's GPA to be a very important academic factor, with a very high emphasis on an applicant's letters of recommendation, application essays, the rigor of academic record, and high school rank. In terms of non-academic materials as of 2022, Olin ranks extracurricular activities, the interview, talent/ability, and character/personal qualities as 'very important' in making first-time, first-year admission decisions while ranking whether the applicant is a first-generation college applicant, legacy preferences, state and geographical residence as 'considered'. Volunteer work, racial/ethnic status, and work experience are marked as 'important'. The level of an applicant's interest is highly accounted for in the admission decisions.

Olin College's admission process is non-conventional and follows a two-step process. Applicants first apply for admission through the Common App, and all applications are reviewed in January. A holistic review process then carefully evaluates each applicant’s academic and personal qualities to determine whether they will advance to the second phase of the admission process. About 225–250 applicants are invited to participate in the second phase, Candidates’ Weekends, for them to learn more about the Olin community, curriculum, and culture. All applicants who reach the second phase of the process are required to participate in Candidates’ Weekends, as the information gleaned provides the basis for final admission decisions.

=== Financial aid ===
All accepted students receive the merit-based Olin Tuition Scholarship, which pays $10,000 toward tuition a year and covers cross-registration of courses with Babson College, Wellesley College, and Brandeis University. Olin also shares clubs and intramural sports with those colleges. In addition to the Olin Scholarship, Olin follows need-aware admissions and provides need-based grants to meet each student's full demonstrated need. Olin also allows students to receive funding and non-degree credit for "passionate pursuits," personal projects that the college recognizes as having academic value.

It used to provide full-tuition scholarships, but in 2009, responding to a significant decline in the college's endowment caused by the Great Recession, the trustees decided to reduce the merit scholarships to half-tuition for all students since the 2010–11 academic year. The merit scholarship was then reduced to $10,000 a year starting in the 2026–27 academic year.

== Student life ==
=== Dormitories and student housing ===
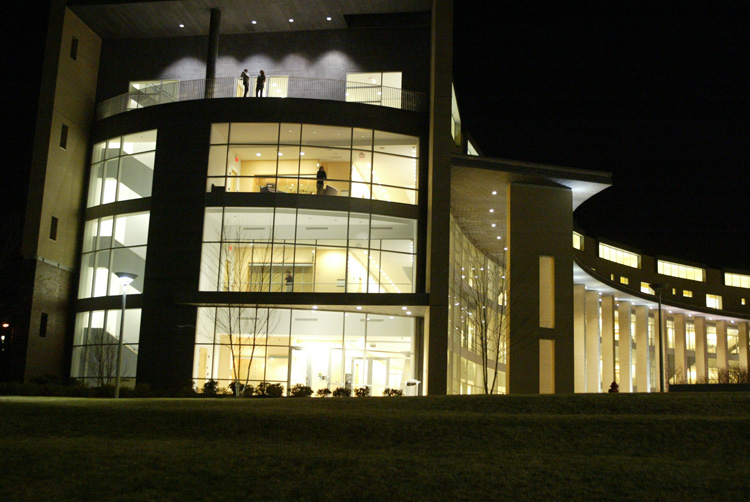
The Miller Academic Center at night

Olin College houses students in dorms and suites in either the West Hall or the East Hall. Olin students are required to live on campus unless an exception is made by the dean of student life due to personal circumstances (e.g., for married students or students with families nearby). In addition, the Office of Student Life picks student "resident resources" (R2s) to fill the role traditionally played by resident assistants (RAs) at other schools. Unlike most RAs, R2s are not directly responsible for enforcing dorm policies.

=== Honor code ===
The Olin Honor Code has five clauses: "Integrity", "Respect for Others", "Passion for the Welfare of Olin College", "Openness to Change", and "Do Something"..

=== Extracurricular activities ===
Students can participate in clubs, community service projects, co-curricular activities with faculty and staff (which are noted on transcripts), and "passionate pursuits" (independent projects eligible for funding and/or non-degree credit).

Olin does not compete alone in the NCAA, and the regional NCAA conference—the New England Women's and Men's Athletic Conference—has not given approval for students to compete with Babson's varsity teams. Olin students are, however, allowed to participate in club teams and non-NCAA sports at Babson, and the Babson women's rugby team includes several Olin members. Olin has two soccer teams that compete through a Boston athletic organization, as well as an Ultimate team that competes in the BUDA league and the Ultimate Players Association. Additionally, students participate in Sunday morning football games, intramural sports, pick-up Ultimate games, the Student Martial Arts Club, a fencing club, and other athletic organizations.

=== Mascot ===
In 2002, the Olin Partners and Virtual Olin Partners selected the phoenix as the school's mascot. The mascot, sometimes unofficially called Frank, represents Olin's willingness to reinvent itself, just as the phoenix is reborn from its ashes. In 2013, Olin underwent a rebranding, and the original school colors, blue and silver, are now seen together only in the school seal and on diplomas. Everywhere else, the school now uses gradients of bright colors.

== Reputation and rankings ==
In the 2026 U.S. News & World Report college rankings, Olin was ranked third for the best undergraduate engineering programs among non-doctorate-granting institutions in the United States.

As of 2014, The Princeton Review ranked Olin College second for classroom experience, third for dormitories, third for amount of studying, fourth for student opinion of professors, fifth for ease of getting around campus, eighth for LGBT friendliness, 11th for financial aid, 11th for quality of life, 12th for science laboratory facilities, 17th for career services, and 19th for student happiness.

In 2006, Olin was selected by Kaplan, Inc. and Newsweek as one of "America's 25 New Ivies".

Business Insider ranked Olin first on its "Best 20 College Campuses in the US" list in 2014. It was eighth on Forbes's "Top 25 Colleges Ranked By SAT Score", with an average combined critical reading and math score of 1489.

== Media coverage ==
In 2014, the Boston Globe published an article that criticized the school for poor management of its endowment. The Globe pointed out that despite the abandonment of full-tuition scholarships, Olin's spending remained relatively constant, and payroll costs rose 16% between 2009 and 2011. It also noted that Olin's administrators received "significantly more than the median salaries of executives in comparable positions", and that Moody's had downgraded the institution's bond rating. In an open letter to the Olin community, President Richard Miller defended the decisions of the administration and rebutted several of the points made in the article. The college successfully petitioned the Globe to release an official clarification, which stated that the article had "failed to include the most recent financial information available". The Boston Business Journal also challenged the Globe's assessment of Olin's finances, reporting that revenue and enrollment had "rebounded smartly" in 2013 from recession lows.

== Notable alumni ==
- Alec Radford, co-author of GPT-1, GPT-2, GPT-3, GPT-4. h-index 52 on Google Scholar in April 2026
- Etosha Cave, co-founder and chief scientific officer of Twelve, a carbon dioxide recycling startup
- Frances Haugen, data engineer, scientist, product manager, and Facebook whistleblower
- Gui Cavalcanti, robotics engineer, founder of Open Source Medical Supplies, Artisan's Asylum, and MegaBots Inc.
- Kevin Tostado, American documentary filmmaker, and founder of Tostie Productions

== See also ==
- Association of Independent Technological Universities
- Argosy Foundation
