= Gui Cavalcanti =

Robotics, community and PPE entrepreneur

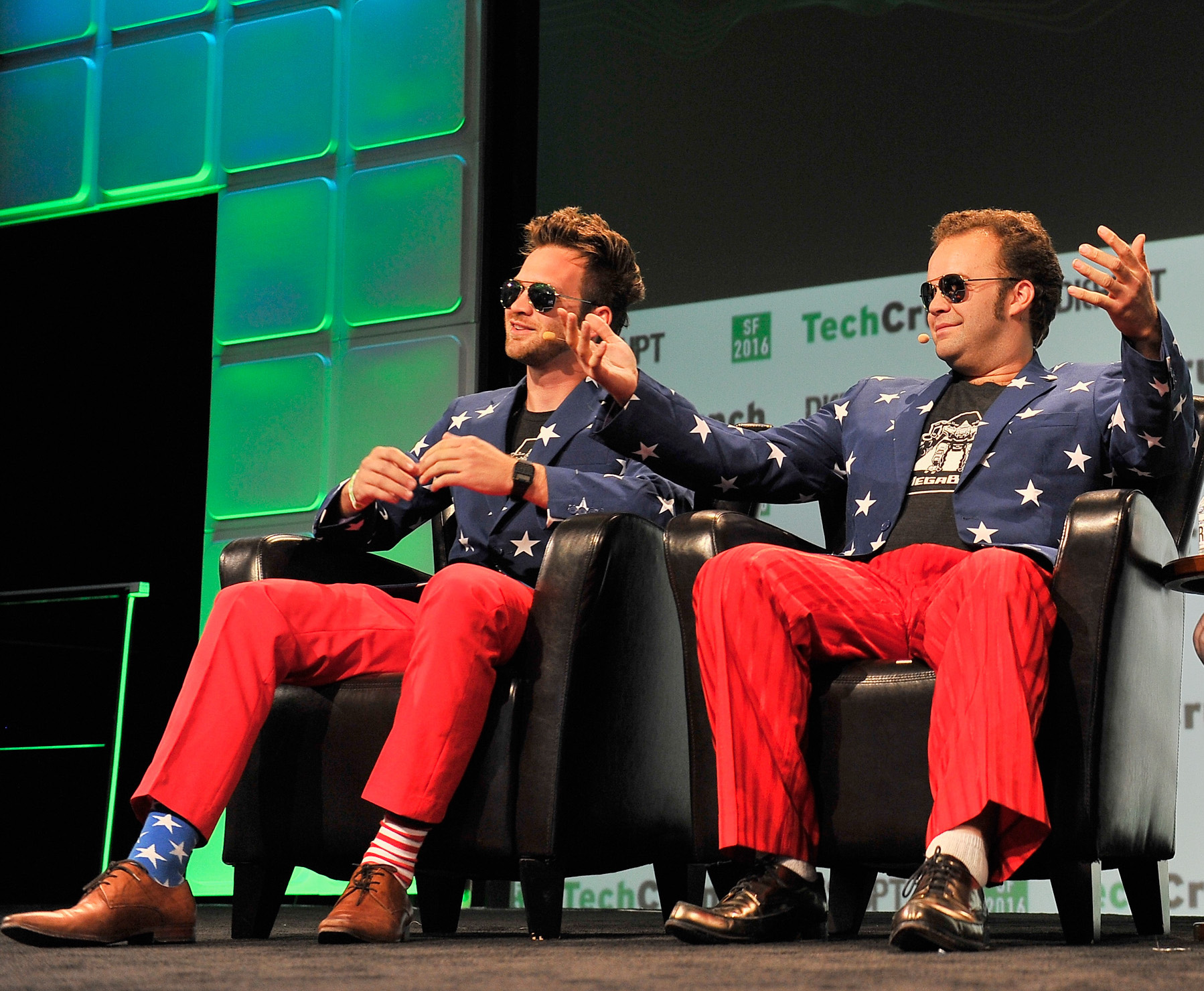
- Cavalcanti (right) at TechCrunch San Francisco 2016
- Education: Olin College
- Known for: Founding Open Source Medical Supplies, Artisan's Asylum, and MegaBots Inc.

Gui Cavalcanti is a robotics engineer who co-founded Open Source Medical Supplies, Artisan's Asylum, and MegaBots Inc.

== Education ==
Cavalcanti studied engineering at Olin College.

== Career ==
Cavalcanti initially worked at Boston Dynamics, before creating communal workshop Artisan's Asylum in Somerville, Massachusetts, in 2010 which Wired magazine reported as being the world's largest hackerspace.

Cavalcanti co-founded California based MegaBots Inc., a company that built a giant fighting robot that appeared in the Guinness book of records and on Jay Leno's Garage in 2018. In 2015 Cavalcanti uploaded a video to YouTube inviting the team that owned and operated Japanese fighting robot Kuratas to a duel.

Cavalcanti stars in the movie The Giant Robot Duel: MegaBots vs. Suidobashi.

In 2020, in response to the COVID-19 pandemic, Cavalcanti co-founded Open Source Medical Supplies, an organization that collates and shared open source designs for medical supplies.

== See also ==
- Artisan's Asylum
- MegaBots Inc.
