= Maker's Asylum =

Makerspace / hackerspace which started in Mumbai

Coordinates: 19°07′11.58″N 72°52′31.54″E

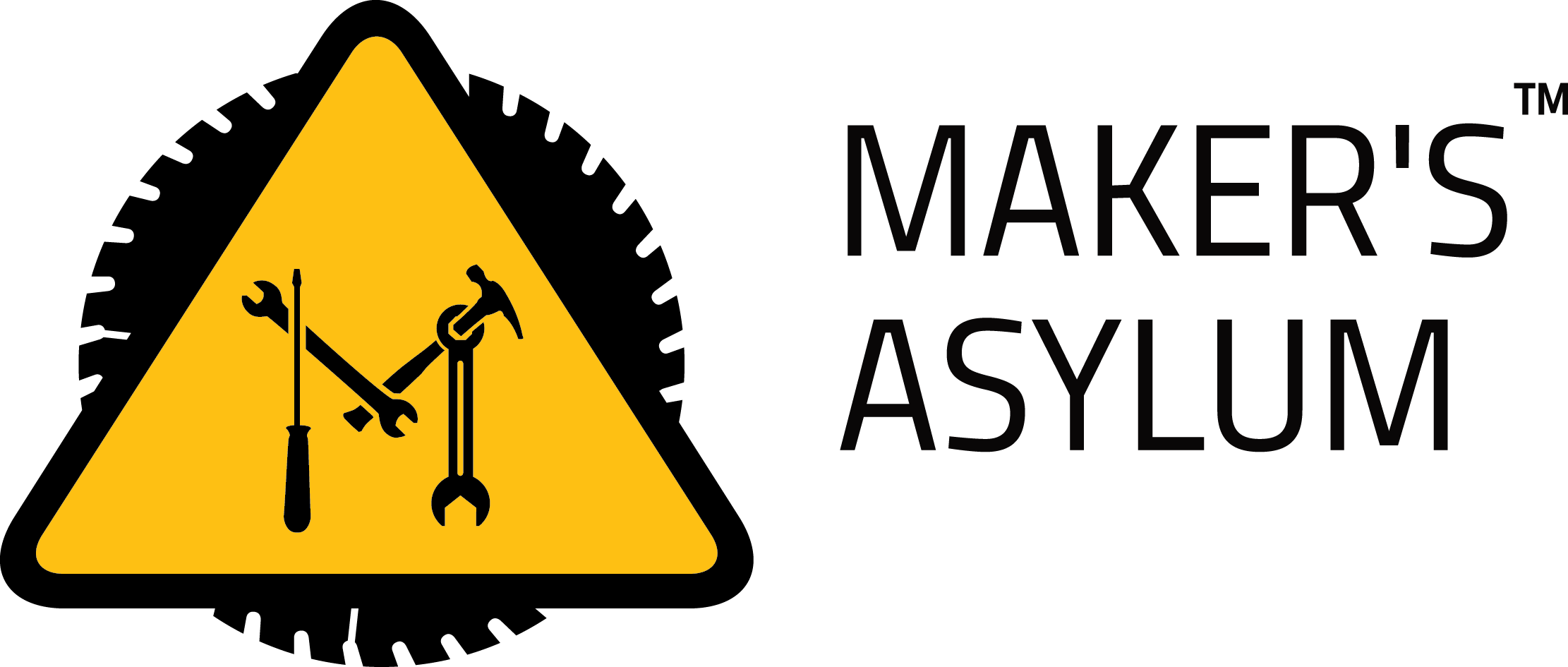
- Formation: 2013
- Legal status: Foundation & Company
- Purpose: Learning by Making, enabling makers
- Headquarters: Goa
- Location: INDIA
- Origin: Mumbai
- Founders: Vaibhav Chhabra, Anool Mahidharia
- Website: www.makersasylum.com

Maker's Asylum is a makerspace / hackerspace which started in Mumbai back in 2013 and is now headquartered in Goa, India, inspired by Artisan's Asylum, Chaos Computer Club and other maker organisations.

== History ==
Over the years Maker's Asylum has graduated from being a DIY (do it yourself) space to working at the intersection of education and open innovation through its programs and social impact work. With alumni and partners in over 30 countries, Maker's Asylum has enabled a plethora of open source projects and even startups in the areas of hardware, design and sustainability. Nurturing the culture of innovation it has been on the forefront of the maker movement in India.

Trained over 100,000 individuals in hardware design, additive manufacturing, and digital fabrication.

== Educational Programs ==
Maker's Asylum offers various independent programs that focus on their mission of "Learning by Making" and enabling more makers such as DIY Hour (8+), Innovation School (13+) and SDG School (15+). All their programs do not have an upper limit on age as they believe that anyone can start their maker journeys at any time.

They also offer woodworking residency and workshops and also curate exciting events and workshops with the maker community such as Rapid Prototyping, Boat Making, Pechakucha nights and more. Various corporate organisations have also engaged with Maker's Asylum for their workshops to bring in the hands on learning experience to their teams.

== Social Impact Work ==
During the pandemic, Maker's Asylum, the largest network of decentralized “makers” across India, mobilized its members to produce urgently needed medical supplies locally across India. Major milestones include :

- Producing 1 million face shields in 49 days by open sourcing their designs and activating makers in 42 cities, towns and villages of India to use the laser cutting machine to make during the first national lockdown in 2020;
- Successfully designing and building the M19 high-flow, open-source oxygen concentrator with 150 organizations in April 2021;
- Maker's Asylum has also stepped up to help solve the problem of broken equipment, especially the large number of oxygen concentrators from China, USA, and France that are not working. With support from the European Union, three oxygen concentrator ‘repair camps” have been conducted and in response to a request from the Rotary Club of Margao, Goa, hundreds of non-functioning oxygen concentrators have been assessed and fixed;
- Maker's Asylum undertook a wider study to better understand the scale of broken medical grade equipment in India and is working on how local communities can be skilled on repair and reuse.
