= Suidobashi =

Suidobashi may refer to:

- Suidōbashi Station
- Suidobashi Heavy Industry
