= Mark II (robot) =

Mark II is a rideable and user-operated robot built by the American company MegaBots Inc. The robot made its debut in May 2015 at Maker Faire San Mateo. An updated version of the robot, Mk.III, was scheduled in August 2017 to engage in a head-to-head fight with Kuratas, a robot built by Suidobashi Heavy Industry of Japan. MegaBots announced plans in August 2015 to upgrade Mark II with melee capabilities in order to confront Kuratas, using funds from a Kickstarter campaign.

== See also ==
- Mecha
- Powered exoskeleton
- Artificial intelligence
- Glossary of robotics
