= Jay Leno's Garage =

Television series

- Genre: Motoring; Reality television
- Starring: Jay Leno
- Country of origin: United States
- Original language: English
- No. of seasons: 7
- No. of episodes: 88

Production
- Executive producers: Jay Leno, Abby Schwartzwalder, Jeff Bumgarner, Adam Barry, Jim Ackerman, Sarah Whalen
- Producers: Robert Angelo; Helga Pollock; Kico Velarde; Robert Hayes; David Swift; Tony Sam
- Cinematography: Jake Loyd
- Running time: 60 minutes (with commercials)
- Production companies: Original Productions; Big Dog Productions; Kitten Kaboodle; NBC Entertainment Digital (web series)

Original release
- Network: CNBC (2015–2022)
- Release: October 7, 2015 – October 26, 2022

Related
- The Tonight Show with Jay Leno; The Jay Leno Show

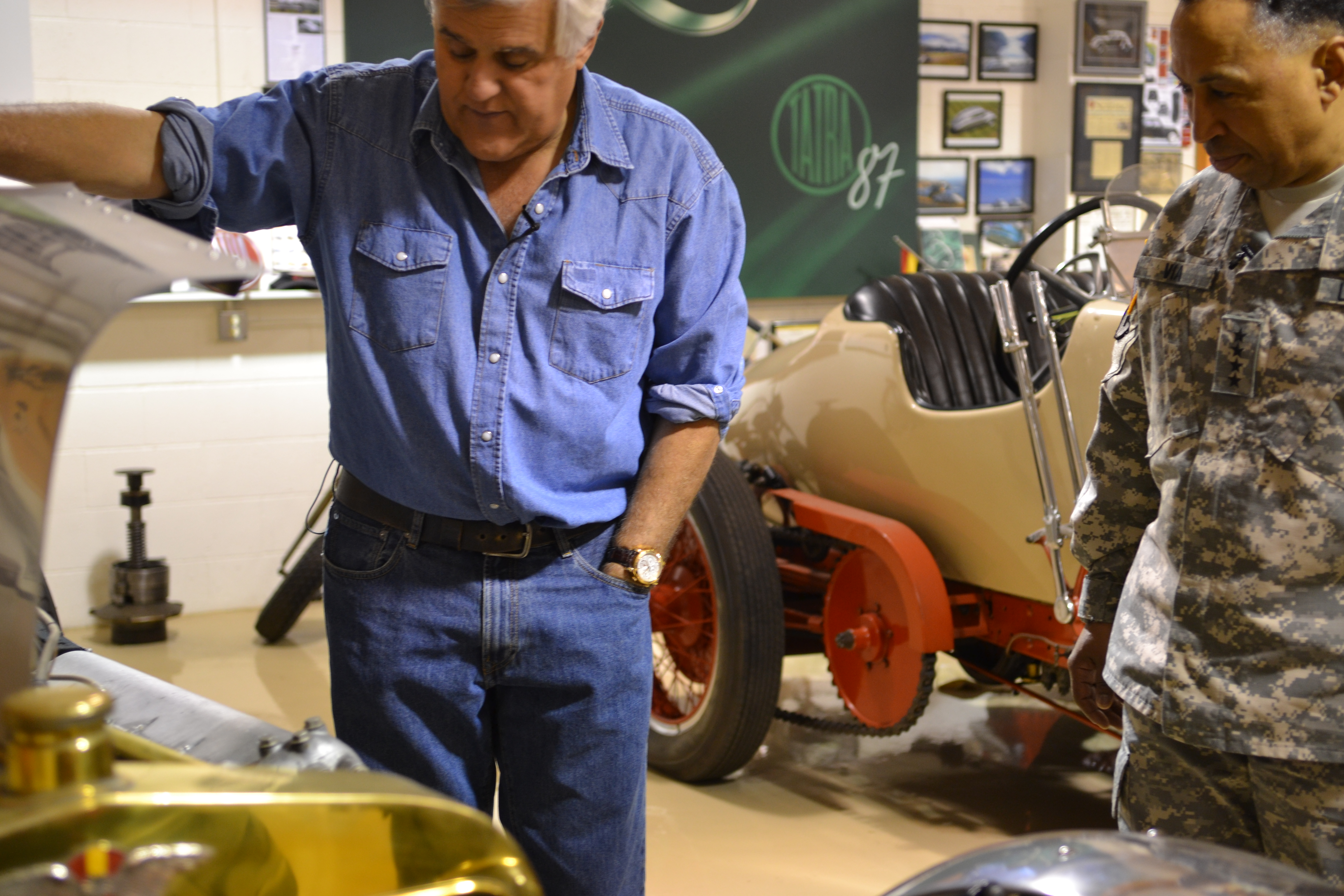
Leno examines the U.S. Army's fuel-efficient FED Alpha along with General Dennis L. Via.

Jay Leno's Garage is an American web and former television series about motor vehicles and automotive culture, produced by and starring Jay Leno, the former host of The Tonight Show. It began in 2014 as a web series for NBC.com; a special also aired on CNBC in August of that year. In 2015, the show became a weekly prime-time series on the channel, where it aired until 2022 before moving to YouTube.

Leno's reviews cover classic cars, super cars like the McLaren P1, restored cars, vintage and sports cars. Jay Leno's Big Dog Garage is located in Burbank, California, near Hollywood Burbank Airport. In 2016, the show won a Primetime Emmy Award for "Outstanding Special Class – Short-Format Nonfiction Program".

In January 2023, the network announced its decision to stop broadcasting the series after seven seasons. Leno continues to produce the series for his YouTube channel, which has over 3.99 million subscribers as of August 2026.

== Episodes ==
Season	Episodes	Originally released	
Season	Episodes	First released	Last released
1	8	October 7, 2015	December 2, 2015
2	12	June 15, 2016	December 14, 2016
3	16	June 28, 2017	February 8, 2018
4	16	April 19, 2018	September 20, 2018
5	16	August 28, 2019	July 8, 2020
6	12	September 22, 2021	December 8, 2021
7	8	September 7, 2022	October 26, 2022

=== Season 1 (2015) ===
No. overall	No. in season	Title	Original release date	US viewers (millions)
1	1	"American Muscle"	October 7, 2015	0.916
Jay Leno visits old pal and muscle car aficionado Tim Allen; the first female Pro Stock champion; GM's top secret 1960s concept car; NASCAR legend Jimmie Johnson's souped-up classic Corvette.
2	2	"California Cruisin'"	October 14, 2015	0.689
Jay learns about car culture in California including a hangout with East L.A. hot rodders, a ride with a historic motorcycle club, and a look at the Petersen Automotive Museum's secret vault.
3	3	"The Driving Force"	October 21, 2015	0.556
Jay connects with some famous friends such as CJ Wilson, John Hennessey, and Laurence Fishburne to explore why people love cars.
4	4	"Off the Beaten Path"	November 4, 2015	0.561
Jay meets some less traditional motorists and their eclectic rides, explores harsh terrain with Amy Lerner, races comedian Jeff Dunham in an amphibious car and cheats death with out-of-the-box designer Baron Margo.
5	5	"Beasts of Burden"	November 11, 2015	0.514
Jay challenges an Abrams battle tank to a race at Fort Irwin, goes on a high-speed spin with the Secret Service, attempts to drive a fire truck through the winding streets of San Francisco and investigates a risky alternative to the postal truck.
6	6	"Competitive Nature"	November 18, 2015	0.499
Jay races Audi's newest driverless car, talks competition with legendary driver Mario Andretti and learns how a 1960s showdown created one of the greatest race cars of all time.
7	7	"Design of the Times"	November 25, 2015	0.480
Jay visits Keanu Reeves' passion project, learns what it takes to make and destroy movie cars, heads to the track to study aerodynamics and design his own car.
8	8	"The Cars of Tomorrow"	December 2, 2015	0.567
Jay connects with Oscar-winning director Francis Ford Coppola, meets young designers who are creating vehicles that can go over 3,000 miles per gallon, and drives a 3D printed car.

=== Season 2 (2016) ===
No. overall	No. in season	Title	Original release date	US viewers (millions)
9	1	"Supercars"	June 15, 2016	0.449
Jay Leno explores Robert Herjavec's iconic Countach, learns why Nick Cannon likes to drive slow in his Ferrari, gets an exclusive look at an ultra-powerful Koenigsegg mega-car, and tests comedian Alonzo Bodden's car knowledge.
10	2	"Crime Fighters"	June 22, 2016	0.484
Jay Leno practices high-speed maneuvers with the LAPD; playing superhero for the day in a Batmobile; talking Ghostbusters and Blues Brothers with gearhead Dan Aykroyd; taking an explosive ride in a military MRAP.
11	3	"Anything But Four Wheels"	June 29, 2016	0.469
Jay goes to two-wheel stunt driving school, snowmobiling with X-games champion Doug Henry, checks out the high-tech three-wheeled iRoad vehicles, and hits the road in the Hemi Under Glass.
12	4	"Anarchy on Wheels"	July 6, 2016	0.352
Jay joins a Mad-Max inspired car culture, dives head first into the risky world of side car racing, and entertains crowds in a massive monster truck.
13	5	"Essence of Cool"	July 13, 2016	0.453
Jay takes a motorcycle road trip with the rock legend Anthony Kiedis, learns how to drive like James Bond with stuntman Ben Collins, and cruises through the Hollywood Hills with his own personal icon, jazzman Herbie Hancock.
14	6	"Wolf in Sheep's Clothing"	July 13, 2016	0.581
Jay faces off against his old friend and rival, Tim Allen, in a Camry with 800 horsepower, meets a man who turns rust-buckets into race-worthy works of art, cruises with David Spade and goes head-to-head against a jet-powered ex-Mennonite.
15	7	"Love Stories"	November 9, 2016	0.518
Jay explores the deep emotional connection people have with their vehicles; Joe Biden's 1967 Corvette; Joe Biden faces Colin Powell in a drag race; Bill Goldberg's pick-up; camping with VW bus fanatic Gabriel "Fluffy" Iglesias.
16	8	"Original and Unrestored"	November 16, 2016	0.377
Unrestored classic cars; Jerry Seinfeld's Porsches; Patrick Dempsey; 1941 Cadillacs.
17	9	"Music and Cars"	November 23, 2016	0.488
Jay Leno rides in rock legend Sammy Hagar's "I Can't Drive 55" Ferrari, visits Brad Paisley's tour bus, plays dress up in the iconic Liberace Zimmer, and chauffeurs car lover and pop legend Kelly Rowland in a million-dollar vintage Bentley.
18	10	"Old School vs. New School"	November 30, 2016	0.383
Jay Leno puts Joey Logano into a '60s race car, talks Corvettes with Caitlyn and Kendall Jenner, explores autonomous driving in a Tesla and 1956 Firebird, and meets a high school team that designs a new type of solar race cars.
19	11	"Just Add Water"	December 7, 2016	0.431
Jay and comedian pal Jeff Dunham race the fastest amphibious cars on the market, then Jay hits the high seas in a massive Navy hovercraft, fights fire with a vintage steam truck, and drives a wet race course wearing a drunk-simulation suit.
20	12	"Space Age"	December 14, 2016	0.463
Jay heads to Edwards Airforce Base with astrophysicist Neil DeGrasse Tyson, then meets up with pop culture historian Charles Phoenix, drives the $2.5 billion Mars Rover, and challenges pal Tim Allen to a game of "Stump a Car Nerd."

=== Season 3 (2017–18) ===
No. overall	No. in season	Title	Original release date	US viewers (millions)
21	1	"Made In America"	June 28, 2017	0.441
Jay heads to President George W. Bush's ranch to ask all about his famous Ford pickup, challenges Wanda Sykes to a race in a minivan, takes a ride with Billy Gardell, and gets his feathers ruffled by Gabriel Iglesias' Smokey and the Bandit Trans-Am.
22	2	"Larger Than Life"	June 28, 2017	0.417
Jay heads to Las Vegas to cruise around with Brad Garrett, goes on an adventure in J.B. Smoove's boat-sized Lincoln, works up an appetite in a giant hot dog car, heads out on a training mission with the Marines and drives a VW bug.
23	3	"Losing Control"	July 5, 2017	0.398
Jay competes in a drifting race against his nemesis Tim Allen, learns the finer points of "mudding" in Georgia, slides over snowy slopes in a race against Katherine Legge, and participates in his first demolition derby.
24	4	"Victory Lane"	July 12, 2017	0.331
Jay challenges fellow comedian Alonzo Bodden to a semi-friendly dirt bike race, gets some pointers from IndyCar champion Scott Dixon, and hears the inspiring story of a champion racer who became the first quadriplegic with a driver's license.
25	5	"Outside the Box"	July 19, 2017	0.425
Dedicated to the vehicular rule-breakers; Jay cruises in a 1969 Pink Panthermobile and chats with legendary customizer Ed Newton; inside Jeff Dunham's wacky garage; giant art car made for Burning Man; Cadillac-turned-hot tub; car made from cannabis.
26	6	"Child at Heart"	July 26, 2017	0.466
Car lovers who never want to grow up; Michael Strahan and Josh Duhamel surprise a special little kid; four-story, motorized fire-breathing dinosaur; Pixar's John Lasseter takes Jay on a tour of his 85-acre playground; grumpy comedian Jeremy Hotz.
27	7	"Hand Made"	August 2, 2017	0.407
Jay takes a vintage belly tank racer out onto a dry lake bed, talks hand-crafted Bentleys with comedian Russell Peters, surprises an iconic Porsche customizer, and spends the day with a reformed bad boy who helps troubled youth.
28	8	"Keys To Happiness"	August 9, 2017	0.430
Jay meets actor Dax Shepard's true love, a 1994 Buick Roadmaster, learns to rally with adrenaline-junkie Bucky Lasek, delivers pizzas with Papa John, donates a customized car to a disabled veteran and learns how to manage road rage with a yogi.
29	9	"The Car My Father Drove"	August 16, 2017	0.381
Jay hangs out with Richard and Kyle Petty, heads to the Riverside County Fair to learn the art of tractor pulling, meets a girl who restored a Mustang and airplane with her dad and gets invited to a Shelby family reunion.
30	10	"The Next Generation"	August 23, 2017	0.368
Jay becomes the first customer to receive Ford's new GT, goes off-roading with comedian Alonzo Bodden, checks out a vehicle that can become anything you want on the big screen, and meets up with legendary newsman Ted Koppel.
31	11	"In Harm's Way"	January 4, 2018	0.389
Jay hangs out with Travis Pastrana; Jay meets someone who faces her fears for money: famous stunt driver Debbie Evans; Jay teaches Gilbert Gottfried to drive a new Ferrari; Jay talks saving lives and specialized vehicles with airport firefighters.
32	12	"Any Which Way But Gas"	January 11, 2018	0.452
Jay explores the most exciting alternatives to standard fuel; Jay meets up with Arnold Schwarzenegger to check out the Governator's G-Wagon and goes deep into rural California to revisit a time when burning wood could run cars.
33	13	"Closed Roads"	January 18, 2018	0.432
Jay meets famed driver Ben "The Stig" Collins to drive a 2018 Hyundai Kona, explores tanks and robots, climbs intense inclines in a Jeep Wrangler Prototype and competes against race car driver Bryce Menzies in a soapbox race.
34	14	"More Power"	January 25, 2018	0.466
Jay hits the drag strip with Dee Snider in the new Dodge Demon, heads to the largest Borax mine in North America to drive a two-story truck, gets an early look at the Bugatti Chiron with Jessi Combs and explores a brand-new electric sports car.
35	15	"Living the Dream"	February 1, 2018	0.414
Jay catches up with comedian Bill Burr in a 1965 Buick Riviera, checks out the Nissan GT Academy, where video gamers can compete to become actual race car drivers, and drives up the highest road on the East Coast in a vintage steam car.
36	16	"Getting Away"	February 8, 2018	0.293
Getting away; Jay teaches punk rocker Johnny Rotten how to drive for the first time; director Michael Mann shows Jay how 1930s gangsters escaped; filming a car chase; a family who models their Truckster after the "Vacation" films.

=== Season 4 (2018) ===
No. overall	No. in season	Title	Original release date	US viewers (millions)
37	1	"Movie Cars"	April 19, 2018	0.312
"Baby Driver" star Jamie Foxx reveals his driving skills; stunt driver Ben Collins re-creates the chase scene from "The Spy Who Loved Me"; original "Bullitt" Mustang; musician James Taylor reunites with the car from "Two Lane Blacktop."
38	2	"Over the Top"	April 26, 2018	0.238
Jay enlists Terry Crews to be a guest announcer; Jay meets up with chef and car collector Guy Fieri; he meets a man and his cat co-pilot in their modified Jaguar with a Lear-jet trailer; Jay attempts to drive an insane two-direction vehicle. Jay meets Gui Cavalcanti and his MegaBot fighting robot.
39	3	"The Motor City"	May 3, 2018	0.323
Jay explores the past, present and future of Detroit; Jay takes actor Tim Allen on a trip down memory lane; Jay test drives the newest Corvette; R&B singer Martha Reeves schools Jay on the history of Motown; Jay takes a ride in a "mutant vehicle."
40	4	"Down and Dirty"	May 10, 2018	0.298
Jay tries to learn desert orienteering with skateboarder Bucky Lasek; Jay puts a blue-collar twist on a luxury car race against comic Jeff Foxworthy; a training exercise with the Montrose Search and Rescue team; a prototype electric off-road vehicle.
41	5	"Rebels"	May 17, 2018	0.291
Comic Craig Ferguson teaches Jay how to be a rebel in a British mail delivery car; Jay talks about bootlegging with NASCAR team owner Ray Evernham; Jay checks out a radical hot rod Rolls-Royce and a Dodge Hellcat trapped in a Prius body.
42	6	"Cars of Sports Stars"	May 24, 2018	0.296
Jay goes head-to-head on the drag strip against former NFL quarterback Terry Bradshaw; Jay takes comic Billy Crystal for a drive in Muhammad Ali's old Alfa Romeo; Jay surprises golfer Bubba Watson with the KITT car from "Knight Rider."
43	7	"One of a Kind"	June 7, 2018	0.322
Jay takes a trip with comic Chris Hardwick in the DeLorean from "Back to the Future;" he drives one of the most dangerous cars ever made with Jalopnik writer Jason Torchinsky; Jay is treated to a ride in comic Jeff Dunham's "Hard Hat" car.
44	8	"Size Matters"	July 26, 2018	0.330
Jay Leno explores the tiniest cars and biggest machines; he crushes things in a tank with actor Arnold Schwarzenegger; Jay and his tallest friend, actor Brad Garrett, go for a ride in a dwarf replica car; micro cars; the new Hennessey truck.
45	9	"Rolling Sculpture"	August 2, 2018	0.312
Jay explores cars that are rolling works of art; Jay and TV show host Trevor Noah take a ride in an outrageous Lamborghini Aventador; Jay meets Chris Runge, a designer who crafts works of moving art; Jay talks to custom car designer Rick Dore.
46	10	"Hard Work Pays Off"	August 9, 2018	0.301
Jay meets up with some of the hardest working car people he knows, including movie director Tyler Perry, musician Richard Carpenter and race team owner Roger Penske, who rides in Rod Emory's meticulously crafted Outlaw Porsche.
47	11	"Prodigies"	August 16, 2018	0.300
Jay meets young car enthusiasts; a stunt driver goes head to head with her father; Jay visits a karting track; a youngster builds an electric car using spare parts; a teenager restores a vintage tractor; Jay meets the cutest kids in the car world.
48	12	"Origins"	August 23, 2018	0.325
Jay Leno explores how a love of cars begins; Mitt Romney's passion started with his dad, who was president of American Motors; "Weird Al" Yankovic has only ever loved one vehicle -- his first family car; Jay reminisces about Johnny Carson.
49	13	"Second Chances"	August 30, 2018	0.267
Chris Evans shows off his 1967 Camaro, a car so powerful it takes many tries to learn how to drive it; famed builder Bodie Stroud; Jay gives Adam Carolla another shot in a Porsche 935 racecar that was driven by Paul Newman.
50	14	"Limited Funds Unlimited Fun!"	September 6, 2018	0.308
Jay and comic Billy Gardell hit the road in Billy's new vintage 1969 Oldsmobile Cutlass convertible; Jay meets the creators of the Gambler 500; Jay hangs out with Donut Media's James Pumphrey, who shares his enthusiasm for the MR2.
51	15	"General Badassery"	September 13, 2018	0.346
Actor Josh Duhamel drives Jay's 1963 split-window Corvette, his all-time dream car; Chuck Zito introduces Jay to his heavily modified '57 Chevy called "The Beast from the East"; Jay meets an 81-year-old woman with an original Shelby 350.
52	16	"Going the Distance"	September 20, 2018	0.267
Rally driver Ken Block shows off his chops; Jay and blogger Matt Farah learn about racing at Dirt Fish rally school in Seattle; riders honor the first female African-American motorcyclist to cross the country; Airstream trailer; the Land Rover.

=== Season 5 (2019–20) ===
No. overall	No. in season	Title	Original release date	US viewers (millions)
53	1	"Tough Enough"	August 28, 2019	0.328
Jay showcases the world's toughest vehicles; he tests meteorologist Reed Timmer's storm-proof vehicle; Jay meets injured veterans who use high-speed racing as rehabilitation; he pushes an armored car to the limit; with comic Kevin Hart.
54	2	"Cult Classics"	September 4, 2019	0.345
Jay Leno asks what makes a car a cult classic; actor Charlie Sheen shows off the Chrysler Turbo Interceptor; music artist Billy Joel shares his collection of vintage motorcycles; Jay attempts to drive the Landmaster; AMC Pacer versus AMC Gremlin.
55	3	"Truly Unconventional"	September 11, 2019	0.300
Jay celebrates unconventional vehicles; comic Jeff Dunham races in a Seabreacher; Jay must choose which vehicle to drive in the 24 Hours of Lemons; actress Lea DeLaria drives a Vicious Mustang; inflatable DeLorean; lawnmower.
56	4	"Modern Icons"	September 18, 2019	N/A
Jay and actor Tim Allen debate which vehicles are the most iconic; singer Keith Urban shows off his Pagani, while actor Brad Garrett shows off his Aston Martin; race car driver Willy T. Ribbs tells stories about his Cadillac.
57	5	"Innovations and Breakthroughs"	September 25, 2019	N/A
Jay explores the latest developments and newest vehicles; comic Jim Jefferies shows off an electric Corvette; Jay takes a spin in the Phantom car; Jay puts a coin in a vending machine and out comes an electric drift car; souped-up minivan.
58	6	"Sky's the Limit"	October 2, 2019	N/A
Jay pays homage to vehicles influenced by the science of flight; he goes up in the air with actor John Travolta to discuss his fascination with airplanes and plane-influenced cars.
59	7	"Unsung Heroes"	October 9, 2019	N/A
Jay celebrates pit crews and stuntmen; Jay and TV personality Martha Stewart take a ride in her pristine Edsel wagon; Jay joins a NASCAR pit crew to assist driver Joey Logano during a race; he explores dangerous and under-appreciated automotive jobs.
60	8	"Built for Speed"	October 16, 2019	N/A
Jay has a need for speed as he talks race rivalries with his old friend Matt Damon, who stars as Carroll Shelby in the upcoming film Ford vs. Ferrari; Jay tries the all-American GT500; Avril Lavigne becomes the newest student at Jay's Driving School.
61	9	"Dare to Dream"	May 20, 2020	N/A
Jay hits to road to meet people who've had the courage to throw caution to the wind and go for it; he surprises country superstar Blake Shelton by taking him for a spin in a vintage pick-up truck with a royal connection.
62	10	"Risk vs. Reward"	May 27, 2020	N/A
Jay learns the automotive world is not for the risk averse; maverick tech-entrepreneur Elon Musk; comic Rob Riggle; Jay flies a mission on a massive firefighting helicopter and meets a blind race car driver determined to drive 200mph unassisted.
63	11	"Dare to be Different"	June 3, 2020	N/A
Jay meets people who seek new, different, and often ridiculous automotive experiences; he takes funnyman Brad Garrett car shopping to find his perfect automotive match; Jay and comedian Bill Burr go for a spin in Bill's dream sleeper.
64	12	"Even Tougher"	June 10, 2020	N/A
Jay takes Matt LeBlanc into the hills in one of the first off-road vehicles of all time; comic Jeff Dunham is challenged to another aquatic battle; tough guy actor Danny Trejo shows off his collection of iconic rides and threatens Jay's dry cleaner.
65	13	"In Pursuit of Perfection"	June 17, 2020	N/A
Jay checks out vehicles that come close to being perfect; Jon Hamm is treated to a drive down memory lane; Jay and Fabio talk Italian-style while cruising in Fabio's Lamborghini; Jay tries to stump Robert Herjavec.
66	14	"Road Trip"	June 24, 2020	N/A
The ideal road trip has three elements: the right vehicle, a good destination and the perfect companion.
67	15	"You Are What You Drive"	July 1, 2020	N/A
Jay takes a drive with ZZ Top frontman Billy Gibbons in one of his newest, most rock 'n' roll hot rods.
68	16	"All Play and No Work"	July 8, 2020	N/A
Some cars are only meant for fun; former "Dirty Jobs" host Mike Rowe drives the actual car from "The Rockford Files"; Jay and off-road badass Jolene Van Vugt go to the desert to test out Polaris' RZR; competition with comedian Alonzo Bodden.

=== Compilation (2020) ===
No.	Title	Original release date	US viewers (millions)
1	"Off Road Adventures: Down and Dirty"	April 15, 2020	N/A
Jay looks back at a classic off-roading episode. In this episode, Jay learns desert orienteering with skateboarder Bucky Lasek, puts a blue-collar twist on a luxury car race with Jeff Foxworthy and goes on a training exercise with Montrose Search and Rescue.
2	"Off Road Adventures: Losing Control"	April 22, 2020	N/A
Jay looks back at another classic episode. In this show, Jay competes in a drifting race against his nemesis Tim Allen, learns the finer points of "mudding" in Georgia, slides over snowy slopes in a race against pro-racer Katherine Legge and compere in his first - and last - demolition derby.
3	"Off Road Adventures: Going the Distance"	April 29, 2020	N/A
Jay looks back at another classic off-roading episode of Jay Leno's Garage. In this episode Ken Block shows off his rally-racing chops and takes Jay for a ride in his outrageous Group B car. Jay discovers more about racing at the Dirt Fish rally school in Seattle and he learns all about the history of the iconic Land Rover.
4	"Off Road Adventures: Closed Roads"	May 6, 2020	N/A
Jay looks back at another classic episode of Jay Leno's Garage. In this episode, Race-car driver Ben "the Stig" Collins helps Jay push a Hyundai Kona to its limits on a high-impact test track. He spotlights some vehicles that are too powerful for the average road, including revolutionary tanks and robots at Howe & Howe Technologies and competes against off-road racer Bryce Menzies in a wacky soapbox race.
5	"Top Ten Most Hair-Raising Moments"	May 13, 2020	N/A
Jay counts down his craziest and most dangerous automotive experiences on the show; highlights include death-defying stunt driving with Jamie Foxx, off-road madness with Kevin Hart, and tank driving with Arnold Schwarzenegger.
6	"Top Ten Most Outrageous Rides"	July 15, 2020	N/A
Jay counts down his top 10 favorite outrageous vehicles from "Jay Leno's Garage"; Jay explores the wide world of wild rides, from Charlie Sheen's cult classic Wraith car to a DeLorean hovercraft to Elon Musk's groundbreaking Cybertruck.
7	"Top Ten Military & Service Vehicles"	September 2, 2020	N/A
Jay puts out a raging fire at an airport; landing a U-2 aircraft; testing out artillery on an Abrams tank; piloting a hovercraft.
8	"America's Toughest: Tough Enough"	September 9, 2020	N/A
Jay looks back at a classic episode celebrating tough American cars and people; Kevin Hart on one of the most outrageous off-road vehicles in the world; injured veterans who use high-speed racing as rehabilitation.
9	"America's Toughest: Made In America"	September 16, 2020	N/A
Jay looks back at a classic episode celebrating tough American cars and people; Jay heads to President George W. Bush's ranch to ask all about his famous Ford pickup, challenges Wanda Sykes to a race for the ages, and takes a ride with Billy Gardell.
10	"America's Toughest: In Harm's Way"	September 23, 2020	N/A
Jay Leno explores the various reasons people may put themselves and their vehicles in harm's way; he hangs out with people who like danger just for the thrill, like Travis Pastrana and famous stunt driver Debbie Evans.
11	"America's Toughest: Unsung Heroes"	September 30, 2020	N/A
Jay jumps headfirst into some of the most dangerous and underappreciated automotive jobs; Martha Stewart shows off Edsel "Son-of-Henry" Ford's Maine estate, and they take a ride in her pristine Edsel wagon.
12	"Top Ten: Most Beautiful Rides"	October 7, 2020	N/A
Jay reviews his top 10 beautiful cars.

=== Season 6 (2021) ===
No. overall	No. in season	Title	Original release date	US viewers (millions)
69	1	"Big Dreams"	September 22, 2021	N/A
Jay Leno kicks Drew Carey's soccer dreams into high gear; James Corden tries to steal Jay's Jag; Jay and Gary Sinise salute a decorated veteran who's helping other vets achieve their dreams; Tammy Pescatelli may be the first to crash car.
70	2	"Don't Blink"	September 29, 2021	N/A
Jay and Tim Allen go helmet to helmet in an otherworldly shuttle-van Space Race.
71	3	"Versitility"	October 6, 2021	N/A
Jay makes the most of things with multitaskers; Mark Cuban sinks his teeth into a classic Cadillac El Dorado convertible.
72	4	"The Great Outdoors"	October 13, 2021	N/A
Jay finds out if he can win his cupcakes and eat them too, while off-road racing American Idol Kelly Clarkson in the mother of all minivans; Jay gets an exclusive first look at the ultimate eco-friendly off-roader: the all-new, all-electric Hummer.
73	5	"True Grit"	October 20, 2021	N/A
Get ready to roll up sleeves and Gritter Done; Jay will take the hilarious Tiffany Haddish on the ride of her automotive life.
74	6	"Resto: Mods"	October 27, 2021	N/A
What's old is sort of new again; Jay meets up with the one and only Cedric the Entertainer, who can't get enough of Barry White's 1977 Stutz Blackhawk 6.
75	7	"Punch It"	November 3, 2021	N/A
Jay takes boxing royalty Sugar Ray Leonard for a stroll down memory lane, before letting him take his own swing at a regal Rolls-Royce Corniche; he trades jabs with Goodfella and Sinatra fanboy Ray Liotta in a 1961 Dual Ghia.
76	8	"Limited Edition"	November 10, 2021	N/A
Jay and talk-show phenom Trevor Noah test-drive the lightning-fast, all-new, all-electric Mercedes EQS.
77	9	"Bigger and Badder"	November 17, 2021	N/A
Rapper Rick Ross brings both the heat and smoke in a Hellcat burnout challenge; Fluffy, aka Gabriel Iglesias, and Jay attempt to move heaven and Earth during a CrossFit challenge in a colossal pair of Caterpillar excavators.
78	10	"Thrill Rides"	November 24, 2021	N/A
Jay attempts to make all of Ashton Kutcher's car dreams come true; Jay needs the police after Marie Osmond tries to make off with one of Ford's new 2021 Mustang Mach 1's.
79	11	"Survival"	December 1, 2021	N/A
Action star Frank Grillo shows Jay the tricks of the action trade in the military-grade infantry support vehicle; Jay tries to give self-proclaimed servant of self-harm, Steve-O, a few more souvenir scars during a thrilling tsunami survival test.
80	12	"Tribute"	December 8, 2021	N/A
Jay rides a mechanical bull with country icon Dwight Yoakam before they cut loose in a couple of killer Corvettes; Jay views a replica of 007's original Aston Martin DB5; Jay and Paul Reiser ride a pair of Johnny Carson's Corvette-powered swan boats.

=== Season 7 (2022) ===
No. overall	No. in season	Title	Original release date	US viewers (millions)
81	1	"Premiere Cars"	September 7, 2022	N/A
Brie Larson, Captain Marvel herself, shows off the newly-released Nissan Z and teaches Jay how to fly.
82	2	"Fast Living"	September 14, 2022	N/A
Jay joins musician Post Malone in an explosive new hypercar, the F5 Venom, built to be the fastest production car on Earth.
83	3	"Elon Musk: Mars Legacy"	September 21, 2022	N/A
Billionaire entrepreneur Elon Musk invites Jay to Texas where he gives an exclusive personal tour of his revolutionary rocket factory, SpaceX.
84	4	"The Bigger The Better"	September 28, 2022	N/A
This show proves that bigger really is better! First, Jay and Tim Allen take a wild ride through the history of trucks as told by two morons. And then, it doesn't get much bigger than everyone's favorite comedian, Gabriel Fluffy Iglesias, who takes Jay on an exclusive drive in the new electric VW Buzz. Jay has a dirty job for our friend Mike Rowe, and finally, Jay gets a lesson on the ups, and kidney-pummeling downs, of driving a Monster Jam truck!
85	5	"Jamie Lee Curtis' Automotive Life"	October 5, 2022	N/A
Hollywood legend Jamie Lee Curtis takes Jay though her automotive history; comedian Jeff Dunham gets roasted at the firefighter training grounds; actor Diego Boneta takes a literal spin on a watery skid plate at the Porsche Experience.
86	6	"Classic vs Cutting Edge"	October 12, 2022	N/A
Jay takes a wild cruise down memory lane with musician Pitbull in a pristine 1956 Packard and meets up with Ford CEO Jim Farley to take an exclusive drive in the new F-150 Lightning pickup. Jay then convinces Mandalorean star Katee Sackhoff to exchange her classic Harley for the new electric Livewire motorcycle! And finally, Jay baffles podcaster Spike Feresten in everyone's favorite gameshow-Stump a Car Nerd!
87	7	"Visionaries"	October 19, 2022	N/A
Kelly Clarkson challenges Jay to a manure-fueled tractor race in a state of the art visionary vehicle; an exclusive off-road drive in the newest Ford Bronco Raptor with Titus Welliver; Jay takes James Marsden on a trip through his automotive past.
88	8	"POTUS and the Next Gen Hot Rods"	October 26, 2022	N/A
Jay joins President Joe Biden at the secret service training ground to discuss hot-rodding and the future of electric cars; Jim Jefferies and play an action-packed game of car soccer; journalist Alanis King goes against Jay in "Stump a Car Nerd!"

== Broadcast ==
Internationally, the series premiered in Australia on Discovery Turbo on February 1, 2016 and in the UK on Dave on August 28, 2016.

In Mexico, the first three seasons are available for streaming on Amazon Prime Video.
