= 568 Group =

Consortium of American universities and colleges practicing need-blind admissions

The 568 Presidents Group was a consortium of American universities and colleges practicing need-blind admissions. The group was founded in 1998 in response to section 568 of the Improving America's Schools Act of 1994. It was dissolved effective November 4, 2022 while it was being sued.

== History ==
In response to several prestigious colleges and universities holding "Overlap Meetings" to set similar tuition and financial aid levels, the Justice Department began an antitrust investigation in 1989 and in 1991 filed a Sherman Antitrust Act suit against 57 colleges and universities. While the Ivy League institutions settled, MIT contested the charges on the grounds that the practice was not anticompetitive because it prevented bidding wars over promising students from consuming funds for need-based scholarships and ensured the availability of aid for the greatest number of students. MIT ultimately prevailed when the Justice Department settled the case in 1994.

In 1994, Congress passed the Improving America's Schools Act. Section 568 of this Act expands upon the issues in the MIT settlement. Section 568 states that is not unlawful under the antitrust laws for two or more need-blind institutions to agree or attempt to agree:

1. to award financial aid only on the basis of need;
2. to use common principles of analysis for determining need;
3. to use a common aid application form; and
4. to engage in a one-time exchange of certain pre-award data of commonly admitted financial aid students.

The amendment specifically prohibits the sharing of any information on the amount or terms of any prospective, individual aid award and makes clear that the exemption does not apply to the awarding of federal financial aid.

== Membership ==
The following institutions were at one point members of the 568 group:

- Amherst College
- Boston College
- Brown University
- California Institute of Technology
- Claremont McKenna College
- College of the Holy Cross
- Columbia University
- Cornell University
- Dartmouth College
- Davidson College
- Duke University
- Emory University
- Georgetown University
- Grinnell College
- Haverford College
- Johns Hopkins University
- Massachusetts Institute of Technology
- Middlebury College
- Northwestern University
- Pomona College
- Rice University
- St. John's College
- Swarthmore College
- University of Chicago
- University of Notre Dame
- University of Pennsylvania
- Vanderbilt University
- Wellesley College
- Williams College
- Yale University

== Member University Settlements ==
These institutions have settled the 2022 price fixing class action lawsuit for the following amounts:

- Brown University - $19.5MM
- California Institute of Technology - $16.7MM
- Columbia University - $24MM
- Dartmouth College - $33.75MM
- Duke University - $24MM
- Emory University - $18.5MM
- Johns Hopkins University - $18.5MM
- Northwestern University - $43.5MM
- Rice University - $33.75MM
- University of Chicago - $13MM
- Vanderbilt University - $55MM
- Yale University - $18.5MM
