= Richard Miller (engineer) =

American academic administrator

1st President of Olin College of Engineering
- In office 1999 – June 30, 2020

Personal details
- Born: Richard Keith Miller Fresno, California, U.S.
- Spouse: Beth Miller
- Education: University of California, Davis (BS); Massachusetts Institute of Technology (MS); California Institute of Technology (PhD)
- Scientific career
- Awards: Bernard M. Gordon Prize (2013)
- Fields: Mechanical engineering
- Institutions: University of California, Santa Barbara; University of Southern California; University of Iowa; Olin College of Engineering
- Thesis: The Steady-State Response of Multidegree-of-Freedom Systems with a Spatially Localized Nonlinearity (1976)
- Doctoral advisor: Wilfred D. Iwan

Richard Keith Miller is an American engineer who was the founding president of Olin College since 1999. He stepped down from his role as president on June 30, 2020. His successor will be Gilda Barabino, dean of Grove School of Engineering. Previously, Miller was dean of the College of Engineering and a professor at the University of Iowa. Miller received a B.S. in aerospace engineering in 1971 from the University of California, Davis and an M.S. degree in mechanical engineering from the Massachusetts Institute of Technology in 1972. In 1976, he received a Ph.D. in applied mechanics from the California Institute of Technology.

In 2012, Miller was elected a member of the National Academy of Engineering for establishing a new paradigm for undergraduate engineering education and establishment of Olin College.
