= Jason Torchinsky =

American automotive journalist, author, graphic artist, and comedian

Jason Torchinsky is an American author, comedian, graphic designer, art director and automotive journalist, widely known as co-founder and Chief Creative Officer at The Autopian, an automotive enthusiast website, and as a prolific former Senior Editor at Jalopnik.

He performed with the sketch-comedy troupe the Van Gogh-Goghs. He has led classes for Minneapolis' Walker Art Center highlighting key aspects of automotive engineering, physics and mechanics — exclusively for children.

Torchinsky was later senior editor at Jalopnik and producer for Jay Leno's Garage. In 2022, he and David Tracy cofounded the automotive website The Autopian.

== Background ==
Torchinsky grew up in Greensboro, North Carolina, the son of Ashkenazi Jews, Sylvia and William Torchinsky (1931–2005), the latter an ex-marine and Judo instructor who worked with Ciba-Geigy, the Swiss chemical company.

He has an older sister, Amy, and as a teenager, he worked at a local computer store, the Byte Shop. He would later write the hilarious if painful story of bailing out his parents on murder charges, in 1987, at age 16. His parents were subsequently cleared of all charges.

He later graduated from the University of North Carolina (UNC) in the 1990s with a degree in art history. His personal cars have included a Reliant Scimitar, Nissan Pao, Volkswagen Beetle, Yugo, — and at the time the least expensive car importable to the United States, a $900 Changli.

As former long-time resident of Los Angeles, CA, Torchinsky lives in Chapel Hill.

== Early writing and comedy ==
Torchinsky is a native of Greensboro, North Carolina. He attended Grimsley High School and graduated from the University of North Carolina at Chapel Hill, where he studied art history.

By 1996, Torchinsky was working as a graphic artist for Fringe Multimedia, a Chapel Hill company that designed CD-ROM games and other computer software. He also contributed humor pieces to Stay Free, a Chapel Hill magazine founded and edited by Carrie McLaren. His essay “Slouching on the Shoulders of Giants: Why It’s Okay That Your Job Sucks” first appeared in Stay Free, and an excerpt was later published in Harper's.

Torchinsky performed with the six-member sketch-comedy group the Van Gogh-Goghs, originally known as the Sore Horsemen of the Apocalypse. The group gave its first performance in April 1992. Its members primarily performed scripted sketches without cue cards, leaving room for ad-libbing, and said they preferred sketch comedy to improvisation. Before traveling to Austin in 1996, the group reported that it had received special approval to present sketch comedy at an improvisation festival.

In April 1996, the Van Gogh-Goghs appeared at the inaugural Big Stinkin' International Improv & Sketch Comedy Festival in Austin, Texas. Advance coverage said the group planned to present 12 sketches during a 45-minute set at Esther's Pool. The group's later account described the completed show and identified Torchinsky among the performers. At the fourth festival in 1999, Torchinsky appeared on a panel titled “Comedy and Technology”; the festival program described him as a web graphic artist. Torchinsky had previously opened for George Carlin at UNC in 1993.

== Automotive journalism and media ==
Torchinsky worked as a senior editor at Jalopnik, where his writing focused on unusual vehicles, automotive history, and car culture. He also served as a producer for the CNBC television series Jay Leno's Garage and hosted the Jalopnik video series Jason Drives, which featured unusual and historic vehicles.

In April 2022, Torchinsky and fellow former G/O Media writer David Tracy launched The Autopian, an automotive news and enthusiast website. Torchinsky continued writing for the publication as a co-founder.

== Books ==
In 2009, Torchinsky and Carrie McLaren co-authored Ad Nauseam: A Survivor's Guide to American Consumer Culture, a collection about advertising, marketing, and consumer culture.

Torchinsky's 2019 book Robot, Take the Wheel: The Road to Autonomous Cars and the Lost Art of Driving examines the history and possible social effects of autonomous vehicles, including the potential loss of driving as a skill and recreational activity. The News & Observer described the book as “rigorously researched and surprisingly funny” and praised its combination of automotive history, industry analysis, and humor. Tony Borroz of Automoblog called it an “entertaining yet serious examination” of automation, while Jaclyn Trop of Book and Film Globe characterized it as a “well-considered thought experiment” about the future of autonomous vehicles.
