= Etosha Cave =

American mechanical engineer

Etosha R. Cave
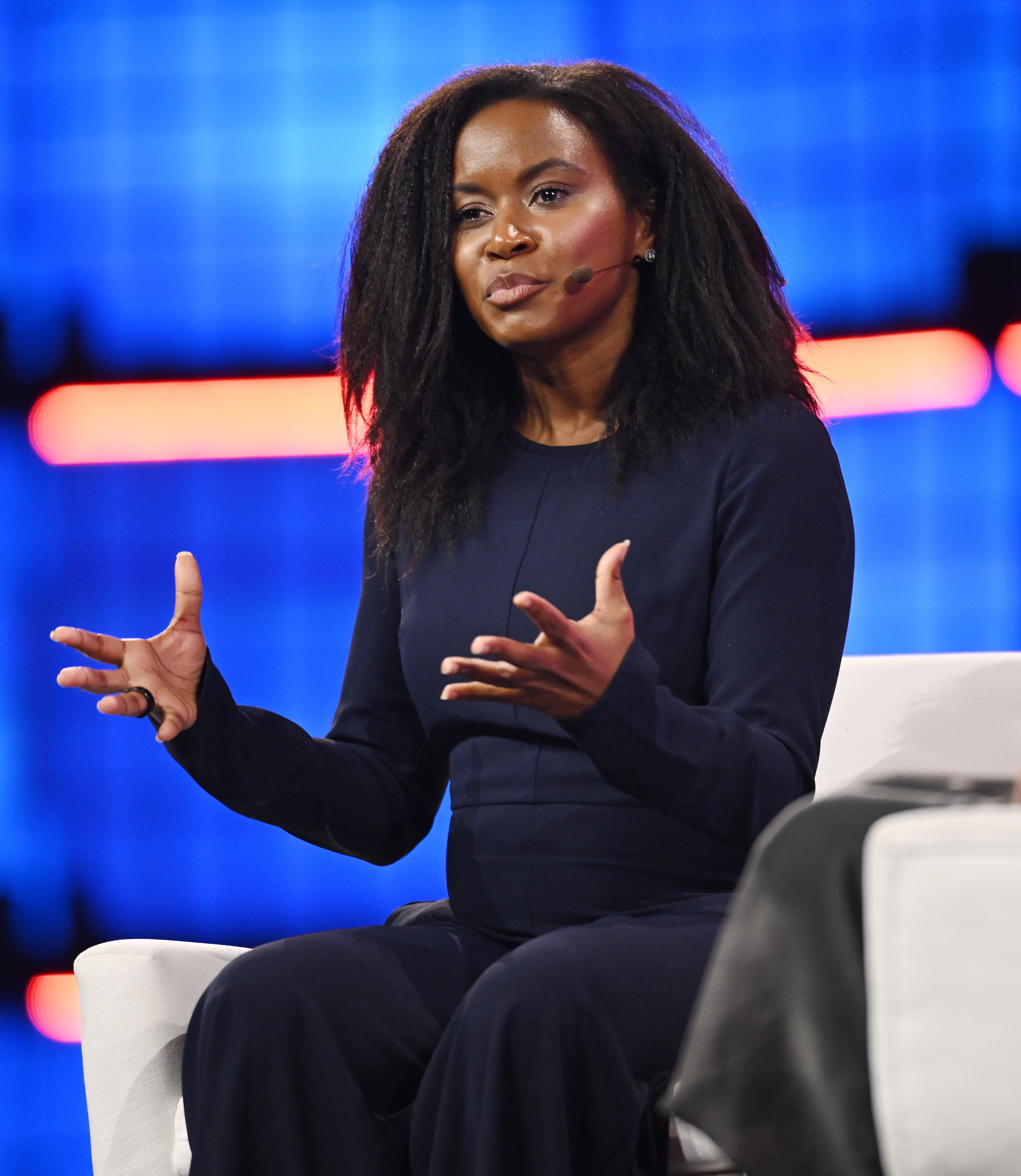
- Cave at the 2024 Web Summit
- Born: Houston, Texas, U.S.
- Education: Olin College; Stanford University
- Scientific career
- Workplaces: Twelve, Lawrence Berkeley National Laboratory

Etosha R. Cave is an American mechanical engineer based in Berkeley, California. She is the co-founder and Chief Scientific Officer of Twelve, a startup that recycles carbon dioxide.

== Early life and education ==
Cave grew up in Houston, Texas, where she became interested in recycling oil and gas. During high school she joined the National Society of Black Engineers (NSBE). She studied at Olin College, and was in the first graduating year in 2006. She held a NSBE Scholarship. After graduating, she worked at the McMurdo Station, where she serviced HVAC systems and tested open path laser diode spectrometer for future NASA Rover Mission. Eventually Cave returned to her studies, and started a doctoral program at Stanford University working under the supervision of Thomas F. Jaramillo. During her PhD she worked on electrochemical approaches that could be used to convert carbon dioxide and water into useful plastics and household cleaners. She built a gas analysis system that could determine the composition of electrochemical reactions in realtime and earned her PhD in 2015.

== Research and career ==
While at Stanford University, Cave co-founded Twelve, a startup that uses metal catalysts to recycle carbon dioxide. At first, Twelve struggled to raise money from the venture capitalists in Silicon Valley. Today Twelve is based at the Lawrence Berkeley National Laboratory, and has secured several academic partnerships including funding from the National Science Foundation and I-Corps program.

Cave ultimately hopes that they will be able to make diesel fuel from recycled carbon dioxide and water. Cave discussed the idea at TEDx Stanford, where she explained the recycled carbon dioxide could reduce our carbon footprint as well as supporting future space travel. Twelve was awarded the Forbes magazine Change the World Award and was selected for the Advanced Manufacturing Office Cyclotron Road program in 2016. She was a finalist for the Carbon Xprize in 2018.

=== Awards and honours ===
Her awards and honours include;

- 2016 Echoing Green Fellow
- 2017 7x7's Hot 20 Perennial Bay Area Innovators
- 2017 Smithsonian Institution Innovators to Watch
- 2018 Grist Top 508
- 2018 Vanity Fair 26 Women of Color Diversifying Entrepreneurship in Silicon Valley, Media, and Beyond

She has spoken at the Aspen Ideas Festival and been part of Science Foo Camp. She is a member of the American Institute of Chemical Engineers. Cave is a member of the advisory board of the Berkeley Startup Cluster.
