= Need-blind admission =

College admission policy

In the United States, need-blind admission refers to a college admission policy that does not take into account an applicant's financial status when deciding whether to accept them. This approach typically results in a higher percentage of accepted students who require financial assistance and requires the institution to have a substantial endowment or other funding sources to support the policy. Institutions that participated in an antitrust exemption granted by Congress were required by law to be need-blind until September 30, 2022.

Many colleges and universities cannot provide enough financial aid to cover all admitted students. Some institutions are not need-blind, while others may practice need-blind admissions, but cannot provide sufficient aid. Additionally, some schools that use need-blind admissions for domestic first-year students may not extend that policy to international or transfer students. Need-blind schools tend to be selective, due to the large number of applications they receive.

Each institution has its own definition of meeting the full demonstrated need. Some schools meet this need through grants and/or merit or talent scholarships alone, while others may include loans and work-study programs. As a result, a student's financial aid package can differ greatly between schools that claim to meet full demonstrated need.

== Need-blind for both U.S. and international students ==
Ten U.S. higher education institutions are need-blind towards all applicants. These institutions meet full demonstrated need for all applicants, including international students:

- Amherst College,
- Bowdoin College,
- Brown University,
- Dartmouth College,
- Harvard University,
- Massachusetts Institute of Technology,
- Princeton University,
- University of Notre Dame,
- Washington and Lee University,
- Yale University.

== Need-blind for resident applicants ==
A number of U.S. institutions of higher learning both offer need-blind admissions, and meet the full demonstrated need for all students, but are need-aware when it comes to international student admissions. However, all admitted students will have their demonstrated need met, although in some colleges, primarily public colleges, such aid may only be offered for students who either require financial aid or are under specific geographical demographics. For instance, College of William & Mary and University of Michigan are public research universities that meet the full need of qualifying in-state students (residents of Virginia and Michigan, respectively) but don't meet the full need of out-of-state or international students. The following schools fall into this category:

- Antioch College (only students who qualify for the Pell Grant have the full need met)
- Babson College (need-blind for Canadian students as well)
- Barnard College (need-aware for transfer students)
- Berea College (tuition-free for all students; need-based aid, family EFC, and work-study will cover other costs)
- Boston College
- California Institute of Technology
- Carnegie Mellon University
- Claremont McKenna College
- College of William & Mary (only in-state students have the full need met; out-of-state students get only up to 25% of the cost covered)
- Columbia University (only Columbia College and Columbia School of Engineering students have the full need met; General Studies students are not guaranteed aid)
- Cornell University
- Davidson College
- Denison University
- Duke University
- Elon University (Odyssey Scholars only)
- Georgetown University (need-blind for all students but doesn't guarantee meeting full need for international students)
- Georgia Institute of Technology (typically, only low-income in-state students have the full need met; entering freshmen from specific counties of South Carolina, Florida, North Carolina, or Tennessee with SAT scores higher than 1500 may be interviewed for the Godbold Family Foundation Scholarship, which would cover 100% of their financial need)
- Grinnell College
- Hamilton College (need-aware for transfer students)
- Harvey Mudd College
- Johns Hopkins University
- Lehigh University (need-aware for waitlisted students)
- List College
- Middlebury College (need-aware for transfer students)
- Northwestern University (does not offer financial aid to international transfer applicants who are not U.S. citizens or eligible non-citizens)
- New York University
- Olin College
- Pomona College
- Purdue University (in-state students below an income level additionally qualify for the 21st Century Scholarship, which covers up to full tuition)
- Rice University
- Santa Clara University (only first-year students receiving Cal Grants or those who graduated from the national Cristo Rey Network high schools have the full need met)
- Soka University of America
- Stanford University
- Swarthmore College
- Tulane University (only in-state first-year students below an income threshold have the full need met)
- University of California, Los Angeles (only in-state students have the full need met; out-of-state students don't receive financial aid)
- University of Chicago
- University of Delaware (only in-state students have the full need met)
- University of Florida (only in-state students have the full need met)
- University of Georgia (through HOPE and other scholarships)
- University of Michigan (need-blind for in-state students only; only in-state students have the full need met)
- University of North Carolina at Chapel Hill
- University of Pennsylvania (need-blind for Mexican and Canadian students as well)
- University of Richmond (need-aware for transfer students)
- University of Southern California
- University of Virginia
- University of Wisconsin–Madison (only in-state students who qualify for the Pell Grant have the full need met)
- Vanderbilt University (need-aware for waitlisted students)
- Vassar College (need-aware for transfer students)
- Washington University in St. Louis (need-aware for transfer students)
- Wellesley College
- Whitman College
- Williams College

== Need-aware schools that meet needs of admitted students ==
Many reputable institutions that once championed need-blind policies have modified their policies due to rising costs as well as subpar endowment returns. Such institutions include prestigious colleges that do not offer merit-based aid but promise to meet 100% of financial need (mostly through grants). These stated institutions refer to themselves as "need-aware" or "need-sensitive," with policies that detract from their ability to admit and educate all qualified candidates but allow them to meet the full need of all admitted students who qualify for financial aid (many institutions extend this policy to all students).

For instance, at Macalester College, Mount Holyoke College and Smith College, at least 95% of students are admitted without financial need being a factor, but a slim percentage, generally students who are waitlisted or who have borderline qualifications, are reviewed in consideration of the college's projected financial resources. All three colleges grant all admitted students financial aid packages meeting 100% of need. At Wesleyan University, attempted shifts to a "need-aware" admission policy have resulted in protests by the school's student body.

Some institutions only meet the full need for students who are domestic US residents and/or are eligible for US federal financial aid, as proven by the applicant's FAFSA and CSS profile. A few only meet the full need of students under specific demographics who are considered "economically disadvantaged" and may not be guaranteed to meet the full need of other students. Do note that some colleges don't state their financial aid admissions policy, so they're sorted into the need-aware category. The following schools fall into this category:

- Alma College (Detroit high school students only)
- American University (may not meet full need for transfer students)
- Augustana College (Illinois)
- Bard College (only for historically economically disadvantaged in-state first-year students)
- Bates College
- Boston University (may not meet full need for international students)
- Bryn Mawr College
- California State University, Long Beach
- Carleton College
- Case Western Reserve University
- Centre College
- Colby College
- Colgate University
- College of the Holy Cross
- Colorado College
- Connecticut College
- DePauw University (in-state students seeking financial aid only)
- Dickinson College
- Emory University
- Franklin and Marshall College
- George Washington University (lower-income first-year students of the District of Columbia who qualify for the D.C. Tuition Assistance Grant only)
- Gettysburg College (select academically excelling, underrepresented minority, first-generation, first-year students only as part of the Gettysburg College STEM Scholars program)
- Haverford College
- Hendrix College (3.6 GPA and an ACT score of 26 or higher or an SAT score of 1230 or higher required)
- Hobart and William Smith Colleges (early decision applicants only)
- Kenyon College
- Lafayette College
- Lawrence University (Currently meets demonstrated need for students of Wisconsin and Illinois for Fall 2023 onward; possibly aims to soon extend a full need policy to all students)
- Macalester College
- Mount Holyoke College
- National University of Natural Medicine
- Northeastern University (may not meet full need for international students)
- Oberlin College
- Occidental College
- Ohio State University (only in-state students who qualify for the Pell Grant have the full need met)
- Ohio Wesleyan University (Charles Thomas Scholars only)
- Pitzer College
- Reed College
- Saint Joseph's University (select underrepresented students only as part of the STEM^2 Scholarship Program)
- Sewanee: The University of the South
- Scripps College
- Skidmore College
- Smith College
- St. Olaf College
- Thomas Aquinas College
- Stonehill College (Cathedral High School (Boston) graduates only)
- Trinity College
- Trinity University (only for San Antonio Independent School District students)
- Tufts University
- Union College
- University of Miami
- University of Pittsburgh (Pittsburgh public high school valedictorians and salutatorians as part of the Pittsburgh Public Scholars program only)
- University of Puget Sound (Tacoma public high school students only)
- University of Rochester
- Washington & Jefferson College (only in-state students who are eligible for the Pennsylvania State Grant, and have a 3.7+ GPA plus an SAT score of 1200 or an ACT score of 27)
- Wesleyan University
- Worcester Polytechnic Institute (Worcester public high school students eligible for the Pell Grant as part of the Great Minds/Compass Scholars Program only)

== Need-blind for residents, but do not guarantee to meet needs of admitted students ==
Some schools have a need-blind admissions policy but do not guarantee to meet the full demonstrated financial need of the students they admit. The following schools fall under this category:

- Baylor University (meets 65% of need on average)
- Bucknell University (meets 91% of need on average)
- Cooper Union (all admitted students receive a half-tuition scholarship)
- Fordham University
- Hampshire College
- Hillsdale College
- Ithaca College
- Providence College
- Saint Louis University
- Salem College
- Southern Methodist University (meets 85% of need on average)
- St. John's College (Annapolis/Santa Fe)
- St. John's University
- St. Lawrence University
- Syracuse University (meets 93% of need on average)
- Texas Christian University (meets 66% of need on average)
- Juilliard School
- University of San Diego (meets 71% of need on average)

== Need-aware and do not guarantee meeting needs ==
The following institutions are need-aware and aren't guaranteed to meet the full need of the students they admit in any capacity:

- Abilene Christian University
- Agnes Scott College
- Allegheny College
- Auburn University
- Beloit College
- Bennington College
- Bentley University
- Berklee College of Music
- Berry College
- Bradley University
- The Catholic University of America
- Clark University
- Clemson University
- College of Wooster
- Creighton University
- DePaul University
- Drexel University
- Earlham College
- Emerson College
- Fairfield University
- Furman University
- Hampton University
- Hofstra University
- Howard University
- Johnson & Wales University
- Knox College
- Lewis & Clark College
- Loma Linda University
- Loyola Marymount University
- Loyola University New Orleans
- Loyola University Chicago
- Marquette University
- The New School
- Pepperdine University
- Providence College
- Quinnipiac University
- Rensselaer Polytechnic Institute
- Rhode Island School of Design
- Rhodes College (meets 93% of need on average)
- Rochester Institute of Technology
- Rollins College
- Sarah Lawrence College
- Seton Hall University
- Southwestern University
- Spelman College
- University of Dayton
- University of Denver
- University of San Francisco
- University of California, San Diego
- University of St. Thomas
- University of Tulsa
- Villanova University (plans on meeting full demonstrated need by 2030)
- Wabash College
- Wheaton College
- Willamette University
- Wofford College

== Non-U.S. institutions that are need-blind for some or all applicants ==
- Georgetown University in Qatar
- Yale-NUS College, Singapore (formerly)
- New York University Abu Dhabi, United Arab Emirates

== See also ==
- 568 Group, an association of colleges practicing need-blind admission
- College admissions in the United States
- Transfer admissions in the United States
