= Mecha =

Humanoid walking vehicles

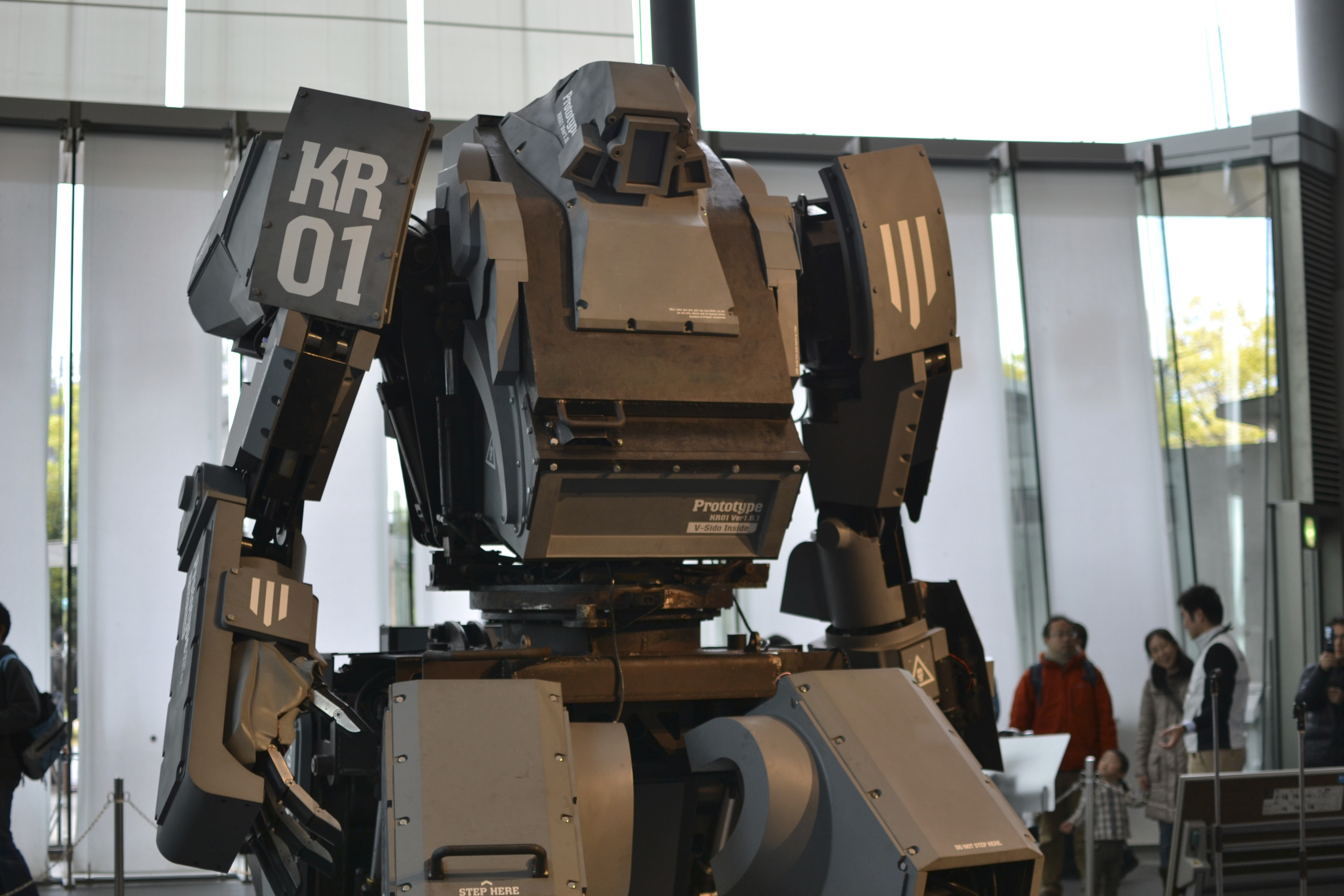
Kuratas, a mecha made by Suidobashi Heavy Industry at the Maker Faire Tokyo (2012)

In science fiction, mecha (Japanese: メカ, Hepburn: meka) or mechs are giant robots or machines, either depicted as piloted or sentient and are typically humanoid walking vehicles. The term was first used in Japanese after shortening the English loanword 'mechanism' (メカニズム, mekanizumu) or 'mechanical' (メカニカル, mekanikaru), but the meaning in Japanese is more inclusive, meaning any mechanism in general, and 'robot' (ロボット, robotto) or 'giant robot' is the narrower term referring to robots.

Mechs vary greatly in size and shape, but are distinguished from vehicles by their biomorphic appearance, and are often much larger than human beings. Different subgenres exist, with varying connotations of realism. The concept of Super Robot and Real Robot are two such examples found in Japanese anime and manga.

Real-world piloted robots (or similar machines), along with robotic platforms, may also be called "mechs". In Japanese, "mechs" may refer to mobile machinery or vehicles (not including aircraft, cars, motorcycles and HGV) in general, piloted or otherwise.

== Characteristics ==
'Mecha' is an abbreviation, first used in Japanese, of 'mechanical'. In Japanese, mecha encompasses all mechanical objects, including cars, firearms, computers, and other devices, and 'robot' or 'giant robot' is used to distinguish limbed vehicles from other mechanical devices. It has also become associated with large humanoid machines with limbs or other biological characteristics. Mecha differ from robots in that they are piloted from a cockpit, typically located in the chest or head of the mech.

While the distinction is often hazy, mecha typically does not refer to form-fitting powered armor such as Iron Man's suit. They are usually much larger than the wearer, like Iron Man's enemy the Iron Monger, or the mobile suits depicted in the Gundam franchise.

In most cases, mecha are depicted as fighting machines, whose appeal comes from the combination of potent weaponry with a more stylish combat technique than a mere vehicle. Often, they are the primary means of combat, with conflicts sometimes being decided through gladiatorial matches. Other works represent mecha as one component of an integrated military force, supported by and fighting alongside tanks, fighter aircraft, and infantry. The applications often highlight the theoretical usefulness of such a device. Combining a tank's resilience and firepower with infantry's ability to cross unstable terrain. In some continuities, special scenarios are constructed to make mecha more viable than current-day status. For example, in Gundam the fictional Minovsky particle inhibits the use of radar, making long-range ballistic strikes impractical, thus favouring relatively close-range warfare of Mobile Suits.

However, some stories, such as the manga/anime franchise Patlabor and the American wargame BattleTech universe, also encompass mecha used for civilian purposes, such as heavy construction work, police functions, or firefighting. Mecha also have roles as transporters, recreation, advanced hazmat suits, and other research and development applications.

Mecha have been used in fantasy settings, for example in the anime series Aura Battler Dunbine, The Vision of Escaflowne, Panzer World Galient, and Maze. In those cases, the mecha designs are usually based on some alternative or "lost" science-fiction technology from ancient times. In case of anime series Zoids, the machines resemble dinosaurs and animals, and have been shown to evolve from native metallic organisms.

A "chicken walker" is a fictional type of bipedal robot or mecha, distinguished by its rear-facing knee joint; examples include AT-STs from Star Wars, Zentradi battlepods from Macross, and ED-209 from RoboCop. This type of articulation resembles a bird's legs, hence the name. However, birds actually have forward-facing knees; they are digitigrade, and what most call the "knee" is actually the ankle.

== Early history ==
The 1868 Edward S. Ellis novel The Steam Man of the Prairies featured a steam-powered, back-piloted, mechanical man. The 1880 Jules Verne novel The Steam House (La Maison à Vapeur) featured a steam-powered, piloted, mechanical elephant. One of the first appearances of such machines in modern literature was the tripod (or "fighting-machine", as they are known in the novel) of H. G. Wells' famous The War of the Worlds (1897). The novel does not contain a fully detailed description of the tripods' mode of locomotion, but it is hinted at: "Can you imagine a milking stool tilted and bowled violently along the ground? That was the impression those instant flashes gave. But instead of a milking stool, imagine it a great body of machinery on a tripod stand."

Ōgon Bat, a kamishibai that debuted in 1931 (later adapted into an anime in 1967), featured the first piloted humanoid giant robot, Dai Ningen Tanku (大人間タンク), but as an enemy rather than a protagonist. In 1934, Gajo Sakamoto launched Tank Tankuro (タンクタンクロー) on a metal creature that becomes a battle machine.

The first humanoid giant robot piloted by the protagonist appeared in the manga Atomic Power Android (原子力人造人間, Genshi Ryoku Jinzō Ningen) in 1948. The manga and anime Tetsujin 28-Go, introduced in 1956, featured a robot, Tetsujin, that was controlled externally by an operator by remote control. The manga and anime Astro Boy, introduced in 1952, with its humanoid robot protagonist, was a key influence on the development of the giant robot genre in Japan. The first anime featuring a giant mecha being piloted by the protagonist from within a cockpit was the Super Robot show Mazinger Z, written by Go Nagai and introduced in 1972. Mazinger Z introduced the notion of mecha as pilotable war machines, rather than remote-controlled robots. Ken Ishikawa and Go Nagai, later, introduced the concept of 'combination' (gattai (合体)), where several units slot together to form a single robot, with Getter Robo (1974 debut).

An early use of mech-like machines outside Japan is found in "The Invisible Empire", a Federal Men's story arc by Jerry Siegel and Joe Shuster (serialized 1936 in New Comics #8–10). Other examples include the Mexican comic Invictus by Leonel Guillermo Prieto and Victaleno León; the Brazilian comic Audaz, o demolidor, by Álvaro "Aruom" Moura and Messias de Mello (1938–1949), inspired by Invictus, created for the supplement A Gazetinha from the newspaper A Gazeta; Kimball Kinnison's battle suit in E. E. "Doc" Smith's Lensman novel Galactic Patrol (1950); the French animated film The King and the Mockingbird (first released 1952), and Robert Heinlein's waldo in his 1942 short story, "Waldo" and the Mobile Infantry battle suits in Heinlein's Starship Troopers (1958).

A transforming mech can transform between a standard vehicle (such as a fighter plane or transport truck) and a fighting mecha robot. This concept of transforming mecha was pioneered by Japanese mecha designer Shōji Kawamori in the early 1980s, when he created the Diaclone toy line in 1980 and then the Macross anime franchise in 1982. In North America, the Macross franchise was adapted into the Robotech franchise in 1985, and then the Diaclone toy line was adapted into the Transformers franchise in 1986. Some of Kawamori's most iconic transforming mecha designs include the VF-1 Valkyrie from the Macross and Robotech franchises, and Optimus Prime (called Convoy in Japan) from the Transformers and Diaclone franchises.

== By genre ==
=== Anime and manga ===
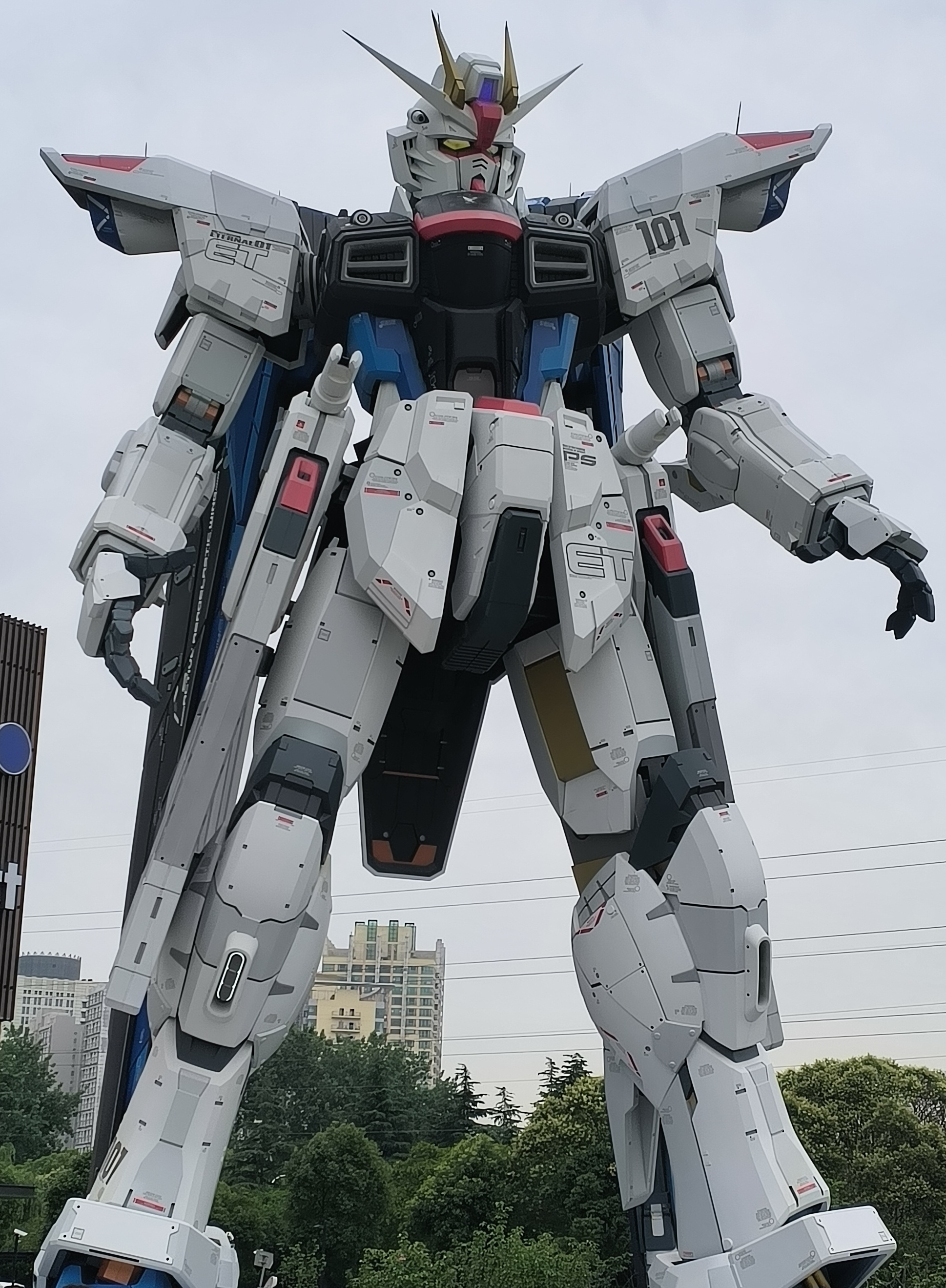
A statue of the Freedom Gundam from Mobile Suit Gundam SEED in Shanghai

In Japan, "robot anime" (known as "mecha anime" outside Japan) is one of the oldest genres in anime. Robot anime is often tied in with toy manufacturers. Large franchises such as Gundam, Macross, Transformers, and Zoids have hundreds of different model kits.

The size of mecha can vary according to the story and concepts involved. Some of them may not be considerably taller than a tank (Armored Trooper Votoms, Yatterman, Megazone 23, Code Geass), some may be a few stories tall (Gundam, Escaflowne, Bismark, Gurren Lagann), others can be titan sized as tall as a skyscraper (Space Runaway Ideon, Genesis of Aquarion, Science Ninja Team Gatchaman, Neon Genesis Evangelion), some are big enough to contain an entire city (Macross), some the size of a planet (Diebuster), galaxies (Getter Robo, Tengen Toppa Gurren Lagann), or even as large as universes (Tengen Toppa Gurren Lagann: Lagann-hen, Demonbane, Transformers: Alternity).

The first titan robots seen were in the 1948 manga Atomic Power Android (原子力人造人間, Genshiryoku Jinzō Ningen) and Mitsuteru Yokoyama's 1956 manga Tetsujin 28-go. However, it was not until the advent of Go Nagai's Mazinger Z that the genre was established. Mazinger Z innovated by adding the inclusion of futuristic weapons, and the concept of being able to pilot from a cockpit (rather than via remote control, in the case of Tetsujin). According to Go Nagai:

I wanted to create something different, and I thought it would be interesting to have a robot that you could drive, like a car.

Mazinger Z featured giant robots that were "piloted by means of a small flying car and command center that docked inside the head." It was also a pioneer in die-cast metal toys such as the Chogokin series in Japan and the Shogun Warriors in the U.S., that were (and still are) very popular with children and collectors.

Some of the first mecha featured in manga and anime were super robots. The super robot genre features superhero-like giant robots that are often one-of-a-kind and the product of an ancient civilization, aliens or a mad genius. These robots are usually piloted by Japanese teenagers via voice command or neural uplink, and are often powered by mystical or exotic energy sources.

The later real robot genre features robots that do not have mythical superpowers, but rather use largely conventional, albeit futuristic weapons and power sources, and are often mass-produced on a large scale for use in wars. The real robot genre also tends to feature more complex characters with moral conflicts and personal problems. The genre is therefore aimed primarily at young adults instead of children. Mobile Suit Gundam (1979) is largely considered the first series to introduce the real robot concept and, along with The Super Dimension Fortress Macross (1982), would form the basis of what people would later call real robot anime.

Some robot mecha are capable of transformation (Macross and Zeta Gundam) or combining to form even bigger ones (Beast King GoLion and Tengen Toppa Gurren Lagann), the latter called 'combination'. Go Nagai and Ken Ishikawa are often credited with inventing this in 1974 with Getter Robo.

Not all mecha need to be completely mechanical. Some have biological components with which to interface with their pilots, and some are partially biological themselves, such as in Neon Genesis Evangelion, Eureka Seven, and Zoids.

Mecha based on anime have seen strong cultural reception across the world, such as in the form of 1:1-sized Mazinger Z, Tetsujin, and Gundam statues built across the world.

=== Video games ===
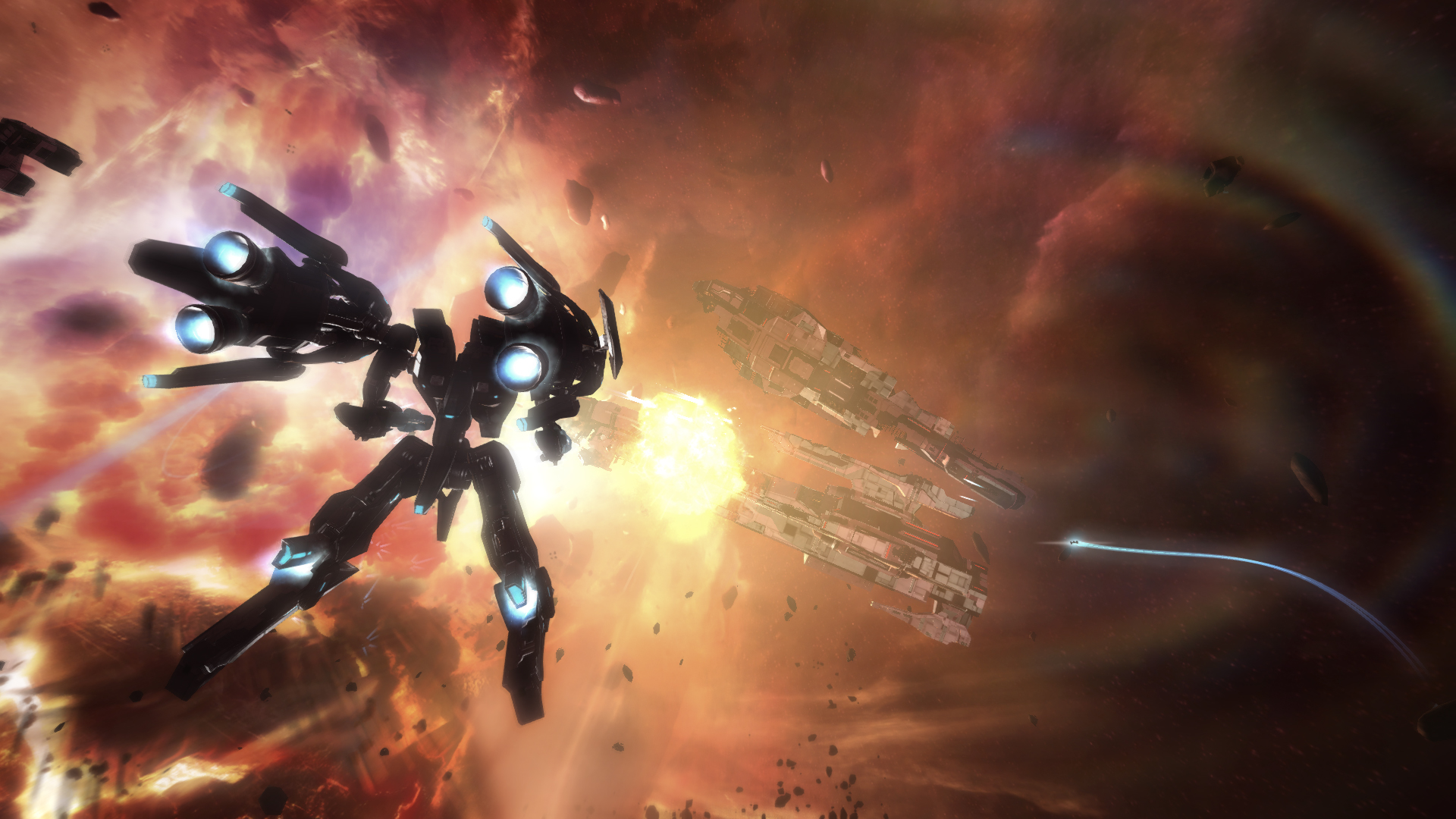
Strike Suit Zero is a 2013 space combat video game featuring mecha designs by Junji Okubo.

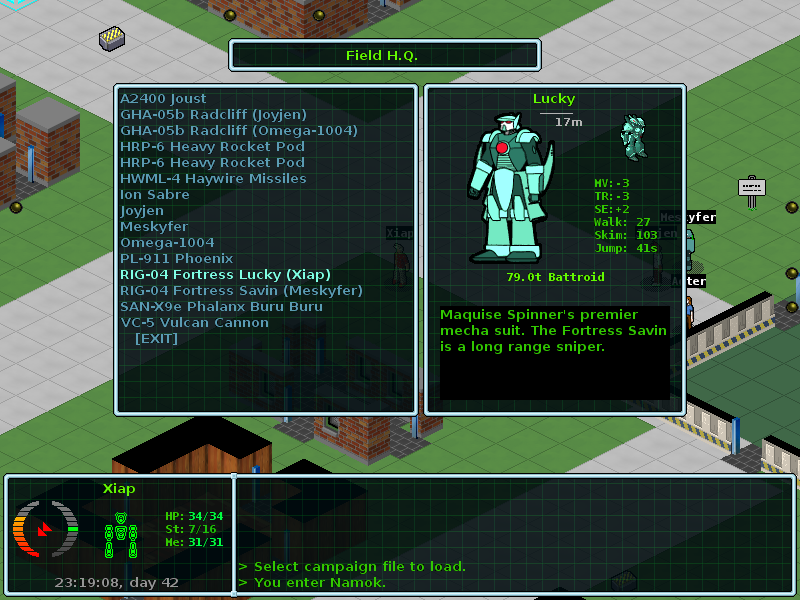
Mecha selection menu in the roguelike, GearHead RPG

Mecha are often featured in computer and console video games. Because of their size and fictional power, mecha are popular subjects for games, both tabletop and electronic. They have been featured in video games since the 1980s, particularly in vehicular combat and shooter games, including Sesame Japan's side-scrolling shooter game Vastar in 1983, various Gundam games such as Mobile Suit Gundam: Last Shooting in 1984 and Z-Gundam: Hot Scramble in 1986, the run and gun shooters Hover Attack in 1984 and Thexder in 1985, and Arsys Software's 3D role-playing shooters WiBArm in 1986 and Star Cruiser in 1988. Historically, mecha-based games have been more popular in Japan than in other countries.

== Real mecha ==
There are a few real prototypes of mecha-like vehicles. Currently almost all of these are highly specialized or just for concept purpose, and as such may not see mass production. Most of these experimental projects were made and first presented in East Asia.

- In 2012, Suidobashi Heavy Industry unveiled their prototype of a driveable mecha, the Kuratas.
- In December 2016, Korean company Hankook Mirae posted a video featuring a test run of their bi-pedal prototype mecha METHOD-01, designed by Vitaly Bulgarov.
- A machine called Land Walker was developed by Sakakibara Kikai with the intention of giving the impression of a bipedal mecha.
- In 2018, Japanese engineer Masaaki Nagumo from Sakakibara Kikai completed construction of a functional bipedal mecha inspired by the Gundam franchise. The device, standing 8.5 meters tall and weighing about 7 tonnes, possesses fully functional arm and leg servos.
- Another Gundam-based mecha, 60 feet tall and with fully functional articulation, was put on exhibit by Gundam Factory Yokohama on December 19, 2020, and was kept on display until March 31, 2024. On October, 23rd, 2024, the remains of the mecha were unveiled at a ceremony on Yumeshima Island, now repurposed as a statue for the upcoming Osaka-Kansai Expo.
- In 2023, the Japanese startup Tsubame Industries developed a 4.5-metre-tall four-wheeled robot called ARCHAX.

In the Western world, there are few examples of mecha, however, several machines have been constructed by both companies and private figures.

- In 1813, British engineer William Brunton designed and built a steam locomotive propelled by mechanical legs, called the Steam Horse.
- The GE Beetle, a mobile piloted manipulator for nuclear materials, which entered operation in 1961.
- In 2006, Timberjack, a subsidiary of John Deere, built a practical hexapod walking harvester.
- In 2015, Megabots Inc. completed the MKII "Iron Glory" before challenging Kuratas to a duel. In 2017 they completed the MKIII "Eagle Prime".
- In 2017, Canadian engineering company, Furrion Exo-Bionics, unveiled Prosthesis: The Anti-Robot, invented by Jonathan Tippett, as the company's flagship prototype mech. It is a 3500 kg, 200 hp, electric powered, 4-legged, all-terrain walking mech intended for use in competitive sport. It is controlled by the human pilot inside via a full-body exo-skeletal interface. In 2020 it was awarded the Guinness World Record as "the world's largest tetrapod exoskeleton".

== See also ==
- BattleMech
- Kuratas
- Megabots Inc.
- Mobile robot
- Powered exoskeleton
- Robot Romance Trilogy
- Sentry gun
- Walking vehicle
