= Open Source Medical Supplies =

Open source PPE organization

- Formation: 2020
- Headquarters: USA
- Founders: Ja’dan Johnson and Gui Cavalcanti
- Website: https://opensourcemedicalsupplies.org/

Open Source Medical Supplies is a not for profit organization that collates and shares open source designs to make personal protective equipment and other medical supplies needed in the COVID-19 pandemic.

== Organization ==
Open Source Medical Supplies founded by Ja’dan Johnson and Gui Cavalcanti in March 2020 as the COVID-19 pandemic was escalating. Initial activities were coordinated through a Facebook group which grew to 52,000 members. A team of 130 people coordinate and filter the information in the group.

== Activities ==
Open Source Medical Supplies provides a library of 195 DIY instructions on how to fabricate healthcare items including face masks. All designs are vetted by a team of thirty healthcare professionals. Open Source Medical Supplies has shipped over 15 million items of medical supplies.

OSMS volunteers in Brazil

OSMS volunteers in Brazil

OSMS volunteers in Taiwan

OSMS volunteers in Cape Fear, USA

OSMS volunteers at Fuse 33 Maker Space, Canada

OSMS volunteers at the University of Washington DFAV

The group inspired the Open Source Ventilator Ireland Project.

== See also ==
- Shortages related to the COVID-19 pandemic
- Maker culture
