= Twelve (company) =

Chemical technology company

- Founded: 2015; 11 years ago
- Founders: Kendra Kuhl; Etosha Cave; Nicholas Flanders
- Website: www.twelve.co

Twelve is a chemical technology company based in Berkeley, California. They develop technology to convert CO_{2} into profitable chemicals, such as plastics and transportation fuels. Currently, the company uses metal catalysts to produce synthetic gas (syngas), methane, and ethylene.

== History ==
Originally launched under the name Obtainium in 2014, and later known as Opus 12, Twelve was officially founded in 2015 by Dr. Kendra Kuhl, Dr. Etosha Cave, and Nicholas Flanders. The company was part of Lawrence Berkeley National Laboratory's first Cyclotron Road cohort, an incubator program that aids in the creation of environmentally beneficial companies. Since then, it has won multiple awards including the Keeling Curve prize, Ocean Exchange's WW Orcelle award, the Roddenberry prize, and Forbes' Change the World competition. In 2021, Twelve received $57 million in series A funding; the company has also received funding through SBIR grants for projects involving CO_{2} conversion. This includes generating products such as carbon monoxide, polyethylene, ethanol, ethylene, methane, and jet fuel.

In June 2022, Twelve announced $130 million in Series B funding with investment from DCVC and the Chan Zuckerberg Initiative.

Twelve has also been featured on the television show Inside Bill's Brain as a company providing a potential solution to greenhouse gas emissions.

In June 2026, Twelve opened AirPlant One in Moses Lake, Washington, the first U.S. commercial-scale power-to-liquid sustainable aviation fuel plant. Backed by Microsoft and Alaska Airlines, it produces CO₂-derived E-Jet fuel and E-Naphtha for commercial use.

== Technology ==
Nicholas Flanders describes the company's technology as "industrial photosynthesis" to create jet fuel and diesel from carbon dioxide. Their technology has been shown to convert CO_{2} from raw biogas into carbon neutral methane.

Twelve utilizes polymer electrolyte membrane electrolysis, which splits apart water molecules into its component pieces (O_{2}, electrons, and hydrogen ions) via the application of electricity. By adding a catalyst to the cathode, they are able to split up CO_{2} into CO and O_{2}.

In February 2020, Twelve partnered with Mercedes and Trinseo to create the world's first C-pillar made with polycarbonate from CO_{2} electrolysis.

In June 2020, the company partnered with SoCalGas and PG&E to advance their technology for use with CO_{2} present in biogas, which comes from sources such as landfills, sewage, and dairy farms. This gas, produced by the anaerobic breakdown of wastes, contains roughly 60% methane and 40% CO_{2}; testing is being performed with the goal of achieving high conversion efficiency for long periods of time.

In September 2021 Twelve partnered with LanzaTech to create polypropylene, a commonly used plastic which is traditionally produced from fossil fuels; this is the first time that polypropylene was made from CO_{2}.

Twelve plans to scale up their technology to an industrial-sized shipping container, which would enable them to produce larger quantities of product.
