= Kuratas =

Japanese mecha

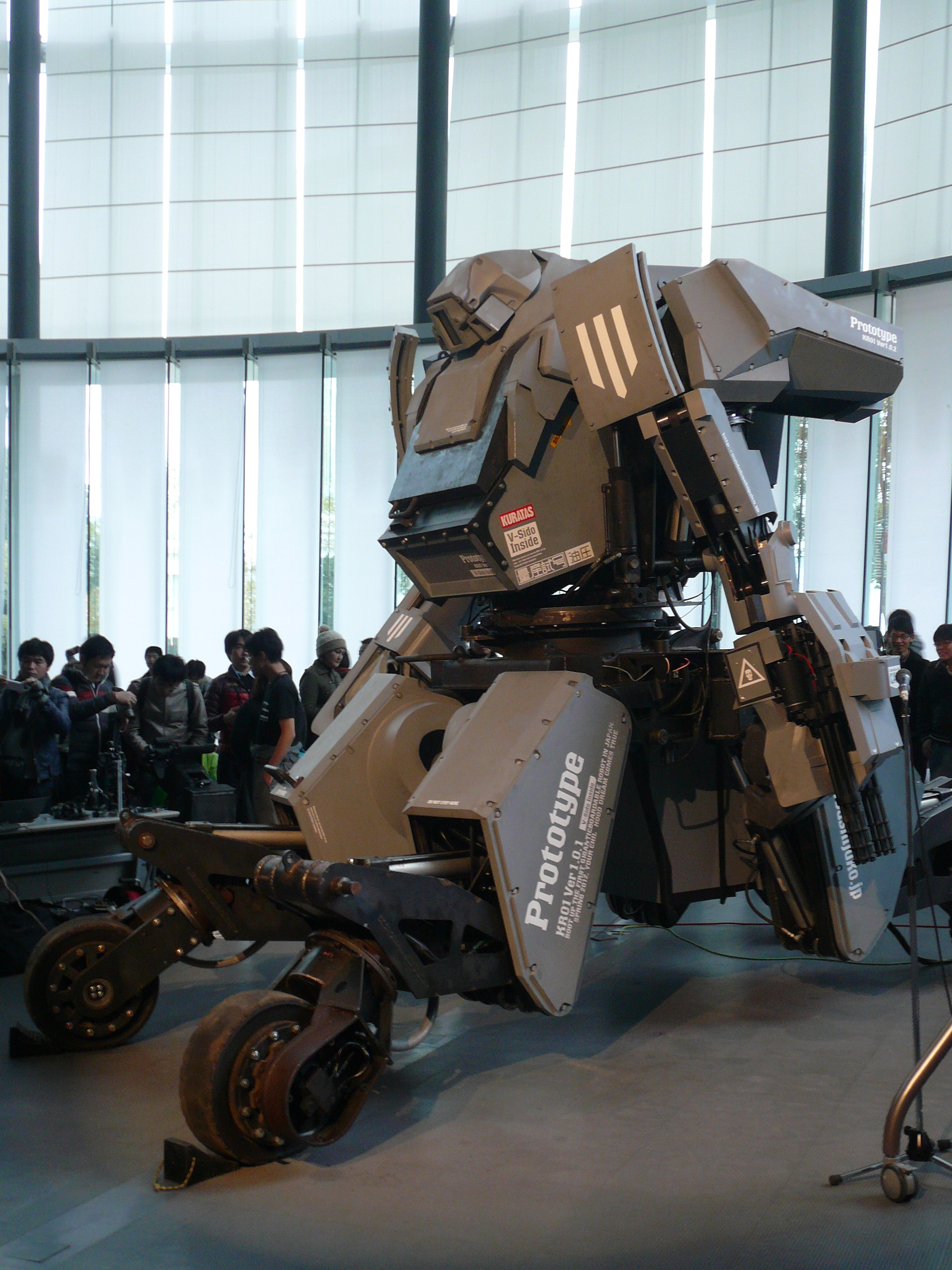
Kuratas

Kuratas is a rideable and user-operated mecha built by the Japanese company Suidobashi Heavy Industry. Billed as "the world's first giant boarding robot", the Kuratas was unveiled when the website was opened in 2012. It was demonstrated at Wonder Festival. In June 2015, MegaBots challenged Suidobashi Heavy Industry to its first robot duel confronting Kuratas versus their Mark II.

== Developers ==
The Kuratas robot was developed by artist Kogoro Kurata (after whom the suit is named), and roboticist Wataru Yoshizaki.

Kurata stated that he was inspired by the mecha frequently featured in anime, especially those of the series Armored Trooper Votoms, which he watched as a child. "When I was a kid, I thought there were going to be giant robots in the future. But no matter how long I waited, people were only able to make small robots, like ASIMO. Eventually, I thought 'I can't wait anymore,' and set out to make one myself." Kurata's goal was to create a piece of art that emulated the mecha he had watched growing up.

Yoshizaki was brought onboard the project to create the software for the robot's movement and pilot interaction.

== Mechanics ==
The vehicle weighs approximately 4,500 kg (9,900 lb), and is approximately 4 m (13 ft 1 in) tall.

It can be crewed by one person; that operator would sit in the "body" of the robot in a seat, with the control device in front of them. The Kuratas can also be controlled externally by remote control.

Kuratas sports a four-wheeled, thirty joint exoskeleton. which is controlled by the pilot or can be controlled remotely. The remote operator uses a 3g touch screen phone as the primary interface. The on-board pilot's user interface (UI) is a Kinect based device.

The vehicle can be "armed" with multiple weapons, such as a 6,000 round per minute twin BB rotary cannon, a "LOHAS" launcher which fires either water bottles or possibly fireworks, and a powered humanoid hand called the "iron crow" that is capable of picking up objects, and is linked to the pilot by "what appears to be a Mattel Power Glove". The main Suidobashi website lists two other "weapons", a "Kuratas Handgun", and a "Pilebunker".

Currently, the Kuratas is not capable of walking, but is able to drive forward and backwards on its four wheels at around 10 km/h. It cannot turn without external assistance.

As of 25 April 2013, Kuratas has a price of US$1,353,500 (¥134,555,495, or €1,040,976).

== In the media ==
In January 2014 it was reported that a yellow customized construction type Kuratas was planned to be featured in the then upcoming film series The Next Generation: Patlabor.

== See also ==
- Mecha
- Powered exoskeleton
- Glossary of robotics
