= MegaBots Inc. =

American technology startup company

- Type: Private
- Industry: Retail
- Genre: giant robots
- Founded: 2014; 12 years ago
- Founders: Gui Cavalcanti; Matt Oehrlein; Andrew Stroup; Brinkley Warren
- Headquarters: Hayward, California, United States
- Number of locations: 1
- Key people: Founders: Gui Cavalcanti; Matt Oehrlein; Andrew Stroup; Brinkley Warren
- Products: giant robots
- Website: megabots.com

MegaBots Inc. was an American startup company headquartered in Hayward, California that created giant robots and real-world mecha for robotic sports competitions.

In June 2015, MegaBots challenged Japan-based Suidobashi Heavy Industry to the world's first giant robot duel. Suidobashi accepted the challenge on the condition that the fight include melee combat. In 2017, the company premiered a scripted version of the duel on Twitch TV, which ended in victory for the MegaBots team.

In 2019, Matt Oehrlein declared MegaBots had run out of money. The same year, the company liquidated its assets, selling off its giant robot Eagle Prime on eBay.

== History ==
MegaBots was co-founded in 2014 by Gui Cavalcanti, Matt Oehrlein, and Andrew Stroup (and follow-on co-founder Brinkley Warren in 2015) with the vision to start an international robot fighting sports league.

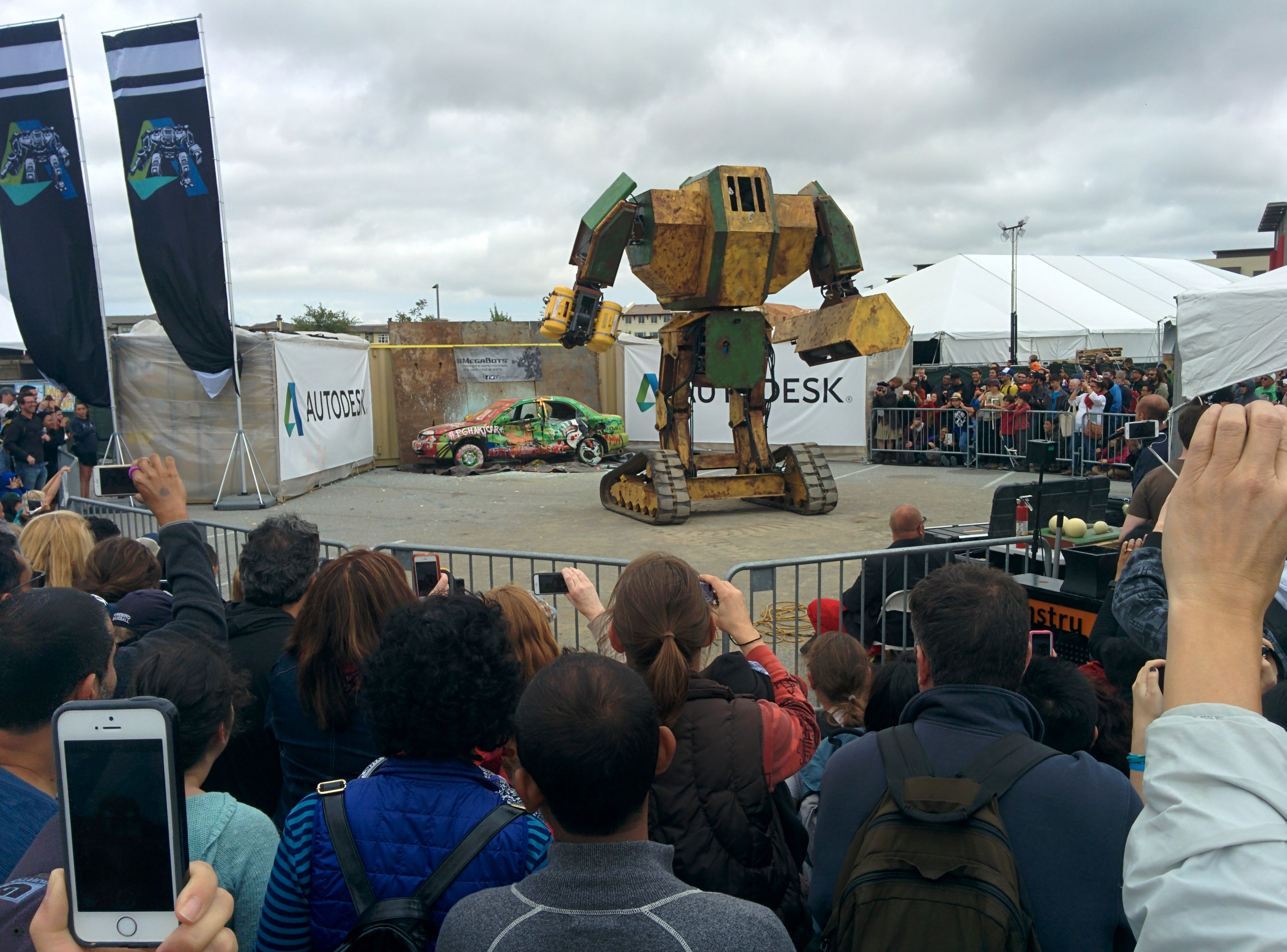
MegaBot at Maker Faire 2015

The company premiered the Mark II ("Iron Glory") robot at Maker Faire in 2015. The company then went on to raise a seed round of $3.85M dollars from investors including Autodesk, DCM, Maveron, Azure Capital, and AME Cloud Ventures. In August 2015, MegaBots announced plans to upgrade its Mark II robot with melee capabilities by raising funds through a Kickstarter campaign and partnering with Howe and Howe Technologies, NASA, and IHMC. MegaBots launched a YouTube web series at Techcrunch Disrupt 2016. The series followed the progress of the team as they upgraded the Mark II robot to take on the Kuratas. The company won Best in Show at the 2017 LAUNCH Startup Festival and announced a total subscriber base of more than 250k, 20M+ video views, 29 billion press mentions, and an advertising equivalency value of $270M, which is one third of the brand value of the Transformers franchise during the period since MegaBots was founded. The company also announced its plans to launch spin-offs of the MegaBots entertainment brand in verticals such live events, sponsorship, TV/Digital, and merchandising. The company premiered the Mk.III ("Eagle Prime") robot at Maker Faire Bay Area in 2017 and the robot was featured on Jay Leno's Garage.

After the company encountered complications while producing the world's first giant robot duel in Japan, at the request of Suidobashi Heavy Industries; a scripted version of the duel was filmed and was premiered on Amazon's Twitch TV in October 2017, with MegaBots winning in two rounds over Suidobashi. The match has since been viewed over 8.9M times and received a Guinness World Record in the category of "Largest Robots to Fight".

In September 2019, the company had run out of money. Their assets were liquidated and the Eagle Prime robot that cost the company $2,500,000 to build was sold on eBay for $29,900.
