= Artisans Asylum =

Community workshop in Allston, Massachusetts

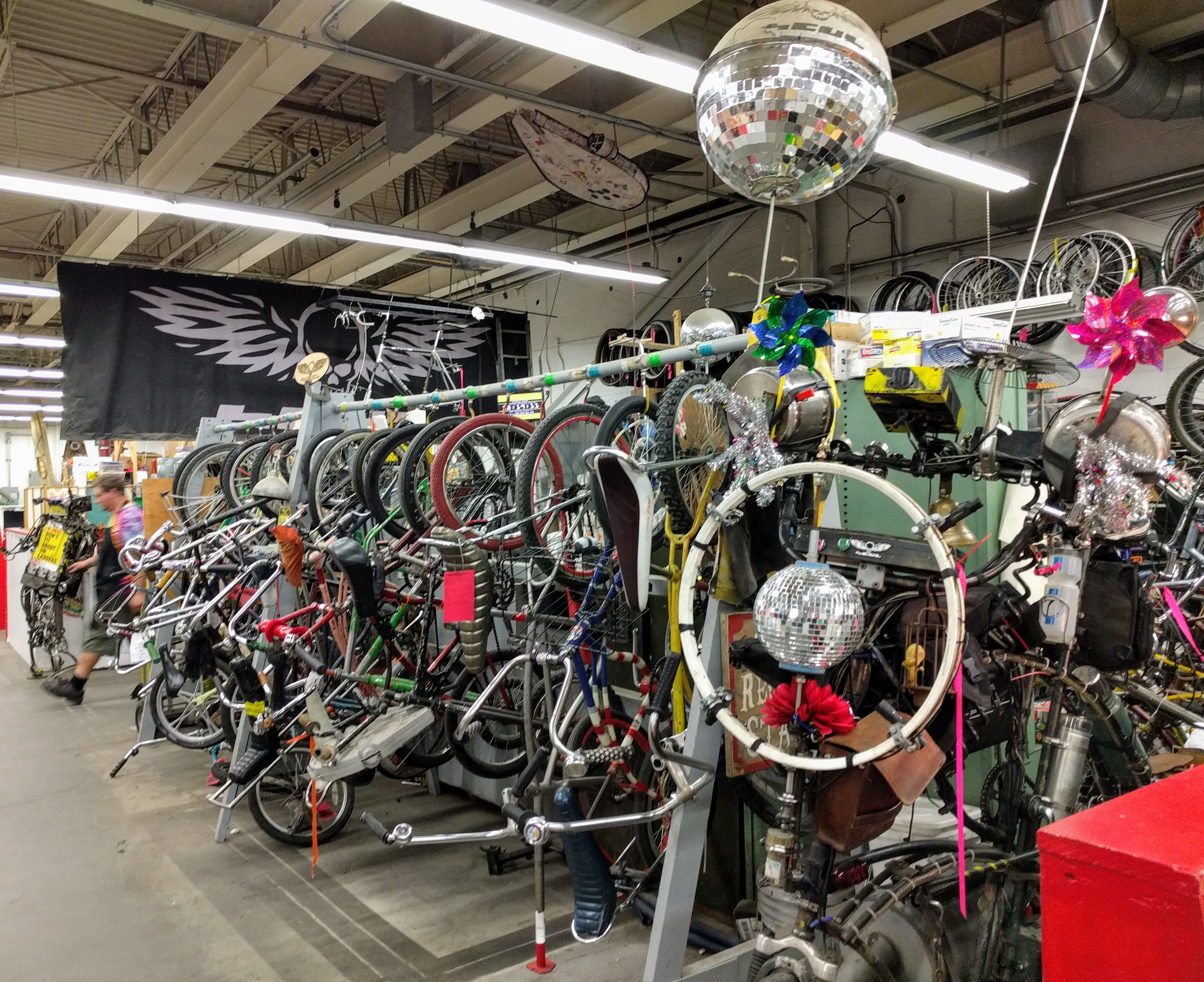
Artisans Asylum in 2017.

Artisans Asylum is a non-profit community workshop in Allston, Massachusetts. Artisans Asylum was founded in 2010 by an engineer, an artist, and friends. Artisans was the first makerspace to incorporate in the U.S. in 2012. Today, it holds 52,000 square feet of fabrication space between two buildings.

Artisans Asylum hosts approximately 600 monthly active members, 160 studios, and 15 workshops. Shops include woodworking, welding, bicycle maintenance and repair, machining, electronics and robotics, jewelry, digital fabrication, a digital photo studio, fiber arts, casting, laser cutting, CNC machines, prop shop, and design lab. The Asylum hosts 30-40 public classes each month, providing hands-on tool training and skill-building courses. As of 2013, the Asylum housed 40 or 50 small manufacturing companies, and raised the number of manufacturing firms in nearby Somerville by 50%. The Asylum is credited with attracting the incubator Greentown Labs to Somerville and contributing to the city's creative economy.

In 2023, it generated $1.4 million dollars in revenue and $2.25 million in expenses.

== Location in Allston ==
In January 2023, Artisans relocated from 10 Tyler St. in Somerville to two buildings in Allston, a neighborhood of Boston. This move resulted in a 10,000 square foot expansion of the space.

=== 96 Holton St. ===
96 Holton St, referred to as "Holton", is the primary address for Artisans Asylum. It contains the front desk and mail center. All public-facing events, including classes, occur at or require check-in at this address. This building houses several communal workshops, including those dedicated fiber arts, electronics and robotics, jewelry-making, digital fabrication, screen printing, and metal casting.

=== 55 Antwerp St. ===
Referred to as "Antwerp", this building contains a metal shop, machine shop, and wood shop. SCUL, a bicycle-based "chopper gang", is based in this building as well.

== Organizational Structure ==
Members at Artisans Asylum have 24/7 access to the space via key fobs distributed at new member orientations. The space is largely member-run, and it relies on volunteers to clean and maintain shops and common areas. The front desk is run by a fleet of volunteers termed "Deskies". Tool testers, who ensure that new users can safely operate machinery, are also volunteers.

Artisans Asylum has three full-time staff who manage development, facilities, and educational programs.
