= Olin =

Olin may refer to:

== Organizations ==
- OLIN, American landscape architecture firm
- Olin Business School at Washington University in St. Louis
- Olin College, an undergraduate engineering college in Massachusetts
- Olin Corporation, a chemical corporation with a history of producing chemicals and ammunition
- Olin Edirne, the former name of Turkish basketball team Eskişehir Basket
- F. W. Olin Foundation, a foundation endowed by Franklin W. Olin
- John M. Olin Foundation, a foundation endowed by John M. Olin
- Preston and Olin Institute, a defunct Methodist boys' school, now a part of Virginia Tech

== Places ==
- Olin, Iowa, a small city in the United States
- Olin, North Carolina, an unincorporated community in the United States
- Olin, Poland
- Olin's Covered Bridge, the only bridge in Ashtabula County, Ohio named for a family
- Olin Observatory, an astronomical observatory in New London, Connecticut

== Fictional characters ==
- Olin, a character on the TV series General Hospital
- Gerald Olin, character in the 2007 film 1408, portrayed by Samuel L. Jackson
- The Reverend Olin Blitch, lead bass-baritone role in the opera Susannah by Carlisle Floyd

== Other uses ==
- Nahui Ollin, also spelled Ōlīn, a concept in Aztec mythology potentially related to Tōnatiuh
- Olin (spider), a spider genus in the family Trochanteriidae
- Olin Palladium Award, an award given by the Electrochemical Society
- Olin Raschig process, an industrial process for manufacturing hydrazine
