= Michael S. Joyce =

American conservative activist

- Born: July 5, 1942; Cleveland, Ohio, U.S.
- Died: February 24, 2006 (aged 63); Germantown, Wisconsin, U.S.
- Occupation: Conservative activist

Michael S. Joyce (July 5, 1942 – February 24, 2006) was an American conservative activist.

== Biography ==
=== Early and education ===
Joyce was born in Cleveland, Ohio, on July 5, 1942. He grew up in a family of blue-collar Catholic Democrats. He attended Kent State University briefly and then transferred to Cleveland State University, where he graduated with a B.A. degree in history and philosophy in 1967. In 1974, he received a Ph.D. in education from Walden University.

=== Career ===
His first job was as a high school history teacher in Cleveland. In 1968, he took a job at the Educational Research Council of America, which produced high school textbooks in history and government courses.

In 1975, he started his career in philanthropy as chairman of the Goldseker Foundation in Baltimore. In 1978, he headed the Institute for Educational Affairs, a not-for-profit educational organization chaired by Irving Kristol and William E. Simon.

In 1979, he was appointed executive vice president of the John M. Olin Foundation, where he served until 1985. During his tenure, he helped launch the Federalist Society, a group of conservative and libertarian lawyers, the Collegiate Network, a consortium of conservative student publications at American colleges, and The New Criterion, a conservative journal of arts and intellectual life. In 1980, he served on President Ronald Reagan's transition team. As such, he co-authored a chapter on the arts and humanities endowments for The Heritage Foundation, leading to the appointment of William Bennett as President Reagan's Chairman of the National Endowment for the Humanities. His work at the Olin Foundation is credited with further influencing the policies of the Reagan administration.

From 1985 to 2001, he served as chairman of the Bradley Foundation headquartered in Milwaukee, Wisconsin. He helped launch the Wisconsin Policy Research Institute. He supported the school choice movement in the US. In 1993, he and William Kristol established the Project for the Republican Future, an organization to regain the Congress and the presidency. It played a role in the 1994 healthcare debate during the Clinton administration and in the 1994 victory in Congressional elections.

In 2001, he was encouraged by President George W. Bush and Senior Advisor Karl Rove to lead Americans for Community and Faith-Centered Enterprises, advancing Bush's agenda of faith based initiatives. He also co-founded the Foundation for Community and Faith-Centered Enterprise, headquartered in Phoenix. He later became a principal with Practical Strategies, Inc., a public policy consulting firm with offices in Washington, D.C. and Wisconsin. He was the first Chairman of the Philanthropy Roundtable and helped establish the National Commission on Philanthropy and Civic Renewal. He sat on the Boards of Directors of the Blue Cross Blue Shield Association, Harp & Eagle, the Pinkerton Foundation, the Foundation for Cultural Review, the National Center for Neighborhood Enterprise and the Clare Booth Luce Fund. He was a member of the Mont Pelerin Society and the Sovereign Military Order of Malta.

Irving Kristol called him "the godfather of modern philanthropy".

=== Personal life ===
He retired on Big Cedar Lake in West Bend, Wisconsin. He was married and had three children. He died of liver disease in a hospice in Germantown, Wisconsin, on February 24, 2006.
