= Olin Foundation =

Olin Foundation may refer to:

- F. W. Olin Foundation, a foundation for university engineering buildings and programs
- John M. Olin Foundation, a foundation for university law and economics programs and scholars
- Spencer T. & Ann W. Olin Foundation, from Spencer Truman Olin, a foundation for environmental groups and health and medical education and services
