= F. W. Olin Foundation =

Defunct American grantmaking organization

- Formation: 1938
- Founder: Franklin W. Olin
- Dissolved: 2005
- Type: Grantmaking foundation

The Franklin W. Olin Foundation, founded as the Olin Foundation in 1938 by Franklin W. Olin, was an independent grantmaking foundation from its founding in 1938 until it spent down its corpus and closed down in 2005.

== History ==
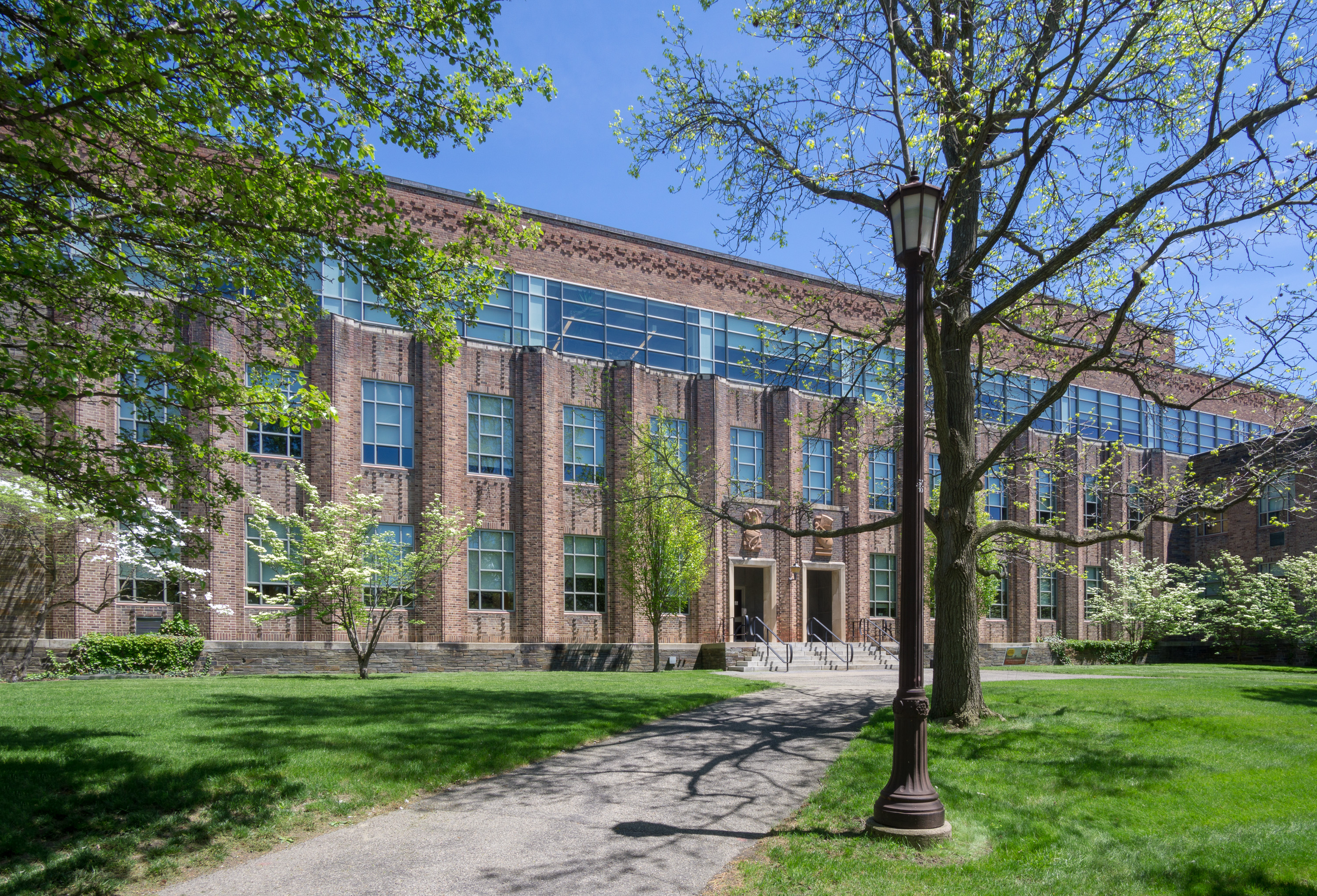
Olin Hall, the Chemical Engineering building at Cornell University.

Olin used the foundation for personal giving, including gifts for a chemical engineering building in the Engineering Quadrangle at Cornell University and a vocational high school in Alton, Illinois. In creating the foundation, Olin passed control of what would become the Olin Corporation to his sons, Spencer and John, while donating controlling shares to the foundation. "The old man then took his marbles out of the game," as Fortune described the transaction. "He plunked his stock into a charitable foundation.... If the boys did not want control of the company to pass to the foundation on his death, they'd jolly well have to hustle up the money to buy back the shares." The Olin sons did that, which left $50 million in the foundation's corpus, making it one of the largest foundations in the country.

After Olin died in 1951, his three trustees—Charles L. Horn, an Olin business associate; tax attorney James O. Wynn; and financial consultant Ralph Clark—continued Olin's grant program under the same principles as his Cornell gift: funding academic buildings while paying the full cost, including equipment and furnishings. They hired no staff and administered the program at the trustee level. Grants to vocational schools in the segregated South required that schools be racially integrated.

In the 1970s, new board members were elected: business executive Carlton T. Helming, lawyer Lawrence W. Milas, and business executive William B. Horn (son of previous board member Charles). Horn and Helming were later replaced by William Norden and William Schmidt. They continued the previous pattern of grantmaking until 1997. From 1938 to 1997, the Olin Foundation distributed grants for 78 buildings at 58 institutions, briefly listed below. "We always had a bias toward supporting science and engineering schools because Mr. Olin was an engineer," Milas said.

In the 1990s, the foundation decided to wind down philanthropic operations by founding a new college, with the intention of eventually transferring remaining funds from the foundation to the college (discussed below). In 2005, the foundation dissolved itself and transferred remaining assets to Olin College of Engineering. The foundation closed in the same year as the John M. Olin Foundation, which was established by Franklin's son John. The John M. Olin Foundation also shut down for reasons of preserving donor intent, though the organizations are unrelated.

=== Franklin W. Olin College of Engineering ===
In the early 1990s, the board of the Olin Foundation began to worry about the perpetuation of donor intent in subsequent generations. "We were concerned about how we were going to find people committed to continue the grant program, who wouldn't come in with their own agenda, their own baggage, and try to change things around," Milas said. "With the escalation of building costs, would we be able to sustain that grant program? We were locked into what we had as a private foundation. Would we remain relevant if we couldn't substantially grow our assets?"

The board evaluated options, and decided to pursue an idea that Olin had suggested in the 1940s: starting a new college. In 1997, they chartered the Franklin W. Olin College of Engineering and made an initial gift of $200 million. Milas was president initially, but he soon hired Richard Miller as the college's president and first full-time employee. In 2005, after the college had been operating for several years, the foundation dissolved itself and transferred the balance of its endowment, an additional $250 million, to the college.

== Other buildings and schools funded by the foundation ==
Funded by the foundation

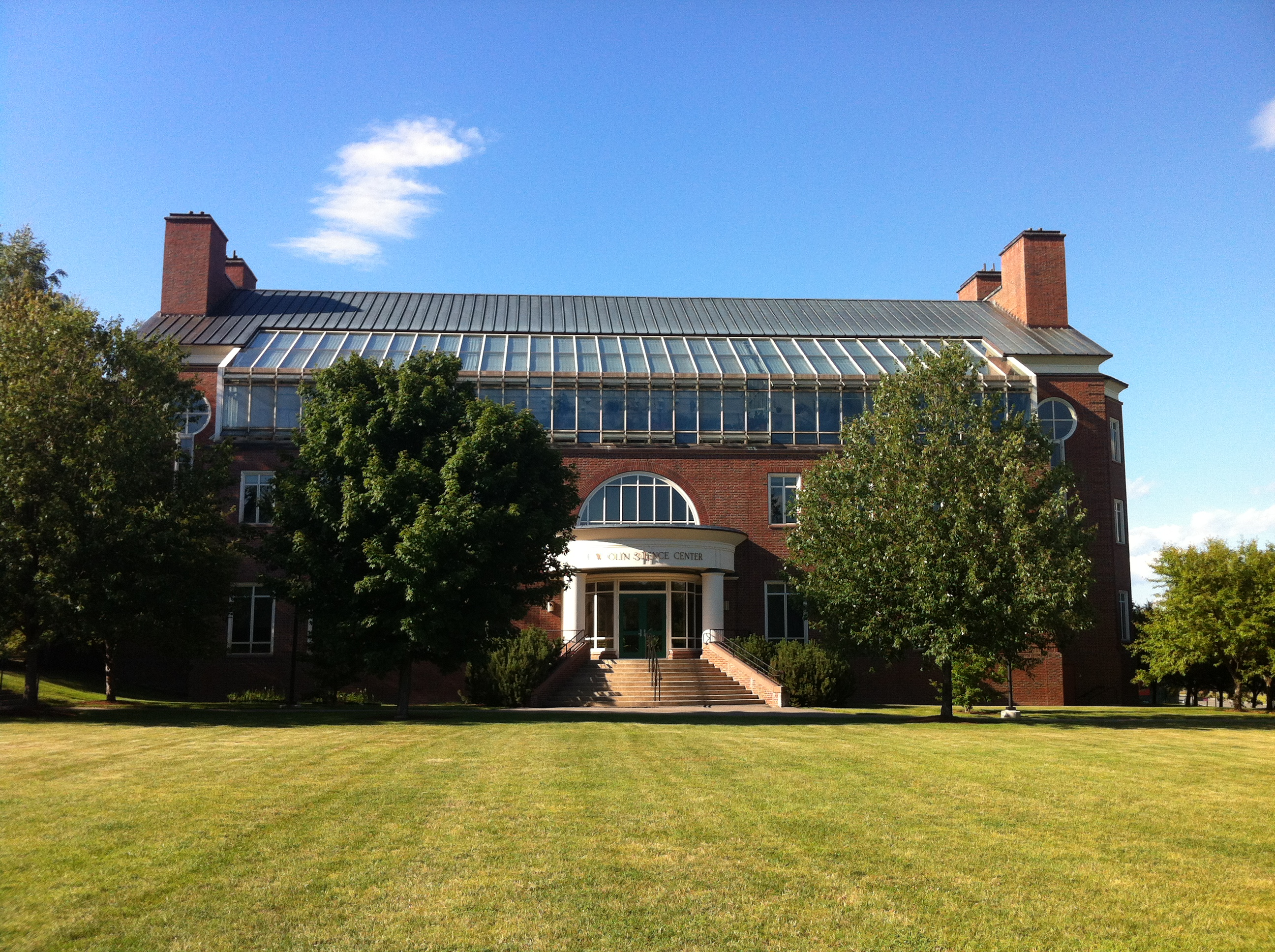
Olin Science Building at Colby College

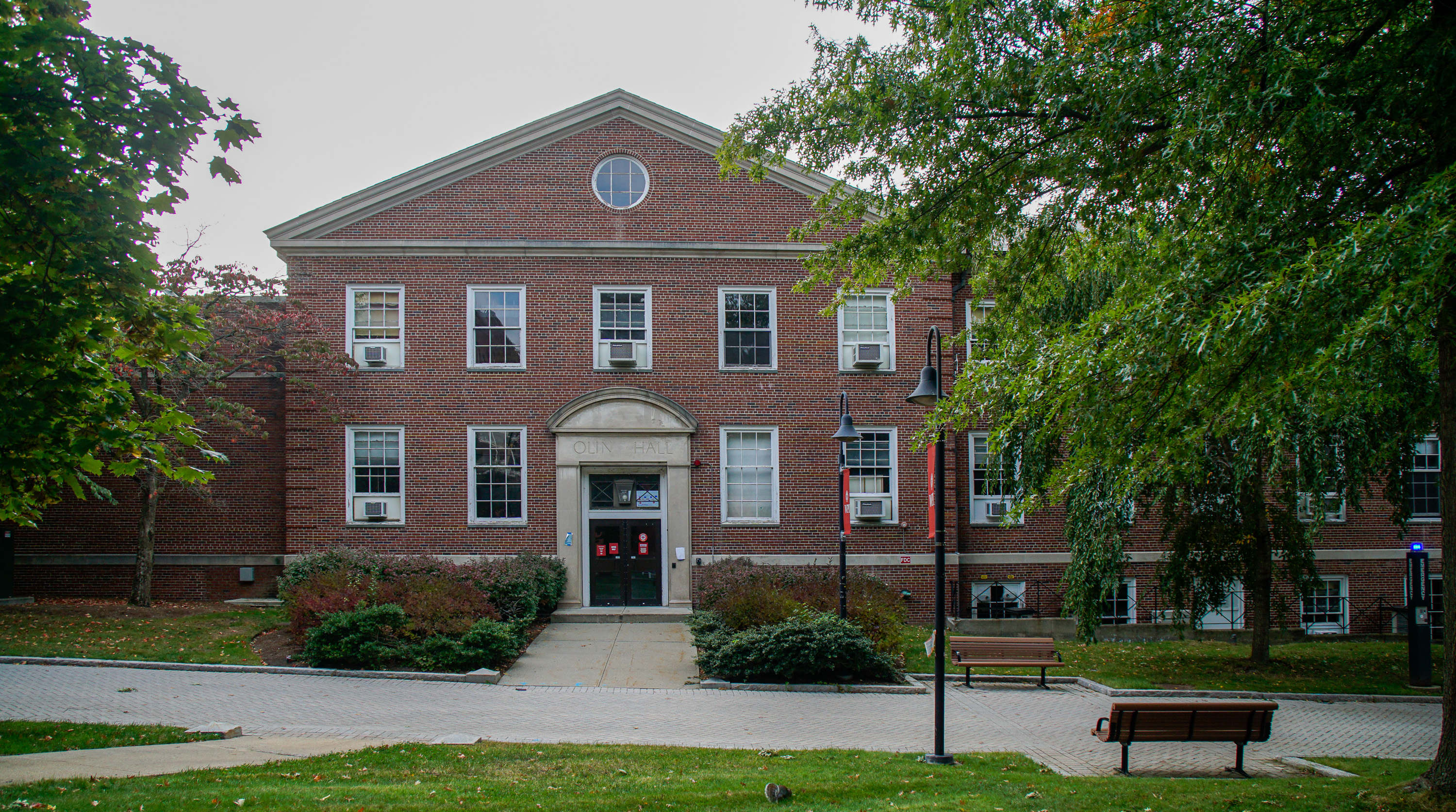
Olin Hall at Worcester Polytechnic Institute

The following is an incomplete list of other schools, programs, or buildings funded by the Franklin W. Olin foundation before its closure:

- William H. Coleman Hall at Bucknell University
- F. W. Olin Science Building at Bucknell University
- Olin Center for Educational Technology, Augustana College (Illinois)
- F. W. Olin Building, Southwestern University
- Franklin W. Olin Building Luther College (Iowa)
- Olin-Rice Science Center, Macalester College
- F. W. Olin Center, Union College
- Olin Hall, Ursinus College
- F. W. Olin Center, Tufts University
- F. W. Olin Graduate School of Business, Babson College
- F. W. Olin Hall, University of Denver
- F. W. Olin Hall, fine arts building at Roanoke College
- F. W. Olin Hall, residence hall at Cornell College
- F. W. Olin Hall, residence hall at Weill Cornell Medicine
- F. W. Olin Library at Mills College
- F. W. Olin Physical Sciences Center, Florida Institute of Technology
- F. W. Olin Science Center, Harvey Mudd College
- F. W. Olin Science Center, containing the Olin Observatory, Connecticut College
- Franklin W. Olin Jr. Hall, Cornell University
- Olin Arts Center, Bates College
- Olin Engineering Building, Hampton University
- Olin Engineering Center, Marquette University
- Olin Fine Arts Center, Washington & Jefferson College
- Olin Hall, housing the physics department of Worcester Polytechnic Institute
- Olin Hall, housing the departments of biology, psychology, and environmental science and sustainability of Drake University.
- Olin Hall, housing the departments of biology, chemistry, and physics of Bradley University
- Olin Hall, Whitman College
- Olin Hall of Science, Carleton College
- Olin Library (Rollins College)
- Olin Science Building, Colby College
- Franklin W. Olin Hall, Centre College
- Franklin W. Olin Building, Alfred University
- Franklin W. Olin Building, Wofford College
- Olin Hall, Roanoke College
- Olin Hall, Johns Hopkins University
- Olin Hall, University of San Diego
- Olin School of Business, Washington University in St. Louis
- Olin Physical Laboratory, Wake Forest University
- Olin Arts and Communication Center/Humanities Building, Concordia College (Moorhead, Minnesota)
- Olin Hall, University of Akron
- F.W. Olin Science Hall, Denison University
- F.W. Olin Biological Sciences Building, DePauw University
- Olin Hall of Engineering, University of Southern California
- Vivian Hall of Engineering, University of Southern California
- Olin Laboratory for Materials, Case Institute of Technology
- Crawford Hall, Case Western Reserve University
- Olin Hall, Rose-Hulman Institute of Technology
- Olin Hall, Gustavus Adolphus College

== See also ==
- John M. Olin Foundation, named for Franklin W. Olin's son
