= Robert E. Maizell =

American chemist (1924–2007)

- Born: 1924; Baltimore, Maryland, U.S.
- Died: April 8, 2007 (aged 82–83)
- Education: Loyola University Maryland; Columbia University
- Scientific career
- Fields: Chemistry
- Workplaces: Olin Mathieson Chemical; American Institute of Physics; Technology Information Consultants

Robert E. Maizell (1924–2007) was an American chemical information scholar who served at the American Institute of Physics as a director of a research project which focused on communication between scientists. Maizell also served as the head of the research library at Olin Mathieson Chemical.

== Early life and education ==
Robert Edward Maizell was born in 1924 in Baltimore, Maryland. In 1945, he earned his Bachelor of Science in chemistry from Loyola University Maryland. In 1951, Maizell joined the American Chemical Society. Maizell won a scholarship to Columbia University for his master's program for the 1948–1949 academic year, and by 1957, he had a Bachelor of Science, Master of Science, and a PhD in Library Science.

== Career and academic work ==
Maizell worked with Mathieson Chemical in Niagara Falls, New York, and eventually relocated to New Haven, Connecticut once Mathieson Chemical merged with Olin Corporation. There, Maizell worked as a business manager and was also in charge of the research library. He remained with them until he retired in 1986. In 1958, Maizell was also offered a position with the American Institute of Physics which was funded by the National Science Foundation and the Atomic Energy Commission. At the American Institute of Physics, Maizell worked as the director of a research project on documentation and communication in physics.

Maizell published academic papers in relation to his work. In 1960, he published the paper "Information Gathering Patterns and Creativity A Study of Research Chemists in an Industrial Research Laboratory". This paper was featured in American Documentation and focused on how creativity can lead to chemists to read more specialized papers, cite older sources, and think more broadly than their "non-creative" counterparts. Additionally, he also published "International Conference for Standards on a Common Language for Machine Searching Translation'' in 1960. This short paper focused on whether or not librarians should be invited to conferences that focus on mechanical information retrieval and how they may benefit the field. In 1979, he published the first edition of his book How to Find Chemical Information: A Guide for Practicing Chemists, Teachers, and Students. His book focuses on approach techniques and various tools for selecting chemical information and its retrieval. Since then, he has published three versions of How to Find Chemical Information and was working on a fourth version up until his death.

Maizell was involved with the American Chemical Society, initially becoming a member in 1951. He was a part of the Division of Chemical Literature and its successor, the Division of Chemical Information. In 1968, he was appointed as a liaison representative from the American Society of Information Science and in 1971, was elected as chairman of the division. In 1975, Maizell was appointed as the Computer Program Complications and Technological Forecasting committee chairman, and was the alternate councilor for the Division of Chemical Information in 1976 and 1977.

Maizell founded Technology Information Consultants, a consulting firm located in New Haven, Connecticut, as a retirement project. His firm focused on chemical information retrieval, specifically with patents, on a global scale.

== Personal life and death ==
Maizell was married to his wife, Mona, with whom he had two children. He died on April 8, 2007 at age 82.
