= Boots on the Ground =

Boots on the Ground may refer to:

- Boots on the Ground (book), a 2003 book by Karl Zinsmeister
- Boots on the Ground (803Fresh song), 2024
- Boots on the Ground (Massive Attack song), 2026
