= Donor intent =

Donor intent is the purpose, sometimes publicly expressed, for which a philanthropist intends a charitable gift or bequest. Donor intent is most often expressed in gift restrictions, terms, or agreements between a donor and donee, but it may also be expressed separately in the words, actions, beliefs, and giving practices of a philanthropist. Donor intent is protected in American law regarding charitable trusts, and trustees' primary fiduciary obligation is to carry out a donor's wishes.

Donor intent is distinguished from “grant compliance”, where donor intent refers to the actions of a grantmaking entity and grant compliance to the actions of a grant recipient.

The term donor intent is commonly used to refer to both the guiding principles of a grantmaking entity and the purposes of a specific gift.

There have been many controversies, including litigation, over donor intent at private foundations, universities, and arts organizations.

== Arguments in favor ==
Donor intent has been defended as a moral obligation between giver and recipient. Defenders of donor intent argue that on a basic ethical level, trustees and gift recipients must do what they have agreed with the original donor to do, explicitly or implicitly: "When donor intent is violated, and particularly when it is egregiously violated, it undermines the bedrock trust on which all charitable giving rests."

Donor intent is thus also defended as necessary to ensure future charitable giving. Future donors might not be inclined to leave money to charitable causes if they see that trustees, grant recipients, or policymakers do not respect the stated intent. Peter Frumkin has written that "as s a policy tool for encouraging future giving, protection of a donor's intent is needed to give future philanthropists the confidence they need to pass their wealth on to others to administer." Carl Schramm, former president of the Ewing Marion Kauffman Foundation, has said on donor intent, "If we dont recognize it, we discourage wealthy people from creating foundations in the future."

Survey data of Americans indicates that donor intent and grant compliance are valued by the public. When asked by Zogby if they would stop giving money to a charity that ignored a request to use a previous donation for a specific purpose, 53% said they would "definitely stop giving" and an additional 25.7% would "probably stop giving." When pollsters asked, "How important do you think showing respect for a donor's wishes is to the ethical governance of nonprofit charitable organizations?," 82.9% considered it "very important," 14.6% "somewhat important."

Finally, respect for donor intent is defended as necessary to preserve pluralism in civil society: "Those who take the idea of donor intent seriously believe that only by protecting the idiosyncratic and at times outlandish ideas of donors will it be possible for philanthropy to innovate and pursue ideas that are either ahead of or behind their time," Frumkin has said.

== Arguments against ==
While not arguing against donor intent per se, Julius Rosenwald (1862-1932) criticized philanthropic funds that are established in perpetuity for a specific purpose only, arguing that narrowly defined statements of donor intent can be superseded as situations change: " I have heard of a fund which provides a baked potato at each meal for each young woman at Bryn Mawr, and of another, dating from one of the great families, which pays for half a loaf of bread deposited each day at the door of each student in one of the colleges of Oxford.... The list of these precisely focused gifts which have lost their usefulness could be extended into volumes."

Courts have intervened when donor intent has been found to be at odds with the law. In Evans v. Abney, the Supreme Court held that Augustus Octavius Bacon's clearly defined gift of a park to Macon, Georgia, for whites only was illegal under the Civil Rights Act of 1964 and so the gift reverted to Bacon's heirs. In cases that donor intent can be modified, courts have latitude to do that under cy pres doctrine.

== Perpetuating donor intent ==
Donor intent is considered virtually impossible to be maintained in perpetuity because of changing situations, erosion of capital, and the distance of successor trustees from a donor. In some instances, however, donor intent has been lost only a short time after a donor's death. Waldemar Nielsen has argued that the Carnegie Corporation of New York swiftly lost the "democratic, hopeful, and constructive" spirit of Andrew Carnegie's giving: "That within five years of his death his Corporation should have turned into a racist and reactionary machine to defend the privileges of the old WASP elite and block the advancement of immigrants and the underprivileged deformed his spirit and intent."

In the early 2000s, the Daniels Fund, established by Bill Daniels, drifted away from what Daniels' trustees considered to be his principles, establishing a multitiered bureaucracy with independent fiefs making decisions by their own rules.

Recognizing what had developed, the board hired a new president, who explained what he was facing: “For example, the staff had unilaterally decided to stop supporting certain organizations, disregarding entirely the fact that Bill had admired and funded those exact organizations during his lifetime.” Ultimately, the board was able to arrest the drift.

Some donors have adopted strategies to prevent philanthropies that they create from drifting from donor intent.

=== Sunsetting versus perpetuity ===
Some donors have attempted to preserve their intent either by "giving while living" or by establishing a date or timeframe in the future by which a foundation must disburse its assets, or "sunset." Chuck Feeney founded the Atlantic Philanthropies, which is scheduled to spend down its assets by 2017.

In 1975, inspired by the controversy over donor intent at the Ford Foundation, John M. Olin adopted plans for the John M. Olin Foundation to disburse its assets by 2005. Olin believed that capitalism was the basis of prosperity and sought to promote conservative political and legal thinking.

The Olin Foundation made a deliberate decision to have a profound impact on its time rather than spreading it out lightly over the perpetual future," adopting a spend-down plan that gave it the spending profile of a foundation with three times as many assets through its sunset.

=== Mission statements ===
A specific mission statement is not always part of establishing a charitable trust.

Carnegie left the Carnegie Corporation's mission vague and open-ended by instructing his successors to "promote the advancement and diffusion of knowledge and understanding" but also granting "full authority to change policies or causes hitherto aided, from time to time, when this, in their opinion, has become necessary or desirable. They shall best conform to my wishes by using their own judgment." In creating the John D. and Catherine T. MacArthur Foundation, John D. MacArthur reportedly told his lawyer, "I'll make [the money]. But you people, after I'm dead, will have to learn how to spend it."

Other donors are much narrower. James B. Duke specified percentages of the annual payout that would go to various categories of giving by the Duke Endowment, including even a formula for reimbursing charity hospitals. Today, some donors leave detailed documents to supplement official mission statements, including reflections on their principles, video statements, and records of their personal giving.

=== Trustees and staff ===
Often, donors select family members, personal business associates, lawyers, or nonprofit leaders to serve on their boards. The Daniels Fund requires trustees to sign a statement affirming that they understand Bill Daniels' donor intent and will honor it in their decision-making on behalf of the foundation. The foundation that was created by Lloyd Noble recruits apprentice trustees to shadow the actual board; some are elected to the board in the future. At meetings of the Duke Endowment's board, James B. Duke's original indenture of trust is read aloud to reinforce his intentions. The John Templeton Foundation has a provision for periodic "donor intent audits" to ensure its officers uphold John Templeton's purposes.

== See also ==
- Charitable trust
- Private foundation
- Ethics of philanthropy
