= Karl Zinsmeister =

American journalist (1959–2026)

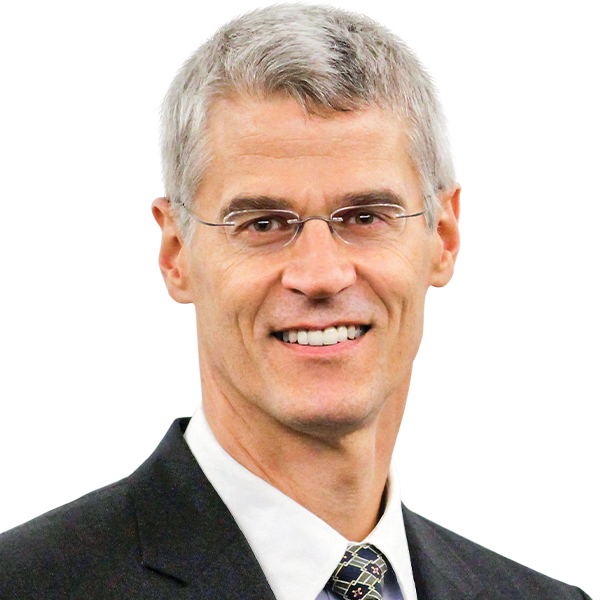

Director of the White House Domestic Policy Council
- In office May 24, 2006 – January 20, 2009
- President: George W. Bush
- Deputy: Jess Sharp
- Preceded by: Claude Allen
- Succeeded by: Melody Barnes

Personal details
- Born: Walter Karl Zinsmeister; April 22, 1959 Baldwinsville, New York, U.S.
- Died: April 30, 2026 (aged 67) Elizabethtown, New York, U.S.
- Party: Republican
- Education: Yale University (BA)
- Website: Official website

Walter Karl Zinsmeister (April 22, 1959 – April 30, 2026) was an American writer, executive, consultant and government official. From 2006 to 2009, he served in the White House as President George W. Bush's chief domestic policy adviser, and Director of the White House Domestic Policy Council. In 2016 he created the Almanac of American Philanthropy, and was an author and an adviser on voluntary action and civil society in the U.S. He was the author of many articles and books, including volumes released as recently as between 2023 and 2025.

== Education and career ==
Zinsmeister was a graduate of Yale University where he studied history and was a member of the Manuscript Society. He also studied at Trinity College, Dublin, in Ireland. He won college rowing championships in the U.S. and Ireland.

His first job in Washington was as a legislative assistant to U.S. Senator Daniel Patrick Moynihan, a New York Democrat. He was named a DeWitt Wallace Fellow, and was appointed to the J.B. Fuqua Chair at the American Enterprise Institute, where he researched topics including social welfare, demographics, economics, and cultural trends.

Zinsmeister's writing has been published in The Atlantic Monthly, Real Clear Politics, the New York Times, and the Wall Street Journal. He was an adviser to research and policy groups, and testified before the U.S. Congress and Presidential commissions on family policy, daycare, farm subsidies, and the Iraq war. He made many appearances on television and radio.

He wrote more than 20 books. Most recently: Dreamland: A love letter to ordinary America is a mix of reporting, memoir, and cultural observation. My West Wing uses his own time in the White House to understand the Presidency of Donald Trump. Backbone offers reports on people across the nation to analyze U.S. populism. Zinsmeister also recently produced a 2024 historical novel about the abolition of slavery, and two children's books. Earlier he wrote two books of embedded Iraq War reporting, a book on charter schools, and other works on education, economics, and population trends. He also created a storytelling cookbook, and a non-fiction comic book.

In 2016, a 1,342-page reference book created by Zinsmeister, the Almanac of American Philanthropy, was published after three years of research. The book has been described as the authoritative reference on private giving in the U.S. He created a Compact Edition of the Almanac of American Philanthropy in 2017.

== The American Enterprise ==
Zinsmeister was editor-in-chief of The American Enterprise, a national magazine covering politics, business, and culture.

Zinsmeister was an embedded journalist during the 2003 invasion of Iraq, and then served three additional months-long embeddings with combat units during the insurgency stage of the war. He shot a documentary film about soldiers in Iraq, called "WARRIORS", which was funded by the Corporation for Public Broadcasting and nationally broadcast by PBS.

He wrote three books of Iraq reporting. Boots on the Ground: A Month with the 82nd Airborne in the Battle for Iraq, published in August 2003, was the first Iraq War book published by an embedded journalist. Dawn Over Baghdad: How the U.S. Military is Using Bullets and Ballots to Remake Iraq was one of the first portrayals of the insurgency phase of the Iraq War. Combat Zone: True Tales of G.I.s in Iraq was a rare non-fiction graphic novel from Marvel Comics.

== White House employment ==
During his years in the West Wing, as director of the Domestic Policy Council, Zinsmeister was involved in policy making on topics like the 2008 mortgage and student-loan credit crises, immigration reform, housing, biotechnology and stem cell policies, airport congestion, education reform, transportation issues, health policy, faith-based schooling, an 8,000-job layoff in Ohio, poverty, crime, family policy, civil rights, and veterans affairs.

Some published work produced by the White House Domestic Policy Council under Zinsmeister:

- Dole/Shalala Commission report on improving care for wounded warriors
- White House report on disadvantaged children served by faith-based urban schools
- White House report on progress in stem-cell science
- Immigration reform bill of 2007

== Post-White House career ==
After leaving the White House, from 2009 to 2010, Zinsmeister became an executive in his native region of upstate New York with L. & J. G. Stickley, an Arts and Crafts furniture manufacturing firm founded by Gustav Stickley. His 2023 book about the Stickley brothers and the Arts & Crafts movement in America, Craftsmen on a Mission, was based on a lecture he delivered at Robert A.M. Stern Architects. In 2011, he wrote a White House memoir. A storytelling cookbook, regional culture guide, and celebration of localism that he co-created with two of his three children, called Finger Lakes Feast, was published in 2012 and widely reviewed.

Zinsmeister returned to Washington to serve as vice president at the Philanthropy Roundtable, an association of donors, where he produced more than a dozen books, 40 magazine issues, 50 podcast episodes, and many other products.

Books he edited in that same period include two examining the country's best programs for job re-training and helping difficult populations like the homeless, released prisoners, former addicts, and welfare recipients succeed in the workforce. Catholic School Renaissance, analyzes the revival of inner-city Catholic schools and why that is important to the nation. Serving Those Who Served is a manual for the new field of philanthropy for veterans, service members, and their families—where Zinsmeister was a leader, growing out of his military reporting and his veterans work at the White House.

Zinsmeister conducted in-depth research on the inventive power and importance of science philanthropy, which has powered innovations ranging from the world's greatest telescopes to medical breakthroughs like blood typing; organ transplants; vaccines for polio, yellow fever, and many other diseases; fundamental genetic discoveries; and seminal brain research; along with many other discoveries. He uncovered much nearly unknown American philanthropic history, including essays on medical research, the importance of anonymity to private giving, even the existence of "national-security philanthropy" in the U.S.—by which donors have made crucial contributions to defense of the nation. He analyzed who gives most to charity in the U.S., and tracked the rise of donations by Americans for overseas development work. He catalogued the private philanthropy that was crucial to the creation of the state of Israel.

His biographies of philanthropists include profiles of Julius Rosenwald, George Eastman, Alfred Loomis, Benjamin Rush, the Tappan brothers, and Oseola McCarty.

In recent years Zinsmeister returned to authoring a wide range of books. My West Wing combines White House memoir with discussion of current politics. Backbone: Why American Populism Should Be Welcomed, Not Feared is current political analysis. The Brothers is an historical novel. Craftsmen on a Mission is cultural history. Micro Aid is embedded reporting from Kurdistan, Georgia, and Serbia. A Time for Action and Virginia Warbler's Valiant Journey are children's books. He also recently published essays in periodicals like the Wall Street Journal.

== Personal life and death ==
Zinsmeister was married and had three children. He lived on a boat in the Sea Islands of South Carolina, and a cabin in the Adirondack Mountains of New York.

Zinsmeister died on April 30, 2026, at the age of 67.

Political offices
Preceded by Claude Allen	Director of the Domestic Policy Council; 2006–2009	Succeeded by Melody Barnes
