= Trust-based philanthropy =

Type of philanthropy

Trust-based philanthropy is an approach in philanthropy that emphasizes shifting the power imbalance between funders and nonprofit leaders toward greater trust, shared power, and mutual accountability. Unlike traditional philanthropy, a trust-based approach takes a grantee-centric stance, encouraging funders to become partners to and enablers of nonprofits’ self-determined goals. It also reduces some of the burdens typically imposed upon grantees, through core practices such as providing unrestricted funding, offering multi-year grants, and minimizing administrative tasks. These practices allow grantees to spend more time on their work, allocate resources efficiently and pivot strategies when new challenges or opportunities arise. In addition to grantmaking structures, trust-based philanthropy employs a holistic framework where dimensions of culture, leadership, and organizational practices.

== History ==
Trust-based philanthropy was first introduced in 2014 by the San Francisco-based Whitman Institute which had spent years advocating for grantmaking approaches that favor giving grantees more decision-making power. Although many of the trust-based philanthropy practices had been employed by grantmakers prior to the naming of this approach, the description of the collection of practices helped to normalize this more relational approach. In 2020, the Whitman Institute partnered with a coalition of U.S.-based foundations to launch the Trust-Based Philanthropy Project, a five-year initiative to provide peer-to-peer education and knowledge sharing amongst funders who were interested in adopting trust-based philanthropy practices.

In 2020, the Dorothy A. Johnson Center listed trust-based philanthropy as one of 11 trends in philanthropy. Since then a growing number of foundations have adopted trust-based approaches around the world.

== Relationship with traditional philanthropy ==
The trust-based model counters traditional philanthropy, which often operates through funders’ prerogatives, tying funds to specific projects and imposing rigorous reporting requirements. By contrast, trust-based philanthropy relies on building open, trustful, and mutually-accountable relationships between funders and grantees.

These relationships foster a collaborative environment, enabling funders to gain a deeper understanding of grantees' needs. This approach can be seen as more strategic, as it acknowledges the expertise of nonprofit leaders and provides them with the latitude to make timely decisions in response to shifting conditions.

== Response by donors ==
While it existed before the pandemic began, the trend of trust-based giving has been accelerated by the COVID-19 pandemic. Many funders reduced reporting requirements, converted restricted grants to general support, and streamlined application processes, allowing nonprofits to adapt swiftly and allocate resources where they were most urgently needed. Over 800 organizations explicitly embraced the trend by signing onto a pledge to adopt trust-based practices. In 2025, responding to funding rollbacks and a new political climate, more than 70 funders signed onto a commitment to “move in solidarity with nonprofits, mobilize money, and nurture possibility” through trust-based practices.

Despite the positive reception of the trust-based philanthropy approach amongst a vast swath of the philanthropic sector, some have criticized the basis of the approach. The Philanthropy Roundtable, for instance, rejects the notion that funders need to address power dynamics in their grantmaking with what they call "diversity mandates." Philanthropy-focused Alliance Magazine in April 2022 criticized trust-based philanthropy as parochial, perpetuating inequalities and too focused on U.S.-centric philanthropic practices.

== Challenges ==
A challenge in adopting the practice is maintaining meaningful impact measurement while reducing reporting requirements for the grantees. Foundations must balance the need for accountability with a commitment to trust, often by finding alternative methods, such as open conversations or simplified reporting options, to ensure they stay informed without imposing excessive administrative burdens.
