= Combat Zone: True Tales of G.I.s in Iraq =

Combat Zone: True Tales of GIs in Iraq is a graphic novel written by Karl Zinsmeister. Penciller Dan Jurgens illustrated the graphic novel with cover art contributed by Esad Ribic. The title was released as a single volume trade paperback in 2005. The graphic novel depicted Zinsmeister's journalistic reports on his time with the 82nd Airborne. Zinsmeister's initial account of his time with the 82nd Airborne was recounted in his book Boots on the Ground: a month with the 82nd Airborne in the battle for Iraq.
