= John M. Olin Foundation =

Defunct conservative US grant-making foundation

- Formation: 1953
- Founder: John M. Olin
- Dissolved: November 29, 2005
- Type: Conservative grant-making foundation
- Headquarters: Manhattan, New York City, U.S.

The John M. Olin Foundation was a conservative American grant-making foundation established in 1953 by John M. Olin, president of the Olin Industries chemical and munitions manufacturing businesses. Unlike most other foundations, it was charged to spend all of its assets within a generation of Olin's death, for fear of mission drift over time and to preserve donor intent. It made its last grant in the summer of 2005 and officially disbanded on November 29, 2005. It had disbursed over $370 million in funding, primarily to conservative think tanks, media outlets, and law programs at influential universities. It is most notable for its early support and funding of the law and economics movement and the Federalist Society. "All in all, the Federalist Society has been one of the best investments the foundation ever made," wrote the Foundation to its trustees in 2003.

== Mission statement ==
According to the official website, "the general purpose of the John M. Olin Foundation is to provide support for projects that reflect or are intended to strengthen the economic, political and cultural institutions upon which the American heritage of constitutional government and private enterprise is based. The Foundation also seeks to promote a general understanding of these institutions by encouraging the thoughtful study of the connections between economic and political freedoms, and the cultural heritage that sustains them."

== History ==
From 1958 to 1966, the foundation was used to launder money for the Central Intelligence Agency, which funded covert anti-communist propaganda. The fund was largely inactive until 1969, when John M. Olin was disturbed by the Willard Straight Hall takeover at his alma mater, Cornell University. At the age of 80, he decided that he must pour his time and resources into preserving the free market system.

The Foundation is most notable for its early support and funding of the law and economics movement, a discipline that applies incentive-based thinking and cost-benefit analysis to the field of legal theory.

The executive director of the Foundation in its early years was conservative activist Michael S. Joyce, who left to head the similar Bradley Foundation. William E. Simon, a leverage buyout pioneer who was United States Secretary of the Treasury under Presidents Richard Nixon and Gerald Ford, was president of the Foundation from 1977 until his death in 2000. He frequently discussed the foundation's commitment to supporting the "counter-intelligentsia". Conservative scholar James Piereson was the last executive director and secretary.

The foundation supported conservative thinkers such as Heather Mac Donald of the Manhattan Institute; Mac Donald is the John M. Olin Fellow at this New York City–based institution. In 2005, following longstanding plans, the foundation announced its final grants and closed its doors. The foundation closed in the same year as the Franklin W. Olin Foundation, which was established by John Olin's father, Franklin W. Olin. The Franklin W. Olin Foundation also shut down for donor intent reasons, but the two foundations were entirely independent and unrelated, except for the family connection of their founders.

According to the Philanthropy Roundtable, the Olin Foundation "dispensed hundreds of millions of dollars to scholars, think tanks, publications, and other organizations" and "shaped the direction and aided the growth of the modern conservative movement that first sprang into visibility in the 1980s." According to the New York Observer, the Foundation distributed "grants to conservative think tanks and intellectuals—the architects of today's sprawling right-wing movement—for a quarter-century."

== Notable persons ==
- James Piereson – past executive director and board member
- Peter M. Flanigan – past director
- Charles F. Knight – past director
- William E. Simon - past president

== Sponsored professorships ==
There are several dozen John M. Olin Professors at universities and law schools around the world, including:

- John M. Olin Professor at Fordham University (formerly Ernest van den Haag)
- John M. Olin Professor at George Mason University (formerly Walter E. Williams)
- John M. Olin Professor at Yale Law School (currently George L. Priest)
- John M. Olin Professor at Georgetown University (formerly Walter F. Berns)

== See also ==
- Donors Trust
