= Claude Allen =

American attorney and government official (born 1960)

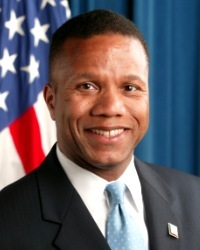

Director of the Domestic Policy Council
- In office January 5, 2005 – February 9, 2006
- President: George W. Bush
- Deputy: Tevi Troy
- Preceded by: Margaret Spellings
- Succeeded by: Karl Zinsmeister

19th United States Deputy Secretary of Health and Human Services
- In office May 26, 2001 – January 5, 2005
- President: George W. Bush
- Preceded by: Kevin Thurm
- Succeeded by: Alex Azar

8th Virginia Secretary of Health and Human Resources
- In office January 17, 1998 – May 26, 2001
- Governor: Jim Gilmore
- Preceded by: Robert C. Metcalf
- Succeeded by: Louis F. Rossiter

Personal details
- Born: Claude Alexander Allen Jr. October 11, 1960 (age 66) Philadelphia, Pennsylvania, U.S.
- Party: Republican
- Spouse: Jannese
- Education: University of North Carolina, Chapel Hill (BA); Duke University (JD)

Claude Alexander Allen Jr. (born October 11, 1960) is an American attorney who was appointed to be Assistant to the President of the United States for Domestic Policy by George W. Bush.

Allen grew up in Philadelphia and graduated from the University of North Carolina at Chapel Hill and Duke University School of Law. He began his legal career in 1990 as a clerk for a federal judge, then was an associate with Baker Botts from 1991 to 1995 and the office of the Attorney General of Virginia from 1995 to 1998. From 1998 to 2001 Allen served as Secretary of Health and Human Services for the State of Virginia, and then became Deputy Secretary of the United States Department of Health and Human Services under the George W. Bush administration.

Allen was appointed as Assistant to the President in January 2005. Allen then resigned February 9, 2006, stating he wanted to spend more time with his family. On March 10, 2006, news broke that Allen had been repeatedly stealing from retail stores Target and Hecht's by engaging in return fraud. Allen was cited by police for shoplifting on January 2, 2006, which triggered an investigation that resulted in Allen's arrest on felony counts of theft on March 9, 2006. On August 4, 2006, as part of a plea bargain, Allen pleaded guilty to one misdemeanor count of theft.

== Early life ==
Allen, a native of Philadelphia, grew up in a two-bedroom apartment in a working-class section of northwest Washington, D.C. He attended Archbishop Carroll High School, a Roman Catholic school. His mother worked part-time at a Catholic school; his father worked for a plumbing supply business. In a television interview, Allen said "Probably the vast majority of the kids who grew up in our neighborhood were either strung out on drugs or in jail or dead." Claude attended Jesse O. Sanderson High School in Raleigh, North Carolina from 1975 to 1978 where he participated in student government and ran track.

Allen has a twin brother named Floyd, who played football and was inducted into the Sanderson Athletic Hall of Fame in 2011. In 1982, Allen graduated from the University of North Carolina at Chapel Hill with a B.A.

== Career ==
Allen grew up in a Democratic household, but he took a job after college as press secretary for Bill Cobey, a Republican Congressional candidate in North Carolina. He switched parties, saying later, in an interview, "I realized after the fact that I agree more with the Republican Party platform, that it talked about independence, that it talked about individual responsibility, individual rights, it talked about the ability to guarantee opportunities, not outcomes."

Allen subsequently began working for Republican Senator Jesse Helms, of North Carolina; he was Helms' campaign spokesman in 1984. From 1985 to 1987, Allen was a staff member of the Senate Foreign Relations Committee.

== Legal career ==
Allen returned to school in 1987. He graduated from Duke University School of Law with a J.D. in 1990. He also received a Master of Laws Degree from Duke University School of Law.

From 1990 to 1991, Allen was a law clerk for David B. Sentelle, a judge on the U. S. Court of Appeals for the D.C. Circuit, famous for his role in the Whitewater investigation. Allen met and became a protege of Clarence Thomas, who was a judge on that court at the time Allen was clerking there.

After his clerkship, Allen became an associate at Baker Botts in Washington, D.C., from 1991 to 1995. He then served in the Virginia Attorney General's Office from 1995 to 1998, before becoming Secretary of Health and Human Resources for the Commonwealth of Virginia.

== White House service ==
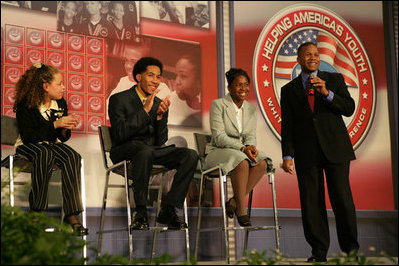
Claude Allen, October 27, 2005, at Howard University during a White House Conference on Helping America's Youth.

In 2001, Allen was appointed as the Deputy Secretary of the U.S. Department of Health and Human Services.

In 2004, Allen was nominated by President George W. Bush to become a federal judge on the Fourth Circuit Court of Appeals. His nomination was opposed by numerous educational, religious, and racial groups, including People for the American Way, the NAACP, and the National Organization for Women. The American Bar Association rated him as partially "not qualified". His nomination was stalled in the Senate Judiciary Committee and lapsed on December 8, 2005.

Allen was then appointed to the position of Assistant to the President for Domestic Policy in January 2005 where he was responsible for providing advice on all non-economic policy issues including education, health care, labor, housing, veterans, HIV/AIDS, and other domestic issues. While Head of the Domestic Policy Council, Allen jointly oversaw the White House Task Force that coordinated response to Hurricane Katrina along with the Homeland Security Council.

== Policy positions ==
Allen has said of condom use, "It's like telling your child, 'Don't use the car,' but then leaving the keys in the Lamborghini and saying, 'But if you do, buckle up.'"

Allen is anti-abortion. Journalist Doug Ireland wrote that when serving as Health and Human Services Commissioner in Virginia, Allen opposed certain legislation because it included taxpayer funding for abortions.

According to NNDB.com, "In 1984, as a press aide to Jesse Helms, Allen told the Greensboro News and Record: 'We could expound on and undertake a campaign against Jim Hunt's connections with the homosexuals, the labor union connection, the radical feminist connection, the socialist connection.'

Subsequent reports claim that Allen's precise words had actually been: 'We could go back and do the same thing with the queers[...]' [Allen then] he called the reporter back and apologized for his choice of words."

== Arrest and plea ==
Allen was apprehended by Germantown Target store loss prevention manager Pete Schomburg on January 2, 2006. According to the charging document, Allen "admitted to Agent Schomburg that he was committing fraudulent returns". He was not formally charged until March after a review of security video and credit card activity showed similar behavior dating back to 2005. Police said he took items from the shelf and then 'returned them' for more than $5,000 to his credit card through about 25 similar transactions at other stores. He pleaded guilty to theft in August.

In September 2011, the D.C. Court of Appeals suspended his license to practice law in D.C. for one year, after his license to practice law was suspended for 30 days in Virginia and Pennsylvania. The opinion gave much discussion as to whether the act was one of moral turpitude, concluding that it was not.

=== Reactions to resignation and arrest ===
On February 10, 2006, the day following Allen's resignation, The Washington Times reported that "According to a military source, Allen resigned to protest the White House's refusal to lean on the Pentagon about the issue [of allowing military chaplains to be more explicit about their faith]." However, Allen denied these reports, stating that he had resigned to spend more time with his family.

After the arrest, Mallon Snyder, Allen's attorney, said he would prove the felony theft scheme allegations are "a series of misunderstandings."

President George W. Bush said on March 11, 2006, "If the allegations are true, Claude Allen did not tell my Chief of Staff and legal counsel the truth, and that's deeply disappointing. If the allegations are true, something went wrong in Claude Allen's life, and that is really sad. When I heard the story last night I was shocked. And my first reaction was one of disappointment, deep disappointment that—if it's true—that we were not fully informed. But it was also one—shortly thereafter, I felt really sad for the Allen family."

The weekend of March 11–12, 2006, Allen's church, Covenant Life Church in Gaithersburg, Maryland, voiced support for their congregant. Senior Pastor Joshua Harris said that the church's pastors had remained in close contact with Allen since news of his arrest broke that Friday, March 10. Harris said, "Our role is not to provide legal counsel. Our concern is for his soul. Our desire—and Claude shares this—is for him to walk with humility and integrity."

On March 11, 2006, Trey Ellis wrote an opinion on The Huffington Post called "When Black Republicans Go Bad". The piece suggested that Allen, along with other prominent black Republicans, "stake out ultra-right-wing positions to prove their bona fides to their white superiors."

== Personal life ==
Allen, a longtime evangelical Christian, is married to Jannese Mitchell Allen, and is the father of four children; including Claude Allen III, Lila-Cjoan Allen and Christian Isaiah Allen. The Allens are active members of the Covenant Life Church in Gaithersburg.

His son Claude Allen III pleaded guilty to murder on September 3, 2014, but was declared not legally responsible and was committed to a psychiatric institution.

Political offices
| Preceded by Robert C. Metcalf | Virginia Secretary of Health and Human Resources; 1998–2001 | Succeeded by Louis Rossiter |
| Preceded by Margaret Spellings | Director of the Domestic Policy Council; 2005–2006 | Succeeded by Karl Zinsmeister |
