= Western Cartridge Company =

Manufacturer of ammunition

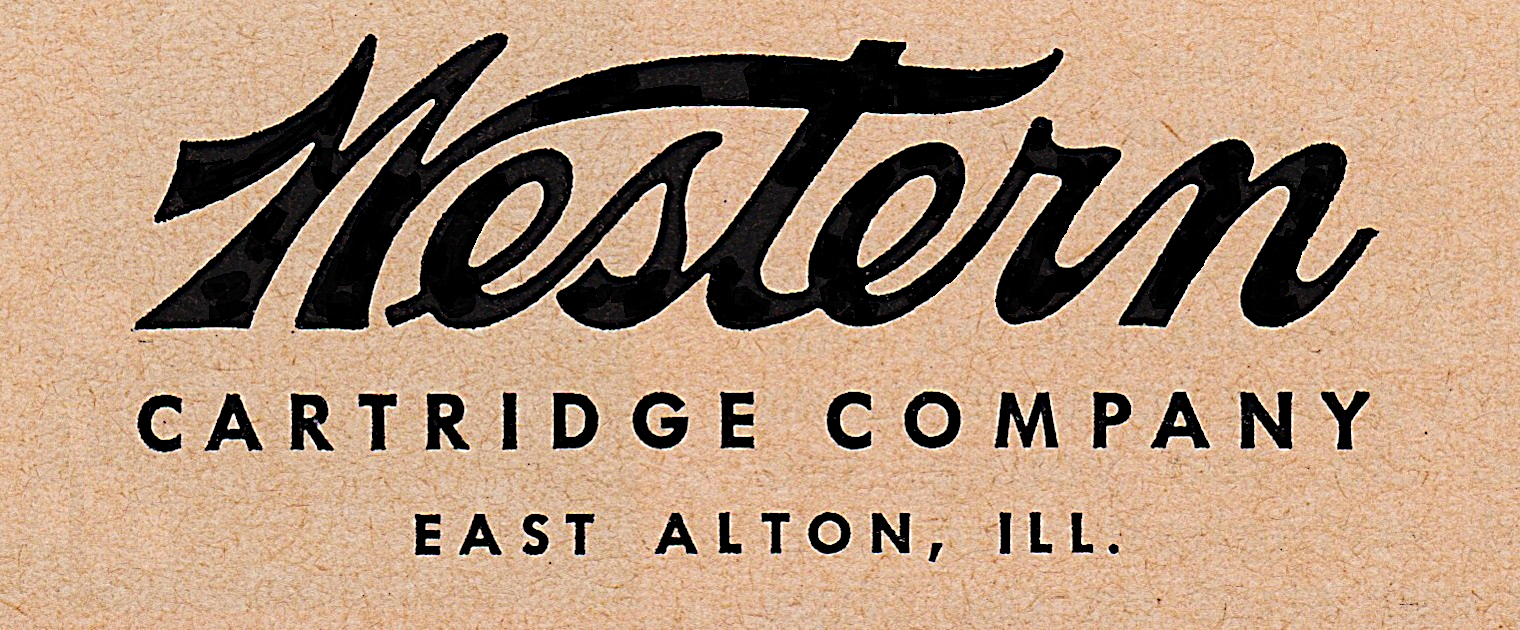

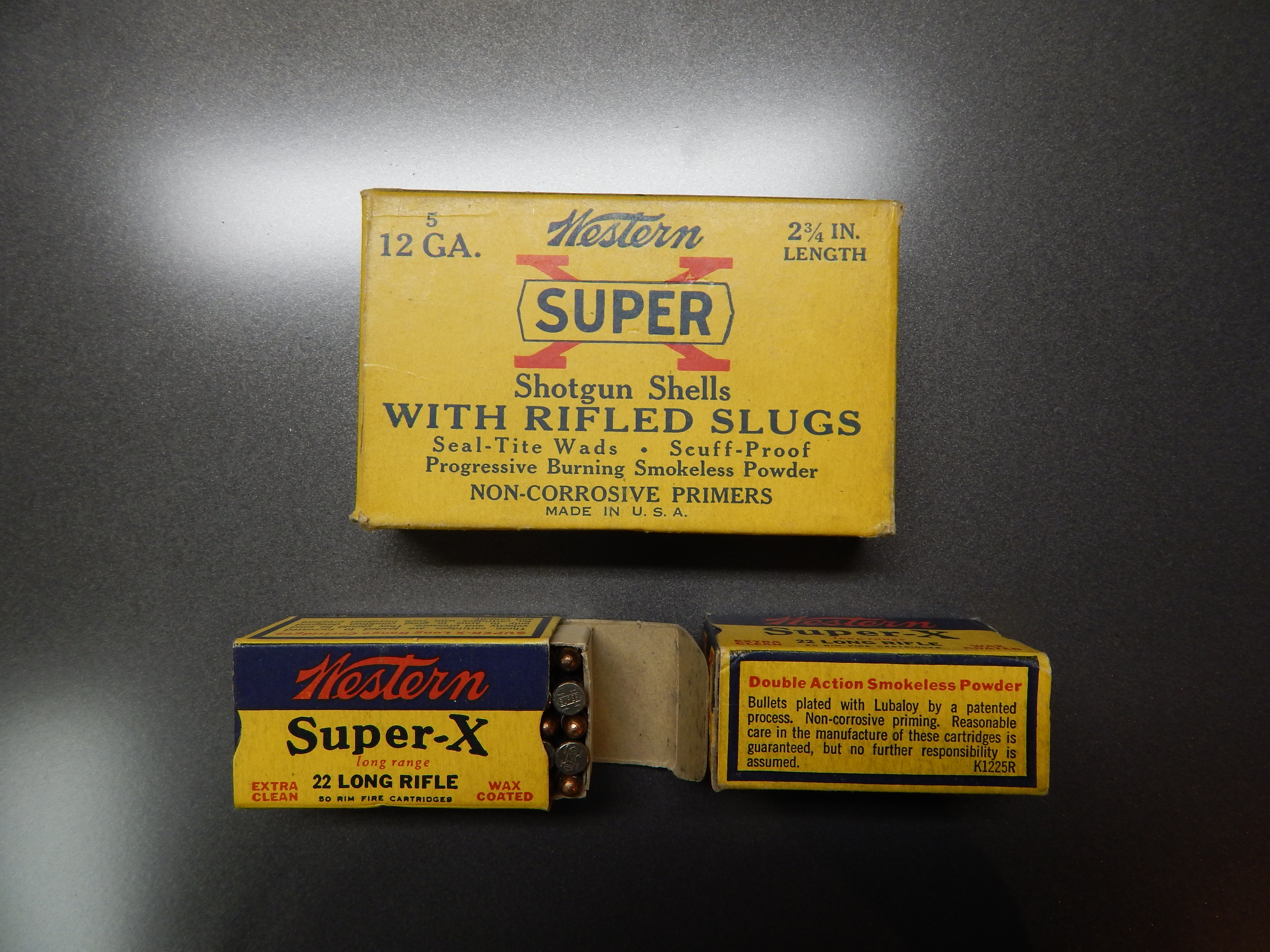
- Typical consumer packaging from the Western Cartridge Company, c. 1960
- Company type: Private
- Industry: Arms industry
- Founded: 1898
- Founder: Franklin W. Olin
- Fate: Merged onto Olin Corporation
- Headquarters: East Alton, Illinois, U.S.
- Products: Small arms and ammunition
- Website: www.olin.com

The Western Cartridge Company was an American manufacturer of small arms and ammunition formerly based in East Alton, Illinois. Founded in 1898, it was the forerunner of the Olin Corporation, formed in 1944, of which Western was absorbed into. Prior to that, Western acquired the Winchester Repeating Arms Company after Winchester went into receivership in 1931. The two would merge in 1935 to form Winchester-Western.

== History ==
Franklin W. Olin received an engineering degree from Cornell University in 1886. After working at powder mills in the eastern United States, he was one of several investors establishing the Equitable Powder Company in 1892 at East Alton, Illinois. Production of blasting powder for southern Illinois coal mining began in 1893.

Olin formed the Western Cartridge Company in 1898 to manufacture sporting rifle powder and shotgun shells for settlers of the Great Plains. The shotgun shells used primers manufactured by larger eastern ammunition firms. When the firms with primer manufacturing facilities raised primer prices in 1900 to reduce competition from independent shotgun shell assembly plants, the Western Cartridge Company formed the Union Cap and Chemical Company (UCC) as a joint venture with Austin Cartridge Company of Ohio. UCC manufactured primers, blasting caps, and .22 and .32 caliber rimfire cartridges at East Alton. Similar manufacturing procedures for these products included fabrication of sheet metal cups and filling portions of those cups with primary explosive.

Rimfire cartridges bore a UCC headstamp, and product packaging included a Maltese cross trademark. The purchase of Alliance Cartridge Company in 1907 allowed UCC's merger into the Western Cartridge Company. The early Maltese Cross trademark from the earlier Union Cap & Chemical Company was changed in 1909–1910 to a diamond with the Western name inside. This logo carried on into the 1930s. The well known Super-X branding arrived in the mid-1920s on shotgun shells and in 1930–1931 on .22 rim fire. This branding referenced the "X" ring on a target and was used only on high velocity cartridges.

== Expansion ==
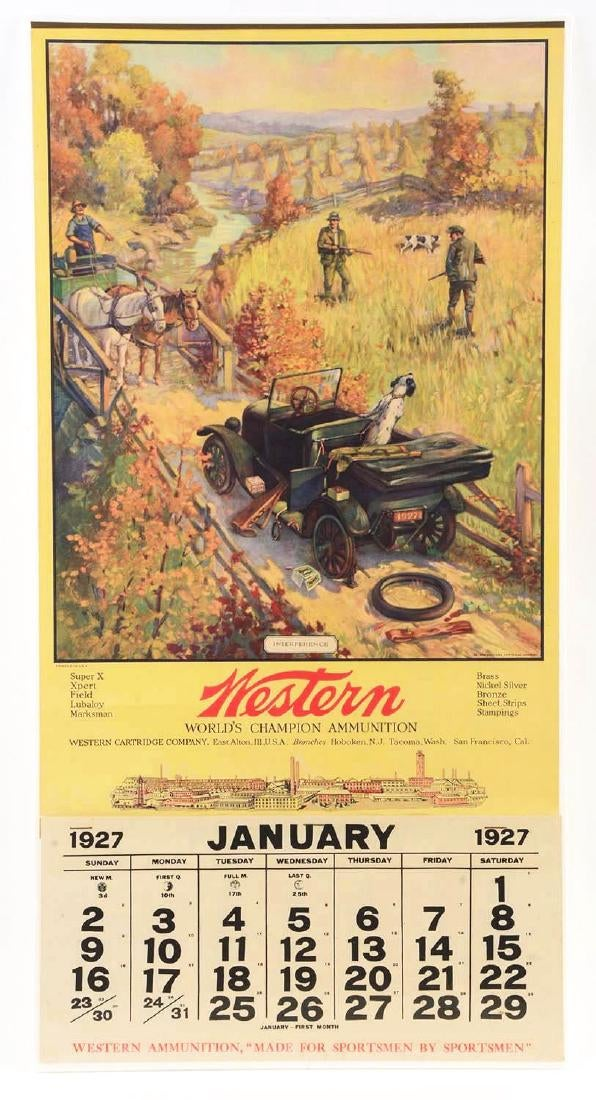
Western calendar, 1927

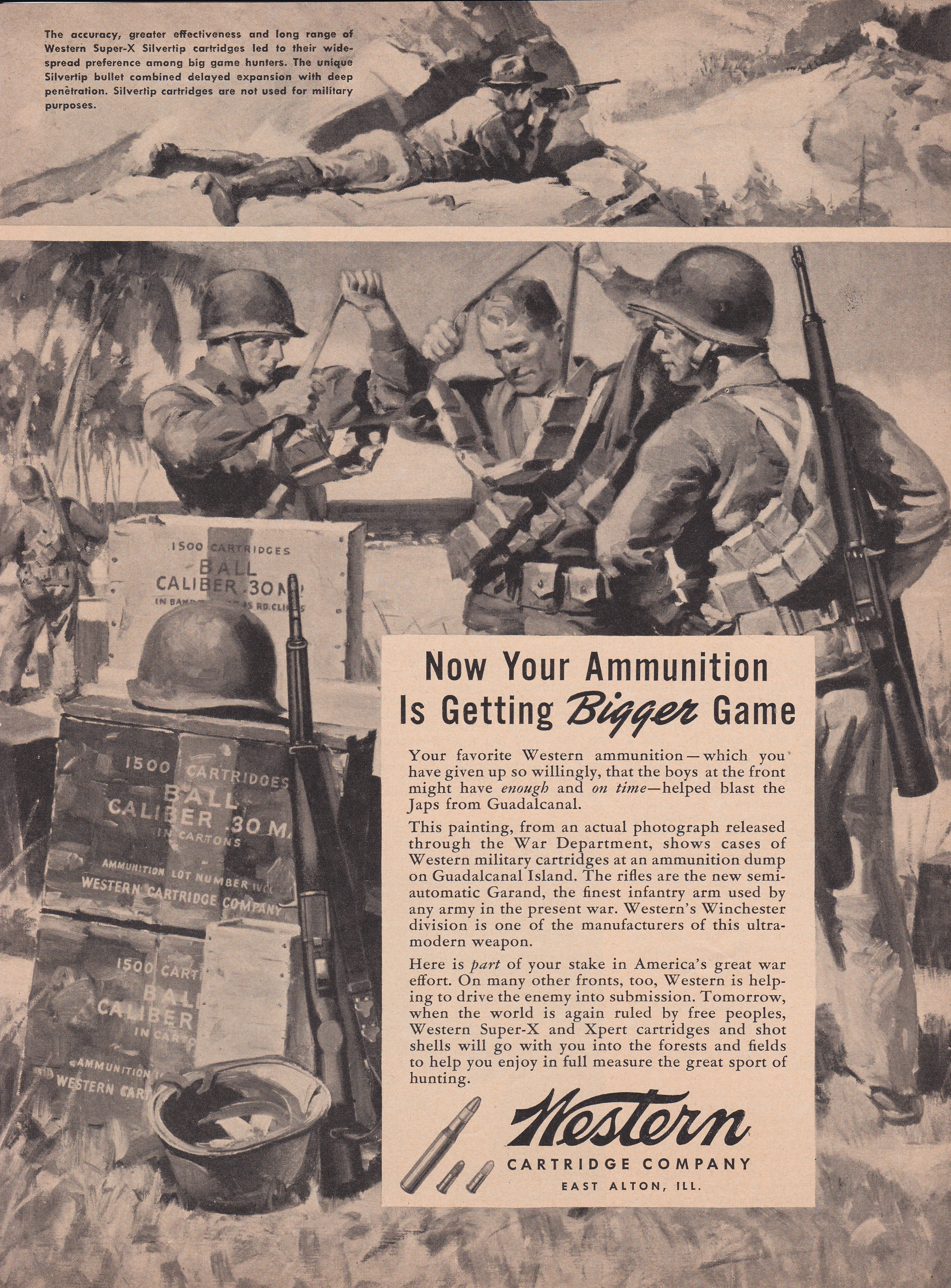
World War II era advertisement explaining ammunition shortages and the company's contribution to the war effort

John Olin, the son of founder Franklin W. Olin, improved shotgun cartridge designs in the 1920s by using harder shot and progressive burning powder. Western produced 3 billion rounds of ammunition in World War II, and the Winchester subsidiary developed the U.S. M1 carbine and produced the carbine and the M1 rifle during the war. Western ranked 35th among United States corporations in the value of wartime production contracts. Cartridges made by Western are stamped WCC. Western Cartridge Company produced the now collectible "Western Xpert" brand of shotgun shells in both 12 and 16 gauge sizes.

== Labor relations ==
The company faced union activity and strikes in 1941 and 1942, at a time when it held $8.5 million in defense contracts.

Civil rights activist Clarence M. Mitchell Jr. noted in 1944 that the company did not hire African-American workers. Franklin Roosevelt's Committee on Fair Employment Practice had held hearings and tried to have the company hire black workers in 1943, but the community, owners and white employees refused.
