= Almanac of American Philanthropy =

Reference book

- Author: Karl Zinsmeister
- Language: English
- Subject: Philanthropy in the United States
- Genre: Reference book
- Published: January 8, 2016
- Publisher: Philanthropy Roundtable
- Publication place: United States
- Media type: Print
- Pages: 1,342
- ISBN: 978-0-9861474-5-6
- Website: www.philanthropyroundtable.org/almanac-of-american-philanthropy/

The Almanac of American Philanthropy is a reference book published by the Philanthropy Roundtable donors group in 2016 to capture the history, purpose, effects, and modern direction of private philanthropy in the United States.

The author, Karl Zinsmeister, a vice president of the Philanthropy Roundtable, was formerly chief domestic policy advisor to President George W. Bush. The writing has a libertarian lean. The almanac records the achievements of American philanthropy, profiles influential donors, presents statistics and polling results, lists books and recommended readings in the field, provides a selection of philanthropy quotations, and summarizes modern approaches to charitable giving in the United States.

== Overview ==
The Almanac of American Philanthropy chronicles 380 years of private giving in America. Its sections include:

- Author Karl Zinsmeister's introductory essay, written in the first person, which praises private philanthropy over government programs. It encapsulates philanthropy's influence on American society, addresses common criticisms of philanthropy, and investigates the benefits of charitable giving
- A list of the most significant U.S. living donors of the last 15 years
- A Hall of Fame of great historic donors
- Descriptive entries on more than 900 major achievements in American philanthropy from 1636 to 2015, organized by sectors
- Brief sketches of philanthropic literature, classic and recent, divided into themes
- A collection of quotations about giving
- The results of an original 2015 national poll of Americans on topics related to philanthropy. Among other findings, the poll found that 47 percent of Americans chose private charity as their first choice for solving a social problem, compared to 32 percent who chose government
- Charts and graphs with text explanations, depicting data and trends in philanthropy
- An analysis of which demographic and regional groups are America's more generous givers. According to the almanac, the wealthiest 1% of Americans make one-third of all charitable donations
- An analysis of the U.S. tax treatment of charitable donations
- A timeline of the most significant events in U.S. philanthropy over four centuries of national development

Philanthropy in the U.S. is a major part of the economy with $360 billion given every year and 8 billion hours of time volunteered. Philanthropy is a major cultural force in the U.S., handling many social responsibilities, thanks to individual giving levels that are two to twenty times higher than in other comparable nations.

== Author ==
Karl Zinsmeister, vice president for publications at the Philanthropy Roundtable, is the primary author. He was chief domestic policy advisor to President George W. Bush, and the former editor of The American Enterprise magazine of the American Enterprise Institute, a conservative think tank. He has authored eleven books, including works on charter schools and public policy philanthropy, embedded reporting on the Iraq War, and a Marvel Comics nonfiction graphic novel. He has written for publications including the Wall Street Journal, the New York Times, and the Atlantic, and he produced a PBS documentary film.

== Distribution ==
Three thousand copies of the almanac were distributed to academic and public libraries and 13,000 copies were sent to donors and U.S. foundations worth at least $50 million. Hard copies of the book are available for sale and its content is also available for free online.

== Reception ==
Opinion columnist Jeff Jacoby of The Boston Globe called the almanac "the first definitive work on the history, variety, and impact of private giving in the United States." The Orange County Register wrote that the almanac "shatters myths about the stinginess of the wealthy and bleeding-heart liberals’ monopoly on compassion." Booklist, published by the American Library Association, recommended the almanac as a "comprehensive, current, accurate, well-organized reference on private giving in the U.S." A review in Choice magazine of the Association of College and Research Libraries did not recommend the almanac, calling it "extensive" and "entertaining" but "greatly hindered by its subjectivity and political bias".
