= Ethics of philanthropy =

Ethical issues specific to philanthropy

Philanthropy poses a number of ethical issues:

- How donors should choose beneficiaries and ensure that their donations are effective.
- Acceptable marketing practices for grant seekers.
- A recipient may violate the donor's intent in spirit or in law.
- A donor's activities may be considered incompatible with those of the institution's mission.
- Specifically, a recipient may be perceived as complicit with or oblivious to a donor's unethical practices, thus tainting its own good name, especially when an institution grants naming rights.
- A donor may receive a quid pro quo for all or part of a donation.

== Giving effectively ==
Choosing suitable recipients of philanthropy, and ensuring that the aid is effective, is a difficult ethical problem, first addressed by Aristotle.

== Marketing practices ==
Ethical questions include:

- how to compensate fund-raising agents;
- how to compete with other causes;
- how much deception, if any, is acceptable;
- whether some images ("pornography of poverty") should not be used, even if they are effective.

== Donor intent ==
Many gifts are accompanied by a statement of intent, which may be a formal, legal agreement, or a less formal understanding. To what extent the recipient must respect that intent is an ethical and legal issue, especially as circumstances and social norms change.

== Incompatible missions ==
When a person's activities are incompatible with an institution's mission, associating with them or accepting donations from them may be considered inappropriate or dishonest marketing (cf. greenwashing), a form of conflict of interest.

For example, children's museums generally refuse sponsorship from manufacturers of junk food.

Protests against David Koch's support for climate change denial led to his resignation from the board of the American Museum of Natural History.

== Tainted donors ==
Funds derived from, and donors engaged in, unethical, immoral, or criminal activities pose a problem for the recipient, as accepting a donation or continuing to benefit from it may be interpreted as benefiting from or ignoring the disreputable activity. Such donations have been characterized as "toxic philanthropy".

This is an issue for the donor's behavior both before and after the donation. Institutions may react by returning the money, removing the acknowledgement, or by keeping the money.

The Sackler family has been a major donor to many cultural and educational institutions, and has had many buildings and programs named for it. Their association with the opioid epidemic has caused many activists to urge the recipients to remove the Sackler name from their buildings and programs, and some institutions have announced that they will remove the name or accept no further donations from the family. Harvard has said that it will not remove the name from the Arthur M. Sackler Museum because "Dr. Arthur Sackler died before Oxycontin was developed. His family sold their interest in the company before the drug was developed.... he had absolutely no relationship to it".

Similarly, the sex offender Jeffrey Epstein was a major donor to many university programs, even after his conviction for sex crimes. After it emerged that the director of the MIT Media Lab, Joi Ito, was aware of Epstein's misdeeds and took steps to solicit donations while hiding their source, Ito resigned. MIT and Harvard have both initiated reviews of donations by Epstein. The MIT review concluded that:

Since MIT had no policy or processes for handling controversial donors in place at the time, the decision to accept Epstein's post-conviction donations cannot be judged to be a policy violation. But it is clear that the decision was the result of collective and significant errors in judgment that resulted in serious damage to the MIT community.

== Quid pro quo ==
Donors are generally acknowledged publicly for their donations, which benefits their reputation. It has been argued that this should be treated as a business transaction. Many philosophers have argued that donations should be anonymous for this reason. Receiving something of value in return for a donation is also considered both legally and ethically a quid pro quo.

== See also ==
- Charity fraud
- Charity scandals
- List of Philanthropists
- Philanthropy in the United States
- Effective altruism
