= Madison Center for Educational Affairs =

American public policy organization

The Madison Center for Educational Affairs was a non-profit public policy organization that is the result of a 1990 merger between the Institute For Educational Affairs and the Madison Center. As of 2009, the organization was defunct, reporting no assets or income or federal non-profit tax filings.

The Institute For Education Affairs was founded in 1978 by William E. Simon and Irving Kristol. Philanthropy Roundtable was originally a project coordinated by the Institute For Education Affairs. In 1979, the IEA founded the Collegiate Network to help support conservative and libertarian college newspapers. Among others, IEA supported Counterpoint Magazine, founded at the University of Chicago by John Podhoretz and Tod Lindberg in 1979; and The Princeton Tory, founded by Yoram Hazony in 1984.

William Bennett, Allan Bloom, and Harvey Mansfield founded the Madison Center in 1988. In 1987, Irving Kristol helped Peter Thiel found The Stanford Review with the help of the MCEA.
