= Peter Frumkin =

Peter Frumkin is a professor focused in the areas of philanthropy, nonprofit management, and social entrepreneurship. He is currently Academic Director of the Gradel Institute of Charity at New College, Oxford.

== Professional life ==
Frumkin currently is the Mindy and Andrew Heyer Chair in Social Policy at the University of Pennsylvania. There he directs the Masters in Nonprofit Leadership Program and serves as faculty director of the Center for Social Impact Strategy.

Frumkin was a senior fellow at the New America Foundation and associate professor at Harvard University’s School of Government. He then became Professor of Public Affairs and served as the Director of the RGK Center for Philanthropy and Community Service located in the LBJ School of Public Affairs at the University of Texas at Austin.

He has served as a strategy and evaluation consultant to donors and foundations, and also has experience as a foundation program officer, public and nonprofit agency program evaluator, and a nonprofit manager.

In 2023, Frumkin was announced as the inaugural Academic Director of the Gradel Institute of Charity at New College, Oxford, which leads research into the governance and strategy of charitable organisations globally. He is currently the Academic Director of the Gradel Institute of Charity at New College, Oxford.

== Publications ==
Frumkin has authored several books and articles on all aspects of philanthropy and topics related to nonprofit management, grant-making strategy, social entrepreneurship, national service programs, and service contracting.

Key Publications:

- Building for the Arts: The Strategic Design of Cultural Facilities, University of Chicago Press, 2014, Co-author with Ana Kolendo
- Serving Country and Community, Harvard University Press, 2010, Co-author with JoAnn Jastrzab
- The Essence of Strategic Giving, University of Chicago Press, 2010
- Strategic Giving: The Art and Science of Philanthropy, University of Chicago, 2006
- On Being Nonprofit: A Conceptual and Policy Primer, Harvard University Press, 2002

== Awards ==
- 2007 John Grenzebach Award for Outstanding Research in Philanthropy for Educational Advancement, Outstanding Published Scholarship for Strategic Giving
- 2007 ARNOVA Outstanding Book in Nonprofit & Voluntary Action Research Honorable Mention for Strategic Giving
- 2005 Best Book Award, Sponsored by the Academy of Management, Public and Nonprofit Division for On Being Nonprofit
- 2004 Marshall E. Dimock Award from the American Society of Public Administration for Best Article in Public Administrative Review for "Reengineering Nonprofit Financial Accountability" with Elizabeth Keating

== Education ==
- Ph.D. in Sociology, University of Chicago
- M.P.P., Georgetown University
- B.A., Oberlin College
