= Franklin W. Olin =

American baseball player and civil engineer (1860–1951)

- Olin in 1915
- Born: January 9, 1860; Woodford, Vermont, U.S.
- Died: May 21, 1951 (aged 91); St. Louis, Missouri, U.S.
- Education: Cornell University
- Occupations: Industrialist, philanthropist, professional baseball player
- Known for: Founder of Olin Corporation
- Board member of: Olin Corporation
- Spouse: Mary Mott Moulton
- Children: 1) Franklin Walter Jr. 2) John Merrill (1892–1982); 3) Spencer Truman (1900–1995)
- Baseball career
- Outfielder
- Batted: Left Threw: Unknown

MLB debut
- July 4, 1884, for the Washington Nationals (AA)

Last MLB appearance
- June 10, 1885, for the Detroit Wolverines

MLB statistics
- At bats: 177
- RBI: 0
- Home runs: 1
- Batting average: .316
- Stats at Baseball Reference

Teams
- Washington Nationals (AA) (1884); Washington Nationals (UA) (1884); Toledo Blue Stockings (1884); Detroit Wolverines (1885)

Franklin Walter Olin (January 9, 1860 – May 21, 1951) was an American industrialist, philanthropist, and professional baseball player. He was the founder of Olin Corporation and Franklin W. Olin Foundation. Olin was born in Woodford, Vermont, and his father built mills and waterwheels.

== College and professional athletics ==
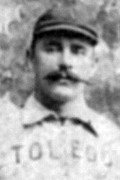
Frank Olin in 1884, wearing the Toledo Blue Stockings uniform.

Olin studied civil engineering at Cornell University, entering in 1881, where he also played baseball. While at Cornell, Olin was a well-regarded student athlete; he played both outfield and second base for the varsity baseball team, served as captain of the rifle team, rowed with the crew, and set school records in shot put and hammer throw. The Cornell baseball team won the State Intercollegiate League pennant twice while Olin played there, and they occasionally played against professional teams. Olin also assisted in the management of Cornell's athletics; he served as president of the Athletic Association and as a member of the Cornell Athletic Council, designed and managed the school's first batting cage, and invented a custom curved baseball bat which he claimed aided in hitting curve balls.

Before graduating, Olin briefly played professional baseball. As a professional baseball player, Olin played at least 49 games over two seasons, mostly in 1884. That year, he played for three teams, the Washington Nationals team for the American Association (21+ games) and their team for the Union Association (one or two games), and later the Toledo Blue Stockings (26+ games). In 1885, Olin played at least one game for the Detroit Wolverines, in which he played somewhat poorly, effectively ending his career. Olin batted left-handed, and mostly played outfield positions. In this relatively short professional career, Olin played quite well, earning a batting average of .316 over 177 at bats, and a fielding percentage of .800.

== Career and later life ==
After graduating from Cornell with the class of 1886, Olin worked in several jobs before founding a blasting powder mill construction business, the F. W. Olin Company, which would eventually become the Olin Corporation. The company's first mill opened in East Alton, Illinois, in 1892.

He married Mary Mott Moulton of Toledo, Ohio, on May 28, 1889. Olin and Mary moved to Alton, Illinois around 1890, where Olin would live until his death. They had three sons, Franklin W. Jr. (predeceased), John, and Spencer, all three of whom also graduated from Cornell.

He formed the Western Cartridge Company in 1898 to manufacture ammunition; during World War I he diversified into brassmaking for use in cartridge shells. In 1931 Olin acquired the Winchester Repeating Arms Company. His management of the several inter-related businesses has been described as "autocratic," characterized by close personal management of the enterprise and a fairly secretive attitude toward sales information and trade secrets, due especially to the businesses' rivalry with DuPont. In 1944 (after World War II), the businesses consolidated into a single "Olin Industries," and Olin retired from management of the firm, leaving it to his sons John and Spencer.

Olin died in St. Louis, Missouri, in 1951. A portion of his fortune was willed to the Franklin W. Olin Foundation, which endowed numerous buildings and professorships in his name at college campuses across the United States. In 1997, the foundation established Franklin W. Olin College of Engineering in Needham, Massachusetts.

== See also ==
- Olin Corporation
- F. W. Olin Foundation
- Olin College
- John M. Olin
