= John M. Olin =

American businessman (1892–1982)

- Born: John Merrill Olin; November 10, 1892; Alton, Illinois, U.S.
- Died: September 8, 1982 (aged 89); East Hampton, Long Island, New York, U.S.
- Education: Cornell University (BS)
- Occupations: Businessman, Philanthropist, Conservationist, Inventor, Racehorse owner/breeder
- Known for: John M. Olin Foundation
- Board member of: Olin Corporation
- Spouse(s): Adele Levis (divorced) Evelyn Brown (m. 1940)
- Children: Daughters with Adele: Adele Louise, Georgene
- Parent(s): Franklin W. Olin, Mary Mott Moulton
- Relatives: Spencer T. Olin

John Merrill Olin (November 10, 1892 – September 8, 1982) was an American businessman and philanthropist. He was the son of Franklin W. Olin.

== Early life and education ==
Born in Alton, Illinois, Olin graduated from Cornell University with a B.S. degree in chemistry and as a brother of Kappa Sigma fraternity and was a founding member of the Alpha Chi Sigma fraternity Tau chapter. With major financial contributions to the Olin Business School and the Olin Library at Washington University in St. Louis, both buildings were named after him. In addition, the Olin Library at Cornell University bears his name, as does a classroom building, Olin Hall, at Johns Hopkins University, and Olin-Sang Hall at Brandeis University.

He married twice. By his first wife, the former Adele Levis, a granddaughter of the founder of Illinois Glass Company, he had two daughters, Adele Louise and Georgene. With his second wife, Evelyn Brown, he had one stepdaughter, Evelyn.

== Business ==
Olin started his career in 1913 as a chemical engineer for his father's Western Cartridge Company, a predecessor of Olin Industries, Inc. In 1935, following Western Cartridge's acquisition of the Winchester Repeating Arms Company, he was named first vice-president of the merged Winchester-Western and head of the Winchester division. He became president of Olin Industries in 1944 and upon merger of the company with Mathieson Chemical Corporation in 1954 became chairman of the board of the new corporation, named Olin Mathieson Chemical Corporation. Subsequently, the name was shortened to Olin Corporation. Olin retired as chairman of the board in 1957 to become chairman of the executive committee, a position he held until he was elected honorary chairman of the board in 1963.

Olin was an inventor or co-inventor of 24 United States patents in the field of arms and ammunition manufacture and design and was responsible for numerous developments in ballistics.

John Merrill Olin died in 1982 at age 89 at his home in East Hampton, New York.

== Conservative activism ==
Olin, through his Olin Foundation, created Centers focusing on the intersection of Law and Economics within law schools including Harvard, Yale, UVA, and Stanford. He helped fund the Heritage Foundation, Hoover Institute, American Enterprise Institute, and the Federalist Society.

== Thoroughbred horse racing ==
John and Evelyn Olin bred and raced a number of thoroughbred racehorses, notably winning the 1963 Epsom Oaks with the filly Noblesse, and the 1974 Kentucky Derby with the colt Cannonade.

His granddaughter Adele B. Dilschneider is also a Thoroughbred owner and breeder, whose memberships have included the Kentucky Derby Museum, the Thoroughbred Owners and Breeders Association, the American Horse Council, the Thoroughbred Club of America, and the National Museum of Racing and Hall of Fame.

== Bibliography ==
- Miller, John J. (2005). A Gift of Freedom: How the John M. Olin Foundation Changed America. New York: Encounter Books. ISBN 978-1594031175.
