= Olin Corporation =

American chemical manufacturing company

- Type: Public
- Traded as: NYSE: OLN; S&P 600 component
- Industry: Chemicals; Manufacturing
- Founded: 1892; 134 years ago
- Founder: Franklin W. Olin
- Headquarters: Clayton, Missouri, U.S.
- Area served: Worldwide
- Key people: William Weideman (chairman); Kenneth Lane (president and CEO)
- Products: Copper alloys Ammunition; Chlorine; Sodium hydroxide Epoxies; Vinyls; Hydrochloric acid
- Revenue: ▼US$6.54 billion (2024)
- Operating income: ▼US$297 million (2024)
- Net income: ▼US$109 million (2024)
- Total assets: ▼US$7.58 billion (2024)
- Total equity: ▼US$2.02 billion (2024)
- Number of employees: 6,300 in more than 20 countries (2026)
- Website: www.olin.com

Olin Corporation is an American manufacturer of ammunition, chlorine, and sodium hydroxide. The company traces its roots to two companies, both founded in 1892: Franklin W. Olin's Equitable Powder Company and the Mathieson Alkali Works.

== History ==
=== Founding and expansion (1890s–1900s) ===
The company was started by Franklin Walter Olin in Niagara Falls, New York as the Equitable Powder Company. Olin created the company for the purpose of supplying the area's coal mines and limestone quarries with explosives. Olin's blasting and gunpowder company expanded into the production of cartridges in 1898. The company bought a paper manufacturer (the Ecusta Paper Company in Pisgah Forest, North Carolina), a lead shot facility, an explosive primer facility, a cartridge brass manufacturing facility, and a fiber wad facility. The company also started its own brass mill. Franklin Olin, along with his two sons John and Spencer, merged these companies together to form the Western Cartridge Company in direct competition with Remington and Winchester. For a time, his competitors were able to get their suppliers to shut off sources of raw materials in an attempt to drive Olin out of business and, in order to survive, Olin was forced to diversify the activities of the company. With the advent of World War I, the Olins made a fortune supplying ammunition through Western Cartridge. In 1931, Western bought Winchester and in 1935 merged the two, forming Winchester-Western.

In 1944, the various Olin companies were organized under a new corporate parent, Olin Industries, Inc. At the time, Olin Industries and its subsidiary companies ran the St. Louis Arsenal and contributed to the war effort with manufacturing roles at the Badger Army Ammunition and Lake City Army Ammunition Plants. Olin's plants in New Haven, Connecticut and East Alton, Illinois employed about 17,000 workers each producing the guns and small-caliber ammunition needed during World War II. The war production helped the Olins to become one of the wealthiest American families of the time.

In 1952, Olin opened a chlorine plant in McIntosh, Alabama. The production process at this facility originally involved mercury, which contaminated the groundwater.

=== Mathieson Chemical acquisition ===
After the war, the Olins acquired the Mathieson Chemical Corporation—also founded in 1892. Long before its association with Olin, Mathieson Alkali Works began business in Saltville, Virginia, and a year later acquired its neighbor, the Holston Salt and Plaster Corp. Saltville became a quintessential company town, where they produced chlorine and caustic soda, and in the process leached methylmercury (by the company's own estimates, up to 100 pounds per day) into the soils and the North fork of the Holston River. The site was declared a Superfund site in 1982.

In 1952, Mathieson Chemical Company, as it was known by then, acquired controlling interest in the pharmaceutical firm of E. R. Squibb and Sons (now part of Bristol-Myers Squibb). Afterward, the corporation diversified its interests into a wide variety of businesses, including plastics, cellophane, bauxite mining, automotive specialties, powder actuated nailing tools, and home construction. The Olin Ski Company manufactured camping and skiing gear. By 1988, however, Olin skis were produced under license by K2 Sports.

Olin Industries and Mathieson Chemical merged in 1954 to form the Olin Mathieson Chemical Corporation. The new company had 35,000 employees, 46 domestic and 17 foreign plants. The company manufactured phenoxy herbicides and anti-crop agents for Fort Detrick under contract to the U.S. Army Chemical Corps. The company also manufactured electric batteries, marketing them for use in flashlights. John Olin retired in 1963. The following year, the company brought in hardware-experienced executives to run Winchester. The new management team introduced cheap, stamped metal parts into the Winchester line, which eventually damaged the quality reputation Winchester had previously enjoyed.

Olin on January 24, 1956 announced their plan to enter the aluminum industry and built a $120 million 60,000tpa smelter and fabrication plant near Clarington, Ohio. On August 29, 1956 the formation of a joint venture with Revere Copper and Brass was announced: the Olin Revere Metals Corporation (Ormet) built a $110 million 180,000tpa smelter (39.7038°N 80.8463°W), from which Olin was entitled to receive 120,000tpa, and an alumina refinery at Burnside, Louisiana to supply the smelter. Olin was one of the founders and held a 48.5% stake in the Fria (Guinea) alumina plant from 1957 to 1974. Olin sold its aluminum business in 1973 to Consolidated Aluminum Corporation.

==== 1924 "Muck Dam Collapse" ====
Nearly 30 years prior to Olin acquiring Mathieson Chemical, a dam collapsed.

=== Corporate reduction (1969–2010) ===
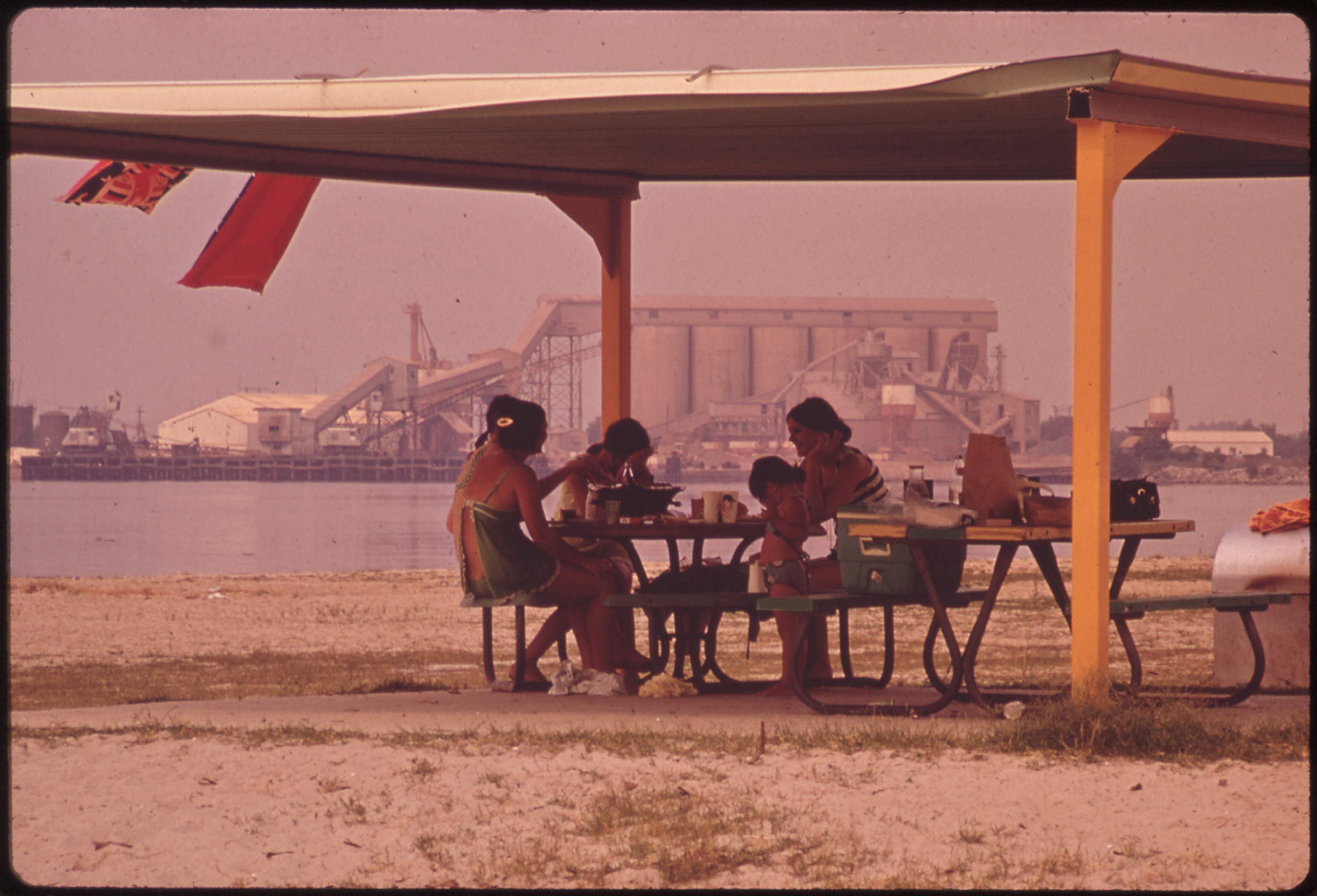
A family has lunch in Lake Charles, Louisiana, on the beach opposite the Olin Mathieson chemical plant, 1972

The company became Olin Corporation in 1969 and subsequently began selling off many of its acquired businesses. Since then, Olin Corporation has been shrinking (except for a brief expansion in the early 1980s).

Olin was the first U.S. corporation to be prosecuted for violations of the arms embargo, and in 1978 was convicted for selling Winchester rifles to private dealers in South Africa. When charged, the Winchester Division affirmed in a legal brief that:

... the Winchester employees principally responsible for dealing with the State Department on export license matters over the years developed the belief that the Department was "winking" at the representation [by the company] that arms sent to South Africa were said to be destined for other countries.

— brief filed in U.S. District Court, New Haven, Conn. (20 March 1978)., "Memorandum on Behalf of Olin Corporation"

After ongoing declines in its business at Winchester, on December 12, 1980, Olin made the decision to sell Winchester firearms to the firm's employees under the name US Repeating Arms Company. Olin, however, kept the Winchester brand name and licensed it to US Repeating Arms Company. Olin sold its European Winchester ammunition business, and also licensed the Winchester brand name, to GIAT (of Versailles, France). Olin transferred its ball propellant manufacturing plant to General Dynamics subsidiary St. Marks Powder in 1998. Olin spun off its specialty chemicals business on February 8, 1999, as Arch Chemicals, Inc. Olin afterwards focused more on its ammunition, brass and chlor-alkali businesses.

The ammunition business was strengthened by the Iraq and Afghanistan wars. After 2004, the Olin Corporation moved some manufacturing of its Winchester products from East Alton to Oxford, Mississippi, which started with the rimfire cartridge (.22LR) production, then its load and pack operations. After Olin moved production of its Winchester rimfire ammunition production to Mississippi in 2004, in 2006, Olin announced that it had entered into a new license agreement with Browning Arms Company to market Winchester brand rifles and shotguns. The new Winchester company was named U.S. Repeating Arms as a licensee of Olin Corporation, which still owned Winchester ammunition. In May 2007, Olin agreed to buy Pioneer Co. Inc., a chlor-alkali products maker, for $414 million. Olin announced the sale of its brass division in October 2007 to Global Brass and Copper, an affiliate of KPS Capital Partners, for $400 million. The sale included all of Olin's worldwide metals operations, including the A.J. Oster metals service centers. It sold a plant in East Alton in 2007, and moved production of centerfire ammunition to Oxford, Mississippi in 2010 from East Alton.

The McIntosh chlorine plant began using asbestos, a potent carcinogen, in 1978. The chemical was not safely contained, and employees regularly breathed it in and were not given protective equipment. The company was aware of the hazard and told workers that they could stay safe by preventing the material from becoming airborne. OSHA gave the company advance notice of its inspections, for which they regularly cleaned up the asbestos. The 2007 merger between Pioneer and Olin created the third-largest chlorine producer in the United States. In 2010, an equipment failure at the McIntosh plant released caustic soda into the atmosphere, and the plant frequently releases chlorine into the atmosphere. Residents have complained that they were not adequately informed of the leaks.

=== Spinoffs and joint ventures (2015–2022) ===
On March 27, 2015, Dow Chemical Company announced that it would spin off its chlorine and epoxy businesses and merge them with Olin Corporation. Dow earned around $5 billion in the deal including $2 billion in cash, with the new Olin to have revenue of around $7 billion, with Olin chairman and CEO Joseph D. Rupp to lead the new larger company. Separately, Dow also agreed to supply Olin with ethylene. On October 5, 2015, Olin successfully acquired Dow's U.S. Gulf Coast Chlor-Alkali and Vinyl, Global Chlorinated Organics, and Global Epoxy business units, in addition to 100 percent interest in the Dow Mitsui Chlor-Alkali joint venture. As of 2016, Olin president and CEO was John E. Fischer.

In 2016, an Olin Corp. facility on Dow Chemical property in Plaquemine near Baton Rouge had a chlorine leak which led to the evacuation of the Dow plant. In 2016, Olin Corp, which was still based in Missouri, announced it was laying off 100 workers, or around 80% of the facility's workforce, at a factory north of downtown Henderson, also halting chlorine production at the site. It also stopped production of lye, with the facility to be remade into a bleach factory and distribution center for various industrial chemicals. Olin also scaled back chlorine production at other factories in New York and Texas. In 2019, Olin announced it was closing two plants in Texas by the end of 2020. It was reported in 2020 that Sachem Head Capital Management had built a stake in Olin Corporation at 9.4%. At that time, Olin remained headquartered in Clayton, Missouri and had 12 directors on its board. In 2020, Scott M. Sutton was selected by the Olin board to succeed Fischer as CEO and president, with Fischer becoming executive chairman.

As of 2021, the Olin Chemical Superfund Site was still undergoing cleanup under Olin Corporation, with the EPA having managed the site 2006, and the 53-acre facility purchased by Olin in 1980. The EPA was overseeing the cleanup of a Olin Corp. facility in East Alton by 2021, taking public comments on Olin's proposed cleanup plan to contaminated soil and groundwater in July 2021. In 2021, Olin shut down half of its diaphragm-grade chlor alkali production at its facility in McIntosh, Alabama.

In 2022, Olin created a joint venture with Plug Power Inc., to produce 15 tons of "green" hydrogen per day at a plant in Louisiana, to be operational by 2023 according to the company. In 2022, it had seven production facilities in the United States and Canada dedicated to chlorine and caustic soda. The former Olin Corporation headquarters in East Alton, after being purchased by the Wieland Group, were razed in 2022. The structure had previously employed 1,800 people when Olin had used it as an ammunition production facility.

== Products and divisions ==
As a producer of ammunition and industrial chemicals, in 2022, the Olin Corporation had three overall business segments: "Chlor-Alkali Products and Vinyls, Epoxy (epoxy materials and precursors), and Winchester (arms and ammunition)." The company produces chemicals such as chlorine, caustic soda, and hydrogen through a process involving the electrolysis of salt. The chemical branches of the business also produce vinyls, epoxies, chlorinated organics, bleach, and hydrochloric acid.

== See also ==
- F. W. Olin Foundation
- John M. Olin Foundation
