= Spencer Truman Olin =

American industrialist and philanthropist (1900–1995)

- Born: August 20, 1900; Alton, Illinois, U.S.
- Died: April 14, 1995 (aged 94); Jupiter Island, Florida, U.S.
- Education: Cornell University (1921)
- Known for: Spencer T. & Ann W. Olin Foundation
- Political party: Republican Party
- Board member of: Olin Corporation, Illinois Bell, Laclede Steel, Washington University in St. Louis
- Spouse: Ann Whitney Olin
- Children: Spencer T. Jr., Mary Dell, Barbara Ann, Eunice Whitney
- Parent(s): Franklin W. Olin and Mary Mott Moulton
- Relatives: Siblings: Franklin Walter Jr., John Merrill

Spencer Truman Olin (August 20, 1900 – April 14, 1995) was an American businessman and philanthropist. He was an executive of the Olin Corporation, founded in 1892 by his father, Franklin W. Olin, eventually serving as first vice president of Olin Industries, though he reduced his involvement with the company after its 1954 merger with Mathieson.

He was raised in Alton, Illinois. In 1921 he graduated from Cornell University, where he had studied mechanical engineering, and where he had joined Kappa Sigma fraternity like his father.

Olin was very active in the Republican Party throughout much of his adult life. He was an important fundraiser for Dwight D. Eisenhower and served as the party's national finance chairman from 1958 to 1960 and treasurer of the Republican National Committee from 1960 to 1962.

Outside of his professional and political life, he won a pro-am golf tournament with Arnold Palmer at The Greenbrier in 1954, beginning a 40-year friendship. The win helped launch Palmer's career. Later, when Olin donated $5 million to build a public golf course in Alton, Palmer agreed to design it.

He was a significant donor to the Washington University School of Medicine, whose first residence hall is named after him, its construction anchored by a $500,000 gift, and also home to the Ann Whitney Olin Women's Building, named after his wife. At least seven professorships, fellowships, and scholarships and the university were funded through the Spencer T. & Ann W. Olin Foundation, which was established in 1958. The foundation also funded a variety of environmental groups, health and medical education and services, education, and arts groups in the St. Louis area and around the United States until it ceased operations in 2004. Olin also gave generously to Cornell, his alma mater, where the research chemistry lab is named after him, as well as the annual Olin Lecture. Washington University School of Medicine was also a leading beneficiary. Both universities received $30 million in $1.5M annual installments starting in 1986.

Spencer Olin died at his home in Jupiter Island, Florida, in 1995 at age 94.
