= Olin Observatory =

Observatory in Connecticut, US

- Organization: Connecticut College
- Location: New London, Connecticut
- Coordinates: 41°22′44″N 72°6′19″W
- Altitude: 60 feet (18 m)
- Website: Connecticut College Observatories

Telescopes
- unnamed telescope: 0.5 m reflector

Olin Observatory is an astronomical observatory in New London, Connecticut (USA), owned and operated by Connecticut College. It is part of the F.W. Olin Science Center. The observatory hosts public stargazing events, and is also used for undergraduate instruction.

== Telescopes ==
- A 0.5 m (20 in) Ritchey–Chrétien reflecting telescope was built by Optomechanics and sits on a half-fork equatorial mount.
- An 1881 Alvan Clark refracting telescope is located at the old observatory on top of Frederic Bill Hall.

== See also ==
- List of Astronomical Observatories
