= Philanthropy Roundtable =

Non-profit organization advising U.S. conservative philanthropists

The Philanthropy Roundtable
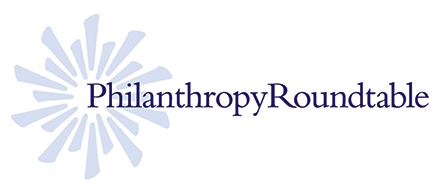
- Founded: 1987, gained independent status in 1991
- Founder: William E. Simon, Irving Kristol
- Type: 501(c)(3)
- Tax ID no.: 13-2943020
- Purpose: Philanthropic strategy and analysis, philanthropic freedom, preserving donor intent
- Location(s): 1120 20th Street NW, Suite 550 South; Washington, D.C. 20036, United States
- Coordinates: 38.9053°N 77.0401°W
- Origins: Formerly project of Institute For Educational Affairs
- Method: Publications, events, consulting
- Members: 600+
- President and CEO: Christie Herrera
- Revenue: $12.5 million (2024)
- Website: www.philanthropyroundtable.org

The Philanthropy Roundtable is a nonprofit organization that advises conservative philanthropists and advocates for donor privacy.

== History ==
The Roundtable was founded in 1987 as a project of the now-defunct Institute For Educational Affairs. It was founded as a conservative alternative to the Council on Foundations, a nonprofit membership association of donors. Membership in the organization was free "to interested grant makers", and 140 foundations, charities and nonprofits joined in the Roundtable's first year.

In 1991, Philanthropy Roundtable became an independent entity with its own board of directors and staff, headquartered in Indianapolis, Indiana. The Philanthropy Roundtable is a 501(c)(3) organization. It has been described as conservative and non-partisan.

DonorsTrust, founded in 1999, and Donors Capital Fund have been described as spinoffs of the Philanthropy Roundtable.

In 2005, Philanthropy Roundtable created the Alliance For Charitable Reform (ACR), which opposes legislation that would create accreditation requirements for grant-making foundations, establish a five-year Internal Revenue Service review of tax-exempt status, or restrict the ability of donors to establish family foundations.

The organization has a bimonthly newsletter, Philanthropy, which evolved into a quarterly magazine in 2011. In 2016, the Roundtable published the Almanac of American Philanthropy, a reference book that summarizes the history, purposes, effects, and modern direction of private giving.

In June 2025, the Philanthropy Roundtable was among a coalition of organizations representing nonprofits who wrote a letter to congressional leaders opposing the proposed significant tax hike on private foundations in the One Big Beautiful Bill Act. The letter warned of "the catastrophic impact on local communities posed by this proposal to divert philanthropic resources into the federal bureaucracy."

=== William E. Simon Prize ===
In 2007, the William E. Simon Foundation named the Roundtable the administrator of the William E. Simon Prize for Philanthropic Leadership. Recipients of the prize since the Roundtable's administration of it include Bernie Marcus, Eli Broad, Charles Koch, Roger Hertog, Philip Anschutz and his wife Nancy, S. Truett Cathy, and Frank Hanna III.

== Leadership ==
Kimberly Dennis was the organization's first executive director. She served as executive director from 1991 through 1996. John P. Walters assumed administrative leadership of the organization in the new role of president in 1997 when the organization moved its headquarters to Washington, D.C. Walters remained in that position until resigning in October 2001 to accept an appointment by George W. Bush as director of the Office of National Drug Control Policy. Adam Meyerson served as the organization's president from 2001 to 2020. In June 2020, he was replaced by Elise Westhoff, who was named president and chief executive officer. In October 2023, Christie Herrera was promoted to president and CEO.
