= Javier G. Fernandez =

Physicist and bioengineer

- Born: 1981 (age 44–45); Cantabria

Academic background
- Education: University of Cantabria; Lund University
- Alma mater: University of Barcelona

Javier G. Fernandez (born 1981 in Cantabria) is a Spanish physicist and bioengineer. He is a ICREA professor at the Institute for Bioengineering of Catalonia. He is known for his work in biomimetic materials and sustainable biomanufacturing, particularly for pioneering chitin's use for general and sustainable manufacturing.

Fernandez is a scientific founder of Chitonous Pte. Ltd., a biomanufacturing company centered on environmental security.

== Education ==
Fernandez received his M.Sc. in Physics from the University of Cantabria and in Nanotechnology from Lund University. Fernandez completed his Ph.D. on biomedical applications of chitin in 2008, which was awarded the best Ph.D. thesis at the University of Barcelona that year.

== Career and significant contributions ==
After his Ph.D., Fernandez joined the Massachusetts Institute of Technology (MIT), where he worked with Ali Khademhosseini on the development of "Micro-masonry" (also known as "biolegos" or "biological legos"), an early example of additive manufacturing of artificial organs and that was considered a breakthrough in the field. In 2010 Fernandez moved to Harvard University as researcher in the early stages of the Wyss Institute for Biologically Inspired Engineering, where he worked with its founding director, Donald E. Ingber. At the Wyss Institute, Fernandez developed the use of bioinspired engineering to integrate structural biomolecules in high-performance and sustainable applications. This work included the development of Shrilk, a biomimetic and fully biological material replicating the insects' exoskeleton's mechanical properties by using its native organization and components (i.e., chitin and fibroin). He later demonstrated the extension Shrilk's manufacturing approach to enable the general use of chitosan in product manufacturing, a material often referred to as "shrimp plastic" due to the common sourcing of chitosan from discarded shrimp shells. Shrilk and the concept of bioinspired materials using unmodified biomolecules are regarded as having the potential to produce a global paradigm change towards sustainable manufacturing.

In 2015 he was hired again by MIT as an associate professor and member of the Singapore University of Technology and Design(SUTD). At SUTD Fernandez developed the Fungus-Like Adhesive Materials (FLAM), the first example of large-scale 3D printing using unmodified chitin and cellulose. With a focus on low cost and manufacturability, FLAM enabled the industrial production of 3D-printed large biological objects, bringing the field of bioinspired manufacturing to an industrially relevant level. He also demonstrated the integration of FLAM and bioinspired manufacturing with ecological cycles and urban waste management. Fernandez's approach to manufacturing based on unmodified biomolecules and their integration within ecological cycles, in addition to being a critical factor for sustainable development, has been demonstrated to be an essential aspect of long-term extraplanetary colonization. In September 2025, he moved to Barcelona and became an ICREA Research Professor at the IBEC.

== Honors and awards ==
- 2014: Bayer Early Excellence in Science Award
- 2015: Awarded Innovator Under 35 by MIT Technology Review
- 2016: Awarded top innovator in close-loop technologies by the LAUNCH organization
- 2018: FormNext Purmundus innovation award in additive manufacturing
- 2018: SG Mark for the invention of Shrilk and bioinspired materials
- 2019: A' Design award
- 2019: SG Mark for the developing large-scale printing of biomimetic materials
- 2019: Good Design Award for the development of large-scale additive manufacturing with biological composites
