= María García-Parajo =

Spanish biophysicist

María F. García-Parajo
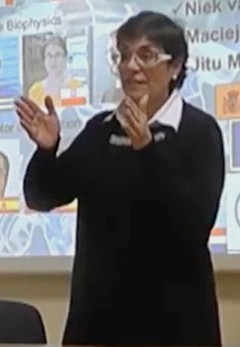
- García-Parajo in 2015
- Born: 1962 (age 63–64)
- Education: Imperial College London
- Scientific career
- Workplaces: Institute for Bioengineering of Catalonia; Catalan Institution for Research and Advanced Studies; University of Twente; ICFO

María F. García-Parajo (born 1962) is a Spanish bioengineer who is a professor at The Institute of Photonic Sciences in Barcelona. Her research combines photonics, single molecule sensing and bioengineering to understand and control cellular function. She has developed optical techniques to study the dynamic biological processes that occur in living cells

== Early life and education ==
García-Parajo studied physical electronics at Imperial College London. She completed two postdoctoral positions, one at the Laboratory of Microstructures and Microelectronics (L2M-CNRS) in Bagneux and one at the University of Twente. In 1998, she joined the faculty at the University of Twente. She moved to Spain in 2005.

== Research and career ==
García-Parajo was appointed as a research professor at the Catalan Institution for Research and Advanced Studies in 2005. She was originally based at the Institute for Bioengineering of Catalonia, and eventually at ICFO. García-Parajo develops advanced optical approaches to study biological processes, and leads the Single Molecule Biophotonics group. She has developed super-resolution microscopy, fluorescence correlation spectroscopy and photonic antennas that are capable of reaching 10 nm resolution inside living cells (in vivo and in vitro). Multi-colour single particle tracking allows García-Parajo to investigate dynamic cellular function. She looks to understand how spatial and temporal compartmentalisation of biomolecules in cells impacts cellular function. Her research has implications for health and disease.

Garcia-Parajo has shown how HIV is capable of hijacking dendritic cells, travelling with them to the lymph node and then being transmitted to the T-cells to cause AIDS. Activation of the dendritic cells leads to SIGLEC1 nanoclusters, which capture particles like HIV. This triggers a transformation of the actin cytoskeletons of dendritic cells, forcing them to form sack-like spaces that collect viruses which are implicated in the spreading of infection.

Alongside her research, García-Parajo is an advocate for diversity in science.

== Awards and honours ==
- 2017 Bruker National Prize in Biophysics
- 2017 ERC Advanced Grant
- 2020 European Physical Society Emmy Noether Laureate

== Selected publications ==
- Maria Aurelia Ricci; Manzo, Carlo; María García Parajo; Melike Lakadamyali; Cosma, Maria Pia (2015). "Chromatin fibers are formed by heterogeneous groups of nucleosomes in vivo". Cell. 160 (6): 1145–1158. doi:10.1016/j.cell.2015.01.054. PMID 25768910. Wikidata Q53584742.
- Manzo, Carlo; Maria F Garcia-Parajo (2015). "A review of progress in single particle tracking: from methods to biophysical insights". Reports on Progress in Physics. 78 (12) 124601. doi:10.1088/0034-4885/78/12/124601. PMID 26511974. Wikidata Q38618914.
- Deep Punj; Mathieu Mivelle; Satish Babu Moparthi; van Zanten, Thomas; Hervé Rigneault; Niek F van Hulst; María García Parajo; Jérôme Wenger (2013). "A plasmonic 'antenna-in-box' platform for enhanced single-molecule analysis at micromolar concentrations". Nature Nanotechnology. 8 (7): 512–516. doi:10.1038/nnano.2013.98. PMID 23748196. Wikidata Q46427032.
