= David J. Mooney =

Professor of Bioengineering at the Harvard School of Engineering and Applied Sciences

David James Mooney
- Born: Madison, Wisconsin
- Education: University of Wisconsin, Madison, Massachusetts Institute of Technology
- Scientific career
- Fields: Tissue engineering
- Workplaces: Harvard University
- Doctoral advisor: Robert Langer
- Other academic advisors: Joseph Vacanti

David James Mooney (born November 1, 1964) is the Robert P. Pinkas Family Professor of Bioengineering at the Harvard School of Engineering and Applied Sciences. He is also a founding core faculty member at the Wyss Institute for Biologically Inspired Engineering at Harvard University.

== Research ==
Born in Madison, Wisconsin, he earned his B.S. in Chemical Engineering from the University of Wisconsin, Madison and his Ph.D. in Chemical Engineering from the Massachusetts Institute of Technology with advisor Robert Langer. He did his post-doctoral studies at Harvard University under the supervision of Joseph Vacanti and Donald Ingber. David Mooney started his career as an assistant professor at The University of Michigan and stayed there until 2004 when he moved to Harvard University. Mooney is a member of the National Academy of Engineering and the National Academy of Medicine. Mooney is best known for his work in using biomaterials for regenerative and tissue engineering particularly alginate hydrogels. The Mooney group is also focused on mechanotransduction and immunoengineering. Notable alumni of Mooney's laboratory include Lonnie Shea, Claudia Fischbach, Eben Alsberg, and Yevgeny Brudno.

He was elected into the National Academy of Engineering in 2010 for contributions to the fields of tissue engineering and regeneration. In addition, David Mooney is a Fellow of the National Academy of Inventors.
