= Yevgeny Brudno =

American biomedical engineer

- Education: University of Pennsylvania (B.A.); Harvard University (Ph.D., Chemistry and Chemical Biology)
- Known for: Implantable biomaterial scaffolds for in vivo CAR T cell production
- Scientific career
- Fields: Biomedical engineering, Biomaterials, Chemistry, Cellular immunotherapy
- Institutions: University of North Carolina at Chapel Hill; North Carolina State University
- Doctoral advisor: David R. Liu
- Other academic advisors: David J. Mooney (postdoctoral)

Yevgeny Brudno is an American chemist and Associate Professor in the Joint Department of Biomedical Engineering at the University of North Carolina at Chapel Hill and North Carolina State University, with a joint appointment in the Division of Pharmacoengineering and Molecular Pharmaceutics at the UNC Eshelman School of Pharmacy. He is known for developing implantable biomaterial scaffolds that manufacture chimeric antigen receptor (CAR) T cells directly inside the body, aiming to reduce the cost and manufacturing time of CAR-T cell therapy.

== Education ==
Brudno earned dual Bachelor of Arts degrees in chemistry and biophysics from the University of Pennsylvania. He completed a Ph.D. in organic chemistry at Harvard University, where he worked in the laboratory of David R. Liu developing directed evolution technologies.

He subsequently completed postdoctoral training at the Wyss Institute for Biologically Inspired Engineering at Harvard University under David J. Mooney, developing controlled-release drug delivery technologies for cancer and regenerative medicine. During this period, Brudno co-authored research on bioorthogonal click chemistry for in vivo targeting of implanted drug-eluting devices.

== Career and research ==
Brudno joined the Division of Pharmacoengineering and Molecular Pharmaceutics at the UNC Eshelman School of Pharmacy with an appointment in the Joint Department of Biomedical Engineering at UNC-Chapel Hill and NC State University, with an additional appointment in the . His laboratory develops biomaterials for therapeutic cell production and drug delivery, with a particular focus on cancer immunotherapy and CAR-T cell manufacturing.

In 2022, Brudno's lab reported the development of an implantable macroporous alginate scaffold, termed MASTER (Multifunctional Alginate Scaffold for T cell Engineering and Release), capable of activating, transducing, and expanding CAR-T cells directly inside the body, reducing manufacturing time from several weeks to about one day.

His research on CAR-T scaffold technology has been supported by multiple grants from the National Cancer Institute, including an R37 award for "Biomaterial Scaffolds for Ex Vivo and In Situ CAR-T Cell Production" and an R01 award for "Bioinstructive Scaffolds for Potent and Affordable CAR-T Cell Therapy Against Brain Tumors."

== Awards and Honors ==
- Fellow of the American Institute for Medical and Biological Engineering (AIMBE) in 2026, recognizing his contributions to biomedical engineering.
- Goodnight Early Career Innovator Award from North Carolina State University.
- Alumni Outstanding Teacher Award and the NC State Outstanding Teacher Award.
- Received an NIH R37 MERIT Award, granted by the National Institutes of Health to investigators with a demonstrated record of exceptional research productivity.
