= Quintiliano =

Quintiliano may refer to:

- Quintilian, Roman educator and rhetorician born in Hispania, widely referred to in medieval schools of rhetoric and in Renaissance writing
- Quintiliano de Mesquita, Brazilian physician and scientist
