= Quintiliano de Mesquita =

Brazilian physician and scientist

Quintiliano H. de Mesquita (Quintiliano H. Guedes de Mesquita) (1918 – October 28, 2000), Brazilian physician and scientist, was born in João Pessoa, state of Paraíba. His parents were Odilon Martins de Mesquita, trader, and Nathália Guedes Pereira.

== Biography ==
He obtained his degree of M.D. in 1939 at the Faculdade de Medicina do Recife, state of Pernambuco. In 1940 he moved to São Paulo where he made his specialization in cardiology at the Hospital Municipal de São Paulo under the direction of Dr. Dante Pazzanese, staying there as voluntary assistant giving annual lectures on arrhythmias until 1949. In 1945 he founded and directed the Cardiology Institute of Matarazzo Hospital till 1979. In 1943 he was one of the founders of the Brazilian Society of Cardiology. Dr. Mesquita was also appointed as honorary professor at the Faculdade de Medicina da Universidade Federal da Paraíba.

Among Dr. Mesquita's several pioneer contributions to the medical science, the most important are:

1) A new electrocardiographic classification of incomplete branch block with the discovery of 2 new types of bundle branch block in 1948

2) First case of post-infarction ventricular aneurism operated by Charles Bailey in 1954. Charles P. Bailey in a letter of March 16, 1954 accepted the idea offered by Quintiliano H. de Mesquita to perform the aneurysmectomy in his patient

3) First case of right ventricular infarction diagnosed in vivo by new electrocardiographic patterns. contradicting the ECG Cavity Theory and confirming the ECG Vectorial Theory of Myocardial Infarction, in 1958. Myron Prinzmetal agreed with his diagnosis on July 22, 1959 by letter. On November 27, 1981 Ary L. Goldberger agreed that the vectorial theory is more flexible than the cavity potential explanation to Q waves.

4) The Myogenic Theory of Myocardial Infarction, in 1972 supporting the use of cardiac glycosides in prevention and in treatment of acute coronary syndromes. Awarded with the Ernst Edens Tradition Prize by the International Society for Infarct Combat, 1975.

5) The confirmation of the Prinzmetal's Theory of Accelerated Conduction, 1999
