= Samira Musah =

American biomedical engineer

- Education: SUNY Binghamton (BS); University of Wisconsin-Madison (PhD)
- Scientific career
- Fields: Biomedical engineering
- Workplaces: Duke University Pratt School of Engineering
- Thesis: (2012)
- Doctoral advisor: Laura L. Kiessling

Samira Musah is an American biomedical engineer and professor at the Duke University Pratt School of Engineering. She is known for her work in biomimetic systems, in particular for her work in developing an organ-on-a-chip model of the kidney glomerulus during her postdoctoral fellowship.

== Education ==
Musah received her BS in chemistry at SUNY Binghamton, where she worked under Omowunmi Sadik for her undergraduate thesis. Musah completed her PhD at the University of Wisconsin-Madison, where her work focused on material environments for induced pluripotent stem cells.

== Career ==
From 2014 to 2018, Musah was a Dean's Postdoctoral Fellow at Harvard Medical School's Wyss Institute for Biologically Inspired Engineering, where she completed her training between the labs of George Church and Donald E. Ingber. At the Wyss Institute, she led a project to develop a functioning in vitro model glomerulus with differentiation of stem cells into mature podocytes. She was honored for her interdisciplinary work in this project by a Physics World "Faces of Physics" short documentary.

Since 2019, Musah has been an assistant professor at Duke. As a member of the Duke MEDx program, Musah holds a joint appointment between the engineering and medical programs. Her laboratory focuses on understanding human kidney development and guided differentiation of induced pluripotent stem cells. At Duke, Musah has spoken of the value of a writing program for underrepresented faculty in which she participated.

Musah's interest include Induced pluripotent stem cells (iPS cells), disease mechanisms, regenerative medicine, molecular and cellular basis of human kidney development and disease. Organ engineering, patient-specific disease models, biomarkers, therapeutic discover, tissue and organ transplantation are also of interest. Other interests include microphysiological systems (including organs-on-chips and organoids), matrix biology, mechanotransduction, mechanobiology, and disease biophysics.

In the Musah Lab, they work to understand how molecular signals and biophysical forces function synergistically or independently guiding organ development and physiology. The Lab looks at how these processes can be therapeutically harnessed for treatment of human disease, particularly kidney disease. The Musah Lab works on engineering stem cell fate for applications in human kidney disease, extra-renal complications, and therapeutic development.

== Honors and awards ==
- 2017 Baxter Young Investigator Award
- 2020 Whitehead Scholarship in Biomedical Research
- 2020 Cell 100 inspiring Black scientists in America
- 2021 Nature Biotechnology Outstanding and Trailblazing Black Researchers

== Published works ==
"Musah, S, Uncovering SARS-CoV-2 kidney tropism.," Nature Reviews. Molecular Cell Biology, vol 22 no. 8 (2021) [10.1038/s41580-021-00370-w] [abs]"

"Introductions to the Community: Early-Career Researchers in the Time of COVID-19.," Cell Stem Cell, vol 27 no. 2 (2020), pp. 200-201 [10.1016/j.stem.2020.07.016] [abs]

Burt, M; Bhattachaya, R; Okafor, AE; Musah, S, "Guided Differentiation of Mature Kidney Podocytes from Human Induced Pluripotent Stem Cells Under Chemically Defined Conditions.," Journal of Visualized Experiments : Jove no. 161 (2020) [10.3791/61299] [abs]
