= IBEC =

IBEC may refer to:

- Ibec, an Irish business representation organisation.
- Institute for Bioengineering of Catalonia, a Barcelona institution engaged in basic and applied research in bioengineering and nanomedicine.
