= Love the Future =

Studio album by Chester French
- Released: April 21, 2009
- Recorded: 2005–2009
- Genres: Indie pop; futurepop; synth-pop; electronic
- Length: 42:55
- Labels: Star Trak; Interscope
- Producer: Chester French

Chester French chronology
| Jacques Jams, Vol. 1: Endurance (2008) | Love the Future (2009) | Songs 4 Tngrs (2012) |

Singles from Love the Future
- 1. "She Loves Everybody" Released: November 18, 2008

Love the Future is the debut album by the band Chester French, which was released on April 21, 2009 under the record label Star Trak Entertainment.

== Background ==
Love the Future was primarily recorded while the duo attended Harvard University; they recorded most of the songs during class and study breaks at a Harvard recording studio. After recording the album, lead vocalist David-Andrew "D.A." Wallach sent the work to several record labels. The band received recording contract offers from Kanye West's GOOD Music, Jermaine Dupri's Island Def Jam Music Group, Pharrell Williams Star Trak Entertainment and several independent record labels; they ended up signing with Star Trak.

== Critical reception ==
Professional ratings
Review scores
| Source | Rating |
|---|---|
| Allmusic | 3/5 stars |
| Blender | 1/5 stars |
| The Boston Globe | (favorable) |
| Entertainment Weekly | (B+) |
| NME | (3/10) |
| Okayplayer | (75/100) |
| Rolling Stone | 3/5 stars |
| Spin | 3.5/5 stars |
| Vibe | (favorable) |

Love the Future received generally mixed reviews from music critics, receiving an aggregated score of 59 out of 100 on Metacritic. Christopher Muther of The Boston Globe felt that the album was "too wise" and "too catchy" to possibly be the debut of Chester French. He compared the songs to that of the band Fountains of Wayne. Heather Phares of Allmusic called the album "much better" when the duo "tones down the hyperactivity and sticks to making songs with ridiculously ingratiating hooks". Wallach's voice was compared to that of Carl Wilson of The Beach Boys.

== Track listing ==
All songs written and composed by David-Andrew "D.A." Wallach and Maxwell Drummey.

1. "Introduction" – 1:07
2. "C'mon (On My Own)" – 3:22
3. "Bebe Buell" – 3:38
4. "String Interlude" – 0:57
5. "The Jimmy Choos" – 3:15
6. "Time to Unwind" – 1:44
7. "Fingers" – 4:16
8. "Country Interlude" – 5:37
9. "Beneath the Veil" – 2:47
10. "Neal" – 3:36
11. "Not Over You" – 4:24
12. "She Loves Everybody" – 3:59
13. "Sleep" – 4:13
14. "Pleasure Squad" – 3:40 (Amazon.com bonus track)
15. "People" – 3:17 (iTunes bonus track)

== Personnel ==
- Jeremiah Alvera – assistant
- Matt Antonowicz – trumpet
- Kevin Arndt – engineer
- Andrew Bergman – bass violin
- Julia Boynton – tap soloist
- Mike Bozzi – mastering
- Mikey Canzonetta – assistant
- Damien Chazelle – drum kit
- Maxwell Drummey – arranger, guitars, basses, keyboards, drums, percussion, synthesizers, marimba, xylophone, timpani, violin, theremin, programming, background vocals, engineer, producer
- Steve Fiascone – cello
- Scott Fruhan – background vocals
- Jeff Hefler – timpani
- Daniel Holter – engineer
- Mike Judge – bass, background vocals
- Matthew Kan – strings
- Clara Kim – strings

- Laura Krentzman – strings
- Sharan Leventhal – strings
- Marissa Lieata – strings
- Nick Machen – saxophone
- Laura Meyer – tuba
- Amy Ng – strings
- Barry Oosterwaal – trombone
- Neil Pogue – audio mixing
- Robin Ryczek – strings
- Eric Segnitz – strings
- Sopen Shah – strings
- Matt Tahaney – engineer
- Richard Tremarello – French horn
- D.A. Wallach – lead vocals, engineer, producer
- Tyler Wood – piano, mixing
- Adrien Zitoun – strings

== Charts ==
| Chart (2009) | Peak position |
|---|---|
| U.S. Billboard 200 | 77 |
| U.S. Billboard Comprehensive Albums | 82 |
| U.S. Billboard Top Digital Albums | 19 |
| U.S. Billboard Top Internet Albums | 77 |
