= Robert Wood (roboticist) =

American roboticist

Robert J. Wood is a roboticist and a professor of electrical engineering at the Harvard School of Engineering and Applied Sciences and the Wyss Institute for Biologically Inspired Engineering at Harvard University, and is the director of the Harvard Microrobotics Laboratory. At Harvard, he directs the NSF-funded RoboBees project, a 5-year project to build a swarm of robotic bees.

== Background ==
Wood received a BS in electrical engineering from Syracuse University in 1998. He received a PhD in electrical engineering in 2004 from the University of California, Berkeley under Ron Fearing with a thesis titled Composite microstructures, microactuators and sensors for biologically inspired micro air vehicles.

== Awards ==
- 2018 Max Planck-Humboldt Medal
- 2014 National Geographic Emerging Explorer
- 2012 Alan Waterman Award
- 2008 MIT Technology Reviews TR35 list
- 2008 DOD Presidential Early Career Award for Scientists and Engineers
- 2008 NSF CAREER Award
- 2008 ONR Young Investigator Program (YIP) Award
- 2008 AFOSR Young Investigator Program (YIP) Award
- 2006 DARPA Young Faculty Award

== Article ==
- The Robobee Project Is Building Flying Robots the Size of Insects by Robert Wood, Radhika Nagpal and Gu-Yeon Wei in the March 11, 2013 Scientific American
