= Chester French =

American indie pop band

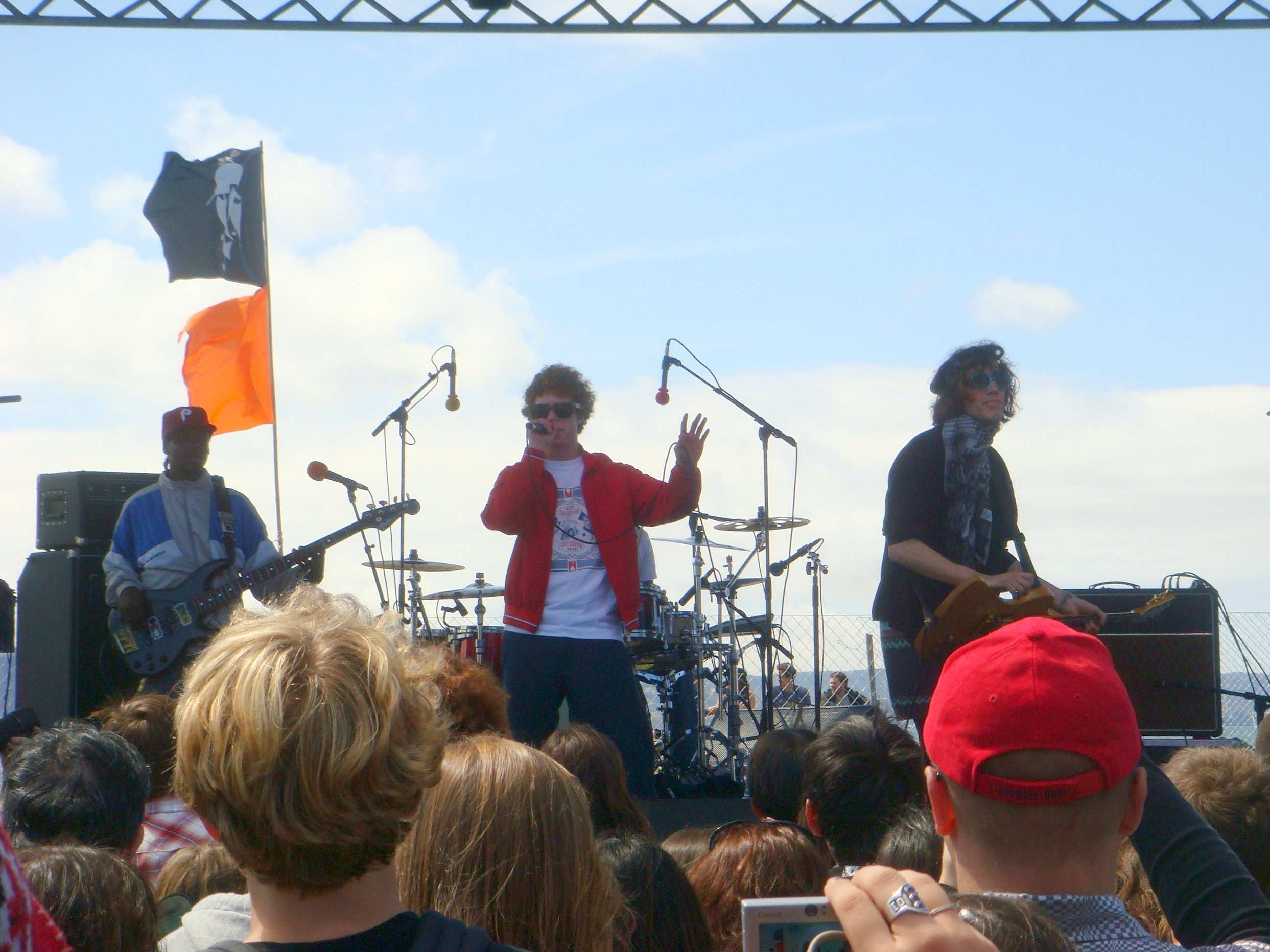
- Chester French in 2008

Background information
- Origin: Cambridge, Massachusetts, U.S.
- Genres: Indie pop; synthpop; neo-psychedelia; futurepop; alternative hip hop
- Years active: 2003–2013
- Labels: Star Trak; Interscope; K-LP; Karmaloop
- Past members: Maxwell Drummey; Michael William Judge; David-Andrew 'D.A.' Wallach; Damien Chazelle; Justin Hurwitz
- Website: www.chesterfrench.com

Chester French was an American indie pop band consisting of lead vocalist and songwriter David-Andrew 'D.A.' Wallach, and multi-instrumentalist Maxwell Drummey. They met as college students at Harvard University, naming their band after sculptor Daniel Chester French, who designed the statue at the Lincoln Memorial, the John Harvard statue, and the Minuteman statue at the Concord battleground in Massachusetts.

Milwaukee-raised Wallach and Boston native Drummey formed the band with three other classmates, playing various campus functions, and ultimately moved in a direction influenced by classic British Northern Soul. Wallach handled most of the vocals, while Drummey performed much of the composition with instruments, supplemented with an occasional special guest.

== History ==
=== 2003–2004: Formation and early career ===
Chester French was originally a five-piece band that formed in 2003 in their freshman year in Harvard University. In addition to lead vocalist David-Andrew 'D.A.' Wallach and multi-instrumentalist Maxwell Drummey, the band's lineup also included Grammy, Oscar, and Golden Globe-winning pianist and percussionist Justin Gabriel Hurwitz, bassist Michael William Judge and drummer Damien Sayre Chazelle, who went on to become a successful film director. Wallach originally auditioned as the group's drummer, but decided to become the lead vocalist due to his rapping ability. The band released their first extended play (EP), First Love, in 2004. The band described their music as "Gentlemen Rock", which combined elements of jazz and classical music.

The band played out and sold numerous copies of their independently released CD on the streets of Cambridge, Massachusetts. As Wallach tells "The Improper Bostonian" when asked if they busk in Harvard Square:

"We did. The summer after our freshman year we created a little EP, and we sold it on the street. If people were reluctant to buy it, we'd offer to play them something live, with the agreement that if they liked our performance, they'd buy the CD for five bucks."

=== 2005–2008: Recording contract ===
After paring down the group, its current lineup set out to learn how to record and produce music. They took on jobs at Harvard's Quad Studios, where R&B producer and fellow Harvard Alum Ryan Leslie also got his start.

It was at the school's studio (and through its numerous clients) that the duo's sound came together.

"The studio we had at school wasn’t actually affiliated with the music program there. That’s sort of an independent student group that Max and I were actually kind [of] running too. We were actually engineering there as commercial engineers so even when we were getting the record deal, we were still recording weird a cappella groups and viola players to pick up some cash on the side. It was good too because we were able to learn how to record all kinds of different music and instruments and all that knowledge ends up being a resource when you’re working out your own project."

Over the course of the next few years, the duo began putting together a demo. The time put in yielded a demo with varied production styles and numerous instruments, sometimes within a single song.

The demo spread quickly and attracted attention from Kanye West and Jermaine Dupri, among others. Engineer Andrew Coleman passed it to Pharrell Williams, whose Star Trak label eventually won a bidding war over who would sign the band.

Pharrell, in an introduction of the band in front of an audience in New York, briefly mentioned the bidding war:

"There's something at Star Trak records that we have been very excited about and there's, I don't know. Of course D.A. would want me to sit here and tell you how much of a crazy bidding war there was for them, as everybody in here knows D.A. But you know what? He's right. And if you think about it, think about where they come from and... okay! It's funny. But you know what? Think about it man. Like, Harvard grads? And then on top of that, there really was a bidding war and it really was incredible and we really lost our minds and you're really about to see a great, incredible show."

After landing at Star Trak at the end of their senior year at Harvard, the group moved to Los Angeles and continued work on their debut album, "Love The Future". The move inspired the song, "Bebe Buell", which the band says, during performances, is "about LA Girls."

Soon after graduating, one of their unmastered songs, "She Loves Everybody", ended up in the premiere episode of the 4th season of "Entourage", "Welcome to the Jungle", which aired June 17, 2007.

=== 2009-2011: Love the Future ===
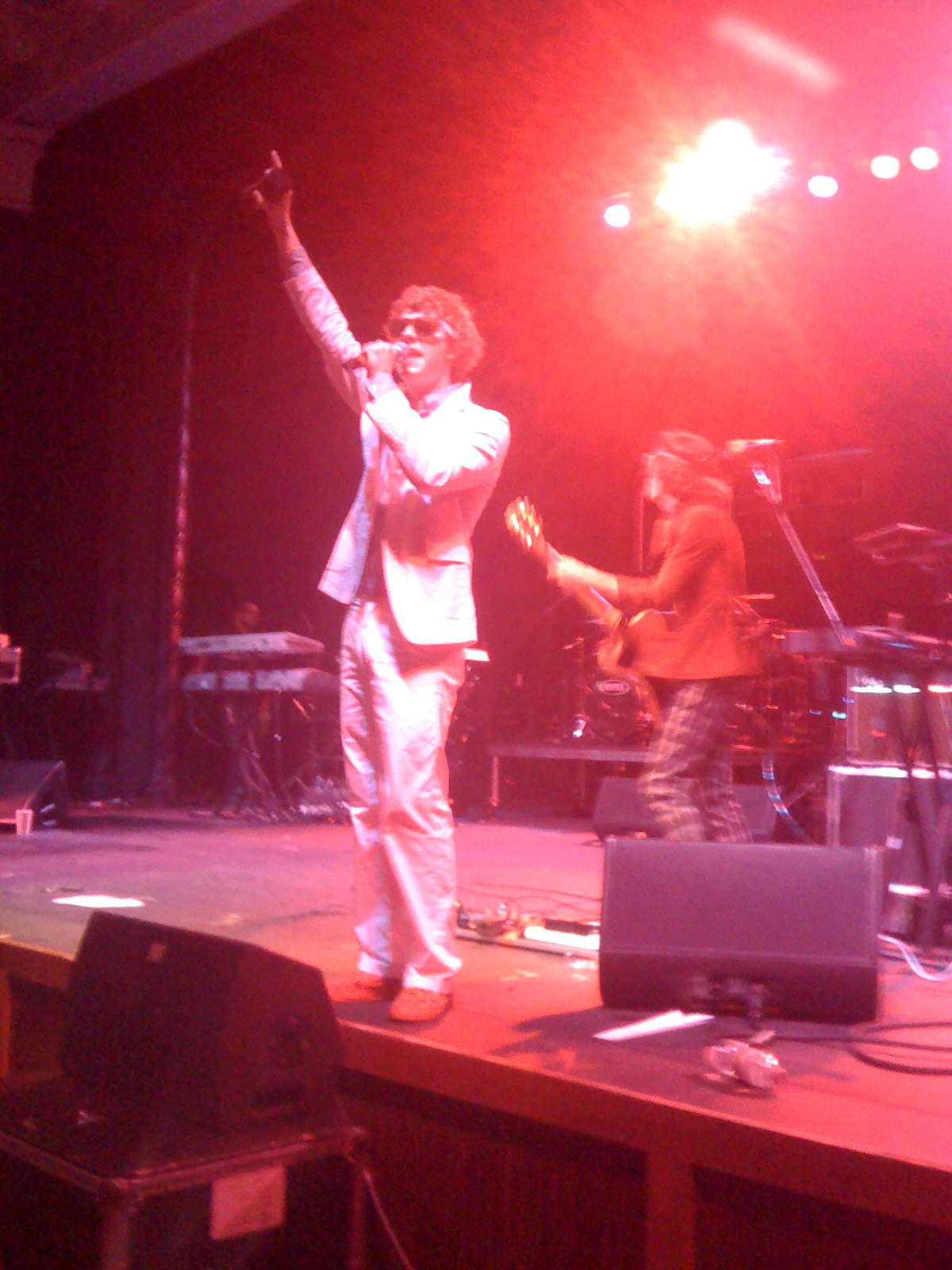
Chester French performing at The Rave in Milwaukee, Wisconsin

In early April 2009, Chester French and popular mixtape and club DJ Clinton Sparks recorded and released a mixtape on the internet, called Jacques Jams, Vol 1: Endurance. It has since spread onto various websites and across Twitter. The mixtapes features 24 tracks and has numerous guest appearances from R&B and hip-hop stars. The guests include Solange Knowles (on the track "Two Mans"), Kardinal Offishall & N.O.R.E. (on "No Parents Allowed"), Cassie (on "Chloe Jones"), Pusha-T of the Clipse (on "Campus Kingpin"), Bun B of UGK, Talib Kweli & Mickey Factz (on "I'm So Tall"), Janelle Monáe (on "Nerd Girl"), Diddy and Jadakiss (on "Ciroc Star"), the Mad Rapper (on "Mad Rapper"), Wale (on "I'm Sorry"), and Pharrell Williams and Jermaine Dupri (on "Life in LA").

In addition to all new tracks, the band included "The Jimmy Choos", "She Loves Everybody" and "C'Mon" from their debut album, "Love The Future" as well as the unreleased track "Out At The Compound", their yet-to-be-released remix of Lady Gaga's "Love Game" and "What A World", the Common song produced by Pharrell Williams that the duo appeared on (which is off Common's album, "Universal Mind Control".)

As recording came to a close, the band's first single, "She Loves Everybody", was released. The initial run of the single was in a limited edition condom package designed by Zach Larner. The duo decided to build a live show, so they hired the brother-brother touring musician team of Omar and Manny Dominick and keyboardist Tyler Wood. Matt Oestreicher replaced Tyler Wood when he had other obligations.

The newly formed live version of Chester French debuted at the 2008 South By Southwest festival and have toured on and off since. They supported N.E.R.D. on three tours (one with rapper Common), Matisyahu and Lady Gaga's The Fame Ball Tour. The band then released the song for retail on iTunes and Amazon in October, which was quickly followed by the release of the "She Loves Everybody" EP, which features the single, the band's song "Jimmy Choos" and remixes of "She Loves Everybody" by The Neptunes and DJ Steve Aoki and a remix of "Jimmy Choos" by hip-hop producer El-P. Bronx, NY rapper Mickey Factz and J.A.M.E.S. Watts released an unofficial remix of the group's song "Jimmy Choos". After the group heard the song, they got into the studio with Factz and collaborated on a track that will appear on his debut.

The group has collaborated with Talib Kweli and singer Res for their song "Fall Back", a song released during the waning days of the Democratic primaries that was aimed at Hillary Clinton. The song appeared on the political website "The Daily Kos". Their debut album, Love the Future, was released with Star Trak/Interscope Records on April 21, 2009. The duo produced and engineered the album themselves in their college dorm at Harvard College. The duo is currently in the studio working on their second album and mixtape.

D.A. Wallach collaborated with Maybach Music Group rapper Rick Ross on the track "Play Your Part" for his mixtape "Ashes To Ashes" (released December 24, 2010). The song also features Meek Mill and Wale. It is 6 out of 11 songs that were released on the tape.

=== 2011–2013: Music 4 Tngrs ===
Max went out on tour playing drums for Travie McCoy March and April 2011.

D.A. Wallach tweeted to fans that Chester French will be releasing their newest single on April 17, 2012, along with their new music video.

The single "Black Girls" as well as accompanying music video was released on April 18, 2012, garnering generally positive reviews albeit controversy about the song's bold lyrics and subject matter. Another single, "Interesting Time", was released on May 21, 2012, on Purevolume. The duo's second studio album, Music 4 Tngrs, was released on June 19, 2012.

== Press ==
The band is notable for the amount of press generated about them in their short time as a signed band (which just recently released their debut). Rolling Stone Magazine listed the band as one of their "Artists To Watch" in their March 2008 issue. The magazine described "She Loves Everybody" as an "ode to safe sex [that] mixes a Euro film-soundtrack vibe with synth beats - mood music for the thinking bachelor's pad."

The duo have also been featured in L'uomo Vogue, Fashion Rocks, Vibe, Vanity Fair, Details, Interview, GQ, Teen Vogue, Nylon, FUZE Magazine and The Improper Bostonian (where the duo was featured on the cover).

Many of the articles showcase Wallach and Drummey's sense of humor, as their answers to many questions in interviews resemble the oddball responses Bob Dylan gave during interviews.

For example, when asked by MTV how Chester French started, Wallach states:

"Chester French started when we were freshmen in college. Max wanted to start a group called Marilyn Manson, which is what he told me in the dining room. And I thought that was a great idea. So we realized there was a conflict, potentially, with the name, but the underlying concept was great and so that's what we've been trying to achieve ever since."

When asked why hip-hop stars enjoy their music, Wallach satirically explains:

"They find it interesting that we're the first artists to wear whiteface all the time, publicly."

Chester French are also notable for having been one of the first bands to use Facebook for promotion and fan interaction, as they were freshmen and gigging musicians at Harvard the year Mark Zuckerberg launched the website.

The band toured with Blink 182 in the summer of 2009 among other notable bands such as Taking Back Sunday, Fall Out Boy, Panic! at the Disco and Weezer, with September 13 being their final night on the tour.

Chester French appeared on "Jimmy Kimmel Live!" on April 21, 2009 where they performed "C'mon".

== Musical style ==
Chester French's sound generally contains elements of pop and rock. The band compared their approach to their pop sound with hip hop, stating "the mentality is informed a lot by hip-hop production". The band's arrangements were inspired by The Zombies' 1968 album, Odessey and Oracle.

== Discography ==
=== Albums ===
Year	Album details
2009	Love the Future: Release date: April 21, 2009; Label: Star Trak, Interscope
2012	Music 4 Tngrs: Release date: June 19, 2012; Label: K-LP Karmaloop

=== Mixtapes ===
- Jacques Jams, Vol. 1: Endurance (2009)
- Jacques Jams, Vol. 2: Stamina (TBD)

=== Singles ===
Year	Title	Chart positions				Album
Year	Title	Billboard Hot 100	Hot Singles Sales	Hot Dance Singles Sales	UK	Album
2008	"She Loves Everybody"	—	2	1	—	Love the Future
2012	"Black Girls" (featuring Travis Barker)	—	—	—	—	Music 4 Tngrs
"—" denotes releases that did not chart

=== Guest appearances ===
Year	Song	Album
2008	"Fall Back" (Idle Warship featuring Chester French)	Non-album single
2008	"What a World" (Common featuring Chester French)	Universal Mind Control
2009	"As I Em" (Asher Roth featuring Chester French)	Asleep in the Bread Aisle
2009	"Dancing Like A White Girl " (Masta Ace & Edo G featuring Chester French)	Arts & Entertainment
2010	"Get Loose" (Reflection Eternal featuring Chester French)	Revolutions per Minute
2010	"Gotta Get Up" (Asher Roth & Nottz featuring DA of Chester French)	The Rawth EP
2010	"Play Your Part" (Rick Ross featuring Meek Mill, Wale, & D.A. of Chester French)	Ashes To Ashes
2011	"Big Hype" (Patrick Stump featuring DA & Driis)	Truant Wave
	"Clouds" (Tim William featuring DA )	TBA
	"Got It made" (The M Machine featuring DA )	TBA

=== Music videos ===
Year	Song	Director
2009	"She Loves Everybody"	Paul Hunter

=== Remixes ===
Lady Gaga - LoveGame (3:18) - 2009
