= Claudia Fischbach =

German biophysicist

- Education: University of Regensburg; Harvard University
- Scientific career
- Workplaces: Cornell University; Harvard University
- Thesis: Adipose tissue engineering development of a 3-D model system of adipogenesis. (2004)

Claudia Fischbach is a German bioengineer who serves as the James M. and Marsha McCormick Director of Biomedical Engineering and the Stanley Bryer 1946 Professor of Biomedical Engineering at Cornell University. She is Director of the Cornell Physical Sciences Oncology Center on the Physics of Cancer Metabolism.

== Early life and education ==
Fischbach earned a master's degree in pharmacy from LMU Munich. She worked toward her doctorate in pharmaceutical technology at the University of Regensburg. She then moved to Harvard University, where she worked in tissue engineering as a postdoctoral researcher.

== Research and career ==
In 2007, Fischbach joined Cornell University, where she started using biomedical engineering to better understand how to treat cancer. The progression of cancer is influenced by interactions with nearby cells and the extracellular matrix. Despite that, the majority of cancer studies do not replicate conditions outside the body. Fischbach uses tissue engineering to design systems that let her lab model and investigate how these interactions influence tumor cells. She uses model systems to understand the biological strategies tumors adopt to modify bodily function, become more aggressive, and metastasize.

Fischbach has extensively investigated the fundamental mechanisms that underpin breast cancer. For example, she showed that obesity can change the composition of breast tissue, which can promote disease progression. Moreover, she was supported by the Human Frontier Science Program to study the impact of breast cancer on the material properties of bone. She showed that exercise, which is often prescribed to prevent bone loss, could also help to protect people against metastatic cancer. In addition, her research demonstrated that breast cancer can trigger distant bone growth, which could be a preemptive defense against metastasis.

== Awards and honors ==
- 2015 Public Voices Fellow of The OpEd Project
- 2016 Fellow of the American Institute for Medical and Biological Engineering
- 2017 Alexander von Humboldt Foundation
- 2018 Fellow of the Biomedical Engineering Society
- 2022 Cornell University College of Engineering EPICC Award
- 2023 Biomedical Engineering Society Cellular and Molecular Bioengineering Momentum Award

== Selected publications ==
- Siyoung Choi, Matthew A Whitman, Adrian A Shimpi, ... Claudia Fischbach (7 August 2023). "Bone-matrix mineralization dampens integrin-mediated mechanosignalling and metastatic progression in breast cancer." Nature Biomedical Engineering. PMID 37550422.
- Bo Ri Seo, Xingyu Chen, Lu Ling, ... Claudia Fischbach (8 May 2020). "Collagen microarchitecture mechanically controls myofibroblast differentiation." Proceedings of the National Academy of Sciences. PMID 32385149.
- Bo Ri Seo, Priya Bhardwaj, Siyoung Choi ... Claudia Fischbach (19 August 2015). "Obesity-dependent changes in interstitial ECM mechanics promote breast tumorigenesis." Science Translational Medicine. PMID 26290412.
- Maureen E Lynch, Daniel Brooks, Sunish Mohanan, ... Claudia Fischbach (3 May 2013). "In vivo tibial compression decreases osteolysis and tumor formation in a human metastatic breast cancer model." Journal of Bone and Mineral Research. PMID 23649605.
- Claudia Fischbach, Hyun Joon Kong, Susan X Hsiong, ... David J Mooney (6 January 2009). "Cancer cell angiogenic capability is regulated by 3D culture and integrin engagement." Proceedings of the National Academy of Sciences. PMID 19126683.
