= Circuit Scribe =

Pen containing conductive ink

Circuit Scribe is a ball-point pen containing silver conductive ink one can use to draw circuits instantly on flexible substrates like paper. Circuit Scribe made its way onto Kickstarter (an online site where people can fund projects) on November 19, 2013, with its goal of raising $85,000 for the manufacturing of the first batch of pens. By December 31, 2013, Circuit Scribe was able to raise a total of $674,425 with 12,277 'backers' or donors.

Similarly to drawing a picture, users can use a Circuit Scribe pen to draw lines on a simple piece of paper. They can then attach special electrical components on the drawn lines which allows the electrical currents to run through the components. This replaces the use of breadboards and wires.

== Development ==
A team of researchers in Electroninks Incorporated, a startup company located at Research Park of the University of Illinois at Urbana-Champaign, created a water-based, non-toxic conductive ink that was noted as the Invention of the Month by Popular Science. The team began by developing a prototype using pens from a different company and replacing the ink with their special silver ink. Once completed, they started a Kickstarter campaign to earn funding for a mass production of the final form of the pens.

=== Team ===
The researching team consists of S. Brett Walker, Jennifer A. Lewis, Michael Bell, Analisa Russo, and Nancy Beardsly. Walker is the CEO of Electroninks and the co-founder along with Lewis, Bell, and the director of product development, Russo. Bell is also the chief operating officer while Beardsley is the technical support and user experience.

=== Prototype ===
The prototype pens are hand-cleaned Sakura Gelly Roll Metallic pens. The ink is replaced with the researchers' silver conductive ink. In order to have the right amount of ink flow to make smooth lines, the ink is precisely tuned.

=== Ink ===
The ink is created by placing an aqueous solution of silver nitrate into a flask of water combined with polyacrylic acid (PAA) and diethanolamine (DEA), the capping agent and reducing agent, respectively. After about twenty hours, the silver nitrate is dissolved, forming particles with a diameter of about 5 nanometers. In order to enlarge the size of the particle to an average diameter of about 400 nanometers, the flask is placed on a heated sonicator, a device that produces high-intensity ultrasound. Once cooled, the solution is poured into a larger flask and the thick precipitate, an insoluble solid which is formed is scraped out. From there, ethanol is added to coagulate the particles, or change the particles to a solid state. Most of the supernatant, the liquid lying above a layer of the precipitate, is then poured out so the remaining liquid can be centrifuged, or separated. After the process of centrifugation, the particles are placed back in water and forced through a syringe filter to remove unnecessary particles in the solution. Next, hydroxyethyl cellulose (HEC) is added as a binder and the entire mixture is homogenized. The solvents are allowed to evaporate until the ink has a desired viscosity or thickness.

Once the ink is created, a roller ball pen is dismantled and cleaned so the ink can be placed inside using a flat tip spatula. After replacing the roller ball tip, a couple blasts of compressed air is shot from the back end to force the ink into the tip. The outer cover of the pen is replaced and the prototype of the Circuit Scribe is created. From there, the team launched its Kickstarter campaign.

=== Kickstarter Campaign ===
Circuit Scribe launched its campaign on Kickstarter to receive funding and included a list of pledges which people could donate a certain amount and get a corresponding gift:

- Pledge $5+: STEM Education Workbook
- Pledge $20+: Circuit Scribe
- Pledge $25+: Early Bird Basic Kit
- Pledge $30+: Basic Kit
- Pledge $35+: Early Bird Basic Kit + Book
- Pledge $40+: Basic Kit + Book
- Pledge $45+: Early Bird Maker Kit
- Pledge $50+: Maker Kit
- Pledge $90+: Gift Pack
- Pledge $100+: Developer Kit
- Pledge $175+: Circuit Scribe Bundle
- Pledge $190+: Early Bird Classroom Kit
- Pledge $200+: Classroom Kit
- Pledge $500+: Component Designer
- Pledge $5,000+: Electroninks Show & Tell

They also included stretch goals which include:

- $250,000: Circuit Scribe Edu Platform & STEM Outreach
- $650,000: Magnetic Sheet for Kit Activity Books & Maker Notebooks
- $1,000,000: Resistor Pen

== Modules ==
Circuit Scribe can be used to draw circuits that connect different types of modules, or individual components, such as:

=== Power ===
- USB Power Adapter: Allows user to power the drawn circuits with either a USB port or a wall outlet.
- 9V Battery Adapter: Supplies a nine-volt power to the circuits.

=== Input ===
- SPST Switch: An on/off switch that allows users to control the electrical circuit.
- DPDT Switch: Two switches that direct the flow of current through the circuit.
- Light Sensor: Shines light on the phototransistor to control an output.
- Potentiometer 10k Ohm: A knob that controls the dimness, volume, and speed of circuit.

=== Connect ===
- 2-Pin Adapter: Allows user to connect resistors, capacitors, or sensors to circuits.
- NPN Transistor: An electrical amplifier that converts small signals into large currents.
- Blinker: Blinks output components on and off at adjustable rates.
- DIY Boards: Allows user to solder 2, 4, 6, or 8 pin components to the board.
- Connector Cables: Connects the paper circuit to DIY hardware platform.

=== Output ===
- Bi-LED: Two LEDs in one that can flip directions to change the color.
- Buzzer: Vibrates in response to the voltage.
- Motor: Rotates with an applied voltage.
- RGB LED: A red, blue, and green LED.

== Uses ==
The Circuit Scribe allows the user to draw electrical circuits in any shape with its silver ink. With this aspect and its ability to connect different types of modules, it is possible to produce simple designs like an Arduino, an open-source electronic platform based on hardware and software.

=== Arduino ===
Circuit Scribe allows users to create a paper Arduino (or a ‘paperduino’), which is demonstrated by the research team. The team first found the schematics on the Arduino website and modified them so that they would work on a pen plotter. With a few modifications, they arranged the components and traces so that the board could be printed in a single layer. The alignments are set to 0.6 millimeters to match the width of the pen traces with a minimum distance of 0.1 millimeters. The pen plotter only prints lines and does not fill the patterns, so they designed large pads out of concentric circles and built up the pads for the components with some extra line features. This allows for a stronger conductivity. It is important to put chips close together to minimize the line resistance between them, but not so close that it is difficult to place the components. They used components from the 1206 package which are a bit larger than the original components from the Arduino. Before exporting the layout, they deselected every layer of the file except the top layer of traces. After exporting the file in .dxf format, both the wire width and the fill area options were deselected and the files were saved. Finally, the team measured the size of the board layout and dragged it onto a new sheet on Silhouette Studio. From there, the vertical height was adjusted to 2.945 inches and the speed was set to 1 in order to lay down the most ink when printed. The team went on to place components like resistors, capacitors, and LEDs on the printed silver ink. Components can be attached using tweezers and super glue, but can be reinforced using conductive epoxy.

== Extras ==
=== Resistor Pen ===
As posted on their Kickstarter campaign, the creators of Circuit Scribe planned to develop resistor pens one can use to draw resistors the way one can use the Circuit Scribe to draw circuits. Although their stretch goal of $1,000,000 was not met by the deadline on the campaign, the team still managed to create them.
