= Conductive ink =

Ink that conducts electricity

Conductive ink is an ink that results in a printed object which conducts electricity. It is typically created by infusing graphite or other conductive materials into ink. There has been a growing interest in replacing metallic materials with nanomaterials due to the emergence of nanotechnology. Among other nanomaterials, graphene, and carbon nanotube-based conductive ink are gaining popularity due to their high electrical conductivity and high surface area. Recently, more attention has been paid on using eco-friendly conductive ink using water as a solvent as compared to organic solvents since they are harmful to the environment. However, the high surface tension of water prevents its applicability. Various natural and synthetic surfactants are now used to reduce the surface tension of water and ensure uniform nanomaterials dispersibility for smooth printing and wide application. Although graphene oxide inks are eco-friendly and can be produced in bulk quantities, they are insulating in nature which needs an additional step of reduction using reducing ink is required to restore the electrical properties. The external reduction process is not suitable for large scale continuous manufacturing of electronic devices. Hence an in-situ reduction process also known as reactive inkjet printing has been developed by various scientists. In the in-situ reduction process the reducing inks are printed on top of the GO printed patterns in order to carry out the reduction process on the substrate.

Silver inks have multiple uses today including printing RFID tags as used in modern transit tickets, they can be used to improvise or repair circuits on printed circuit boards. Computer keyboards contain membranes with printed circuits that sense when a key is pressed. Windshield defrosters consisting of resistive traces applied to the glass are also printed.

Conductive inks have many potential uses in textile applications, but several complications can make this difficult. The inks must stand up to regular wear and washing if they are intended to be worn, and the uneven surface of fabric can lead to poor adhesion, although solutions to these problems are being researched.

== Current and prospective uses ==
These inks are commonly used for RFID systems, the traceability of certain products and are expected to develop in the medical, veterinary, agri-food, access control and security fields, anode and cathode printing (e.g. for "printable" enzyme batteries or for the printing of piezoelectric devices printed flexible or elastic recovering energy from movement based on organic materials P(VDF-TrFE).

Around 2015, they began to be available on the industrial market on an industrial scale. At the end of the 2000s, elastic polymer inks could already be used in "soft robotics". In the future, nanoinformatics hopes to be able to print functional electronic microcircuits, for example for nanorobots or microrobots.

Some (at Harvard University and MIT) have developed "biosensitive" inks for temporary patches or for real so-called smart tattoos (printed biosensors). Once on or in the skin, the ink gives indications of temperature or health status, for example by turning from blue to brown depending on the sugar level in the interstitial fluid (see diabetes), or from purple to pink depending on the pH of the skin and changing intensity according to the salt level. Theoretically, such tattoos could remain invisible and only appear when the wearer is sick, or in a particular light. A tattoo could appear or change color in case of high UV or air pollution, etc. The health sector is often cited as an example but other uses are possible.

== Environmental sustainability issues ==
In addition to the health risks associated with the production/use of nanoparticles, they could encourage an explosion in the marketing of a number of light display devices, as well as so-called "communicating" and/or "smart" surfaces, objects, buildings and vehicles thanks to the ease of printing presence, pressure and temperature sensors on a wide variety of media. Manufacturers argue that electronics will thus be lightened or even diffuse (the motherboard disappears in favor of printing on structural or exterior parts, replacing screens, microphones, keys, joysticks and buttons) which is presented as a source of savings. But a "rebound effect" is a priori foreseeable in terms of resource and electricity consumption. The market for conductive inks for the automotive industry is expected to grow from €100 million in 2019 to €2 billion in 2024. From 30 to 40 today, the number of sensors in a car could increase to a hundred without weighing down the vehicle.

== See also ==
- Circuit Scribe
- Etching
- Organic solar cell
- Teledeltos
