= Jennifer A. Lewis =

American materials engineer (born 1964)

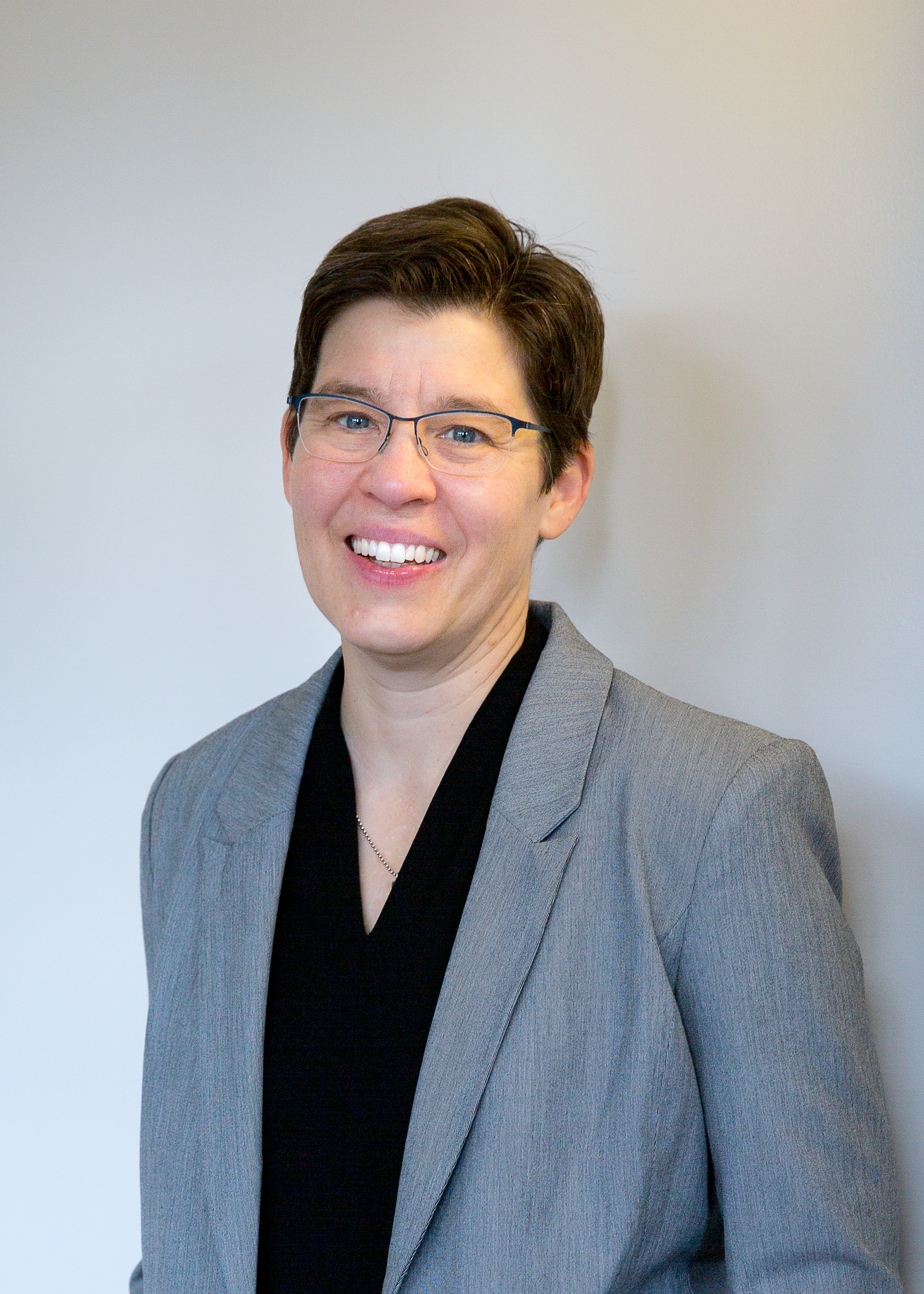
- Lewis in 2017
- Born: Jennifer Ann Lewis; 1964 (age 61–62)
- Education: University of Illinois, B.S.; MIT, Sc.D.
- Known for: 3D printing; Directed assembly of soft functional materials
- Awards: National Academy of Sciences member; National Academy of Engineering member; National Academy of Medicine member; American Academy of Arts and Sciences member; NSF Presidential Faculty Fellow Award
- Scientific career
- Workplaces: Harvard University; University of Illinois at Urbana–Champaign
- Thesis: Binder Distribution Processes in Ceramic Green Tapes During Thermolysis (1991)
- Doctoral advisor: Michael J. Cima

Jennifer A. Lewis (born 1964) is an American materials scientist and engineer, best known for her research on colloidal assembly of ceramics and 3D printing of functional, structural, and biological materials.

In 2017, Lewis was elected as a member of the National Academy of Engineering for the development of materials and processes for 3-dimensional direct fabrication of multifunctional structures. In 2026, she was elected to the National Academy of Medicine for her "groundbreaking work in 3D bioprinting of soft and living materials".

== Education and early career ==
Lewis graduated with a B.S. degree from the University of Illinois at Urbana-Champaign with high honors in ceramic engineering in 1986 and earned a Sc.D. in ceramic science from Massachusetts Institute of Technology in 1991 under the direction of Michael J. Cima. The title of her dissertation is Binder Distribution Processes in Ceramic Green Tapes During Thermolysis. From 1990 to 1997 she was an assistant professor at the University of Illinois, and was also affiliated as a research professor with the Beckman Institute for Advanced Science and Technology.

== Later career ==
Lewis was promoted to associate professor in 1997 and to professor in 2003. In 2002, she co-edited the book Polymers in Particulate Systems: Properties and Applications to which she also contributed a chapter titled "Colloid-filled Polymer Gels: a Novel Approach to Ceramics Fabrication". In 2006 Lewis was named interim director and subsequently became director of UIUC's Frederick Seitz Materials Research Laboratory in 2007.

In 2013, she moved to Harvard University as Hansjörg Wyss Professor of Biologically Inspired Engineering in Harvard's School of Engineering and Applied Sciences.

== Research ==
Lewis's laboratory works on the directed assembly of soft functional materials. This work involves microfluidics, materials synthesis, complex fluids, and robotic assembly to design functional materials. She develops novel materials that can find potential application as printed electronics, waveguides, and 3D scaffolds and microvascular architectures for cell culture and tissue engineering. She co-leads the Wyss Institute's 3D Organ Engineering Initiative.

In 2013, Lewis' team released the world's first 3D printed battery, made from two different electrode inks.

Lewis is the author of more than 160 papers and holds 12 patents, including patents for inventions as varied as methods to 3D print functional human tissue and microbattery cells.

She is a founder of Voxel8, a company that manufactures a 3D printing platform capable of printing new functional materials, whose investors include In-Q-Tel and Braemar Energy Ventures.

Lewis is also a co-founder of Electroninks, Inc., a company that produces a reactive silver ink used in the printed electronics market, as well as in biomedical and electronic circuitry markets. The company launched a Kickstarter campaign on November 20, 2013, with the goal of raising $85,000 to help with the production of a pen called Circuit Scribe that can create electronic circuits. After only fifteen days into the campaign, backers had pledged $451,698 towards the product. When the Kickstarter campaign closed on December 31, 2013, a total of $674,425 was raised for Circuit Scribe by 12,277 backers.

Her publications have been cited more than 79,000 times by other scholars.

== Awards and honors ==
Lewis is a member of the American Academy of Arts and Sciences (elected 2012), the National Academy of Engineering (elected 2017), the National Academy of Sciences (elected 2018) and the National Academy of Medicine (elected 2026). With her NAM election, Lewis became one of a small number scientists to be named to all three national academies.

She is also a Fellow of the American Ceramic Society, the American Physical Society, the Materials Research Society, and the National Academy of Inventors.

She has received the National Science Foundation Presidential Faculty Fellow Award (1994), the Schlumberger Foundation Award (1995), the Brunauer Award and Robert B. Sossman Award from the American Ceramic Society (2003; 2016), the Materials Research Society Medal (2012), and the Langmuir Lecture award from the American Chemical Society (2009).

In 2014, she was named by Foreign Policy magazine as one of the year's "100 Leading Global Thinkers".

In 2017, Lewis was awarded the Lush Science Prize for her team's work on developing a multi-material bioprinting platform for fabricating 3D human organ-on-chip models, which could eliminate the use of animal testing by the pharmaceutical and cosmetic industries.

In 2018, Lewis was named as the Jianming Yu Professor of Arts and Sciences by the Harvard Stem Cell Institute, in recognition of her "excellence in research, leadership, teaching". The five-year chair will support Lewis and her team's research to advance progress in stem cell and regenerative medicine.

In 2019, Lewis was awarded an honorary Doctorate of Science by the University of Edinburgh.

In September 2020, Lewis was honored with one of three Genius Awards presented by the Liberty Science Center at their annual Genius Gala.

Lewis was the 2020–2021 Distinguished Lecturer for the Hagler Institute for Advanced Study at Texas A&M University.

In January 2025, the National Academy of Sciences awarded Lewis the James Prize in Science and Technology Integration, in recognition of her "contributions in living materials science that have far-ranging applications in bioprinting".

In November 2025, Lewis was awarded the Sigma Xi Gold Key Award, for "groundbreaking contributions at the intersection of engineering, materials science and applied research".
