= Emulate =

American biotechnology company

Emulate, Inc.
- Type: Private
- Industry: Biotechnology
- Headquarters: Boston, Massachusetts, US
- Area served: Worldwide
- Key people: Jim Corbett (CEO & board member); Donald Ingber (Scientific founder, board member, & advisory board chairman); Daniel Levner (Co-founder, CTO, & board member)
- Number of employees: 119
- Website: emulatebio.com

Emulate, Inc. (Emulate) is a biotechnology company that commercialized Organs-on-Chips technology—a human cell-based technology that recreates organ-level function to model organs in healthy and diseased states. The technology has applications in pharmaceutical research, product development, testing how different medicines, chemicals, and foods affect human health. Emulate has also worked with Cedars-Sinai Medical Center on a precision medicine initiative that uses Organs-on-Chips technology in the clinical setting. This initiative is designed to provide clinicians with better data about how an individual patient may respond to treatment. The company also signed a Cooperative Research and Development Agreement (CRADA) with the U.S. Food and Drug Administration to advance and qualify its Human Emulation System to meet regulatory evaluation for product testing.

== Technology ==
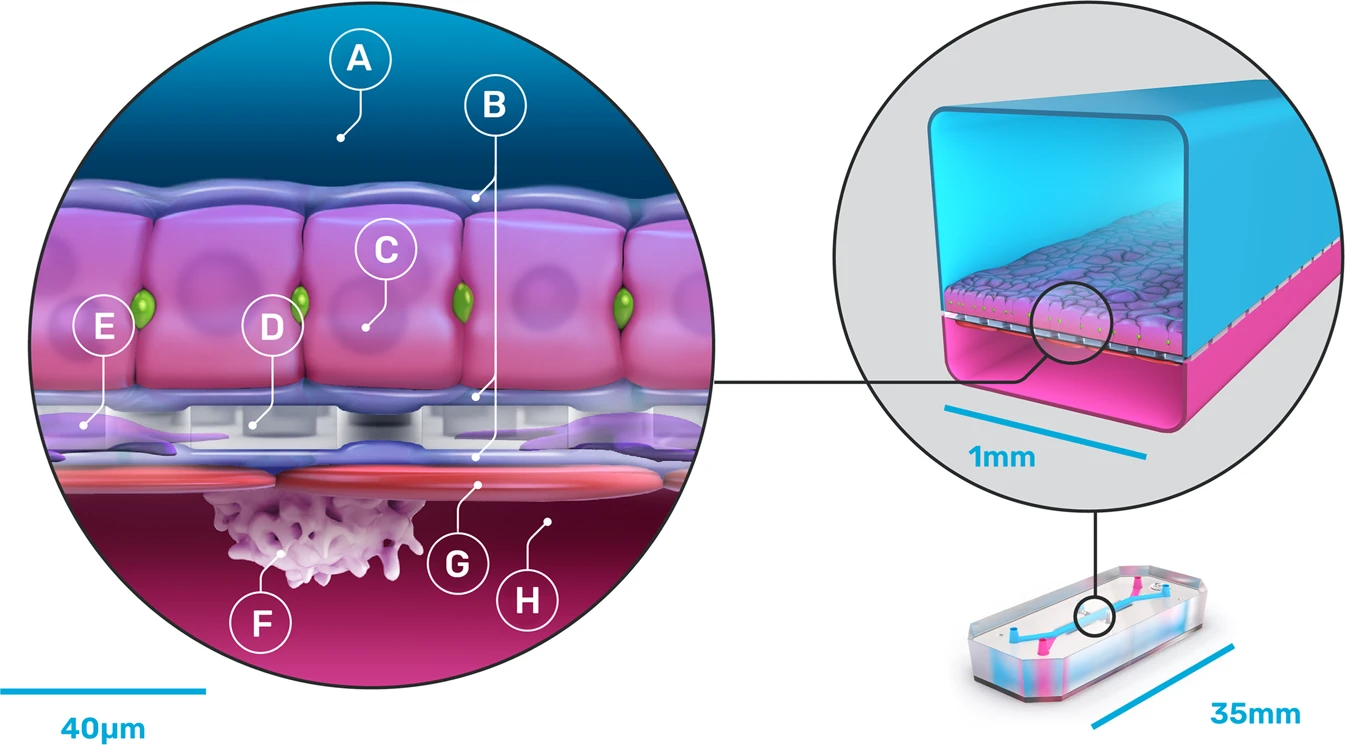
Schematic of the Emulate liver-chip

Emulate's Organs-on-Chips technology has been used to recreate the function of a variety of different organs, including the liver, intestine, brain, kidney, and lung. The company's Organ-Chips are about the size of a AA battery and feature two fluidic channels that create the flow of blood and other fluids. The chips are made of a flexible polymer and can be stretched to recreate similar motions to those of breathing or peristalsis. The company has developed a Human Emulation System that combines its Organ-Chips along with hardware and software apps. The system is designed to reduce some of the complexities of working with Organs-on-Chips technology and is built around the Organ-Chip, which recreates the microenvironment of an organ that is found within the body. An instrument called Zoë Culture Module provides pressure driven flow and recreates perfusion pressure and shear forces like those experienced in the human body.

== History ==
Emulate was spun out from the Wyss Institute for Biologically Inspired Engineering at Harvard University, where the technology was initially invented and then extensively developed. Scientific Founder Donald Ingber founded the company around 2013. James Coon was co-founder and the first CEO. Jim Corbett is the current CEO.

=== Funding ===
In July 2014, the founders raised $12 million in a first round of financing. In March 2016, the company raised a Series B round of investment of $28 million from repeat and new investors, including NanoDimension, ALS Finding a Cure, Atel Ventures and Laboratory Corp. of America Holdings. In February 2018, Emulate formed strategic partnerships with Roche, a Swiss-based pharmaceutical company, and Takeda, a pharmaceutical company based in Japan. The company raised its most recent round of funding in June 2018 when they announced that they had raised a Series C round of funding led by Silicon Valley–based capital firm Founders Fund. In September 2021, the company raised a Series E round of $82 million.

== See also ==
- Donald E. Ingber
- D. A. Wallach
