= Omowunmi Sadik =

Nigerian professor, chemist, and inventor

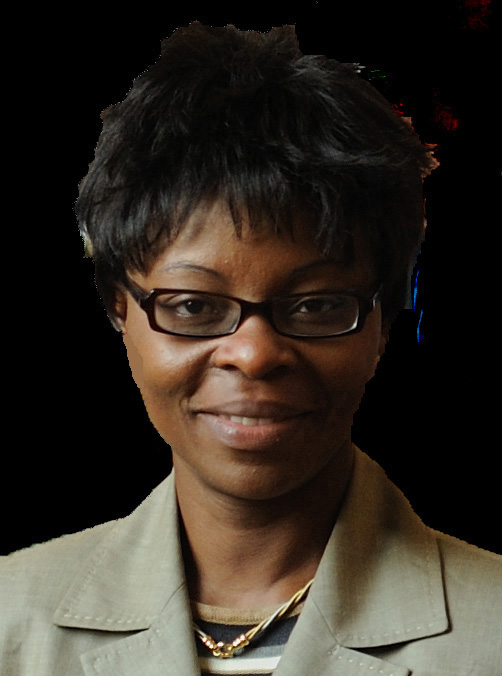
- Sadik in 2010
- Born: 1964 (age 61–62); Lagos, Nigeria
- Education: University of Lagos, Wollongong University
- Scientific career
- Fields: Surface chemistry, Environmental nanotechnology
- Workplaces: New Jersey Institute of Technology
- Notable students: Samira Musah

Omowunmi "Wunmi" A. Sadik (born 19 June 1964) is a Nigerian-American professor, chemist, and inventor working at New Jersey Institute of Technology. She has developed microelectrode biosensors for detection of drugs and explosives and is working on the development of technologies for recycling metal ions from waste, for use in environmental and industrial applications. In 2012, Sadik co-founded the non-profit Sustainable Nanotechnology Organization.

== Early life and education ==
Sadik was born in 1964 in Lagos, Nigeria. Her family included a number of scientists, who supported her interests in physics, chemistry, and biology. She received her bachelor's degree in chemistry from the University of Lagos in 1985, and went on to receive her master's degree in chemistry in 1987. Sadik then attended Wollongong University in Australia. In 1994, she received her Ph.D. degree in chemistry from Wollongong.

== Career ==
A postdoctoral fellowship from the National Research Council supported her as a researcher at the U.S. Environmental Protection Agency from 1994 to 1996. She then accepted a position as an assistant professor of chemistry at the Binghamton University in Binghamton, New York. She was promoted to associate professor in 2002, and full professor in 2005. At that time, she also became director of the Center for Advanced Sensors & Environmental Systems (CASE) at Binghamton. In 2019, Dr. Sadik moved to the New Jersey Institute of Technology (NJIT), as chair of the Department of Chemistry and Environmental Sciences and director of the NJIT BioSensors Materials for Advanced Research & Technology (The BioSMART Center). She has also served as a visiting faculty member at the Naval Research Laboratory, Cornell University, and Harvard University. In 2024, she was appointed as the inaugural Vice Provost for Faculty Affairs at NJIT.

Sadik studies surface chemistry, with particular emphasis on the development of biosensors for use in environmental chemistry. She has found that conducting polymers are especially promising for use in sensing applications. She has developed microelectrode biosensors sensitive to trace amounts of organic materials, technology which can be used for drug and bomb detection. She is also studying detoxification mechanisms of wastes such as organochlorine compounds in the environment, with the purpose of developing technologies for recycling metal ions from industrial and environmental waste. In one project, microbial enzymes increased the conversion of highly toxic chromium (VI) to non-toxic chromium (III) from 40% to 98%. Sadik is credited with more than 135 peer-reviewed research papers and patent applications. She holds U.S. patents on particular types of bichair oors. In 2011, she was the chairperson of the inaugural Gordon Conference on Environmental Nanotechnology. In 2012, Sadik and Barbara Karn co-founded the Sustainable Nanotechnology Organization, a non-profit, international professional society for the responsible use of nanotechnology worldwide.

Sadik is an elected fellow of the Royal Society of Chemistry (2010), the American Institute for Medical and Biological Engineering (2012), the American Chemical Society (2023), and the National Academy of Inventors (2024). She is involved with the Environmental Protection Agency and the National Science Foundation, and was part of the National Institutes of Health Study Panel on Instrumentation and Systems Development. She is involved in international collaborations with the UNESCO International Center of Biodynamics in Bucharest, Romania, Ege University in Turkey, and the University of Fukui in Japan.

== Awards ==
- 2000, National Research Council (NRC) COBASE fellowship
- 2001, Chancellor's Award for Research in Science and Medicine, SUNY
- 2002, Chancellor's Award for Premier Inventors, SUNY
- 2003–2004, Distinguished Radcliffe Fellowship from Harvard University
- 2005–2006, NSF Discovery Corps Senior Fellowship
- 2016, Nigerian National Order of Merit Award (NNOM)
- 2017, Jefferson Science Fellow
- Australian Merit Award
- 2023, American Chemical Society Fellow
- 2024, National Academy of Inventors (NAI) fellowship
- 2024, The Wallace H. Coulter Award for Lifetime Achievement, Pittcon
