= D. A. Wallach =

American musician and business executive (born 1985)

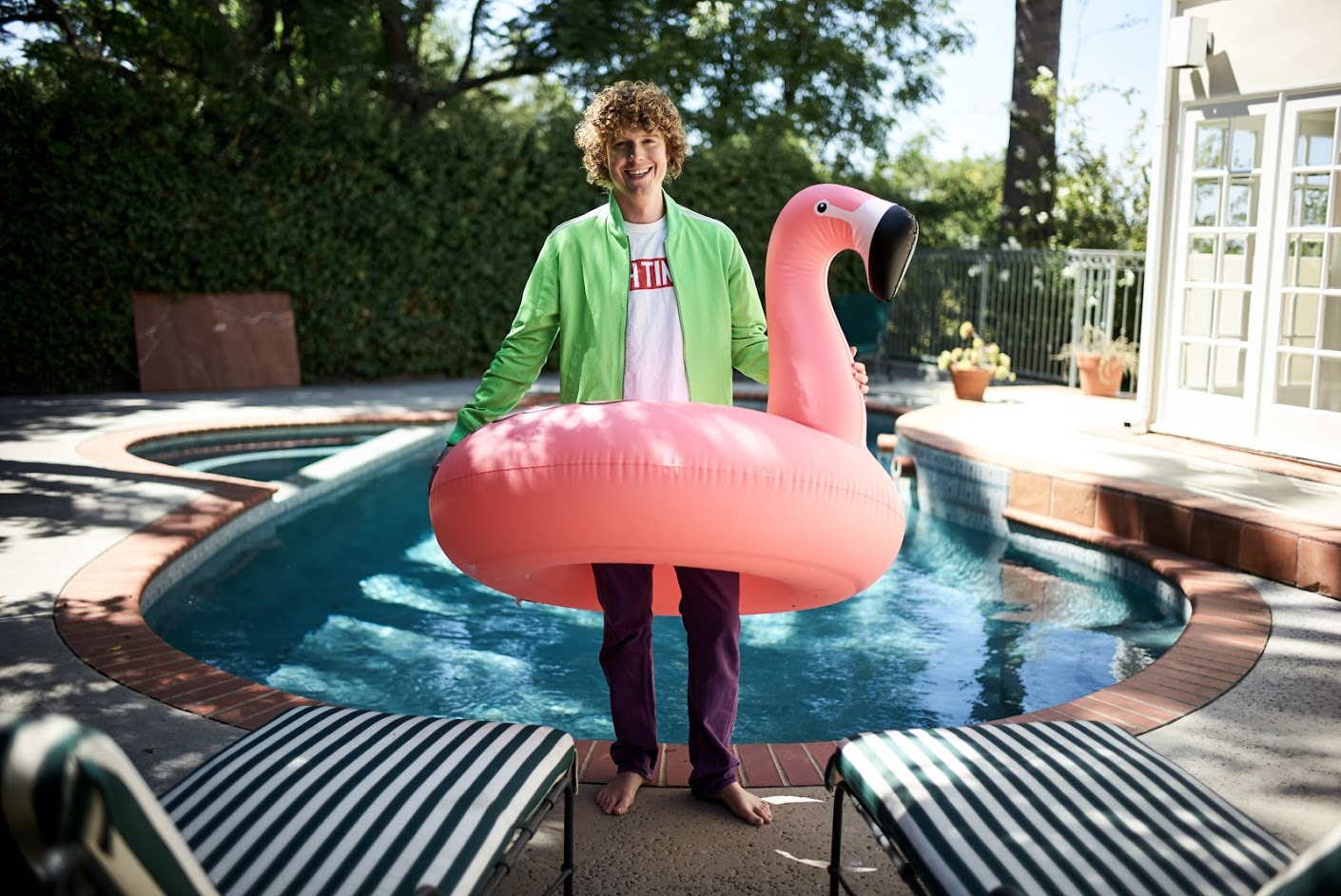
- Wallach in 2017

Background information
- Birth name: David-Andrew Wallach
- Also known as: D.A.
- Born: March 2, 1985 (age 40); Denver, Colorado, U.S.
- Genres: Traditional pop
- Occupations: Singer; songwriter; record producer; businessman
- Years active: 2003–present
- Labels: Harvest; Capitol; Star Trak
- Formerly of: Chester French
- Website: www.dawallach.com

David-Andrew Wallach is an American singer and businessman. He was the lead vocalist of the indie rock band Chester French from 2003 until its 2013 disbandment, and signed with Harvest Records, a subsidiary of Capitol Records as a solo act in the latter year. He was also a former artist-in-residence at Spotify, a company where he was an early investor. In his other ventures, he has invested in or served as an advisor for companies including SpaceX, Emulate, Synthego, Beam Therapeutics, Glympse Bio, Ligandal, and Ripple.

== Early life and education ==
He was born David-Andrew Wallach in Denver, Colorado, and moved to Appleton, Wisconsin, before he was two years old. He attended the University School of Milwaukee, where he was a two-time national finalist in the Federal Reserve's Fed Challenge monetary policy competition.

Wallach went on to attend Harvard University. During his time at Harvard, he studied African-American studies under Henry Louis Gates Jr. and graduated in 2007, receiving both the Alain Locke Prize for the most outstanding scholar in African-American Studies and the Andrew Ramroop prize. He received Harvard's first certificate in the Bantu language Gikuyu. While at Harvard, he auditioned against future Academy Award-winning director Damien Chazelle for the role of drummer in future Academy Award-winning composer Justin Hurwitz's band; Chazelle won and Wallach became the lead singer.

== Career ==
=== Early career and Chester French ===
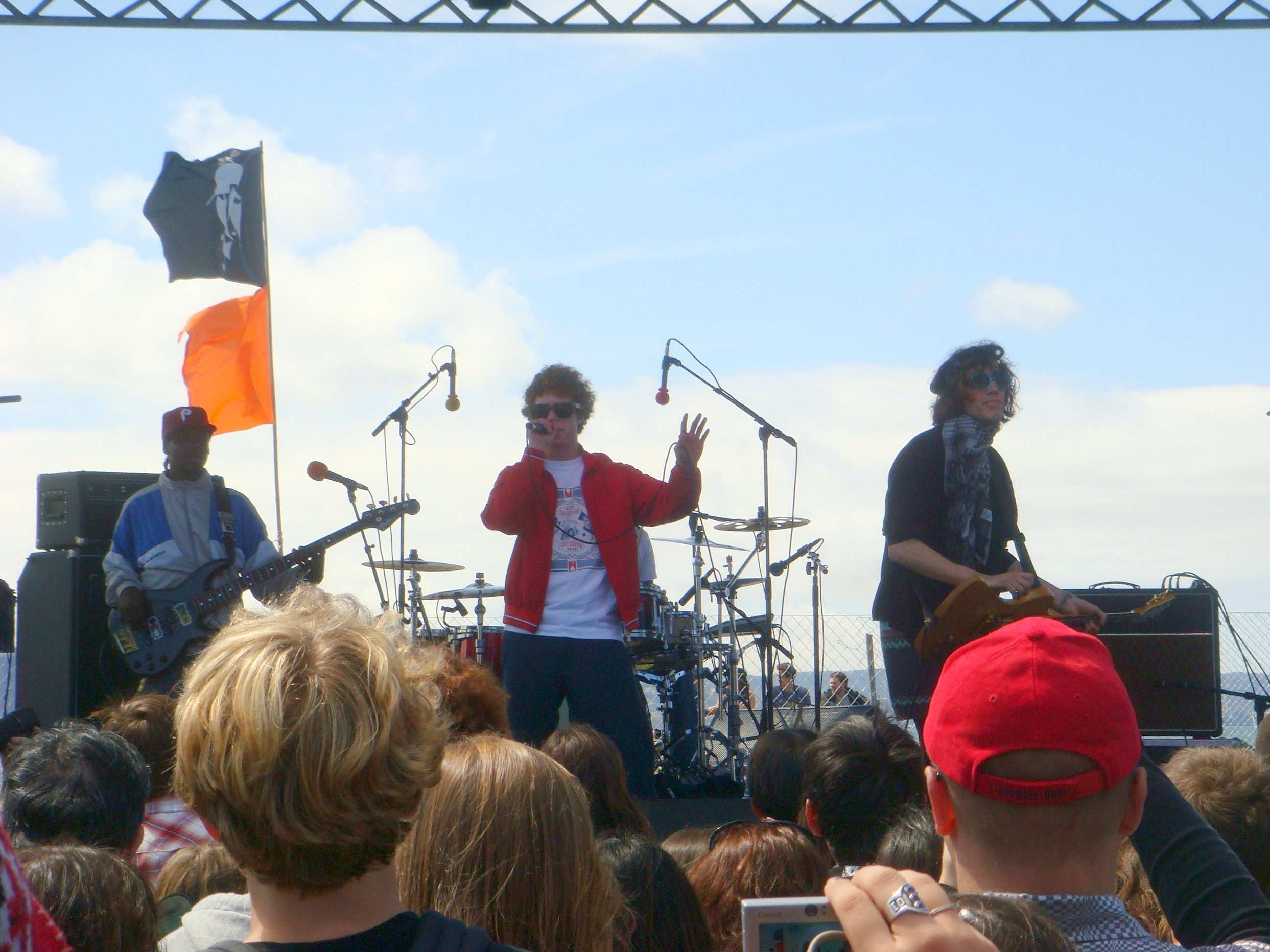
Wallach performing with Chester French in Treasure Island, California, in 2008

He was initially discovered by Kanye West, Jermaine Dupri and Pharrell Williams while he was attending Harvard and leading the band Chester French. Wallach's music style of classic pop has been compared to musicians such as the Beatles and the Beach Boys.

Wallach co-founded the group Chester French in 2003 with Harvard schoolmate Maxwell Drummey. Wallach worked as a recording engineer in Harvard's student recording studio, engineering and producing for Boston-area jazz musicians and working on Chester French's debut album at night. In 2007, Wallach sent out hundreds of demo CDs which led to a bidding war between West, Dupri, and Williams. Just prior to Wallach's graduating from Harvard, Williams signed the group to his Star Trak Entertainment label, a partnership with Interscope Records. The group was known for being one of the first bands to use Facebook as a promotional tool to interact with fans, being freshmen at Harvard the same year that the site was launched by Mark Zuckerberg. He was also an early adopter of Twitter with over one million followers. During his time with Chester French, Wallach toured with bands such as N*E*R*D, Blink-182, and Weezer. The group's first album included the single "She Loves Everybody" which reached #1 on U.S. Billboard Hot Dance Singles Sales and #2 on U.S. Billboard Hot Singles Sales.

Chester French released two albums under the Star Trak record label, leaving in 2010 to release its third album independently. The third album featured collaborations with Williams, Pusha T, and Travis Barker.

=== Solo career, collaborations, and film ===
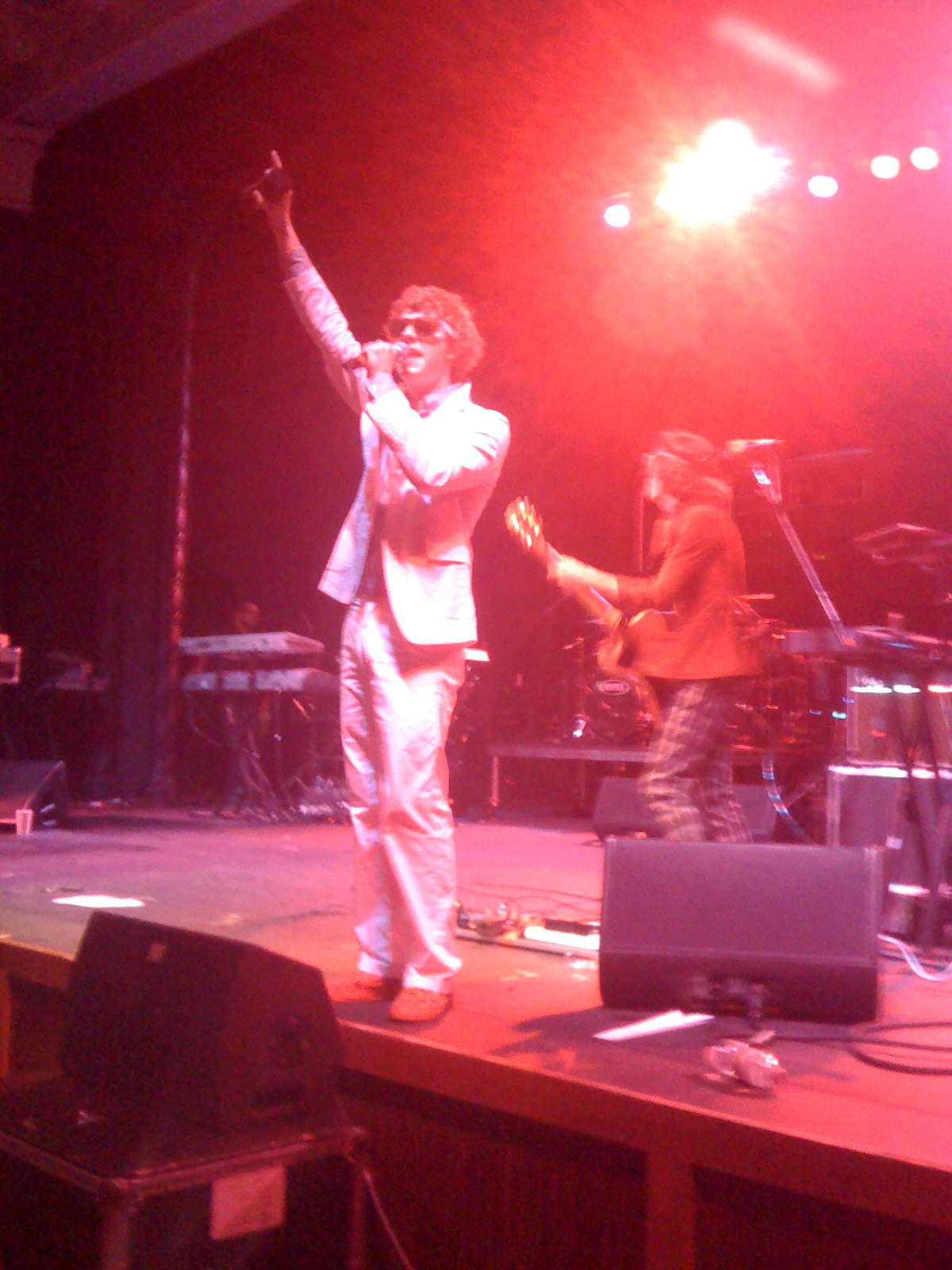
D.A. Wallach performing with Chester French at The Rave in Milwaukee, Wisconsin.

Outside of Chester French, Wallach has worked with Supa Dups, forming the group D.A. & the Supa Dups. They collaborated in 2011 and released two singles, "Who Do You Know" and "Too Cool" (feat. Vybz Kartel). Wallach originally met Supa Dups while he was doing studio work in Los Angeles. He also wrote and sang the hook for the song "Play Your Part" with Rick Ross, Wale, and Meek Mill in 2011. The song was a single on the first Maybach Music album, and Wallach also appeared in the 2011 music video for the song.

He appeared in the 2012 film Artifact produced by Jared Leto. The film was a documentary about Leto's band Thirty Seconds to Mars, its lawsuit against Virgin EMI Records, and the making of the album This Is War. Wallach also worked with Pharrell Williams to co-write the song "The Way It Is (Vector's Theme)", a song from the soundtrack for the 2010 film Despicable Me.

In 2013, Wallach began writing and recording music as a solo artist. He played his music for Odd Future and Frank Ocean's manager Chris Clancy, who then partnered with Harvest Records to release Wallach's solo project. He released his first single, titled "Glowing", in October 2013, which debuted in a music video directed by Tyler, the Creator. The video was originally released "anonymously" before Wallach came out as the singer of the song in an interview with MTV, who called it a "Beatles-esque love song." When asked why he released the video anonymously, Wallach stated that he just wanted people to enjoy the song. Wallach followed up with his second solo release, "Farm", in November 2013.

In 2016, Wallach had a small role in the musical film La La Land, working with former Harvard classmates and bandmates Damien Chazelle and Justin Hurwitz.

=== Business career ===
In 2011, Wallach was selected by Sean Parker, Shakil Khan, and Daniel Ek to be the official artist-in-residence for Spotify. In that capacity, he created and led the Artist Services team, which oversaw the company's relationships with musicians and managers, discussing how the service works, its payment model, and promotions. He has also driven different products for the company including its Artist Analytics dashboard and its merchandise and ticketing products. He has advocated publicly for subscription music services to be embraced by both artists and the music industry. Spotify's subscribers grew from one million to 20 million prior to him leaving the company in 2015.

Wallach has invested in and advised technology companies that have included Fancy, digital currency network Ripple, and telemedicine innovator Doctor On Demand. Wallach partnered with billionaire Ron Burkle in 2016 to form Inevitable Venture, a venture fund based in Los Angeles. He initially met Burkle at a Grammy party and helped him invest in Spotify.

Other investments by Wallach have included SpaceX and Emulate.

== Discography ==
=== Studio albums ===
List of studio albums, with year released
Title	Album details	Peak chart positions			
Title	Album details	US	CAN	AUS	UK
Time Machine	Released: October 16, 2015; Label: Harvest, Capitol	—	—	—	—

=== Singles ===
Year	Title	Chart positions				Album
Year	Title	Billboard Hot 100	Hot Singles Sales	Hot Dance Singles Sales	UK	Album
2013	"Glowing"	—	—	—	—	Time Machine
2013	"Farm"	—	—	—	—	Time Machine
"—" denotes releases that did not chart

=== Collaborations ===
For discography of Wallach as lead vocalist of Chester French, see main article on Chester French.

List of collaborations
Year	Title	Notes
2012	"Show Love"	Single by Chamillionaire featuring D.A.
2011	"Play Your Part"	Single by Rick Ross featuring D.A., Wale, & Meek Mill
2011	"Who Do You Know"	Single with Supa Dups as part of D.A. & the Supa Dups
2011	"Big Hype"	Single by Patrick Stump featuring D.A.
2011	"Too Cool"	Single with Supa Dups as part of D.A. & the Supa Dups, featuring Vybz Kartel
2010	"The Way It Is (Vector's Theme)"	With Pharrell Williams for the Despicable Me movie soundtrack

== Filmography ==
List of collaborations
Year	Title	Role
2012	Artifact	Self
2016	La La Land	New wave singer

== Awards and recognition ==
Wallach made Forbes' list of 30 Under 30 in music in 2011. He was also named one of the 100 Most Creative People in Business by Fast Company in 2013.
