= She Loves Everybody =

Single by Chester French

from the album Love the Future
- Released: November 18, 2008
- Genre: Indie pop; futurepop; neo-psychedelia
- Length: 3:59
- Label: Star Trak; Interscope
- Songwriter(s): David-Andrew Wallach; Maxwell Drummey
- Producer(s): Chester French

Chester French singles chronology
"She Loves Everybody" (2008)	"Black Girls" (2012)

"She Loves Everybody" is a song by the band Chester French. It is the first single from their debut album Love the Future.

The single was released as an EP and featured packaging in the style of a condom wrapper, due to the themes considered in the eponymous song, in particular referencing the lyric, "she craves affection, so I use protection." The duo followed up the release up by participating in MTV's GYT (Get Yourself Tested) campaign.

== Track listing ==
1. "She Loves Everybody" - 4:00
2. "She Loves Everybody (The Neptunes Remix)" - 3:45
3. "She Loves Everybody (Steve Aoki Remix)" - 3:57
4. "Wurlitzer Interlude" - 0:37
5. "Jimmy Choos" - 3:15
6. "Jimmy Choos (El-P Remix)" - 3:34

== Charts ==
Chart (2008/2009)	Peak Position
U.S. Billboard Hot Dance Singles Sales	1
U.S. Billboard Hot Singles Sales	2
