= Dante Pazzanese =

Brazilian physician and cardiovascular surgeon

Dante Pazzanese (December 31, 1900 – January 9, 1975) was a noted Italian-Brazilian physician and cardiovascular surgeon of São Paulo, the founder of the Institute of Cardiology of the State of São Paulo, which now bears his name.

Pazzanese was born in Barão de Monte Alto, Minas Gerais, Brazil. In addition to his work as a surgeon, he was the founder, on August 14, 1943, of the Brazilian Society of Cardiology, which is now the largest cardiology society in Latin America and the 3rd in the world. He died in São Paulo, aged 74.
