= Donald E. Ingber =

American cell biologist and bioengineer (born 1956)

Donald Ingber
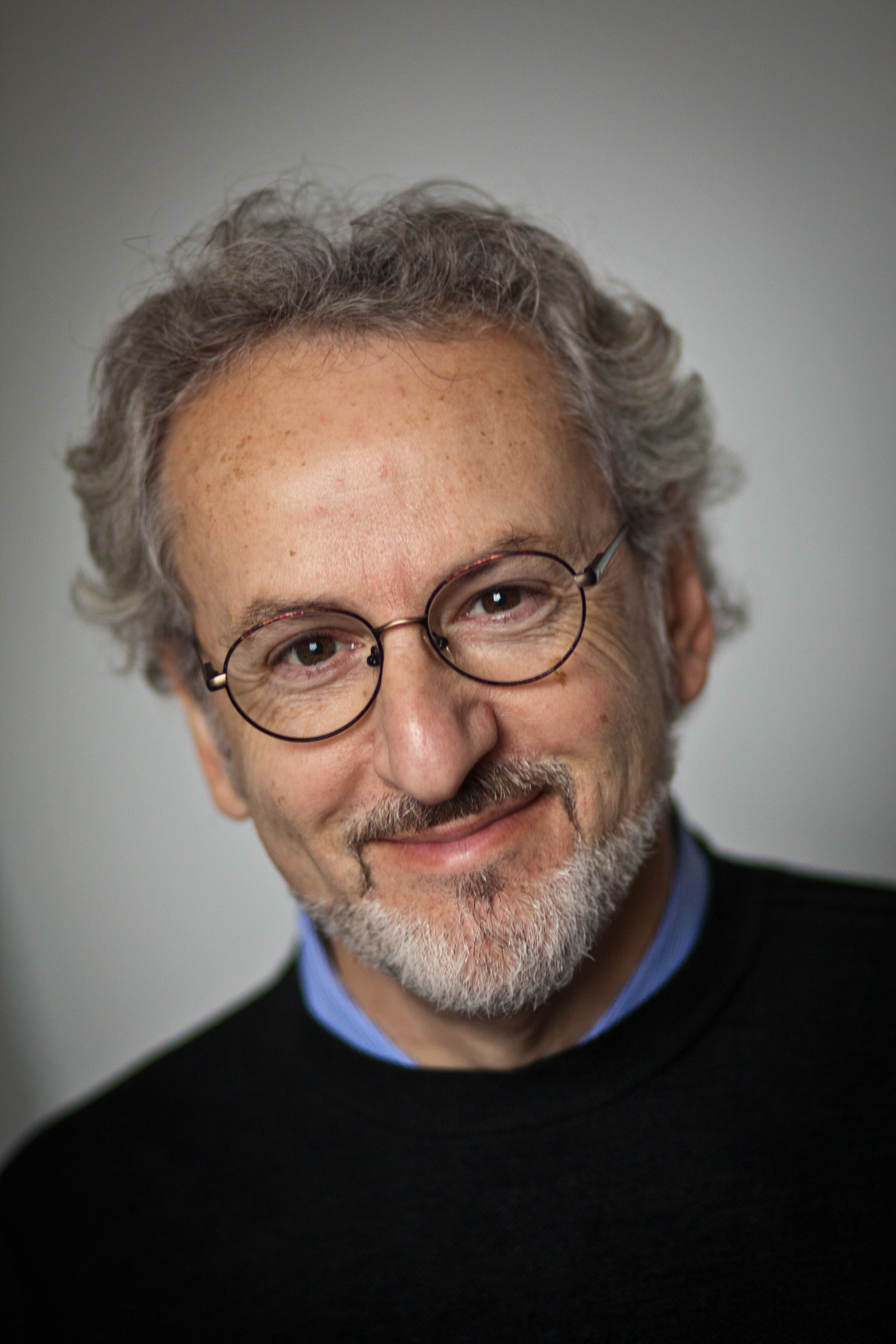
- Ingber in 2010
- Born: 1956; East Meadow, New York

Academic background
- Education: Yale College and Yale Graduate School of Arts and Sciences

Academic work
- Institutions: Royal Marsden Hospital; Harvard University
- Notable students: Samira Musah; Javier G. Fernandez

Donald E. Ingber (born 1956) is an American cell biologist and bioengineer. He is the founding director of the Wyss Institute for Biologically Inspired Engineering at Harvard University, the Judah Folkman Professor of Vascular Biology at Harvard Medical School and Boston Children's Hospital, and Professor of Bioengineering at the Harvard John A. Paulson School of Engineering and Applied Sciences. He is also a member of the American Institute for Medical and Biological Engineering, the National Academy of Engineering, the National Academy of Medicine, the National Academy of Inventors, and the American Academy of Arts and Sciences.

Ingber is a founder of the emerging fields of biologically inspired engineering. He has made pioneering contributions to numerous other disciplines including mechanobiology, cytoskeletal biology, extracellular matrix biology, integrin signaling, tumor angiogenesis, tissue engineering, nanobiotechnology, systems biology, and translational medicine. Ingber has authored more than 470 publications in scientific journals and books, and is an inventor on more than 190 patents spanning anti-cancer therapeutics, tissue engineering, medical devices, drug delivery systems, biomimetic materials, nanotherapeutics, and bioinformatics software.

Ingber has been scientific founder of five companies: Neomorphics, Inc., a tissue engineering startup which led to clinical products through subsequent acquisitions (Advanced Tissue Sciences Inc.); Tensegra, Inc. (formerly known as Molecular Geodesics, Inc.,) which 3D-printed medical devices; and most recently, Emulate, Inc., which formed to commercialize human "organs-on-chips" that accelerate drug development, detect toxicities and advance personalized medicine by replacing animal testing; Boa Biomedical, Inc. (originally known as Opsonix, Inc.), which aims to reduce deaths due to sepsis and blood infections by removing pathogens from the blood; and FreeFlow Medical Devices, LLC, which develops special coatings for medical devices to eliminate the formation of blood clots and biofilms on materials.

== Education and academic research ==
Ingber grew up in East Meadow, New York. He received a combined B.A./M.A. in molecular biophysics and biochemistry from Yale College and Yale Graduate School of Arts and Sciences in 1977; an M.Phil. in cell biology from Yale Graduate School of Arts and Sciences in 1981; and a combined M.D./Ph.D. from Yale School of Medicine and Yale Graduate School of Arts and Sciences in 1984. At Yale, he carried out undergraduate research on DNA repair with Paul Howard-Flanders, and on cancer metastasis with Alan Sartorelli.

Ingber worked on development of cancer therapeutics with Kenneth Harrap at the Royal Cancer Hospital/Royal Marsden Hospital in England, with support from a Bates Traveling Fellowship. He carried out his Ph.D. dissertation research under the direction of Dr. James Jamieson in the department of cell biology, and his advisory committee included George Palade, Elizabeth Hay and Joseph Madri. From 1984 to 1986 he completed his training as an Anna Fuller Postdoctoral Fellow under the mentorship of Dr. Judah Folkman in the Surgical Research Laboratory at Boston Children's Hospital and Harvard Medical School.

== Scientific career ==
=== Appointments ===
- In 1986, Ingber became an instructor in pathology at Harvard Medical School, as well as a research associate in surgery at Boston Children's Hospital and in pathology at Brigham and Women's Hospital
- In 1993, appointed a research associate in pathology at Boston Children's Hospital
- In 1999, promoted to Professor of Pathology at Harvard Medical School
- In 2002, appointed a senior associate in the Vascular Biology Program at Boston Children's Hospital
- In 2004, Ingber became the first incumbent of the Judah Folkman Professorship of Vascular Biology at Harvard Medical School. As of December 2019, he currently holds this position.
- In 2008, appointed as Professor of Bioengineering at the Harvard School of Engineering and Applied Sciences. As of December 2019, he currently holds this position.
- In 2009, appointed as the Founding Director of the Wyss Institute for Biologically Inspired Engineering at Harvard University. As of 2020, he currently holds this position.
- In 2018, appointed to Friedrich Merz Guest Professorship at Goethe University.
- In 2021, elected to the National Academy of Engineering for interdisciplinary contributions to mechanobiology and microsystems engineering, and leadership in biologically inspired engineering.

=== Significant contributions ===
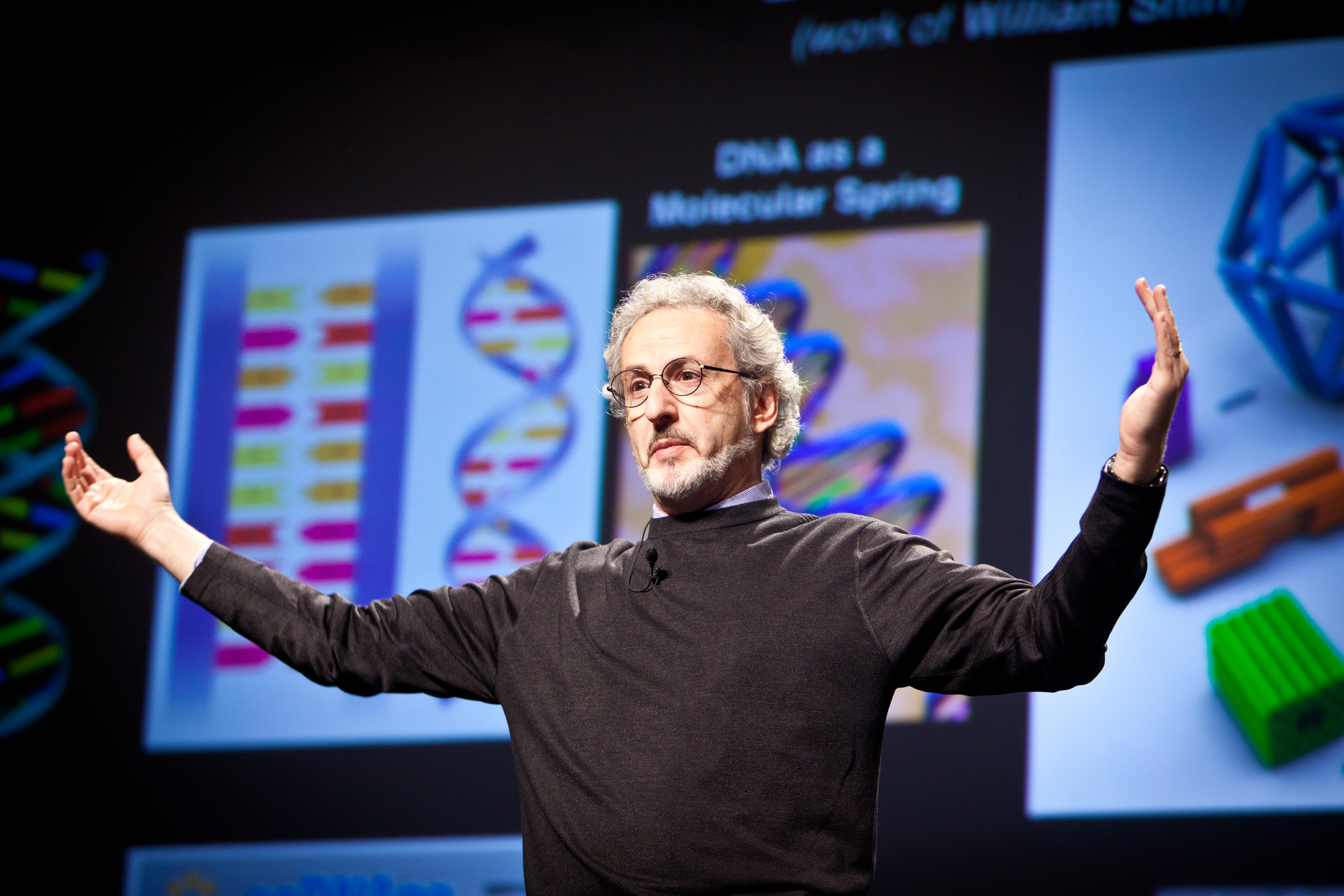
Ingber presenting at PopTech 2010

Ingber is best known for his discovery of the role mechanical forces play in developmental control and in cancer formation, and for his application of these principles to develop bioinspired medical devices, nanotechnologies, and therapeutics. Ingber's early scientific work led to the discovery that tensegrity architecture - first described by the architect Buckminster Fuller and the sculptor Kenneth Snelson - is a fundamental design principle that governs how living systems are structured, from individual molecules and cells to whole tissues, organs and organisms.

Ingber's work on tensegrity led him to propose that mechanical forces play as important a role in biological control as chemicals and genes do, and to investigate the molecular mechanism by which cells convert mechanical signals into changes in intracellular biochemistry and gene expression, a process known as "mechanotransduction." Ingber determined that living cells use tensegrity architecture to stabilize their shape and cytoskeleton, that cellular integrins function as mechanosensors on the cell surface, and that cytoskeletal tension (or "prestress," which is central to the stability of tensegrity structures) is a fundamental regulator of many cellular responses to mechanical cues. Ingber's tensegrity theory also led to the prediction in the early 1980s that changes in extracellular matrix structure and mechanics play a fundamental role in tissue and organ development, and that deregulation of this form of developmental control can promote cancer formation.

Ingber's contributions in translational medicine include discovery of one of the first angiogenesis inhibitor compounds (TNP-470) to enter clinical trials for cancer, creation of tissue engineering scaffolds that led to clinical products, development of a dialysis-like blood cleansing device for treatment of blood stream infections that is moving towards clinical testing, creation of a mechanically-activated nanotechnology for targeting clot-busting drugs to sites of vascular occlusion, and co-development of a new surface coating based on Slippery Liquid Infused Porous Surfaces (SLIPS) for medical devices and implants that could eliminate the conventional dependency on anticoagulant drugs that pose life-threatening side-effect risks.

One of his more recent innovations is the creation of tiny, complex, three-dimensional models of living human organs, known as "organs-on-chips" (Organ Chips), which mimic complicated human organ functions in vitro as a way to potentially replace traditional animal-based methods for testing of drugs and toxins. The first human Organ Chip, a human Lung Chip, was reported in Science in 2010. Created using microchip manufacturing methods, the Lung Chip is a complex three-dimensional model of a breathing lung that incorporates living human lung alveolar epithelial cells interfaced with endothelial cells within microfluidic channels cast in silicone rubber, which recapitulate structure and function of the tissue-vasculature interface of lung alveolus (air sacs). In 2012, Ingber and his team demonstrated in a study in Science Translational Medicine the ability to mimic a complex human disease on the Lung Chip — specifically pulmonary edema, known commonly as “fluid on the lungs” — and to identify new therapeutics using this model. As an alternative to animal studies, Organ Chips could be used to study the safety and efficacy of new drugs, accelerating the introduction of new drugs to market while significantly lowering research costs. Ingber's group has since expanded this technology to develop other model organs, including the intestine, kidney, bone marrow, blood-brain barrier, and liver. In 2012, Ingber's team was awarded a DARPA contract to string together multiple Organ Chips to build an automated human body-on-chips that will recapitulate whole-body physiology. This system could be used in combination with computational modeling to rapidly assess responses to new drug candidates, providing critical information on their safety, efficacy, and pharmacokinetics.

Other new technologies from Ingber's lab include development of a fully biodegradable plastic alternative inspired by natural cuticle material found in shrimp shells and insect exoskeletons, known as “Shrilk”; a mechanically activated nanotherapeutic that selectively directs clot-busting drugs to sites of vascular occlusion while minimizing unintended bleeding; an siRNA nanoparticle therapy that prevents breast cancer progression; a dialysis-like sepsis device that cleanses blood of all infectious pathogens, fungi and toxins without requiring prior identification; a surface coating for medical materials and devices that prevents clot formation and bacteria accumulation that reduces the need for use of conventional anticoagulant drugs that frequently result in life-threatening side effects, and a computational approach to diagnostics and therapeutics that incorporates both animation and molecular modeling software to virtually develop and test potential drugs designed to fit precisely into their targets’ molecular structures.

== Leadership and public service ==
Earlier in his career, Ingber helped to bridge Harvard University, its affiliated hospitals, and the Massachusetts Institute of Technology (MIT) through his involvement in the Center for Integration in Medicine and Innovative Technology, Harvard-MIT Division of Health Sciences and Technology, and Dana-Farber/Harvard Cancer Center. He also has been a member of the Center for Nanoscale Systems and the Materials Research Science and Engineering Center at Harvard, as well as the MIT Center for Bioengineering.

In 2009, Ingber was named Founding Director of the Wyss Institute for Biologically Inspired Engineering at Harvard University, which was launched with a $125 million gift— which at the time was the largest philanthropic gift in Harvard's history—from Swiss billionaire Hansjörg Wyss. The Wyss Institute was founded to enable high-risk research and disruptive innovation, and to catalyze the field of biologically inspired engineering in which newly uncovered biological design principles are leveraged to develop new engineering innovations in the form of bioinspired materials and devices for medicine, industry, and the environment. The Institute is a partnership among Harvard University, its major affiliated hospitals (Beth Israel Deaconess Medical Center, Brigham and Women's Hospital, Boston Children's Hospital, Dana Farber Cancer Institute, Massachusetts General Hospital, Spaulding Rehabilitation Hospital), Boston University, Massachusetts Institute of Technology, Tufts University, University of Massachusetts Medical School, Charité - Universitätsmedizin Berlin, and University of Zurich.

Ingber is a member of the National Academy of Medicine, the National Academy of Inventors, the American Institute for Medical and Biological Engineering, and the American Academy of Arts and Sciences. He served as a member of the Space Studies Board of the U.S. National Research Council (NRC), which advises the National Academy of Sciences, National Academy of Engineering, and National Institute of Medicine, and he chaired its Committee on Space Biology and Medicine. He has been an external reviewer of multiple NRC reports, including “Plan for the International Space Station,” “Future Biotechnology Research on the International Space Station,” "Assessment of Directions in Microgravity and Physical Sciences Research at NASA", and “The Astrophysical Context of Life.”

Ingber also has served as a consultant to numerous companies in the pharmaceutical, biotechnology, and cosmetics industries, including Merck, Roche, Astrazeneca, Biogen, Chanel, and L’Oreal, among others. He currently chairs the Scientific Advisory Boards of Emulate, Inc. and Boa Biomedical, Inc.

He is an advisory board member for Integrative Biology.

== Awards ==
Ingber has received numerous awards and distinctions, including:

- 2021: Elected a member of the National Academy of Engineering for interdisciplinary contributions to mechanobiology and microsystems engineering, and leadership in biologically inspired engineering.
- 2018: Named to the Highly Cited Researchers List 2006–2016 by Clarivate Analytics.
- 2017: Founder's Award from the Biophysical Society.
- 2016: Elected to the American Academy of Arts and Sciences, and received the Shu Chien Award from the Biomedical Engineering Society, Pioneer Award from the University of Pittsburgh, and Max Tishler Lecture Award from Tufts University.
- 2015: Elected to the National Academy of Inventors, and won Product Design and Best Design of the Year Awards from London Design Museum for Organs-on-Chips, named Leading Global Thinker of 2015 by Foreign Policy Magazine.
- 2014: Delivered the Graeme Clark Oration in Melbourne, Australia to an audience of over 1,400.
- 2013: Received the NC3Rs 3Rs Prize from the UK's National Centre for the Replacement, Refinement and Reduction of Animals in Research (NC3Rs), and was named an honorary member of the Society of Toxicology for his work on Organs-on-Chips.
- 2012: Elected to the National Institute of Medicine (formerly Institute of Medicine) of the U.S. National Academies, one of the highest honors in the field of medicine in the United States, and won the World Technology Award in the biotechnology category.
- 2011: Inducted into the American Institute for Medical and Biological Engineering's College of Fellows and received the Holst Medal.
- 2010: Received the Lifetime Achievement Award from the Society for In Vitro Biology and the Rous-Whipple Award from the American Society for Investigative Pathology.
- 2009: Received the Pritzker Award from the Biomedical Engineering Society.
- 2009–2014: Received a Breast Cancer Innovator Award from the Department of Defense.
- 2005: Received the Talbot Medal in Theoretical and Applied Mechanics from University of Illinois Urbana-Champaign..
- 2002: Named to Esquire's list of the world's "Best and Brightest".
- 1991 to 1996: Recipient of an American Cancer Society Faculty Research Award.

Ingber has also been named to multiple Who's Who lists for his diverse contributions including: Science and Engineering (1991), America (1994), the World (1997), Medicine and Healthcare (1999), Business Leaders and Professionals—Honors Edition (2007), and was honored with the Albert Nelson Marquis Lifetime Achievement Award in 2018.

== Art and design exhibitions ==
Ingber collaborates internationally with artists, architects, and designers, as well as scientists, physicians, engineers, and the public. Examples of his involvement in the art/design community include:

- 2019: Guest curator of Bio-Futurism Exhibition and contributor to the Triennial Exhibition at Cooper-Hewitt Smithsonian Design Museum, New York; Organ Chips displayed at Barbican Centre London and Pompidou Centre Paris.
- 2018: Organ Chips displayed in Biodesign Exhibition at the Rhode Island School of Design, Providence, RI.
- 2017: Co-produced short film “The Beginning” to entertain and educate the public about molecular biology down to the atomic scale of precision.
- 2016: Cellular Tensegrity Models, Organ Chips, and Shrilk exhibited at the Martin Gropius-Bau Museum, Berlin; Organ Chips displayed at the Holon Design Museum, Israel and King Abdulaziz Center for World Culture, Saudi Arabia.
- 2015: Artificial biospleen prototype exhibited at the National Museum of Health and Medicine (NMHM); Organ Chips exhibited at the Museum of Modern Art (MoMA) in New York, displayed at Le Laboratoire Cambridge in Cambridge, Massachusetts, and named winner of the Design of the Year Award by the Design Museum in London; Shrilk displayed at the Booth Museum of Natural history in Brighton, UK.
- 2015: Human Organs-on-Chips exhibited at the Museum of Modern Art (MoMA) in New York; displayed at Le Laboratoire Cambridge in Cambridge, Massachusetts; and selected as a finalist by the Design Museum in London for the Design of the Year Award.
- 2011: Human Lung-on-a-Chip selected an INDEX Design for Life Award finalist and included in the INDEX: Award 2011 Exhibition in Copenhagen.
- 2010: Tensegrity multimedia exhibition displayed at Le Laboratoire in Paris; lecture presentation on tensegrity and nanobiotechnology at the Boston Museum of Science.
- 2005: Tensegrity multimedia exhibited at the "Image and Meaning" conference at the Getty Center in Los Angeles.
- 2002: Lecture presentation tensegrity and biological design at Boston Museum of Science.
- 2001: Lecture on tensegrity presented at the "Image and Meaning" conference at MIT in Cambridge, Massachusetts; Tensegrity multimedia presentation included in exhibition "On Growth and Form" at the Textile Museum of Canada in Toronto.
