= Ary L. Goldberger =

American scientist (born 1949)

Ary Louis Goldberger
- Born: May 5, 1949; Bronx, New York City
- Education: Harvard College, Yale Medical School
- Known for: PhysioNet
- Scientific career
- Workplaces: Harvard University, Beth Israel Deaconess Medical Center

Ary Louis Goldberger (b. Bronx, New York City, May 29, 1949) is a physician-educator, whose collaborative research work is at the interface of biomedicine and complexity science (nonlinear dynamics). He holds a BA from Harvard College and an MD from Yale Medical School. He did his clinical training in internal medicine and cardiovascular disease at Yale–New Haven Hospital and at the University of California, San Diego, respectively. He currently serves as Professor of Medicine at Harvard Medical School and was one of the Core Founding Faculty (2010–2015) of the Wyss Institute for Biologically Inspired Engineering at Harvard University.

== Research ==
Goldberger is the founding and current Principal Investigator (with R. G. Mark at MIT) of the NIH-sponsored Research Resource for Complex Physiologic Signals. The “Big Data” PhysioNet Resource is the first and remains the largest repository of free, open-access databases and open-source computational tools devoted to complex signals informatics. In addition, he is the founding and current Director of the Margret and H.A. Rey Institute for Nonlinear Dynamics in Physiology and Medicine at Beth Israel Deaconess Medical Center (BIDMC) in Boston.

== Publications ==
Goldberger is the senior author of two textbooks on clinical electrocardiography. He and his colleagues at BIDMC are developers of ECG Wave-Maven, the largest and most–widely used free teaching site for ECG self-assessment. He is also co-author of a recent book on critical thinking for students of medicine and their mentors.

== Honors ==
His scientific investigations focus on nonlinear mechanisms of healthy function and their alterations with pathology. He and his colleagues were the first to identify the fractal dynamics of the healthy heartbeat and describe alterations in fractal scaling with life-threatening conditions such as heart failure. Goldberger and colleagues originated and continue to elaborate the complexity-loss theory of aging and disease which is widely cited in basic science and clinical research.

Some of this work was featured on the 2011 PBS-NOVA show: Hunting the Hidden Dimension. Among other honors, he is a recipient of the S. Robert Stone Award for Excellence in Teaching at Harvard Medical School/BIDMC and an Ellison Medical Foundation Senior Scholar in Aging Award.

Goldberger and colleagues, R.G Mark and G.B. Moody, are recipients of the 2016 Laufman-Greatbatch Award from the Association for the Advancement of Medical Instrumentation (AAMI). This honor, the highest conferred by the AAMI Foundation, recognizes work over the last 20 years to collect and provide open access to “big data” and software tools through the creation of the PhysioNet Resource.

== Bibliography ==
- Goldberger's Clinical Electrocardiography: A Simplified Approach ISBN 978-0323824750
