= Institute for Bioengineering of Catalonia =

Research institute in Catalonia, Spain

Institute for Bioengineering of Catalonia (IBEC)
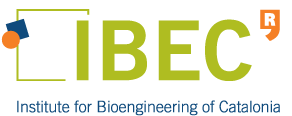
- Founded: 2005
- Founder: Government of Catalonia, University of Barcelona, Technical University of Catalonia
- Purpose: Bioengineering and nanomedicine research
- Location: Baldiri Reixac, 10-12, Barcelona, Catalonia, Spain
- Key people: Josep Samitier (Director)
- Website: www.ibecbarcelona.eu

The Institute for Bioengineering of Catalonia (IBEC) is an institution engaged in basic and applied research in bioengineering and nanomedicine, with experts working on tissue regeneration, biomechanics, molecular dynamics, biomimetics, drug delivery, organs ‘on-a-chip’, cell migration, stem cells, artificial olfaction and microbial biotechnology. The institute was created by the Government of Catalonia, the University of Barcelona and the Polytechnic University of Catalonia in December 2005 and is located at the Barcelona Science Park (Parc Científic de Barcelona – PCB). The director of the institute is Prof. Josep Samitier, who took over from founding director Josep A. Planell i Estany in 2013. In 2014 IBEC was named a "Severo Ochoa Centre of Excellence" by the Spanish Ministry of Economy and Competitiveness.

== Mission ==
The institute aims to pursue interdisciplinary research in bioengineering and nanomedicine which is combined with specific transfer targets to produce new applied technologies in the health sciences. It fosters collaborations with local organisations and international research institutes, provides high-level training to staff and students, promotes innovation and technology transfer, and engages the public through outreach and educational activities. IBEC's ultimate objective is to translate research results to the clinic to improve health and quality of life.

== Location ==
Most administrative and scientific divisions of IBEC Barcelona are located at the Barcelona Science Park (Parc Científic de Barcelona – PCB). The Park also hosts the research centers of several biotech and pharmaceutical companies, as well as technical services and technology platforms. The institute also has two groups located at the Hospital Universitari de Bellvitge (Bellvitge University Hospital – HUB). Some of the institute's group leaders are also affiliated to the University of Barcelona or the Polytechnic University of Catalonia.

== Organisation ==
=== Research Areas ===
The scientific and technological research at the institute is grouped into three core application areas: Bioengineering for Regenerative Therapies, Bioengineering for Future Medicine and Bioengineering for Active Ageing.

- Bioengineering for Regenerative Therapies: Molecular dynamics at the interface of cells and biomaterials; the biophysical mechanisms underlying migration at the level of cells and tissues; biomimetic systems for cell-based assays; endogenous tissue programs for organ regeneration; developmental neurobiology and regeneration; and biomaterials for regenerative therapies.
- Bioengineering for Future Medicine: Nanotechnology for new biomedical systems and devices; nanoscopy for nanomedicine; nanoscale tools to study biological systems, including optopharmacology; nanomedicine-based systems for malaria; cellular and molecular mechanobiology; label-free biological characterization methods and electronic biosensors; micro- and nanorobots.
- Bioengineering for Active Ageing: Developmental neurobiology and regeneration; biomaterials for regenerative therapies; signal and information processing for sensing systems; antimicrobial therapies; and biomedical signal processing and interpretation.

=== Research Groups ===
There are 23 individual research groups within IBEC, investigating a range of topics falling into one or more of the above research areas. Principal investigators or group leaders are listed in italics:

- Nanoscopy for nanomedicine Dr. Lorenzo Albertazzi
- Molecular Bionics Prof. Giuseppe Battaglia
- Protein phase transitions in health and disease Dr. Benedetta Bolognesi
- Sythetic Morphogenisis Dr. Vito Conte
- Biomaterials for regenerative therapies Dr. Elisabeth Engel
- Nanomalaria Dr. Xavier Fernàndez-Busquets
- Nanoscale bioelectrical characterization Dr. Gabriel Gomila
- Nanoprobes and nanoswitches Prof. Pau Gorostiza
- Biomedical signal processing and interpretation Prof. Raimon Jané Campos
- Molecular imaging for precision medicine group Dr. Irene Marco-Rius
- Signal and information processing for sensing systems Dr. Santiago Marco
- Biomimetic systems for cell engineering group Dr. Elena Martínez Fraiz
- Pluripotency for organ regeneration group Dr. Elena Garreta
- Targeted therapeutics and nanodevices group Prof. Silvia Muro
- Cellular and respiratory biomechanics group Prof. Daniel Navajas
- Biosensors for bioengineering Dr. Javier Ramón Azcón
- Molecular and cellular neurobiotechnology José Antonio Del Río Fernández
- Cellular and molecular mechanobiology Dr. Pere Roca Cusachs
- Nanobioengineering Prof. Josep Samitier
- Smart nano-bio-devices Prof. Samuel Sánchez Ordóñez
- Bacterial infections: antimicrobial therapies Dr. Eduart Torrents
- Integrative cell and tissue dynamics Prof. Xavier Trepat

=== Core Facilities and Services ===
IBEC manages a Nanotechnology Platform which offers services in nanofabrication, nanomanipulation and nanocharacterization to its own scientists and to academic and industrial researchers from outside. The platform has 150m^{2} of class 10,000 cleanroom space and laboratories offering equipment for the fabrication and characterization of micro- and nanodevices and structures. In 2015 IBEC became the first institution in the south of Europe to acquire a 3D bioprinter that is suitable for industrial manufacture according to GMP guidelines.

=== Governance ===
==== Board of trustees ====
IBEC's board of trustees is composed of members of the founding institutions. It is responsible for overseeing research activities and the institutional strategy, approving the operating funds and ensuring that annual goals are met. Its president is the Minister for Health of the Government of Catalonia.

==== International Scientific Committee (ISC) ====
An International Scientific Committee (ISC) composed of scientists from the fields covered by IBEC's research plays a key role in providing strategic guidance and assessing the research directions taken.

The current ISC is made up of the following members: Samuel I. Stupp (president), Northwestern University, Chicago; Carljin Bouten, Eindhoven University of Technology, Netherlands; Sergio Cerutti, Polytechnic University of Milan, Italy; Lim Chwee Teck, National University of Singapore; Roger Kamm, MIT; Luis de Lecea, Stanford University; Krishna Persaud, University of Manchester; Bernat Soria, Centro Andaluz de Biología Molecular (CABIMER), Seville; Molly Stevens, Institute of Biomedical Engineering, Imperial College London; Fiona M. Watt, EMBL Heidelberg, Germany; Heiko Zimmermann, Fraunhofer Institute for Biomedical Engineering, Germany

== Funding sources ==
IBEC receives most of its core funding from the Government of Catalonia through the Department of Health and the Department of Economy and Knowledge.

Further funds are provided through competitive grants obtained from the European Union under FP7 Horizon 2020 and the Spanish Ministry of Economy and Competitiveness, among others.

IBEC's researchers also receive financial support from the University of Barcelona or the Polytechnic University of Catalonia, the Catalan Institution for Research and Advanced Studies (ICREA), AXA and several other sources.
