= Wyss Institute for Biologically Inspired Engineering =

Non-profit biomedical research institute

Coordinates: 42.38122°N 71.11626°W

- Motto: Breakthrough discoveries cannot change the world if they do not leave the lab
- Parent institution: Harvard University
- Founder: Hansjörg Wyss
- Established: 2009; 17 years ago
- Mission: Transform healthcare, industry, and the environment by emulating the way nature builds.
- Focus: Bioengineering, Bionics
- Head: Donald E. Ingber
- Location: Boston, Massachusetts, U.S.
- Website: wyss.harvard.edu

The Wyss Institute for Biologically Inspired Engineering (pronounced /viːs/ "veese") is a cross-disciplinary research institute at Harvard University focused on bridging the gap between academia and industry (translational medicine) by drawing inspiration from nature's design principles to solve challenges in health care and the environment. It is focused on the field of biologically inspired engineering to be distinct from bioengineering and biomedical engineering. The institute also has a focus on applications, intellectual property generation, and commercialization.

The Wyss Institute is located in Boston's Longwood Medical Area and has 375 full-time staff. The Wyss is organized around eight focus areas, each of which integrate faculty, postdocs, fellows, and staff scientists. The focus areas are bioinspired therapeutics & diagnostics, diagnostics accelerator, immuno-materials, living cellular devices, molecular robotics, 3D organ engineering, predictive bioanalytics and synthetic biology.

== History ==
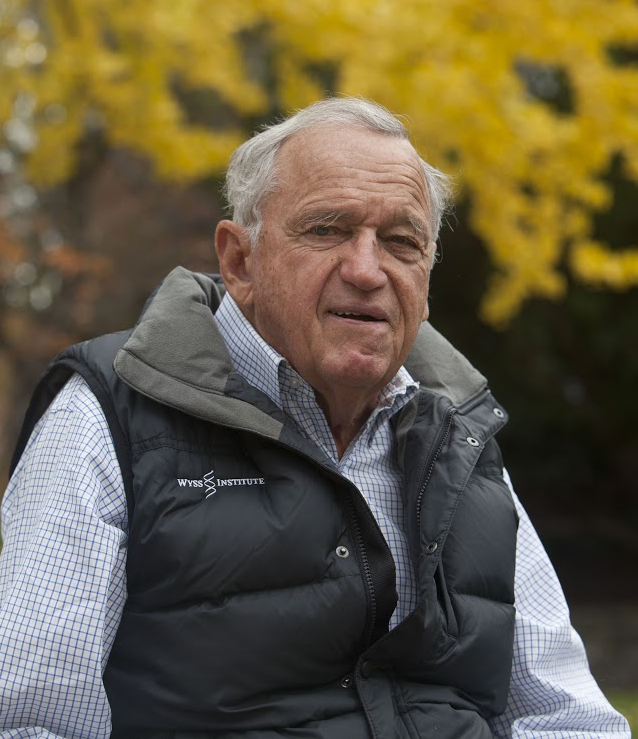
Hansjörg Wyss, benefactor of the Wyss Institute

In 2005, Harvard University established a faculty working group to envision the future of bioengineering. The group was called the Harvard Institute for Biologically Inspired Engineering (HIBIE), with the committee focused on synthetic biology, living materials, and biological control. HIBIE was co-chaired by Harvard professors Donald E. Ingber and David J. Mooney. In January 2009, institute was reformed into the Wyss Institute upon receiving a $125 million gift from Hansjörg Wyss. Ingber became the founding director of the Wyss Institute and David Mooney became a founding Core Faculty member, along with Professors Joanna Aizenberg, David A. Edwards, Kit Parker, George M. Whitesides, George Church, Ary Goldberger, William Shih, Robert Wood, James J. Collins, L. Mahadevan, Radhika Nagpal, and Pamela Silver.

In 2013, Hansjörg Wyss gave another $125 million to Harvard University, doubling his initial gift. The funding was used to further the institute's interdisciplinary research, which includes DNA engineering, cleaning toxins from blood, vibrating insoles to help older adults maintain balance, and a melanoma cancer vaccine. In 2019, Hansjörg Wyss donated a third gift of $131 million to the Wyss Institute. In 2020, the Wyss Institute and Northpond Ventures, a Maryland-based venture capital firm, created the Laboratory for Bioengineering Research and Innovation at the Wyss Institute. The $12 million funding supports research related to RNA therapies, genome engineering, and new drug delivery methods.

Within its first ten years, the institute also spun out 29 startup companies to commercialize Wyss Institute developments.

== Scientific developments ==
The institute was originally founded with fourteen faculty from Harvard University. The institute had around 40 scientists and engineers as a part of the Advanced Technology Team organized around six technology platforms and two cross-platform initiatives across the fields of adaptive material technologies, bioinspired soft robotics, biomimetic microsystems, immuno-materials, living cellular devices, molecular robotics, synthetic biology, and 3D organ engineering. The Wyss Institute has been responsible for a number of scientific developments and spinoffs.

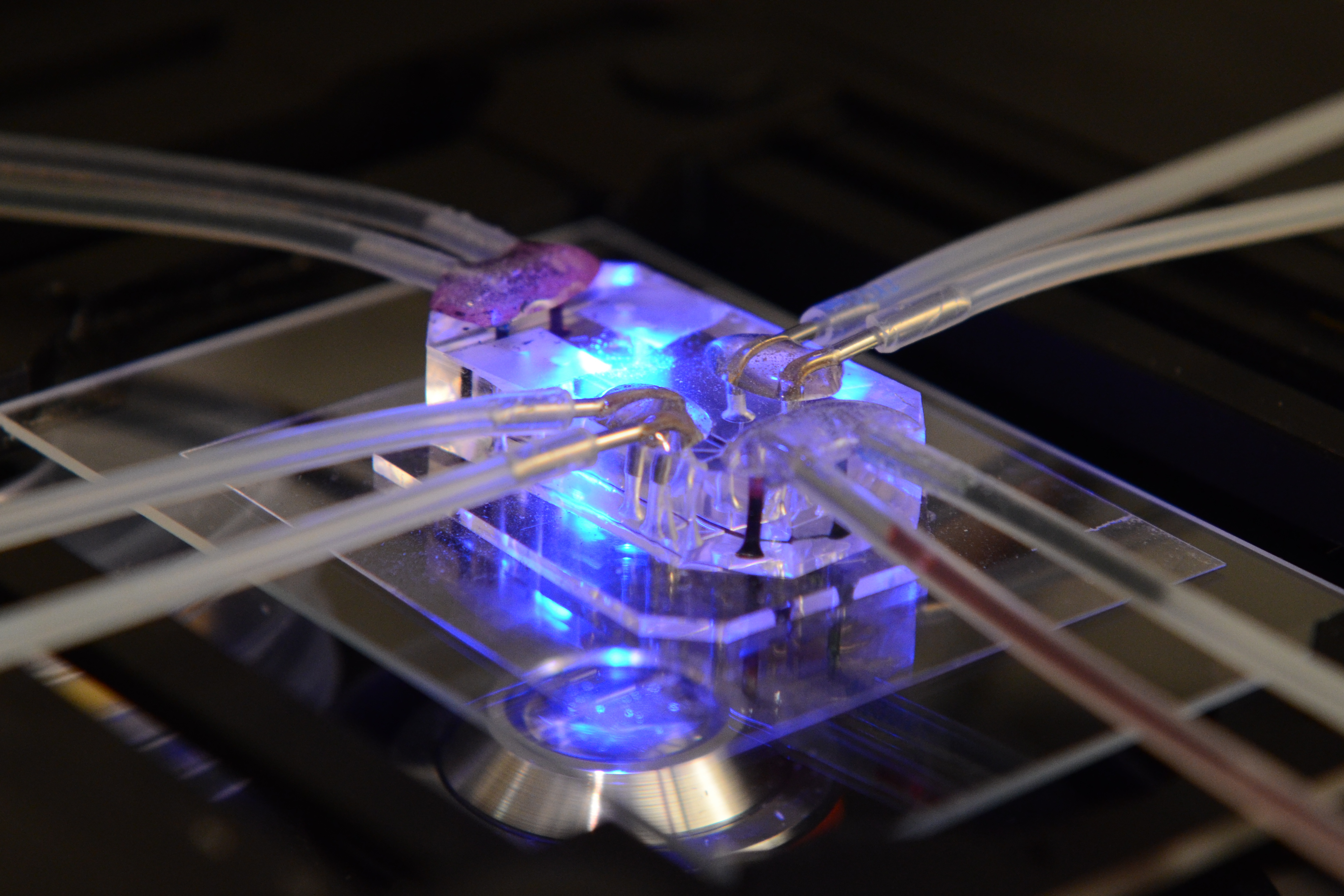
Lung-on-a-Chip, as developed by the Wyss Institute

- In 2010, Donald Ingber pioneered the first 3D organ-on-a-chip that mimics a human lung. Following the lung-on-a-chip, the team built a kidney-on-a-chip and an intestine-on-a-chip. In 2014, Emulate spun out to make organ chips commercially available for other scientists to use for disease modeling and drug testing, including those at Johnson & Johnson, Merck, Takeda, Roche, and Cedars-Sinai Medical Center.
- In 2013, Conor Walsh developed a soft exosuit that uses textiles and cables to replicate leg muscles, which can help a healthy wearer not fatigue as quickly and help people with physical disabilities restore their muscles and increase mobility. In 2016, ReWalk robotics licensed the exosuit technology for the treatment of stroke, Multiple Sclerosis (MS), and mobility limitations. In 2019, ReWalk received clearance from the FDA to sell their ReStore soft exosuit for rehabilitation of stroke survivors.

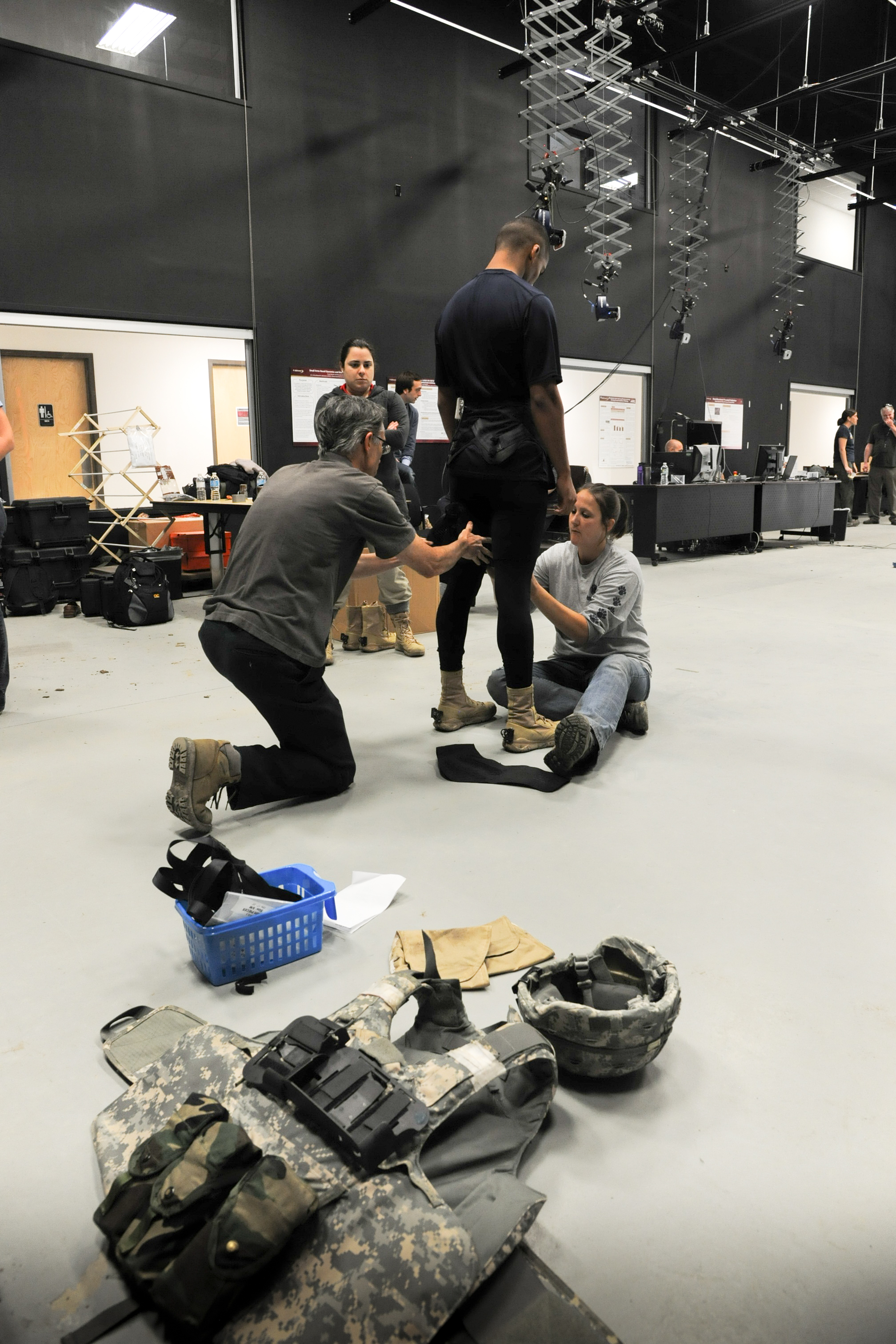
U.S. Army evaluates DARPA's futuristic soft exosuit, originated at the Wyss Institute

- In 2013, David Mooney and the Dana-Farber Cancer Institute began a Phase I clinical trial for an implantable cancer vaccine. In 2018, Swiss pharmaceutical company Novartis licensed the technology. Mooney also developed injectable versions of their cancer vaccine.
- In 2014, Jennifer A. Lewis developed inks and a process to 3D bioprint organs that could be suitable for human transplants. In 2022, Trestle Biotherapeutics licensed technology to develop 3D bioprinted kidney tissue from Harvard University.
- In 2014, James J. Collins and MIT developed an inexpensive diagnostic that consists of cellular "machinery" (proteins, nucleic acids and ribosomes) freeze-dried on paper. The team tested their diagnostic with Ebola virus and in 2016 they tested it with the Zika virus. In 2021, the technology was licensed to Sherlock Biosciences.
- In 2015, Donald Ingber engineered a blood protein that binds to more than 90 sepsis-causing pathogens, including bacteria, fungi, viruses, and parasites. The technology was licensed by BOA Biomedical and approved in 2021 by the FDA to conduct human clinical trials.
- In 2015, Conor Walsh developed a soft robotic grip glove to restore mobility for people with impaired hand function. In 2021, Imago Rehab spun out to develop the soft robotic glove for stroke rehabilitation.
- In 2017 David J. Mooney, inspired by the sticky properties of Arion subfuscus slug secretions, developed a non-toxic hydrogel adhesive that sticks to wet surfaces and stretches, making it ideal for use within the body.
- In 2019, George Church published research on combination gene therapy to treat multiple age-related diseases in mice, including diabetes, heart disease and kidney disease. The team founded Rejuvenate Bio to further develop the technology to treat age-related diseases in dogs.
- In 2019, George Church's lab developed a machine-learning approach to make more efficient adeno-associated viruses (AAVs), which are delivery vehicles for gene therapies. This team spun out Dyno Therapeutics to continue developing enhanced AAVs. Dyno Therapeutics has partnerships with pharmaceutical companies Novartis, Sarepta Therapeutics, and Roche. In 2021, Dyno Therapeutics raised a $100 million Series A.
- In 2020, Michael Levin and Josh Bongard developed new synthetic lifeform called Xenobots made from skin cells and heart muscle cells from the African clawed frog (Xenopus laevis). The scientists use an AI program to design the Xenobots to carry out desired functions, learning how cells cooperate to build complex bodies during morphogenesis and about regenerative medicine more broadly.
- In 2021, Jennifer A. Lewis and Massachusetts Eye and Ear hospital developed PhonoGraft, a 3D-printed regenerative eardrum graft. The team launched a startup company that was acquired by Desktop Health, a subsidiary of Desktop Metal.
- In 2021, Pamela Silver engineered bacteria to feed off of greenhouse gasses to then produce fats similar to animal and vegetable fats, as well as polymers similar to those made from petrochemicals.

=== Response to COVID ===
During the COVID-19 pandemic, the Wyss Institute was engaged in several notable efforts. This included the development of a diagnostic face mask that can detect SARS-CoV-2 RNA in the wearer's breath, and the application of the eRapid technology to detect the nucleic acids of the genome of SARS-CoV-2. The technology would be licensed by Antisoma Therapeutics as a point-of-care diagnostic test for COVID-19. The identification of undocumented nucleic acid contamination during routine experiments, which inadvertently caused false positives for COVID-19, led to the development of new safety protocols to protect researchers and ensure data integrity. New nasal swabs that could be manufactured quickly and more easily which launched the startup Rhinostics. Use of computational approaches and organ-chips to repurpose FDA-approved drugs like Amodiaquine to prevent or treat COVID-19.

== See also ==
- Bioinspiration
- Wyss Center for Bio and Neuroengineering in Switzerland
