= Catalan Institution for Research and Advanced Studies =

Spanish research foundation

ICREA, Catalan Institution for Research and Advanced Studies, is a foundation jointly promoted by the Catalan Government through its Department of Innovation, Universities and Enterprise, and the Catalan Foundation for Research and Innovation (FCRI). ICREA was created in 2000 aiming to boost the research system of Catalonia via the recruitment of top scientists for the Catalan R&D system, scientists capable of leading new research groups, strengthening existing groups, and opening up novel forefront lines of research.

To achieve its objectives ICREA works closely with Catalan universities and research centres based in Catalonia by means of long-term agreements that allow ICREA researchers to integrate in research groups within these universities and centres.

In the period 2000–2008, ICREA has hired a total of 222 tenured research professors in different areas of research: 32.5% in life and medical sciences, 27% in experimental sciences and mathematics, 10% in social sciences, 13.5% in different fields of humanities and 17% in technology.
