= Robert A. Pritzker Distinguished Lecture Award =

Annual award for biomedical engineering

- Description: Premier honor conferred by the Biomedical Engineering Society recognizing biomedical engineering achievement
- Country: United States
- Presented by: Biomedical Engineering Society

The Robert A. Pritzker Distinguished Lecture Award is the premier honor conferred by the Biomedical Engineering Society and recognizes biomedical engineering achievement. The award started as the BMES Distinguished Lecture Award in 1991 and was sponsored by the Whitaker Foundation. The award was renamed in tribute to Robert Pritzker starting in 2007.

== Recipients ==
- 1991 - Thomas Harris - Vanderbilt University
- 1992 - Pierre Galletti - Brown University
- 1993 - J. David Hellums - Rice University
- 1994 - Robert S. Langer - Massachusetts Institute of Technology
- 1995 - Rakesh K. Jain - Harvard Medical School
- 1996 - Marcos Intaglietta - University of California
- 1997 - Sheldon Weinbaum - The City College of New York
- 1998 - Jen-Shih Lee - University of Virginia
- 1999 - John H. Linehan - Whitaker Foundation
- 2000 - Murray B. Sachs - Johns Hopkins University
- 2001 - Yoram Rudy - Case Western Reserve University
- 2002 - Gerald Pollak - University of Washington
- 2003 - Douglas A. Lauffenburger - Massachusetts Institute of Technology
- 2004 - W. Mark Saltzman- Yale University
- 2005 - Peter G. Katona - Massachusetts Institute of Technology
- 2006 - Daniel Hammer - University of Pennsylvania
- 2007 - Antonios Mikos - Rice University
- 2008 - Buddy Ratner - University of Washington
- 2009 - Donald E. Ingber - Harvard University
- 2010 - Rebecca Richards-Kortum - Rice University
- 2011 - Michael Shuler - Cornell University
- 2012 - Ajit P. Yoganathan, PhD – Georgia Institute of Technology
- 2013 - Ashutosh Chilkoti, PhD - Duke University
- 2014 - James J. Collins, PhD - Boston University
- 2015 - Martin Yarmush, MD, PhD - Rutgers University
- 2016 - Nicholas A. Peppas, ScD - University of Texas at Austin
- 2017 - Gordana Vunjak-Novakovic, PhD - Columbia University
- 2018 - Rashid Bashir, PhD - University of Illinois at Urbana-Champaign
- 2019 - Christopher Chen, MD, PhD - Boston University
- 2020 - Paul Hunter Peckham, PhD - Case Western Reserve University
- 2021 - Nancy Allbritton, MD, PhD - University of Washington
- 2022 - Cato T. Laurencin, MD, PhD - University of Connecticut
- 2023 - Tejal A. Desai, PhD - Brown University
- 2024 - Kyriacos A. Athanasiou, PhD - UCI Samueli School of Engineering
- 2025 - Linda Griffith, PhD - MIT Department of Biological Engineering
- 2026 - William Wagner, PhD - University of Pittsburgh

== See also ==
- List of engineering awards
