= Edward Wilson Merrill =

American biomaterials scientist (1923–2020)

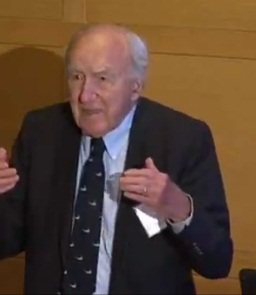
- Edward Wilson Merrill
- Born: August 31, 1923; New Bedford, Massachusetts, U.S.
- Died: August 6, 2020 (aged 96); Belmont, Massachusetts, U.S.
- Known for: Biomaterials, Artificial Kidney, Blood Rheology
- Awards: Institute of Medicine of the National Academies (2014), National Academy of Engineering (2013), American Academy of Arts and Sciences (1966), Pierre Galletti Award (AIMBE, 2010), 100 Chemical Engineers of the Modern Era (AIChE, 2008), Founders Award (AIChE, 2000), Founders Award (SFB, 2002), Alpha Chi Sigma Award for Research Contributions (AIChE, 1982), C.A. Stine Materials and Engineering Award (AIChE, 1993), Clemson Award for Contributions to the Biomaterials Literature, (SFB, 1990)
- Scientific career
- Fields: Chemical Engineering, Biomedical Engineering, Biomaterials, Biocompatibility, Blood Rheology, Artificial kidney, Hydrogels
- Workplaces: Massachusetts Institute of Technology
- Doctoral advisor: Hermann P. Meissner (1907-1990)

Edward Wilson Merrill (August 31, 1923 – August 6, 2020) was an American biomaterials scientist. He was one of the founders of bioengineering, and specifically the biomedical engineering field it developed from chemical engineering. Merrill was born to Edward Clifton Merrill (1881–1949), a chemical engineer and chief chemist of the United Drug Company (Rexall) and Gertrude Wilson (1895–1987).

== Education and work ==
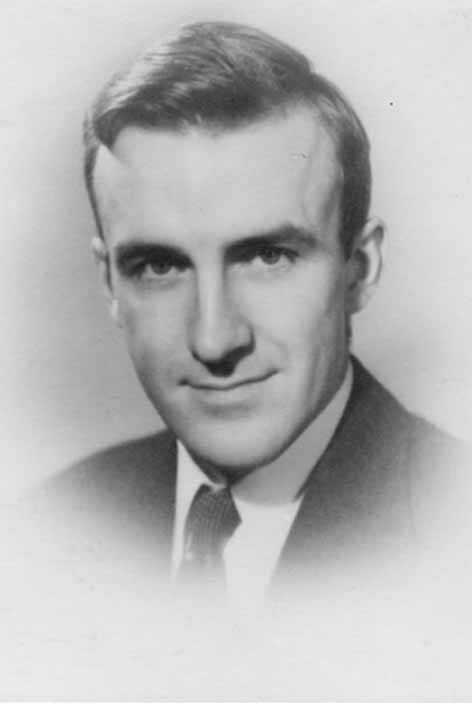
Edward Merrill in 1950

Merrill grew up in Boston and attended the Roxbury Latin High school. He studied classics at Harvard. As Herman P. Meissner notes in his article "In appreciation",

"Edward W. Merrill entered Harvard in 1941 to study the classics with emphasis on the contributions from the Greek authors. The faculty was delighted with his brilliant performance and recognized that they had a real scholar in the making. Merrill however felt that there were further aspects to life and reality than the humanities. He had always been interested in science, and so chose chemistry as a minor. At the time, Professor William H. McAdams of M.I.T. visited Harvard several days each week to present a rigorous and intensive course in chemical engineering basics. Ed Merrill enrolled, contrary to the advice of the more sophisticated undergrads, whose gentlest description of the subject was "formidable".

He received a B.A. in chemistry from Harvard University in 1944 and pursued doctoral studies at the Massachusetts Institute of Technology under the direction of Herman P. Meissner A leading chemical engineer of the 20th century, Meissner (doctorate 1938) had been educated under Hans Joachim Schumacher (1904-1990), at the University of Frankfurt. Schumacher himself was a doctoral student of the legendary Max Bodenstein (1871-1942), and in fact, there is a rich history of connections in the Merrill/Meissner/Schumacher academic tree going back to the early French and German chemists of the 18th and 19th century.

Merrill received his PhD in 1947 working on theories of adhesion of two polymers (thesis on "Certain Cohesive and Adhesive Characteristics of Thermoplastic High Polymers". His work anticipated much later work of Pierre-Gilles de Gennes and others on polymer interdigitation to improve adhesion. Upon graduation he was employed by Dewey and Almy (later part of W.R. Grace) and joined MIT as an assistant professor of chemical engineering in 1950. He went through the ranks and was appointed Carbon P. Dubbs Distinguished Professor of Chemical Engineering in 1973, a position he held until 1998. Since then, he has been professor emeritus of chemical engineering. He served also as chief scientist and consultant in biochemical engineering to Harvard University Health Services, 1984–98. He was a visiting lecturer in chemistry at Harvard University from 1952 to 1958, a consultant at the Peter Bent Brigham Hospital of Boston from 1960 to 1972, a consultant of the Children's Hospital in Boston from 1969 to 1972, and consultant of the Beth Israel Hospital in Boston from 1969 to 1985.

== Research ==
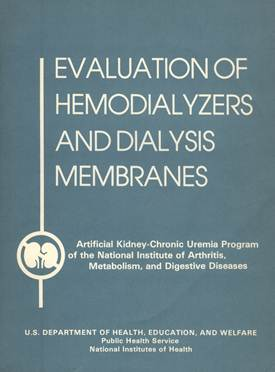
Cover page of the first NIH guidelines for artificial kidneys in the 1960s

Over a 66-year career Merrill has been a pioneer in several fields of bioengineering. In the 1950s and 60s he was the leading scientist in blood rheology. In the 1960s and 1970s Merrill was a pioneer in the development of the artificial kidney, analysis of its transport characteristics and optimization of hemodialyzer membranes. In the 1960s-80s he pioneered the study of protein-polymer interactions under stagnant and flow conditions and made exceptional contributions in the development of hydrogels as biomaterials, and in ionic or covalent heparinization techniques on polymer surfaces for antithrombogenic materials. Ed Merrill and Ed Saltzman of Harvard were the pioneers who proposed poly(ethylene oxide) as a highly biocompatible biomaterial in a seminal paper and did significant studies to analyze its structure and blood response. In the 1990s Ed Merrill and W. Harris developed irradiation crosslinked high-density polyethylene (HDPE) that has become the main material for total joint replacement.

Merrill's ideas on poly(ethylene oxide) (PEO) as a non-thrombogenic biomaterial (1979 with Saltzman) led to an explosion in the use of PEG- and PEO- decorated biomedical systems. Merrill's work on highly crosslinked polyethylene (1990s with W. Harris) led to the new HDPE materials now used in artificial joints (a $4 billion industry). Merrill's pioneering work on artificial kidneys (with Colton and Britton in the 1960s) led to the development of the first NIH guidelines for artificial kidneys in the 1960s.

== Major research and educational contributions ==
Ed Merrill's scientific contributions can be classified in five categories:

1. Merrill developed the patented GDM [Gilinson-Dauwalter-Merrill] viscometer and investigated the effect of the hematocrit various plasma proteins, and white blood cells on blood viscosity and flow behavior.
2. He developed new heparinized biomedical surfaces based on poly (vinyl alcohol) and hydroxylated SBS-block copolymer systems (with P. Wong)
3. With P. Farrell, and C.K. Colton, he developed novel hemodialysis membranes based on Cuprophane.
4. He is the inventor (1973) of pioneering silicone-based contact lenses that became the basis of the oxygen-permeable technology of modern contact lenses.
5. With W. Harris of MGH, he developed advanced methods of irradiation-crosslinked high-density polyethylenes that have become the standard materials in joint replacement.

Merrill is a legendary figure in the 20th century education of chemical engineers, bioengineers, polymer scientists and biomaterials scientists. An article in 1984 gives a vivid depiction of the scientist and educator,

"Ed Merrill is truly a Renaissance man in the best sense of the phrase, with broad interests and the ability to inject ideas from one discipline into another, often with spectacular results. His former students recall literary references which were artfully entwined with a particular concept in chemical engineering or polymer chemistry which he was trying to convey. Two particular favorites were Sir Arthur Conan Doyle and Lewis Carroll. Early in his career, grateful students presented him with an authentic Sherlock Holmes style hat which was a famous trademark of his many years thereafter. That hat, his Holmesian pipe, and his tall lean appearance must have startled more than one MIT student. An impressionable undergraduate might well have thought that the famous detective was alive and well and now devoting his talents to unraveling scientific mysteries, and such a deduction would not have been far from the truth. The Cheshire Cat figured prominently in at least one of his lectures on polymer chemistry. The excluded volume of a polymer in solution is a theoretical concept much like the second virial coefficient of gases. Because of competing forces, it can vanish at a particular point called the theta temperature. Rather than presenting such information solely in a dry scientific manner, however, Ed likened it to the body of Carroll's famous cat, which would on occasion disappear, leaving only the grin (the actual volume of the polymer chain)."

A series of rare photographs from his work at MIT during the 1950-1970 period can be found in the MIT Museum Collections.

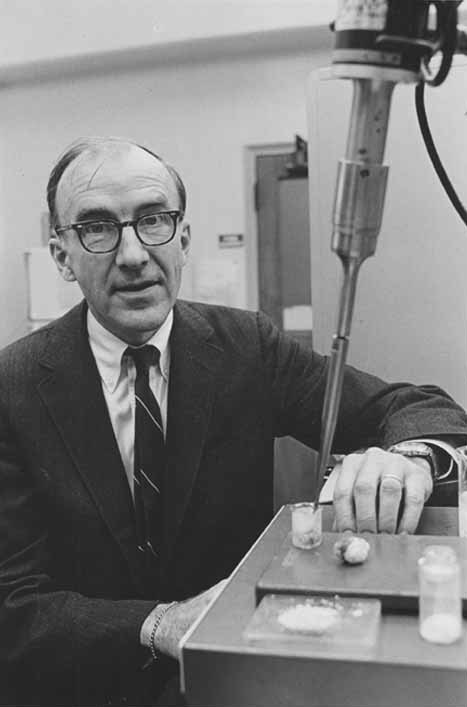
Edward Merrill in the late 1960s

Ed Merrill is also a pioneer in biomedical education and in the development of courses for biomedical engineering. His course 10.56 "Chemical Engineering in Medicine and Biology" was first taught at MIT's Chemical Engineering Department in January 1963. He has educated several generations of current leaders of biomedical engineering and polymer science.

But the most poignant description of the special environment when Ed Merrill was teaching is summarized by a former student, a distinguished member of all three US academies, who said in a 2010 seminar:

"...It won't surprise anyone to hear me say that Ed Merrill is without question the most influential teacher I 've ever had. I am a polymer chemist because Ed is a polymer chemist, I work on biological problems because Ed works on biological problems, and I teach the way I do because Ed teaches the way he does. I've said many times that had I encountered Ed as a teacher of something else, I would now be doing something else... Ed offered an IAP * course on polymers in January 1972 and I became a polymer chemist just about half way through his first lecture...Ed did many things at that time that were important to me and have remained important to me over the years. His classes were lively and his sense of humor and his flair for the theatrical were always on display. He would do demonstrations in which the simple pouring of one liquid into another became an adventure. I don't think we were ever in danger but it always seemed as though something might go horribly wrong. He brought Paul Flory and Paul Rempp to MIT at that time and he gave us opportunities to know them inside and outside the classroom. He made me feel as if what I was doing in the lab was important despite the fact that I was mostly breaking stuff and spending his money. And he made me part of a family...For all of those things I am very grateful."

* IAP is a special MIT program, Independent Activity Period, which allows professors and others to teach a short course for four weeks, a course on a subject they feel very familiar with, even if it is not their main research interest.

Academic family tree of Edward Wilson Merrill as prepared in 2003 by Dr. Lisa Brannon-Peppas

In 1983, his 60th birthday was celebrated with an appropriate volume and his first academic family tree was drawn. In 1993, his 70th birthday was celebrated with an appropriate symposium and his academic tree was redrawn. In 2010, on the occasion of a special MIT event celebrating 60 years of research, he was awarded his academic family tree with all his PhD-related students and descendants. His first MS student was Bayard Storey (MS '55) who went on to study medicine and is now Professor Emeritus of Gynecology at the University of Pennsylvania. His first PhD student was the legendary Allan Hoffman (PhD '57) who is now Professor of Bioengineering at the University of Washington in Seattle. His "academic tree" includes now about 3,600 scientists and engineers with PhD degrees or postdocs associated with him directly or through his academic descendants. This list includes approximately 675 professors around the world!

Merrill himself supervised 57 PhD students, 62 MS students and 12 postdoctoral fellows. Of the 57 PhDs, 17 became faculty members and 21 became CEOs, CFOs, CTOs, or VPs of companies.

At the Centennial AIChE meeting (2008) seven of his academic descendants joined him in the list of "100 Eminent Chemical Engineers of the Modern Era". Two from the first generation (Clark Colton, Nicholas A. Peppas), two from the second (Robert Langer, Buddy Ratner), and three from the third generation (Kristi Anseth, David Edwards and Cato Laurencin). Also five of the nine recipients of the Pierre Galletti Award of AIMBE, the highest bioengineering recognition in the country, are in his academic tree. In total, his academic descendants have received 39 AIChE awards.

An impressive number of descendants of this academic tree are members of the major Academies. They include:

- Twenty one NAE members (Allan Hoffman, Nicholas A. Peppas, David A. Tirrell, Robert Langer, Tony Mikos, Elazer Edelman, David Edwards, Cato Laurencin, Linda Griffith, Yosi Kost, Howard Rosen, Gordana Vunjak-Novakovic, Kristi Anseth, Richard Korsmeyer, David Mooney, Kam W. Leong, Buddy Ratner, Peter Farrell, Howard Bernstein, John Klier, Samir Mitragotri).
- Thirteen IOM members (Nicholas A. Peppas, David A. Tirrell, Robert Langer, Elazer Edelman, Cato Laurencin, Tony Mikos, Kristi Anseth, Marsha Moses, David Mooney, Gordana Vunjak-Novakovic, Mark Saltzman, Elliot Chaikof, Mike Sefton),
- Three NAS members (Robert Langer, David A. Tirrell, Kristi Anseth)
- One member of the Royal Society (Mike Sefton)

Ed Merrill, along with Paul Rempp, is coauthor of the 1992 classic Polymer Synthesis. He is the author of 350 publications and about 70 patents, the most recent of which was issued as "Radiation and Melt Treated Ultra High Molecular Weight Polyethylene Prosthetic Devices."

== Awards and honors ==
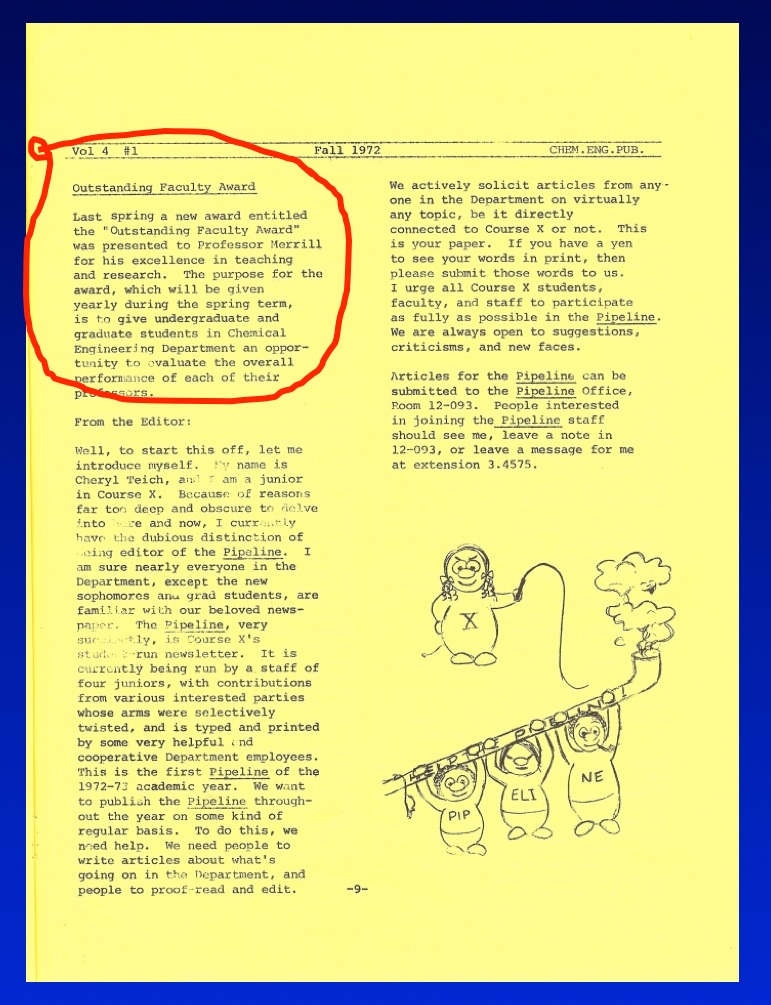
Announcement declaring Edward Wilson Merrill as the recipient of the Outstanding Faculty Award at MIT in Fall 1972

Edward Merrill has been elected a member of the National Academy of Engineering, the Institute of Medicine of the National Academies and the American Academy of Arts and Sciences. The American Institute of Chemical Engineers has bestowed upon him the Founders Award (2000), the Alpha Chi Sigma Award for Research Contributions (1982) and the C.M.A. Stine Materials Science and Engineering Award (1993). In 2008 and on the occasion of the Centennial of AIChE, Merrill was named one of the "100 Eminent Chemical Engineers of the Modern Era".

The Society for Biomaterials (SFB) bestowed upon him the Founders Award (2002) and the Clemson Award for Contributions to the Biomaterials Literature (1990).

The American Institute of Medical and Biological Engineering (AIMBE) awarded him the 2010 Pierre Galetti Award, the highest recognition in the bioengineering field.

Ed Merrill has been the recipient of numerous teaching and mentorship awards. He received the M.I.T. Department of Chemical Engineering Outstanding Faculty Award (teaching and research) in 1972, 1989 and 1992.

Merrill served in the Museum of Fine Arts, Boston as Consultant to the Conservator, Department of Prints, Drawings, and Photographs, 1988-. He has also served as Vice President of the Boston-Strasbourg Sister City Association, Director of the Alliance Francaise of Boston-Cambridge, and Honorary Trustee of the Buckingham Browne and Nicholas School.
