= Debra Auguste =

American chemical engineer

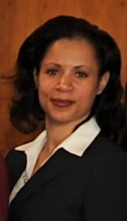
- Auguste upon receiving the PECASE for 2012
- Education: Massachusetts Institute of Technology (S.B.); Princeton University (M.A., Ph.D.)
- Known for: Biocompatible liposome drug delivery design
- Awards: Elected Fellow of the American Institute for Medical and Biological Engineering (AIMBE) (2020); Presidential Early Career Award for Scientists and Engineers (PECASE) in the United States Department of Health and Human Services (2012); National Institutes of Health Director's New Innovator Award (2012); 50 Most Influential African-Americans in Technology List (2010)
- Scientific career
- Fields: Chemical engineering, biomedical engineering
- Workplaces: Northeastern University

Debra Auguste is an American chemical engineer and professor at Northeastern University in the department of chemical engineering. Auguste is dedicated to developing treatments for triple negative breast cancer, one of the most aggressive and fatal cancers that disproportionately affects African American women. Her lab characterizes biomarkers of triple negative breast cancer and develops novel biocompatible therapeutic technologies to target and destroy metastatic cancer cells. Auguste received the 2012 Presidential Early Career Award for Scientists and Engineers and in 2010 was named in the 50 Most Influential African-Americans in Technology. In 2020, Auguste became an Elected Fellow of the American Institute for Medical and Biological Engineering.

== Early life and education ==
Auguste pursued her undergraduate studies at the Massachusetts Institute of Technology in 1995. She majored in chemical engineering and graduated in 1999 with her Bachelor of Science. Following her undergraduate degree, Auguste pursued her Master's and her PhD in chemical engineering at Princeton University. She studied under the mentorship of Robert K. Prud'homme, where she designed and tested novel liposome structures for potential use in drug delivery platforms. She worked on creating hydrophobically-modified polyethylene glycol (PEG) polymers that can evade complement binding, an immune molecule that tags pathogens for immune system clearance and destruction. After completing her master's in 2004, Auguste further optimized the design of drug delivery liposomes with PEG protective layers so that they could be enabled to lose their protective layer once inside the cell to fuse with the endosome and release contents into the cell. She was able to design liposomes that conjugate PEG and maintain them at pH levels similar to blood, and then dissociate them once they arrive at pH levels below 7.4. Auguste completed her PhD in 2005.

Following her PhD training, Auguste began her postdoctoral fellowship at the Massachusetts Institute of Technology, working under the mentorship of Robert Langer. She worked in the department of chemical engineering optimizing liposomal drug delivery methods to deliver short interfering RNA (siRNA) to mediate gene knockdown. She built the liposomes based on her previous work using pH-dependent liposomes with the PEG coating to prevent immune opsonization, but with the added ability to deliver siRNA to the endosome of the cell. Auguste also helped to co-author the Third Edition of the Principals of Tissue Engineering Textbook. Auguste completed her postdoctoral training in 2006.

== Career and research ==
Auguste was appointed to the faculty at Harvard University in 2006, becoming an assistant professor of bioengineering in the Harvard School of Engineering Applied Sciences. As the principal investigator of the Auguste Lab, Auguste's research program focused on developing novel biomaterials for drug delivery systems through studying mechanisms of cell development and exploring how these mechanisms are perturbed by environmental signals. In 2011, Auguste was appointed to lecturer in the department of surgery at Harvard Medical School as well as assistant professor in the Department of Vascular Biology at Boston Children's Hospital. At this time she discovered a staggering statistic that changed the course of her research program. After finding that African American women have the highest breast cancer mortality rate, she began focusing on understanding which surface proteins might differ on the metastatic breast cancer cells of African American women versus other ethnic groups with the goal of drug design targeting that protein in the future.

In 2012, Auguste became an associate professor of biomedical engineering at the City University of New York while still holding her Assistant Professorship at Harvard Medical School. She worked in the Grove School of Engineering where her lab continued to focus on the discovery molecular targets for triple negative breast cancer as well as novel therapies to inhibit breast cancer metastasis.

In 2016, Auguste became a professor at Northeastern University in the college of engineering, department of chemical engineering. Her lab continues to focus on developing novel biocompatible drug delivery platforms, with an emphasis on drugs for treatment of triple negative breast cancer.

In addition to her faculty position and role as the principal investigator of the Auguste Lab at Northeastern, Auguste is also a member of the American Chemical Society, American Institute of Chemical Engineers, Biomedical Engineering Society, Materials Research Society, and is an associate editor for the Annals of Biomedical Engineering from the Biomedical Engineering Society.

=== Triple negative breast cancer drug development ===
Auguste's lab focuses on characterizing novel therapeutic targets for triple negative breast cancer and designing biocompatible drug delivery systems for treatment. Triple negative breast cancer is the most common cancer affecting African American women and it also remains the most difficult to test and treat due to the lack biomarkers. In 2014, Auguste and her lab found that ICAM-1 represents a marker for triple negative breast cancer as well as a potential molecular target for therapy. Their work was published in the Proceedings of the National Academy of Sciences in 2014.

Following this finding, Auguste and her team sought to determine an improved way of identifying and targeting triple negative breast cancer (TNBC) cells that did not rely on just one cellular marker. They instead looked at the ratio of ICAM-1 to another marker of TNBC, epithelial growth factor (EGFR), in order to design a therapeutic with the ability to bind multiple ligands at once to selectively target and identify TNBC cells. The complementary targeting of specific ligand ratios was enabled with a dual complementary liposome that specifically binds the ratio of EGFR and ICAM-1 on tumor cells. They showed that binding was effective and also that binding decreased receptor signalling and was able to interfere enough with cellular processes that it could minimize metastasis. Further the specificity of binding will enable targeted drug delivery to TNBC cells in the future as well. Due to the efficacy and promising potential of this technology, Auguste and her colleagues filed a patent for these cancer targeting liposomes in 2018.

Auguste, along with her colleagues at Boston Children's Hospital, has also pioneered a novel gene editing approach to treating TNBC. The developed a tumor-targeted nanolipogel system which targets tumors and enables CRISPR mediated knockout of Lipocalin2, a known breast cancer oncogene. This method was able to reduce tumor growth by 77% without toxicity to healthy tissues. The system again uses the approach of targeting ICAM-1 on TNBC cells via antibody binding of the liposome to the cells in order to specifically infect tumor cells. This article was also published in the Proceedings of the National Academy of Sciences.

== Awards and honors ==
- 2020: Elected Fellow of the American Institute for Medical and Biological Engineering (AIMBE)
- 2020: Named in the Top 100 Inspiring Black scientists in America by CellPress
- 2018: Elected to the board of directors of the Biomedical Engineering Society
- 2018: Elected Fellow of the Biomedical Engineering Society
- 2012: Presidential Early Career Award for Scientists and Engineers (PECASE) in the Department of Health and Human Services
- 2012: National Institutes of Health Director's New Innovator Award
- 2011: National Science Foundation CAREER Award in the Biomaterials Program
- 2010: Named 50 Most Influential African-Americans in Technology
- 2009: Young Faculty Award from DARPA
- 2008: Percy Julien Award for Outstanding Scientist of the Year
- 2007: Office of Naval Research Young Investigator Program Award
