= M. Amin Arnaout =

Lebanese physician

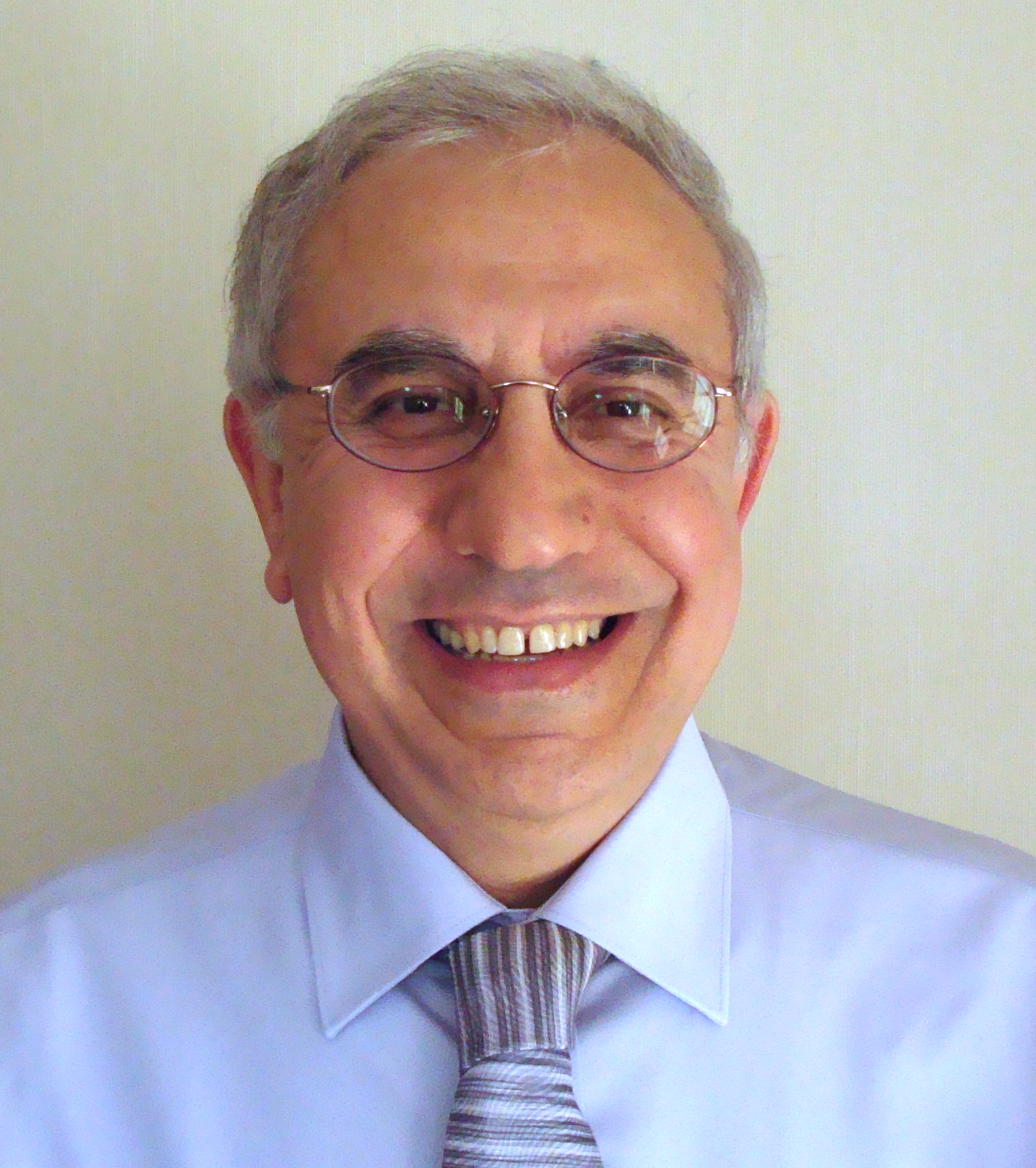
- Born: Sidon, Lebanon
- Education: American University of Beirut
- Known for: Cell adhesion, Integrins, Inflammation
- Awards: Kuwait Prize (2017); Homer W. Smith Award (2018); Visionary Award in Nephrology (2023); Member, National Academy of Sciences (2025)
- Scientific career
- Fields: Biology, Immunology, Medicine, Nephrology, Structural Biology
- Workplaces: Massachusetts General Hospital; Harvard Medical School; Children's Hospital Boston; Johns Hopkins University
- Academic advisors: Harvey R. Colten
- Website: www.massgeneral.org

M. Amin Arnaout is a Lebanese-American physician-scientist and nephrologist best known for seminal discoveries in the biology and structure of integrin receptors. He is Professor of Medicine at Harvard Medical School and Physician, former Chief of Nephrology, and Director of the Leukocyte Biology and Inflammation Laboratory at the Massachusetts General Hospital (MGH).

== Research ==
Arnaout’s research on the biology and structure of integrins has led to scientific observations that span the entire spectrum from gene discovery to 3-dimensional protein structure to clinical translation. He described an inherited deficiency in leukocyte adhesion in a lead article in the New England Journal of Medicine; defined the biochemical and molecular basis of this disease, which he traced to a deficiency in a family of leukocyte surface glycoprotein receptors, now known as leukocyte β2 integrins and elucidated the role of these cell adhesion molecules in the immune system. He was also the first to determine the crystal structures of integrins. His molecular and structural studies in integrins were instrumental in understanding the processes involved in organ development, maintenance of organ architecture and homeostasis in the adult, cancer growth and metastasis, and the response of organs to acute and chronic inflammatory or autoimmune injury. For example, in the kidney, integrins are now known to be critical in maintaining the kidney filtration barrier thus preventing loss of blood and proteins in the urine, and also mediate the respiratory distress observed in kidney failure patients when hemodialyzed using cuprophane membranes. Arnaout's current research aims at translating his discoveries in integrin biology and structure into novel and safer drugs for treating inflammatory, thrombotic, fibrotic and autoimmune diseases and cancer, using structure-based drug design.

His research on cell adhesion and integrins has been described as "concomitantly advancing the field one enormous stride," as "one of those spectacular results that will change a field", a "MIDAS touch to cell signaling" and has been featured in the lay press including the New York Times. His two research papers published in the journal Science are the two most quoted in the integrin field for the past 20 years.

Arnaout was the first to show that C3 nephritic factor is an autoantibody to the complement C3bBb convertase that activates the alternative complement pathway, a finding that suggested the potential of B cell or complement C5 depletion as adjunct therapies in certain forms of kidney inflammation. He was also the first to identify the antigen targeted by autoantibodies in patients with systemic vasculitis, which formed the basis for a routinely used diagnostic assay. He was the first to show that polycystin-1, one of two gene products mutated in patients with Autosomal Dominant Polycystic Kidney Disease (ADPKD), is required for the structural integrity of blood vessels, indicating that the early onset of high blood pressure and presence of vascular aneurysms in ADPKD is caused by a primary defect in vascular polycystin-1. In collaborative studies, he also showed that polycystin-2, the other gene product defective in ADPKD, is a TRP-like calcium channel, providing new insights into the molecular pathogenesis of ADPKD.
