= Ambuj Sagar =

Indian academic

Ambuj D. Sagar
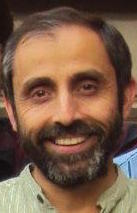
- Born: India
- Education: Indian Institute of Technology Delhi B.Tech; University of Michigan, Ann Arbor M.S. Massachusetts Institute of Technology M.S., PhD
- Known for: Contributions to IPCC
- Scientific career
- Fields: Climate Policy and Politics; Climate and Energy Technology Innovations; Innovation for Developmental Challenges; Engineering Education
- Workplaces: Indian Institute of Technology Delhi
- Doctoral advisor: Edward Wilson Merrill
- Website: hss.iitd.ac.in/content/prof-ambuj-d-sagar

Ambuj D. Sagar is the Vipula and Mahesh Chaturvedi Professor of Policy Studies at the Indian Institute of Technology Delhi. As of October 2022, he has been appointed as the deputy director (Strategy & Planning) at IIT Delhi. His interests broadly lie in science and technology policy, environmental policy, and development policy, with a particular focus on the interactions between technology and society. While his current research focuses mainly on energy innovation and climate policy, he also studies, more broadly, various facets of technology innovation, environmental policy politics and processes, and engineering education and research.

== Biography ==
Before joining the faculty at the Indian Institute of Technology Delhi in 2008, Ambuj Sagar was a senior research associate at Harvard University's John F. Kennedy School of Government, and assistant dean for strategic planning at Harvard's School of Engineering and Applied Sciences. His recent papers have dealt with energy innovation policy and strategies (in areas such as biofuels, coal power, and automobiles), climate change policy, and capacity development for the environment. He currently is advising or consulting with various agencies of the Indian Government and with several multilateral and bilateral organizations; while in the United States, he worked with a range of private and public-sector organizations (including as a staff researcher for a major study on energy R&D for the White House). He currently is a member of the Indian Government's Expert Committee on Low-Carbon Strategies for Inclusive Growth, the U.S.-India Track-II Dialogue on Climate Change, as well as other advisory groups in the Indian Government. Professor Ambuj is also a part of the Working Group III of the International Panel on Climate Change (IPCC) and contributed to the Assessment Report 5 or AR5. He is a lead author on both the technical summary as well as the Chapter on Sustainable Development and Equity (Chapter-4).
