= Harvey Borovetz =

American bioengineer

Harvey S. Borovetz is an American bioengineer who is currently a Distinguished Professor and former Chair of the Department of Bioengineering at the University of Pittsburgh and an Elected Fellow of the American Institute for Medical and Biological Engineering, Biomedical Engineering Society, Council on Arteriosclerosis, and American Heart Association.
