= Emily S. Day =

American biomedical engineer

- Born: Ponca City, Oklahoma, USA
- Spouse: John Slater

Academic background
- Education: B.S., Physics (Minor in Mathematics), 2006, University of Oklahoma; Ph.D., Bioengineering, 2011, Rice University

Emily S. Day is an American biomedical engineer. She is an associate professor at the University of Delaware where her research team engineers nanoparticles to enable high precision therapy of diseases including cancers, blood disorders, and maternal/fetal health complications.

== Early life and education ==
Day was born and raised in Ponca City, Oklahoma. She earned her Bachelor of Science degree in Physics, with a minor in Mathematics, from the University of Oklahoma before completing her PhD in Bioengineering from Rice University. She then earned a Postdoctoral Fellowship at Northwestern University.

== Career ==
Upon completing her postdoctoral fellowship at Northwestern, Day became an assistant professor of Biomedical Engineering at the University of Delaware. There, she leads the Day Lab, which seeks to transform disease management through the development of nanomedicines. Her group has made substantial contributions to the fields of photothermal therapy and gene regulation. In photothermal therapy, nanoparticles delivered into tumors are excited with externally-applied near-infrared light, causing the nanoparticles to produce heat sufficient to destroy the cancer cells. The goal of gene regulation is to "modulate the expression of the genes that drive the cancer growth." In addition to developing ribonucleic acid (RNA) nanocarriers that enable RNA interference-mediated gene regulation, Day and her team have developed antibody-nanoparticle conjugates that can regulate cancer cell signaling by binding to cancer cell-specific transmembrane receptors and blocking their interaction with extracellular ligands. These antibody-nanoparticle conjugates are more effective than freely delivered antibodies, which Day and her team attribute to multivalent binding (the ability of the antibody-nanoparticle conjugates to engage multiple receptors simultaneously).

Day has received numerous grants to support her research, including a National Science Foundation CAREER award and a National Institutes of Health R35 award. Day's notable accolades include the 2018 Gerard J. Mangone Young Scholars Award from the University of Delaware Francis Alison Society and the Rita Schaffer Young Investigator Award from the Biomedical Engineering Society. In recognition of her academic accomplishments, Day was selected to participate in the National Academy of Engineering’s U.S. Frontiers of Engineering symposium.

During the COVID-19 pandemic in North America, Day was promoted from assistant professor to associate professor with tenure. In 2022, she was elected a Fellow of the American Institute for Medical and Biological Engineering for "developing engineered nanoparticles that are transforming basic science and translational medicine and exemplary service greatly increasing DEI in STEM."

Day has received additional recognition for her scholarly contributions beyond her early-career awards. In 2022, she received the University of Delaware's Mid-Career Faculty Excellence in Scholarship Award and was named an Emerging Investigator by the journal Biomaterials Science. She also received the 2020 Michael Bowman Biomedical Engineering Innovation Award and was named an Emerging Investigator by the Journal of Materials Chemistry B that same year.

== Research ==
Day has had a advanced field of nanoparticle mediated photothermal therapy (PTT) for cancer treatments. Her research mainly focuses on engineering nanostructures that selectively accumulate in tumors can convert near infrared light into localized heat. That enables higher targeted tumors while minimizing damage surrounding healthy tissue. Day's work is designed to multifunction nanoplatforms that combine photothermal therapy with therapeutic strategies, such as chemotherapy, immunotherapy, gene regulation and enhance anti-tumor efficacy. Her studies demonstrate how certain materials, nanoshells, nanorods and more, optimized light adsorption in the NIR region, where the tissue is the greatest. Additionally, the importance of her research highlights nanoparticle surface functionalization through gold-thoil chemistry. All together Day's contribution. has helped establish gold nanoparticle mediated photothermal therapy. That promises a platform for precision for nanomedicine and cancer treatment strategies.

One of her more recent publications in 2020 on Nanoparticle-mediated co-delivery of Notch- 1 antibodies and ABT- touches on triple-negative breast cancer therapies remaining elusive due to TNBC cells lacking expression of the three most common receptors seen on other subtypes of breast cancer. In the publication she discusses how her team and her exploited TNBC cells overexpression of Notch-1 receptors and Bcl-2 anti-apoptotic proteins in order to provide an effective new targeted therapy.

== Personal life ==
Day is married to John Hundley Slater, a fellow Associate Professor of Biomedical Engineering at the University of Delaware.
