= Thrombogenicity =

Tendency of material in contact with blood to produce a clot

IUPAC definition

Property of a material (or substance) that induces and/or promotes
the formation of a thrombus.

Thrombogenicity refers to the tendency of a material in contact with the blood to produce a thrombus, or clot. It not only refers to fixed thrombi but also to emboli, thrombi which have become detached and travel through the bloodstream. Thrombogenicity can also encompass events such as the activation of immune pathways and the complement system. All materials are considered to be thrombogenic with the exception of the normal state of endothelial cells which line blood vessels. Certain medical implants appear non-thrombogenic due to high flow rates of blood past the implant, but in reality all are thrombogenic to a degree. Various surface treatments are available to minimize these thrombogenic effects.

The process begins when blood proteins coat any artificial surface within seconds, changing shape in ways that trigger the body's clotting and immune systems to activate. Laboratory testing of thrombogenicity follows international standards but remains challenging because different research facilities use varying methods, making it difficult to compare results between studies. Efforts are now underway to create standardised reference materials and testing protocols that will allow more reliable prediction of how medical devices will perform in patients.

== Mechanisms ==
When blood first touches an artificial surface, plasma proteins quickly cover it, forming a protein coating within seconds. The shape these proteins take on the surface is more important than the amount: unfolding of fibrinogen—and even albumin, usually thought of as inert—exposes normally hidden binding sites that let platelets attach. Such shear- or adsorption-induced shape changes set the stage for clot formation.

Protein adsorption can also activate the body's clotting (coagulation) and immune defence systems (complement cascades). Negatively charged, easily wetted by blood, or highly hydrophobic materials trigger contact activation (a clotting process triggered by foreign surfaces): factor XII attaches to the surface, changes shape, and becomes active as the enzyme α-FXIIa, which then drives a chain of reactions that converges on thrombin generation and fibrin deposition. Side-by-side, the alternative complement pathway is often engaged, especially on hydrophobic or amine-rich polymers, when complement component C3 becomes permanently attached and turns into the reactive fragment C3b. The simultaneous release of bradykinin, clotting factors, and chemotactic peptides links blood clotting with inflammatory responses.

Platelets recognise the newly exposed binding sites, adhere, spread pseudopods, and release soluble agonists such as ADP and P-selectin that recruit more platelets; exposed phosphatidylserine on their membranes accelerates thrombin generation, so a stable fibrin-rich thrombus can grow within minutes. Activated platelets also present P-selectin that captures white blood cells, whose own granule contents amplify both clotting and inflammatory signals. Continued build-up may occlude a medical device or blood vessel, while fragments can break away as emboli (travelling clots) and get stuck in smaller vessels, risking stroke or pulmonary infarction. This entire process can happen within minutes of blood contact with an artificial surface.

== Testing and standards ==
Standardised testing is essential because medical devices must be proven safe before reaching patients. Regulatory agencies consider thrombogenicity as one aspect of how well medical devices work with blood (hemocompatibility). The key document is ISO 10993-4: Biological evaluation of medical devices – Selection of tests for interactions with blood, which groups mandatory laboratory assessments into five categories: coagulation, haematology, immunology, platelets and thrombosis. Although the European Union's Medical Device Regulation (EU 2017/745) requires both in vitro and in vivo verification, it allows researchers to choose their own specific methods, so accepted standard operating procedures for blood handling, donor selection, anticoagulation and flow conditions are still lacking. As a result, laboratories adopt markedly different pre-analytical steps and test set-ups, making it difficult to compare results between studies. The standard nevertheless recommends specific biochemical readouts—such as thrombin–antithrombin complexes (TAT, markers of clot formation), prothrombin fragment 1+2 and fibrinopeptide A—to gauge thrombin and fibrin generation.

Practical testing usually begins with low-shear or low-movement tests that measure platelet adhesion, spreading and micro-thrombus formation on the material surface by light or electron microscopy; these straightforward screens avoid problems caused by blood flow forces and are sensitive to early protein layers that form on surfaces. Parallel quantification of circulating (non-adherent) platelets and their activation markers—such as P-selectin, platelet factor 4 or β-thromboglobulin—by flow cytometry or ELISA provides complementary information when surfaces activate platelets without them sticking firmly. To mimic clinical flow, dynamic loop or specialised devices that spin blood samples recirculate fresh whole blood over test coupons, enabling measurements taken over time of platelet consumption, thrombin surge and fibrin deposition under physiologic shear. These platforms satisfy all five ISO categories, but their outputs still vary with variation between different blood donors and subtle protocol changes.

Efforts to improve reproducibility now focus on reference materials and multicentre validation. A recent round-robin study (where multiple laboratories test the same samples) showed that laboratories could classify polymer surfaces consistently when platelet activation and adhesion were measured using harmonised methods; similar multi-site work with whole blood is planned to extend the approach to all ISO 10993-4 categories. Consensus standards will allow thrombogenicity data to be compared across devices and to serve as reliable proxies for in-vivo performance.

== See also ==
- Endothelial activation
