= Ashutosh Chilkoti =

Indian biomedical engineer

- Born: India
- Occupations: Biomedical engineer, academic, researcher, and serial entrepreneur
- Awards: NSF CAREER Award, National Science Foundation (1998); Clemson Award for Contributions to the Literature, Society for Biomaterials (2011); Pritzker Distinguished Lecture Award, Biomedical Engineering Society (2013)

Academic background
- Education: B.Tech., Chemical Engineering; Ph.D., Chemical Engineering
- Alma mater: Indian Institute of Technology; University of Washington

Academic work
- Institutions: Duke University

Ashutosh Chilkoti is an Indian American biomedical engineer, academic, researcher and serial entrepreneur. He is the Alan L. Kaganov Professor of Biomedical Engineering in the Pratt School of Engineering at Duke University.

Chilkoti has published over 350 papers, has been cited 48,000 times, has a Google Scholar H-index of 116 and has 62 US patents awarded. His research is focused on genetically encoded materials and biointerface science and he has pioneered the development of high-throughput and scalable methods for the recombinant synthesis of repetitive polypeptides, invented a method to purify protein drugs without chromatography, and developed a technology for point-of-care clinical diagnostics. He has founded five start-up companies, including PhaseBio Pharmaceuticals in 2002, Sentilus in 2011, Gateway Bio in 2017, Isolere Bio in 2018, and inSoma Bio in 2019.

Chilkoti is a Fellow of American Association for the Advancement of Science, National Academy of Inventors, Biomedical Engineering Society, Controlled Release Society, International Union of Societies for Biomaterials Science and Engineering and American Institute for Medical and Biological Engineering (AIMBE).

== Education ==
Chilkoti obtained his Bachelor of Technology degree in Chemical Engineering from the IIT Delhi in 1985. He pursued his graduate studies at the University of Washington, where he earned his Ph.D. in Chemical Engineering in 1991, and carried out post-doctoral studies in the Center for Bioengineering from 1991 to 1995, also at the University of Washington.

== Career ==
Chilkoti joined Duke University in 1996 as an assistant professor of biomedical engineering. He was promoted to associate professor in 2002 and professor in 2006. He was the Theo Pilkington Chair Professor of Biomedical Engineering from 2008 to 2013, and has been the Alan L. Kaganov Distinguished Professor of Biomedical Engineering at Duke University since 2013.

From 2002 till 2007, Chilkoti served as associate director of the Center for Biologically Inspired Materials and Material Systems at Duke University and was the director of the center from 2007 to 2011. In 2014, he became Chair of the Department of Biomedical Engineering at Duke University and served as chair until 2022. As Chair of the Duke BME department, he launched an incubator—BRiDGE—for Biomedical Engineering faculty and student startups, and he created the Duke Engineering Entrepreneurship program (DEEP)—a post-doctoral fellowship program for recent PhD graduates of the department interested in entrepreneurship. Since 2023, he has been serving as the senior associate dean of Pratt School of Engineering at Duke University.

Chilkoti founded two Gordon Research Conferences (GRCs)—one on Biointerface Science in 2006 and a second on Bioinspired Materials in 2012. Furthermore, he is the founder of five start-ups. These companies include Sentilus, a clinical diagnostics company that was acquired by Immucor in 2014, Phase Bio Pharmaceuticals—a drug delivery company—that had an IPO on NASDAQ in 2018, Isolere Bio—that uses ELPs to purify complex biologics without chromatography—that was acquired by Donaldson in 2023, and inSoma Bio, that has focused on commercializing injectable biomaterials developed in his laboratory for tissue reconstruction.

== Research ==
Chilkoti's research has focused on protein engineering, polymer chemistry, biointerface science, and nanobiotechnology.

=== Genetically encoded polymers ===
Chilkoti is most known for his work on genetically engineered elastin-like polypeptides (ELPs), which exhibit thermally responsive behavior and have been exploited by his group to develop new technologies and materials for protein purification, controlled drug release, and tissue engineering. He has also pioneered the development of high-throughput and scalable methods for the recombinant synthesis of repetitive peptide polymers that are useful for the recombinant synthesis of ELPs and other repetitive polypeptides. He developed a new non-chromatographic method for the purification of proteins. He also pioneered the development of injectable depots of ELPs fused to peptide and protein drugs for sustained—week or longer—release, and ELP nanoparticles loaded with small molecule chemotherapeutics for cancer therapy. His research group also developed a new class of partially ordered polypeptides that undergo a phase transition from a liquid into a highly porous solid network at body temperature.

=== Intrinsically disordered proteins ===
Using a method for the rapid and multiplexed gene synthesis of repetitive polypeptides, Chilkoti created new variants of ELPs that show phase separation. He then built upon these findings to identify new sequence heuristics that enable the de novo design of repetitive polypeptides that show LCST and UCST phase behavior. He postulated that the low sequence complexity, structural disorder, and phase separation behavior of these repetitive polypeptides make them an interesting class of minimal synthetic intrinsically disordered proteins IDPs (synIDPs), and suggested that these SynIDPs can provide insights into the behavior of other more complex, native IDPs. His group has started to exploit the phase transition behavior of two classes of SynIDPs—ELPs that exhibit LCST phase behavior and resilin-like polypeptides (RLPs) that exhibit UCST phase behavior—to create artificial condensates within cells whose material properties and function can be precisely programmed at the sequence level of the SynIDP to reprogram cellular function by spatio-temporally controlling the flow genetic information and biochemical signals within the cell. His later work on functional artificial condensates of SynIDPs in cells includes sequestration of mRNA in a condensate regulate protein translation, sequestration of an enzyme in an artificial condensate to amplify its activity, sequestration of a plasmid to control gene flow in bacteria and recruitment of the transcriptional machinery to amplify gene expression.

=== Next generation PEGylation ===
Chilkoti's research group has developed next-generation polyethylene glycol (PEG)-like conjugates that overcome the immunogenicity issues associated with traditional PEGylation. PEGylation—the attachment of polyethylene glycol (PEG) to biologics—is commonly used to increase their half-life or reduce their immunogenicity, but PEG has itself proven to be antigenic and can elicit a serious anaphylactic response. To overcome these limitations, he designed a new PEG-like stealth hyperbranched polymer that breaks up the long antigenic ethylene glycol sequence in PEG and presents them as much shorter side-chains along a polymer backbone. Peptides and proteins conjugated to this next-generation PEG-like polymer show even longer circulation than PEG conjugates, do not bind to pre-existing anti-PEG antibodies that most people have developed, and do not generate an immune response to this new polymer. He has demonstrated the utility of this technology with a peptide drug for type 2 diabetes, an enzyme drug used to treat gout and an aptamer drug.

=== Clinical diagnostics ===
Chilkoti has made contributions to biosensors and clinical diagnostics. His group was the first to demonstrate the use of surface-initiated polymerization to synthesize "nonfouling" polymer brushes from diverse surfaces that completely resist the adsorption of proteins and the adhesion of cells. He then used these nonfouling polymer brushes to develop a protein microarray that enables multiplexed detection of protein analytes with a femtomolar limit-of-detection directly from whole blood. Building upon this work, his group then invented the D4 point-of-care testing (POCT) technology, which enables rapid and accurate disease diagnosis by the quantitative measurement of multiple analytes at sub-picomolar concentrations from a drop of blood without user intervention. This technology led to the formation of a startup company —Sentilus—‚ that was acquired by Immucor in 2014. His group later used the D4 POCT for serology for COVID-19, COVID-19 variant detection, and detection of Ebolavirus.

=== Plasmonic biosensors ===
Chilkoti introduced an optical method to quantify biomolecular interactions in real time at the surface of an optically transparent substrate. He used this approach to design a label-free plasmonic biosensor in a chip format. Furthermore, he identified several factors to improve the performance of immobilized metal nanoparticle sensors. Moreover, he also conducted a study to discuss the applications of tunable absorption in designing controlled-emissivity surfaces for thermophotovoltaic devices, producing detector elements for imaging and tailoring an infrared spectrum for controlled thermal dissipation.

== Awards and honors ==
- 1998 - NSF CAREER Award, National Science Foundation
- 2002 - 3M Nontenured Faculty Award, Duke University
- 2005 - Stansell Family Distinguished Research Award, Duke University
- 2007 - Fellow, American Institute for Medical and Biological Engineering (AIMBE)
- 2010 - Humboldt Senior Researcher Award, Alexander von Humboldt Foundation
- 2011 - Clemson Award for "Contributions to the Literature", Society for Biomaterials
- 2013 - Pritzker Distinguished Lecture Award, Biomedical Engineering Society
- 2013 - Fellow, Biomedical Engineering Society
- 2013 - Fellow, Controlled Release Society
- 2014 - Fellow, National Academy of Inventors
- 2018 - Chandra P. Sharma award, Society for Biomaterials and Artificial Organs (India)
- 2020 - Fellow, American Association for the Advancement of Science
- 2020 - Fellow, Biomaterials Science and Engineering, International Union of Societies for Biomaterials Science and Engineering
- 2022 – Outstanding Postdoc Mentor award, Duke university

== Selected articles ==
- Meyer, D. E., & Chilkoti, A. (1999). Purification of recombinant proteins by fusion with thermally-responsive polypeptides. Nature Biotechnology, 17(11), 1112–1115.
- Nath, N., & Chilkoti, A. (2002). A colorimetric gold nanoparticle sensor to interrogate biomolecular interactions in real time on a surface. Analytical chemistry, 74(3), 504–509.
- Ma, H., Hyun, J. Chilkoti, A. (2004). "Nonfouling" oligoethylene glycol functionalized polymer brushes synthesized by surface-initiated atom transfer radical polymerization. Advanced Materials, 16, 338–341.
- Dreher, M. R., Liu, W., Michelich, C. R., Dewhirst, M. W., Yuan, F., & Chilkoti, A. (2006). Tumor vascular permeability, accumulation, and penetration of macromolecular drug carriers. Journal of the National Cancer Institute, 98(5), 335–344.
- Ciracì, C., Hill, R. T., Mock, J. J., Urzhumov, Y., Fernández-Domínguez, A. I., Maier, S. A., ... & Smith, D. R. (2012). Probing the ultimate limits of plasmonic enhancement. Science, 337(6098), 1072–1074.
