= Helen H. Lu =

Chinese American biomedical engineer

- Education: University of Pennsylvania (BS, PhD)
- Scientific career
- Fields: Tissue engineering
- Workplaces: Fu Foundation School of Engineering and Applied Science
- Thesis: 45S5 bioactive glass surface zeta potential variations in electrolyte solutions with and without fibronectin (1998)
- Doctoral advisor: Solomon R. Pollack; Paul Ducheyne

Helen Haiyan Lu is a Chinese American biomedical engineer and the Percy K. and Vida L. W. Hudson professor of biomedical engineering at the Columbia University Fu Foundation School of Engineering and Applied Science. Her work focuses on understanding and developing therapies in complex tissue systems, especially the interface between soft tissue and bone.

== Education ==
Lu studied bioengineering at the University of Pennsylvania for her undergraduate and doctoral degrees. Her thesis focused on characterization of bioactive glasses. Lu completed postdoctoral fellowships with Cato T. Laurencin at Drexel University (1998–00) and David Kaplan at Tufts University (2001).

== Career ==
Lu has been a faculty member at Columbia since 2001, where she directs the biomaterials and interface tissue engineering laboratory. She has been a full professor in biomedical engineering since 2014, and has also held appointments in the department of dental and craniofacial bioengineering. Lu is a member of the Tissue Engineering and Regenerative Medicine International Society American continental council.

Her work in regenerative engineering includes developing scaffolds for stem cell growth, for which she was honored by Presidential Early Career Award in 2010. In 2011, Lu was elected a Fellow of the American Institute for Medical and Biological Engineering.

Lu has studied biomaterials for regeneration of tendons and ligaments extensively, focusing on bioinspired approaches. In particular, her recent research has focused on rotator cuff repair, although potential applications extend to any soft tissue-bone interface repairs. Lu has said that integrative tissue engineering will eventually "pave the way for total limb regeneration."

== Awards and honors ==
- 2005 Y-ROBOTS Award for young investigator in orthopedic biomechanics and sports medicine
- 2005 Wallace H. Coulter Foundation Early Career Award in Translational Research
- 2008 Society for Biomaterials Young Investigator Award
- 2010 Presidential Early Career Award for Scientists and Engineers
