= Esmaiel Jabbari =

Iranian American chemical engineer

- Born: August 8, 1961 (age 65); Iran
- Education: Purdue University, Virginia Tech
- Scientific career
- Fields: Biomaterials; Tissue engineering Stem cell engineering Drug delivery
- Workplaces: University of South Carolina
- Doctoral advisor: Nicholas A. Peppas

Esmaiel Jabbari (born August 8, 1961) is an Iranian American professor of biomedical engineering at the University of South Carolina.

== Education ==
Jabbari obtained his B.S. in chemical engineering from Virginia Tech in 1982 and then got his master's degree in chemistry and chemical engineering from the same place in 1986 and 1989 respectively. He then continued his education at Purdue University, where, after spending five years under the supervision from Nicholas A. Peppas, he received his Ph.D. in chemical engineering.

== Career ==
From 1993 to 1994 Jabbari was a postdoctoral research fellow at Monsanto Biotechnical Group and then became an adjunct professor of chemical engineering at the Washington University. Until September 2001, Esmaiel Jabbari worked as an associate professor at Tehran Polytechnic (now Amirkabir University of Technology). From September 2001 to July 2002 he was a visiting scholar at Rice University. He also served as senior research associate at Mayo Clinic. Since 2015 Jabbari works as professor of chemical and biomedical engineering, after propelling to it from tenured and associate in 2004 and 2009, respectively. During those times, he was a visiting professor at Tohoku University in Tōhoku Region, Japan, and at Brigham and Women's Hospital.

== Awards and honors ==
- Omega Rho (1988)
- Sigma Xi (1988)
- Phi Lambda Upsilon (1989)
- Outstanding College Students of America (1989)
- Tau Beta Pi (2006)
