= W. Mark Saltzman =

American bioengineer

- Born: September 8, 1959 (age 67); United States
- Education: Iowa State University; Massachusetts Institute of Technology
- Scientific career
- Fields: Biomedical Engineering
- Workplaces: Johns Hopkins; Cornell University; Yale University
- Doctoral advisor: Robert S. Langer

William Mark Saltzman is an American biomedical engineer. He was named Goizueta Foundation Professor of Biomedical and Chemical Engineering at Yale University on July 1, 2002, and became the founding chair of Yale's Department of Biomedical Engineering in 2003. Saltzman's research aims to promote new methods for drug delivery and develop new biotechnologies to combat human disease. A pioneer in the fields of biomaterials, nanobiotechnology, and tissue engineering, Saltzman has contributed to the design and implementation of a number of clinical technologies that have become essential to medical practice today.

== Biography ==
Saltzman received a B.S. in Chemical Engineering in 1981 from Iowa State University, followed by an M.S. in Chemical Engineering in 1984 and a Ph.D. in Medical Engineering in 1987, both at the Massachusetts Institute of Technology.

As a graduate student at the Massachusetts Institute of Technology (MIT), Saltzman built scaffolds that could be seeded with cells to sculpt new replacement tissues. He also created drug-impregnated implants from polymers that slowly and steadily release medicines for long period. This work eventually led to the development of GLIADEL, a chemotherapy-loaded polymer wafer that neurosurgeons implant in the brain to combat glioblastoma multiforme (GBM), one of the most aggressive types of malignant brain tumors.

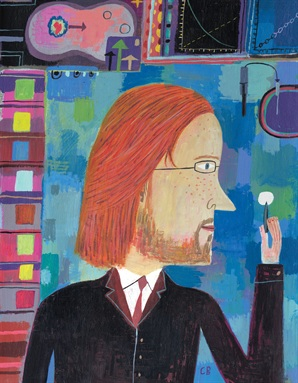
Discovering the Gliadel Wafer

He was appointed assistant professor of Chemical Engineering at Johns Hopkins University in 1987 and received a joint appointment in the Department of Biomedical Engineering at The Johns Hopkins School of Medicine in 1990. He was promoted to associate professor in 1992 and to Professor in 1995. In 1996, he moved to Cornell University, holding the first BP Amoco/H. Laurance Fuller Chair in Chemical Engineering.

He joined the faculty at Yale University, as the Goizueta Foundation Professor of Chemical and Biomedical Engineering, in July 2002 and became the first chair of Yale's Department of Biomedical Engineering in 2003, building a 19-strong faculty group. Saltzman's work at Yale has focused on imaging, biomolecular engineering, biomechanics, and systems biology.

As of July 1, 2016, Saltzman serves as Head of Jonathan Edwards College at Yale University.

== Research ==
Saltzman's research focuses on developing the most economical, transportable and accessible methods for disease prevention and methods to more effectively deliver chemotherapy to the most aggressive forms of brain tumors. His research interests include controlled drug delivery to the brain, polymers for supplementing or stimulating the immune system, cell interactions with polymers, and tissue engineering; he has also studied how to create safer and more effective medical and surgical therapy based on tissue engineering. Saltzman worked with an interdisciplinary team to develop what is now the standard of care for treating brain tumors.

== Awards and honors ==
- Elected Member, National Academy of Engineering (2018)
- Elected Member, National Academy of Medicine (formerly Institute of Medicine) (2014)
- Mines Medalist, South Dakota School of Mines (2014)
- Fellow, National Academy of Inventors (2013)
- Fellow, Biomedical Engineering Society (2010)

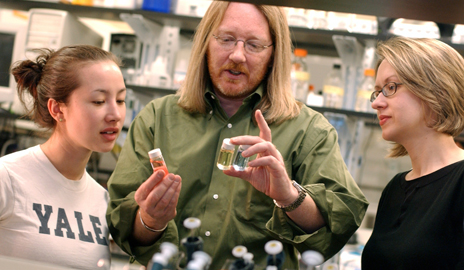
Committed to Undergraduate Teaching

- Sheffield Teaching Prize, Yale University (2009)
- Paper selected as one of top 25 published over past 25 years in Biomaterials (2006)
- Distinguished Lecturer Award, Biomedical Engineering Society (2004)
- BP Amoco/H.Laurence Fuller Chair in Chemical Engineering at Cornell (2001)
- Britton Chance Distinguished Lecturer in Engineering and Medicine, at the University of Pennsylvania (2000)
- Professional Progress in Engineering Award from Iowa State University (2000)
- Member, Surgery & Bioengineering Study Section (NIH) (1999)
- Richard Tucker Excellence in Teaching Award (Cornell) (1999)
- Fellow, American Institute for Medical and Biological Engineering (1997)
- Controlled Release Society Young Investigator Award (1996)
- Allan C. Davis Medal as Maryland's Outstanding Young Engineer (1995)
- Distinguished Faculty Award for Excellence in Undergraduate Education (Johns Hopkins) (1995)
- Camille and Henry Dreyfus Foundation Teacher-Scholar Award. (1990)

== Works ==
Books

- Drug Delivery: Engineering Principles for Drug Therapy, 2001, Published by Oxford University Press.
- Tissue Engineering: Engineering principles for the design of replacement organs and tissues, 2004, Published by Oxford University Press.
- Biomedical Engineering: Bridging Medicine and Technology, Second Edition, 2015, Published by Cambridge University Press.

Selected Publications

- McNeer, NA; Chin, JY; Schleifman, EB; Fields, RJ; Glazer, PM; Saltzman, WM (2011). "Nanoparticles deliver triplex-forming PNAs for site-specific genomic recombination in CD34+ human hematopoietic progenitors". Mol Ther. 19 (1): 172–80. doi:10.1038/mt.2010.200. PMC 3017438. PMID 20859257.
- Zhou, J; Liu, J; Cheng, C. J; Patel, T. R; Weller, C. E; Piepmeier, J. M; Jiang, Z; Saltzman, W. M (2011). "Biodegradable poly(amine-co-ester) terpolymers for targeted gene delivery". Nature Materials. 11 (1): 82–90. doi:10.1038/nmat3187. PMC 4180913. PMID 22138789.
- Babar, I. A; Cheng, C. J; Booth, C. J; Liang, X; Weidhaas, J. B; Saltzman, W. M; Slack, F. J (2012). "Nanoparticle-based therapy in an in vivo microRNA-155 (miR-155)-dependent mouse model of lymphoma". Proceedings of the National Academy of Sciences. 109 (26): E1695–E1704. doi:10.1073/pnas.1201516109. PMC 3387084. PMID 22685206.

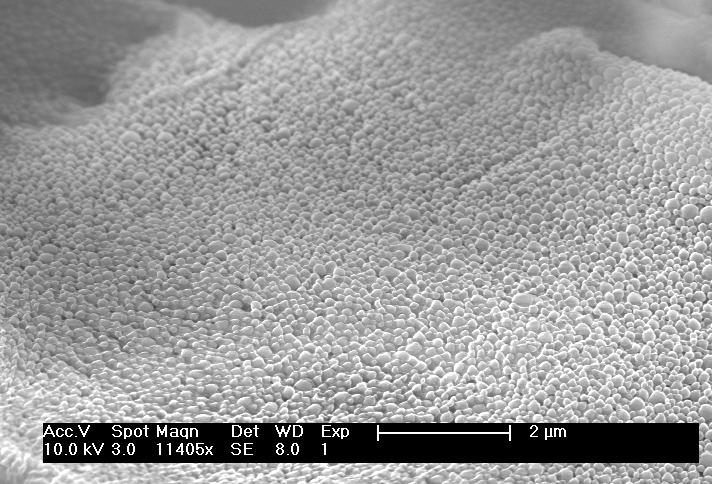
SEM image of nanoparticles

- Zhou, J; Patel, T. R; Sirianni, R. W; Strohbehn, G; Zheng, M. Q; Duong, N; Schafbauer, T; Huttner, A. J; Huang, Y; Carson, R. E; Zhang, Y; Sullivan Jr, D. J; Piepmeier, J. M; Saltzman, W. M (2013). "Highly penetrative, drug-loaded nanocarriers improve treatment of glioblastoma". Proceedings of the National Academy of Sciences. 110 (29): 11751–11756. Bibcode:2013PNAS..11011751Z. doi:10.1073/pnas.1304504110. PMC 3718184. PMID 23818631.
- Devalliere, J; Chang, W. G; Andrejecsk, J. W; Abrahimi, P; Cheng, C. J; Jane-Wit, D; Saltzman, W. M; Pober, J. S (2014). "Sustained delivery of proangiogenic microRNA-132 by nanoparticle transfection improves endothelial cell transplantation". The FASEB Journal. 28 (2): 908–922. doi:10.1096/fj.13-238527. PMC 3898640. PMID 24221087.
- Weiser, J. R; Saltzman, W. M (2014). "Controlled release for local delivery of drugs: Barriers and models". Journal of Controlled Release. 190: 664–73. doi:10.1016/j.jconrel.2014.04.048. PMC 4142083. PMID 24801251.
- Cheng, C. J; Bahal, R; Babar, I. A; Pincus, Z; Barrera, F; Liu, C; Svoronos, A; Braddock, D. T; Glazer, P. M; Engelman, D. M; Saltzman, W. M; Slack, F. J (2015). "MicroRNA silencing for cancer therapy targeted to the tumour microenvironment". Nature. 518 (7537): 107–10. Bibcode:2015Natur.518..107C. doi:10.1038/nature13905. PMC 4367962. PMID 25409146.
- McNeer, N. A; Anandalingam, K; Fields, R. J; Caputo, C; Kopic, S; Gupta, A; Quijano, E; Polikoff, L; Kong, Y; Bahal, R; Geibel, J. P; Glazer, P. M; Saltzman, W. M; Egan, M. E (2015). "Nanoparticles that deliver triplex-forming peptide nucleic acid molecules correct F508del CFTR in airway epithelium". Nature Communications. 6: 6952. Bibcode:2015NatCo...6.6952M. doi:10.1038/ncomms7952. PMC 4480796. PMID 25914116.
- Abrahimi, P; Chang, W. G; Kluger, M. S; Qyang, Y; Tellides, G; Saltzman, W. M; Pober, J. S (2015). "Efficient gene disruption in cultured primary human endothelial cells by CRISPR/Cas9". Circulation Research. 117 (2): 121–8. doi:10.1161/CIRCRESAHA.117.306290. PMC 4490936. PMID 25940550.
