= Christopher N. Bowman =

American chemical engineer (born 1967)

Christopher N. Bowman (born March 9, 1967) is an American chemical engineer, and the James and Catherine Patten Endowed Chair at University of Colorado Boulder.

He earned a bachelor's degree and doctorate from Purdue University. Bowman began teaching at the University of Colorado Boulder in 1992, and was named a distinguished professor in 2012. He became a member of the National Academy of Medicine in 2018 and received the Roy W. Tess Award in Coatings from the American Chemical Society's Division of Polymeric Materials: Science and Engineering that same year. He became a member of the National Academy of Engineering in 2021.

Bowman married Kristi Anseth in 2003.
