= Nicholas A. Peppas =

Greek chemical and biomedical engineer (b. 1948)

- Nicholas A. Peppas
- Born: 25 August 1948 (age 78); Athens, Greece
- Education: Massachusetts Institute of Technology, National Technical University of Athens
- Known for: Hydrogels, swellable systems, swelling/syneresis, polymer physics, nanotechnology, nano materials, Peppas equation, Korsmeyer-Peppas equation, Peppas-Reinhart theory, Brannon-Peppas theory, oral protein delivery, intelligent polymers, recognitive release systems, regenerative medicine, convergence.
- Awards: National Academy of Engineering, Founders Award (2012), Honorary doctorates Univ. Ghent, Univ. Parma, Univ. Athens, Univ. Patras, Univ. Ljubliana, Giulio Natta Medal (2014), ACS Applied Polymer Science Award (2014), Benjamin Garver Lamme Award ASEE (2013), Acta Biomaterialia Gold Medal (2010), SURA Award (2010), Founders Award AIChE (2008), Janot Award (2010), Galletti Award AIMBE (2008), Walker Award AIChE (2006), Bailey Award SBE (2006)
- Scientific career
- Fields: Chemical Engineering, Biomedical Engineering, Biomaterials, Drug Delivery, Tissue Engineering
- Workplaces: The University of Texas at Austin; Purdue University
- Doctoral advisor: Edward Wilson Merrill
- Website: https://www.bme.utexas.edu/about-us/faculty-directory/peppas

Nicholas (Nikolaos) Athanasiou Peppas (Greek: Νικόλαος Α. Πέππας; born 25 August 1948, in Athens, Greece) is a chemical and biomedical engineer whose leadership in biomaterials science and engineering, drug delivery, bionanotechnology, pharmaceutical sciences, chemical and polymer engineering has provided seminal foundations based on the physics and mathematical theories of nanoscale, macromolecular processes and drug/protein transport and has led to numerous biomedical products and devices.

== Education and work ==
Peppas was educated in chemical engineering at the National Technical University of Athens (D. Eng., 1971) and at the Massachusetts Institute of Technology (Sc.D., 1973) under the direction of bioengineering pioneer Edward W. Merrill. Subsequently, he was a postdoctoral fellow in the Arteriosclerosis Center of the Massachusetts Institute of Technology under world biomedical leaders Clark K. Colton, Kenneth A. Smith and Robert S. Lees.

He is the Cockrell Family Regents Chair #6 in Engineering at the University of Texas at Austin. He has been at the University of Texas at Austin since December 2002 and is serving as the director of the Institute of Biomaterials, Drug Delivery, and Regenerative Medicine, and its Laboratory of Biomaterials, Drug Delivery and Bionanotechnology with appointments in the department of chemical engineering, the Department of Biomedical Engineering and the College of Pharmacy at the University of Texas at Austin. Before 2002, he was the Showalter Distinguished Professor of Biomedical Engineering and professor of chemical engineering at Purdue University.

Peppas is a researcher and inventor in the field of drug delivery and controlled release. He is also a leader in biomaterials, bionanotechnology, nano materials and bionanotechnology, and the fields of feedback controlled biomedical devices and molecular recognition.His contributions have been translated into more than twenty medical products.

Peppas is a member of the US National Academy of Medicine, the US National Academy of Engineering (NAE), the National Academy of Inventors (NAI), the Académie Nationale of France, the Academy of Athens, the Real Academia Nacional de Farmacia of Spain and the Academy of Medicine, Engineering and Sciences of Texas (TAMEST). Very few chemical engineers are members of both NAE and IOM (including Frances Arnold, Mark Davis, David Mooney of Harvard, and David A. Tirrell of the California Institute of Technology, Rakesh Jain of Harvard, Robert Langer of MIT, and his former students Antonios Mikos of Rice University and Kristi Anseth of the University of Colorado). He has received honorary doctorates from the University of Ghent (Belgium, 1999), the University of Parma (Italy, 2000), the National and Kapodistrian University of Athens(Greece, 2000), the University of Ljubljana and the University of Patras (Greece, 2015) and an honorary professorship from Sichuan University (China, 2012).

He is president of the International Union of Societies for Biomaterials Science and Engineering (2008–2016). He has served as a director of the Biomedical Engineering Society (2008–2011), Chair of the College of Fellows of the American Institute of Medical and Biological Engineering (AIMBE, 2006–2007), President of the Society for Biomaterials (SFB, 2003–2004), president of the Controlled Release Society (CRS, 1987–1988), director of the American Institute of Chemical Engineers (AIChE, 1999-2002), chair of the engineering section of the American Association for the Advancement of Science (AAAS, 2014–15), chairman of the materials division of AIChE (1988–90) and director of the bioengineering division of AIChE (1994–97). Peppas was Editor of the leading biomaterials science journal Biomaterials from 1982 to 2002, an associate editor of the AIChE Journal, from 2009 to 2012, editor-in-chief of the Wiley/SFB Biomaterials Book Series (2006–2014), an associate editor of Biomedical Microdevices, a consulting editor of Pharmaceutical Research and an associate editor of the Cambridge University Press Biomedical Series.

He is an inaugural Fellow of the Biomedical Engineering Society, an inaugural Fellow of the Materials Research Society (MRS), an inaugural Fellow of the CRS, a founding Fellow of AIMBE, a Fellow of the American Chemical Society, a Fellow of the Royal Society of Chemistry (FRSC), Fellow of the Society for Biomaterials, a Fellow of the American Physical Society, a Fellow of the American Association of Pharmaceutical Scientists (AAPS), a Fellow of the American Institute of Chemical Engineers, a Fellow of the American Society for the Advancement of Science (AAAS), a Fellow of the American Society for Engineering Education (ASEE) and an Honorary fellow of the Italian Society of Medicine and Natural Sciences.

He has been a visiting professor at the University of Geneva, University of Paris-Sud (Orsay/Chatenay-Malabry), University of Parma, University of Pavia, University of Naples Federico II, Free University of Berlin, University of Santiago de Compostela, Complutense University of Madrid, Hoshi University, Tokyo, Hacettepe University, Ankara, National and Kapodistrian University of Athens, Hebrew University of Jerusalem, Nanyang Technological University, Singapore, and the California Institute of Technology.

Peppas is a leading scientist of modern drug delivery. He has helped to set the fundamentals and rational design of drug delivery systems and biomaterials over the past 39 years. He was the first to set the theories and equations that led to the design of a wide range of new systems. For example, using biomedical engineering principles and new biomedical transport theories, Peppas developed the equations that describe Fickian and non-Fickian diffusion of drugs, peptides and proteins in controlled release devices. The "Peppas equation" has become the standard method of analysis of pharmaceutical formulations or systems. His earliest work also led to the development of a number of swelling-controlled release devices for the release of small molecular weight drugs. Using the modeling similarities of phase erosion and state erosion, he developed a unified model for all drug delivery systems. Similarly, he developed the theoretical framework for the analysis of transport through crosslinked biomaterials (the Peppas-Reinhart theory), ionic hydrogels (the Brannon-Peppas theory), and gel-tissue interactions via tethers (the Huang-Peppas theory and the Sahlin-Peppas equation). For the profound impact of these theories and analyses, Peppas has been recognized as the most cited and highly published author in "drug delivery", "biomaterials and drug delivery", and "intelligent materials". He is listed as a Highly Cited Researcher^{SM} of Thomson Scientific and the Institute of Scientific Information. He has also ranked as the most cited chemical and biomedical engineer with 106,026 citations and an H-index of 152.

Applications of his theories and mathematical models have had a profound effect in the field. Peppas and his students originated the novel muco- and bioadhesive systems that interact molecularly with the mucus and tissue and have been able to prolong bioavailability of proteins and peptides in the blood. As a result of his work, a number of biomedical polymers and commercial delivery devices have been launched. Peppas was the first to develop novel toxic-free poly(vinyl alcohol) gels by the freezing-thawing technique in 1975. These gels became very successful articular cartilage replacement systems. In 1978, he developed the same systems for in situ replacement of vocal cords. In 1979 his group pioneered the use of hydrogels in drug delivery applications, including epidermal bioadhesive systems and systems for the release of theophylline, proxyphylline, diltiazem, and oxprenolol. Peppas' lab has developed new technologies of oral delivery systems for insulin and other proteins. These devices release insulin orally, "protecting" the insulin throughout its transport in the stomach, upper small intestine, and, eventually, blood, and bypassing diabetics' need for several daily injections. The same technology has been used for the transmucosal (oral, buccal) delivery of calcitonin (for treatment of osteoporosis in postmenopausal women) and interferon-alpha (for cancer therapy), and is being investigated for interferon-beta release for multiple sclerotic patients. Peppas was one of the pioneers of intelligent biomaterials, and medical devices. Using intelligent polymers as early as 1980, Peppas and his group were the first to use such pH-sensitive and temperature-sensitive systems for modulated release of streptokinase and other fibrinolytic enzymes.

Peppas has founded three companies: Mimetic Solutions, Appian Labs and CoraDyn Biosystems for the commercialization of various pharmaceutical products and medical devices. He is the author of 1,450 publications, and numerous proceedings papers and abstracts, with more than 80,000 citations and an H-index of 135. He is the coauthor or coeditor of 37 books, including the three-volume Hydrogels in Medicine and Pharmacy (CRC Press, 1987), the monograph Pulsatile Drug Delivery (WSGS, Stuttgart, 1993), two books on Biopolymers (Springer, 1994), the monograph Molecular and Cellular Foundations of Biomaterials (Academic Press, 2004), the book Intelligent Therapeutics: Biomimetic Systems and Nanotechnology in Drug Delivery (Elsevier, 2004), the monograph Nanotechnology in Therapeutics (Horizon Press, 2007) and the book Chronobiology and Drug Delivery (Elsevier, 2007).

== Awards ==
He has been awarded more than 150 national and international awards. These include:

- the BMEMat Lifetime Achievement Award Winner (2024)
- the Founders Award of the National Academy of Engineering (2012)
- the highest distinction from the American Institute of Medical and Biological Engineering (the Pierre Galletti Award (2008)) and the Pritzker Lecture (2016)
- the highest distinctions of the Society for Biomaterials (the Founders Award for Lifetime Contributions (2005), the William Hall Award for Service (2010) and the Clemson Award for Basic Research (1992))
- the Acta Biomaterialia Gold Medal (2010)
- the highest recognition from the Southeastern Universities Research Association (SURA Distinguished Scientist Award (2010))
- the International Award, European Society for Biomaterials (2015)
- the Giulio Natta Medal, from the Polytechnic School of Milan, Italy (2014)
- the highest research recognitions from the American Institute of Chemical Engineers (the Founders Award (2008), the 59th Institute Lecture (2007), the William Walker Award (2006)) as well as the Nanoscale Science and Engineering Award (2014), the Food, Pharmaceuticals and Bioengineering Award (1991) and the CMA Stine Materials Science and Engineering Award (1984)
- the Jay Bailey Award from the Society for Biological Engineering (2006)
- the Applied Polymer Science Award from the American Chemical Society (2014)
- the highest recognitions of the American Association of Pharmaceutical Scientists (the 2002 Dale E. Wurster Award in Pharmaceutics, and the 1999 Research Achievement Award in Pharmaceutical Technology)
- the highest recognitions of the Controlled Release Society (the 2015 Life Contributions CRS award, the 1991 Founders Award and the 2002 Eurand Award for Outstanding Contributions in Oral Drug Delivery)
- the highest recognition from the European Pharmaceutical Associations, APGI, APV and ADRITELF (the Maurice-Marie Janot Award, 2010)
- the highest recognitions of the American Society for Engineering Education (the 2013 Benjamin Garver Lamme Excellence in Engineering Education Award, the 2000 General Electric Senior Research Award recognizing the best engineering researcher of the USA), as well as the 1992 George Westinghouse Award recognizing the best teacher, the 1988 Curtis McGraw Award for best engineering research under the age of 40, and the 2006 Dow Chemical Engineering Award
- the 2002 Newsmaker of the Year Award of the American Chemical Society

In addition, he has received the highest scientific recognitions from both Universities with which he has been associated:

- the 2007 Career Excellence Research Award from the University of Texas at Austin (first engineer in the history of the award)
- the 2004 Hamilton Award for best paper from the University of Texas at Austin
- the 2002 Sigma Xi Award for Best Research from Purdue University
- the 2000 McCoy Award from Purdue University (second engineer in the 40-year history of the award)

In 2008 he was selected as one of the 100 Engineers of the Modern Era by the American Institute of Chemical Engineers. In 1991, the journal Polymer News recognized him as a polymer pioneer. Finally, in 2002, he was recognized as a biomedical pioneer by the IEEE Engineering in Medicine and Biology Society.

== Researchers under his supervision ==
Peppas has supervised more than 875 researchers, visiting scientists and graduate students including 100 PhDs, of which 54 are now professors in other universities. Many others have become leading biomedical scientists, engineers, physicians and medical professionals. Peppas' former students are affectionately called "peppamers". Among the numerous graduates from his laboratories, there are some of the leaders of drug delivery, biomaterials, bionanotechnology, polymer science and pharmaceutical sciences including the NAE, NAS and IOM member, and HHMI Investigator Kristi Anseth of the University of Colorado; the NAE/IOM member and Alpha Chi Sigma, BMES and SFB Clemson awards recipient Antonios Mikos of Rice University; the NAE member Richard Korsmeyer of Pfizer, the NAE member John Klier of the Dow Chemical Company; the AIChE Colburn, Wilhelm and SFB Clemson awards recipient Christopher Bowman of the University of Colorado; the Alpha Chi Sigma, the TR100 recipients Balaji Narasimhan of Iowa State University, Anthony Lowman of Rowan University and Surya Mallapragada of Iowa State University; the ACS polymer award recipient Alec Scranton of the University of Iowa, Robert Parker of the University of Pittsburgh, the Fulbright Scholars Christopher Brazel of the University of Alabama, Bruno Gander of ETH Zurich, Madeline Torres-Lugo of the University of Puerto Rico, Jürgen Siepmann of the University of Lille, France, Irma Sanchez of the Tecnologico de Monterrey, Mexico, Todd Gehr, Chief of Nephrology of the Virginia Commonwealth University, Dukjoon Kim of the Sung Kyun Kwan University of Korea, the AIChE ChE Practice award recipient Lisa Brannon of the University of Texas, Zach Hilt and Tom Dziubla of the University of Kentucky, the ASEE ChE and Keillor awards recipient Jennifer Sinclair Curtis Dean of Engineering of the University of California, Davis, Yanbin Huang of the Tsinghua University, Mark Byrne of Rowan University, Lisa Shieh of Stanford University Medical School, MyungCheon Lee of the Dongguk University of Korea, Eurand award recipient Ruggero Bettini of the University of Parma, Italy, Esmaiel Jabbari of the University of South Carolina, David Henthorn of Rose Hulman, Eric Dietz of Purdue University, Catherine Dubernet of the University of Paris-Sud, Jessica Guingrich of the medical school of the University of Illinois, Ebru Oral of the Harvard Medical School, Mara Lovrecich of the University of Padova, Hideki Ichikawa of the Kobe Gakuin University, Bumsang Kim of the Hongik University of Korea and Oya Sipahigil of the Marmara University of Istanbul, Sasa Baumgartner of the University of Ljubljana, Adam Ekenseair of Northeastern University, Amber Doiron of State University of New York at Binghamton, Tania Betancourt of Texas State University, Omar Fisher of Temple University, Mary Caldorera-Moore of Louisiana Tech University, and Carolyn Bayer of Tulane University. Four of the former students of Professor Peppas have been elected to the National Academy of Engineering (NAE), National Academy of Sciences (NAS), National Academy of Medicine (NAM), and National Academy of Inventors (NAI) - Kristi Anseth (NAS, NAE, NAM, NAI); John Klier (NAE); Richard Korsmeyer (NAE); Anthony Lowman (NAI); Antonios Mikos (NAE, NAM, NAI).

== Personal life ==
Nicholas Peppas is married to Lisa Brannon-Peppas, whom he met at Purdue University, where she was doing her Ph.D. in chemical engineering. They have two children, Katherine and Alexander. They reside in Austin, Texas. Peppas' extracurricular activities include writing about the history of chemical engineering, opera, history and other subjects. He has published books and review articles on the subject. His review of the Centennial of AIChE was published by the Chemical Heritage Foundation in August 2008. Peppas is also an avid record collector and author of biographies and monographs on opera. A book on the Greek tenor Vasso Argyris: The Great Greek Tenor of the Interwar Years was published in 2008.

He has also written numerous biographies on Greek opera singers including the tenor of La Scala Nicola Filacuridi (1924–2009), the soprano of the Paris Opera Elen Dosia (1913–2002), the celebrated Greek tenor Michael Theodore (1939–) who had a radio and record career in Germany, the lyric tenor Antonios Delendas (1902–1966), the celebrated Greek soprano of the Scala di Milano Rena Gary Falachi, (Rena Garyfallaki, 1920–), the bass Petros Hoidas (1914–1977), the tenor of the Vienna State Opera Petros Baxevanos (1904–1982), the tenor of the Lyric Opera of Athens Nikos Hatzinikolaou (1929–), the internationally known Greek singers Nicola Zaccaria (1923–2007), Nicola Moscona (1907–1975), Kostas Paskalis (1929–2007), Efthymios Mihalopoulos (1937–), and Pavlos Raptis (1938–) and many others.

== See also ==
- List of MIT alumni
- List of chemical engineers
- List of Greek Americans
- List of University of Texas at Austin faculty
