= Kristi Anseth =

American chemical engineer

Kristi S. Anseth
- Education: University of North Dakota-Williston, Purdue University, University of Colorado
- Spouse: Chris Bowman (m. 2003)
- Scientific career
- Fields: Chemical and Biological Engineering
- Workplaces: University of Colorado
- Doctoral advisor: Chris Bowman
- Website: www.colorado.edu/chbe/kristi-s-anseth

External videos
- “Bonfils Stanton Foundation 2015 Honoree: Kristi Anseth”
- “NAS Research Briefings: Kristi S. Anseth - Biomaterials as Synthetic Extracellular Matrices“

Kristi S. Anseth (born 1969) is the Tisone Distinguished Professor of Chemical and Biological Engineering, an Associate Professor of Surgery, and a Howard Hughes Medical Investigator at the University of Colorado at Boulder. Her main research interests are the design of synthetic biomaterials using hydrogels, tissue engineering, and regenerative medicine.

Anseth was elected as a member into the National Academy of Engineering in 2009 for pioneering the rational design of biomaterials for tissue engineering, drug delivery, and biosensing applications.

== Early life and education ==
Kristi Anseth grew up in Williston, North Dakota. She played on both the volleyball and basketball teams at the University of North Dakota-Williston, earning the honor of Academic All-American in her second year.

Kristi Anseth transferred to Purdue University where she began her research career as an undergraduate student in the lab of Nicholas A. Peppas, receiving her Bachelor of Science in Chemical Engineering in 1992. She obtained her PhD in 1994, working under Christopher N. Bowman, himself a former graduate student of Nicholas Peppas, at the University of Colorado.

== Career ==
After post-doctoral work with Robert Langer at Massachusetts Institute of Technology and Thomas Cech, Anseth became an assistant professor at the Department of Chemical and Biological Engineering at the University of Colorado Boulder in 1996. She currently leads the Anseth Research Group as the Tisone Distinguished Professor of Chemical and Biological Engineering. She serves on Purdue's College of Engineering Advisory Council.

Anseth is working at the intersection of materials science, chemistry and biology, studying natural and synthetic hydrogels and using biomaterials to create an extracellular matrix to support three-dimensional cell enculturation.

Anseth is developing photopolymers that will change from soft to hard in response to cues such as ultraviolet light, and then degrade predictably over time. Such materials could be used to for orthopedic repairs, functioning as a replacement for damaged areas of bone and then slowly being replaced by regrowth of natural material as the body heals. Her pioneering approach applies photopolymerization and photodegradation to enable precise control in space and time of hydrogels' structure and composition. This research involves fundamental investigations into the molecular dynamics of processes at the cell-biomaterial interface.

Anseth is also working on the tissue engineering of biomaterials for the replacement of cartilage and heart valves. By combining photopolymers and lab-grown cartilage her lab is creating living replacements for worn-out joints. The problem is more difficult than replacing bone because the cartilage in joints, unlike bone, does not have the ability to regrow.

She has published more than 250 papers and filed for at least 18 patents. She has been involved in editorial activities of journals including Biomacromolecules, Journal of Biomedical Materials Research — Part A, Acta Biomaterialia, Progress in Materials Science, Biotechnology and Bioengineering and Proceedings of the National Academy of Sciences of the United States of America. In September 2014, she was elected the Vice President/President-Elect of the Materials Research Society (MRS), serving as Vice President in 2015 and President in 2016.

== Awards and honors ==
In 1999, Anseth was named to the MIT Technology Review TR100 as one of the top 100 innovators in the world under the age of 35.

Kristi Anseth was the first engineer, male or female, to be selected as a Howard Hughes Medical Investigator. At age 40, she was the youngest member ever to be elected to both the National Academy of Engineering (2009) and the Institute of Medicine (2009). In 2013, she was also elected to the National Academy of Sciences. She shares the distinction of being a member of all three with chemical engineers Cato Laurencin, Robert S. Langer, Nicholas A. Peppas, Frances Arnold, and Rakesh K. Jain. As of 2015, she was also named to the National Academy of Inventors. She was elected to the American Academy of Arts and Sciences in 2019.

Other awards and honors include:

- 2024, VinFuture Prize, Special Prize for Women Innovators, For Advancement in Design of Polymeric Biomaterials and Methods for Biomedical Applications
- 2020, L'Oréal-UNESCO Awards for Women in Science
- 2016, Honorary Doctorate, Purdue University, College of Engineering
- 2015, Bayer Distinguished Lectureship, University of Pittsburgh
- 2015, Bonfils-Stanton Awards, Science and Medicine honoree
- 2013, James E. Bailey Award, Society for Biological Engineering
- 2012, Colorado Women's Hall of Fame
- 2012, Distinguished Engineering Alumni award, Purdue University
- 2009, Fellow of the Materials Research Society
- 2008, Clemson Award for Basic Research from the Society for Biomaterials
- 2005, Elizabeth Gee Award, University of Colorado
- 2004, Alan T. Waterman Award, National Science Foundation
- 2001, Outstanding Young Investigator Award, Materials Research Society.
