= David Edwards (engineer) =

American biomedical engineer

David A. Edwards
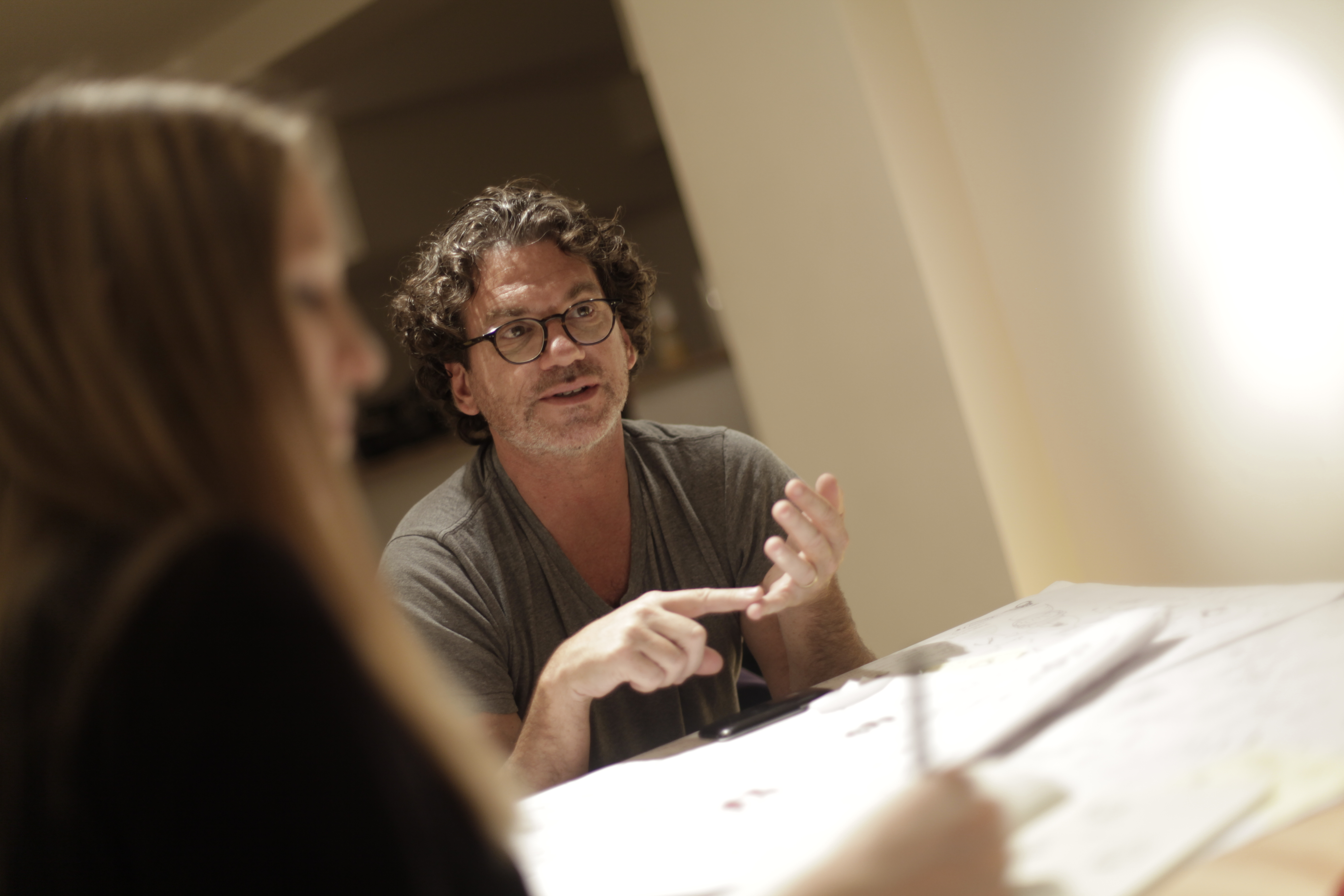
- Born: David A. Edwards; April 6, 1961; Ann Arbor, Michigan, US
- Education: Michigan Technological University, BS; Illinois Institute of Technology, PhD
- Scientific career
- Fields: Biomedical engineering
- Workplaces: Harvard University
- Website: davidideas.com

David A. Edwards (born April 6, 1961) is an American biomedical engineer, and the founder of Sensory Cloud. He was the Gordon McKay Professor of the Practice of Biomedical Engineering at Harvard University.

Edwards designs inhalable medicines, vaccines and victuals.

In 2001, Edwards was elected a member of the National Academy of Engineering for transfer of scientific principles of engineering to industry, including invention and commercial development of a novel, generic aerosol drug-delivery system.

== Education ==
Edwards studied chemical engineering, receiving a BS from Michigan Technological University in the field in 1983, and a PhD in 1987 from the Illinois Institute of Technology.

== Career ==
Between 1987 and 1995, Edwards held a postdoctoral and lectureship at the Technion in Israel and the Massachusetts Institute of Technology. While at MIT, Robert Langer, a professor at MIT, encouraged Edwards to develop an efficient way for inhalers to deliver medicine to the lungs. Edwards joined the Pennsylvania State University faculty as an Associate Professor of Chemical Engineering in 1995, where he continued to research ways to make medicine inhalable. In 1997, Science published his study on a new type of inhalable aerosol that efficiently delivered drugs to the lungs. Edwards left academia in 1998 when he and Langer founded Advanced Inhalation Research (AIR); the startup was purchased a year later by Alkermes for $114 million. He returned to academia in 2002, joining the Harvard faculty.

Edwards' scientific work in biomedical engineering concerns the research and development of drug delivery platforms for treating infectious diseases in the developing world. He was a founder of Advanced Inhalation Research, now part of Alkermes, Inc., of Pulmatrix, and of Medicine in Need, an international non-governmental organization aimed at developing new drugs and vaccines for diseases of poverty, such as tuberculosis.

In 2020, Edwards founded the company Sensory Cloud. Sensory Cloud released a nasal inhalable product intended to reduce infected air droplets from viruses like SARS-CoV-2, a strain of coronavirus known to cause COVID-19.

In a February 2021 study in the Proceedings of the National Academy of Sciences of the United States of America, Edwards and his colleagues posited that "exhaled aerosol increases with COVID-19 infection, age, and obesity".

== Le Laboratoire ==
In 2007, Edwards opened "Le Lab" as a space for artists, designers, scientists, and the general public to meet for exhibitions, performances, and discussions in Paris, and then he moved it to 650 East Kendall Street in the Kendall Square area of Cambridge, Massachusetts in 2014. Major exhibitions by artists such as Mark Dion and artist/engineer Chuck Hoberman were shown, as well as innovations developed by Edwards, his associates, and his students. Some of his food-related inventions were available for purchase at Cafe ArtScience, an innovative restaurant associated with Le Laboratoire Cambridge. In December 2019, it was announced that Cafe ArtScience was closing after 5 years of operation, and would be replaced by a new restaurant, called "Senses".

However, the COVID-19 pandemic disrupted these plans, and as of 2022, both the restaurant and Le Laboratoire Cambridge appear to be inactive or closed, either temporarily or permanently.

== Personal life ==
Edwards, his wife and three children have lived alternately in Boston and Paris.

== Publications ==
- Edwards, David; Cantor, Jay (2008). Niche. Harvard University Press. ISBN 9780674027909.
- Edwards, David (2009). Whiff. Harvard University Press. ISBN 9780674032866.
- Edwards, David (2010). ArtScience: Creativity in the Post-Google Era. Harvard University Press. ISBN 978-0674034648.
- Edwards, David (2010). The Lab: Creativity and Culture. Harvard University Press. ISBN 978-0-674-05719-7.
- Edwards, David (2019). Creating Things That Matter: The Art and Science of Innovations That Last. Picador. ISBN 978-1-250-23071-3.
- Edwards, D.A. (April 1994). "The macrotransport theory of nondepositing particles in the lung by convective dispersion". Journal of Aerosol Science. 25 (3): 533–565. doi:10.1016/0021-8502(94)90071-X.
- Edwards, D.A. (March 1995). "The macrotransport theory of lung dispersion: Aerosol deposition phenomena". Journal of Aerosol Science. 26 (2): 293–317. doi:10.1016/0021-8502(94)00101-4.
- Li, W. -I; Perzl, M.P.; Ferron, G.A.; Batycky, R.; Heyder, J.; Edwards, D.A. (September 1998). "The macrotransport properties of aerosol particles in the human oral-pharyngeal region". Journal of Aerosol Science. 29 (8): 995–1010. Bibcode:1998JAerS..29..995L. doi:10.1016/S0021-8502(97)10040-4.
- Edwards, D.A.; Chen, D.; Wang, J.; Ben-Jebria, A. (1998). "Controlled release inhalation aerosols". Resp. Drug Delivery VI: 187–192.
- Wang, J.; Ben-Jebria, A.; Edwards, D.A. (1999). "Inhalation of estradiol for sustained systemic delivery". Journal of Aerosol Medicine. 12 (1): 27–36. doi:10.1089/jam.1999.12.27. PMID 10351127.
- Tsapis, N.; Bennett, D.; Jackson, B.; Weitz, D.A.; Edwards, D.A. (September 2002). "Large porous carriers of nanoparticles for drug delivery". Proceedings of the National Academy of Sciences. 99 (19): 12001–12005. doi:10.1073/pnas.182233999. PMC 129387. PMID 12200546.
- Wong, Y-L.; Sampson, S.; Germishuizen, W.; Goonesekera, S.; Caponetti, G.; Sadoff, J.; Bloom, B.R.; Edwards, D.A. (February 2007). "Drying a tuberculosis vaccine without freezing". Proceedings of the National Academy of Sciences. 104 (8): 2591–2505. Bibcode:2007PNAS..104.2591W. doi:10.1073/pnas.0611430104. PMC 1815227. PMID 17299039.
