= Buddy Ratner =

American chemical and bioengineer (born 1947)

Buddy D. Ratner
- Born: January 19, 1947 (age 79); New York City, New York, U.S.
- Education: Brooklyn College; Polytechnic University of New York
- Known for: Biomaterials; Blood Compatibility; Biocompatibility
- Scientific career
- Fields: Bioengineering; Chemical Engineering
- Workplaces: University of Washington
- Doctoral advisor: Irving F. Miller
- Other academic advisors: Allan S. Hoffman

Buddy Ratner (born January 19, 1947, in New York City) is an American professor of chemical engineering and bioengineering. He is the director of the Research Center for Biomaterials at the University of Washington (University of Washington Engineered Biomaterials, UWEB). He is also the faculty member for the Program for Technology Commercialization at the University of Washington.

== Life ==
Ratner was born in 1947 in New York and in 1967 earned a BS degree in chemistry from Brooklyn College. Five years later, he earned his PhD from the Polytechnic Institute of Brooklyn with a thesis in the field of polymer chemistry. He then worked as a postgraduate student at the department of chemical engineering of the University of Washington before becoming a research assistant professor in 1975. He became a research associate professor four years later and an associate professor in 1984. From 1985 to 1996 he was director of the National ESCA and Surface Analysis Center for Biomedical Problems (NESAC / BIO), a research and service facility for surface analysis at the University of Washington. Since 1996 he has led the National Science Foundation-funded Research Center for Biomaterials at the University of Washington (University of Washington Engineered Biomaterials, or UWEB).

His research interests include the synthesis, modification and characterization of material surfaces for medical applications, Tissue Engineering and its application in the field of regenerative medicine, the synthesis and characterization of polymeric biomaterial ien and processes of the healing and inflammation associated with implants. He is co-author of over 300 scientific publications and co-editor of the 2004 second edition of the standard work "Biomaterials Science. An Introduction to Materials in Medicine". The International Union of Societies for Biomaterials Science and Engineering, the World Federation of Societies for biomaterial science, awarded him the title of 1996 Fellow of Biomaterials Science and Engineering. Ratner was elected a member of the National Academy of Engineering in 2002 for contributions to the understanding of the surface interactions of biological molecules and cells with medical implants.

== Works (selection) ==
- Surface Modification of Polymeric Biomaterials.Plenum Press, New York 1997
- Scanning Probe Microscopy of Polymers.American Chemical Society, Washington DC 1998
- Biomaterials Science. An Introduction to Materials in Medicine.Second Edition. Elsevier Academic Press, San Diego 2004

== Sources ==
- Ratner, Buddy. American Men & Women of Science. A Biographical Directory of Today's Leaders in Physical, Biological and Related Sciences.18th ed. Bowker, New Providence, 1992, ISBN 0-8352-3074-0, Volume 6, p. 63
