= Cato T. Laurencin =

American surgeon

Cato Thomas Laurencin
- Born: January 15, 1959 (age 67); United States
- Education: Princeton University (BSE); Harvard University (MD); Massachusetts Institute of Technology (PhD)
- Awards: National Medal of Technology and Innovation (2021); Spingarn Medal (2021); Hoover Medal (2021); Priestley Medal (2023)
- Scientific career
- Fields: Surgeon, professor, engineer, scientist
- Workplaces: University of Connecticut, University of Virginia
- Notable students: Helen H. Lu

Sir Cato Thomas Laurencin (born January 15, 1959) is an American engineer, physician, scientist, and professor of the University of Connecticut. He is also the chief executive officer of The Cato T. Laurencin Institute for Regenerative Engineering.

Laurencin is regarded as the founder of the field of Regenerative Engineering. He is the Editor-in-Chief of the journal Regenerative Engineering and Translational Medicine and Founder and president of the Regenerative Engineering Society. He is an elected member of the National Academy of Engineering, the National Academy of Medicine, the National Academy of Sciences, and the National Academy of Inventors. He is the first surgeon in history to be elected to all four academies, and is the first person to receive both the oldest/highest awards from the National Academy of Engineering (the Simon Ramo Founder's Award) and the oldest/highest National Academy of Medicine (the Walsh McDermott Medal).

Laurencin received the Philip Hague Abelson Prize, the highest honor of the American Association for the Advancement of Science, and the National Medal of Technology and Innovation, America's highest honor for technological advancement, awarded by President Barack Obama. Laurencin was bestowed Knight Commander of the Order of St. Lucia, under the auspices of King Charles III of England by the General Governor of Lucia for his outstanding service of national importance to Saint Lucia.

== Background and personal life ==
Laurencin was born and raised in the inner city of North Philadelphia. He is an alumnus of Central High School. He then earned a B.S.E. in chemical engineering from Princeton University. He earned an M.D., magna cum laude, from the Harvard Medical School, and received the Robinson Award for Surgery. Simultaneously he earned his Ph.D. in biochemical engineering/biotechnology from MIT, where he was named a Hugh Hampton Young Fellow. Laurencin and his wife have three children.

== Research ==
Laurencin's research includes biomaterials, polymeric materials science, nanotechnology, stem cell science, drug delivery systems, and regenerative engineering.

Laurencin has worked in the development of systems for soft tissue regeneration. He invented the Laurencin-Cooper ligament (LC ligament) for ACL regeneration, and engineered grafts for shoulder rotator cuff tendon repair and regeneration. National Geographic named the LC Ligament one of its "100 Scientific Discoveries that Changed the World" in 2012.

== Awards and honors ==
Laurencin received the National Institutes of Health NIH Director's Pioneer Grant Award and the National Science Foundation NSF Emerging Frontiers in Research and Innovation Grant Award, the agencies' highest grant awards for innovation and breakthrough research.

Laurencin is an Academician and Member (foreign) of the Chinese Academy of Engineering. He is a Fellow of the African Academy of Sciences, a Fellow of the World Academy of Sciences, a Fellow of the Indian National Academy of Sciences and a Fellow of the Indian National Academy of Engineering. In 2021, he was elected member of the U. S. National Academy of Sciences.

- 2027 – Recipient, ACS Award for Creative Invention, American Chemical Society (ACS). Will be presented at the ACS Spring National Meeting in New Orleans, March 2027
- 2026 – Recipient, Othmer Gold Medal, Science History Institute
- 2025 – Recipient, Blaise Pascal Medal, European Academy of Sciences
- 2025 – Recipient, Paul Terasaki Innovation Award, Terasaki Institute for Biomedical Innovation
- 2025 – Recipient, Dickson Prize in Medicine, University of Pittsburgh
- 2025 – Wallace H. Coulter Lecturer at Pittcon Conference
- 2025 – Knight Commander of the Order of St. Lucia – Auspices of King Charles III of England
- 2025 – Connecticut Magazine "Top Doctors" List – Connecticut Magazine/Castle Connolly
- 2024 – Gold Key Award – Sigma Xi Scientific Research Honor Society
- 2024 – Honorary Doctor of Science Degree – New York Institute of Technology
- 2022 – The Order of St. Lucia (St. Lucia Medal of Honor – Gold)
- 2021 – Recipient, Hoover Medal, AIChE / ASME / ASCE / AIME / IEEE
- 2021 – Recipient, Spingarn Medal, NAACP
- 2019 – Recipient, UNESCO-Equatorial Guinea International Prize for Research in the Life Sciences
- 2019 – Recipient, The American Association for the Advancement of Science Philip Hauge Abelson Prize 'for significant contributions to the advancement of science in the United States'
- 2016 – Laureate, National Medal of Technology and Innovation
- 2015 – Living Legend Award, National Medical Association
- 2014 – Percy Julian Medal, the highest honor of the National Organization of Black Chemists and Chemical Engineers (NOBCChe)

== Works in engineering ==
=== Chemical engineering ===
Laurencin is a professor of chemical and biomolecular engineering at the University of Connecticut. In chemical engineering, Laurencin was named one of the 100 Engineers of the Modern Era by the American Institute of Chemical Engineers for his work in pioneering polymer-ceramic systems for musculoskeletal use. A Fellow of the American Institute of Chemical Engineers, he won the William Grimes Award from the American Institute of Chemical Engineers and serves on the board of directors of the American Institute of Chemical Engineers with a term from 2018 to 2021. He is the Founder and president of the Regenerative Engineering Society, a community within the American Institute of Chemical Engineers, and is the Editor-in-Chief of Regenerative Engineering and Translational Medicine, published by Springer/Nature. He is the recipient of the James Bailey Award of the American Institute of Chemical Engineers and received the Percy Julian Medal, the highest award of the National Organization of Black Chemists and Chemical Engineers. He is a fellow of the American Chemical Society of polymeric science and engineering and chemistry. He was the recipient of the Founders Award by the AIChE in 2022. The AIChE created the Cato T. Laurencin Award for the American Regenerating Society.

=== Materials science and engineering ===
Laurencin is a professor of materials science and engineering at the University of Connecticut. In materials science and engineering, he is a Fellow of the Materials Research Society and has been the Fred Kavli Distinguished Lecturer and Plenary Speaker for the Materials Research Society. He is a fellow and life member of the American Ceramic Society and has delivered two of their most prestigious lectures. He has served as the Edward Orton, Jr., Memorial Lecturer and the Rustum Roy Lecturer for the American Ceramic Society. He has been named one of the most highly cited researchers in Material Science and Engineering (Scopus) and his work on engineered materials for soft tissue regeneration was highlighted by National Geographic magazine in its 100 Scientific Discoveries that Changed the World edition. He was awarded the 2020 Von Hippel Award from the Materials Research Society.

=== Biomedical engineering ===
Laurencin is a professor of Biomedical Engineering. His work has been honored at the White House, receiving the Presidential Faculty Fellow Award from President Bill Clinton. He is a Fellow of the International Academy of Medical and Biological Engineering. He is an International Fellow in Biomaterials Science and Engineering and a Fellow of the American Institute for Medical and Biomedical Engineering, and a Fellow of the Biomedical Engineering Society. His work was honored by Scientific American magazine as one of the "50 Greatest Achievements in Science" in 2007. In 2011, Laurencin was elected a member of the National Academy of Engineering for biomaterial science, drug delivery, and tissue engineering involving musculoskeletal systems, and for academic leadership.

Laurencin was named the 2009 winner of the Pierre Galletti Award, medical and biological engineering's highest honor. Laurencin is active in technology development. In 2012, his work in musculoskeletal tissue regeneration was featured in National Geographic magazine's "100 Discoveries that Changed Our World" edition.

In addition, he received the Technology, Innovation and Development Award from the Society for Biomaterials in 2013 for key scientific and technical innovation and leadership in translational research. In Connecticut, he was named Academic Entrepreneur of the Year by Connecticut Cure. He received the Connecticut Medal of Technology from the Connecticut Academy of Science and Engineering.

== Work in medicine ==
Laurencin is the Albert and Wilda Van Dusen Distinguished Endowed Professor of Orthopaedic Surgery at the University of Connecticut. He completed residency training at the Harvard Combined Orthopaedic Surgery Program, where he was Chief Resident in Orthopaedic Surgery at the Beth Israel Hospital, Harvard Medical School. He served as vice president for Health Affairs and Dean of the School of Medicine at the University of Connecticut. Previous to that, he served as the Lillian T. Pratt Distinguished Professor of Orthopaedic Surgery and Orthopaedic Surgeon-In-Chief at the University of Virginia Health System.

A board certified shoulder and knee surgeon, Laurencin has been named to "America's Leading Physicians" by Black Enterprise magazine. He has served as a ringside boxing physician and has been a physician for the USA Boxing men's elite team. He has been a member of the USA Boxing National Medical Advisory Board. Laurencin also serves as the Commissioner of Boxing for the state of Connecticut. Laurencin is a Fellow of the American Academy of Orthopaedic Surgeons, a Fellow of the American Orthopaedic Association, a Fellow of the American College of Surgeons, and a member of the American's Leading Doctors edition. He received the Nicolas Andry Award, the highest honor of the Association of Bone and Joint Surgeons. He is currently the only living orthopaedic surgeon elected to the American Academy of Arts and Sciences. He received an honorary degree from the Mount Sinai School of Medicine in 2018.

Laurencin received the 2021 Kappa Delta Ann Doner Vaughn Award from the American Society of Orthopaedic Surgeons.

He is the creator of the IDEAL path for achieving justice and equity.

== Work in equity and justice ==
Laurencin is active in mentoring, especially underrepresented minority students. In 2020, the Association of American Medical Colleges (AAMC) announced Laurencin as the recipient of the Herbert W. Nickens Award. The award was bestowed upon Laurencin for his groundbreaking work in social justice, equity and fairness.

He received the American Association for the Advancement of Science (AAAS) Mentor Award, the Beckman Award for Mentoring, and the Presidential Award for Excellence in Science, Math and Engineering Mentoring in ceremonies at the White House. The Society for Biomaterials established The Cato T. Laurencin, M.D., Ph.D., Travel Fellowship in his honor, given to underrepresented minority students pursuing research. He received an honorary degree from Lincoln University, one of the oldest historically Black colleges in the country.

Laurencin is an expert in public health, especially as it pertains to ethnic minority health and health disparities. Academically, he completed the Program in African-American Studies at Princeton University. He is a core faculty member of the Africana Studies Institute at the University of Connecticut, and is Editor-in-Chief of the Journal of Racial and Ethnic Health Disparities, published by Springer/Nature, a leading journal in the field. He has written landmark papers, including the first paper in the referred literature showing high levels of COVID-19 cases and deaths in Blacks. He has served as the Chair of the National Academy of Sciences Roundtable on Black Men and Black Women in Science, Engineering, and Medicine.

Laurencin co-founded the W. Montague Cobb/NMA Health Institute, dedicated to addressing racial health disparities, and served as its first chair of the board. He served on the board of trustees of the National Medical Association for over a decade and was Speaker of the House of Delegates of the National Medical Association. The W. Montague Cobb/NMA Health Institute created the Cato T. Laurencin Lifetime Achievement Award in his honor. It is bestowed at the opening ceremonies of the annual meeting of the National Medical Association.
