= Cuprophane =

Cuprophane is a membrane made of cellulose, commonly used for hemodialysis. Cuprophane is a synthetic non-biocompatible membrane. It has been associated with hemodialysis-associated amyloidosis.
