= Biomedical Engineering Society =

Professional association for biomedical engineers

The Biomedical Engineering Society (BMES) is the professional society for students, faculty, researchers and industry working in the broad area of biomedical engineering. BMES is the leading biomedical engineering Society in the United States and was founded on February 1, 1968 "to promote the increase of biomedical engineering knowledge and its utilization."

BMES serves as the lead Society and professional home for biomedical engineers, bioengineers and those in allied fields. BMES has more than 7,000 members in 2026, 115+ student chapters, and five Special Interest Groups (SIGs): Medical Devices, Cellular and Molecular Bioengineering, Advanced Biomanufacturing, Computational Biomedical Engineering, and BME and Women's Health.

== History ==
The BMES was first established in Illinois on February 1, 1968 as a non-profit organization that aims to serve the biomedical engineering students, academics, researchers, and professionals. Upon establishing the organization it first had 171 founding members and 89 charter members.

The BMES held its first meeting on April 17, 1968 with cooperation of the American Societies for Experimental Biology at the Ritz-Carlton Hotel in Atlantic City, NJ.

== Journals ==
Since 1972, the Society has published an academic journal, the Annals of Biomedical Engineering. This journal is an interdisciplinary, international journal that presents original and review articles in the major fields of bioengineering and biomedical engineering. The Society also publishes three other journals: Cellular and Molecular Bioengineering, Cardiovascular Engineering and Technology, and Biomedical Engineering Education.

== Annual meetings ==
The Biomedical Engineering Society (BMES) holds an annual meeting featuring scientific podium sessions, poster presentations, special sections, and lectures.

== Awards ==
BMES administers eight well-recognized annual prizes, including the Robert A. Pritzker Distinguished Lecture Award, which recognizes biomedical engineering achievement starting in 1991, the Athanasiou Medal of Excellence in Translational Bioengineering, and the Wallace H. Coulter Awards for Healthcare Innovation.

In addition, BMES grants its prestigious Fellows designation to a small list of select members who have demonstrated excellence in the field.

== BMES & ABET ==
The Biomedical Engineering Society (BMES) collaborates with ABET, an accreditor of programs in applied and natural sciences, computing, engineering, and engineering technology, to establish standards for biomedical engineering education.

== American Health Discovery ==
Biomedical engineers collaborate with scientists, physicians, and industry to develop technologies that detect disease, restore mobility, replace failing organs, and improve the quality and longevity of life. The public frequently recognizes the clinical outcomes but not the engineering that makes those technologies possible. BMES launched American Health Discovery, a national initiative to increase public awareness of biomedical engineering and its broad societal impact. Through patient-centric storytelling, educational outreach, and interdisciplinary collaboration, American Health Discovery demonstrates how engineering drives advances in healthcare while inspiring future innovators and strengthening public appreciation of the engineering profession.
