= List of members of the National Academy of Engineering (bioengineering) =

This list is a subsection of the List of members of the National Academy of Engineering, which includes members and international members of the United States National Academy of Engineering, living and deceased, each affiliated with one of the academy's disciplinary sections. Members are listed under their primary section, and each entry gives the person's name, primary institution, and election year. For deceased members, the year of death is noted.

== Bioengineering ==
Name	Institution	Year elected
John E. Abele	Boston Scientific	2023
Samuel Achilefu	The University of Texas Southwestern Medical Center	2025
Nancy Lynn Allbritton	University of Washington	2024
Harry R. Allcock	The Pennsylvania State University - University Park	2014
Paula Marques Alves	iBET, Instituto de Biologia Experimental e Tecnologica	2021
Daniel Matthew Ammon	Regenity Biosciences	2023
James Morley Anderson	Case Western Reserve University	2013
Juan Andres	Moderna Therapeutics	2022
Kristi S. Anseth	University of Colorado Boulder	2009
Michael V. Arbige	DuPont	2022
Aristos Aristidou	Texas A&M University	2018
Frances H. Arnold	California Institute of Technology	2000
Juan A. Asenjo	Centre for Biotechnology and Bioengineering, CeBiB, University of Chile	2018
Kyriacos Athens Athanasiou	University of California, Irvine	2025
Anne Hammons Aunins	Moderna Therapeutics	2026
John Grant Aunins	Janis Biologics	2021
David C. Auth	University of Washington	2009
Shorya Awtar	Parallel Robotics LLC	2023
James E. Bailey (died 2001)	ETH Zurich	1986
David Baker	University of Washington	2026
Earl E. Bakken (died 2018)	Medtronic, Inc.	1990
Stephane Bancel	Moderna Therapeutics	2024
Gilda A. Barabino	Olin College of Engineering	2019
Michael J. Barber	General Electric Company	2023
Harrison H. Barrett (died 2025)	University of Arizona	2014
Peter Joel Basser	National Institutes of Health	2020
James B. Bassingthwaighte (died 2022)	University of Washington	2000
Catia Bastioli	Novamont S.p.A	2025
Georges Belfort	Rensselaer Polytechnic Institute	2003
Milo C. Bell (died 1998)	University of Washington	1968
Rebecca M. Bergman	Gustavus Adolphus College	2010
Howard Bernstein	SQZ Biotechnologies	2014
Sangeeta N. Bhatia	Massachusetts Institute of Technology	2015
Rena Bizios	The University of Texas at San Antonio	2022
Harvey W. Blanch	University of California, Berkeley	2005
Cheryl R. Blanchard	Anika Therapeutics	2015
Arindam Bose	AbiologicsB, LLC	2017
Barbara D. Boyan	Virginia Commonwealth University	2012
Lisa Brannon-Peppas	PeppChem Consulting	2025
Charles R. Bridges Jr.	Corvista Health	2022
William R. Brody	Salk Institute for Biological Studies	2007
Emery Neal Brown	Massachusetts Institute of Technology	2015
J. H. U. Brown (died 2004)	University of Houston	1975
Barry C. Buckland	BioLogicB LLC	1997
Thomas F. Budinger	E. O. Lawrence Berkeley National Laboratory	1996
James William Burns	Ensoma	2010
Douglas C. Cameron	Independent Consultant	2025
Edwin L. Carstensen (died 2016)	University of Rochester	1987
Paul John Carter	Genentech	2022
Edmund Y.S. Chao	Johns Hopkins University	1998
Hongming Chen	Metis Therapeutics	2018
Simon R. Cherry	University of California, Davis	2016
Shu Chien	University of California, San Diego	1997
George M. Church	Harvard Medical School	2012
Paul Citron	Medtronic, Inc.	2003
Douglas S. Clark	University of California, Berkeley	2019
Leland C. Clark Jr. (died 2005)	Synthetic Blood International, Inc.	1995
Jennifer R. Cochran	Stanford University	2025
James J. Collins	Massachusetts Institute of Technology	2011
Charles L. Cooney	Massachusetts Institute of Technology	2025
Franklin S. Cooper (died 1999)	Haskins Laboratories	1976
Stuart L. Cooper	The Ohio State University	2011
Catherine Ford Corrigan	Exponent, Inc.	2021
Wallace Henry Coulter (died 1998)	Coulter Corporation	1998
Arthur J. Coury	Coury Consulting Services	2009
Patrick Couvreur	University of Paris-Saclay	2015
Stephen Corteen Cowin (died 2016)	City University of New York	2004
Harold G. Craighead	Cornell University	2007
Steven M. Cramer	Rensselaer Polytechnic Institute	2023
Jingrong Jean Cui	BlossomHill Therapeutics, Inc.	2024
Pieter Rutter Cullis	The University of British Columbia	2026
Leo C.M. de Maeyer (died 2014)	Max Planck Institute for Biophysical Chemistry	1998
Karl Deisseroth	Stanford University	2019
Scott L. Delp	Stanford University	2016
Tejal Ashwin Desai	Brown University	2024
Dennis E. Discher	University of Pennsylvania	2012
Jonathan S Dordick	Rensselaer Polytechnic Institute	2021
Jennifer A. Doudna	University of California, Berkeley	2026
Francis J. Doyle III	Brown University	2021
Stephen W. Drew	Drew Solutions LLC	1993
Floyd Dunn (died 2015)	University of Illinois Urbana-Champaign	1982
Howard D. Eberhart (died 1993)	University of California, Berkeley	1977
Lewis S. (Lonnie) Edelheit	GE Corporate Research and Development	1994
Elazer R. Edelman	Massachusetts Institute of Technology	2012
David A. Edwards	Harvard University	2001
Jennifer Hartt Elisseeff	Johns Hopkins University	2018
David Estell	Genencor Technical Center IFF	2025
Per Falholt	21st.Bio	2026
Peter C. Farrell	ResMed, Inc.	2012
Katherine Whittaker Ferrara	Stanford University	2014
Robert E. Fischell	ZyGood, LLC	1989
Stephen P.A. Fodor	13.8, Inc.	2009
Thomas J. Fogarty (died 2025)	Fogarty Institute for Innovation	2008
F. Stuart Foster	University of Toronto	2017
Xiaobing Fu	General Hospital of PLA	2021
Renato Fuchs (died 2015)	Independent Consultant	1994
Yuan-Cheng B. Fung (died 2019)	University of California, San Diego	1979
Martin Fussenegger	ETH Zurich	2017
Andrés Jose García	Georgia Institute of Technology	2021
Leslie A. Geddes (died 2009)	Purdue University	1985
George Georgiou	The University of Texas at Austin	2005
Tillman Ulf Gerngross	Adimab, LLC	2017
David B. Geselowitz (died 2020)	The Pennsylvania State University - University Park	1989
Ivar Giaever (died 2025)	Applied BioPhysics, Inc.	1975
Don Peyton Giddens	Georgia Institute of Technology	1999
Maryellen L. Giger	The University of Chicago	2010
James Gillin (died 2008)	Merck & Co., Inc.	1991
Gary H. Glover	Stanford University	2006
Steven A. Goldstein	University of Michigan	2005
John C. Gore	Vanderbilt University	2011
Chetan T. Goudar	Amgen, Inc.	2026
Wilson Greatbatch (died 2011)	Wilson Energy, LLC	1988
Linda Gay Griffith	Massachusetts Institute of Technology	2011
Patrick R. Gruber	Gevo, Inc.	2024
Farshid Guilak	Washington University in St. Louis	2022
Gary Steven Guthart	Intuitive Surgical Inc.	2026
Justin Hanes	Johns Hopkins University	2025
Latonia M. Harris	Johnson & Johnson Innovative Medicine	2020
David Haussler	University of California, Santa Cruz	2018
William A. Hawkins III	Immucor, Inc	2016
Adam Heller	The University of Texas at Austin	1987
J. David Hellums (died 2016)	Rice University	1998
Allan S. Hoffman (died 2023)	University of Washington	2005
Leroy E. Hood	Institute for Systems Biology	2007
Jiang Hsieh	GE Healthcare	2026
David Huang	Oregon Health & Science University	2023
Jeffrey Alan Hubbell	New York University	2010
Rik Huiskes (died 2010)	Eindhoven University of Technology	2005
Mark S. Humayun	University of Southern California Keck School of Medicine	2011
Michael W. Hunkapiller	Pacific Biosciences, Inc.	2008
Nola M. Hylton	University of California, San Francisco	2022
Mir A. Imran	InCube Labs, LLC	2017
Donald E. Ingber	Harvard University	2021
Omar Ishrak	Medtronic, Inc.	2020
Rakesh K. Jain	Harvard Medical School	2004
Kathrin U. Jansen	Pfizer Inc.	2022
Donald L. Johnson	Grain Processing Corporation	1993
Trevor O. Jones	International Development Corporation	1982
Abhay Joshi	Independent Consultant	2025
Willi A. Kalender (died 2024)	University of Erlangen–Nuremberg	2016
Roger D. Kamm	Massachusetts Institute of Technology	2023
David L. Kaplan	Tufts University	2021
Katalin Karikó	University of Szeged	2025
Kazunori Kataoka	The University of Tokyo	2017
Raphael Katzen (died 2009)	Independent Consultant	1996
Jay D. Keasling	University of California, Berkeley	2010
Kenneth H. Keller	University of Minnesota	2002
Brian D. Kelley	BK Biopharma Consulting	2016
Robert M. Kenedi (died 1998)	Independent Consultant	1976
Peter S. Kim	Stanford University	2016
Sung Wan Kim (died 2020)	University of Utah	2003
Albert I. King	Wayne State University	2000
Michael Laird King	University of Virginia	2026
Robert D. Kiss	UPSIDE Foods	2019
Alexander M. Klibanov	Massachusetts Institute of Technology	1993
Rob Knight	University of California, San Diego School of Medicine	2024
Willem J. Kolff (died 2009)	University of Utah	1989
Jindrich Henry Kopecek	University of Utah	2011
Richard Wilker Korsmeyer	Korsmeyer Consulting	2012
Joseph Kost	Ben-Gurion University of the Negev	2007
Maria-Regina Kula	Heinrich Heine University of Duesseldorf	2002
Michael R. Ladisch	Purdue University	1999
James Lago (died 2018)	Merck & Co., Inc.	1990
Christian J. Lambertsen (died 2011)	University of Pennsylvania	1977
Robert Samuel Langer	Massachusetts Institute of Technology	1992
Douglas A. Lauffenburger	Massachusetts Institute of Technology	2001
Cato T. Laurencin	University of Connecticut	2011
David M. Lederman (died 2012)	Abiomed	2002
Ann L. Lee	Prime Medicine, Inc.	2007
Raphael C. Lee	The University of Chicago	2013
Sang Yup Lee	KAIST (Korea Advanced Institute of Science & Technology)	2010
Kam W. Leong	Columbia University	2013
Mark J. Levin	Third Rock Ventures LLC	2002
Stephen M. Lewis	POET, LLC	2023
James C. Liao	Academia Sinica (Taiwan)	2013
Jefferson C. Lievense	Lievense Bioengineering LLC	2019
Edwin N. Lightfoot Jr. (died 2017)	University of Wisconsin-Madison	1979
Frances S. Ligler	Texas A&M University	2005
John H. Linehan	Northwestern University - Evanston	2006
Laurie Ellen Locascio	American National Standards Institute	2023
Nils Lonberg	Canaan Partners	2015
Ingemar Lundstrom	Linköping University	2011
Stacey Yuxin Ma	Gilead Sciences, Inc.	2026
Gargi Maheshwari	Bristol Myers Squibb Company	2024
Josh Makower	Stanford University	2021
Alfred E. Mann (died 2016)	MannKind Corporation	2001
Susan S. Margulies	Vanderbilt University	2020
Pamela Gail Marrone	Invasive Species Corporation	2024
John C. Martin (died 2021)	Gilead Sciences, Inc.	2008
Kiran Mazumdar-Shaw	Biocon Limited	2019
Larry V. McIntire (died 2026)	Georgia Institute of Technology	2001
Edward Wilson Merrill (died 2020)	Massachusetts Institute of Technology	2013
Antonios Georgios Mikos	Rice University	2012
Dane A. Miller (died 2015)	Independent Consultant	2000
Charles A. Mistretta	University of Wisconsin-Madison	2014
Samir Mitragotri	Harvard University	2015
David J. Mooney	Harvard University	2010
Van C. Mow	Columbia University	1991
Mary Pat Moyer	INCELL Corporation LLC	2019
Eugene F. Murphy (died 2000)	Independent Consultant	1968
Michael A. Mussallem	Edwards Lifesciences, LLC	2022
Kyle J. Myers	Puente Solutions LLC	2015
Robert M. Nerem (died 2020)	Georgia Institute of Technology	1988
William New Jr. (died 2017)	The Novent Group	2010
Jens Bredal Nielsen	BioInnovation Institute	2010
Laura Elizabeth Niklason	Humacyte Global Inc	2020
Milton Allen Northrup	Northrup Consulting Group	2013
Matthew O'Donnell	University of Washington	2009
Franklin F. Offner (died 1999)	Northwestern University - Evanston	1990
Bernhard O. Palsson	University of California, San Diego	2006
Eleftherios Terry Papoutsakis	University of Delaware	2018
P. Hunter Peckham	Case Western Reserve University	2002
Timothy J. Pedley	University of Cambridge	1999
Dan Peer	Tel Aviv University	2023
Norbert Joseph Pelc	Stanford University	2012
Nicholas A. Peppas	The University of Texas at Austin	2006
Parker H. "Pete" Petit	MiMedx Group, Inc	2011
Roderic Ivan Pettigrew	Texas A&M University	2010
Leonard Pinchuk	University of Miami	2012
Robert Plonsey (died 2015)	Duke University	1986
Victor L. Poirier (died 2025)	University of South Florida	2003
Priyaranjan Prasad	Prasad Consulting	2006
Kristala L. J. Prather	Massachusetts Institute of Technology	2025
Mark R. Prausnitz	Georgia Institute of Technology	2023
Edwin P. Przybylowicz	Eastman Kodak Company	1990
Judit E. Puskas	The Ohio State University	2023
Stephen R. Quake	Stanford University	2013
Nirmala Ramanujam	Duke University	2026
John Michael Ramsey	The University of North Carolina at Chapel Hill	2014
George B. Rathmann (died 2012)	Nuvelo, Inc.	1995
Buddy D. Ratner	University of Washington	2002
Rui Luis Reis	University of Minho	2016
James B. Reswick (died 2013)	U.S. Department of Education	1976
Rebecca R. Richards-Kortum	Rice University	2008
David K. Robinson	Gates Foundation	2022
Rodolfo R. Rodriguez	Advanced Animal Diagnostics	2016
Peter Bernard Roemer	GE Healthcare	2021
Howard B. Rosen	Stanford University	2005
Derrick Rossi	Convelo Therapeutics, Inc.	2024
Jonathan M. Rothberg	4Catalyzer	2004
Yoram Rudy	Washington University	2003
Murray B. Sachs (died 2018)	Johns Hopkins University School of Medicine	2002
Ann Beal Salamone	Rochal Industries, LLC	2016
Joseph C. Salamone (died 2019)	Rochal Industries, LLC	2011
W. Mark Saltzman	Yale University	2018
Ram Sasisekharan	Massachusetts Institute of Technology	2026
Amarpreet Singh Sawhney	Instylla Inc.	2020
David V. Schaffer	University of California, Berkeley	2025
Gabriel Schmergel	Genetics Institute, Inc.	1994
Geert W. Schmid-Schoenbein	University of California, San Diego	2005
Christine E. Schmidt	University of Florida	2024
Otto H. Schmitt (died 1998)	University of Minnesota, Minneapolis	1979
Albert B. Schultz (died 2020)	University of Michigan	1993
Jerome S. Schultz	University of Houston	1994
Herman P. Schwan (died 2005)	University of Pennsylvania	1975
Robert A. Scott	Alcon Laboratories, Inc.	2019
Michael Vivian Sefton	University of Toronto	2020
Michael R. Sfat (died 2012)	Bio-Technical Resources	1994
Moshe Shoham	Technion-Israel Institute of Technology	2014
Molly Shoichet	University of Toronto	2016
Michael L. Shuler	Cornell University	1989
John B. Simpson	Sequoia Hospital	2021
Richard Skalak (died 1997)	University of California, San Diego	1988
Darlene Joy Solomon	Agilent Technologies	2017
Willem P. C. Stemmer (died 2013)	Amunix Inc.	2012
Gregory Stephanopoulos	Massachusetts Institute of Technology	2003
Kenneth N. Stevens (died 2013)	Massachusetts Institute of Technology	1986
Molly Morag Stevens	University of Oxford	2019
Eric Swanson	PIXCEL Inc	2025
James R. Swartz	Stanford University	1999
Melody A. Swartz	The University of Chicago	2023
Esther S. Takeuchi	Stony Brook University	2004
Marc Barry Taub	Abbott Diabetes Care	2025
Charles A. Taylor Jr.	The University of Texas at Austin	2024
Leo J. Thomas (died 2011)	Eastman Kodak Company	1984
Arthur J. Tipton	Vulcan Gray	2021
David A. Tirrell	California Institute of Technology	2008
Mehmet Toner	Harvard University	2017
Susan Hajaran Tousi	Delfi Diagnostics	2018
Hardy W. Trolander (died 2013)	The Yellow Springs Instrument Company, Inc.	1992
Bruce J. Tromberg	National Institutes of Health	2024
Anthony P.F. Turner	Cranfield University	2006
Ghebre E. Tzeghai	Summit Innovation Labs	2014
Mathias Uhlén	KTH-Royal Institute of Technology	2013
Janeen Uzzell	National Society of Black Engineers	2025
Viola Vogel	ETH Zurich	2020
Henning E. von Gierke (died 2007)	Wright State University School of Medicine	1976
Gordana Vunjak-Novakovic	Columbia University	2012
David R. Walt	Harvard Medical School	2008
Daniel I. C. Wang (died 2020)	Massachusetts Institute of Technology	1986
Lihong Wang	California Institute of Technology	2018
Yulun Wang	Sovato	2011
Robert Stanton Ward	ExThera Medical Corporation	2018
John T. Watson	University of California, San Diego	1998
Watt W. Webb (died 2020)	Cornell University	1993
Sheldon Weinbaum	The City College of the City University of New York	1996
Paul B. Weisz (died 2012)	The Pennsylvania State University - University Park	1977
Jennifer L. West	University of Virginia	2016
Blake S. Wilson	Duke University Medical Center	2017
Savio L-Y. Woo	University of Pittsburgh	1994
Dean E. Wooldridge (died 2006)	TRW Inc.	1977
Changfu Wu	U.S. Food and Drug Administration	2025
Charles E. Wyman	University of California, Riverside	2022
James J. Wynne	IBM Thomas J. Watson Research Center	2015
Younan Xia	Johns Hopkins University	2026
Ioannis V. Yannas (died 2025)	Massachusetts Institute of Technology	2017
Miranda G.S. Yap (died 2015)	National University of Singapore	2006
Martin L. Yarmush	Rutgers, The State University of New Jersey, New Brunswick	2017
Jackie Y. Ying	King Faisal Specialist Hospital & Research Centre	2021
Paul G. Yock	Stanford University	2009
Ajit P. Yoganathan	Georgia Institute of Technology	2015
William D. Young	Blackstone Life Sciences	1993
Alejandro Zaffaroni (died 2014)	Alexza Pharmaceuticals, Inc.	1997
Fan-Gang Zeng	University of California, Irvine	2023
Elias Adam Zerhouni	OPKO Health, Inc.	2013
Xingdong Zhang	Sichuan University	2014
Weichang Zhou	MediLink Therapeutics	2026
