= William Howard Arnold =

William Howard Arnold may refer to:

- William Howard Arnold (general) (1901–1976), United States Army general
- William Howard Arnold (physicist), American nuclear physicist
- W. H. "Dub" Arnold (1935–2023), chief justice of the Arkansas Supreme Court

== See also ==
- William Arnold (disambiguation)
