= Andre Francis Palmer =

American chemical and biomolecular engineer

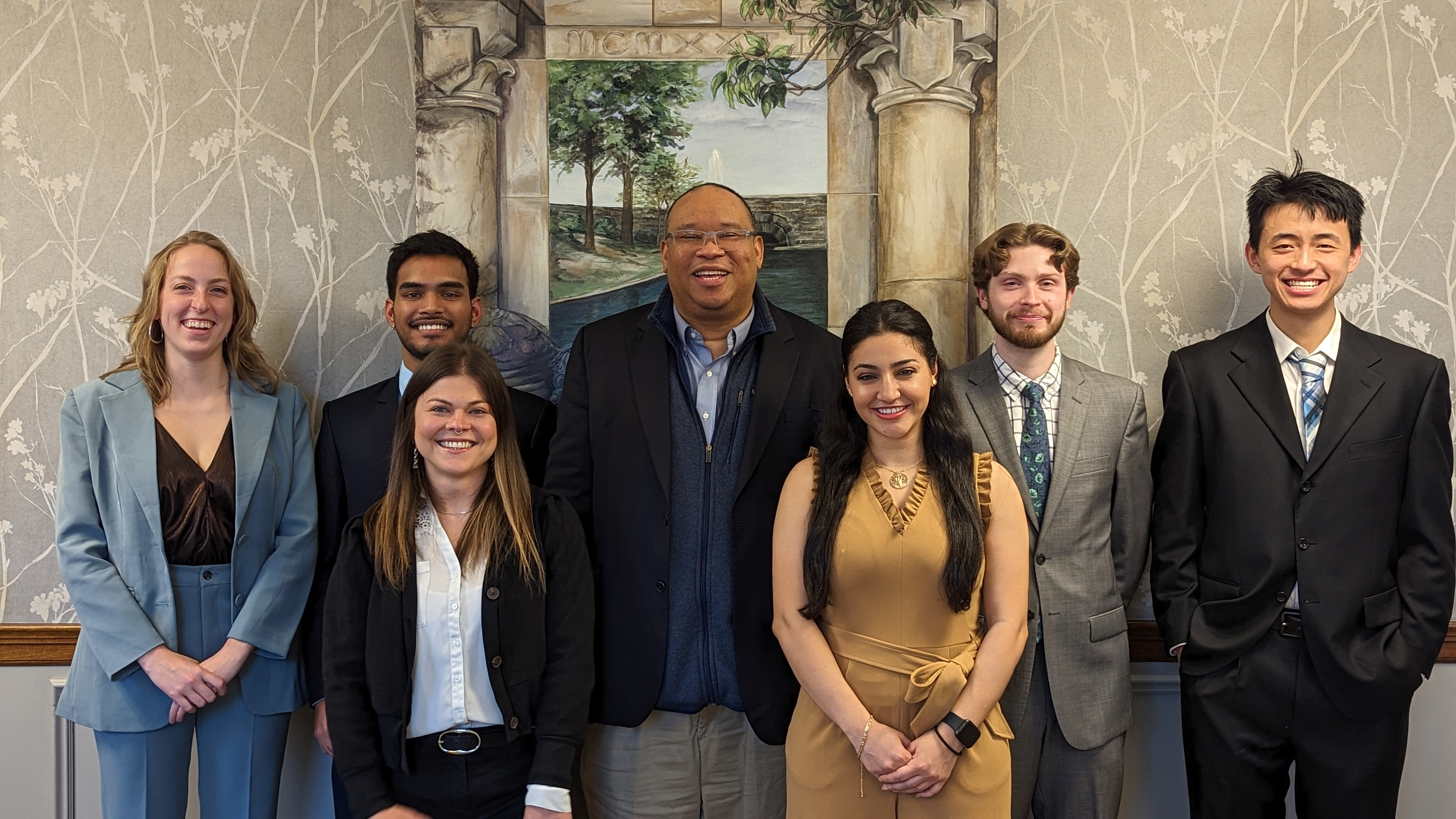
- Palmer with members of his lab
- Born: Port of Spain, Trinidad
- Education: Howard University (B.S.); Johns Hopkins University (Ph.D.)
- Awards: Fellow of the American Institute for Medical and Biological Engineering; Recipient of the National Science Foundation CAREER Award
- Scientific career
- Fields: Chemical engineering Biomolecular engineering
- Workplaces: Howard University, University of Notre Dame, Ohio State University
- Doctoral advisor: Denis Wirtz (Ph.D.)
- Website: cbe.osu.edu/people/palmer.351

Andre Francis Palmer is an American engineer who is the Associate Dean for research in the College of Engineering and the Fenburr Ohio Eminent Scholar and Professor of Chemical and Biomolecular Engineering at Ohio State University. He is an expert on hemoglobin-based oxygen carriers and biomaterials used in transfusion medicine.

== Biography ==
Palmer was born in Port of Spain on the twin island Republic of Trinidad and Tobago. He is fluent in English and became a U.S. citizen. Palmer earned a chemical engineering degree at Howard University in Washington D.C in 1993 and his doctorate in chemical and biomolecular engineering at Johns Hopkins University in 1998.

After completing postdoctoral work at Johns Hopkins University in 1999, Palmer joined the Chemistry Department faculty at Howard University. In 2001, he left for the University of Notre Dame to become assistant professor of chemical and biomolecular engineering. In 2006, after five years, he moved to Ohio State University to become associate professor of chemical and biomolecular engineering, and was promoted to full professor in 2012. He served as interim department chair in 2014–2015. In 2015, he was named Chair of the William G. Lowrie Department of Chemical and Biomolecular Engineering and served until 2019.

In March 2020, the Ohio Board of Regents named Palmer, "Ohio Eminent Scholar," a statewide endowed chair. In August 2021, Palmer was appointed Associate Dean for research, charged with directing the College of Engineering's $138 million research enterprise.

=== Awards and distinctions ===
As of 2022, Palmer has four active RO1's from the National Institutes of Health for bioengineering research projects. He has multiple collaborations from research labs across the U.S.

In 2021, Palmer received the Gaden Award from the Biotechnology & Bioengineering (journal) in recognition for a truly outstanding paper.

In 2015, Palmer was inducted fellow of the American Institute for Medical and Biological Engineering "for pioneering advances in engineering novel hemoglobin-based oxygen carriers for use as red blood cell substitutes in transfusion medicine."

In 2008, Palmer received the Lloyd Noel Ferguson Young Scientist award from the National Organization for the Professional Advancement of Chemists and Chemical Engineers (NOBCHE).

In 2001, Palmer was a recipient of the National Science Foundation CAREER Award for "engineering artificial cells.”

== Research ==
Bridging the fields of chemical engineering, biochemistry, and biomaterials, Palmer's research focuses on the biophysical properties of hemoglobin, blood and plasma substitutes, and novel methods in protein purification, including interactions between adjacent cells

Palmer currently holds several patents on his work.

Hemoglobin-based oxygen carriers (HBOCs)

Palmer's lab identifies new ways to build HBOCs. Their design strategy focus on increasing the molecular diameter of HBOCs so they're unable to traverse across blood vessel walls into the tissue space and limit negative side-effects. Supporting Publications:

- 2020, A. T. Williams, C. R. Muller, A. M. Eaker, D. A. Belcher, C. Bolden-Rush, A. F. Palmer, P. Cabrales, “Polymerized hemoglobin with increased molecular size reduces toxicity in healthy guinea pigs,” ACS Applied Bio Materials Apr 14 3, 5:2976–2985.
- 2020, A. T. Williams, A. Lucas, C. R. Muller, C. Bolden-Rush, A. F. Palmer, P. Cabrales, “Balance between oxygen transport and blood rheology during resuscitation from hemorrhagic shock with polymerized hemoglobin,” Journal of Applied Physiology Jul 1;129(1):97-107.
- 2021, C. R. Muller, A. Lucas, V. Courelli, A. T. Williams, F. Dos Santos, C. Cuddington, S. Moses, A. F. Palmer, E. Kistler, P. Cabrales, “Resuscitation from hemorrhagic shock after traumatic brain injury with polymerized hemoglobin,” Scientific Reports Jan 28;11(1):2509.

Facilitated oxygen transport

Palmer's research focuses on approaches to better improve oxygen storage and transport to cultured cells, especially cells grown in bioreactors. Supporting Publications:

- 2017, D. A. Belcher, U. Banerjee, C. M. Baehr, K. E. Richardson, P. Cabrales, F. Berthiaume, A. F. Palmer, “Mixtures of tense and relaxed state polymerized human hemoglobin regulate oxygen affinity and tissue construct oxygenation,” PLoS One Oct 11;12(10):e0185988.
- 2020, L. Diaz-Starokozheva, D. Das, X. Gu, J. T. Moore, L. R. Lemmerman, I. Valerio, H. M. Powell, N. Higuita-Castro, M. R. Go, A. F. Palmer, D. Gallego-Perez, “Early intervention on ischemic tissue with oxygen nanocarriers enables successful implementation of restorative cell therapies,” Cellular and Molecular Bioengineering May 29;13(5):435-446.
- 2020, D. A. Belcher, A. Lucas, P. Cabrales, A. F. Palmer, “Tumor vascular status controls oxygen delivery facilitated by infused polymerized hemoglobins with varying oxygen affinity,” PLOS Computational Biology Aug 20;16(8):e1008157.

Plasma substitutes

Palmer's lab demonstrated that human serum albumin (PolyHSA) is able to resuscitate animals from hemorrhagic shock, endotoxemia, sepsis, and ischemia reperfusion injury. Supporting publications:

- 2014, C. Castro, D. Ortiz, A. F. Palmer, P. Cabrales, “Hemodynamics and tissue oxygenation after hemodilution with ultrahigh molecular weight polymerized albumin” Minerva Anestesiologica 80: 537-546
- 2021, D. A. Belcher, A. T. Williams, A. F. Palmer, P. Cabrales, “Polymerized albumin restores impaired hemodynamics in endotoxemia and polymicrobial sepsis,” Scientific Reports May 25;11(1):10834.
- 2021, D. A. Belcher, A. T. Williams, C. Walser, C. R. Muller, C. J. Munoz, A. F. Palmer, P. Cabrales, “Attenuating ischemia and reperfusion injury with polymerized albumin,” Journal of Applied Physiology Dec 16.

Detoxification of Hemoglobin(Hb), Heme and Iron

Palmer's lab developed a hemopexin mimetic apohemoglobin (apoHb) that can scavenge heme, and when bound to Hp as the apoHb-Hp complex can scavenge and detoxify both heme and cell-free Hb. Supporting Publications:

- 2020, I. S. Pires, D. A. Belcher, R. Hickey, C. Miller, A. K. Badu-Tawiah, J. H. Baek, P. W. Buehler, A. F. Palmer, “Novel manufacturing method for producing apohemoglobin and its biophysical properties,” Biotechnology and Bioengineering Jan;117(1):125-145.
- 2020, I. S. Pires, A. F. Palmer, “Tangential flow filtration of haptoglobin,” Biotechnology Progress Sep;36(5):e3010.
- 2020, C. J. Munoz, I. S. Pires, J. H. Baek, P. W. Buehler, A. F. Palmer, P. Cabrales, “A novel apo-hemoglobin-haptoglobin complex attenuates the pathobiology of circulating acellular hemoglobin and heme,” American Journal of Physiology Heart and Circulatory Physiology May 1;318(5):H1296-H1307.

== Publications ==
Palmer has published over 150 peer-reviewed articles in Neuron, Transfusion Medicine, Public Library of Science, Annual Review Biomed Eng, Langmuir, Lab On A Chip, Shock, Experimental Hematology, Journal of Clinical Investigation, Science Reports, and Journal of Applied Physiology.

Palmer's research portfolio is among the "top 2% of highly-cited scientists" in the world
