= Lievense =

Lievense is a surname. Notable people with the surname include:

- Cornelis Lievense (1890–1949), Dutch businessman based in the US
- Jefferson C. Lievense (fl. 1976), American bioengineer
