= Frances Arnold =

American chemist and academic (born 1956)

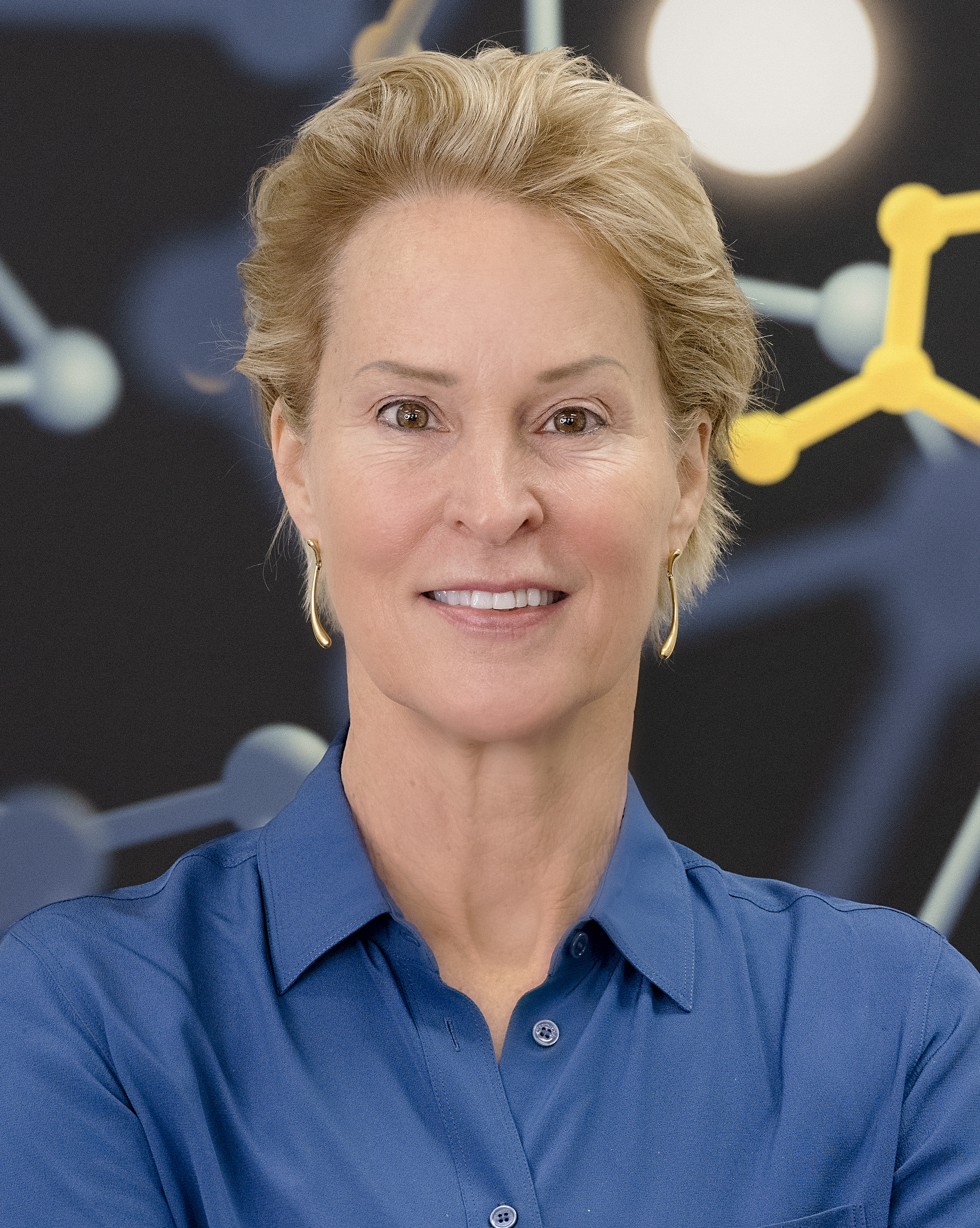
- Arnold in 2021

Co-Chair of the President's Council of Advisors on Science and Technology
- Incumbent
- Assumed office January 20, 2021 Serving with Maria Zuber and Francis Collins
- President: Joe Biden
- Preceded by: Position established

Personal details
- Born: Frances Hamilton Arnold; July 25, 1956 (age 70) Edgewood, Pennsylvania, U.S.
- Spouse: Jay Bailey (m. 1987; div. 1991)
- Domestic partner: Andrew E. Lange (1994–2010)
- Children: 3
- Education: Princeton University (BS); University of California, Berkeley (MS, PhD)
- Awards: Garvan–Olin Medal (2005); FASEB Excellence in Science Award (2007); Draper Prize (2011); National Medal of Technology and Innovation (2013); National Inventors Hall of Fame (2014); Millennium Technology Prize (2016); Sackler Prize in Convergence Research (2017); Nobel Prize in Chemistry (2018)
- Scientific career
- Fields: Chemical engineering Bioengineering; Biochemistry
- Workplaces: California Institute of Technology
- Thesis: Design and Scale-Up of Affinity Separations (1985)
- Doctoral advisor: Harvey Blanch
- Doctoral students: Christopher Voigt; Huimin Zhao

Frances Hamilton Arnold (born July 25, 1956) is an American chemical engineer and Nobel Laureate. She is the Linus Pauling Professor of Chemical Engineering, Bioengineering and Biochemistry at the California Institute of Technology (Caltech). In 2018, she was awarded the Nobel Prize in Chemistry for pioneering the use of directed evolution to engineer enzymes.

In 2019, Alphabet Inc. announced that Arnold had joined its board of directors. For the length of his presidency, she also served as an external co-chair of President Joe Biden's Council of Advisors on Science and Technology (PCAST).

== Early life and education ==
Arnold is the daughter of Josephine Inman (née Routheau) and nuclear physicist William Howard Arnold, and the granddaughter of Lieutenant General William Howard Arnold. She has an older brother, Bill, and three younger brothers, Edward, David and Thomas. She grew up in the Pittsburgh suburb of Edgewood, and the Pittsburgh neighborhoods of Shadyside and Squirrel Hill, graduating from the city's Taylor Allderdice High School in 1974. As a high schooler, she hitchhiked to Washington, D.C., to protest the Vietnam War and lived on her own, working as a cocktail waitress at a local jazz club and a cab driver.

The same independence that drove Arnold to move out of her childhood home as a teenager also led to a large volume of absences from school and low grades. In spite of this, she made near perfect scores on standardized tests and was determined to attend Princeton University, the alma mater of her father. She applied as a mechanical engineering major and was accepted. Arnold's motivation behind studying engineering, as stated in her Nobel Prize interview, was that "[mechanical engineering] was the easiest option and the easiest way to get into Princeton University at the time and I never left".

Arnold graduated in 1979 with a Bachelor of Science (BS) degree in mechanical and aerospace engineering from Princeton University, where she focused on solar energy research. In addition to the courses required for her major, she took classes in economics, Russian, and Italian, and envisioned herself as becoming a diplomat or CEO, even considering getting an advanced degree in international affairs. She took a year off from Princeton after her second year to travel to Italy and work in a factory that made nuclear reactor parts, then returned to complete her studies. Back at Princeton, she began studying at its Center for Energy and Environmental Studies – a group of scientists and engineers, at the time led by Robert Socolow, working to develop sustainable energy sources, a topic that would become a focus of her later work.

After graduating from Princeton in 1979, Arnold worked as an engineer in South Korea and Brazil and at Colorado's Solar Energy Research Institute. At the Solar Energy Research Institute (now the National Renewable Energy Laboratory), she worked on designing solar energy facilities for remote locations and helped write United Nations (UN) position papers.

She then enrolled at the University of California, Berkeley, where she earned a PhD degree in chemical engineering in 1985 and became deeply interested in biochemistry. Her thesis work, carried out in the lab of Harvey Warren Blanch, investigated affinity chromatography techniques. Arnold had no chemistry background before pursuing a doctorate in chemical engineering. For the first year of her Ph.D. coursework, the graduate committee at UC Berkeley required that she take undergraduate chemistry courses.

== Career ==
After earning her Ph.D., Arnold completed postdoctoral research in biophysical chemistry at Berkeley. In 1986, she joined the California Institute of Technology as a visiting associate. She was promoted to assistant professor in 1986, associate professor in 1992, and full professor in 1996. She was named the Dick and Barbara Dickinson Professor of Chemical Engineering, Bioengineering and Biochemistry in 2000 and the Linus Pauling Professor of Chemical Engineering, Bioengineering and Biochemistry in 2017. In 2013, she was appointed director of Caltech's Donna and Benjamin M. Rosen Bioengineering Center.

Arnold served on the Science Board for the Santa Fe Institute from 1995 to 2000. She was a member of the Advisory Board of the Joint BioEnergy Institute. Arnold chairs the Advisory Panel of the Packard Fellowships in Science and Engineering. She served on the President's Advisory Council of the King Abdullah University of Science and Technology (KAUST). She served as a judge for The Queen Elizabeth Prize for Engineering and worked with the National Academy of Science's Science & Entertainment Exchange to help Hollywood screenwriters accurately portray science topics.

In 2000 Arnold was elected a member of the National Academy of Engineering for integration of fundamentals in molecular biology, genetics, and bioengineering to the benefit of life science and industry.

She is co-inventor on over 40 US patents. She co-founded Gevo, Inc., a company to make fuels and chemicals from renewable resources in 2005. In 2013, she and two of her former students, Peter Meinhold and Pedro Coelho, cofounded a company called Provivi to research alternatives to pesticides for crop protection. She has been on the corporate board of the genomics company Illumina Inc. since 2016.

In 2019 she was named to the board of Alphabet Inc., making Arnold the third woman director of the Google parent company.

In January 2021 she was named an external co-chair of President Joe Biden's Council of Advisors on Science and Technology (PCAST). She worked with Biden's transition team to help identify scientists for roles in the administration. She described her main job as helping choose PCAST's additional members and to get to work setting a scientific agenda for the group. She has stated: "We have to reestablish the importance of science in policymaking, in decision making across the government. We need to reestablish the trust of the American people in science ... I think that PCAST can play a beneficial role in that."

Arnold serves on the Board of Advisors for Angeleno Group, a private equity and venture capital firm focused on sustainable energy investments.

=== Research ===
Arnold is credited with pioneering the use of directed evolution to create enzymes (biochemical molecules—often proteins—that catalyze, or speed up, chemical reactions) with improved and/or novel functions. The directed evolution strategy involves iterative rounds of mutagenesis and screening for proteins with improved functions and it has been used to create useful biological systems, including enzymes, metabolic pathways, genetic regulatory circuits, and organisms. In nature, evolution by natural selection can lead to proteins (including enzymes) well-suited to carry out biological tasks, but natural selection can only act on existing sequence variations (mutations) and typically occurs over long time periods. Arnold speeds up the process by introducing mutations in the underlying sequences of proteins; she then tests these mutations' effects. If a mutation improves the proteins' function she can keep iterating the process to optimize it further. This strategy has broad implications because it can be used to discover proteins for a wide variety of applications. For example, she has used directed evolution to discover enzymes that can convert sugars directly into iso-butanol, a precursor for many important substances and which can also be used to produce renewable fuels and pharmaceutical compounds.

To effect the directed evolution, Arnold introduces mutations in specific areas of the protein that she has selected based on her knowledge of biochemistry. It is this selected application of mutations that differentiates this method from random mutations and which thus accelerates the development of molecules with desired effects.

Arnold applied directed evolution to the optimization of enzymes (although not the first person to do so, see e.g. Barry Hall). In her seminal work, published in 1993, she used the method to engineer a version of subtilisin E that was active in the organic solvent DMF, a highly unnatural environment. She carried out the work using four sequential rounds of mutagenesis of the enzyme's gene, expressed by bacteria, through error-prone PCR. After each round she screened the enzymes for their ability to hydrolyze the milk protein casein in the presence of DMF by growing the bacteria on agar plates containing casein and DMF. The bacteria secreted the enzyme and, if it were functional, it would hydrolyze the casein and produce a visible halo. She selected the bacteria that had the biggest halos and isolated their DNA for further rounds of mutagenesis. Using this method, she discovered an enzyme that had 256 times more activity in DMF than the original.

She has further developed her methods and applied them under different selection criteria in order to optimize enzymes for different functions. She showed that, whereas naturally evolved enzymes tend to function well at a narrow temperature range, enzymes could be produced using directed evolution that could function at both high and low temperatures. In addition to improving the existing functions of natural enzymes, Arnold has discovered enzymes that perform functions for which no previous specific enzyme existed, such as when she evolved cytochrome P450 to carry out cyclopropanation and carbene and nitrene transfer reactions.

In addition to evolving individual molecules, she has used directed evolution to co-evolve enzymes in biosynthetic pathways, such as those involved in the production of carotenoids and L-methionine in Escherichia coli (which has the potential to be used as a whole-cell biocatalyst). For example, she evolved bacteria to produce isobutanol; it can be produced in E. coli bacteria, but the production pathway requires the cofactor NADPH, whereas E. coli makes the cofactor NADH. To circumvent this problem, she evolved the enzymes in the pathway to use NADH instead of NADPH, allowing for the production of isobutanol.

She uses structure-guided protein recombination to combine parts of different proteins to form protein chimeras with unique functions. She developed computational methods, such as SCHEMA, to predict how the parts can be combined without disrupting their parental structure, so that the chimeras will fold properly, and then applies directed evolution to further mutate the chimeras to optimize their functions.

At Caltech, Arnold runs a laboratory that continues to study directed evolution and its applications in environmentally-friendly chemical synthesis and green/alternative energy, including the development of highly active enzymes (cellulolytic and biosynthetic enzymes) and microorganisms to convert renewable biomass to fuels and chemicals. A paper published in Science in 2019, with Inha Cho and Zhi-Jun Jia, was retracted on January 2, 2020, as the results were found to be not reproducible.

As of 2024, Arnold has an h-index of 147 according to Google Scholar.

== Personal life ==
Arnold lives in La Cañada Flintridge, California. She was married to James E. Bailey from 1987 to 1991, who died of cancer in 2001. The couple had James Howard Bailey (born in 1990). Her stepson Sean Bailey is an American film and television producer. He has been the president of Walt Disney Studios Motion Picture Production since his appointment in 2010. Arnold was herself diagnosed with breast cancer in 2005 and underwent treatment for 18 months.

Arnold was in a common-law marriage with Caltech astrophysicist Andrew E. Lange, beginning in 1994, and they had two sons, William Andrew Lange (1995) and Joseph Inman Lange (1997). Lange committed suicide in 2010 and one of their sons, William Lange-Arnold, died in an accident in 2016. Her father, William Howard Arnold died in 2015.

Her hobbies include traveling, scuba diving, skiing, dirt-bike riding, and hiking.

== Honors and awards ==
Arnold's work has been recognized by many awards, including the 2018 Nobel Prize in Chemistry, the 2011 National Academy of Engineering (NAE) Draper Prize (the first woman to receive it), and a 2011 National Medal of Technology and Innovation. She was elected to the American Academy of Arts and Sciences in 2011 and inducted into the National Inventors Hall of Fame in 2014. She was the first woman to be elected to all three National Academies in the United States – the National Academy of Engineering (2000), the National Academy of Medicine, formerly called the Institute of Medicine (2004), and the National Academy of Sciences (2008).

Arnold is a Fellow of the American Association for the Advancement of Science, the American Academy of Arts and Sciences, the American Academy of Microbiology, the American Institute for Medical and Biological Engineering, International Fellow of the UK's Royal Academy of Engineering in 2018 and Fellow of the American Chemical Society.

In 2016 she became the first woman to win the Millennium Technology Prize, which she won for pioneering directed evolution. In 2017, Arnold was awarded the Raymond and Beverly Sackler Prize in Convergence Research by the National Academy of Sciences, which recognizes extraordinary contributions to convergence research.

In 2018 she was awarded the Nobel Prize in Chemistry for her work in directed evolution, making her the fifth woman to receive the award in its 117 years of existence, and the first American woman. She received a one-half share of the award, with the other half jointly awarded to George Smith and Gregory Winter "for the phage display of peptides and antibodies." She is the first woman graduate of Princeton to be awarded a Nobel Prize and the first person who got their undergraduate degree from Princeton (man or woman) to receive a Nobel Prize in one of the natural sciences categories (chemistry, physics, and physiology or medicine). In November 2018, she was listed as one of BBC's 100 Women. On October 24, 2019, Pope Francis named her a member of the Pontifical Academy of Sciences. In 2022 she was the guest in an episode of The Life Scientific on BBC Radio 4.

- Elected Fellow of the American Chemical Society (2025)
- ACS Priestley Medal (2025)
- Perkin Medal (2023)
- Honorary degree of Doctor of Science from the University of Oxford (2023)
- Foreign Member of the Royal Society (2020)
- Honorary doctorate, Technical University of Denmark (2019)
- Nobel Prize in Chemistry (2018)
- Elected to the American Philosophical Society (2018)
- Elected an International Fellow of the Royal Academy of Engineering (2018)
- Raymond and Beverly Sackler Prize in Convergence Research (2017)
- Spiegelman Lecture, University of Illinois (2017)
- Society of Women Engineers' 2017 Achievement Award
- Honorary Degree of Doctor of Science from Dartmouth College (2017)
- Honorary doctorate, University of Chicago (2016)
- Millennium Technology Prize (2016)
- Honorary degree of Doctor of Science from the ETH Zurich (2015)
- Elmer Gaden Award, Biotechnology and Bioengineering (2015)
- Inducted into the National Inventors Hall of Fame (2014)
- Golden Plate Award, American Academy of Achievement (2014)
- Emanuel Merck Lectureship (2013)
- ENI Prize in Renewable and Nonconventional Energy (2013)
- Honorary Degree of Doctor of Science from the Stockholm University (2013)
- Charles Stark Draper Prize (2011)
- National Medal of Technology and Innovation (2011)
- American Academy of Arts and Sciences (2011)
- Honorary Degree of Doctor of Science from Stockholm University (2013)
- Elected fellow of the American Association for the Advancement of Science (2010)
- Elected fellow of the American Academy of Microbiology (2009)
- Elected to the National Academy of Sciences (2008)
- FASEB Excellence in Science Award (2007)
- Enzyme Engineering Award from Engineering Conferences International and Genencor (2007)
- Francis P. Garvan–John M. Olin Medal, American Chemical Society (2005)
- Elected fellow of American Institute for Medical and Biological Engineering (2001)
- National Academy of Engineering (2000)

== Appearances in popular media ==
She portrayed herself in the 18th episode "The Laureate Accumulation" of the 12th season of the TV series The Big Bang Theory. In September 2021 in the 10th anniversary of PME UChicago she jokingly claimed that this appearance was the greatest accolade of her life. She also appeared in a brief interview in the NOVA episode Beyond the Elements: Life. She was interviewed by Jim Al-Khalili on the BBC's The Life Scientific on September 6, 2022.

== See also ==
- Timeline of women in science
- List of International Fellows of the Royal Academy of Engineering
