= Alfriend =

Alfriend may refer to:

- Edward M. Alfriend (1837–1901), American veteran and writer
- Terry Alfriend (born 1940), American aerospace engineer
