= VCU School of Business =

Unit of Virginia Commonwealth University

Virginia Commonwealth University School of Business
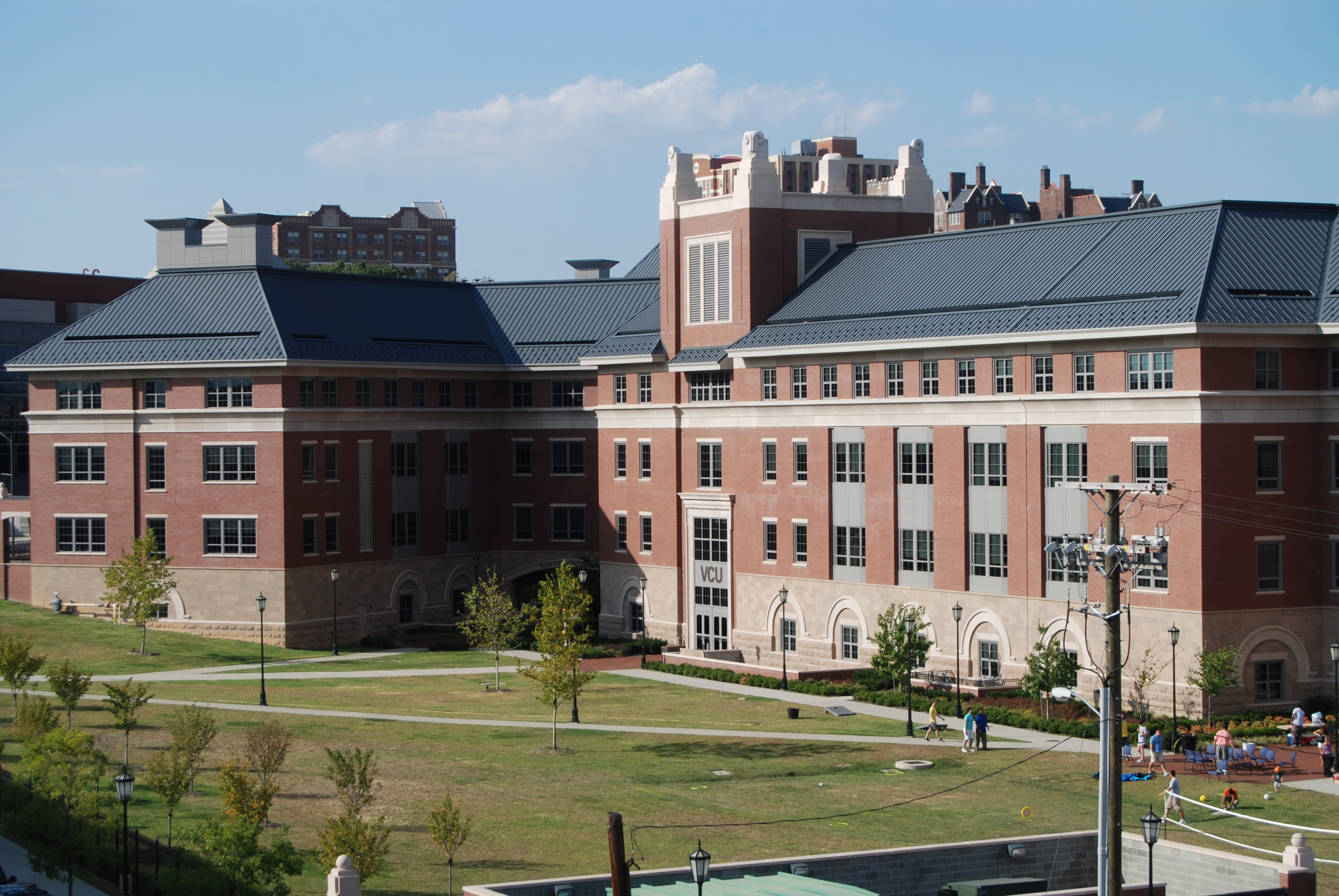
- Type: Public business school
- Parent institution: Virginia Commonwealth University
- Dean: Brian P. Brown (Interim)
- Academic staff: 160
- Students: 3,836
- Location: Richmond, Virginia, United States; 37.5447°N 77.4483°W
- Website: business.vcu.edu

The Virginia Commonwealth University School of Business is the business school of Virginia Commonwealth University, a public research university in Richmond, Virginia.

== History ==
=== The Beginning ===
The School of Business opened on September 22, 1937 as the School of Store Service Education. Henry Hibbs, president of the Richmond Division of the College of William and Mary, had secured a federal grant to train executives for the growing retail sector. The school trained educators to teach salesmanship, retailing, and department store training programs. VCU School of Business has grown from an initial class of 11 students to a student body of nearly 4,000.

=== 1940s G.I. Bill of Rights ===
In 1944, eight men were enrolled full-time at the school. By 1948, male enrollment had increased to 890 students, transforming RPI from chiefly women's college into a coeducational institution. This was primarily caused by the enactment of the G.I. Bill of Rights. Accounting was added as a degree in 1946. The Department of Business Administration became the School of Business.

=== 1958 Center for Corporate Education ===
In 1958, the School of Business founded the Adult Business Education Center to serve area companies through short-term courses, workshops and seminars. It is now known as the Center for Corporate Education.

=== 1986 Experimental Economics Lab ===
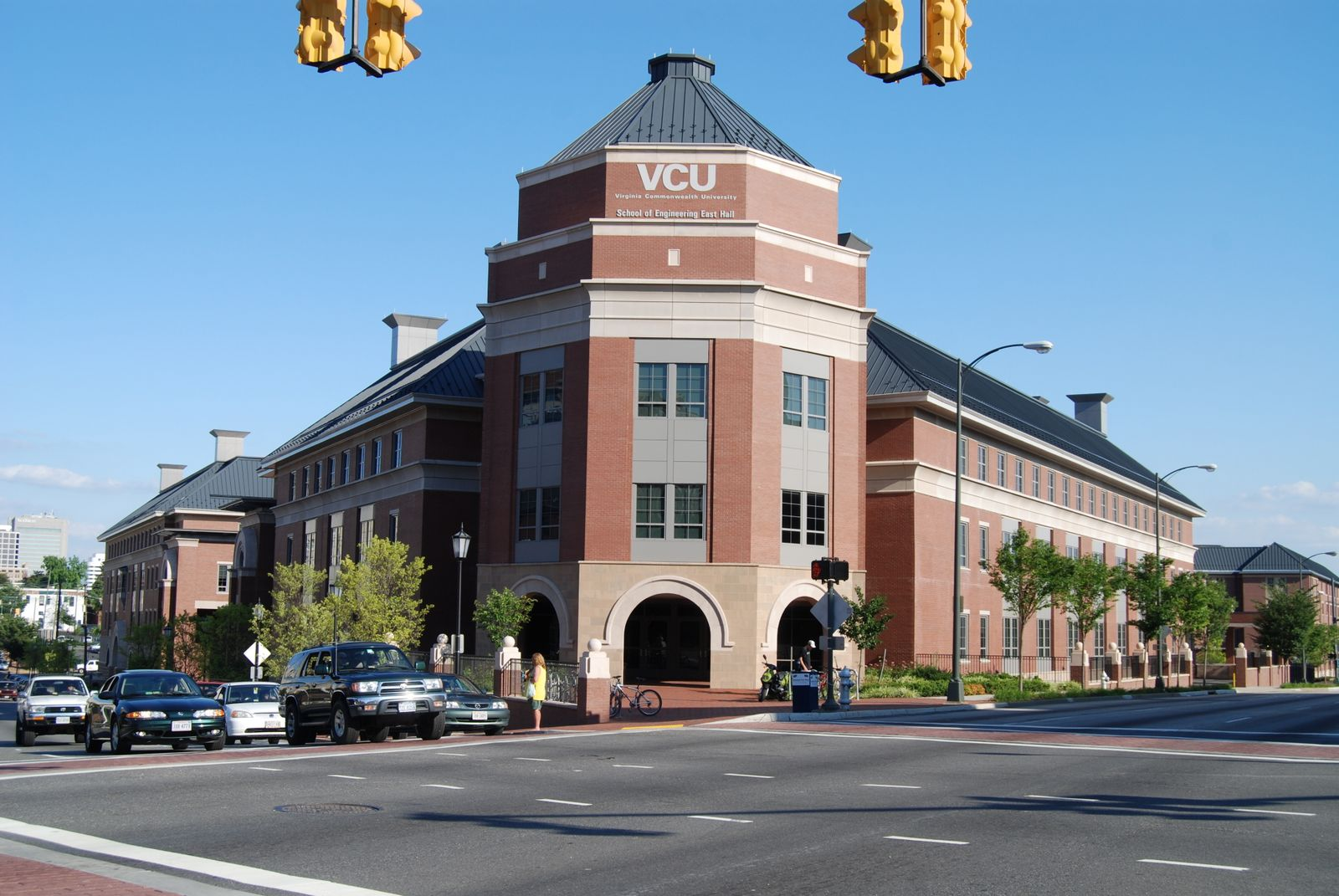
The DaVinci Center

The Experimental Economics Lab, opened in 1986 and was the first of its kind to employ the IBM PC network as a tool for replicating actual market environments.

=== 1994 Fast Track MBA & International Business Forum ===
The VCU Executive MBA (formerly the Fast Track Executive MBA) was founded in 1994 and has attracted more than 1,000 mid-level executives and professionals. Universal Corp provided a grant in 1994 that allowed VCU to establish the first International Business Forum.

=== 1999–2007 Campaign for the School of Business ===
Steven A. Markel, vice chairman of Markel Corporation, who was also chair of the school's executive leadership committee, and William H. Goodwin Jr., president and CEO of CCA Industries Inc. chaired of the VCU School of Engineering foundation. He envisioned the expantion of VCU's campus across Belvidere Street. An initial $10 million gift from Steve and Kathie Markel (the largest donation in the school's history) and $1 million from Tom and Vickie Snead, started a campaign to increased donations for the School of Business Foundation. The Foundation raised $51.5 million, which funded the construction of Snead Hall.

=== 2007 Business Career Services ===
Prior to 2007, students were given advice and steered toward internships and jobs by faculty, the University Career Center, and alumni volunteers. In 2007, VCU created a dedicated career services meant for business students in Snead Hall.

=== 2008 VCU da Vinci Center ===
The da Vinci Center of Innovation was created in 2008. It combines the VCU School of Engineering, VCU School of the Arts, and the VCU School of Business into teams collaborating on finding ways to solve business problems.

== Campus ==
Snead Hall opened in January 2008. In addition to classroom and faculty offices, the 145,000 square-foot, four-story facility includes a capital markets center and trading room, central atrium with a student commons and cafe, Business and Engineering Career Center, Center for Corporate Education, auditorium, collaborative learning rooms, tiered case study classrooms and team-building breakout rooms.

The current master plan calls for an Executive Center to be built on the block that is located east of the current business building. The 130,000 square feet (12,000 m^{2}) building is estimated to cost $65 million.

=== Previous locations ===
- Ginter House (1937)- The site of the first business classes taught in the School of Store Service Education, known as 901 S. Franklin St. The Ginter House was built from 1888-1892 and is considered a fine example of Richardsonian architecture in Virginia.
- Franklin Street Gym (1950s) - RPI's first new building. The art department and the secretarial science department of the School of Business are housed here. The director of the School of Business also had his office in the new gym.
- School of Business Building (1972) - Currently known as Grace E. Harris Hall, the School of Business Building was a 90 classroom building opened in 1972 thanks to $3.917 million in funding from the Commonwealth of Virginia.

== Rankings ==
VCU MBA is included in the Princeton Review's "The Best 294 Business Schools: 2012 Edition." Schools selected for inclusion in the book were determined to be the country's best institutions for earning an MBA.
