= Aristos Aristidou =

American chemical engineer

Aristos A. Aristidou is a chemical engineer and professor of chemical engineering at Texas A&M University (TAMU). At the university, he is also the Jack E. & Frances Brown Chair III and director of the Center for Advanced Biomanufacturing and Sustainability. In 2018, he was elected to the National Academy of Engineering.

Aristidou received a B.S. (1989) and Ph.D. (1994) in chemical engineering from Rice University. He was a postdoctoral researcher in the Metabolic Engineering Laboratory at the Massachusetts Institute of Technology.

From 1997 to 2001, Aristidou was employed at the Finnish Technical Research Center. From 2001 to 2007 he was at NatureWorks, and from 2007 to 2012 he was at Gevo Incorporated, all in bioprocess research and development. Aristidou worked in various biotechnology roles at Cargill between 2012 and 2023, including as a corporate fellow beginning in 2022, before serving as the chief scientific officer of Biomason from 2023 to 2024.

In 2024, he joined Texas A&M as a professor in the department of chemical engineering and director of the Center for Advanced Biomanufacturing and Sustainability. His research at TAMU is on sustainable systems and biomanufacturing. Since 2025, he also holds the Jack E. & Frances Brown Chair III. (Note: Chairs I and II were held by Kenneth R. Hall and Terry Alfriend, respectively.) He is a former member of the Edison Awards steering committee.
