= Raymond and Beverly Sackler Prize in Convergence Research =

The Raymond and Beverly Sackler Prize in Convergence Research, first awarded in 2015, is a prize conferred by the United States National Academy of Sciences. The award recognizes significant advances in convergence research, defined as work integrating scientific disciplines, and is presented for achievements that are possible only through such integration. The winner is presented with a medal and a $350,000 cash prize.

The inaugural prize was awarded to Chad A. Mirkin in 2015 "for impressively integrating chemistry, materials science, molecular biology, and biomedicine in the development of spherical nucleic acids and new types of nanostructures that are widely used in the rapid and automated diagnosis of infectious diseases and many other human diseases—including cancers and cardiac disease—and in the detection of drug-resistant bacteria."

The winner in 2016 was Stephen R. Quake "for his innovative technological advances in microfluidics and genomics that made possible new non-invasive diagnostic procedures to detect at the single cell and single molecule levels a variety of disease conditions, such as brain tumors and the rejection of transplanted organs, as well as the prenatal diagnosis of genetic diseases."

The prize was awarded to Frances H. Arnold in 2017 "for her pioneering directed molecular evolution strategies, used worldwide to optimize the functions of enzymes and to engineer cells to produce biofuels and chemicals from renewable resources."

The 2018 prize, for convergence research that benefits human health, was won by Joseph M. DeSimone. As of 2023 no further prizes were listed on the National Academy of Sciences Web site.
