= Andrew E. Lange =

American physicist (1957–2010)

Andrew E. Lange (July 23, 1957 – January 22, 2010) was an American astrophysicist and Goldberger Professor of Physics at the California Institute of Technology in Pasadena, California. Lange came to Caltech in 1993, becoming chair of the Division of Physics, Mathematics and Astronomy the next year. Upon his death in 2010, Caltech's president Jean-Lou Chameau called him "a truly great physicist and astronomer who had made seminal discoveries in observational cosmology".

== Early life ==
Lange was born in Urbana, Illinois on 23 July 1957, the oldest son of Joan Lange, a school librarian, and Alfred Lange, an architect, and he grew up in Easton, Connecticut. Lange received his BA in physics from Princeton University in 1980, and the PhD in physics from University of California, Berkeley in 1987, being offered a professorship immediately after. He arrived at Caltech in 1993–1994 as a visiting associate, and was appointed Full Professor in 1994. He was appointed Goldberger professor in 2001, and senior research scientist at the Jet Propulsion Laboratory in 2006.

== Family ==
In 1994, Lange unofficially married Frances Arnold, winner of the Nobel Prize in Chemistry (2018), with whom he had two sons, William A. Lange and Joseph I. Lange; the state of California was never notified. In 2016, William died in an accident.

== Observations of the cosmic microwave background ==
Lange's research interests focused on the Cosmic Microwave Background (CMB) and instrumentation for its study. The CMB is believed to be the light of the Big Bang, red-shifted from the visible into the sub-millimeter range by the cosmic expansion in the intervening 13.8 billion years. He developed a new generation of radio receivers for this study, and used them in a string of experiments to study the CMB.

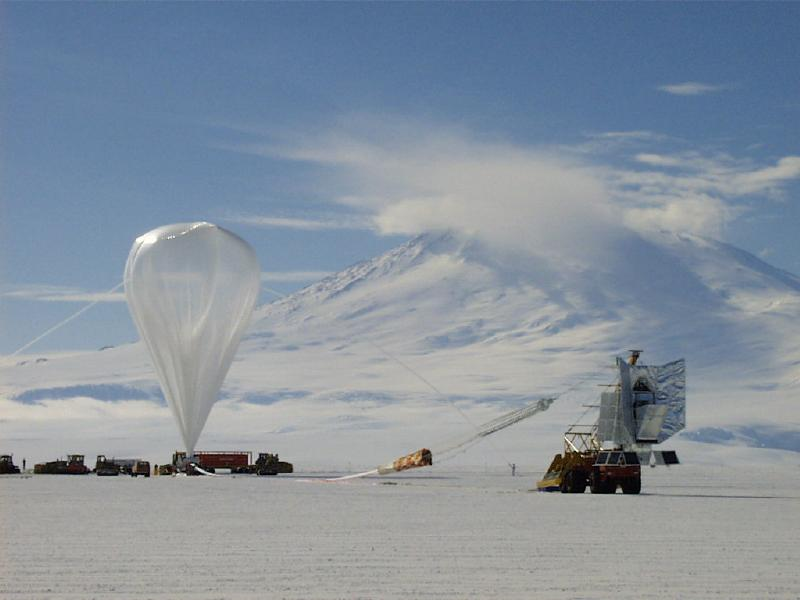
The BOOMERanG Telescope being readied for launch

In 1987 a Japanese-American team led by Lange, Paul Richards of UC Berkeley, and Toshio Matsumoto of Nagoya University announced that the spectrum CMB was not that of a true black body. In a sounding rocket experiment they detected an excess brightness at wavelengths of 0.5 and 0.7 mm. This result cast doubt on the validity of the Big Bang theory in general and helped support the rival Steady State theory. However, the presentation by Dr. John Mather (in January 1990) of the spectrum by FIRAS (Far-InfraRed Absolute Spectrophotometer) on the COBE satellite showed a perfect fit of the CMB and the theoretical curve for a black body at a temperature of 2.73 K, removing the earlier apparent contradiction with the standard cosmological model.

Lange was principal investigator on the BOOMERanG balloon-borne experiment which, in a 1998 flight, strongly confirmed the geometrical flatness of the universe to high precision, strongly supporting the theory of cosmic inflation. He was a US leader in a collaboration on the European Planck spacecraft, launched in May 2009, for studying the CMB, and in the effect of gravitational waves on the polarization of the CMB.

== Prizes and awards ==
He was elected a Fellow of the American Physical Society in 2001.

In 2003 Lange and Saul Perlmutter of the Lawrence Berkeley National Laboratory in Berkeley were jointly named "California Scientists of the Year" by the California ScienCenter. Lange was a member of the American Academy of Arts and Sciences, and in 2004 was elected to the US National Academy of Sciences in physics.

In 2006 he shared the Balzan Prize in observational astronomy and astrophysics with Paolo de Bernardis of Italy. In 2009 he was awarded the Dan David Prize (in astrophysics) for his contributions to our understanding of the History of the Universe.

== Death ==
Andrew Lange checked into a hotel on January 21, 2010. The next morning housekeepers found him dead, apparently from asphyxiation. The Pasadena Police Department determined his death to be a suicide. A tribute and obituary, penned by theoretical physicist Marc Kamionkowski, and later published in the Bulletin of the American Astronomical Society, stated that Lange had battled severe depression, unknown to many of his even closest colleagues, for many years.
