= Jay Bailey =

American chemical engineer (1944–2001)

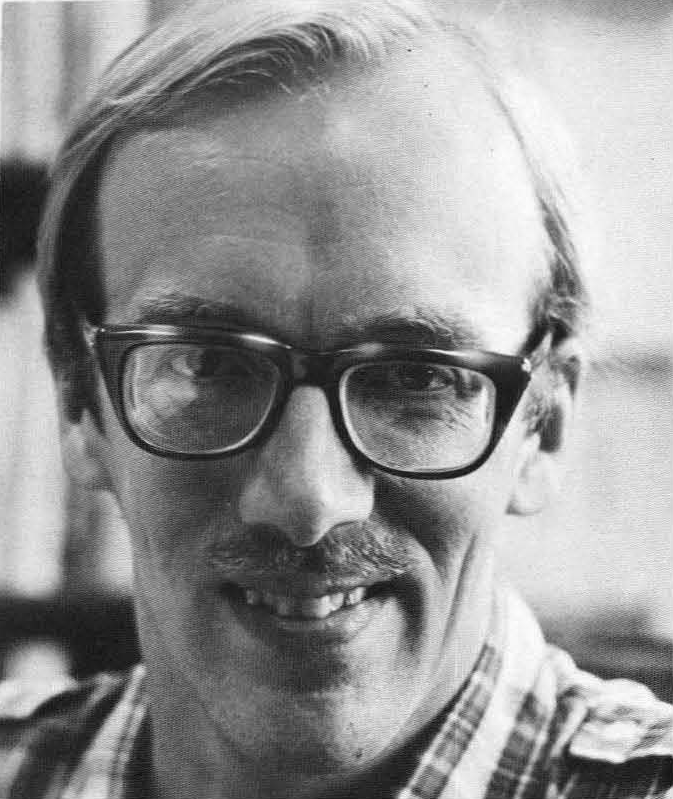
- James E. Bailey in 1986
- Born: James Edward Bailey; 1944; Texas, U.S.
- Died: 9 May 2001 (aged 56–57); Zurich, Switzerland
- Education: Rice University
- Known for: Metabolic engineering
- Spouse: Frances Arnold (m. 1987; div. 1991)
- Scientific career
- Fields: Chemical engineering
- Workplaces: ETH Zurich
- Doctoral advisor: Fritz Horn
- Notable students: Douglas S. Clark; Chaitan Khosla

James Edward Bailey (1944 – 9 May 2001) was an American pioneer of biochemical engineering, particularly metabolic engineering. In a special issue of a journal dedicated to his work, the editor said "Jay was one of biochemical engineering's most creative thinkers and spirited advocates, a true innovator who played an enormous role in establishing biochemical engineering as the dynamic discipline it is today". His numerous contributions in biotechnology and metabolic engineering have led to multiple awards including the First Merck Award in Metabolic Engineering.

He is commemorated in the James E. Bailey Award for Outstanding Contributions to the Field of Biological Engineering, by the AIChE Society for Biological Engineering.

== Life ==
Bailey was the only child of Jim and Doris Bailey, growing up in Rockford, Illinois. He studied chemical engineering at Rice University receiving a BA in 1966 and PhD in 1969 working with Fritz Horn. He worked for Shell then taught chemical engineering at the University of Houston starting in 1971. He moved to Caltech in 1980 and subsequently became Professor of Biotechnology at the Swiss Federal Institute of Technology (ETH) in Zurich in 1992. Jay died of cancer 9 May 2001.

He was married to fellow chemical engineer Frances Arnold and had a son, James Howard Bailey (born in 1990) with her. He has another son, Sean Bailey, an American film and television producer who has been the president of Walt Disney Studios Motion Picture Production since his appointment in 2010 until 2024.
