= Elmer L. Gaden =

American scientist and academic (1923–2012)

- Born: Sept. 26, 1923; Brooklyn, New York, US
- Died: March 10, 2012 (aged 88); Charlottesville, Virginia, US
- Education: Polytechnic Institute of New York University, Columbia University
- Known for: Father of Biochemical Engineering
- Spouse: Jennifer Marie Soley Gaden
- Awards: Russ Prize (2009)
- Scientific career
- Fields: Biochemistry
- Workplaces: Columbia University

Elmer L. Gaden Jr. (Sept. 26, 1923 – March 10, 2012) has been described as "the father of biochemical engineering". A graduate of Columbia University, he wrote a dissertation that quantified the amount of oxygen necessary to fuel the fermentation process used to produce penicillin. Gaden established Columbia's program in biochemical engineering. He remained at Columbia for 26 years as a teacher, researcher, and department chair, before becoming dean of the college of engineering, mathematics, and business administration at the University of Vermont in 1974. In 1979, he joined the engineering faculty at the University of Virginia as the Wills Johnson Professor of Chemical Engineering. In 1994 he retired from Virginia, becoming Wills Johnson Professor Emeritus. He died in 2012.

== Early life and education ==
Gaden was born in Brooklyn, New York in 1923. He began attending Brooklyn Technical High School in 1936. He served in the Navy during World War II, where he attended Columbia University on an accelerated schedule, receiving a bachelor's degree in chemical engineering. Gaden then served in the Pacific theater, before returning to Columbia to receive his master's degree and doctorate.

== Work and recognition ==
Large-scale production of penicillin prompted Gaden's doctoral dissertation topic. Gaden's paper explained to chemical engineers the fundamentals of the scientific process behind penicillin production. It also helped them determine how to quantify the amount of oxygen they would need for an effective fermentation. Gaden presented the paper at a meeting of the American Chemical Society in 1950. It was later published in Industrial and Engineering Chemistry.

Gaden spent a year as a researcher at Pfizer, Inc. before he was invited to return to Columbia University to establish its first biochemical engineering program. He twice chaired the school's Department of Chemical Engineering and Applied Chemistry. Gaden was known as a demanding teacher who expected much from the thousands of students whom he taught.

In 1986 Gaden received the Egleston Medal for distinguished engineering achievement from Columbia University. A year later, Rensselaer Polytechnic Institute awarded him an honorary doctorate.

Gaden's interest in harnessing biological processes to produce chemicals led him to publish extensively and to found the international research journal Biotechnology and Bioengineering, which he edited for 25 years. Elected a member of the National Academy of Engineering and a fellow of the American Institute of Chemical Engineers, he received AIChE's first Food, Pharmaceutical, and Bioengineering Award and its Founders Award in 1988. Later, he received the Chemical Engineering Lectureship Award from the American Society of Engineering Education. In 1994, Gaden was honored in a symposium presented by the American Chemical Society, where he also received the Marvin Johnson Award in recognition of his preeminent research contributions to modern biochemical technology.

== Retirement and death ==
In 2009, Ohio University and the National Academy of Engineering recognized Gaden as the fifth recipient of the 2009 Fritz J. and Dolores H. Russ Prize, the world's top honor in bioengineering.

Gaden volunteered to teach illiterate adults how to read and enjoyed birdwatching with his wife .

Elmer Gaden Jr died on Saturday March 10, 2012. He and his wife of 48 years, Jennifer Marie Soley Gaden, had one daughter, Barbara; and two sons, David and Paul.
