= Chaitan Khosla =

Indian biochemist and chemical engineer

- Education: Indian Institute of Technology, Bombay, Caltech
- Known for: Polyketide synthases, Celiac Disease
- Awards: Alan T. Waterman Award (1999); ACS Award in Pure Chemistry (2000)
- Scientific career
- Fields: Biochemistry, Chemical Engineering
- Workplaces: Stanford University
- Doctoral advisor: Jay Bailey

Chaitan Khosla is an Indian-born American biochemist, the Wells H. Rauser and Harold M. Petiprin Professor of Chemical Engineering and Chemistry at Stanford University. He earned his B.Tech. in chemical engineering from the Indian Institute of Technology Bombay in 1985 and his Ph.D. from the California Institute of Technology in 1990, while working with Jay Bailey on the expression of the Vitreoscilla Hemoglobin gene. He did his postdoctoral work at the John Innes Centre with David Hopwood. He has been a professor at Stanford since 1992 and was the program chair. His research is focused on two realms: the first is to build a molecular understanding of polyketide synthases, and the second is focused on the biochemistry of celiac disease, particularly involving tissue transglutaminase. His group play a large role in identifying the role of the α2-gliadin fragment in immune responses.

His early research on natural product polyketides led to the founding of Kosan Biosciences in 1995. His work on celiac sprue has resulted in the founding of Alvine Pharmaceuticals and the start of the non-profit, Celiac Sprue Research Foundation. He also serves as an advisor to LS9, Inc. and Joule Unlimited. He has won numerous awards, including the Alan T. Waterman Award (1999), the Eli Lilly Award in Biological Chemistry (1999), the ACS Award in pure chemistry (2000), and the Jay Bailey Award (2011).

He was elected a member of the National Academy of Engineering in 2009 for engineering molecular assembly lines, developing metabolic engineering technologies, and advancing biopharmaceutical discovery. He is also a fellow of the American Academy of Arts and Sciences and a recipient of a Distinguished Alumnus Award from Caltech.
