= Sheldon Weinbaum =

American biomedical engineer and biofluid mechanician

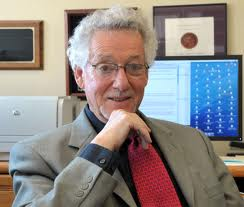
- Born: July 26, 1937 (age 89); Brooklyn, New York, U.S.
- Education: Rensselaer Polytechnic Institute; Harvard University
- Awards: National Academy of Sciences, National Academy of Engineering, National Academy of Medicine, American Academy of Arts and Sciences, Guggenheim Fellowship
- Scientific career
- Fields: Biomedical Engineering
- Workplaces: The City College of New York
- Doctoral advisor: George F. Carrier

Sheldon Weinbaum: (born July 26, 1937, in Brooklyn, New York, United States) is an American biomedical engineer and biofluid mechanician. He is a CUNY Distinguished Professor Emeritus of Biomedical and Mechanical Engineering at The City College of New York. In 2022 he received the Benjamin Franklin Medal in Biomedical Engineerings from the Franklin Institute in Philadelphia.

In 2023, Weinbaum received the National Medal of Science, the highest scientific honor awarded by the United States government. The award citation recognized his “pathbreaking research in biomechanics,” noting that his theoretical models advanced understanding of physiology, bone biology, and blood flow and contributed to research on cardiovascular disease and related medical treatments.

== Biography ==
Weinbaum was born and raised in Brooklyn, New York. His parents are Alex Weinbaum, who emigrated to the U.S. from Russia in 1921, and Frances (Stark) Weinbaum. He attended Jamaica High School, Queens, and Abraham Lincoln High School, Brooklyn, and received his bachelor's degree from Rensselaer Polytechnic Institute in Aeronautical Engineering in 1959. He earned his MS in Applied Physics 1960 and his PhD in Engineering 1963 from Harvard University where he was a Gordon McKay Prize and then National Science Foundation Fellow. His dissertation is titled “Natural convection phenomena in horizontal circular cylinders” and completed under the direction of George F. Carrier. He subsequently worked for the Avco Everett Research Laboratory and the General Electric Space Sciences Laboratory in Valley Forge, where he did research in high altitude aerodynamics. He developed what is now referred to as the Weinbaum-Weiss model of the high altitude laminar near wake. He became active in the anti-war movement of the 1960s and returned to academia in 1967 as an associate professor in the Department Mechanical Engineering at The City College of New York. He was promoted to professor in 1972, became a Herbert G Kayser Chair Professor in 1980 and a CUNY distinguished professor in 1986. Weinbaum married Alexandra Tamara Wolkowicz in 1962 and they have two children, Alys Eve Weinbaum and Daniel Eden Weinbaum.

== Career ==
Weinbaum is widely recognized for novel biomechanical models that have changed existing views in such areas as bone fluid flow and mechanotransduction (how bone cells sense mechanical forces), vulnerable plaque rupture (principal cause of cardiovascular death), the role of the endothelial glycocalyx in initiating intracellular signaling, microvascular fluid exchange, revised Starling hypothesis now referred to as Michel-Weinbaum model for capillary filtration, endothelial transport aspects of arterial disease, glomerular-tubular balance in the renal tubule, and bioheat transfer (Weinbaum-Jiji equation for microvascular heat exchange between blood and tis, Buuuoyancy and flight sue). In each case he resolved a long-standing “mystery” by discovering either a new structure-such as micro-calcifications in the fibrous caps of vulnerable lesions or leaky junctions for transport of LDL across vascular endothelium- or a new function for a known structure –such as by demonstrating that the glycocalyx on endothelial cells senses the fluid shear stress of the blood flow and transmits it to the intracellular cytoskeleton. He has also proposed a new concept for a high speed train where lift is generated by a giant ski riding on a soft porous material in a channel with impermeable side walls.

Weinbaum has been instrumental in the development of the biomedical engineering program at The City College of New York and CUNY. In 1994 he and Stephen C. Cowin established the New York Center for Biomedical Engineering and in 1999 they introduced the new CUNY PhD program in Biomedical Engineering. This led to the creation of the Department of Biomedical Engineering in 2002 and an undergraduate degree program in this field.

From 2019 to 2021, Weinbaum served as the inaugural chair of the Diversity Committee of the National Academy of Engineering. He was also an honorary male member of the Committee on Women in Science, Engineering, and Medicine (CWISEM) of the National Academies from 2014 to 2021.

In addition to his academic research, Weinbaum authored a children’s science book titled The Amazing Scientific Adventures of Harvy, a Brilliant Cane, which introduces young readers to scientific concepts through storytelling. The book was featured on Rick Bratton’s program This Week in America.. In 2026 Weinbaum published a new version of the book for high school students titled "From the Physics of Gravity, Buoyancy and Flight to a Jet Train that Skies at the Speed of Airplanes".

=== Contributions to diversity ===
Weinbaum is recognized as a pioneering advocate for women and minorities in science and engineering. As an untenured professor he was almost fired in 1969 for his role in supporting Black and Hispanic students in their takeover of the City College campus in their protest against existing admission policies. In 1977 he established the first summer outreach program at The City College for low income public high school students in science and engineering. In 1988 he received the Public Service Award of the Fund for the City of New York from Mayor Edward Koch for his role in recruiting women and minority faculty and students to the Grove School of Engineering.

His 1992 class-action lawsuit Weinbaum vs. Cuomo (lead article Metro Section of the New York Times) brought national attention to the alleged racially discriminatory funding of higher education in New York State. The initial positive ruling was overturned on the New York State Court of Appeals in 1996 on the grounds that the state did not have to fund its two university systems CUNY and SUNY equally provided neither university had racially biased admissions. Weinbaum then turned his attention to encouraging high achieving underrepresented minority (URM) students to go to graduate school and pursue a PhD in a series of grants from the Sloan Foundation and National Heart, Lung, and Blood Institute at NIH 1997–2013. The success of the latter program is described by Pulitzer Prize winning reporter Kenneth Cooper in “Diverse Issues in Higher Education”. In 2020 Weinbaum received the PAESMEM Award from the White House for his excellence in mentoring of underrepresented minority students.

== Awards ==
He is a member of all three U.S. national academies (National Academy of Sciences, National Academy of Engineering and National Academy of Medicine) and also the American Academy of Arts and Sciences. In 2002 when he was elected to NAM he became the sixth living individual to be a member of all three National Academies and the first to achieve this distinction since 1992. In 2020 he received Presidential Award for Excellence in Science, Mathematics, and Engineering Mentoring

== See also ==
- Members of the United States National Academy of Sciences
- Members of the United States National Academy of Engineering
- Members of the Institute of Medicine of the National Academies
- Guggenheim Fellows 2002
