= Stuart L. Cooper =

American engineer

- Born: 1938 or 1939 (age 86–87) (Note: In 2006, Cooper was reported to be 65); Queens, New York City, USA

Academic background
- Education: BSc, Chemical Engineering, 1963, Massachusetts Institute of Technology; PhD, Princeton University

Academic work
- Institutions: University of Wisconsin–Madison; University of Delaware; Illinois Institute of Technology; North Carolina State University; Ohio State University

Stuart L. Cooper is an American engineer. As a Full Professor and Chair of Ohio State University's Department of Chemical and Biomolecular Engineering, Cooper was elected to the National Academy of Engineering in 2011.

== Early life and education ==
Cooper was raised in Queens, New York City. He earned his Bachelor of Science degree in chemical engineering from the Massachusetts Institute of Technology and his Ph.D. from Princeton University.

== Career ==
Following his PhD, Cooper joined the faculty at the University of Wisconsin–Madison (UW–Madison) and served as chair of its department of chemical engineering from 1983 to 1989. Prior to his appointment as chair, Cooper was selected as a Fellow of the American Physical Society for his success in the field of chemical engineering. While serving as chair, Cooper focused his research on the interaction of blood and the synthetic materials. He was specifically interested in the development of materials that could minimize blood clot formation on artificial organs. As such, Cooper received the 1987 Clemson Award for Basic Research by the Society for Biomaterials and the 1987 American Institute of Chemical Engineers' Materials Engineering and Sciences Division Award. In 1988, Cooper was appointed the inaugural co-editor of the Journal of Biomaterials Science, Polymer Edition. Following his resignation as chair, Cooper was named the Paul A. Elfers Professor of Chemical Engineering at UW–Madison.

In 1992, Cooper left UW–Madison to accept an appointment as dean of the University of Delaware's College of Engineering. In this role, he focused on integrating chemical engineering with biomedical engineering to advance polymer blood compatibility and biocompatibility. His research earned him an election to president of the Society for Biomaterials and the 1997 International Award for Achievement in Biomaterials from the Japanese Society for Biomaterials. He was also elected to the American Institute for Medical and Biological Engineering (AIMBE) College of Fellows. Finally, Cooper co-discovered a family of antibacterial compounds that can to tied to polymers, creating antibacterial plastics. In 2003, Nina Lamba, the postdoctoral student who helped him with this discovery, established CCL Biomedical, a start-up technology company.

Following this, Cooper served as vice president and chief academic officer at Illinois Institute of Technology starting in September 1998. He then joined North Carolina State University (NCSU) in 2001 as the school's provost. However, he remained at the school for only 17 months after he resigned in January 2003 in protest of the firing of two of his senior administrators. Following his resignation, Cooper joined the faculty of Ohio State University (OSU) in January 2004 as chair of the Department of Chemical and Biomolecular Engineering.

=== Ohio State University ===
Upon joining the faculty at OSU, Cooper continued to conduct research on the chemistry and microphase morphology of polyurethane multiblock polymers. In 2011, his "contributions to polymer chemistry, biomedical polyurethanes, blood compatibility and academic administration" was recognized with an election to the National Academy of Engineering. Following this, he also received the 2013 Chemistry of Thermoplastic Elastomers Award from the American Chemical Society Rubber Division. As his external roles grew, Cooper stepped down as department chair and was replaced with Andre Francis Palmer in October 2014. During the same year, Cooper accepted the 2014 Founders Award for Outstanding Contributions to the Field of Chemical Engineering from the American Institute of Chemical Engineers (AIChE). He was also re-elected as a Council Delegate from the Section on Engineering for the American Association for the Advancement of Science Board.

After having been a member of Sigma Xi, a scientific research and international honor society, since 1963, Cooper was voted in as president-elect for 2017. He also co-edited Advances in Polyurethane Biomaterials, a compilation of 22 chapters on the topic of Advances in Polyurethane Biomaterials, with Jianjun Guan.

In 2020, Cooper was one of seven chemists and chemical engineers named a Fellow of the American Chemical Society's Polymer Division. He was cited as being "a true pioneer in the biomaterials field, having broken vital new ground in understanding interactions of polymeric materials with physiological fluids and tissues since more than 40 years ago." Following this, he was named to the inaugural cohort of Fellows for the honor society Sigma Xi. Cooper was also one of two OSU engineers elected to the National Academy of Inventors. He was specifically recognized for his research that "showed polyurethane thermoplastic elastomers are suitable materials for a variety of blood and tissue contact applications."

== Selected publications ==
- Advances in Polyurethane Biomaterials (2016)
