= Jefferson C. Lievense =

American bioengineer

- Born: Jackson, Michigan
- Education: University of Michigan
- Occupation: Bioprocess Engineer

Jefferson C. Lievense is an American bioprocess engineer.

Lievense was raised in Holland, Michigan. He completed a bachelor's degree in chemical engineering at the University of Michigan in 1976 and a doctoral degree in the same subject at Purdue University in 1984. In 1982, he began working for the Eastman Kodak Company's Research Laboratories and then its Bio-Products Division (BPD). He joined Genencor International in 1990 when BPD was spun out into Genencor. In 1993, Lievense subsequently joined the Michigan Biotechnology Institute before moving to A. E. Staley in 1994. Between 2007 and 2012, Lievense worked for Amyris, Inc. He then moved to Genomatica, and retired in 2018. He currently operates his own consulting business, Lievense Bioengineering LLC, to advise in the field of industrial biotechnology.

In 2019, Lievense was elected a member of the United States National Academy of Engineering.
