= Michigan Biotechnology Institute =

Biotechnology research institute in Michigan, USA

MBI (the Michigan Biotechnology Institute) is a non-profit 501(c)(3) biotechnology research accelerator based in Lansing, Michigan. MBI came into existence in 1982 through a joint collaboration between the State of Michigan and a few different organizations, including the W.K. Kellogg Foundation. MBI's original goal, as stated by Russell G. Mawby, chairman and CEO of the W.K. Kellogg Foundation, was to "link university research with applications of biotechnology to expand our forest and agricultural industries, create jobs, and further improve the state's economic situation." The W.K. Kellogg foundation made a 4-year, $10 million grant to carry out this objective.

MBI is sought out by industry partners for its unique derisking capabilities and their market-driven multidisciplinary team that accelerates the commercialization of biobased technologies. MBI pioneered de-risking, a process that quickly and cost-effectively fails flawed technologies while accelerating viable ones through a stage-gated innovation process. MBI has collaborated with many notable companies in the industrial biotechnology, including: DuPont, Genomatica, OPX Bio, and Novozymes. Most recently, MBI collaborated with Bolt Threads (Emeryville, CA) to produce synthetic spider silk without the spiders. Bolt Threads leverages MBI's experience in process optimization and scale-up to produce large volumes of bioengineered silk fibers derived from natural proteins using the company's technology named Engineered Silk.

Historically, MBI also worked with Michigan State University and Cargill to develop PLA, the first biodegradable polymer in global use.

On February 7, 2014, President Obama and Secretary of Agriculture Tom Vilsack visited and toured MBI's facility prior to signing the Farm Bill at MSU's Mary Anne McPhail Equine Performance Center. President Obama learned about MSU and MBI's joint project, AFEX, a pretreatment process for crop residues, and visited the pilot facility. The pilot facility was funded by in 2011 by a $4.3 million grant from the US Department of Energy, allowing MBI to scale-up the technology. President Obama provided a favorable review of the AFEX technology during his visit.

MBI was purchased by the Michigan State University Foundation in 2007.

MBI is a wholly owned subsidiary of the Michigan State University Foundation and is located in Lansing, Michigan, on the south end of Michigan State University's campus.
