= Hongming Chen =

American chemical engineer

Hongming Chen is an American chemical engineer.

Chen earned a Bachelor's of Science degree in chemical engineering from the University of Texas at Austin in 1992, and completed a Master's and Doctor of Science in the same subject at the Massachusetts Institute of Technology. She then conducted research at Merck & Co. and AstraZeneca. She later helped establish TransForm Pharmaceuticals, which was later acquired by Johnson & Johnson, and subsequently worked for Kala Pharmaceuticals from its founding in 2010, then cofounded Metis Therapeutics.

In 2015, Chen was elected a fellow of the American Institute for Medical and Biological Engineering. She was elected to membership of the United States National Academy of Engineering in 2018.
