= VCU College of Engineering =

Department of the Virginia Commonwealth University

Virginia Commonwealth University College of Engineering
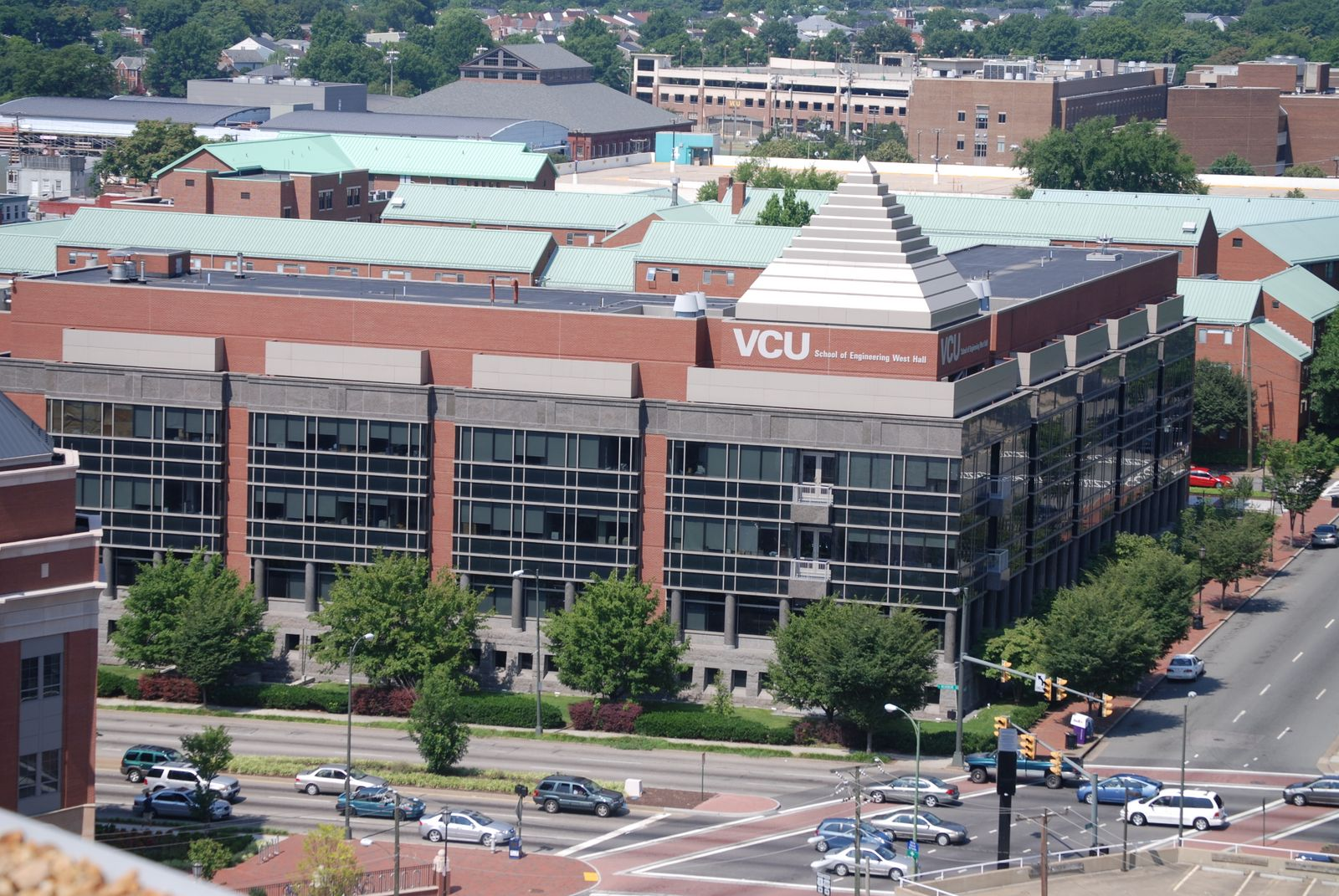
- VCU Engineering West Hall, Monroe Park campus.
- Type: Public engineering college
- Established: 1996
- Parent institution: Virginia Commonwealth University
- Dean: Azim Eskandarian
- Academic staff: 64
- Students: Nearly 2,000 undergraduate and approximately 300 graduate students
- Location: Richmond, Virginia, United States; 37.5456°N 77.4495°W
- Website: egr.vcu.edu

The VCU College of Engineering is the engineering college Virginia Commonwealth University, a public research university in Richmond, Virginia, United States. If offers undergraduate and graduate degrees. Established as the "School of Engineering" in 1996, its name and status was officially changed to the College of Engineering in April 2018. The college's former dean, Barbara D. Boyan, cited doubled faculty numbers and an increase in funding as reasoning for the switch from school to college.

Upon its founding, initial courses at the VCU school were offered in mechanical, electrical and chemical engineering. The school added a new undergraduate major in biomedical engineering in the fall of 1998. The undergraduate biomedical engineering program is unique in the Commonwealth, established as a response to the growing presence of biomedical companies in Virginia. VCU's long-standing degree programs in computer science joined the school in fall 2001. In May 2000, a graduate degree program in engineering was created and added to the historic graduate programs of biomedical engineering.

== Academics ==
The college offers undergraduate degrees in five engineering departments, including a Bachelor of Arts in Computer Science introduced in fall 2024. The college also offers Master of Science and Doctor of Philosophy degrees across all departments.

== Facilities ==
The first two of the School of Engineering's planned facilities opened in the fall of 1998 the main classroom building and the Virginia Microelectronics Research Center. Together, they total 147,000 square feet (13,700 m^{2}) at a cost of $42 million. To foster growth in enrollment and faculty number, the school embarked on an ambitious campaign to expand facilities, fund endowed scholarships, chairs, and academic programs. The campaign raised more than $67 million to meet these needs.

Facilities of the college include:

- 147,000 square feet (13,700 m^{2}) West Hall
- 131,000 square feet (12,200 m^{2}) East Hall
- 28,000 square feet (2,600 m^{2}) Microelectronics Lab
- 25,000 square feet (2,300 m^{2}) Health & Life Science Engineering Lab
- 92,000 square feet (8,500 m^{2}) Institute for Engineering and Medicine
- 133,000 square feet (12,400 m^{2}) Engineering Research Building

The Engineering Research Building, officially opened in February 2021, is a four-story, 133,000-square-foot (12,400 m^{2}) facility that significantly expands the college's laboratory capacity for advanced research. The $93 million building features interdisciplinary research laboratories, a 9,000-square-foot Innovation Maker Facility, career services center, and a Collaboration Hub and Innovation Courtyard designed to connect the college's facilities.

In January 2008, the school opened East Hall, a 120,000-square-foot (11,000 m^{2}) facility housing 48 research labs, 50 faculty offices, six classrooms, and other student spaces allowing for future growth of the college.

== Departments ==
- Biomedical Engineering
- Chemical and Life Science Engineering
- Electrical and Computer Engineering
- Computer Science
- Mechanical and Nuclear Engineering

== Convergence Lab Initiative ==
The Convergence Lab Initiative (CLI) is a cross-disciplinary research institute established with $17.8 million in funding from the Department of Defense. The initiative focuses on research in quantum and photonic devices, microelectronics, artificial intelligence, neuromorphic computing, arts and biomedical science.

== Statistics ==
Alumni: 2,936

=== Career Outcomes ===
95% of students are enrolled in graduate school or employed within 6 months of graduation, with 77% employed and 17% continuing their education in graduate school.

Top Employers of Alumni: Mitsubishi nuclear energy, Thomas & Betts Power, Altria, MWV, TRANE, and Infilco Degremont.

== Rankings and Recognition ==
VCU's nuclear engineering graduate program is ranked 18th nationally by U.S. News & World Report. The college's online Master's in Engineering program is ranked 22nd nationally.

== Notable Partnerships ==
The college maintains strong industry partnerships, including the Technical Graduate Program with Newport News Shipbuilding, which has enabled more than 75 engineers to earn their Master of Science degrees, with 86 currently enrolled.

The college also participates in the Virginia Alliance for Semiconductor Technology (VAST), a $3.3 million statewide initiative collaborating with other Virginia universities to advance semiconductor research and education.
