= Journal of Applied Physiology =

Monthly medical journal

- Discipline: Physiology
- Language: English
- Edited by: Sue Bodine

Publication details
- History: 1948–present
- Publisher: American Physiological Society (United States)
- Frequency: Monthly
- Impact factor: 3.531 (2020)

Standard abbreviations
- ISO 4: J. Appl. Physiol.

Indexing
- CODEN: JAPHEV
- ISSN: 8750-7587 (print); 1522-1601 (web)
- OCLC no.: 11603017

Links
- Journal homepage

The Journal of Applied Physiology is a monthly peer-reviewed medical journal of physiology published by the American Physiological Society. The journal was established in 1948, and is currently edited by Sue Bodine. According to the Journal Citation Reports, the journal has a 2020 impact factor of 3.531.
