= Barbara D. Boyan =

Dean of Engineering at Virginia Commonwealth University College of Engineering

- Born: Canada

Academic background
- Education: BA, 1970, MA, 1974, PhD, 1975, Rice University
- Thesis: MINERAL METABOLISM IN PULMONATE MOLLUSCS (1975)

Barbara Dale Boyan is the former Alice T. and William H. Goodwin Jr. Dean, College of Engineering at Virginia Commonwealth University College of Engineering. She now serves as the executive director for the Institute for Engineering and Medicine at the university.

== Early life and education ==
Boyan grew up in Canada to two parents in the business field who encouraged her pursuit of a medical career. She completed her Bachelor of Arts degree, Master's degree, and PhD from Rice University.

== Career ==
Upon graduating from Rice, Boyan accepted an assistant professor appointment at the UTHealth School of Dentistry. After her husband moved to San Antonio, she was transferred to the University of Texas at San Antonio's School of Dentistry with a joint appointment in biochemistry. In 1987, Boyan moved into the department of orthopedics at Long School of Medicine and undertook a study on how bone forms, how it is calcified, and how cartilage contributes to that process. In 1993, she co-founded OsteoBiologics Inc. to develop tissue-engineering medical products for the treatment of bone and cartilage defects.

Boyan joined the faculty of the Wallace H. Coulter Department of Biomedical Engineering in 2002 as the Price Gilbert Jr. Chair in Tissue Engineering. In this role, she also served as an associate dean for research and a Georgia Research Alliance Eminent Scholar. At Georgia Tech, Boyan continued her research into bone mineralization and working in the area of bone and cartilage cell biology in the field of orthopedic and oral health. As a result of her work, she was recognized by Atlanta Woman Magazine as one of their Top 10 Innovators. Boyan eventually collaborated with colleague Zvi Schwartz to found a SpherIngenics. The aim of the startup was to develop a method that protects cells from death and migration from the treatment site.

In 2009, she oversaw the establishment of the Georgia Tech Center for Advanced Bioengineering for Soldier Survivability. Boyan was appointed to the National Materials Advisory Board of the National Research Council of the National Academies and chaired their Roundtable on Biomedical Engineering Materials and Applications from 2008 to 2011. Following this, she was elected a Fellow of the International Team for Implantology and named the chair of the American Association for the Advancement of Science's Section on Dentistry and Oral Health Sciences. Near the conclusion of her tenure at Georgia Tech, Boyan was elected a Fellow of the National Academy of Engineering "for engineering implant technologies for bone and cartilage repair."

Prior to the 2012–13 academic year, Boyan was left Georgia Tech to become the Dean of the VCU College of Engineering. While serving in her new role as dean, she was elected a Fellow of the National Academy of Inventors because she has "demonstrated a highly prolific spirit of innovation in creating or facilitating outstanding inventions that have made a tangible impact on quality of life, economic development, and the welfare of society." In 2018, Boyan was chosen to chair the Board for Commonwealth Center for Advanced Logistics Systems.

During the COVID-19 pandemic, Boyan was appointed by the Governor of Virginia, Ralph Northam, as the Virginia Innovation Partnership Authority to "consolidate and integrate innovation, entrepreneurship, university research commercialization, and emergency development programs under one body." A few months later, she was honored with the Henry Farfan Award from the North American Spine Society for her "outstanding contributions in spine related basic science research." In 2021, she was elected a Fellow of the Orthopaedic Research Society.
