= William Howard Arnold (physicist) =

American nuclear physicist (1931-2015)

William Howard Arnold (1931-2015) was an American nuclear physicist, with primary areas of expertise in nuclear power, nuclear fuel, and nuclear waste disposal.

Arnold died July 16, 2015, at the age of 84.

== Early Years and Education ==
Howard Arnold was the son of Elizabeth (Lib) Welsh (Mullen) and Lieutenant General William Howard Arnold and was born May 13, 1931, at Jefferson Barracks, Missouri, near St. Louis. His father was commander of the 5th US Army and under Douglas MacArthur. Howard grew up on military bases and was accustomed to relocations as his family followed his father's career moves.

At age 16 Arnold won a scholarship to Cornell University where he graduated in 1951 with an A.B. in physics and chemistry. He went on to study physics at Princeton University, where one of his professors arranged for him to meet Albert Einstein. Arnold earned a master’s degree in physics in 1953 and a Ph.D, in 1955.

== Career ==
In the fall of 1955 Arnold joined the newly formed commercial atomic power group at Westinghouse. There he served as senior engineer and section manager, developing the reactor physics designs for Westinghouse's first commercial power reactors in the United States, Belgium, France, and Italy. He was promoted to president of the Nuclear International Division of Westinghouse Corporation. He designed nuclear reactor cores for civilian power reactors, for space power and propulsion, and for production of nuclear materials. He managed multidisciplinary groups of engineers and scientists working in reactor core design, and led work that promoted the use of centrifuge technology in uranium enrichment.

He served as general manager of the Advanced Energy Systems Division of Westinghouse Electric Company. From 1986 to 1989, he was vice president of Westinghouse Hanford Company, responsible for engineering, development and project management at the Hanford Site.

Arnold later became president and manager of the first privately owned uranium-enrichment facility in the United States, Louisiana Energy Services. He also became involved in an advisory capacity in the cleanup of Department of Energy (DOE) nuclear weapons material production sites, such as in the vitrification plant at the Savannah River Site.

In 1974, Arnold was elected to the National Academy of Engineering for his contributions to the systems engineering of light-water nuclear power plants and to the design of commercial pressurized water reactors for nuclear systems. He was a Fellow of and served on the board of directors of the American Nuclear Society. He was an expert on nuclear waste disposal, participating in several National Academy of Sciences studies, including chairing the 2003 study, titled "Improving the Scientific Basis for Managing DOE's Excess Nuclear Materials and Spent Nuclear Fuel".

In 2004, United States President George W. Bush appointed Dr. Arnold to the U.S. Nuclear Waste Technical Review Board.

== Family ==
Arnold met his future wife, Josephine Inman Routheau while he was in graduate school at Princeton. They were married for 63 years. She was the daughter of another military office who was in charge of ROTC at Princeton. Their daughter is Frances Arnold, Chemical Engineering Professor and 2018 Nobel Prize winner.
