= Jennifer Cochran =

American bioengineer

Jennifer R. Cochran
- Education: University of Delaware; Massachusetts Institute of Technology
- Scientific career
- Fields: Protein Engineering, Oncology Drug Discovery
- Workplaces: Stanford University
- Thesis: The Molecular Mechanism of T Cell Activation Investigated with Class II MHC Oligomers
- Doctoral advisor: Lawrence J. Stern

Jennifer R. Cochran is an American bioengineer specializing in biopharmaceutical protein discovery and development for oncology and regenerative medicine. She is the Senior Associate Vice Provost for Research and Professor of Bioengineering at Stanford University as of 2025.

Cochran completed a bachelor's degree in biochemistry at the University of Delaware in 1995, and pursued doctoral study in biological chemistry at the Massachusetts Institute of Technology. After graduating in 2001, she remained at MIT as a postdoctoral fellow. Cochran later joined the Stanford University faculty, where she was named Shriram Chair of the Department of Bioengineering. She was elected a fellow of the American Institute for Medical and Biological Engineering in 2018.

In 2025, Cochran was elected to the National Academy of Engineering.
