= Douglas S. Clark =

American chemical engineer (born 1957)

Douglas S. Clark (born 22 May 1957) is an American chemical engineer.

== Education and career ==
Clark earned a bachelor's degree in chemistry from the University of Vermont in 1979, and graduated with a doctorate in chemical engineering from Caltech in 1983, where he was advised by James Edward Bailey. Clark joined the University of California, Berkeley faculty in 1986, where he later held the Gilbert Newton Lewis Professorship, and has served as editor in chief of the scientific journal Biotechnology and Bioengineering since 1996. In 2013, Clark was named dean of the UC Berkeley College of Chemistry. He is also affiliated with the Lawrence Berkeley National Laboratory, as a chemical faculty engineer.

In 1995, Clark was elected a fellow of the American Institute for Medical and Biological Engineering. The American Association for the Advancement of Science granted him an equivalent honor in 2003. In 2014, Clark received the James E. Bailey Award for Biological Engineering from the Society for Biological Engineering, affiliated with the American Institute of Chemical Engineers. Clark is a 2019 member of the United States National Academy of Engineering.
