= SCHEMA (bioinformatics) =

SCHEMA is a computational algorithm used in protein engineering to identify fragments of proteins (called schemas) that can be recombined without disturbing the integrity of the proteins' three-dimensional structure. The algorithm calculates the interactions between a protein's different amino acid residues to determine which interactions may be disrupted by swapping structural domains of the protein. By minimizing these disruptions, SCHEMA can be used to engineer chimeric proteins that stably fold and may have altered function relative to their parent proteins. SCHEMA algorithm has been applied in the recombinant libraries of distantly related β-lactamases.
