= Biotechnology and Bioengineering =

- Discipline: Biotechnology, bioengineering, biochemical engineering, microbiology
- Language: English
- Edited by: Douglas S. Clark

Publication details
- Former name(s): Journal of Biochemical and Microbiological Technology and Engineering
- History: 1959–present
- Publisher: Wiley
- Frequency: Monthly
- Open access: Hybrid
- Impact factor: 3.5 (2023)

Standard abbreviations
- ISO 4: Biotechnol. Bioeng.

Indexing
- CODEN: BIBIAU
- ISSN: 0006-3592 (print); 1097-0290 (web)
- LCCN: a61005662
- OCLC no.: 1224461
- Journal of Biochemical and Microbiological Technology and Engineering
- ISSN: 0368-1467

Links
- Journal homepage; Online access; Online archive

Biotechnology and Bioengineering is a monthly peer-reviewed scientific journal covering biochemical engineering that was established in 1959. In 2009, the BioMedical & Life Sciences Division of the Special Libraries Association listed Biotechnology and Bioengineering as one of the 100 most influential journals in biology and medicine of the past century.

The journal focuses on applied fundamentals and application of engineering principles to biology-based problems. Initially, fermentation processes, as well as mixing phenomena and aeration with an emphasis on agricultural or food science applications were the major focus. The scale up of antibiotics from fermentation processes was also an active topic of publication.

Elmer L. Gaden was editor-in-chief from its initial publication until 1983. Daniel I.C. Wang and Eleftherios T. Papoutsakis each subsequently held this position. Douglas S. Clark, the current editor-in-chief, has served in this capacity since 1996.

The journal was established as Journal of Biochemical and Microbiological Technology and Engineering by Elmer Gaden, Eric M. Crook, and M. B. Donald and was first published in February 1959. It obtained its current title in 1962. According to the Journal Citation Reports, the journal has a 2023 impact factor of 3.5.
