= Mary Pat Moyer =

American bioengineer

Mary Pat Moyer is an American bioengineer.

Moyer completed her final year of high school during her first year at Stetson University, and later transferred to Florida Atlantic University, where she earned bachelor's and master's degrees in biology in 1972 and 1974, respectively. Moyer specialized in microbiology during her doctoral studies at the University of Texas at Austin, which she completed in 1981. Upon obtaining her doctorate, Moyer joined the University of Texas Health Science Center at San Antonio faculty for two decades. After stepping away from UT Heath San Antonio, Moyer founded the Incell Corporation.

Moyer was elected a member of the United States National Academy of Engineering in 2019.
