= William Howard Arnold (general) =

American military officer (1901–1976)

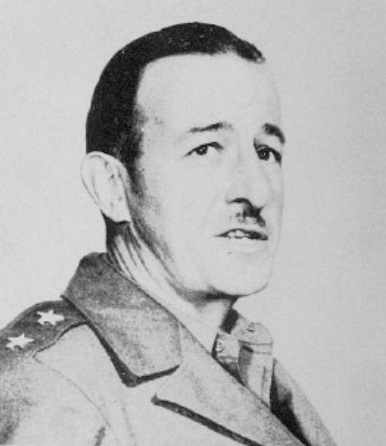
- Arnold as commander of the (Americal) Division in World War II
- Born: January 18, 1901; Dyersburg, Tennessee, US
- Died: September 30, 1976 (aged 75) Lake Forest, Illinois, US
- Allegiance: United States
- Branch: United States Army
- Service years: 1924–1961
- Rank: Lieutenant general
- Commands: Americal Division; Joint Military Mission for Aid to Turkey (JMMAT); U.S. Forces Austria (USFA); 5th United States Army
- Conflicts: Chinese Civil War; World War II; Guadalcanal Campaign; Bougainville Campaign; Philippines Campaign; Occupation of Austria; Korean War
- Awards: Distinguished Service Medal; Silver Star; Legion of Merit; Bronze Star; Air Medal

William Howard Arnold (January 18, 1901 – September 30, 1976) was a lieutenant general in the United States Army.

== Early life ==
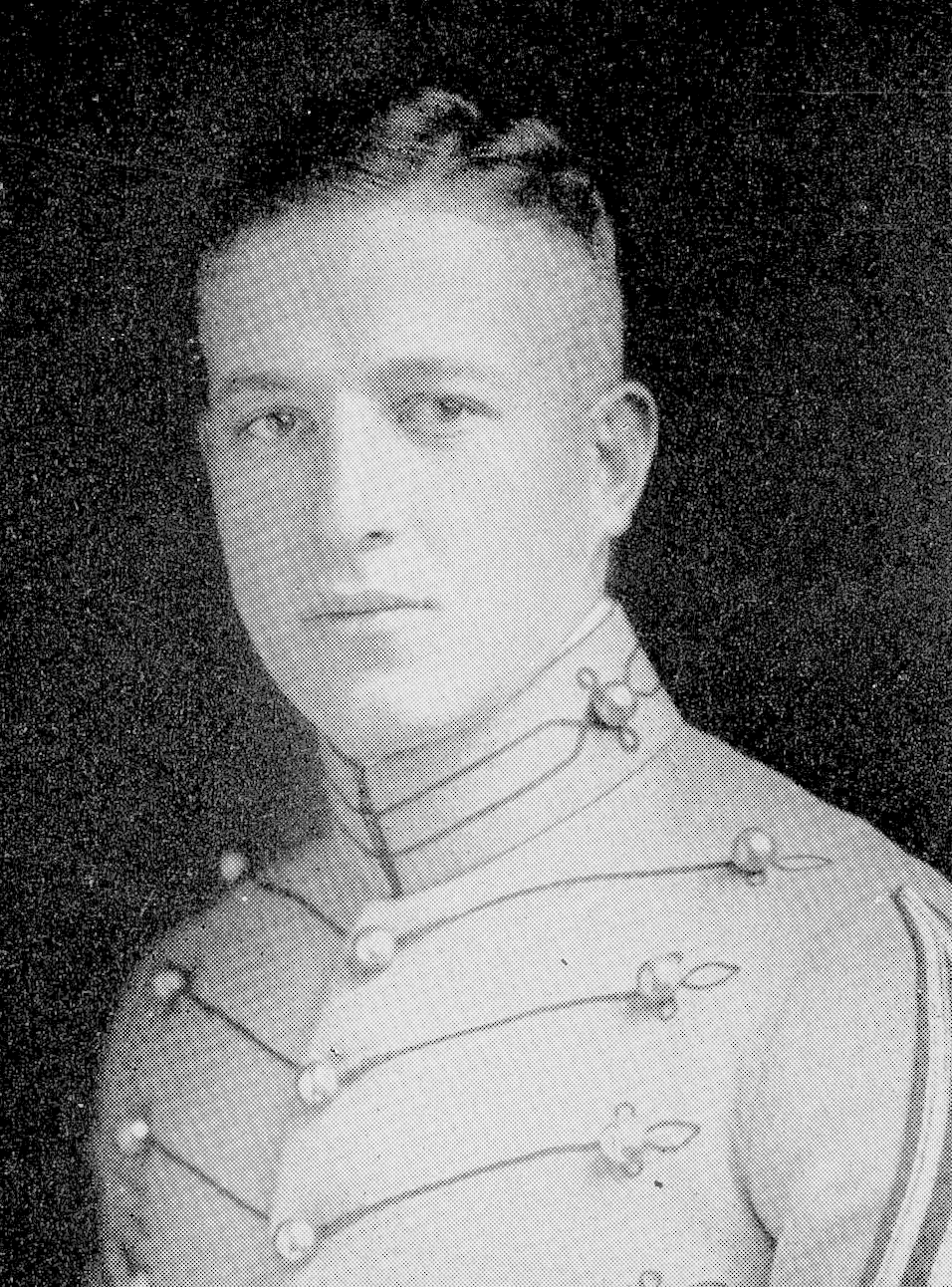
At West Point in 1924

Arnold was born in Dyersburg, Tennessee on January 18, 1901. In 1924 he graduated from the United States Military Academy.

== Early career ==
Assigned to the Infantry, Arnold served in assignments throughout the United States. In 1928 he graduated from the Infantry Officer Course. From 1928 to 1930 he was assigned to Schofield Barracks, Hawaii.

Arnold was assigned as Training and Operations Officer, S-3, for the 15th Infantry Regiment in Tientsin, China from 1934 to 1936.

In 1938 he graduated from the Command and General Staff College.

== World War II ==
From 1942 to 1943 Arnold was Assistant Chief of Staff for Training and Operations, G-3, of the IV Corps, headquartered at Fort Lewis, Washington.

Arnold was promoted to brigadier general in September, 1943 and assigned as Chief of Staff of the XIV Corps, supervising the planning and execution of combat operations in Guadalcanal, New Georgia, and Bougainville.

Arnold was promoted to major general in November, 1944 and assigned to command the 23rd (Americal) Infantry Division. He served until the division was deactivated in December, 1945, leading it during combat operations in the Southern Philippines. In August, 1945 Arnold accepted the surrender of the Japanese occupying Cebu Island.

== Post-World War II ==
Arnold continued his Army service after the war. From 1950 to 1952 he served as commander of the Joint Military Mission for Aid to Turkey (JMMAT).

In 1953 Arnold was assigned as commander, of U.S. Forces Austria, receiving promotion to lieutenant general and serving until 1955.

Arnold was named commander of the 5th United States Army headquartered in Chicago, Illinois in 1955, where he served until his 1961 retirement.

== Awards and decorations ==
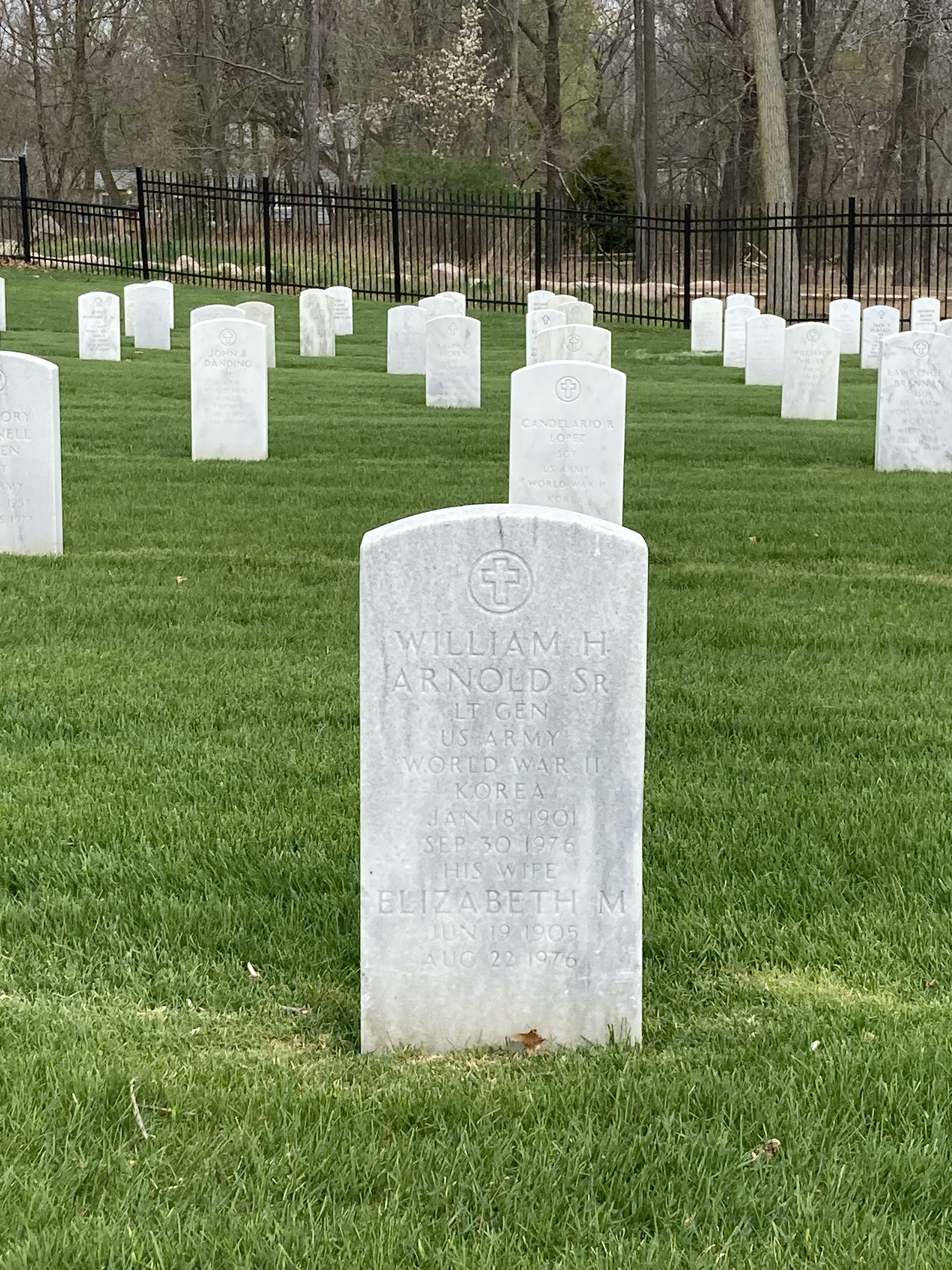
Arnold's grave at Fort Sheridan National Cemetery

General Arnold's honors included multiple awards of the Distinguished Service Medal including two for World War II, the Silver Star, two awards of the Legion of Merit, two Bronze Stars and the Air Medal.

== Family, retirement, and death ==
With his wife, Elizabeth Welsh (Mullen), he was the father of nuclear fuel executive William Howard Arnold, Colonel Joseph Coleman Arnold,(1964 USMA), Elizabeth A Dallman, Emily A Clancy, and the grandfather of Nobel Prize-winning scientist and engineer Frances Arnold.

In retirement Arnold remained in the Chicago area. He died in Lake Forest, Illinois on September 30, 1976. He is buried at Fort Sheridan, Illinois, next to his wife Elizabeth (1905–1976), who was named a Grand Cross Dame of the Order of the Holy Sepulchre in 1955.

Military offices
Preceded by John R. Hodge	Commanding General Americal Division; 1944–1945	Succeeded by Post deactivated
Preceded by Philip Ginder	Commanding General Fifth United States Army; 1955–1960	Succeeded by Lloyd R. Moses
