= Terry Alfriend =

American aerospace engineer (born 1940)

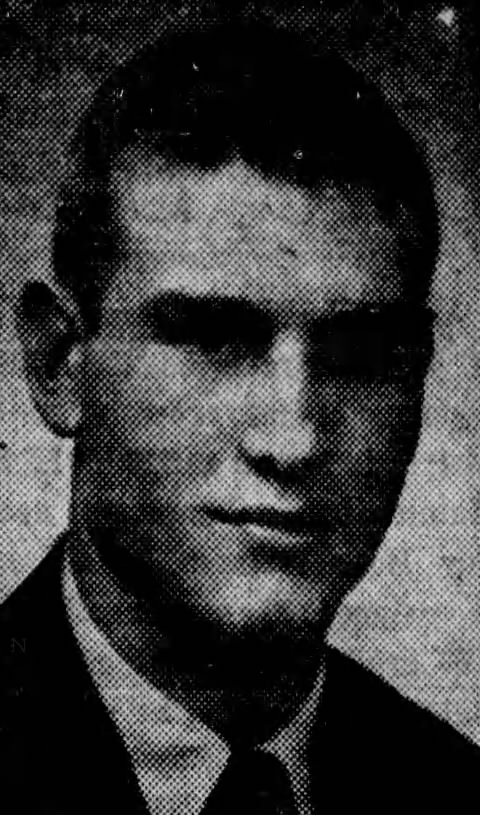
- Alfriend in 1967
- Born: Kyle Terry Alfriend III; 1940 (age 85–86); Macon, Georgia, United States
- Education: Virginia Tech (BS, PhD); Stanford University (MS)
- Engineering career
- Discipline: Aerospace engineering
- Institutions: Cornell University; Naval Postgraduate School; Texas A&M University

Kyle Terry Alfriend III (Note: In The Danville Register, he is variously referred as Kyle T. Alfriend Jr. and Kyle T. Alfriend III, though he is called K. Terry Alfriend III in a Richmond Times-Dispatch obituary for his father.) (born 1940) is an American engineer and professor of aerospace engineering at Texas A&M University (TAMU). He has been a member of the National Academy of Engineering since 1999 and a Regents Professor in the Texas A&M University System since 2024.

Alfriend was born in Macon, Georgia in 1940, though he was raised in Danville, Virginia. He attended Virginia Tech in Blacksburg, Virginia, from which he received a B.S. degree in 1962. He then went to Stanford University, where he attained an M.S. in 1964 before returning to Virginia Tech for his Ph.D., which was awarded in 1967. Both of his degrees from Virginia Tech are in engineering mechanics.

Following his bachelor's degree, Alfriend was employed by Lockheed in California. While there, he received his master's degree from Stanford. He later quit Lockheed and returned to school for a doctorate. In 1967, Alfriend began working at Cornell University as an assistant professor of mechanics.

In 1973, he conducted research at Goddard Space Flight Center before moving the next year to the Naval Research Laboratory. He joined the Central Intelligence Agency's Office of Development and Engineering in 1983, where he worked on the intelligence applications of space systems. Alfriend began working for General Research Corp. in Northern Virginia in 1985.

After nine years, Alfriend was named to a professorship at the Naval Postgraduate School in Monterey, California. In 1996, he began work at Texas A&M University as department head of aerospace engineering in the TAMU College of Engineering and Texas Engineering Experiment Station. In 2001, he stepped down as department head, was named the Wisenbaker II Professor of Aerospace Engineering, and entered full-time research while working from his home in Pebble Beach, California. In 2021, he served the named chair the Jack E. and Frances Brown Chair II. (Note: The Jack E. and Frances Brown Chair I was first held by chemical engineering professor Kenneth R. Hall.) His research spans space domain awareness and the control of spacecraft and satellites. Alfriend and his wife established an endowed scholarship within the TAMU aerospace engineering department in 2023.

Since 2017, Alfriend has been a University Distinguished Professor at TAMU, and since 2024, he has been a Regents Professor, the highest faculty honor of the Texas A&M System.

During his career, Alfriend has received several notable awards. In 1998, he was awarded the Mechanics and Control of Flight Award by the American Institute of Aeronautics and Astronautics (AIAA). In 1999, he was elected a member of the National Academy of Engineering, and in 2015 he was named an honorary fellow of the AIAA. In 2022, the institute awarded Alfriend the Goddard Astronautics Award, for his contributions to "orbital mechanics and space situational awareness". Alfriend, alongside department partner John Junkins, had asteroids named after them in 2025.

From 1992 to 1996, he served as the editor-in-chief of the Journal of Guidance, Control, and Dynamics, which is published by the AIAA. Before that, he was editor-in-chief of The Journal of the Astronautical Sciences, published by Springer Nature for the American Astronautical Society (AAS); he was honored with a special AAS symposium in 2010 and a special issue of the journal in 2014.
