= Genomatica =

American biotechnology company

- Type: Private
- Founded: 1 January 2000
- Headquarters: San Diego, California
- Key people: Christophe Schilling, Ph.D., (CEO); John G. Gugel (President); Carlos A. Cabrera (Executive Chairman); Nelson Barton (Research and Development)
- Website: genomatica.com

Genomatica was a San Diego–based biotechnology company that develops and licenses biological manufacturing processes for the production of intermediate and basic chemicals. Genomatica’s process technology for the chemical 1,4-Butanediol (BDO) is now commercial. Its GENO BDO process has been licensed by BASF and by Novamont.

== History ==
Genomatica was founded in San Diego in 1998 by Christophe Schilling and Bernhard Palsson. Schilling's goal was to use biotechnology to make more sustainable choices in manufacturing. In 2021, Lululemon partnered with Genomatica to create a plant-based nylon material, which was launched in 2023. Genomatica produced 5 million pounds of renewable BDO in five weeks at a DuPont Tate & Lyle plant in Tennessee.

In 2019, Genomatica acquired assets from the life sciences division of Renewable Energy Group.

In 2023, L'Oréal, along with Unilever and Kao Corporation invested in Genomatica. The investment will go toward developing plant-based personal care and cosmetics products.

In October 2025, Genomatica entered a partnership with Sojitz Corporation to accelerate the commercialization of plant-based nylon-6.

In August 2026, it was announced that Again is acquiring Genomatica to combine the Again carbon dioxide to chemical platform with the Genomatica 1,4-Butanediol (BDO) production and engineering expertise.
