= Harvey Blanch =

Australian chemical engineer

Harvey Warren Blanch (born 17 January 1947) is an Australian-American chemical engineer.

Blanch earned his Bachelor of Science at the University of Sydney in 1968, and completed a PhD at the University of New South Wales in 1971. He taught at the University of California, Berkeley as the Merck Professor of Biochemical Engineering, and was granted emeritus status in retirement.

Blanch is a 1992 fellow of the American Institute for Medical and Biological Engineering, and a 2005 member of the United States National Academy of Engineering. In 2010, Blanch received James E. Bailey Award from the American Institute of Chemical Engineers' Society for Biological Engineering.
