= Michael Levin (biologist) =

American developmental and synthetic biologist

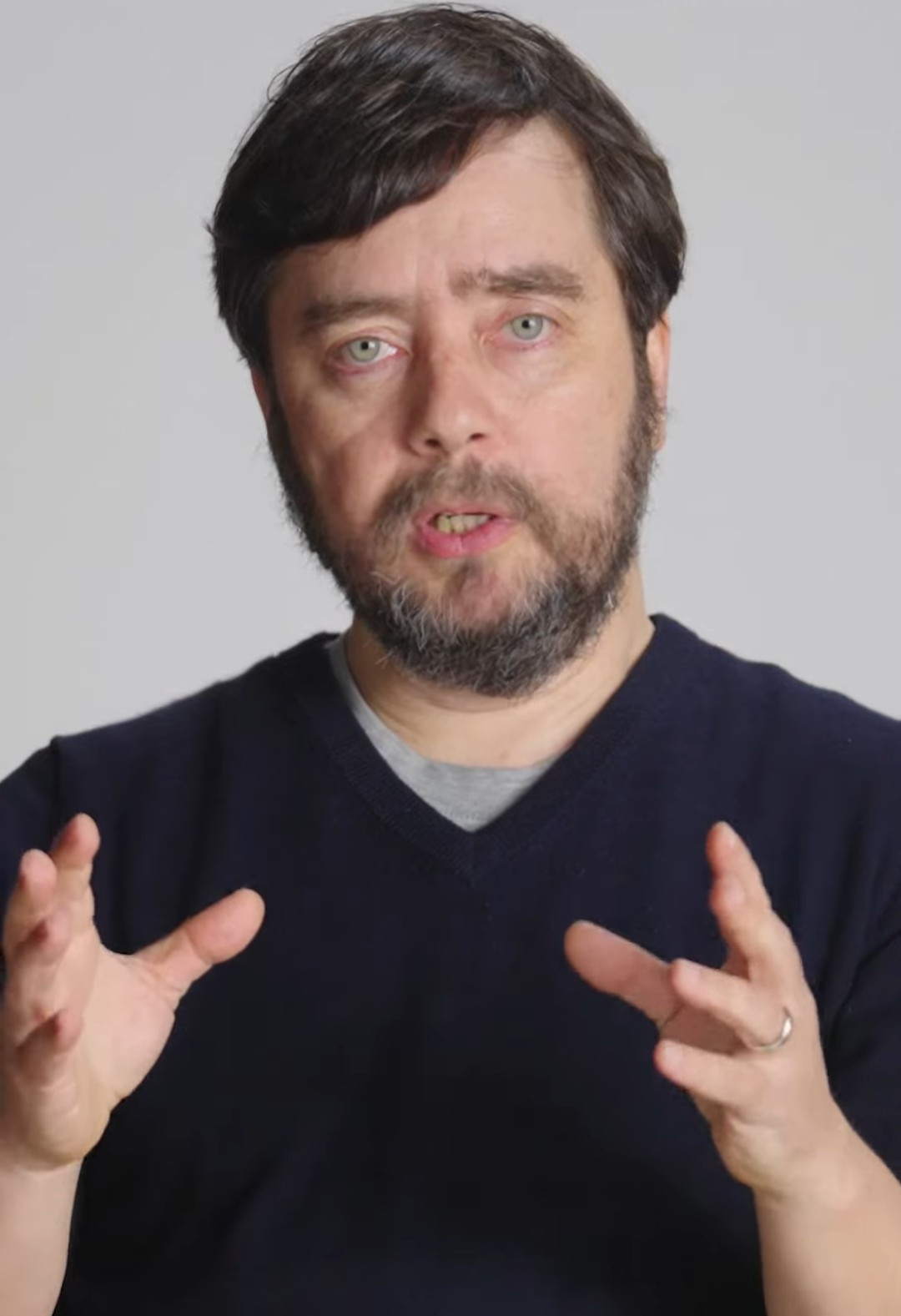
- Levin in 2024
- Born: 1969 (age 56–57)
- Education: Tufts University (BS); Harvard University (PhD)
- Known for: Left-right asymmetry, bioelectricity, morphogenesis, xenobots
- Awards: Cozzarelli prize (2020)
- Scientific career
- Fields: Developmental biology, synthetic biology
- Workplaces: Forsyth Institute; Tufts University; Wyss Institute; Harvard Medical School
- Doctoral advisor: Clifford Tabin
- Website: www.drmichaellevin.org

Michael Levin is an American developmental and synthetic biologist. He is a professor of biomedical engineering and the Vannevar Bush Distinguished Professor of Biology at Tufts University, where he is the director of the Allen Discovery Center and the Tufts Center for Regenerative and Developmental Biology. He is also co-director of the Institute for Computationally Designed Organisms with Josh Bongard.

== Early life ==
Michael Levin was born in Moscow, USSR, in 1969, into a Jewish family. His parents faced antisemitism in the Soviet Union, and in 1978 took advantage of a visa program for Soviet Jews and moved the family to Lynn, Massachusetts. Levin's father was a computer programmer and worked for the Soviet weather service; his mother was a concert pianist.

Levin's family immigration was sponsored by Temple Sinai in Marblehead, Massachusetts. His family is still members of Temple Sinai. Levin stated that "... I've always lived within about a mile radius of where we landed in '78."

In 1986, at 17 years old, Levin read Robert O. Becker's book The Body Electric, which focused on the intersection between bioelectricity and medicine. This was something Levin said looked like "everything I was thinking about" at the time, discovering that the medical interest in electricity was thousands of years old. This would inspire his later interest and research into bioelectricity and related topics.

== Career ==
Levin received dual bachelor's degrees in computer science and biology from Tufts University, and a Ph.D. in genetics from Harvard University (working in the lab of Clifford Tabin). His post-doctoral training was in the Cell Biology department of Harvard School of Medicine with Mark Mercola. Levin first established his independent lab at the Forsyth Institute in 2000. His research interests include: bioelectrical signals by which cells communicate to serve the dynamic anatomical needs of the organism during development, regeneration, and cancer suppression; basal cognition and intelligence in diverse unconventional substrates; and top-down control of form and function across scales in biology. He moved his group to Tufts in 2009. In 2010, he also became an associate member of the Wyss Institute for Biologically Inspired Engineering at Harvard Medical School.

He was appointed to the Vannevar Bush endowed Chair in 2011 and received the IFESS Scientist of Vision Award in 2012.

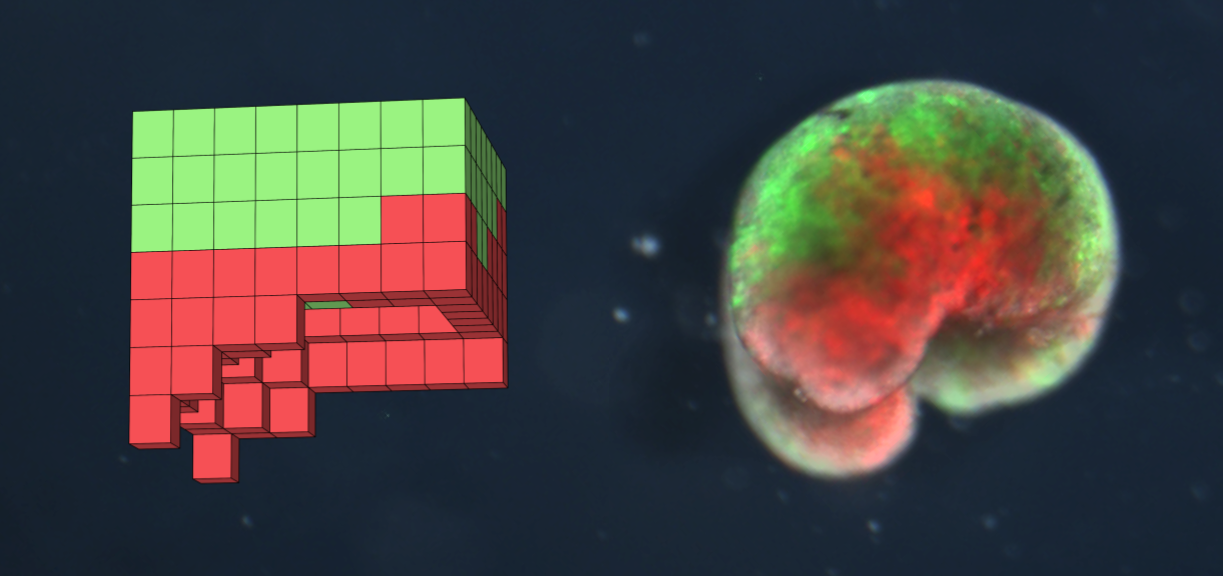
A xenobot design discovered in simulation (left) and the deployed organism (right) built from frog skin (green) and heart muscle (red).

He is known for co-discovering xenobots, "living robots made from frog skin cells [that] can sense their environment". This research is focused on development of a multiplexed, microfluidic, Xenopus embryo culture system that will enable discovery of new drug targets and development of therapeutics when combined with multiomics and an integrated bioinformatics pipeline. This work was funded by the DARPA L2M program.

As of 2021, Levin's lab is working on synthetic biology applications of bioelectricity for cellular control; development of a bioinformatics of shape, AI tools for discovery and testing of algorithmic models linking molecular-genetic data to morphogenesis; using techniques from AI, computational neuroscience, and cognitive science to make models of morphogenesis.

In 2004, Levin's work on the molecular basis of left-right asymmetry (Cell 1995) was chosen by the journal Nature as a "Milestone in Developmental Biology in the last century". Levin is co-editor in chief of Bioelectricity, founding associate editor of Collective Intelligence, and is on the editorial advisory board of Laterality journals.
