= Artificial reproduction =

Creation of new life by other than the natural means available to an organism

Artificial reproduction is the re-creation of life brought about by means other than natural ones. It is new life built by human plans and projects. Examples include artificial selection, artificial insemination, in vitro fertilization, artificial womb, artificial cloning, and kinematic replication.

Artificial reproduction is one aspect of artificial life. Artificial reproduction can be categorized into one of two classes according to its capacity to be self-sufficient: non-assisted reproductive technology and assisted reproductive technology.

Cutting plants' stems and placing them in compost is a form of assisted artificial reproduction, xenobots are an example of a more autonomous type of reproduction, while the artificial womb presented in the movie the Matrix illustrates a non assisted hypothetical technology. The idea of artificial reproduction has led to various technologies.

== Theology ==
Humans have aspired to create life since immemorial times. Most theologies and religions have conceived this possibility as exclusive of deities. Christian religions consider the possibility of artificial reproduction, in most cases, as heretical and sinful.

== Philosophy ==
Although ancient Greek philosophy raised the concept that man could imitate the creative capacity of nature, classic Greeks thought that if possible, human beings would reproduce things as nature does, and vice versa, nature would do the things that man does in the same way. Aristotle, for example, wrote that if nature made tables, it would make them just as men do. In other words, Aristotle said that if nature were to create a table, such table will look like a human-made table. Correspondingly, Descartes envisioned the human body, and nature, as a machine. Cartesian philosophy does not stop seeing a perfect mirror between nature and the artificial.

However, Kant revolutionized this old idea by criticizing such naturalism. Kant pedagogically wrote:

"Reason, in order to be taught by nature, must approach nature with its principles in one hand, according to which the agreement among appearances can count as laws, and, in the other hand, the experiment thought out in accord with these principles—in order to be instructed by nature not like a pupil, who has recited to him whatever the teacher wants to say, but like an appointed judge who compels witnesses to answer the questions he puts to them.".

Humans are not instructed by nature but rather use nature as raw material to invent. Humans find alternatives to the natural restrictions imposed by natural laws thus, nature is not necessarily mirrored. In accordance with Kant (and contrary to what Aristotle thought) Karl Marx, Alfred Whitehead, Jaques Derrida and Juan David García Bacca noticed that nature is incapable of reproducing tables; or airplanes, or submarines, or computers. If nature tried to create airplanes, it would produce birds. If nature tried to create submarines, it would get fishes. If nature tried to create computers, brains would grow. And if nature tried to create man, modern man, monkeys will be evolved. According to Whitehead, if we look for something natural in artificial life, in the most elaborate cases, if anything, only atoms remain natural. Juan David Garcia Bacca summarized,

“It will not come out from wood, it will not be born, a galley; from clay, a vessel; from linen, a dress; from iron, a lever,...From natural, artificial. In the artificial, the natural is reduced to a simple raw material, even though it is perfectly specified with natural specification. The artificial is the real, positive, and original negation of the natural: of species, of genus and of essence. Thus, its ontology is superior to natural ontology. And for this very reason Marx did not attach any importance to Darwin, whose evolutionism is confined to the natural order: to changes, at most, from variety to variety, from species to species... natural. For the same reason, nature has no dialectics, even though continuous evolution and selection can occur. The dialectic cannot emerge from the natural, for deeper reasons than, using today's terms, from a bird, an airplane cannot emerge; from fish, a submarine; from ears, a telephone; from eyes, a television; from a brain, a digital computer; from feet, a car; from hands, an engine; from Euclid, Descartes; from Aristotle, Newton; from Plato, Marx.”

According to García Bacca, the major difference between natural causes and artificial causes is that nature does not have plans and projects, while humans design things following plans and projects.

In contrast, other influential authors such as Michael Behe have depicted the concept and promoted the idea of intelligent design, a notion that has aroused several doubts and heated controversies, as it reframe natural causes in accordance with a natural plan. Previous ideas that have also provided a positive 'sense' to natural reproduction, are orthogenesis, syntropy, orgone and morphic resonance, among others. Although, these ideas have been historically marginalized and often called pseudoscience, recently Bio-semioticians are reconsidering some of them under symbolic approaches.

Current metaphysics of science actually recognizes that the artificial ways of reproduction are diverse from nature, i.e., unnatural, anti-natural or supernatural. Because Biosemiotics does not focus on the function of life but on its meaning, it has a better understanding of the artificial than classic biology.

== Science ==
Biology, being the study of cellular life, addresses reproduction in terms of growth and cellular division (i.e., binary fission, mitosis and meiosis); however, the science of artificial reproduction is not restricted by the mirroring of these natural processes.The science of artificial reproduction is actually transcending the natural forms, and natural rules, of reproduction. For example, xenobots have redefined the classical conception of reproduction. Although xenobots are made of eukariotic cells they do not reproduce by mitosis, but rather by kinematic replication. Such constructive replication does not involve growing but rather building.

== Assisted reproductive technologies ==
Assisted reproductive technology (ART)'s purpose is to assist the development of a human embryo, commonly because of medical concerns due to fertility limitations.

== Non-assisted reproductive technologies ==
Non-assisted reproductive technologies (NART) could have medical motivations but are mostly driven by a wider heterotopic ambition. Although, NARTs are initially designed by humans, they are programed to become independent of humans to a relative or absolute extent. James Lovelock proposed that such novelties could overcome humans.

=== Artificial cloning ===
Cloning is the cellular reproductive processes where two or more genetically identical organisms are created, either by natural or artificial means. Artificial cloning normally involves editing the genetic code, somatic cell nuclear transfer and 3D bioprinting.

=== Non-assisted artificial womb ===
A non-assisted artificial womb or artificial uterus is a device that allow for ectogenesis or extracorporeal pregnancy by growing an embryonic form outside the body of an organism (that would normally carry the embryo to term) without any human assistance. The aspect of non-assistance is the key distinction between the current artificial womb technology (AWT) in modern medical research, which still relies on human assistance. With this non-assisted hypothetical technology, a zygote or stem cells are used to create an embryo that is then incubated and monitored by artificial intelligence (AI) within a chamber composed of biocompatible material. The AI maintains the necessary conditions for the embryo to develop and thrive, proceeding to mimic organic labor and childbirth in order to best help the embryo adjust to the outside world.

Ectogenesis—gestation, depicted in the science fiction movie The Matrix, is a fast approaching reality. This type of innovation presupposes that vertebrate wombs are not the only way for bearing humans or other similar forms of life.

=== Kinematic replication ===
Self-replication without binary fission, meiosis, mitosis (or any other form of cellular reproduction that involves division and growing) can be achieved. Xenobots are an example of kinematic replication. They are biobots, named after the African clawed frog (Xenopus laevis). Xenobots are cellular life forms designed by using artificial intelligence to build more of themselves by combining frog cells in a liquid medium.

The term kinematic replication is usually reserved for biomolecules (e.g. DNA, RNA, prions, etc.) and artificially designed cellular forms (e.g. xenobots).

=== Machine constructive replication ===
Machine constructive replication mimics human traditional manufacturing but is entirely self-automated. Such constructive replication is a more general form of kinematic replication, which does not necessarily includes bio-molecular or cellular forms. This technology also includes non-organic forms of life such as robots, cyborgs and artificial intelligence reproduction. Constructive replication, as kinematic replication, does not involve growing. In nature growing is required for cellular reproduction, where a cell grows before it splits in two daughters cells. Examples of cellular division are binary fission, mitosis and meiosis; these natural reproductive processes require growing, however constructive replication does not require growing but rather a non-human subject performing the construction of more of itself by using available raw materials.

In computational terms, constructive replication is understood as a multi-step process which involves self-learning algorithms to assemble machines, and it could involve machines collecting resources. Each machine is created with a neural-network "brain" that can learn and adapt based on information it gathers. That machine's goal is then to manufacture more of itself in the best way it can come up with.

Such automated constructive replication involves the notion of inheritance and learning tasks, as machines create an exact copy of themselves through a blueprint that has been passed on to them. Each machine then learns over time, making modifications to its software and its blueprint for future machines' hardware. It then passes on that modified blueprint to the machines it creates or helps create.

=== Consciousness amplification ===
Amplification of an existing consciousness is a hypothetical technology. The reproduction of AI is currently part of an innovative human project, involving code and the amplification of that code. In other terms, the reproduction could come from information the AI collected across the Internet.

== See also ==
- Male Pregnancy
- Artificial Uterus
- In Vitro Fertilization
- Xenobot
- Fertilization
- Pregnancy
- The concept of nature sensu Marx
- Juan David García Bacca
