= GPATCH2L =

Protein-coding gene in the species Homo sapiens

Identifiers
- Aliases: GPATCH2L, C14orf118, G-patch domain containing 2 like
- External IDs: MGI: 1917623; GeneCards: GPATCH2L

Gene location (Human)
| Chr. | Chromosome 14 (human) |
| Band | 14q24.3 | Start | 76,151,916 bp |
| Band | 14q24.3 | End | 76,254,342 bp |

Gene location (Mouse)
| Chr. | Chromosome 12 (mouse) |
| Band | 12|12 D2 | Start | 86,288,632 bp |
| Band | 12|12 D2 | End | 86,338,558 bp |
RNA expression pattern
| Bgee | Human / Mouse (ortholog); Top expressed in: buccal mucosa cell; epithelium of colon; monocyte; tail of epididymis; Achilles tendon; testicle; stromal cell of endometrium; ganglionic eminence; right testis; corpus epididymis / Top expressed in: lumbar subsegment of spinal cord; granulocyte; secondary oocyte; spermatocyte; hand; substantia nigra; zygote; primary oocyte; cerebellar vermis; superior cervical ganglion; More reference expression data |
| BioGPS | n/a |
Orthologs
| Databases | NCBI: entry; OMA: entry |
| Species | Human | Mouse |
| Entrez | 55668 | 70373 |
| Ensembl | ENSG00000089916 | ENSMUSG00000021254 |
| UniProt | Q9NWQ4 | Q6PE65 |
| RefSeq (mRNA) | NM_017926; NM_017972; NM_001322026; NM_001322027; NM_001322028 NM_001322029; NM_001322030; NM_001322031; NM_001322032 | NM_027405; NM_001324488 |
| RefSeq (protein) | NP_001308955; NP_001308956; NP_001308957; NP_001308958; NP_001308959 NP_001308960; NP_001308961; NP_060396; NP_060442 | NP_001311417; NP_081681 |
| Location (UCSC) | Chr 14: 76.15 – 76.25 Mb | Chr 12: 86.29 – 86.34 Mb |
| PubMed search |
- Wikidata
| View/Edit Human | View/Edit Mouse |

GPATCH2L (G-Patch Domain Containing 2 Like) is a protein that is encoded by the GPATCH2L human gene located at 14q24.3. In humans, the length of mRNA in GPATCH2L (NM_017926) is 14,021 base pairs and the gene spans bases is 62,422 nt between chr14: 76,151,922 - 76,214,343. GPATCH2L is on the positive strand. IFT43 is the gene directly before GPATCH2L on the positive strand and LOC105370575 is the uncharacterized gene on the negative strand, which is approximately one and a half the size of GPATCH2L. Known aliases for GPATCH2L contain C14orf118, FLJ20689, FLJ10033, and KIAA1152. GPATCH2L produces 28 distinct introns (27 gt-ag, 1 gc-ag), 17 different mRNAs, 14 alternatively spliced variants, and 3 unspliced forms. It has 5 probable alternative promoters, 7 validated polyadenylation sites, and 6 predicted promoters of varying lengths.

== Transcript variants ==
There are 23 different transcript variants in GPATCH2L Homo sapiens. The most common is transcript variant 1 and each transcript variant uses different exons.

Exon usages of 23 transcript variants of GPATCH2L Homo sapiens from NCBI Gene.

23 Transcript Variants of GPATCH2L Homo sapiens from NCBI Gene.
| Name | Accession number | # of Exons | Size (bp) |
|---|---|---|---|
| Transcript Variant 1 | NM_017926 | 10 | 14,021 |
| Transcript Variant 2 | NM_017972 | 9 | 12,396 |
| Transcript Variant 3, non-coding RNA | NR_110314 | 10 | 12,511 |
| Transcript Variant 4 | NM_001322026 | 7 | 3,263 |
| Transcript Variant 5 | NM_001322027 | 4 | 4,485 |
| Transcript Variant 6 | NM_001322028 | 10 | 1,797 |
| Transcript Variant 7 | NM_001322029 | 9 | 1,825 |
| Transcript Variant 8 | NM_001322030 | 10 | 3,232 |
| Transcript Variant 9 | NM_001322031 | 3 | 5,278 |
| Transcript Variant 10 | NM_001322032 | 7 | 3,014 |
| Transcript Variant X1 | XM_017021427 | 11 | 14,388 |
| Transcript Variant X2 | XM_017021428 | 11 | 14,373 |
| Transcript Variant X3 | XM_017021429 | 11 | 3,472 |
| Transcript Variant X4 | XM_006720191 | 10 | 14,146 |
| Transcript Variant X5 | XM_017021430 | 11 | 3,457 |
| Transcript Variant X6 | XM_017021431 | 11 | 2,927 |
| Transcript Variant X7 | XM_017021432 | 11 | 2,924 |
| Transcript Variant X8 | XM_017021433 | 10 | 2,685 |
| Transcript Variant X9 | XR_001750414 | 10 | 14,302 |
| Transcript Variant X10 | XR_001750415 | 10 | 2,841 |
| Transcript Variant X11 | XR_001750416 | 10 | 3,386 |
| Transcript Variant X12 | XR_001750417 | 12 | 1,758 |
| Transcript Variant X13 | XR_001750418 | 12 | 14,488 |

== Protein ==
The GPATCH2L human protein (NP_060396) has a molecular weight of 54,260 Da and consists of 482 amino acids with a predicted isoelectric point of 8.77. It has 17 different isoforms and the most common is isoform 1. Every human GPATCH2L isoform has a GPATCH2L domain, but no other significant smaller repeats were found as be seen in the schematic illustration below. Also, human GPATCH2L protein in prostate tissue reveals distinct positivity in glandular cells, according to immunohistochemical staining of human prostate GPATCH2L Antibody (HPA018856) in IHC from The Human Protein Atlas.

Schematic illustration of GPATCH2L human protein was created by using Illustrater for BioSequence (IBS) tool from GPS, including the domain, disordered region, nuclear localization signal (NLS) regions, phosphorylation, phosphothreonine, O-GalNAc (mucin-type) glycosylation, 0-(beta)-GlcNAc, N-glycosylation, and O-Glycosylation sites.

17 isoforms of GPATCH2L Homo sapiens protein from NCBI Gene.
| Name | Accession number | Size (aa) |
|---|---|---|
| Isoform 1 | NP_060396 | 482 |
| Isoform 2 | NP_060442 | 477 |
| Isoform 4 | NP_001308955 | 434 |
| Isoform 5 | NP_001308956 | 304 |
| Isoform 6 | NP_001308957 | 447 |
| Isoform 7 | NP_001308958 | 446 |
| Isoform 8 | NP_001308959 | 469 |
| Isoform 9 | NP_001308960 | 271 |
| Isoform 10 | NP_001308961 | 402 |
| Isoform X1 | XP_016876916 | 495 |
| Isoform X2 | XP_016876917 | 490 |
| Isoform X3 | XP_016876918 | 482 |
| Isoform X4 | XP_006720254 | 477 |
| Isoform X5 | XP_016876919 | 477 |
| Isoform X6 | XP_016876920 | 460 |
| Isoform X7 | XP_016876921 | 459 |
| Isoform X8 | XP_016876922 | 442 |

=== Secondary and tertiary structure ===
Two figures show the predicted tertiary structure of GPATCH2L human protein from AlphaFold. Four Alpha helix bundles and two Beta sheets are observable and these are annotated on conceptual translation.

The GPATCH2L domain annotated in yellow is shown on the predicted tertiary structure from AlphaFold by using iCn3D viewer from NCBI.

=== Interacting proteins ===
GPATCH2L human protein is known to interact with KRR1, DDX10, and NOL6 within the nucleolus and nucleus.

Predicted interacting proteins of GPATCH2L Homo sapiens from STRING.
| Name | Full Name | Function | Cell's Compartment | Experimental Validation | String-db Score |
|---|---|---|---|---|---|
| KRR1 | KRR1 small subunit processome component homolog | 1) Nucleolar protein required for rRNA synthesis and ribosomal assembly. 2) it enables RNA and protein binding. 3) it is required for 40S ribosome biogenesis in the nucleolus. | Nucleolus | Experiments: 1) Detected by two-hybrid array assay. 2) Detected by affinity chromatography technology assay. 3) Detected by inferred by author assay. 4) Detected by tandem affinity purification assay. | 0.650 |
| DDX10 | Probable ATP-dependent RNA helicase DDX10 | 1) it promotes AIM2-inflammasome activation by maintaining AIM2 protein stability. 2) it promotes human lung carcinoma proliferation by U3 small nucleolar ribonucleoprotein IMP4 | Nucleus | Experiments: 1) Detected by two-hybrid array assay. 2) Detected by inferred by author assay. 3) Detected by tandem affinity purification assay. | 0.548 |
| NOL6 | Nucleolar protein 6 | A nucleolar RNA-associated protein; 1) it is related to ribosome biogenesis in endometrial cancer. 2) it promotes the proliferation and migration of endometrial cancer cells by regulating TWIST1 expression. | Nucleus | Experiments: 1) Detected by two-hybrid array assay. 2) Detected by inferred by author assay. 3) Detected by tandem affinity purification assay. | 0.527 |

== Gene level regulation ==
=== Promoter ===
GPATCH2L human gene has a promoter [GXP_207451] located in ch14:76150912 - 76151972. The length of the promoter is 1061 bp.

=== Transcription factor binding sites ===
In the below table, 5 transcription factors [KLFS, HOMF, SP1F, ZF02, and NFKB] are predicted to bind within a conserved section of the transcriptional regulatory region. Unlike 19 transcription factors in the table, MAZF is only specifically active in cartilage and skeleton tissues. Also, PLAG is only specifically active in bone marrow cells, digestive system, embryonic structures, endocrine system, germ cells, and hematopoietic system. Most transcription factors are active in the ovary, lung, brain, prostate, bone marrow cells, which show the highest values in RNA-seq data from the Gene database record at NCBI.

The multiple sequence alignment of GPATCH2L mammals shows NFKB is the most conserved transcription factor.

Detailed information about 20 transcription factors in human GPATCH2L from Genomatix.
| Element | Description/Full Name | The Best Matrix Score | The Number of Binding Sites in The Region |
|---|---|---|---|
| AP1F | AP1, Activating protein 1 | 0.903 | 1 |
| NR2F | Nuclear receptor subfamily 2 factors | 0.826 | 5 |
| LHXF | Lim homeodomain factors | 0.906 | 3 |
| STAT | Signal transducer and activator of transcription | 0.896 | 2 |
| HIFF | Hypoxia inducible factor, bHLH/PAS protein family | 0.989 | 5 |
| HESF | Vertebrate homologues of enhancer of split complex | 0.985 | 2 |
| KLFS | Krueppel like transcription factors | 0.912 | 13 |
| GLIF | GLI zinc finger family | 0.914 | 5 |
| PLAG | Pleomorphic adenoma gene | 0.845 | 4 |
| SP1F | GC-Box factors SP1/GC | 0.855 | 9 |
| EGRF | EGR/nerve growth factor-induced protein C & related factors | 0.930 | 4 |
| HOMF | Homeodomain transcription factors | 0.980 | 5 |
| CAAT | CCAAT binding factors | 0.926 | 1 |
| AP2F | Activator protein 2 | 0.917 | 1 |
| ZF02 | C2H2 zinc finger transcription factors 2 | 0.932 | 3 |
| RXRF | RXR heterodimer binding sites | 0.850 | 9 |
| SMAD | Vertebrate SMAD family of transcription factors | 0.994 | 2 |
| CREB | cAMP-responsive element binding proteins | 0.844 | 6 |
| NFKB | Nuclear factor kappa B/c-rel | 0.928 | 4 |
| MAZF | Myc associated zinc fingers | 1.000 | 3 |

== Transcript level regulation ==
=== Expression Pattern ===
RNA-seq was performed on tissue samples from 95 human individuals representing 27 different tissues to identify tissue-specificity protein-coding genes at NCBI. RNA-seq data shows high expression within the bone marrow, testis, and brain tissue in GPATCH2L human mRNA. Tissues with low expression are the pancreas, liver, and salivary glands.

=== NCBI GEO profile across all tissues ===
Human GPATCH2L mRNA level in lung carcinoma and all normal tissues, including lung tissue, on average from NCBI GEO.

Significantly different gene expressions in tissues are shown in a microarray-assessed tissue expression pattern (GDS596) in GPATCH2L Homo sapiens from NCBI GEO. The high gene expressions in cerebellum, fetal brain, bone marrow, ovary, prostate, and lung tissues in RNA-seq data are extremely low in GDS596. However, the gene expressions in liver, pancreas, salivary gland, and fetal liver tissues remain low in every gene database record.

A graph in NCBI GEO can be interpreted as follows: a 'single channel' sample means that a hybridization where cDNA obtained from one biosource is combined with the array. This method is typically used for membrane (filter) arrays with radionucleotide labels and high-density oligonucleotide arrays with fluorescent labels. This experiment type makes the measurements of gene expression, which are defined as scaled/normalized signal count values that correspond to "value" in the below tables and right figures.

Three highest values among 158 samples in a microarray-assessed tissue expression pattern (GDS596) in GPATCH2L Homo sapiens from NCBI GEO.
| Sample/Tissue | Title | Value | Rank |
|---|---|---|---|
| GSM19012 / (Superior Cervical Ganglion) | 3AJZ02081478b_Superior_Cervical_Ganglion | 1408.7 | 81 |
| GSM19014 / (Skeletal Muscle) | 3AJZ02083092b_Skeletal_Muscle_Psoas | 819.2 | 83 |
| GSM19009 / (Dorsal Root Ganglion) | 3ARS02080736e_DRG | 787.4 | 81 |

Three lowest values among 158 samples in a microarray-assessed tissue expression pattern (GDS596) in GPATCH2L Homo Sapiens from NCBI GEO.
| Sample/Tissue | Title | Value | Rank |
|---|---|---|---|
| GSM18875 / (PB-CD 56+NK cells) / (Superior Cervical Ganglion) | 3AMH02082109_PB_CD56NKCells | 10.1 | 19 |
| GSM18969 / (Cardiac Myocytes) | 3AJZ02053107_CardiacMyocytes | 10.1 | 12 |
| GSM18881 / (PB - CD 19 + B cells) | 3AMH02082107_PB_CD19BCells | 10.5 | 28 |

=== Predicted stem-loops and miRNA targeting ===
The nucleic acid secondary structure of human GPATCH2L (5'UTR) shows one stem-loop, inframe stop codon, start codon, and exon boundaries. In this stem-loop, g and g are not connected. However, these are conserved in the multiple sequence alignment of this stem-loop region. In the 3'UTR figure, there are 10 stem-loops and these are zoomed in another figure. Although 3-3), 3-6), 3-9) show weird structure (3: CCTT, 6: CAT, TTC, 9:GTG), every letter is conserved in its multiple sequence alignment. Especially, 3-8) includes hsa-miRNA-205 in its stem-loop, and every letter of hsa-miRNA-205 is conserved in the multiple sequence alignment.

== Protein level regulation ==
=== Immunochemistry (IHC) ===
GPATCH2L protein is highly expressed in the bone marrow tissues, according to immunohistochemical staining of human hematopoietic cells in bone marrow tissue GPATCH2L Antibody (HPA018856) in IHC from The Human Protein Atlas. Also, it has shown that GPATCH2L protein is highly expressed in human respiratory epithelial cells in bronchus tissue and human cells in endometrial stroma and glandular cells in endometrium tissue.

=== Protein localization and abundance ===
GPATCH2L Homo sapiens protein is mainly localized to the nucleoplasm, according to GPATCH2L antibody staining from The Human Protein Atlas and Thermo Fisher Scientific. Also, 82.6% of GPATCH2L human protein is predicted to be located in the nucleus, according to PSORT II and pI/MW tool from Expasy. GPATCH2L human protein is Isoleucine poor (I−), Serine rich (S+), and Arginine rich (R+) compared to other human proteins. The post-translational modification sites [O-GalNAc (mucin-type) glycosylation, 0-(beta)-GlcNAc, N-glycosylation, O-glycosylation, and phosphorylation] are annotated on the conceptual translation. The conceptual translation figures in Wikipedia only include 1,560 bp mRNA and 482 amino acids.

Human GPATCH2L isoform 1 (NM_017926.4) annotated conceptual translation 1

Human GPATCH2L isoform 1 (NM_017926.4) annotated conceptual translation 2

== Homology and evolution ==
=== Orthologs and paralogs ===
GPATCH2L Homo sapiens has orthologs in Mammalia, Reptilia, Amphibia, Mollusca, Arthropoda, Ave, Fish, and Invertebrate. The values [query cover values (%), sequence identity (%), and sequence similarity (%)] decrease as the group changes into more distant orthologs from Homo sapiens, such as Invertebrates. However, frogs are unusual in that they have a very low sequence identity (36.8% - 38.0%). Also, the class of fungi and bacteria that contain GPATCH2L homologs was not able to be found using NCBI Homologene. The paralogs of GPATCH2L Homo sapiens were found by using NCBI Homologene. In the below table, MYA stands for "Million Years Ago" and the equation of the corrected divergence [m] is 100*(-LN(sequence similarity(%)).

20 different orthologs of GPATCH2L that include Mammalia, Reptiles, Birds, Amphibians, Fish, and Invertebrates.
| GPATCH2L | Genus, Species | Common name | Taxonomic group | Divergence Date (MYA) | Accession number | Query Cover | Sequence length (aa) | Sequence identity (%) ! !Sequence similarity (%) | Corrected Divergence [m] | |
|---|---|---|---|---|---|---|---|---|---|---|
| Mammalia | Homo sapiens | Human | Primates | 0 | NP_060396.2 | 100.0% | 482 | 100.0% | 100.0% | 0 |
| Mammalia | Mus musculus | House Mouse | Rodentia | 90 | XP_006516282.1 | 100.0% | 490 | 86.1% | 90.0% | 10.5 |
| Mammalia | Ursus arctos horribilis | Grizzly Bear | Carnivora | 94 | XP_026375234.1 | 93.8% | 479 | 93.8% | 95.4% | 4.7 |
| Mammalia | Equus caballus | Horse | Perissodactyla | 94 | XP_023483915.1 | 94.8% | 482 | 86.1% | 90.0% | 10.5 |
| Reptiles | Chelonia mydas | Green Sea Turtle | Testudines | 318 | XP_007064235.1 | 85.8% | 485 | 85.8% | 90.3% | 10.2 |
| Reptiles | Crocodylus porosus | Saltwater Crocodile | Crocodilia | 318 | XP_019407441.1 | 84.2% | 486 | 84.2% | 89.3% | 11.3 |
| Aves | Dromaius novaehollandiae | Emu | Casuariiformes | 318 | XP_025976214.1 | 83.7% | 484 | 83.7% | 89.5% | 11.1 |
| Aves | Falco cherrug | Saker Falcon | Falconiformes | 318 | XP_014139614.1 | 85.2% | 484 | 85.2% | 89.9% | 10.6 |
| Amphibians | Xenopus laevis | African Clawed Frog | Anura | 352 | XP_018120469.1 | 36.8% | 481 | 32.9% | 44.1% | 81.9 |
| Amphibians | Xenopus tropicalis | Western Clawed Frog | Anura | 352 | XP_004914844.1 | 37.4% | 481 | 33.7% | 46.5% | 76.6 |
| Amphibians | Eleutherodactylus coqui | Common coquí (Frog) | Anura | 352 | KAG9484589.1 | 38.0% | 478 | 35.4% | 48.5% | 72.4 |
| Fish | Paramormyrops kingsleyae | Elephantfish | Osteoglossiformes (bony fish) | 433 | XP_023683992.1 | 58.8% | 483 | 52.0% | 60.9% | 49.6 |
| Fish | Oncorhynchus tshawytscha | Chinook Salmon | Salmoniformes (bony fish) | 433 | XP_024285887.1 | 56.2% | 481 | 50.6% | 61.3% | 48.9 |
| Fish | Danio rerio | Zebrafish | Cypriniformes (Zebrafish) | 433 | XP_009293252.1 | 35.5% | 489 | 32.1% | 43.3% | 83.7 |
| Fish | Carcharodon carcharias | Great White Shark | Lamniformes (sharks and rays) | 465 | XP_041071062.1 | 50.9% | 484 | 45.7% | 56.0% | 58.0 |
| Invertebrates | Trachymyrmex septentrionalis | Ant | Arthropoda | 736 | XP_018345408.1 | 29.9% | 485 | 24.3% | 33.2% | 110.3 |
| Invertebrates | Chionoecetes opilio | Snow Crab | Arthropoda | 736 | KAG0728066.1 | 31.3% | 478 | 21.0% | 32.1% | 113.6 |
| Invertebrates | Amphibalanus amphitrite | Acorn Barnacle | Arthropoda | 736 | XP_043205896.1 | 30.1% | 489 | 23.8% | 34.9% | 105.3 |
| Invertebrates | Owenia fusiformis | Tubeworm | Annelida | 736 | CAC9666901.1 | 33.3% | 480 | 27.8% | 41.0% | 89.2 |
| Invertebrates | Pomacea canaliculata | Channeled Applesnail | Mollusca | 736 | XP_025105792.1 | 31.0% | 489 | 25.4% | 38.2% | 96.2 |
| Invertebrates | Octopus sinensis | Asian Common Octopus | Mollusca | 736 | XP_036357334.1 | 34.2% | 462 | 26.2% | 36.6% | 100.5 |

6 paralogs of GPATCH2L Homo sapiens.
| Paralogs [Homo sapiens] | Accession number | Sequence length (aa) | Sequence identity (%) ! !Sequence similarity (%) | Corrected Divergence [m] | |
|---|---|---|---|---|---|
| GPATCH2L | NP_060396.2 | 482 | 100.0% | 100.0% | 0 |
| GPATCH2 | NP_060510.1 | 528 | 31.3% | 43.6% | 83.0 |
| GPATCH1 | NP_060495 | 931 | 9.8% | 17.2% | 176.0 |
| GPATCH3 | NP_071361 | 525 | 13.3% | 22.8% | 147.8 |
| GPATCH4 | NP_056405 | 375 | 6.8% | 11.2% | 218.9 |
| GPATCH8 | NP_001002909 | 1502 | 8.1% | 12.3% | 209.6 |
| GPATCH11 | NP_777591 | 525 | 9.2% | 18.4% | 169.3 |

=== Evolution ===
GPATCH2L evolves more slowly compared to Fibrinogen Alpha Chain but faster than Cytochrome C. In the unrooted tree of GPATCH2L protein, only one mammal (human) is included since every species in mammals is very closely related to each other, showing various short lines. Arthropoda in invertebrates shows the longest line, meaning that they have diverged the longest.

GPATCH2L Homo sapiens evolutionary graph

An unrooted tree of GPATCH2L protein, including Mammal, Bird, Reptile, Arthropoda, Mollusca, Annelida, Amphibians, and Fish, was created by using LIRMM.

=== Distant homologs ===
The closest organisms that do/do not have GPATCH2L are as follows: In reptiles, GPATCH2L homologs in crocodile, turtle, snake, lizard, gecko were found by using NCBI Blast, while there were no homologs in skink, chameleon, and iguana. In amphibians, GPATCH2L homologs in frog, toad, and salamander were found by using NCBI Blast, while other types of amphibians, such as caecilian, microsauria, and labyrinthodontia, do not contain GPATCH2L gene. In Invertebrates, NCBI Blast demonstrates that scallop, starfish, octopus, spider have GPATCH2L gene, but sponge and jellyfish do not. Lastly, there are no GPATCH2L homolog in fungi and bacteria, according to NCBI Blast.

The analysis of amino acids in GPATCH2L human with distant homologs [ant, honeybee, acorn barnacle, octopus, and snail].

== Function and biochemistry ==
GPATCH2L's function is still unknown; however, the paralog GPATCH3 has been shown to participate in innate immune response within mammals. GPATCH 3 negatively regulates RLR-mediated innate antiviral response, disrupting VISA signalosome assembly. It has also shown to participate in ocular and craniofacial development.

== Clinical significance ==
An SNP (rs935332) within the human GPATCH2L region is related to scleroderma renal crisis (SRC), according to the validation cohort. Immunostaining of renal biopsy sections demonstrated an increase in tubular expression of GPATCH2L, despite the absence of any genetic replication for the associated SNP.

Retinitis Pigmentosa 24 is one of the diseases that is associated with this gene. The expression of GPATCH2L in cancer is as follows: A few cases of pancreatic cancers exhibited strong immunoreactivity, while malignant lymphomas, colorectal, breast, and prostate cancers were negative or weakly stained.

GPATCH2 is overexpressed in the great majority of breast cancer cases since it encodes a nuclear factor that may be important for tumor growth during breast cancer and spermatogenesis. An interaction of hPrp43 (an RNA-dependent ATPase) and GPATCH2 protein greatly improves the ATPase activity of hPrp43 and cause a growth-promoting effect on mammalian cells. Since GPATCH2 may be novel cancer/testis antigen, according to northern blot analyses of normal human organs, targeting GPATCH2 or inhibiting the interaction between hPrp43 and GPATCH2 could be a therapeutic technique for breast cancer.
