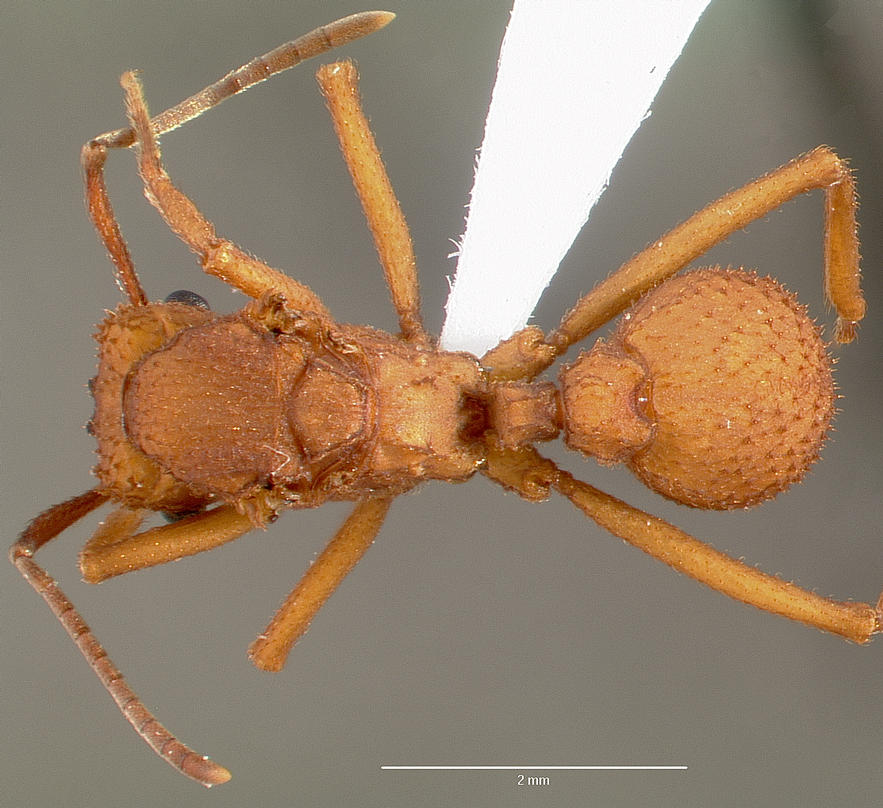

Scientific classification
- Domain: Eukaryota
- Kingdom: Animalia
- Phylum: Arthropoda
- Class: Insecta
- Order: Hymenoptera
- Family: Formicidae
- Subfamily: Myrmicinae
- Genus: Trachymyrmex
- Species: T. nogalensis

Binomial name
- Trachymyrmex nogalensis Byars, 1951

= Trachymyrmex nogalensis =

Species of ant

Trachymyrmex nogalensis is a species of higher myrmicine in the family Formicidae.

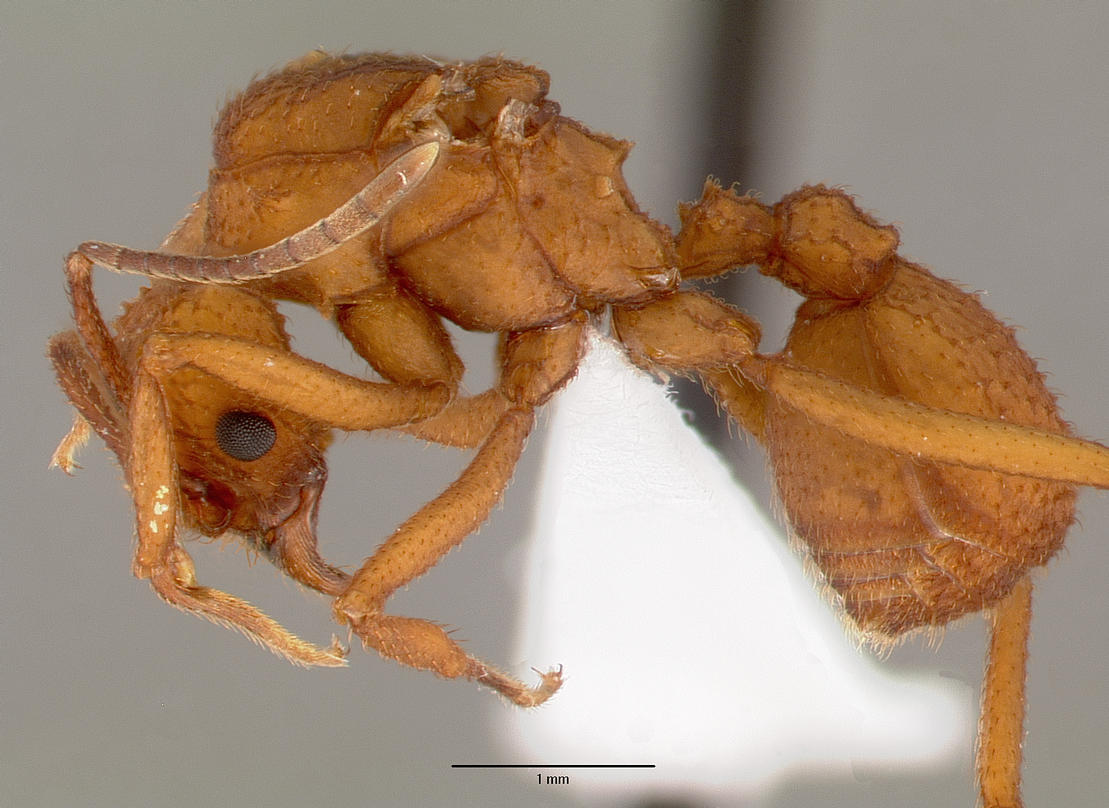
