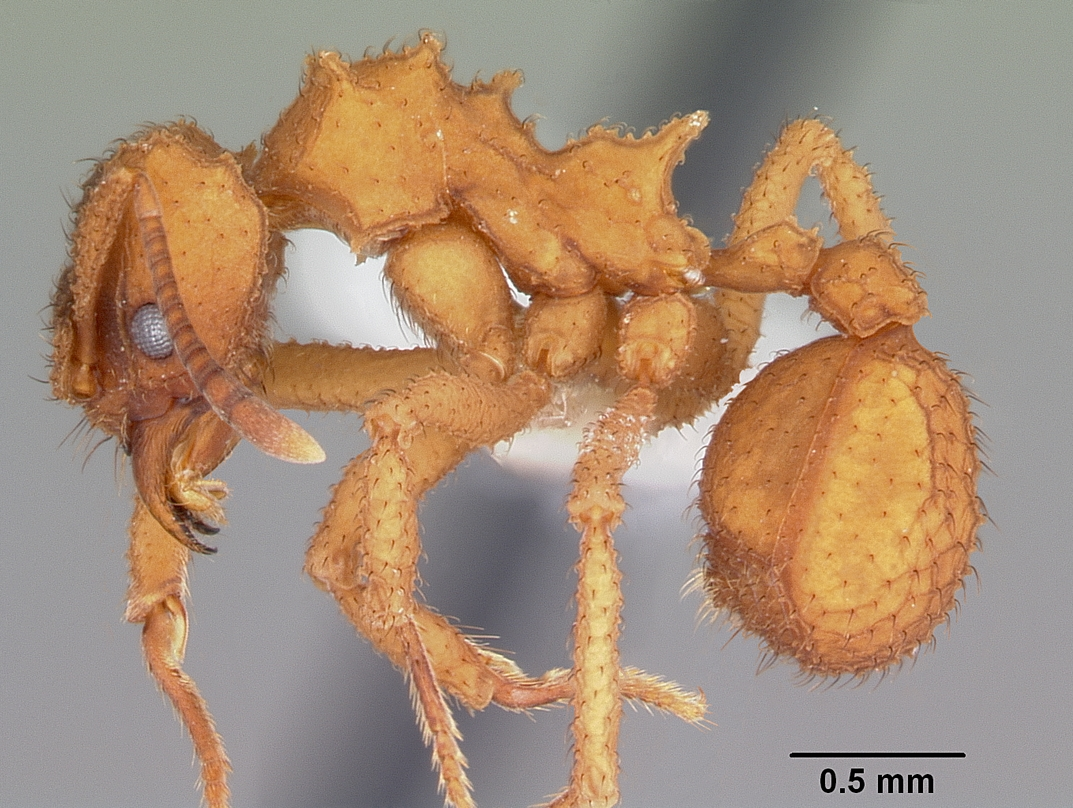
- M. turrifex Collected Bentsen-Rio Grande State Park, Texas

Scientific classification
- Kingdom: Animalia
- Phylum: Arthropoda
- Clade: Pancrustacea
- Class: Insecta
- Order: Hymenoptera
- Family: Formicidae
- Subfamily: Myrmicinae
- Genus: Mycetomoellerius
- Species: M. turrifex

Binomial name
- Mycetomoellerius turrifex (Wheeler, 1903)

Synonyms
- Atta (Trachymyrmex) turrifex; Cyphomyrmex (Trachymyrmex) turrifex; Trachymyrmex turrifex

= Mycetomoellerius turrifex =

Species of ant

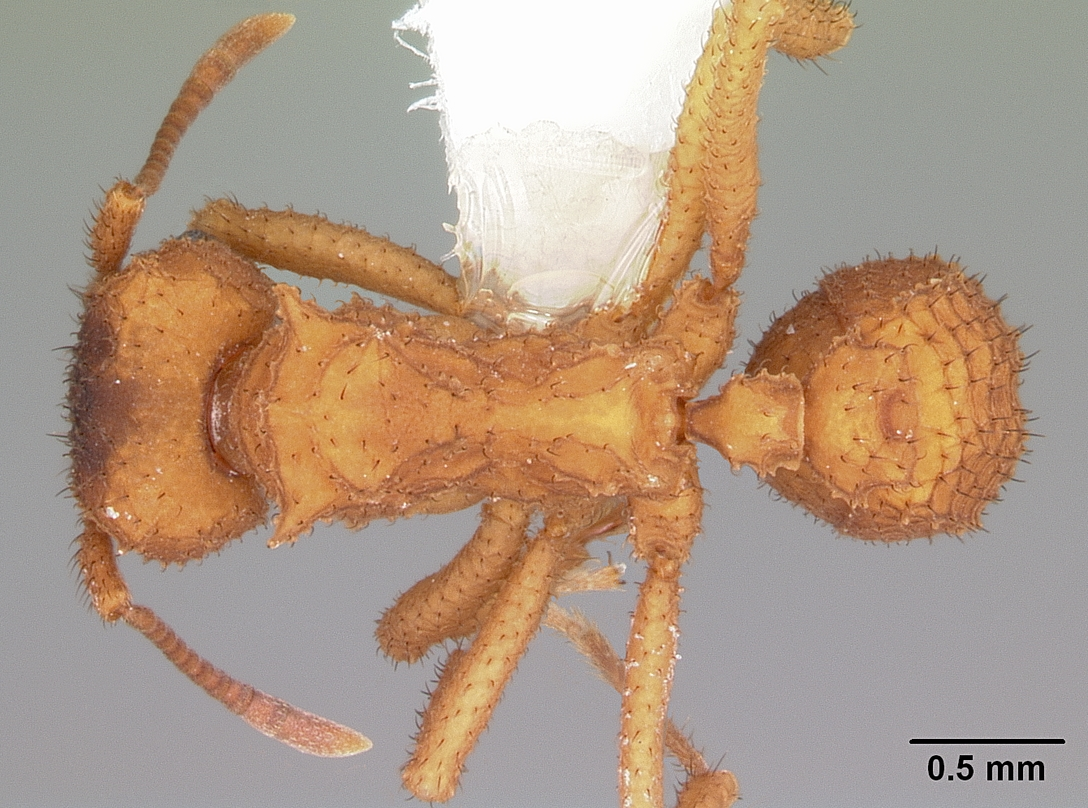
Mycetomoellerius turrifex dorsal view

Mycetomoellerius turrifex is a species of fungus farming ant in the myrmicine genus Mycetomoellerius. The species was formerly placed in the genus Trachymyrmex, but was moved to the newly erected genus Mycetomoellerius by Solomon et al (2019) based on molecular phylogenetic analysis.

== Subspecies ==
Two subspecies had been previously recognized in the species T. turrifex caroli (Wheeler, 1911) and T. t. turrifex (Wheeler, 1903), however Solomon et al (2019) did not recover any subspecies as distinct.
