= I Sing the Body Electric (disambiguation) =

"I Sing the Body Electric" is an 1855 poem from Leaves of Grass by Walt Whitman.

I Sing the Body Electric, or similar, may also refer to:

- "I Sing the Body Electric" (The Twilight Zone), a 1962 episode of the TV series, written by Ray Bradbury
- I Sing the Body Electric! (short story collection), by Ray Bradbury, 1969, including the short story of the same name
- I Sing the Body Electric (album), by Weather Report, 1972
- "I Sing the Body Electric", a song from the 1980 film Fame

== See also ==
- I Sing the Body Electro, a 1998 album by Kurtis Mantronik
- We Sing the Body Electric, a 2002 album by Sincebyman
- We Sing the Body Electric!, a 2009 album by The Lonely Forest
- Body Electric (disambiguation)
