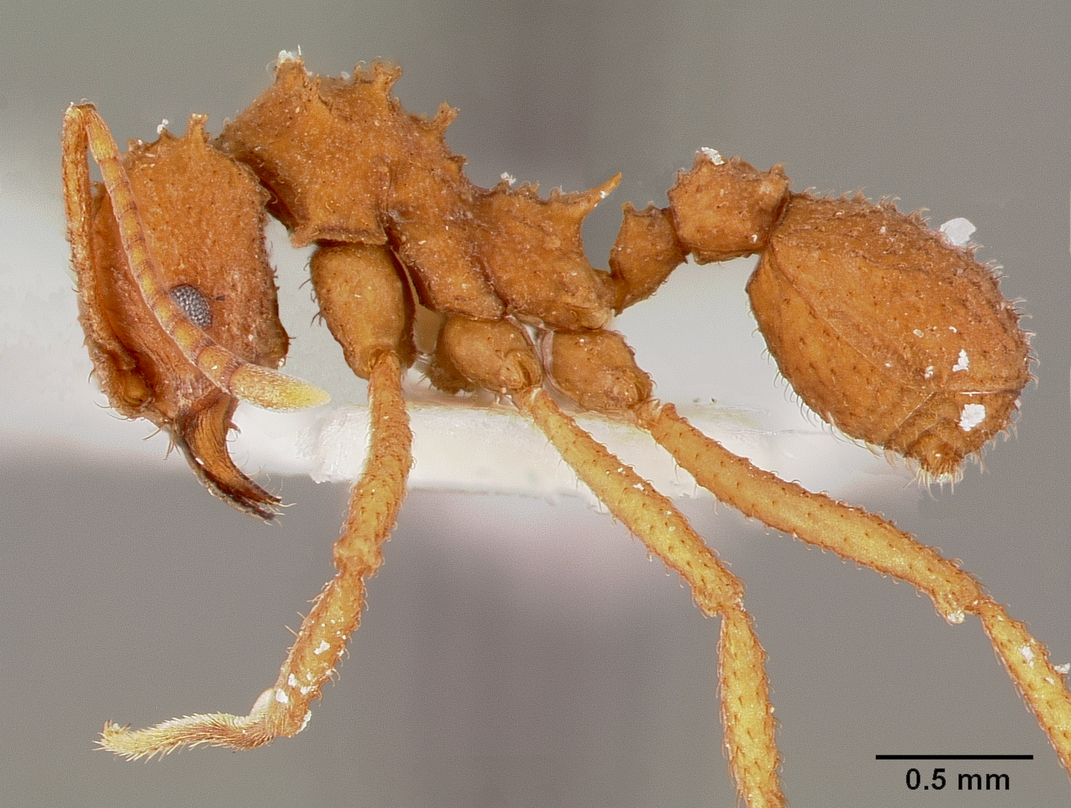
- Trachymyrmex septentrionalis worker

Scientific classification
- Kingdom: Animalia
- Phylum: Arthropoda
- Clade: Pancrustacea
- Class: Insecta
- Order: Hymenoptera
- Family: Formicidae
- Subfamily: Myrmicinae
- Tribe: Attini
- Genus: Trachymyrmex; Forel, 1893

Type species
- Atta septentrionalis McCook, 1881

Diversity
- 48 species

= Trachymyrmex =

Genus of ants

Trachymyrmex is a genus of fungus-growing ants in the subfamily Myrmicinae. The genus is mainly tropical in distribution, with most species being found in Central and South America.

The queens of the species appear to mate with only one male on their nuptial flight.

== Species ==
A number of species were moved from Trachymyrmex based on molecular phylogeny by Solomon et al. 2019. Of the species formerly included, nine were retained in Trachymyrmex, while 31 of the species were moved to the new genus Mycetomoellerius, and an additional nine moved to Paratrachymyrmex.

Trachymyrmex species

- T. arizonensis (Wheeler, 1907)
- T. carinatus Mackay & MacKay, 1997
- T. desertorum (Wheeler, 1911)
- T. nogalensis Byars, 1951
- T. pakawa Sánchez-Peña et al, 2018
- T. pomonae Rabeling et al, 2007
- T. saussurei (Forel, 1885)
- T. septentrionalis (McCook, 1881)
- T. smithi Buren, 1944

Species moved to Mycetomoellerius

- T. agudensis (Kempf, 1967)
- T. atlanticus (Mayhé-Nunes & Brandão, 2007)
- T. cirratus Mayhé-Nunes & Brandão, 2005
- T. compactus Mayhé-Nunes & Brandão, 2002
- T. dichrous Kempf, 1967
- T. echinus Weber, 1938
- T. farinosus (Emery, 1894)
- T. fiebrigi (Santschi, 1916)
- T. gaigei (Forel, 1914)
- T. guianensis Weber, 1937
- T. haytianus (Wheeler & Mann, 1914)
- T. holmgreni Wheeler, 1925
- T. iheringi (Emery, 1888)
- T. isthmicus Santschi, 1931
- T. ixyodus Mayhé-Nunes & Brandão, 2007
- T. jamaicensis (André, 1893)
- T. kempfi Fowler, 1982
- T. oetkeri (Forel, 1908)
- T. opulentus (Mann, 1922) (jr syn *T. wheeleri)
- T. papulatus Santschi, 1922
- †T. primaevus Baroni Urbani, 1980
- T. pruinosus (Emery, 1906)
- T. relictus Borgmeier, 1934
- T. ruthae Weber, 1937
- T. squamulifer (Emery, 1896)
- T. tucumanus (Forel, 1914)
- T. turrifex (Wheeler, 1903)
- T. urichii (Forel, 1893)
- T. verrucosus Borgmeier, 1948
- T. zeteki Weber, 1940

Species moved to Paratrachymyrmex

- T. bugnioni (Forel, 1912)
- T. carib (Weber, 1945)
- T. cornetzi (Forel, 1912)
- T. diversus (Mann, 1916)
- T. intermedius (Forel, 1909) (Type)
- T. irmgardae (Forel, 1912)
- T. levis (Weber, 1938)
- T. mandibularis (Weber, 1938)
- T. phaleratus (Wheeler, 1925)
