= Rolf Pfeifer =

Swiss AI researcher (born 1947)

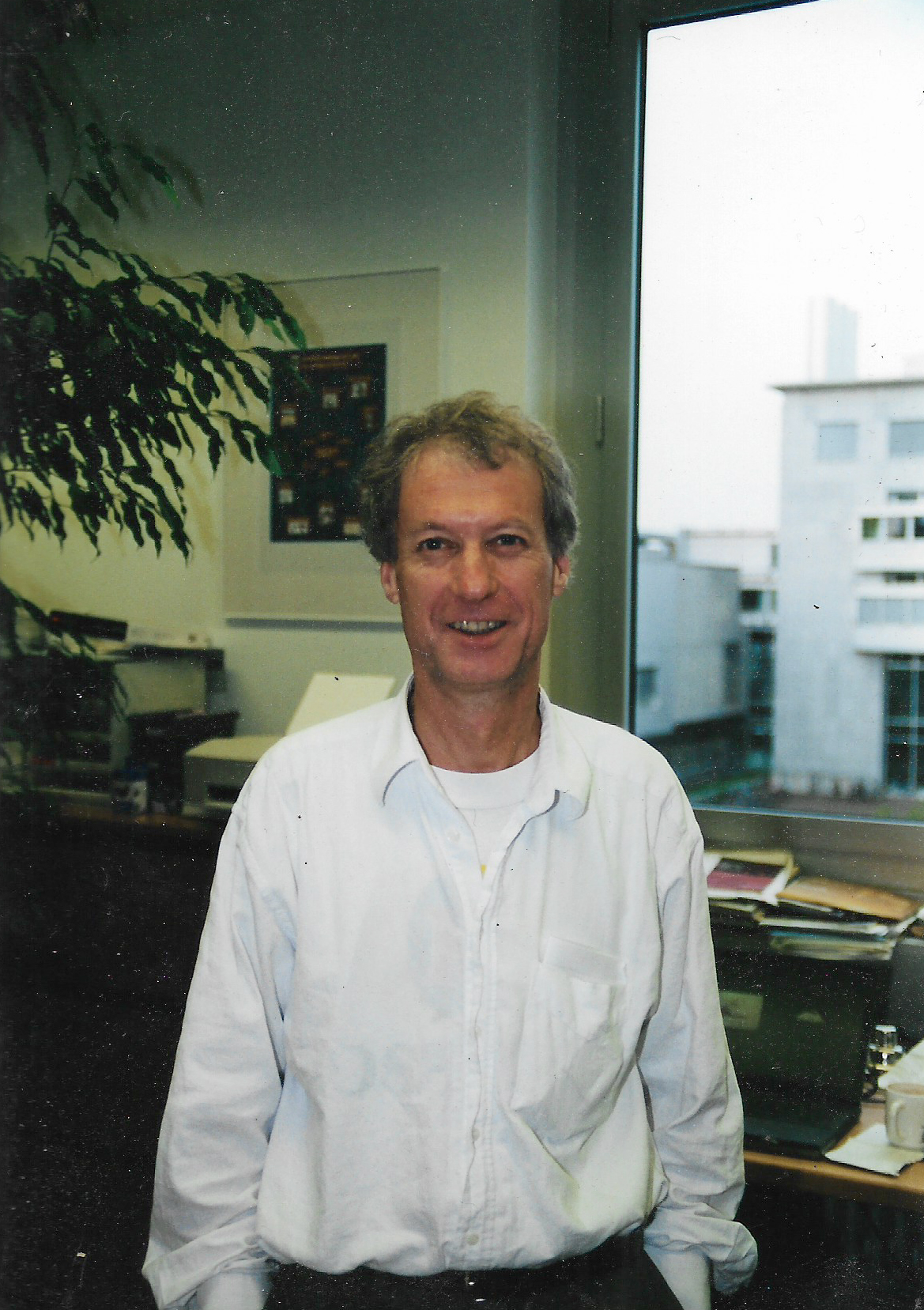
- Pfeifer in 2020
- Born: 24 February 1947 (age 79); Zürich, Switzerland
- Citizenship: Swiss
- Education: ETH Zurich
- Known for: Embodyment
- Scientific career
- Fields: Cognitive science, artificial intelligence, robotics
- Workplaces: University of Zurich; Osaka University; Shanghai Jiao Tong University
- Academic advisors: Carl August Zehnder
- Doctoral students: Josh Bongard

Rolf Pfeifer (born 24 February 1947) is a Swiss artificial-intelligence researcher. He was a professor of computer science at the Department of Informatics at the University of Zurich, and director of the Artificial Intelligence Laboratory, where he retired in 2014. Currently he is a specially appointed professor at Osaka University, and a visiting professor at Shanghai Jiao Tong University.

He has a master's degree in physics and mathematics and a Ph.D. in computer science from the Swiss Federal Institute of Technology (ETH) in Zürich, Switzerland. He spent three years as a post-doctoral fellow at Carnegie Mellon University and Yale University in the U.S.

Having worked as a visiting professor and research fellow at the Free University of Brussels, the MIT Artificial Intelligence Laboratory, the Neurosciences Institute (NSI) in San Diego, and the Sony Computer Science Laboratory in Paris, he was elected "21st Century COE Professor, Information Science and Technology" at the University of Tokyo for 2003/2004, from where he held the first global, fully interactive, videoconferencing-based lecture series "The AI Lectures from Tokyo" (including Tokyo, Beijing, Jeddah, Warsaw, Munich, and Zürich). These lectures were renamed the ShanghAI Lectures and since 2009 they have been broadcast all over the world.

He is the author of the books Understanding Intelligence (co-author: C. Scheier), How the Body Shapes the Way We Think: A New View of Intelligence MIT Press, 2006 (with Josh Bongard), and "Designing Intelligence" (with Josh Bongard and Don Berry). He has published over 100 scientific articles.

His research interests include Embodied cognition, Biorobotics, Autonomous agents/mobile robots, Artificial life, Morphology/morpho-functional machines, Situated Design, Emotion.

== Books ==
- Understanding Intelligence, Bradford Books, 2001; with Christian Scheier
- How the Body Shapes the Way We Think: A New View of Intelligence, Bradford Books, 2006; with Josh Bongard
- Designing Intelligence Paperback, GRIN, 2013, with Josh Bongard, Don Berry
