= Josh Bongard =

Canadian academic

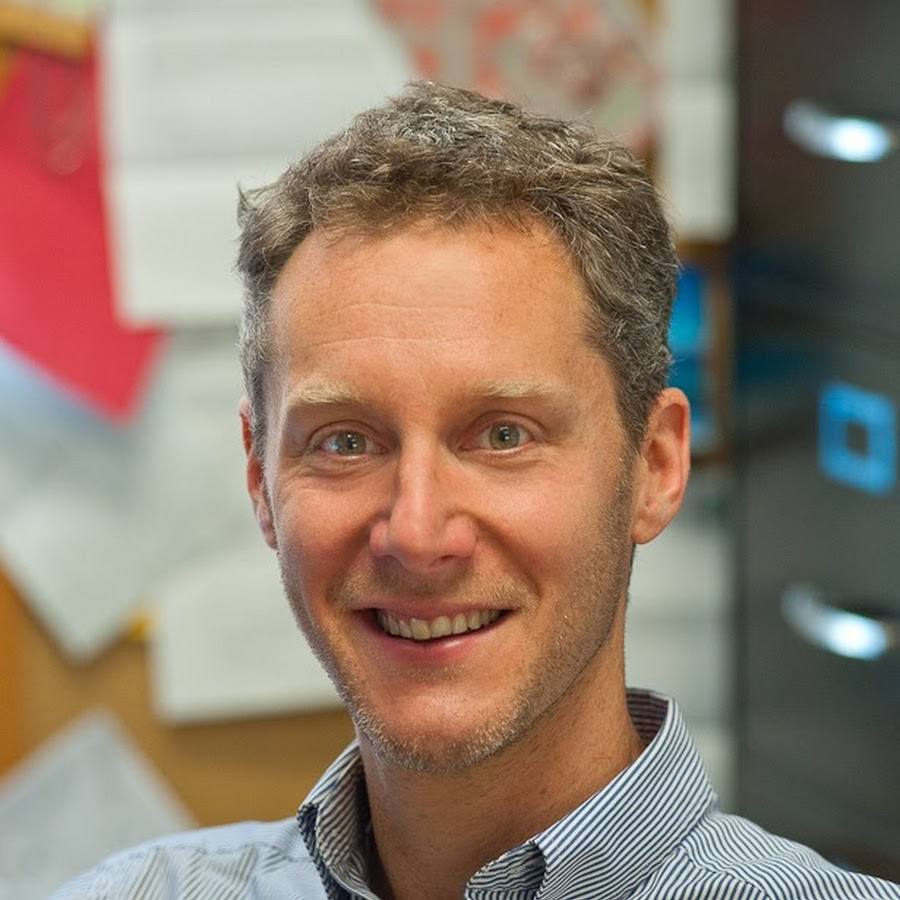
- Born: April 17, 1974 (age 52)
- Citizenship: Canada
- Education: McMaster University; University of Sussex; University of Zurich
- Known for: Self-modeling robots, Xenobots
- Scientific career
- Fields: Robotics, Artificial Intelligence
- Workplaces: Cornell University; University of Vermont
- Doctoral advisor: Rolf Pfeifer

Josh Bongard is a professor at the University of Vermont and a 2010 PECASE awardee.

He attended Northern Secondary School in Toronto, and received his bachelor's degree in Computer Science from McMaster University ('97), Canada, his master's degree from the University of Sussex, UK, and his PhD from the University of Zurich (1999–2003), Switzerland. He served as a postdoctoral associate under Hod Lipson in the Computational Synthesis Laboratory at Cornell University in the United States from 2003 to 2006.

He is the co-author of the popular science book entitled "How the Body Shapes the Way We Think: A New View of Intelligence", MIT Press, November 2006. (With Rolf Pfeifer) ISBN 0-262-16239-3. He is also the co-author of "Designing Intelligence: Why Brains Aren't Enough" (with Rolf Pfeifer and Don Berry) ISBN 978-3-640-81221-9.

In 2007, he was named to the MIT Technology Review TR35 as one of the top 35 innovators in the world under the age of 35.

== Selected publications ==
Kriegman, S., Blackiston, D., Levin, M., and Bongard, J. (2020) A scalable pipeline for designing reconfigurable organisms. Proceedings of the National Academy of Sciences, doi:10.1073/pnas.1910837117.

Bongard J. (2011) Morphological change in machines accelerates the evolution of robust behavior. Proceedings of the National Academy of Sciences, doi:10.1073/pnas.1015390108.

Bongard J. and Lipson H. (2007) Automated reverse engineering of nonlinear dynamical systems. Proceedings of the National Academy of Sciences, 104(24): 9943-9948.

Bongard, J., Zykov, V., Lipson, H. (2006) Resilient machines through continuous self-modeling. Science, 314: 1118-1121.
