= Body Electric =

Body Electric may refer to:

== Literature ==
- The Body Electric, a 1985 book on bioelectromagnetism co-authored by Robert O. Becker
- The Body Electric, a 1979 book on Kirlian photography by Thelma Moss
- The Body Electric, a 2002 book on cybernetics by James Geary

== Music ==
- Body Electric (album), by Steve Roach and Vir Unis, 1999
- "Body Electric", a song by Lana Del Rey from her 2012 EP Paradise
- "Body Electric", a 1982 song by The Sisters of Mercy
- "The Body Electric" (Rush song), from the 1984 album Grace Under Pressure
- "The Body Electric", a song by Hurray for the Riff Raff from the 2014 album Small Town Heroes

== Film and television ==
- The Body Electric, 1985 Canadian animated TV Movie directed by David Feiss
- Body Electric (film), 2017 Brazilian film directed and written by Marcelo Caetano
- "The Body Electric" (Cardiac Arrest), a 1996 television episode

== See also ==
- "I Sing the Body Electric" (poem), an 1855 poem from Leaves of Grass by Walt Whitman
- I Sing the Body Electric (disambiguation)
