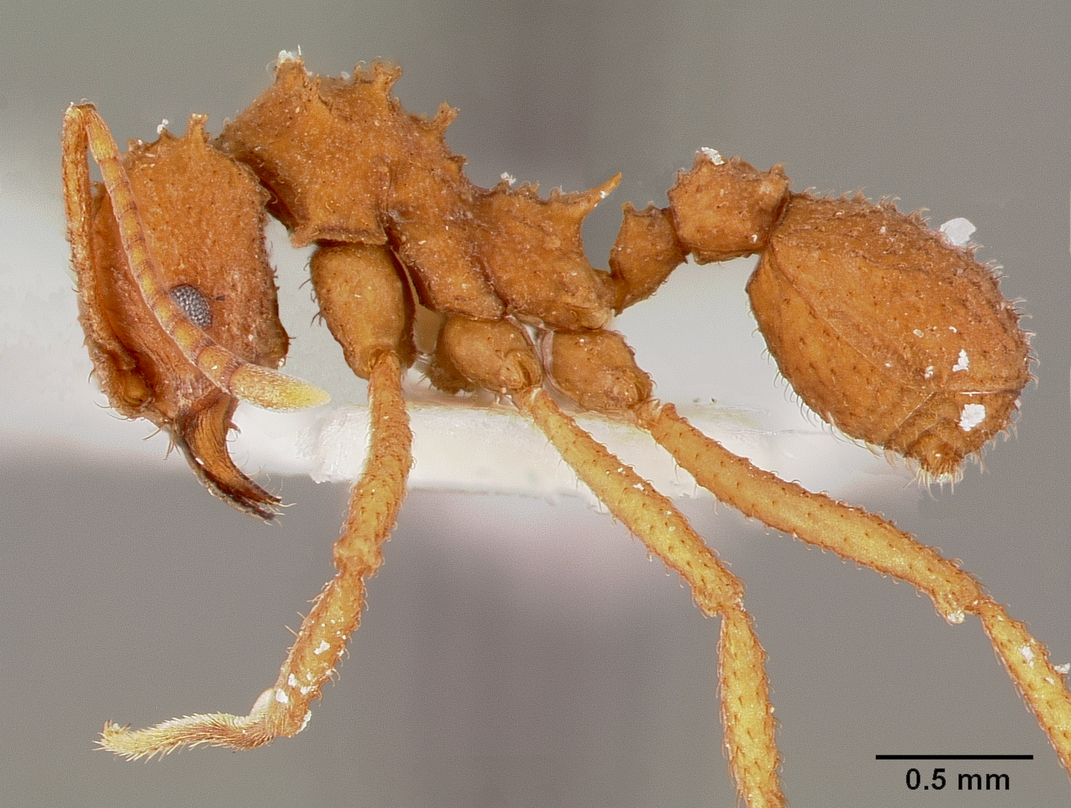
- Trachymyrmex septentrionalis worker

Scientific classification
- Kingdom: Animalia
- Phylum: Arthropoda
- Clade: Pancrustacea
- Class: Insecta
- Order: Hymenoptera
- Family: Formicidae
- Subfamily: Myrmicinae
- Genus: Trachymyrmex
- Species: T. septentrionalis

Binomial name
- Trachymyrmex septentrionalis (McCook, 1881)

= Trachymyrmex septentrionalis =

Species of ant

Young Trachymyrmex septentrionalis queen with her first worker in a test tube setup.

Trachymyrmex septentrionalis is a species of ant in the subfamily Myrmicinae. It is the northernmost species in the tribe Attini.

== Distribution ==
The species is common in eastern United States, where it inhabits sandy soils. It is the most widely distributed fungus-growing ant in the United States, known from Texas to Florida, north to Illinois, Ohio and New York. The species has been identified in Durango, Mexico, but these records are likely that of the very similar Trachymyrmex carinatus.
