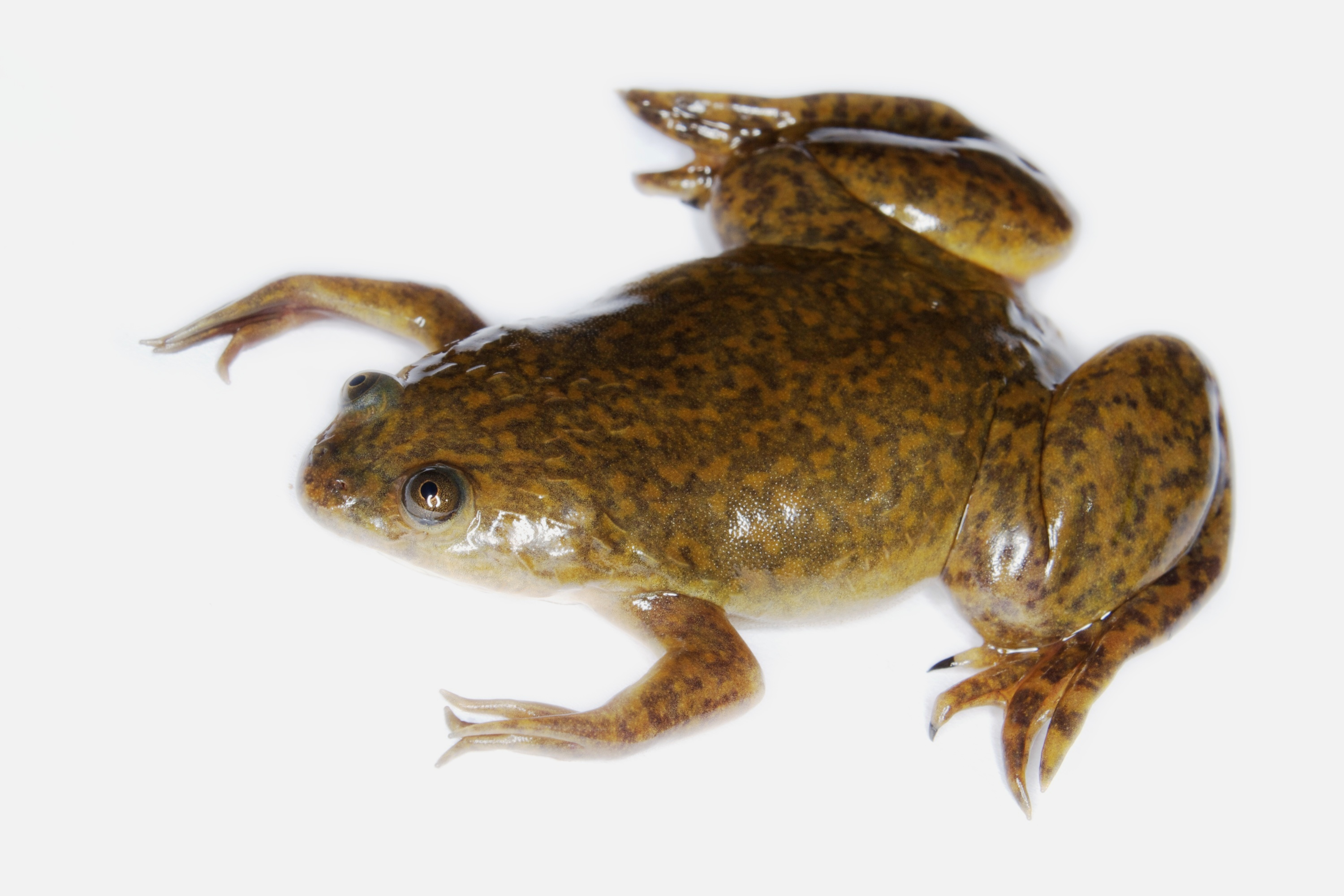

Conservation status
- Least Concern (IUCN 3.1)

Scientific classification
- Kingdom: Animalia
- Phylum: Chordata
- Class: Amphibia
- Order: Anura
- Family: Pipidae
- Genus: Xenopus
- Species: X. laevis

Binomial name
- Xenopus laevis Daudin 1802

Synonyms
- X. boiei Wagler 1827

= African clawed frog =

Species of amphibian

The African clawed frog (Xenopus laevis), also known as simply xenopus, African clawed toad, African claw-toed frog or the platanna) is a species of African aquatic frog of the family Pipidae. Its name is derived from the short black claws on its feet. The word Xenopus means 'strange foot' and laevis means 'smooth'.

The species is found throughout much of Sub-Saharan Africa (Nigeria and Sudan to South Africa), and in isolated, introduced populations in North America, South America, Europe, and Asia. All species of the family Pipidae are tongueless, toothless and completely aquatic. They use their hands to shove food in their mouths and down their throats and a hyobranchial pump to draw or suck things in their mouth. Pipidae have powerful legs for swimming and lunging after food. They also use the claws on their feet to tear pieces of large food. They have no external eardrums, but instead subcutaneous cartilaginous disks that serve the same function. They use their sensitive fingers and sense of smell to find food. Pipidae are scavengers and will eat almost anything living, dying, or dead and any type of organic waste.

It is considered an invasive species in several countries, including across Europe and North America.

== Description ==
A Xenopus laevis froglet after metamorphosis.

These frogs are plentiful in ponds and rivers within the south-eastern portion of Sub-Saharan Africa. They are aquatic and are often a mottled greenish-grey-brown in color, sometimes with yellowish botches, and with a pale white-cream belly. African clawed frogs have been frequently sold as pets, and are sometimes misidentified as African dwarf frogs. Albino clawed frogs are common and sold as animals for laboratories.

Amphibians reproduce by fertilizing eggs outside of the female's body (see frog reproduction). Of the seven amplexus modes (positions in which frogs mate), these frogs are found breeding in inguinal amplexus, where the male clasps the female in front of the female's back legs until eggs are laid, and the male fertilizes the egg mass with the release of sperm.

African clawed frogs are highly adaptable and will lay their eggs whenever conditions allow it. During wet rainy seasons they will travel to other ponds or puddles of water to search for food and new ponds. During times of drought, the clawed frogs can burrow themselves into the mud, becoming dormant for up to a year.

Xenopus laevis have been known to survive 15 or more years in the wild and 25–30 years in captivity. They shed their skin every season, and eat their own shed skin.

Although lacking a vocal sac, the males make a mating call of alternating long and short trills, by contracting the intrinsic laryngeal muscles. Females also answer vocally, signaling either acceptance (a rapping sound) or rejection (slow ticking) of the male. This frog has smooth, slippery skin which is multicolored on its back with blotches of olive gray or brown. The underside is creamy white with a yellow tinge.

Male and female frogs can be easily distinguished through the following differences. Male frogs are small and slim, while females are larger and more rotund. Males have black patches on their hands and arms which aid in grabbing onto females during amplexus. Females have a more pronounced cloaca and have hip-like bulges above their rear legs where their eggs are internally located.

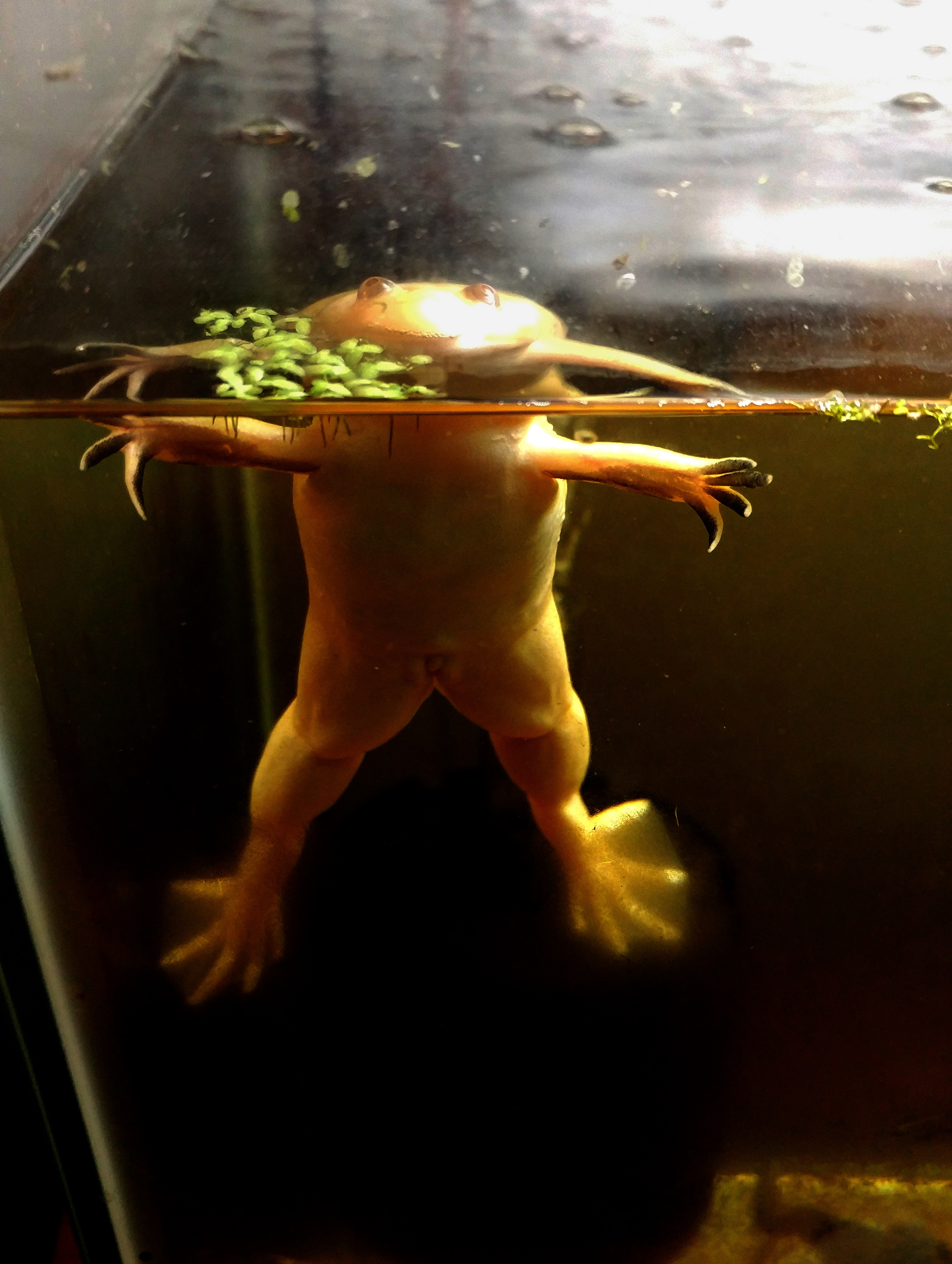
Captive male albino clawed frog in typical floating position with only the eyes and nose sticking out. Note the black hands and forearms used to hold onto the female during amplexus.

Both males and females have a cloaca, which is a chamber through which digestive and urinary wastes pass and through which the reproductive systems also empty. The cloaca empties by way of the vent which in reptiles and amphibians is a single opening for all three systems.

== Behaviour ==
African clawed frogs are fully aquatic and will rarely leave the water except to migrate to new water bodies during droughts or other disturbances. Clawed frogs have powerful legs that help them move quickly both underwater and on land. Feral clawed frogs in South Wales have been found to travel up to 2 kilometres (1.2 mi) between locations. The feet of Xenopus species have three black claws on the last three digits. These claws are used to rip apart food and scratch predators.

Clawed frogs are carnivores and will eat both living and dead prey, including fish, tadpoles, crustaceans, annelids, arthropods, and more. Clawed frogs will try to consume anything that is able to fit into their mouths. Being aquatic, clawed frogs use their sense of smell and their lateral line to detect prey rather than eyesight like other frogs. However, clawed frogs can still see using their eyes and will stalk prey or watch predators by sticking their heads out of the water. Clawed frogs will dig through substrate to unearth worms and other food. Unlike other frogs, they have no tongue to extend to catch food, so clawed frogs use their hands to grab food and shovel it into their mouths.

These frogs are particularly cannibalistic; the stomach contents of feral clawed frogs in California have revealed large amounts of the frog's larvae. Clawed frog larvae are filter feeders and collect nutrients from plankton, allowing adult frogs that consume the tadpoles to have access to these nutrients. This allows clawed frogs to survive in areas that have little to no other food sources.

Clawed frogs are nocturnal, and most reproductive activity and feeding occurs after dark. Male clawed frogs will grab onto other males and even other species of frogs. Male frogs that are grasped will make release calls and attempt to break free.

If not feeding, clawed frogs will just sit motionless on top of the substrate or floating, legs splayed below, at the water's surface with their nostrils and eyes sticking out.

== Biology ==
=== Thyroid ===
The clawed frog liver responds to low temperatures by increasing production of type II iodothyronine deiodinase through increased food intake. This in turn spurs the thyroid to increase T_{3} to increase body temperature. (This T_{3} increase also induces germ cell apoptosis, mediated through genes left over from tadpole metamorphosis.)

The effects of provocation of T hormone release are broadly differentiated by where it starts: If centrally, within the mediobasal hypothalamus, then it stimulates seasonal testicular growth; if peripherally, then testicular regression and cold-season thermogenesis.

These observations are regarded as widely applicable across vertebrate thyroid systems.

=== Lipidomics ===
The lipidomics of Xenopus oocytes have been studied by Tian et al 2014 and Phan et al 2015.

=== Epigenetic aging ===
In X. laevis, epigenetic methylation changes in neural-developmental genes associated with aging are analogous to aging related epigenetic changes in mammalian species. This finding suggests that, during their evolutionary divergence, patterns of epigenetic changes in neural-development genes during aging have been conserved between frogs and mammals C.

=== Karyotype and genomics ===
X. laevis is allotetraploid, with 4x = 2n = 36. Although it functions as practically diploid in normal reproduction, its genome contains the remnants of the entire genomes of two extinct, diploid frog species, today referred to as the "long" and "short" subgenomes: the "short" subgenome has undergone more compaction in the past, making its chromosomes shorter than the homologous ones in the "long" subgenome. In today's nomenclature, X. laevis chromosomes are referred to as e.g. XLA1L and XLA2S, i.e. chromosome 1 from the "long" subgenome and 2 from the "short" subgenome; genes are similarly named with a suffix like PAX6.S. The numbering of chromosomes is based on homology to the diploid X. tropicalis: 1–8 map to the identically-numbered X. tropicalis chromosome, while 9 maps to X. tropicalis chromosomes 9 and 10. The sex chromosome is XTR2L, which exists in Z and W versions.

Xenopus clivii are also allotetraploid and descended from the same allotetraploidization event; hence they share the same chromosome nomenclature. More generally all extant allotetraploid members of Xenopus subgenus Xenopus – that is to say the entire extant subgenus, because the diploid species are extinct – descend from the same event.

== In the wild ==
In the wild, X. laevis are native to wetlands, ponds, and lakes across arid/semiarid regions of Sub-Saharan Africa. X. laevis and X. muelleri occur along the western boundary of the Great African Rift. The people of the sub-Saharan are generally very familiar with this frog, and some cultures use it as a source of protein, an aphrodisiac, or as fertility medicine. Two historic outbreaks of priapism have been linked to consumption of frog legs from frogs that ate insects containing cantharidin.

African clawed frogs in the wild are found at higher densities in artificial water bodies, such as ponds, dams and irrigation canals, rather than in natural lagoons or streams or rivers. There is no evidence of predation on native anurans, but rather on their own larvae. They face predation from native birds.

Cause of concerns from African clawed frogs include reaching both lower and higher altitudes than formerly estimated, and being able to migrate overland to colonise other water bodies, causing ecological disruption and spreading diseases.

X. laevis in the wild are commonly infected by various parasites, including monogeneans in the urinary bladder.

== Use in research ==
A research or model organism is a living organism that scientists use to study biology.

Xenopus embryos and eggs are a popular model system for a wide variety of biological studies, in part because they have the potential to lay eggs throughout the year. This animal is widely used because of its powerful combination of experimental tractability and close evolutionary relationship with humans, at least compared to many model organisms. For a more comprehensive discussion of the use of these frogs in biomedical research, see Xenopus.

Xenopus laevis is also notable for its use in the first widely used method of pregnancy testing. In the 1930s, two South African researchers, Hillel Shapiro and Harry Zwarenstein, students of Lancelot Hogben at the University of Cape Town, discovered that the urine from pregnant women would induce oocyte production in X. laevis within 8–12 hours of injection. This was used as a simple and reliable test up through to the 1960s. In the late 1940s, Carlos Galli Mainini found in separate studies that male specimens of Xenopus and Bufo could be used to indicate pregnancy Today, commercially available hCG is injected into Xenopus males and females to induce mating behavior and to breed these frogs in captivity at any time of the year.

Xenopus has long been an important tool for in vivo studies in molecular, cell, and developmental biology of vertebrate animals. However, the wide breadth of Xenopus research stems from the additional fact that cell-free extracts made from Xenopus are a premier in vitro system for studies of fundamental aspects of cell and molecular biology. Thus, Xenopus is the only vertebrate model system that allows for high-throughput in vivo analyses of gene function and high-throughput biochemistry.

Xenopus oocytes are a leading system in their own right for studies of various systems, including ion transport and channel physiology. Xanthos et al 2001 uses oocytes to uncover T-box expression earlier than previously found in vertebrates.

Although X. laevis does not have the super short generation time, or genetic simplicity generally desired in genetic model organisms, it is an important model organism in developmental biology, cell biology, toxicology and neurobiology. X. laevis takes 1 to 2 years to reach sexual maturity. It does have a large and easily manipulated embryo, however. The ease of manipulation in amphibian embryos has given them an important place in historical and modern developmental biology. A related species, Xenopus tropicalis, is considered a more viable model for genetics, although gene editing protocols have now been perfected for.

Roger Wolcott Sperry used X. laevis for his famous experiments describing the development of the visual system. These experiments led to the formulation of the chemoaffinity hypothesis.

X. laevis have been used as a model organism in vertebrae cardiogenesis, human congenital heart defects, and in GWAS studies of congenital heart defects.

Xenopus laevis also serves as an ideal model system for the study of the mechanisms of apoptosis. In fact, iodine and thyroxine stimulate the spectacular apoptosis of the cells of the larval gills, tail and fins in amphibians metamorphosis, and stimulate the evolution of their nervous system transforming the aquatic, vegetarian tadpole into the terrestrial, carnivorous frog.

Stem cells of this frog were used to create xenobots.

=== Reproductive research ===
Xenopus oocytes provide an important expression system for molecular biology. By injecting DNA or mRNA into the oocyte or developing embryo, scientists can study the protein products in a controlled system. This allows rapid functional expression of manipulated DNAs (or mRNA). This is particularly useful in electrophysiology, where the ease of recording from the oocyte makes expression of membrane channels attractive. One challenge of oocyte work is eliminating native proteins that might confound results, such as membrane channels native to the oocyte. Translation of proteins can be blocked or splicing of pre-mRNA can be modified by injection of Morpholino antisense oligos into the oocyte (for distribution throughout the embryo) or early embryo (for distribution only into daughter cells of the injected cell).

Extracts from the eggs of X. laevis frogs are also commonly used for biochemical studies of DNA replication and repair, as these extracts fully support DNA replication and other related processes in a cell-free environment which allows easier manipulation.

The first vertebrate ever to be cloned was an African clawed frog in 1962, an experiment for which Sir John Gurdon was awarded the Nobel Prize in Physiology or Medicine in 2012 "for the discovery that mature cells can be reprogrammed to become pluripotent".

Additionally, four female African clawed frogs and stored sperm were present on the Space Shuttle Endeavour when it was launched into space on mission STS-47 on 12 September 1992, so that scientists could test whether reproduction and development could occur normally in zero gravity.

=== Genome sequencing ===
Early work on sequencing of the X. laevis genome was started when the Wallingford and Marcotte labs obtained funding from the Texas Institute for Drug and Diagnostic Development (TI3D), in conjunction with projects funded by the National Institutes of Health. The work rapidly expanded to include de novo reconstruction of X. laevis transcripts, in collaboration with groups around the world donating Illumina Hi-Seq RNA sequencing datasets. Genome sequencing by the Rokhsar and Harland groups (UC Berkeley) and by Taira and collaborators (University of Tokyo, Japan) gave a major boost to the project, which, with additional contributions from investigators in the Netherlands, Korea, Canada and Australia, led to publication of the genome sequence and its characterization in 2016.

=== As transexpression tool ===
X. laevis oocytes are often used as an easy model for the artificially induced expression of transgenes. For example, they are commonly used when studying chloroquine resistance produced by specialized transporter mutants. Even so the foreign expression tissue may itself confer some alterations to the expression, and so findings may or may not be entirely identical to native expression: For example, iron has been found by Bakouh et al 2017 to be an important substrate for one such transporter in X. l. oocytes, but as of 2020 iron is merely presumptively involved in native expression of the same gene.

== Online Model Organism Database ==
Xenbase is the Model Organism Database (MOD) for both Xenopus laevis and Xenopus tropicalis. Xenbase hosts the full details and release information regarding the current v10 Xenopus laevis genome released in 2022.

== As pets ==
The clawed frog have been kept as pets and research subjects since as early as the 1950s. They are extremely hardy and long lived, having been known to live up to 20 or even 30 years in captivity.

== As pests ==
African clawed frogs are voracious predators and easily adapt to many habitats. For this reason, they can easily become a harmful invasive species. They can travel short distances to other bodies of water, and some have even been documented to survive mild freezes. They have been shown to devastate native populations of frogs and other creatures by eating their young.

In 2003, Xenopus laevis frogs were discovered in a pond at San Francisco's Golden Gate Park. Much debate now exists in the area on how to exterminate these creatures and keep them from spreading. It is unknown if these frogs entered the San Francisco ecosystem through intentional release or escape into the wild. San Francisco officials drained Lily Pond and fenced off the area to prevent the frogs from escaping to other ponds in the hopes they starve to death.

Due to incidents in which these frogs were released and allowed to escape into the wild, African clawed frogs are illegal to own, transport or sell without a permit in the following US states: Arizona, California, Kentucky, Louisiana, New Jersey, North Carolina, Oregon, Vermont, Virginia, Hawaii, Nevada, and Washington state. However, it is legal to own Xenopus laevis in New Brunswick (Canada) and Ohio.

Feral colonies of Xenopus laevis exist in South Wales, United Kingdom. In Yunnan, China, there is a population of albino clawed frogs in Lake Kunming, along with another invasive: the American bullfrog. Because this population is albino, it suggests that the clawed frogs originated in the pet trade or a laboratory.

The African clawed frog may be an important vector and the initial source of Batrachochytrium dendrobatidis, a chytrid fungus that has been implicated in the drastic decline in amphibian populations in many parts of the world. Unlike in many other amphibian species (including the closely related western clawed frog) where this chytrid fungus causes the disease Chytridiomycosis, it does not appear to affect the African clawed frog, making it an effective carrier.

=== Invasive ===
The African clawed frog is considered invasive by the Centre of Invasive biology from Stellenbosh University with this species even going as far as predating on other species. There has even been a concerted effort to remove this species to ensure the survival of other indigenous species.
