= Tai Shue Wan =

Bay in Hong Kong

Coordinates: 22.2350486°N 114.1660172°E

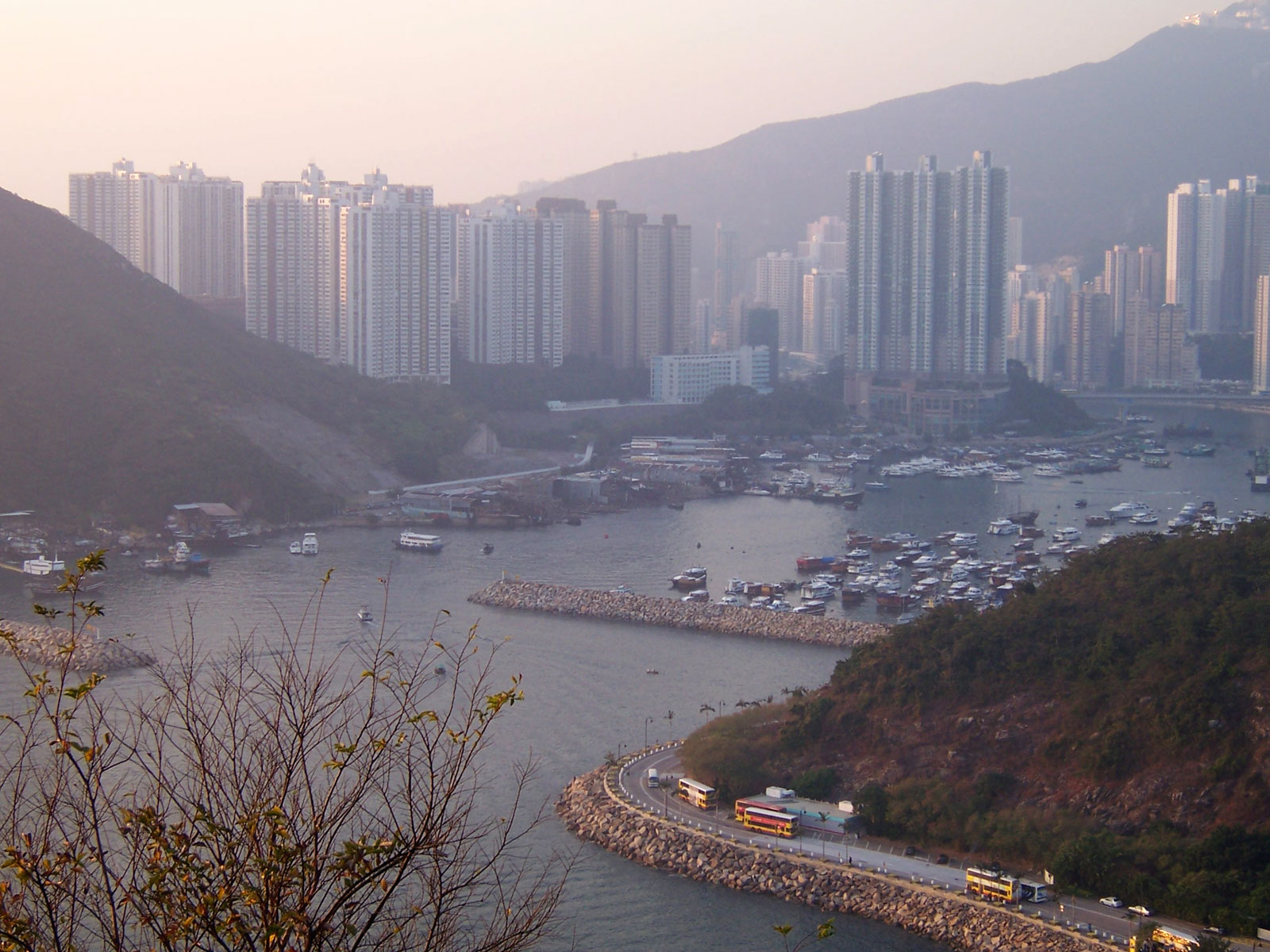
View of Tai Shue Wan

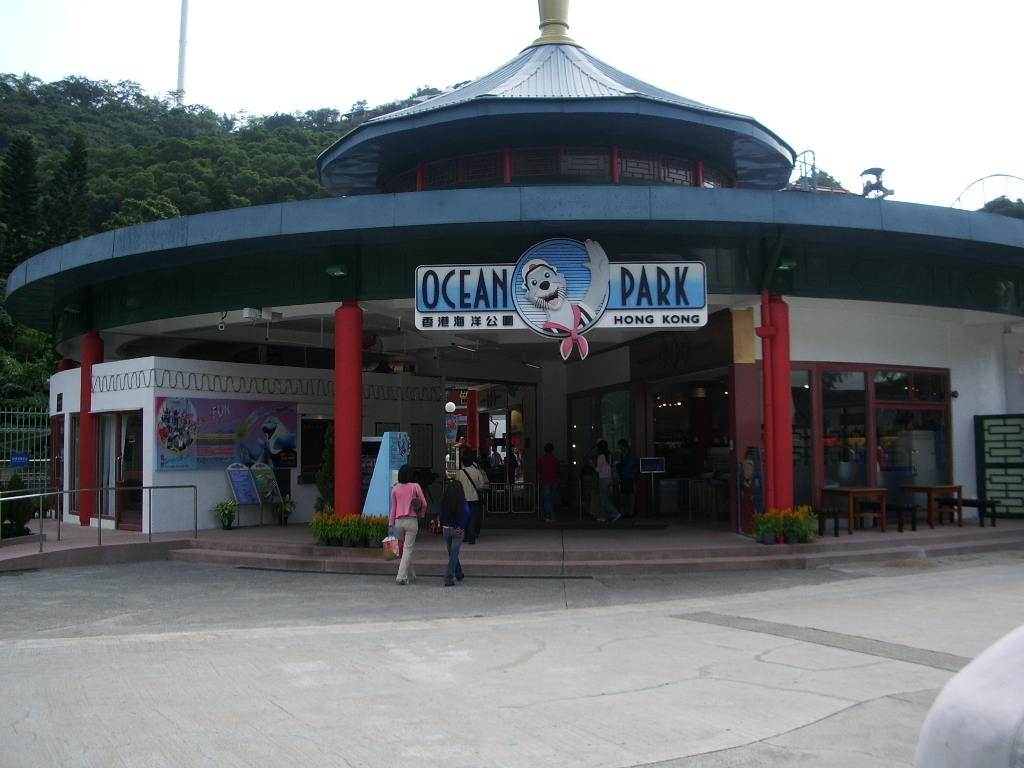
Old entrance of Ocean Park at Tai Shue Wan

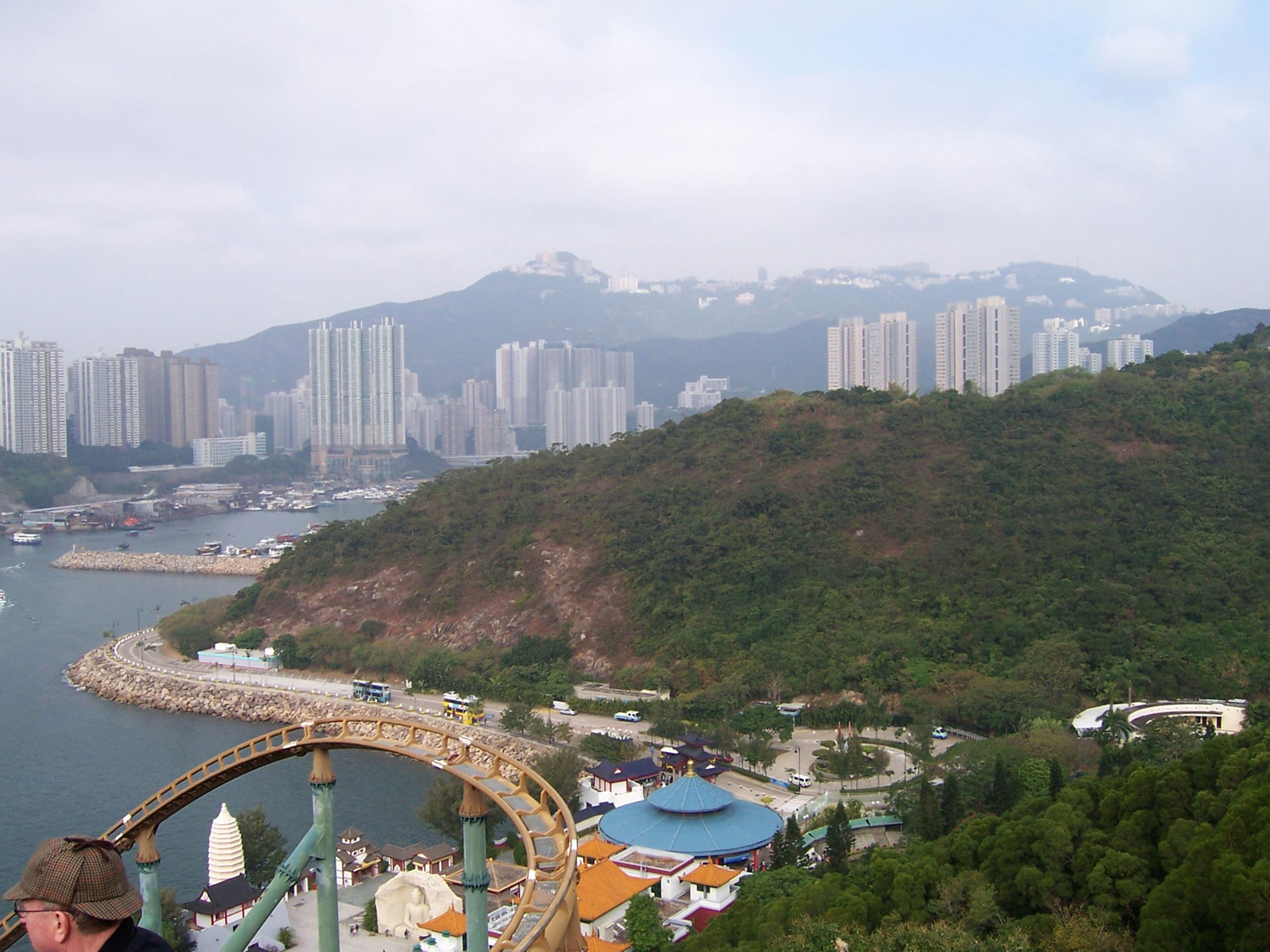
View of Tai Shue Wan from Ocean Park

Tai Shue Wan (Chinese: 大樹灣) is a bay to the south of Nam Long Shan, Wong Chuk Hang, Hong Kong Island, Hong Kong. It comprises the Waterfront section of Ocean Park. The Ocean Park Corporation will develop the Tai Shue Wan area into a new integrated theme zone with the main focus on an all-weather indoor cum outdoor waterpark. A Government loan of $2,290 million was approved by the Finance Committee of the Legislative Council in May 2013 to facilitate the early commencement of the project. The project was scheduled for completion in 2019.

== Others ==
- Ocean Park Hong Kong

== Related ==
- Hair Raiser
- Ocean Park station
- South Island line
- Ocean Park Halloween Bash
