= Ocean Park Hong Kong =

Amusement park in Hong Kong

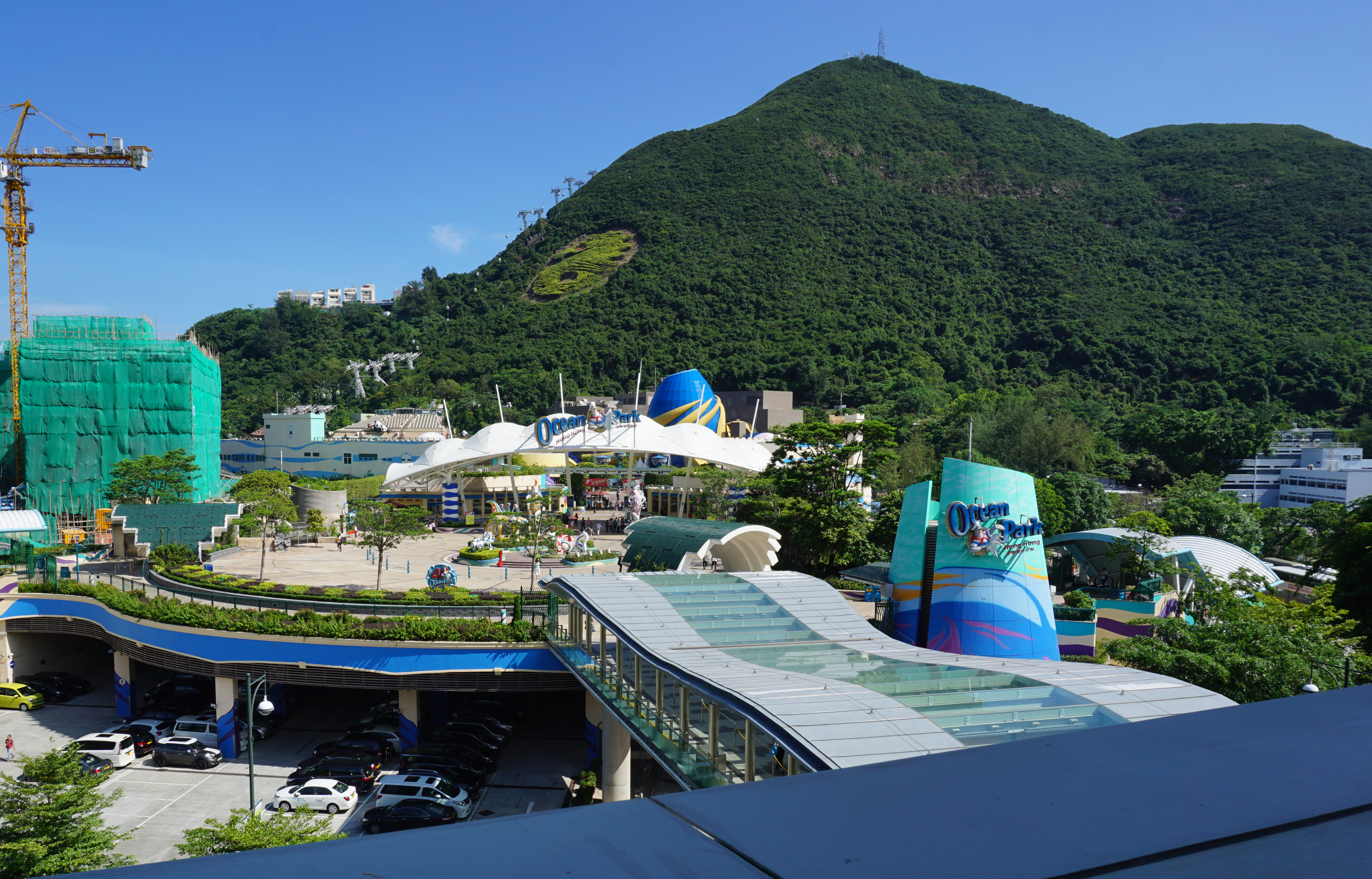
- Main entrance in 2018
- Interactive map of Ocean Park Hong Kong
- Location: Wong Chuk Hang, Hong Kong Island, Hong Kong
- Coordinates: 22°14′45.1″N 114°10′33.3″E
- Status: Operating
- Opened: 10 January 1977; 49 years ago
- Owner: Ocean Park Corporation
- Theme: education, conservation, entertainment
- Slogan: Connect people with nature
- Attendance: 2.4 million (2022–2023)
- Area: 91.5 hectares (226 acres)

Attractions
- Total: 59
- Roller coasters: 2
- Water rides: 1
- Website: www.oceanpark.com.hk/en

Ocean Park Hong Kong
- Traditional Chinese: 香港海洋公園
- Simplified Chinese: 香港海洋公园
- Cantonese Yale: Hēunggóng Hóiyèung Gūngyún
- Literal meaning: Hong Kong Ocean Park
Transcriptions
Standard Mandarin
- Hanyu Pinyin: Xiānggǎng Hǎiyáng Gōngyuán
Hakka
- Romanization: Hiong^{1}gong^{3} Hoi^{3}yong^{2} Gung^{1}yen^{2}(or yen^{3})
Yue: Cantonese
- Yale Romanization: Hēunggóng Hóiyèung Gūngyún
- Jyutping: Hoeng^{1} gong^{2} hoi^{2} joeng^{4} gung^{1} jyun^{2}

Ocean Park Hong Kong, commonly known as Ocean Park, is an amusement and animal theme park in Wong Chuk Hang on Hong Kong Island. Opened on 10 January 1977, it covers 91.5 hectares (226 acres) and combines amusement rides with aquariums and other live-animal exhibits. The park is divided by Brick Hill into two main attraction areas, the Waterfront and the Summit, which are connected by a cable car and the Ocean Express funicular. It is operated by the Ocean Park Corporation, a statutory, financially independent and not-for-profit organisation.

Ocean Park was conceived in 1959 as an oceanarium. The Hong Kong government provided land for the project in 1967, and the Hong Kong Jockey Club subsequently financed its construction. Marine animals formed a central part of the park from its beginnings; its best-known early attraction was the orca Hoi Wai, which lived there from 1979 until her death in 1997. In 1987, Ocean Park ceased to be part of the Jockey Club and became a statutory body. Following Hoi Wai's death and growing controversy over captive-animal performances, the park increasingly developed amusement rides alongside its marine exhibits.

After financial difficulties following the 1997 Asian financial crisis and the 2003 SARS outbreak, Ocean Park began a major redevelopment in the mid-2000s as it prepared for competition from Hong Kong Disneyland. The HK$5.55 billion project reorganised the park into new themed areas and added attractions including the Grand Aquarium, Rainforest and Polar Adventure. By 2014, Ocean Park ranked as the world's 13th-most visited theme park. Attendance subsequently declined, and the park again faced serious financial difficulties before and during the COVID-19 pandemic; its separately ticketed water park Water World opened in 2021, and the park returned to a financial surplus in 2023.

Animal exhibition, education and conservation remain major parts of Ocean Park's activities. Its collections have included giant pandas, dolphins, sea lions, penguins, sharks and rays, while the Ocean Park Conservation Foundation Hong Kong supports wildlife research and conservation and the park works with the Hong Kong government in rescuing and caring for wild animals. Its treatment of marine mammals has also been a longstanding source of controversy. During its early decades the park experienced poor survival rates among captive cetaceans, and from the 1970s to the 1980s it obtained many dolphins and other cetaceans from drive fisheries. Wildlife advocates have continued to criticise the capture of wild marine mammals and their use in performances.

== History and development ==
=== Planning and opening ===
==== Conception ====
Ocean Park was originally conceived as a marine life centre. The idea was first proposed on 3 March 1959 by J. D. Bromhall, chief scientific officer of the Fisheries Research Unit at the University of Hong Kong, who revealed a plan to develop in the city a super aquarium, called an "oceanarium". Bromhall explained the plan by referencing one of the world's two oceanariums at the time – the Marine Studios in Florida, which he described as a type of aquarium where "the species of fish are not separated" and "the conditions are as near as possible [to] those at the bottom of the sea".

In August 1967, the British Hong Kong government offered to provide a free land grant for the project. The site was located at Brick Hill in Aberdeen and occupied 69 hectares (170 acres). The grant cost about HK$4.28 million. In May 1971, it was announced that the oceanarium would come under the Hong Kong Jockey Club, which provided HK$150 million in funding.

==== Cetacean curation ====
During the oceanarium's planning stage in 1970–1971, it hired Kenneth S. Norris as lead consultant. At the time, Norris had previously served as curator for Marineland of the Pacific, and contributed to the conception of SeaWorld and Sea Life Park. He in turn hired Douglas "Ted" Hammond as a veterinarian, who would remain with Ocean Park for the next 15 years and become its curator. In efforts to collect dolphins for the oceanarium, Hammond and his team established satellite bases in the Philippines, Japan, and the Penghu Islands near western Taiwan.

In the Philippines from 1974 to 1975, the team attempted to capture spinners, Fraser's dolphins, and melon-headed whales in Cebu, but were ultimately unsuccessful as these sensitive pelagic species could not adapt to captivity. All of the captured individuals were eventually released back into the wild or died before they could be transported to Hong Kong.

Hammond and his team were more successful in Japan and the Penghu Islands, where they chose to procure dolphins from fishermen who engaged in dolphin drive hunting. (Note: Hammond and his team first attempted this practice with Japanese fishermen, starting in late 1974 with fishermen in Izu Peninsula, extending to Taiji in summer 1975, and Iki Island in February 1981. More dolphins were procured from these fishermen in 1982–1984 and 1987. Meanwhile, the team extended this practice to Penghu Island in March 1975, approaching fishermen of Shagang Village and asking for a few Indo-Pacific bottlenose dolphins. The village's fishermen perceived the dolphins as competition and hunted them for meat and as a form of "pest control".) Species collected as a result included the Indo-Pacific bottlenose dolphin, the Pacific bottlenose dolphin, the false killer whale, the pacific white-sided dolphin, and the short-finned pilot whale. This practice was used by the team from late 1974 to 1987. During this period, more than 90% of all cetaceans housed in Ocean Park were obtained in this way.

Hammond's choice to obtain animals from drive fisheries ended up having a long-lasting impact in the industry. From 1978 to 1993, dolphin brokers and other zoological institutions followed his example and procured dolphins from the same drive fisheries. In some cases, Ocean Park also served as a temporary housing facility for drive-sourced animals being transported elsewhere, including the Knowsley Safari Park, the Ancol Dreamland, and the United States Navy.

==== Opening ====
Following five years of construction, Ocean Park officially opened on 10 January 1977, with Sir Murray MacLehose, Governor of Hong Kong, conducting the opening ceremony. The park's opening was delayed multiple times due to bad weather, landslides, fire, and testing of the cable cars. Also to blame were two disease outbreaks among the park's marine mammals, which killed 38 dolphins, 4 whales, and 5 harbour seals by the time the park opened (see § Marine mammal deaths). The park's admission fees were also criticised by community leaders; resultingly, MacLehose's inauguration speech was downbeat, with him saying that "[i]t is my hope that in the course of time... the headland will gradually be developed to provide room for its enjoyment by larger numbers who may not always wish or be able to pay to see all the exhibits at one time."

=== 20th century ===
==== Marine mammal deaths ====
During the 20th century, Ocean Park drew criticism for the deaths of its marine mammals, particularly its cetaceans. Survival rates were especially poor from the 1970s to mid-1980s, which was later attributed to mismanagement, poor husbandry and veterinary practices, and natural causes.

During its preparatory stage in the 1970s, Ocean Park first experienced two major die-offs caused by outbreaks of infectious diseases. In 1974, the park received 20 Pacific bottlenose dolphins acquired from Izu Peninsula in Japan. However, 14 of them would die of erysipelas within four months. Following the outbreak, it became standard procedure in the park to immediately vaccinate new animals against the disease, though this practice was stopped almost a decade later around 1983, due to concerns about the vaccine's toxicity. No further issues with erysipelas have since been recorded at Ocean Park.

Soon after the erysipelas outbreak, melioidosis infections would also kill an additional 24 bottlenose dolphins, 4 pilot whales, and 5 harbour seals between 1975 and 1976. According to Yuen Kwok-yung, a microbiologist at the University of Hong Kong, the outbreak may have been intensified by Ocean Park's practice of burying dead dolphins near its coast. (Note: Ocean Park no longer does this and now cremates its dead cetaceans instead, a practice that was adopted before 1997 at the latest.) Yuen explains that bacteria in the corpses would wash into the sea after heavy rainfall, which would also lower the water's salinity and allow the bacteria to multiply. This contaminated seawater would then be drawn up for the park's animal tanks. The park would continue to be affected by melioidosis infections for the following decade, with the disease contributing to 73% of cetacean deaths in 1976–1978, and 57% in 1979–1983. However, some of these deaths may not have been completely due to melioidosis, as later examinations revealed that at least three of the dolphins that died also had other existing medical conditions. (Note: One of the dolphins was determined during autopsy to have died from melioidosis and sepsis from Staphylococcus infections, but was later found to have also been suffering from a severely debilitating spinal abscess. In at least two other cases, the dolphin's death was attributed to sepsis caused by melioidosis, but post-mortem histopathology examinations later revealed that an underlying viral hepatitis had triggered the sepsis instead.)

A later report, published in 1994 in Asian Marine Biology, admitted that Ocean Park experienced "serious problems [that led to] poor survival" during the first 13–14 years of operations. Among the paper's authors was Stephen Leatherwood, then-veterinary and education director of the Ocean Park Conservation Foundation. The study reported on the survival rates of 139 cetaceans housed at Ocean Park from 1974 to 1994, of which only 32 remained by September 1996. The survivorship record for the park's 54 Pacific bottlenose dolphins (Tursiops gilli) was described as "very poor", with an annual survival rate of 24.5%. Apart from deaths related to erysipelas and melioidosis, food poisoning and gastritis were also responsible, causing 9 deaths. The report attributed these to "start-up problems", which it said "certainly bespeak a failure in husbandry and veterinary practices". However, it suggested that the species' innately poor adaptability to captivity was also involved, reporting that the park's 44 Indo-Pacific bottlenose dolphins (Tursiops aduncus) had a much higher annual survival rate of 82.8%, albeit still "below the industry average [of 93%]". The park's five short-finned pilot whales also suffered from poor survivability, with all of them dying within 10 weeks of their arrival back in July 1976.

The overall poor survival rates of Ocean Park's cetaceans were attributed to "periodic overstocking, often with species poorly suited for survival in Hong Kong's climate", (Note: The Pacific bottlenose dolphins sourced from Japan lived in a more temperate climate, and thus were ill-suited to Hong Kong's warmer weather and endemic bacteria. Conversely, the Indo-Pacific bottlenose dolphins sourced from the closer Penghu Islands adapted more readily.) and the "initial inadequacy of the water filtration, purification, and chilling system". The report wrote that these factors had since been addressed in some way, and annual survival rates began to improve in 1983. Reasons cited included an improving quality of veterinary care, an aggressive vaccination programme, and major improvements to the water intake and purification system, among other factors.

==== Park development ====
Between 1982 and 1984, the Jockey Club invested a further HK$240 million into developing facilities at Tai Shue Wan and thrill rides in the park's Summit area. In July 1987, Ocean Park ceased to be part of the Jockey Club, instead becoming a statutory body incorporated under the Ocean Park Corporate Ordinance. Its board of directors is appointed by the government. The Jockey Club established a HK$200 million trust to ensure the park's continued development. At present, Ocean Park is managed by the Ocean Park Corporation, a financially independent, not-for-profit organisation.

=== 21st century ===
Ocean Park had maintained an income surplus since its opening, until the 1997 Asian financial crisis, which resulted in four consecutive years of deficits totaling HK$204.1 million. The park briefly recovered in the 2001–2002 financial year, recording HK$15.3 million in profit and a 23% increase in attendance up to 3.4 million. However, it was soon severely impacted by the 2003 SARS outbreak in Hong Kong, which saw tourism numbers fall and locals stay home, resulting in a roughly 70% decrease in the park's attendance. Ocean Park was subsequently threatened with the possibility of closure, and also faced competition from the planned Hong Kong Disneyland in the coming years.

In response, businessman Allan Zeman was brought on as chairman in 2003 by the city's chief executive, Tung Chee-hwa. At the time, Zeman was known for leading the creation of the city's popular nightlife district, Lan Kwai Fong. With the challenges Ocean Park was facing, Zeman later recounted that he thought Tung was "out of his mind", but ultimately took the position following repeated pleas by Tung. Half of the park's board was also replaced. That same year, the Chinese government launched the Individual Visit Scheme, which brought an influx of mainland Chinese tourists to Hong Kong, allowing the park to rebound in the 2003–2004 financial year with profits of HK$95.7 million.

As Ocean Park sought to differentiate itself from the incoming Hong Kong Disneyland, the park re-envisioned its future as a world-class marine-themed park with focuses on animals and nature, and also emphasised its origins as Hong Kong's own home-grown entertainment brand. Zeman had earlier replaced the park's chief executive officer with Thomas Mehrmann, who held executive positions at Knott's Berry Farm, a theme park located only seven miles from Disneyland in California. In March 2005, the park unveiled a HK$5.55 billion (US$707 million) redevelopment plan, which would see the park's size increase from 30 ha (74 acres) to 43.8 ha (108 acres), the number of attractions double to more than 70, and an additional 33 animal species introduced. The park's Lowland area was to be redeveloped as Waterfront, with three themed attraction zones, respectively featuring an aquarium complex (Aqua City), a tropical aviary (Birds of Paradise), and a port-themed family area (Whiskers' Harbour). Meanwhile, Headland would be redeveloped as Summit, with four climate-themed attraction zones, named Marine World, Rainforest, Thrill Mountain, and Polar Adventure. Construction began in November 2006 and would take place in eight phases over the following six years.

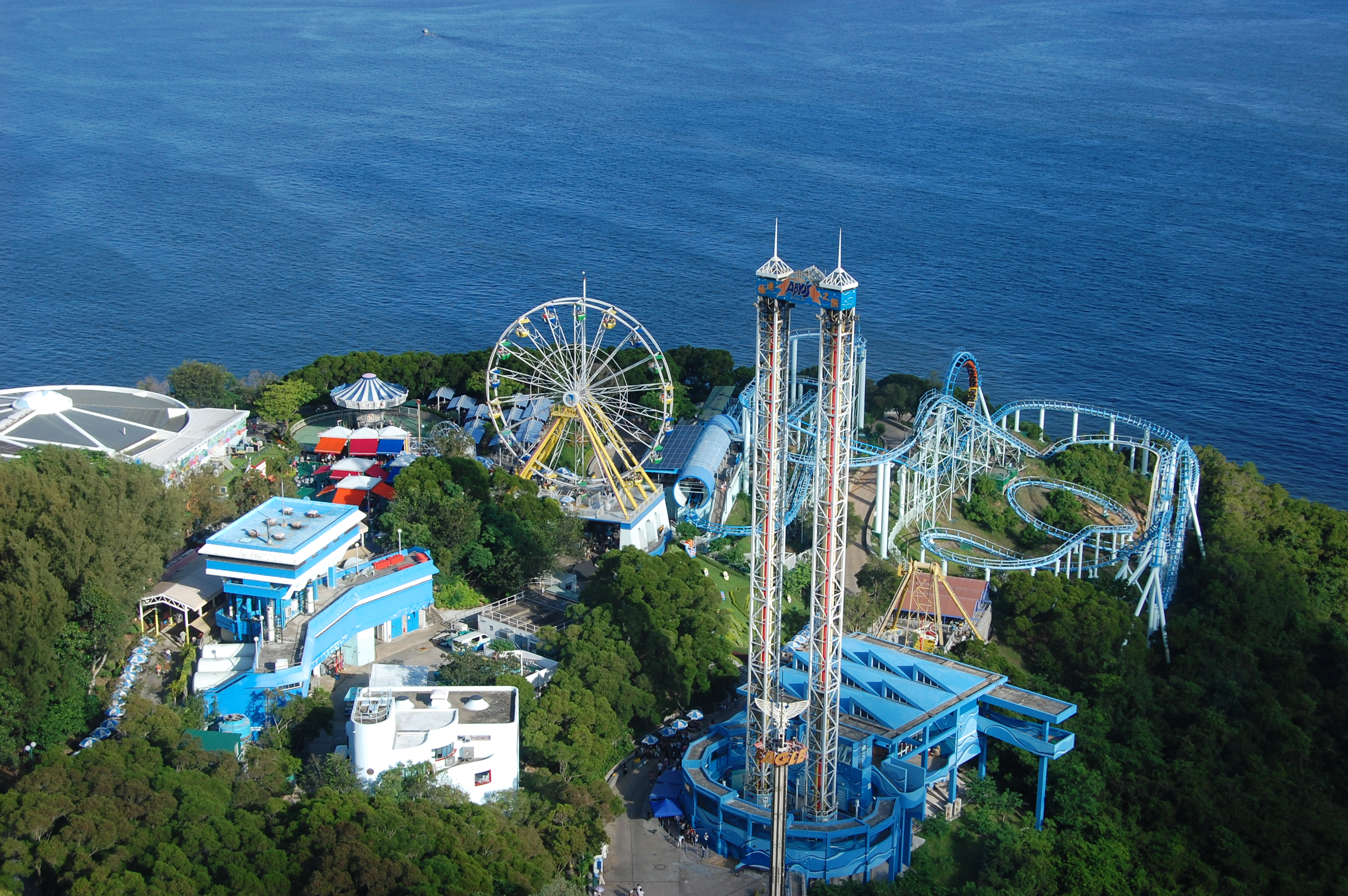
Some of the rides at Marine World, an attraction zone formerly named Headlands Rides

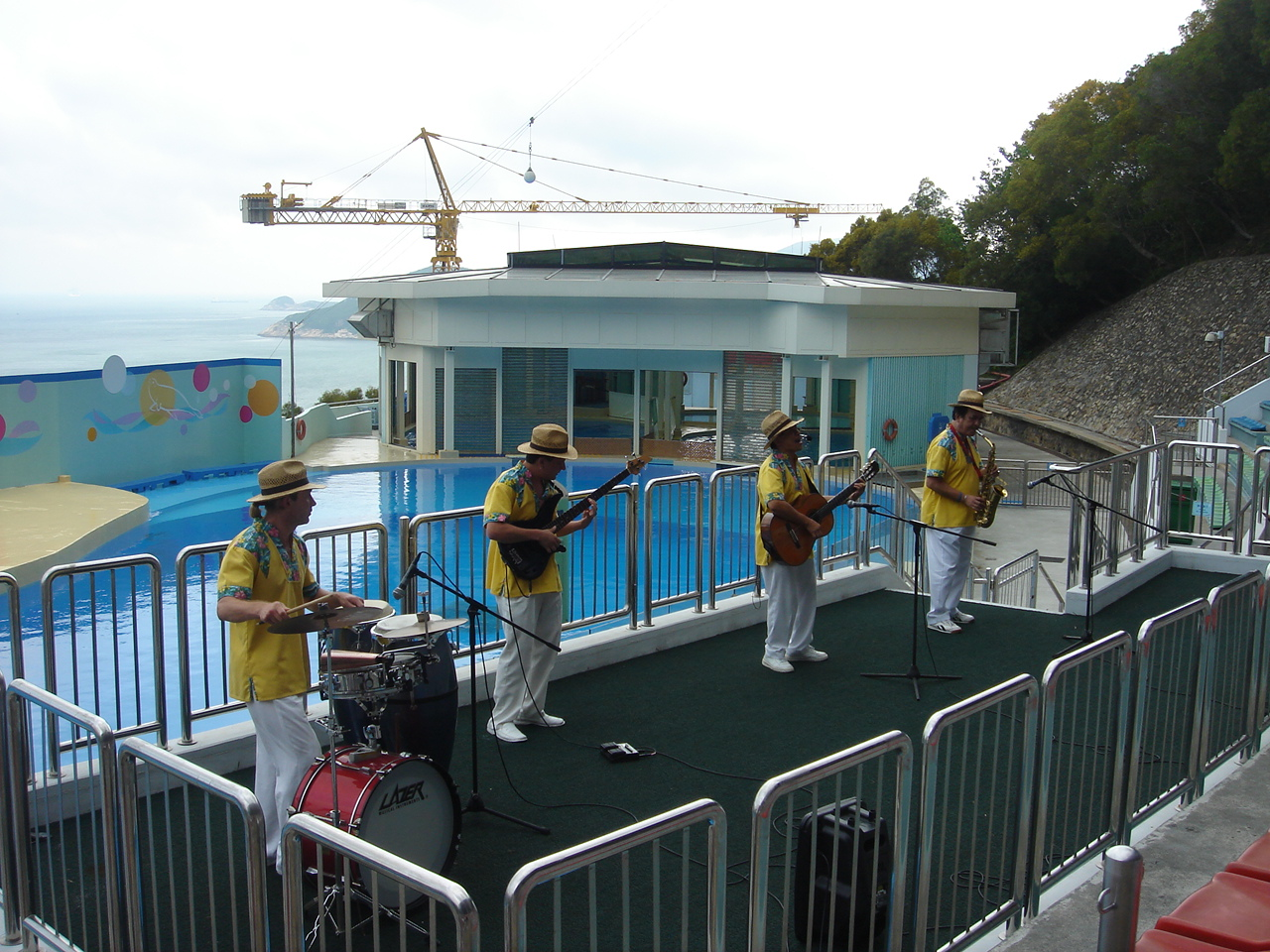
Musicians performing at the Ocean Theatre

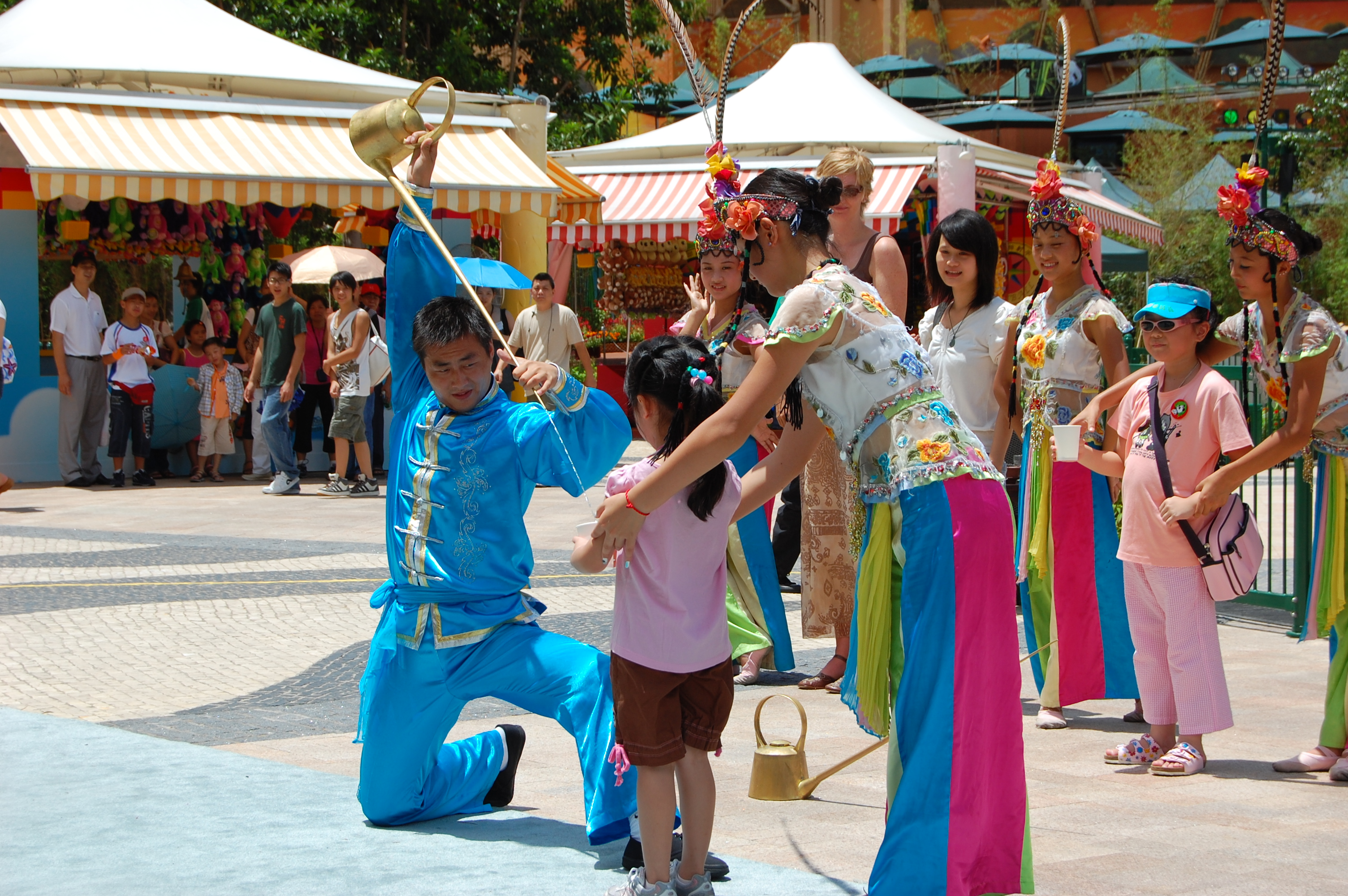
The Culture Show

Hong Kong Disneyland opened in September 2005, and Ocean Park expected up to a 25% decrease in attendance, but the park was not severely impacted in the end. It recorded an average daily attendance of 10,000 during Disneyland's opening period, down from the 11,000 visitors during the same time the previous year. The park later surpassed its own annual attendance record in May 2006, less than 11 months after it set a record of 4,030,000 visitors. Forbes magazine subsequently recognised the park as one of the "10 Most Popular Amusement Parks in the World", and further dubbed Zeman "Hong Kong's Mouse Killer" in 2007.

The first attractions of the redevelopment plan were opened in 2009. This included the Ocean Express, a funicular system connecting the Waterfront and Summit, and the Amazing Asian Animals attraction zone, which showcased rare Asian animals, namely the giant panda, the red panda, the Chinese giant salamander, the Asian small-clawed otter, and the Chinese alligator. Four red pandas were loaned to Ocean Park by the Chengdu Research Base of Giant Panda Breeding.

In January 2011, the Aqua City attraction zone was opened. The zone covers an area of 20,000 m^{2} (220,000 sq ft) and features the Grand Aquarium as its centerpiece. Designed by Aedas and PGAV Destinations, the aquarium's exterior mimics a sea creature, appearing as an egg-shaped structure with swirling strips of fins. It features a 5.24-million L (1.38-million US gal) water tank. At opening, it housed more than 5,000 fish belonging to more than 400 species, including rare species such as the scalloped hammerhead shark, the manta ray, and the Pacific bluefin tuna. The attraction zone also featured a daily nighttime show named Symbio, presented on a 360° water screen.

A few months later in June 2011, Ocean Park also opened the 5,500 m^{2} (59,000 sq ft) Rainforest attraction zone, which featured a three-minute raft ride, an expedition trail, and a treehouse-themed exhibition area. At opening, the zone housed over 70 tropical animal species, including the kinkajou, the capybara, the pygmy marmoset, the green anaconda, and the green aracari.

In March 2012, the new attraction zone Old Hong Kong opened, evoking the streetscapes and spirit of Hong Kong between the 1950s and the 1970s from various perspectives. In April, the newly refurbished Hong Kong Jockey Club Sichuan Treasures opened. In July, the final element of the redevelopment, Polar Adventure, opened, featuring animals such as penguins, Pacific walruses, spotted seals, northern sea lions, snowy owls and Arctic foxes, aiming to highlight some of the conservation issues they face.

In November 2012, Ocean Park became the first theme park in Asia to win the Applause Award, an award presented by Liseberg and considered the most prestigious in the amusement and theme park industry. The park also received three Brass Ring Awards from the International Association of Amusement Parks and Attractions.

In June 2014, the park opened its new shark aquarium, Shark Mystique, which was ranked as one of Asia's largest shark exhibits at the time. Shark Mystique features a 2.2-million L (0.58-million US gal) tank viewable through a 360° panorama that spirals down three storeys. At opening, the aquarium housed 130 sharks and rays from 15 species, including the critically endangered largetooth sawfish and ragged-tooth shark. It was the first major attraction to open after the completion of the 2005 redevelopment project.

In July 2014, Zeman stepped down as chairman after serving for 11 years. He revealed that he wished to continue but had been forced out by the government, a decision he believed to be due to a government guideline that limited positions on statutory bodies to six-year terms. Earlier in December 2013, the park had posted a record surplus of HK$127.2 million and also a record attendance of 7.73 million for the 2012–2013 financial year, up from the HK$4 million deficit and 2.95 million visitors recorded in the 2002–2003 financial year.

On 19 February 2019, the park opened its first hotel, The Hong Kong Ocean Park Marriott Hotel.

==== Financial struggle and recovery ====
In January 2020, the park sought HK$10 billion from the government for a major upgrade, following a 14% decline in visitor numbers and a cash-flow crisis. The government was ready to support the move, but both pro-Beijing and pro-democracy legislators expressed concerns.

On 21 September 2021, Ocean Park opened to the public its brand new water park, named Water World. Occupying an area of 55,740 m^{2} (600,000 sq ft), Water World is located near the main park on a hillside in Tai Shue Wan and charges admission separately from the main park. It is Asia's first all-season water park. It offered 27 indoor and outdoor attractions at opening, when it operated at half capacity (4,500 visitors) due to social distancing measures under the COVID-19 pandemic. The water park was originally planned to open in 2017 and had an estimated cost of HK$2.29 billion (US$294.2 million), which ultimately increased to HK$4 billion (US$531 million) following years of delays. It is the first major project of Ocean Park's revamp.

In October 2021, Ocean Park posted a deficit of HK$31.8 million (US$4 million) in the financial year ending 30 June 2021. It had earlier received HK$1.45 billion of government funding intended to support the park amid closures due to the COVID-19 pandemic.

In December 2023, Ocean Park posted a surplus of HK$118.5 million (US$15.18 million) in the financial year ending 30 June 2023, following years of deficits. The number of visitors to Ocean Park and its Water World had a 45% year-on-year growth, up to 2.4 million. This turnaround was attributed to the gradual recovery of tourism in Hong Kong, following the full reopening of the city's borders in February 2023 after the end of the COVID-19 pandemic.

==== Future developments ====
===== Adventure Zone (2024–28) =====
A plan for an adventure zone to replace the Park's Adventure Land area first emerged in 2020, when the Park asked the HKSAR for HK$10 billion to fund its long-anticipated expansion plan, which includes replacing Adventure Land with Adventure Valley and replacing Raging River with a luge track. When this plan was suspended and replaced by the rebirth plan, the concept of Adventure Valley was retained and presented as 'Adventure Zone', but now built and operated by an external operator instead of internally. Some key attractions in the area include a 'X-Raycer', an Alpine Coaster, Ziplines and Tubing. Construction for the area started in late 2024 and the area will be completed in early to mid 2028.

===== Tai Shue Wan Pier =====
Along with Adventure Zone, the construction of a pier at Tai Shue Wan was also proposed in the rebirth plan to better connectivity between the Resort and the Southern District. A temporary pier, funded by the Ocean Park opened on 8 August 2023, provided good ferry service to and from the Resort during the first few months of its debut. A permanent structure is set to replace the existing temporary boat pier, with construction starting in 2025 and completion later in the decade.

=== Visitor growth ===
The park's expansion steadily grew visitor numbers to 7.6 million in 2014, making it the world's 13th most visited theme park, and one of the largest theme parks in Asia. From this high, visitor numbers declined to around six million in 2016 against the background of declining tourist arrivals in Hong Kong and competition from Chimelong International Ocean Tourist Resort in Zhuhai. In January 2017, the Ocean Park saw a 30% surge in visitors, credited to a new rapid transit line, big discounts and an early Lunar New Year holiday, but in 2019, lower numbers of mainland tourist arrivals, due to social unrest and continued competition from Chimelong, sunk attendance to 5.7 million. In the 2023–24 financial year, attendance rose by 33% to 3.14 million, and in the year ending June 2025 it grew by a further 10% to 3.46 million.

== Park layout and attractions ==
Ocean Park consists of two main attraction areas, the Waterfront and the Summit. They are separated by the Brick Hill, and thus are connected by a cable car system and by an underground funicular system. Together, the two areas are further subdivided into seven attraction zones, Amazing Asian Animals, Aqua City, Whiskers Harbour, Marine World, Polar Adventure, Thrill Mountain, and the Rainforest.

=== Internal transport ===
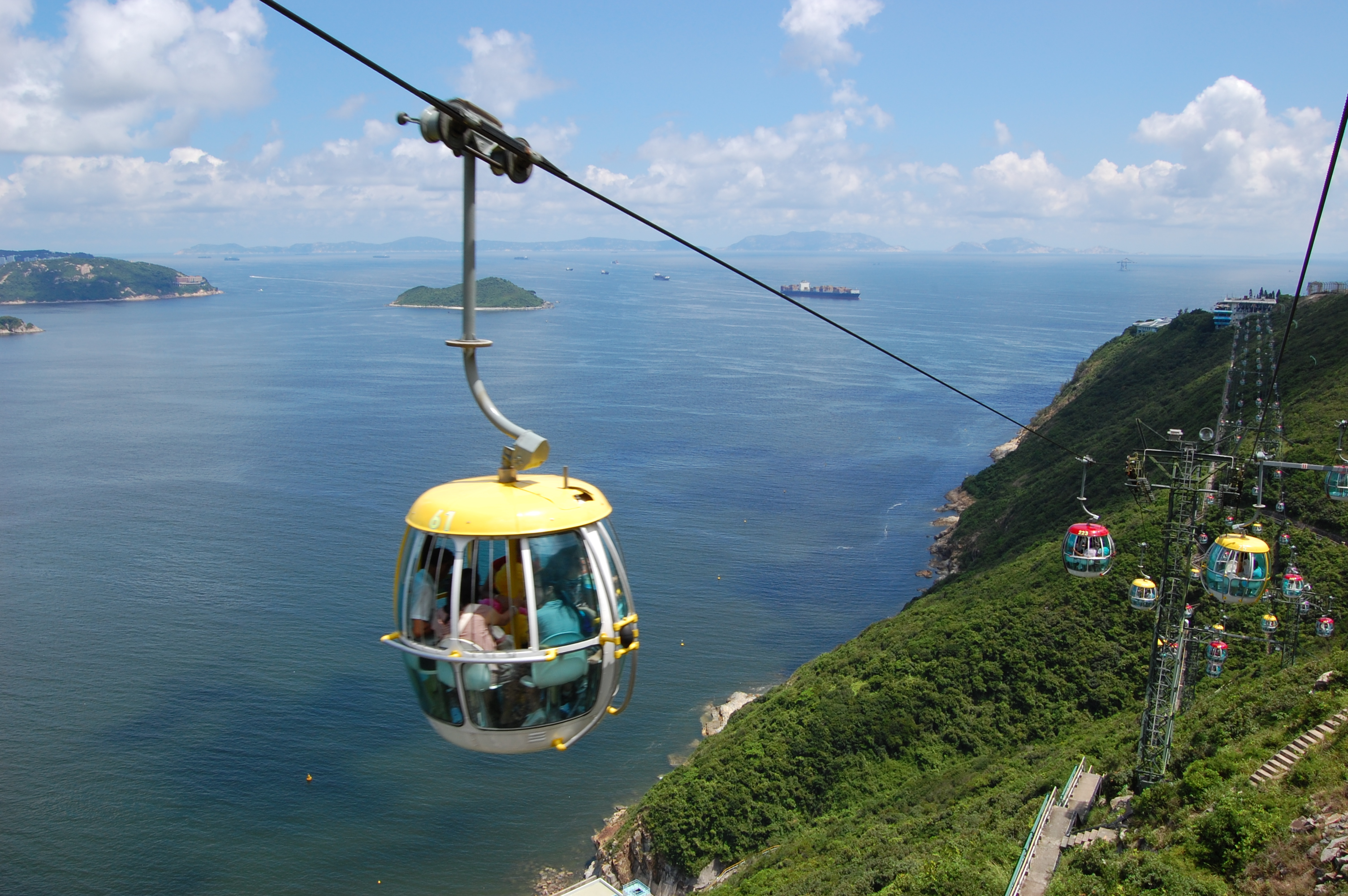
Ocean Park cable car

Ocean Park features a 1.5-kilometre (0.93 mi) long cable car system connecting the Waterfront and the Summit in an eight-minute journey, with the views of the South China Sea. It has a capacity of 4,000 passengers per hour with 252 cable cars on two pairs of ropeways. Each car can hold six passengers. The system is considered a signature of the park.

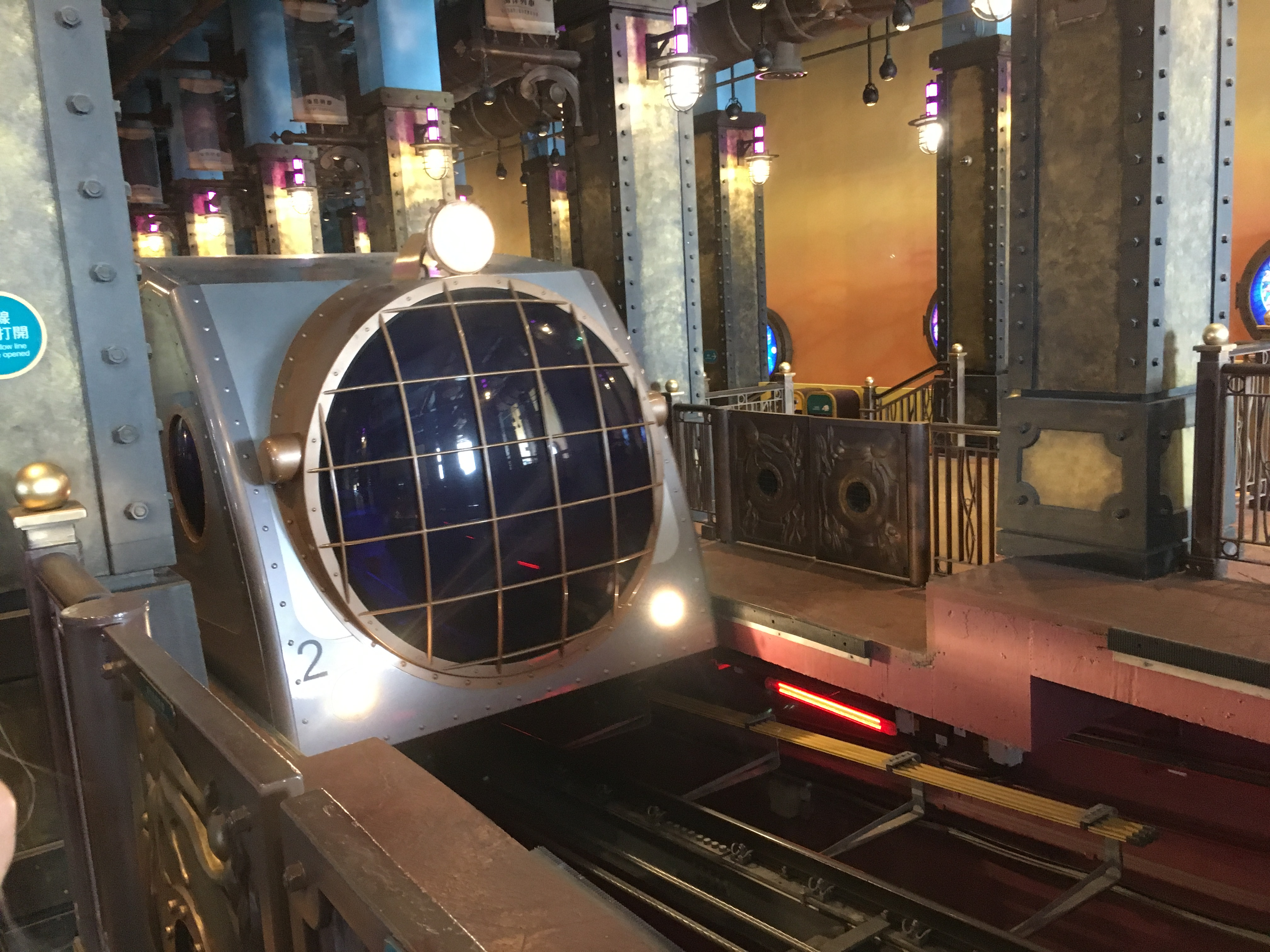
Ocean Express funicular railway

The Waterfront and Summit areas are also connected by the Ocean Express, a tunnel funicular system that opened on 9 September 2009. Two trains, one going uphill and one downhill, travel simultaneously in a 1.3-kilometre (0.81 mi) tunnel through Brick Hill at a maximum speed of 7 m/s (23 ft/s). Each train carries up to 250 passengers and has 40 seats. They are themed to resemble submarines, featuring dimmed lights and animations playing on ceiling panels to simulate an underwater environment. The Ocean Express was included in the park's 2005 redevelopment plan to supplement the cable car system, in preparation for future increases in the park's attendance. The system was built by Swiss company Garaventa, while the trains were made by Gangloff Switzerland.

Ocean Park also contains Hong Kong's second-longest outdoor escalator system, which connects attraction zones in the Summit area. Constructed in 1984, the system spans 220 m (720 ft) and is covered by a clear tunnel. It was previously the world's longest outdoor escalator system, until the completion of the Central–Mid-Levels escalators in October 1993.

=== The Summit ===
==== Marine World ====
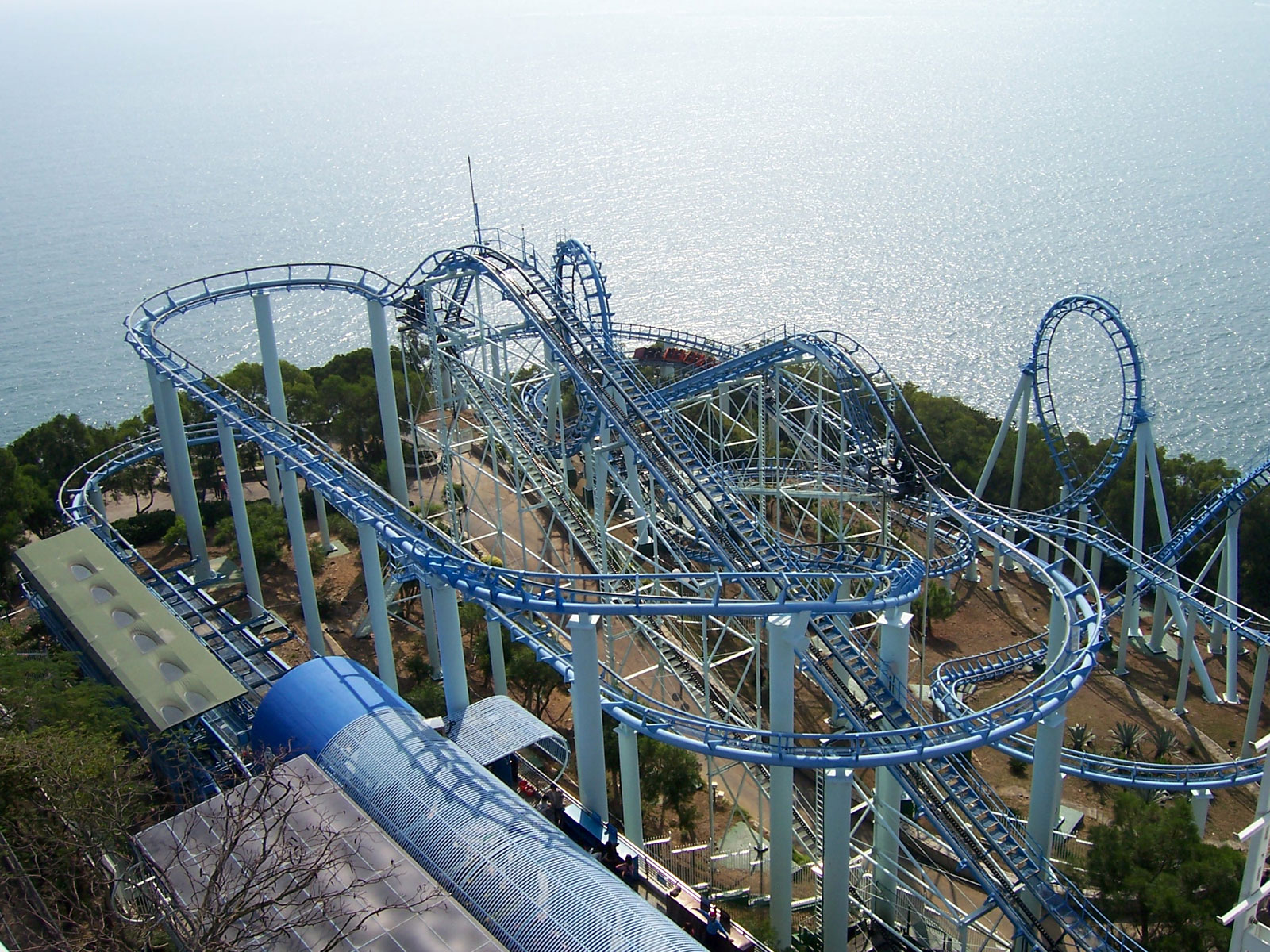
The now-defunct Dragon rollercoaster

This area was formerly known as two distinct areas: Marine Land and Headlands Rides.

- Pacific Pier – Mimics the rocky habitat of harbour seals and California sea lions on the Northern Californian coast.
- Ocean Park tower
- Sea Jelly Spectacular – Opened in 2006. Southeast Asia's first standalone sea jelly exhibit.
- Flying Swing
- Wild Twister – A Mondial Ventura
- Crazy Galleon – A Huss Pirate ship
- Ferris Wheel
- Marine World Games Zone

==== Thrill Mountain ====
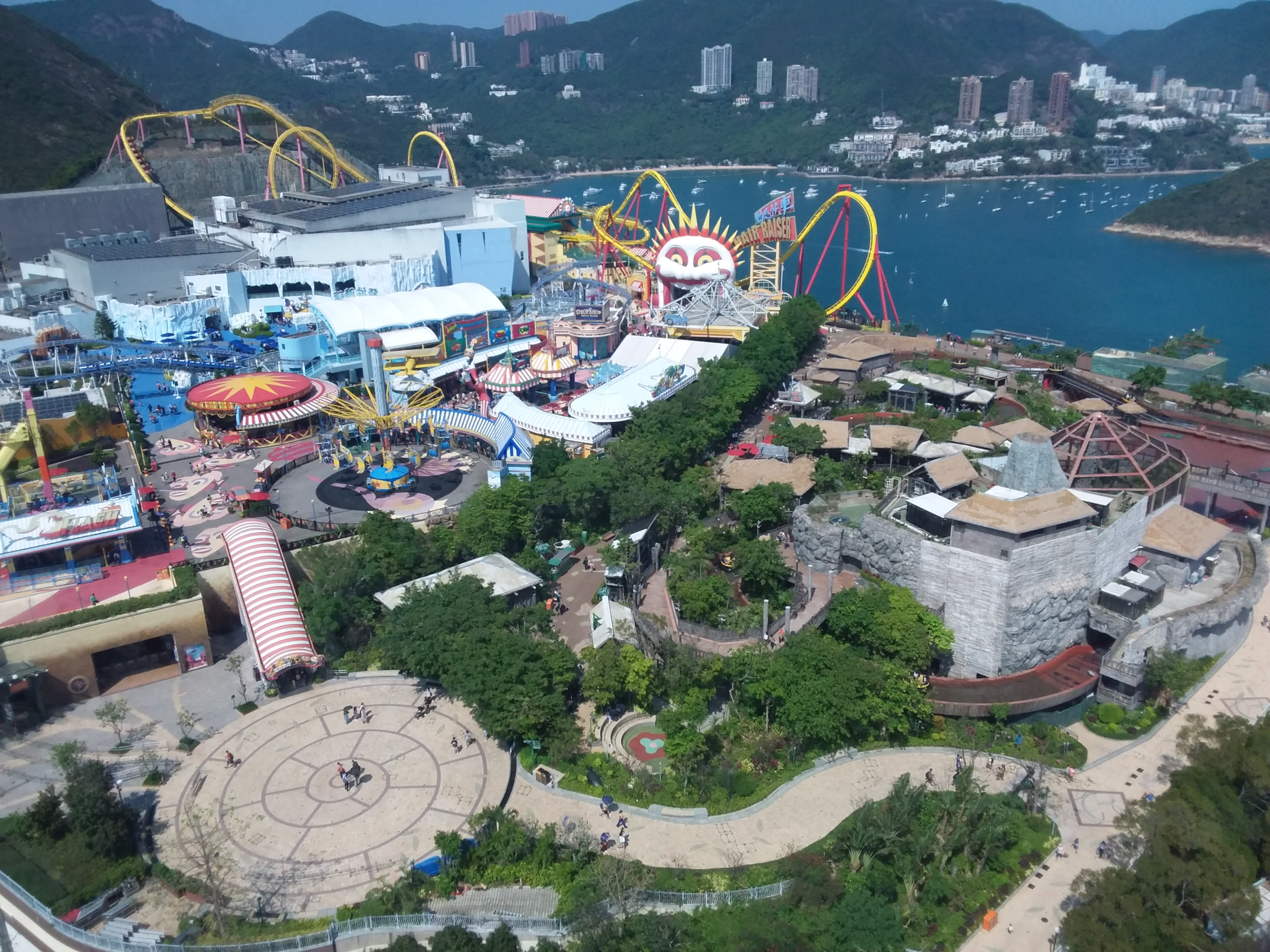
Thrill Mountain and Polar Adventure areas.

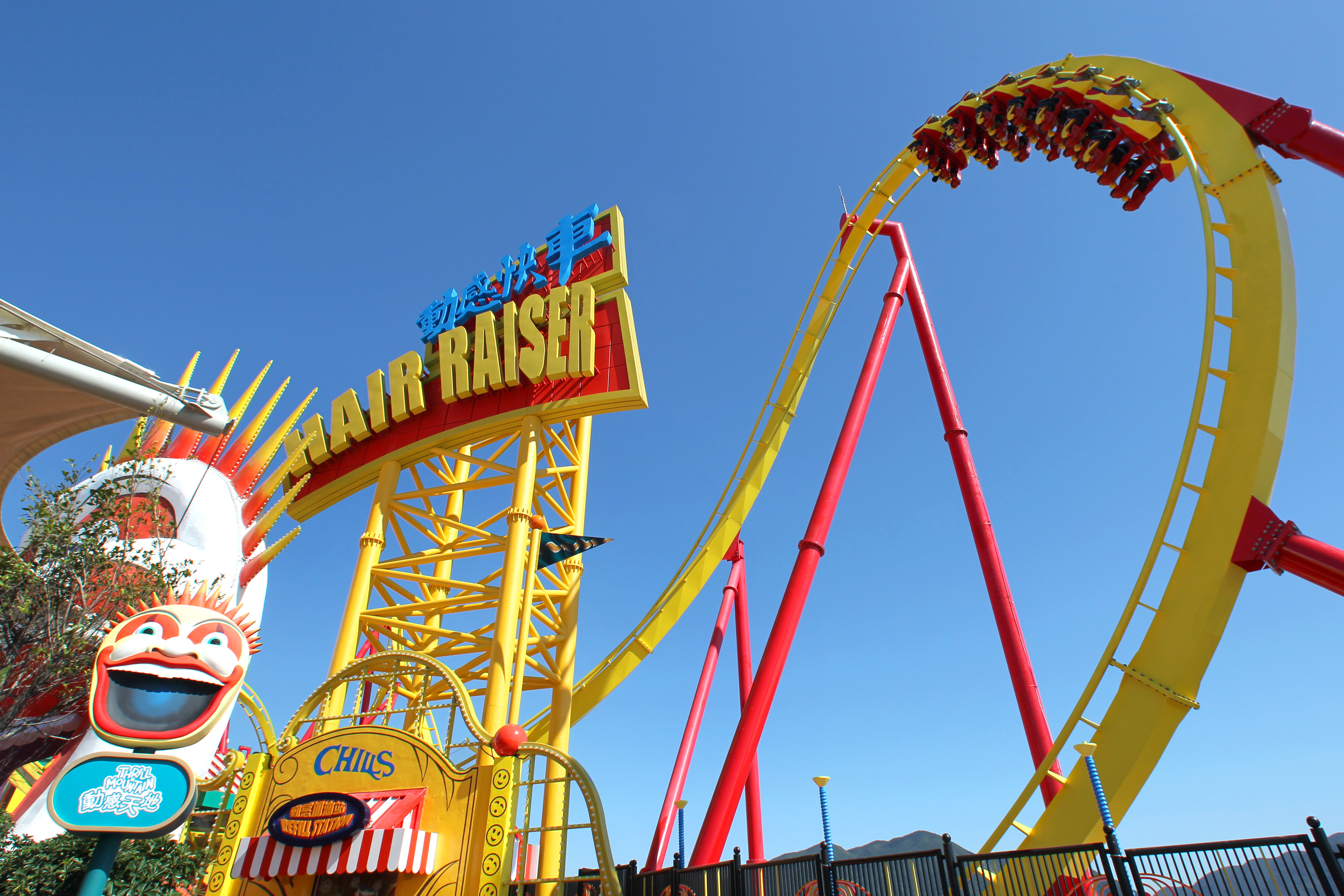
Thrill Mountain – Hair Raiser

Thrill Mountain was opened in December 2011 and occupies 222,800 sq ft (20,700 m^{2}). The area is carnival-themed, and features five rides and six booth games.

- Hair Raiser – A floorless rollercoaster built by B&M with four inversions.
- Whirly Bird – A chair swing ride that soars 30 m (98 ft) into the air
- Bumper Blaster – Bumper cars that can carry two in each car
- Rev Booster – A spinner ride
- The Flash – A swing ride that goes upside down, with a top speed of 60 km/h (37 mph), at a height of 22 m (72 ft) up into the air

==== Polar Adventure ====
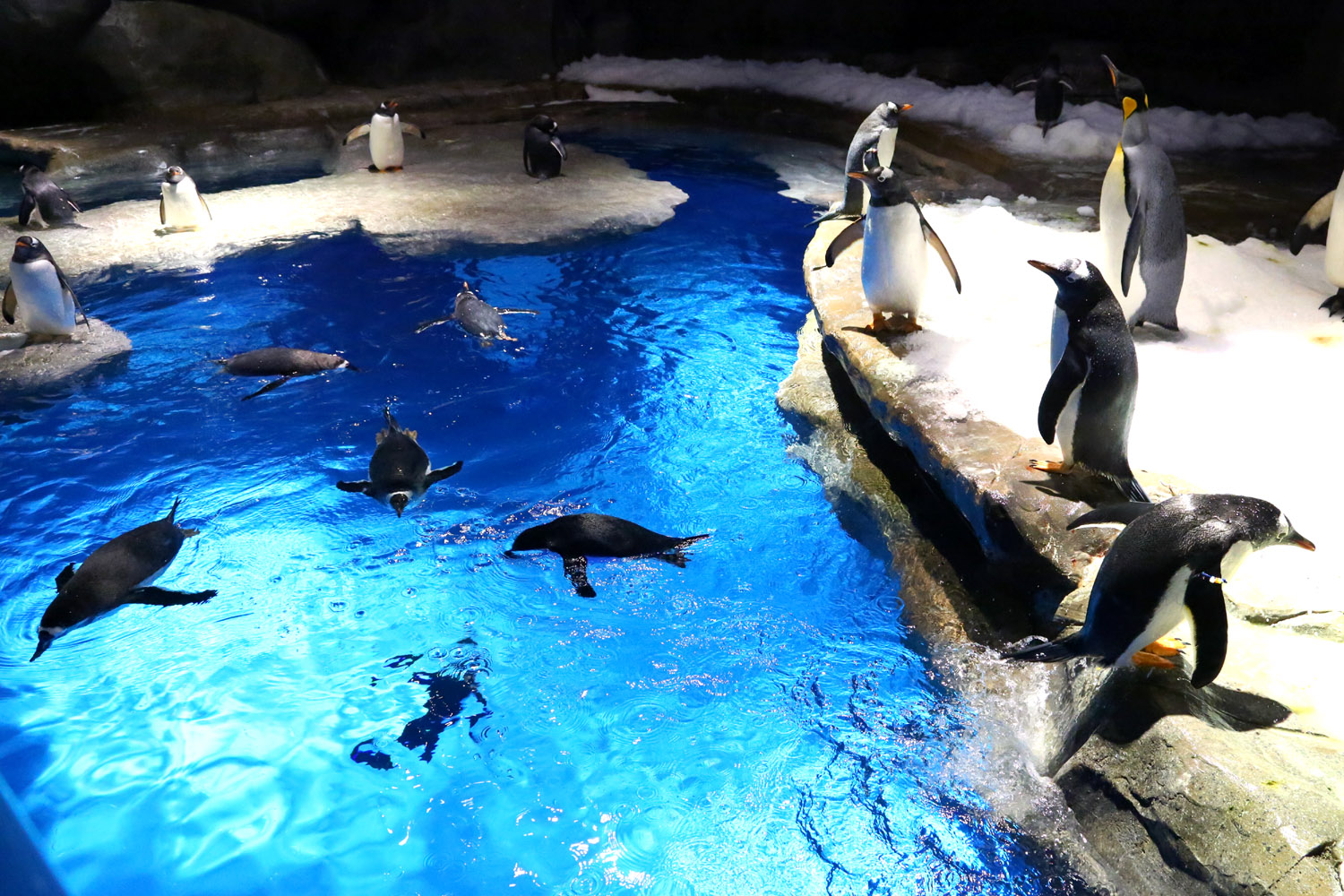
South Pole Spectacular – Penguin

Polar Adventure was opened on 13 July 2012. The area features the North Pole Encounter, South Pole Spectacular and Arctic Fox Den, as well as the Arctic Blast roller coaster.

The attraction's carbon footprint is reduced through environmental technology, including a ventilation system that recycles residual cool air to cool down the Life Support System (LSS) and plant room area before being discharged, which it is claimed reduces electricity consumption by a third.

- Arctic Blast – A steel "roller coaster" located in the Polar Adventure with various dips and side turns. It is suitable for the whole family.
- North Pole Encounter – visitors can meet Pacific walruses and spotted seals, and other animals from the North Pole including Steller sea lions and snowy owls. The animals can also be viewed via an underwater tunnel.
- South Pole Spectacular – It is home to three penguin species: king penguins, southern rockhopper penguins and gentoo penguins. The viewing chamber, glass-panelled floors, walkways and balconies overlooking the water allow visitors to see the penguins from different angles.
- Arctic Fox Den – visitors can see Arctic foxes here to learn about their behaviour and the impact of humans on their habitat.

==== The Rainforest ====
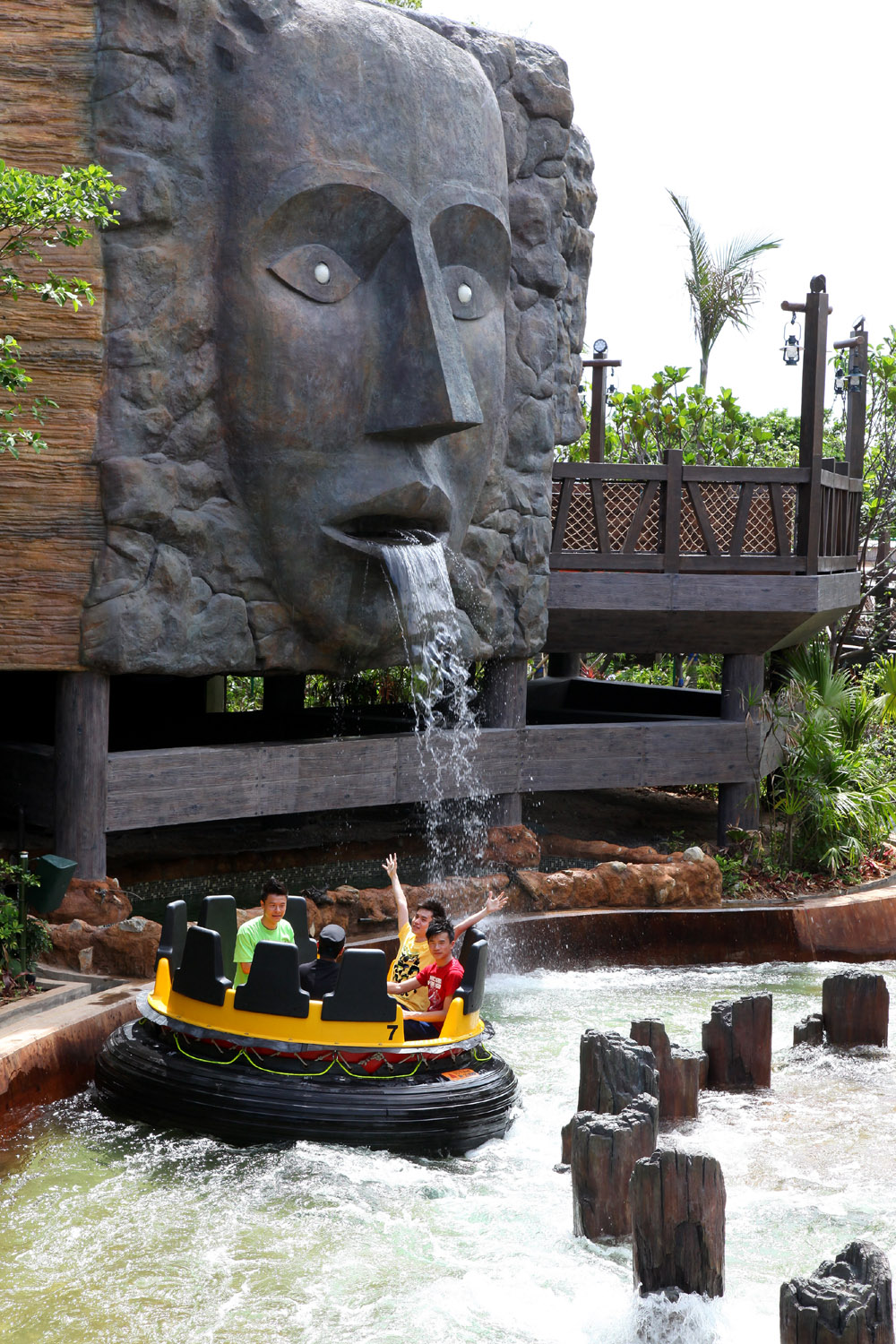
Rainforest – The Rapids

The Rainforest was opened on 14 June 2011. Dozens of avian, terrestrial and aquatic animals living inside buttress roots accompany visitors on their immersive exploration of biodiversity. Prepare to be soaked on The Rapids, as water guns and sudden drops will get you wet from head to toe.

- The Rapids – A family river rapids ride along a rushing river that surrounds the themed zone.
- Expedition Trail – A walk-through rainforest exhibits where, visitors can meet some of the world's most striking tropical species, including Linnaeus's two-toed sloths, kinkajous, capybaras, toco toucans, green anacondas and more.
- Rainforest Why Zone – Trainers explain about rainforest animals in the wild and in captivity.

=== The Waterfront ===
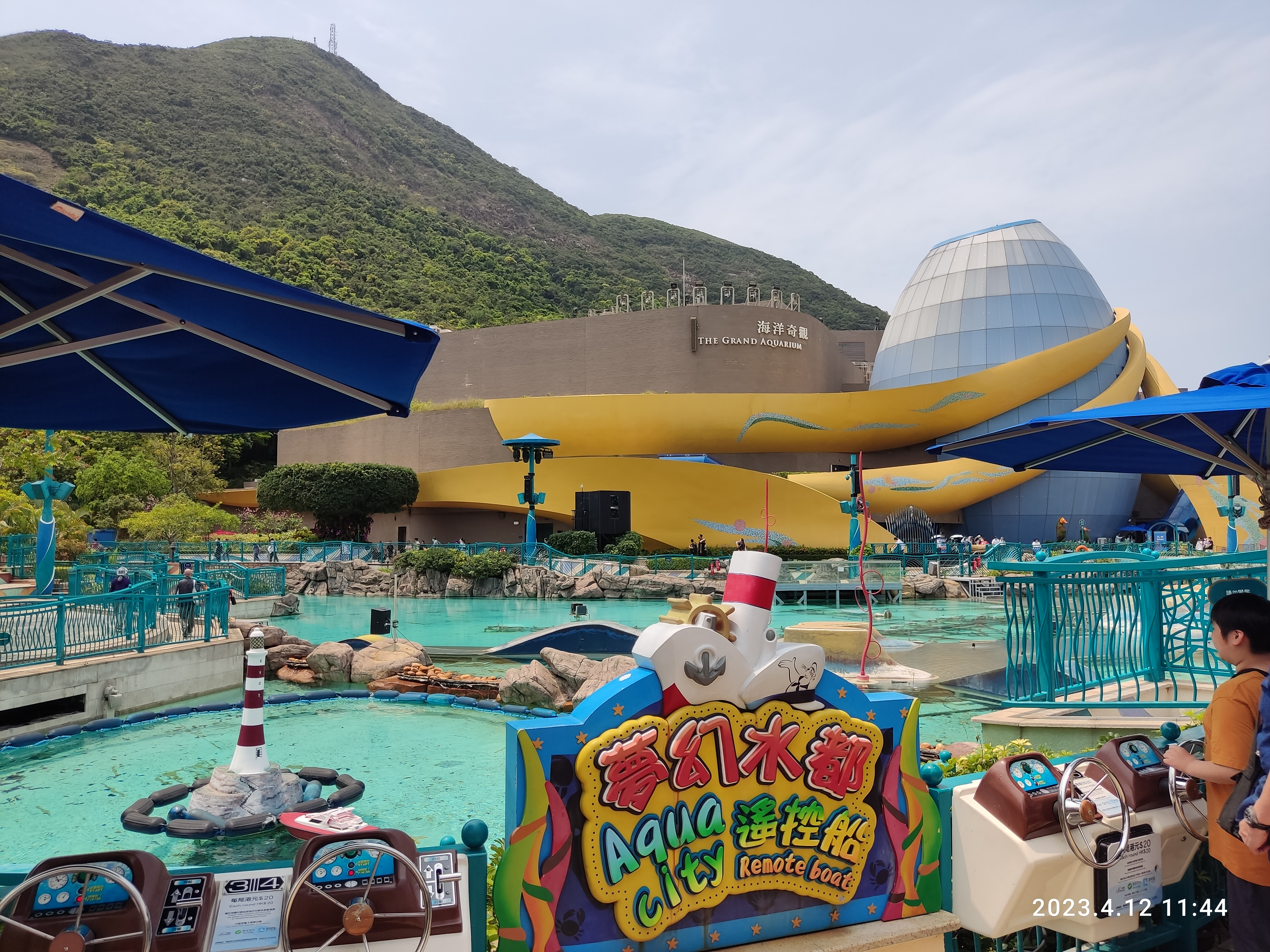
The Grand Aquarium

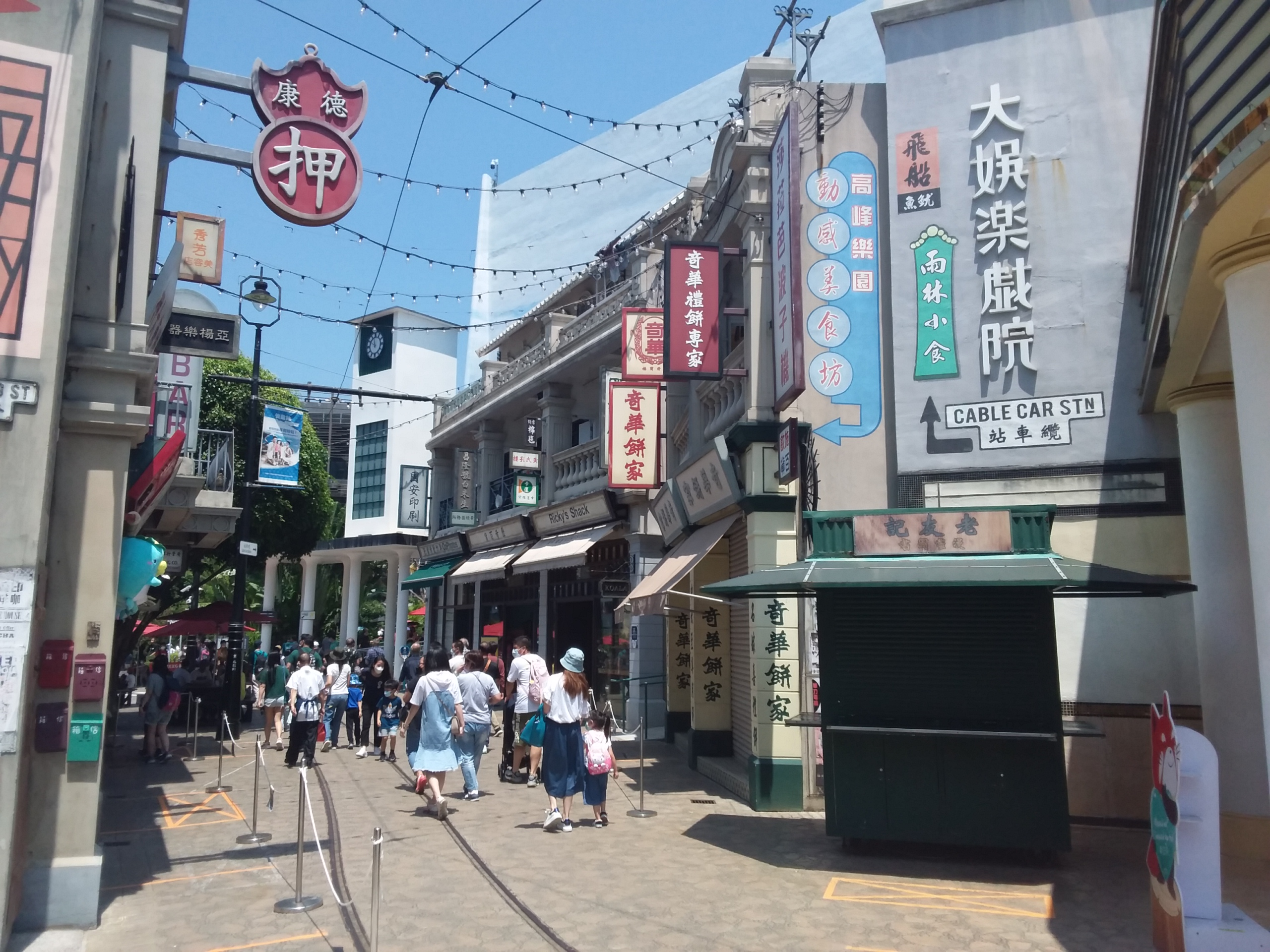
Old Hong Kong

==== Aqua City ====
Aqua City was opened on 26 January 2011 and occupies around 200.000 square feet. It features:

- Grand Aquarium – Inside the Grand Aquarium, visitors can get up close to some 5,000 fish from over 400 species, such as the scalloped hammerhead and reef manta ray. Strolling through the Reef Tunnel and Panoramic Ocean Gallery, visitors can see the world's largest viewing dome in an aquarium, at 5.5 metres in diameter, and a 13-metre acrylic viewing panel, one of the largest in the world. It also features "Symbio!", the world's first and only 360° water screen show, and Hong Kong's only restaurant inside an aquarium.
- Sea Life Carousel – Hong Kong's largest carousel, 15.1 metres across, with 61 carriers in 13 different designs inspired by endangered sea animals, holding up to 81 passengers.
- Old Hong Kong – Offers an immersive experience of culture, history, and delicacies of Hong Kong between the 1950s and the 1970s. It features a replica of Edinburgh Place Ferry Pier's clock tower and its signature toll, a manually retrofitted heritage tramcar and rows of tong lau-style apartment buildings. Visitors can also try more than 70 types of local street food and beverage that evoke the flavour of old Hong Kong. The area also provides a wide array of classic booth games.
- Waterfront Plaza – Features a lively carnival setting with a rotating mix of shows, magic and other acts performed by clowns, acrobats and jugglers. This area sets the backdrop for many of Ocean Park's festive events.

==== Amazing Asian Animals ====
- Giant Panda Adventure – A purpose-built habitat that houses 2 rare giant pandas - Ying Ying, and Le Le as well as red pandas. It also houses the critically endangered Chinese giant salamander.
- Panda Village – displays Asian small-clawed otters and a variety of Asian bird life in a woodland setting.
- Gator Marsh – A wetland setting, featuring endangered Chinese alligators from the Yangtze River.
- Goldfish Treasures – A goldfish pavilion featuring the latest and rarest varieties such as the Black Oranda and Blue Phoenix Eggfish. Explains the history and importance of the goldfish in Chinese culture.
- Hong Kong Jockey Club Sichuan Treasures – home to two golden snub-nosed monkeys, Le Le and Qi Qi, from Sichuan. Le Le and Qi Qi's offspring, Lokie (born 2017), is the first golden monkey born in Hong Kong and also resides there. The exhibit also acts as a resource centre on the care and conservation of this species. Pandas Jia Jia and An An also once lived there until their deaths.
- Emerald Trail – A verdant garden featuring natural settings with flowers, tall trees, stone bridges and gentle pools.

==== Whiskers Harbour ====
Whiskers Harbour, previously called Kid's World, features attractions for younger children, over an area 14,200 square metres.

- Balloon Up-up-and-away – A hot air balloon-themed Ferris wheel for very young visitors.
- Clown a Round – This merry-go-round has clown cars for younger kids to whirl around in.
- Frog Hopper – A kid's version of a thrill ride. Young visitors strap into the mechanised 'frog', hop high into the air and land back on their feet.
- Merry-go-round – A classic children's merry-go-round with gilded fairytale horses.
- Bouncer House – An inflatable, fully padded, covered house for children to bounce around in.
- Whiskers Harbour Playground – A safe, child- (and parent)-friendly haven for kids to run around and explore slides, see-saws, tunnels and jungle gyms.
- Interactive Shadow Play – Kids get to play simple spelling and skill games on interactive multimedia screens. Correct answers are rewarded with audiovisual presentations.
- Animal Story Corner – Children can explore interactive educational displays about different land, air and sea animals, and what makes each of them distinct.
- Whiskers Harbour Games Zone – The area offers over twenty classic arcade games.
- Toto the Loco – A small train that takes young visitors through a mini forest to meet clowns playing accordions, cellos and violins.
- Little Meerkat and Giant Tortoise Adventure - A newly opened display that shows meerkats and Aldabra giant tortoises in a theme of the African Savannah

=== Former attractions ===
Former attractions of Ocean Park include:

- Atoll Reef. It was located in Marine Land (now Marine World). Closed in early 2011 after 34 years of operation, many of the animals were transferred to the new Grand Aquarium. It was converted into Shark Mystique, which houses several species of sharks.
- Middle Kingdom. Opened in 1990, this area featured traditional Chinese culture and heritage along with buildings resembling traditional Chinese buildings. It closed in 2001, but the Middle Kingdom Restaurant was in operation until 2007.
- The Bird Paradise area, located in Tai Sue Wan near Adventure Land, closed down in 2013. It contained The Aviaries and Flamingo Pond. Plans are underway to redevelop this area into Water World.
- Space Wheel: A HUSS Enterprise. Formerly located in the Adventure Land section of the park.
- Bungee Trampoline – A trampoline that allows visitors to jump really high while strapped in bungee harnesses. Formerly located in the Thrill Mountain section of the park.
- Eagle – A HUSS Condor.
- Mine Train (越礦飛車) – A steel "mine train" roller coaster perched on the edge of a cliff overlooking Aberdeen Harbour, closed on 31 August 2021.
- Raging River (滑浪飛船) – A log flume-type water ride that took passengers through "tropical waterfalls", narrow ravines and finished by shooting them down a slide at almost 60 km/h, closed on 31 August 2021.
- The Abyss – A turbo drop ride, closed on 31 August 2021.
- Chinese Sturgeon Aquarium – Yangtze River Exploration – The 3,500 square-metre freshwater aquarium housed Chinese sturgeons along with other native species of the Yangtze River, closed in 2019.
- The Dragon – An Arrow Dynamics Custom Looper, was the first rollercoaster to feature a Sidewinder. Closed in February 2021.

=== Rollercoasters ===
| Name | Type | Opened | Territory | Manufacturer | Height Restrictions | Track Length | Description |
|---|---|---|---|---|---|---|---|
| Arctic Blast | Powered Coaster | 2012 | Polar Adventure | Mack Rides | 1 m (3 ft 3 in) | Unknown | A Mack Rides powered family coaster which opened in 2012. The coaster has an arctic and blue theme. |
| Hair Raiser | Floorless Coaster | 2011 | Thrill Mountain | Bolliger & Mabillard | 1.4 m (4 ft 7 in) | 850 m (2,790 ft) | The first and only roller coaster to be manufactured by Bolliger & Mabillard in the park, and known for its views of the South China Sea. Some say the smiley face in the Entrance is based on Luna Park Sydney in Australia. The coaster features one vertical loop, one dive loop, one zero-g roll, and finally an immelmann. |

=== Water Rides ===
| Name | Type | Opened | Territory | Manufacturer | Height Restrictions | Description |
|---|---|---|---|---|---|---|
| The Rapids | River rapids ride | 2010 | Rainforest | Intamin | 1.2m (3 ft 11 in) | The Rapids opened in the Rainforest in 2010 as part of the park's expansion. Riders are able to interact with visitors in the Emerald Trail, as they may get wet by the water guns by the Trail. During the queue line, various bird species are also shown. |

=== Flat Rides ===
| Name | Type | Opened | Territory | Manufacturer | Height Restrictions | Current Status | Additional Information |
|---|---|---|---|---|---|---|---|
| Wild Twister | Top Scan | 2019 | Marine World | Mondial | 1.37m (4 ft 6 in) | Operating | Top scan ride. This flat ride is the first ride introduced in over 9 years, with the latest one being Arctic Blast. It's also the last ride to be built in the park in a long period of time as the park no longer invest on rides and closes down a large amount of old rides. |
| The Flash | Ultra Max | 2011 | Thrill Mountain | Mondial | 1.37m (4 ft 6 in) | Operating | An Ultra Max ride that opened in late 2011 along with other rides in Thrill Mountain. |
| Rev Booster | Music Express | 2011 | Thrill Mountain | SBF Visa Group | 1.3m (3 ft 3 in) | Operating | A Music Express ride that opened in late 2011 along with other rides in Thrill Mountain. |
| Whirly Bird | Star Flyer | 2011 | Thrill Mountain | Chance Rides | 1.22m (~4 ft) | Operating | A Star Flyer ride that opened in late 2011 along with other rides in Thrill Mountain. |
| Bumper Blaster | Dodgems | 2011 | Thrill Mountain | I.E. Park | Driver: 1.45m (4 ft 9 in) Rider: 1.2m (3 ft 11 in) | Operating | A Dodgems ride that opened in late 2011 along with other rides in Thrill Mountain. |
| Sea Life Carousel | Gallopers | 2009 | Aqua City | Wood Design Amusement Rides | Unaccompanied: 1.07m (3 ft 6 in) | Operating | An Ocean-themed Carousel. Manufactured by Wood Design Amusement Rides. |
| Flying Swing | Waveswinger | 1997 | Marine World | Zierer | 1.22m (~4 ft) | Operating; Closing soon | The Flying Swing opened at 'Headlands Thrills', the former name of the area 'Marine World'. This ride will be closed down soon due to increasing maintenance cost and will be transformed into a yoga activities space. |
| Ferris Wheel | Ferris Wheel | 1994 | Marine World | Chance Rides | Unaccompanied: 1.52m (4 ft 12 in) | Operating; Closing soon | A Chance Rides Ferris Wheel. This ride will be closed down soon due to increasing maintenance cost and will be transformed into a yoga activities space. |
| Crazy Galleon | Pirate Ship | 1984 | Marine World | HUSS | 1.22m (~4 ft) | Operating; Closing soon | The oldest flat ride still standing in the park (excluding other attractions). This ride will be closed down soon due to increasing maintenance cost and will be transformed into a yoga activities space. |

=== Transport Rides ===
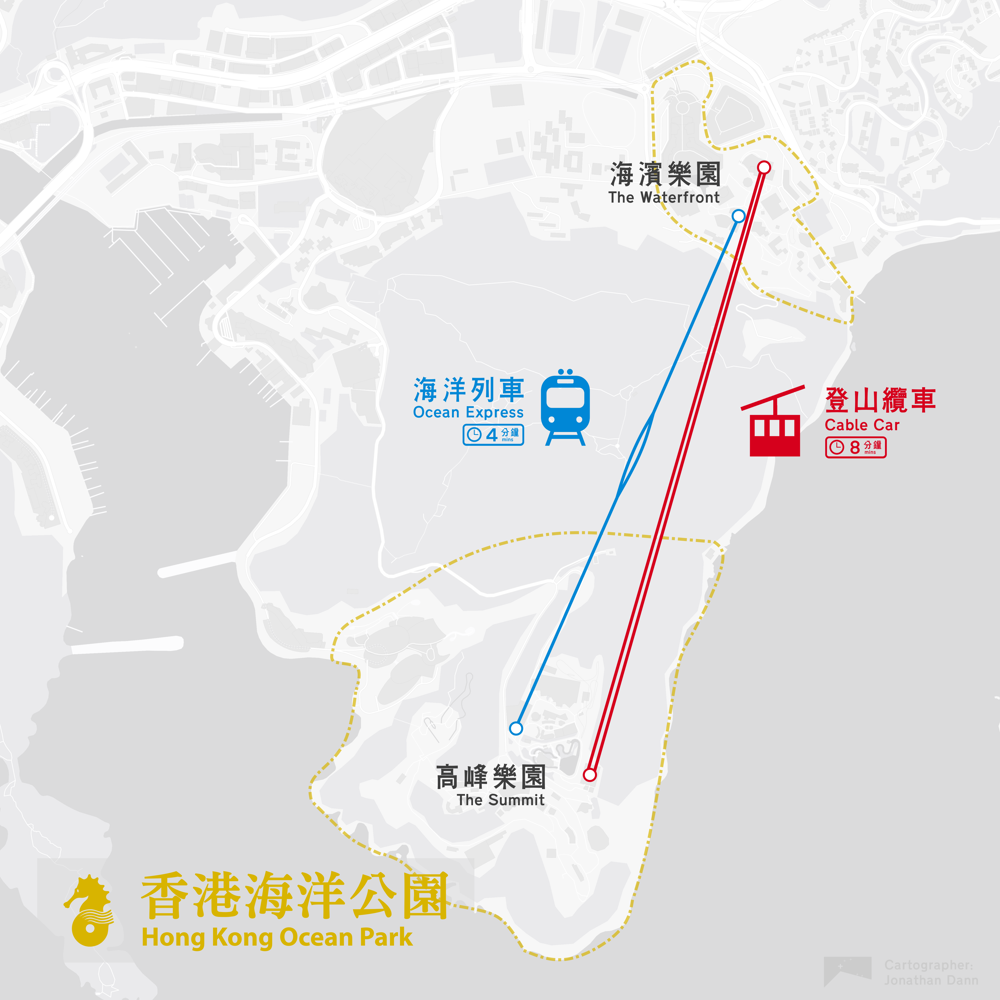
Map of transport

| Name | Type | Opened | Territory | Additional Information |
|---|---|---|---|---|
| Ocean Express | Underground Train | 2009 | Aqua City; Rainforest | An ocean-themed train ride that transports guests to the other side of the park within just 4 minutes. Screens and special effects are in place during the ride. |
| Shuttle Bus | Shuttle Bus | 1977 | Aqua City; Polar Adventure | Only operates if one of the main transportation rides (Cable Car and Ocean Express) is closed. |
| Cable Car | Gondola lift | 1977 | Aqua City (Old Hong Kong); Marine World | One of the park's most iconic attractions. Transports guests between the two tiers of the park (the Waterfront and the Summit). |

== Animals ==
Ocean Park houses 6,515 animals as of 30 June 2023 (most of which being fish), down from the 12,344 animals during the same time in 2014.

The park has had success breeding rare shark species, the Indo-Pacific bottlenose dolphin, sea lions, seahorses, penguins, green anacondas, red-handed tamarins, pygmy marmosets, and several species of sea jellies. Endangered birds and butterflies have also been hatched and reared at Ocean Park.

=== Giant pandas ===
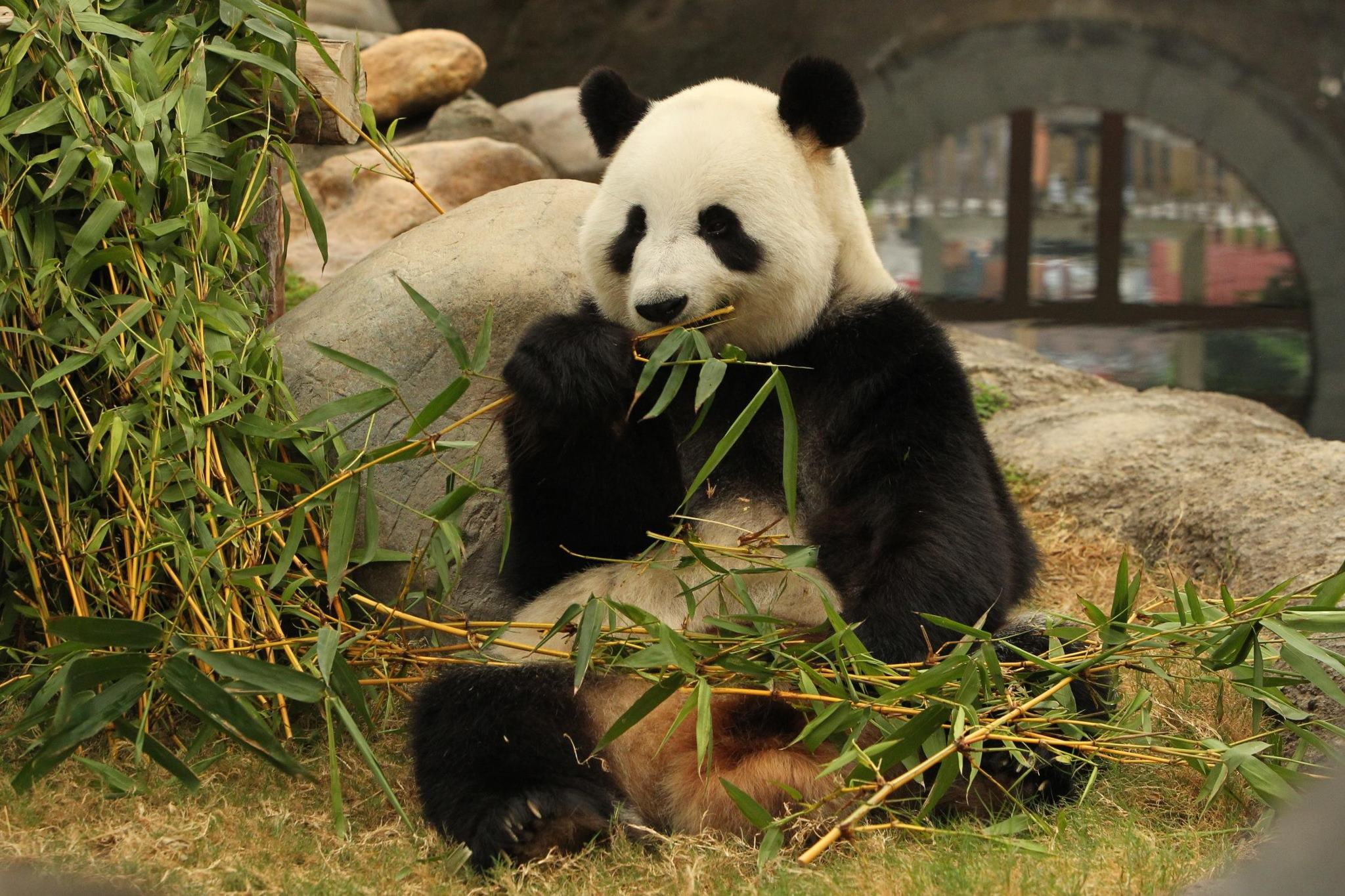
Giant panda Ying Ying at the "Amazing Asian Animals" attraction

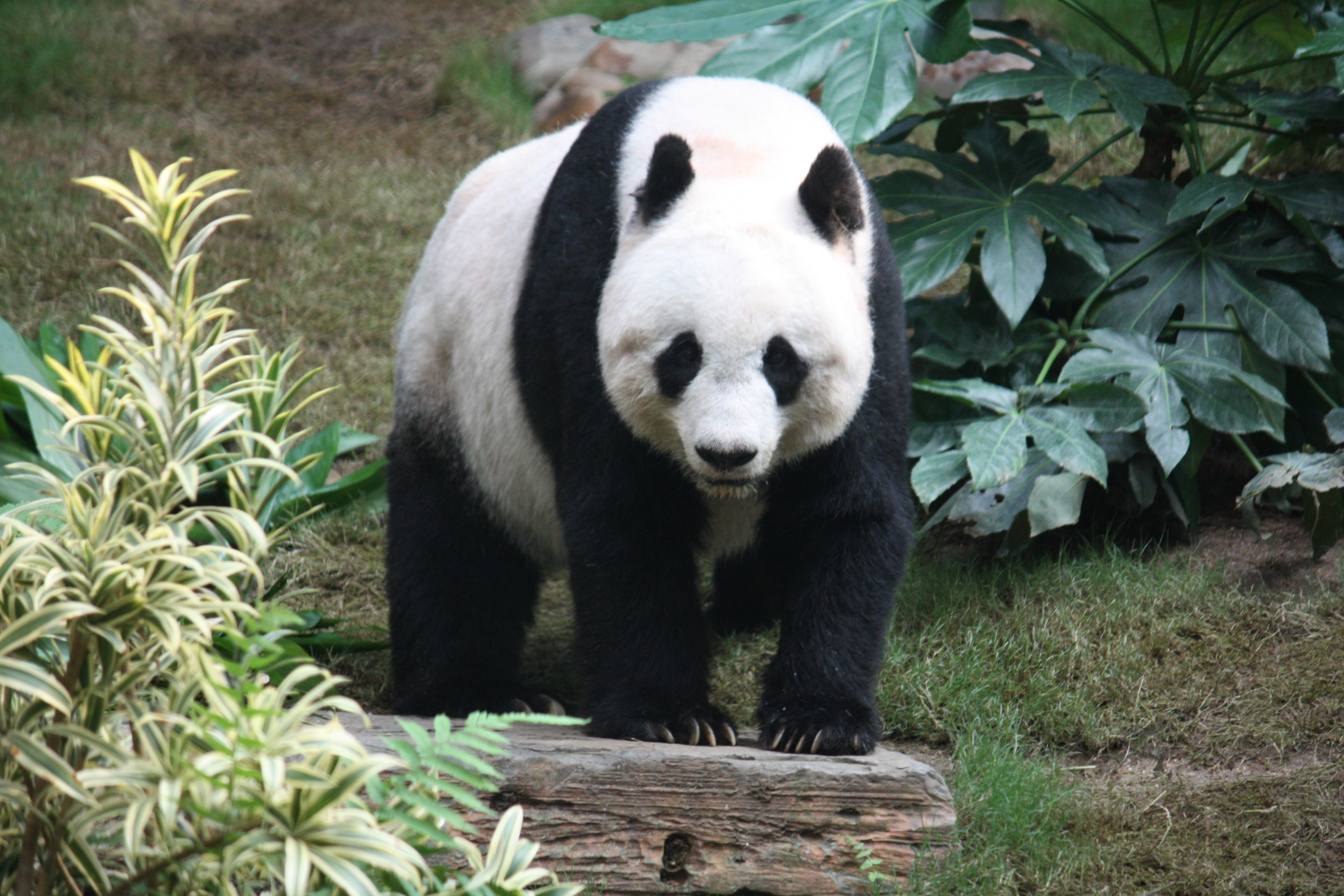
Giant panda at Ocean Park

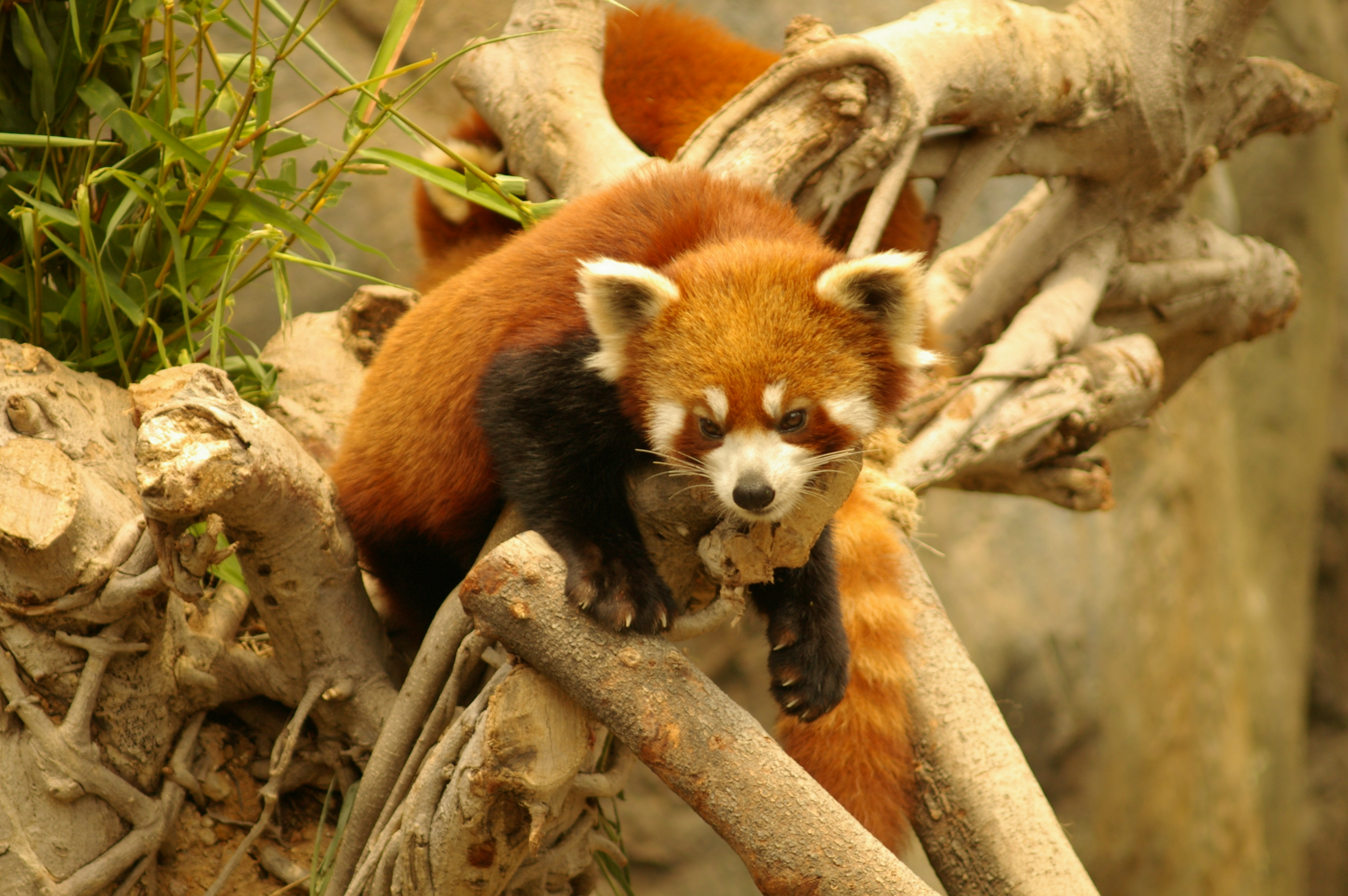
Red panda at Ocean Park

In 1999, a pair of giant pandas, a male named An An (安安) and a female called Jia Jia (佳佳), were given to Ocean Park by China to mark the 2nd anniversary of Hong Kong's 1997 handover from the United Kingdom to China. The pair were given permanent homes in the "Hong Kong Jockey Club Sichuan Treasures" area.

In 2007, two more pandas were given to Hong Kong to mark the 10th anniversary of the city's handover. The pair of two-year-old pandas, a male called Le Le (樂樂) and a female named Ying Ying (盈盈), arrived at Ocean Park from the China Conservation and Research Centre in Wolong, Sichuan province. After quarantine, they made their first public appearance in the "Giant Panda Adventure" area on 1 July 2007. A new compound was prepared at the park to house them on their arrival.

On 28 July 2015, Jia Jia turned 37 years old and was subsequently recognised by the Guinness World Records as the oldest panda currently living in captivity and the oldest panda to ever live in captivity. The previous record was held by a male panda named Du Du, who was kept at Wuhan Zoo in China, and lived to 36 years and 11 months before dying in July 1999.

In October 2016, Jia Jia's health condition began to rapidly deteriorate, exhibiting weight loss and a lack of interest in food and fluids. The panda experienced age-related health deteriorations in previous years, and had high blood pressure, arthritis, and cataracts in both eyes. On 16 October 2016, having been found unable to walk, Jia Jia was euthanised to prevent suffering. She was aged 38 (about 114 years old in human years). The species' average life expectancy is below 20 years in the wild, but can be higher under human care.

On 21 July 2022, An An was euthanised following age-related health deteriorations. At the age of 35 (about 105 years old in human years), he was the world's oldest male giant panda in captivity. The panda had been withdrawn from public viewing two weeks prior due to health problems. He later also began to refuse solid food and became mostly inactive. The decision to euthanise was made by veterinarians from the park and the government's Agriculture, Fisheries and Conservation Department, following consultation with the China Conservation and Research Centre for the Giant Panda.

On 1 July 2024, it was announced that the Chinese government would gift a new pair of giant pandas to Ocean Park in the coming few months, to commemorate the 27th anniversary of Hong Kong's handover. The park first revealed that it was in discussions of requesting two more pandas back in May 2023. The city's pro-Beijing party DAB had previously suggested naming the potential panda pair "Zhizhi" and "Xingxing", meaning 'stability' and 'prosperity' in Chinese respectively, to "symbolise Hong Kong's advance from stability to prosperity".

==== Reproduction efforts ====
In April 2019, Ocean Park considered sending the 13-year-old panda pair Le Le and Ying Ying to the Wolong National Nature Reserve in Sichuan for mating, following poor success with reproduction since their arrival in the park. Panda experts from Sichuan suggested that the panda pair may have poor sexual chemistry, adding that male pandas living in the wild fought each other for the chance to breed with female pandas. The reserve in Wolong is the biggest panda reserve in mainland China and thus offers more potential mates. Ying Ying had previously been sent back there in 2015, where she soon became pregnant but later miscarried. She had three phantom pregnancies in the following years.

In April 2020, the panda pair mated with each other for the first time, at the age of 14. This was considered a breakthrough as male and female giant pandas become sexually mature at seven and five years old respectively. In August 2023, a team of experts from Sichuan arrived at Ocean Park to assist with the park's breeding efforts. The panda pair Jia Jia and An An also did not give birth to any offspring during their lifetime.

On 15 August 2024, Ying Ying gave birth to naturally conceived twins, one female and one male, which were also the first giant pandas to be born in Hong Kong. This made Ying Ying the oldest recorded giant panda to have successfully given birth, at one day before her 19th birthday (equivalent to 57 human years). The pregnancy began when Ying Ying and Le Le naturally mated in March 2024, but was kept secret by the park until after the twins' delivery. The two panda cubs – especially the female – were said by the park to be "very fragile" post-delivery, and needed time to stabilise before introduced to the public.

=== Dolphins ===
In May 2001, Ocean Park became the first in the world to successfully breed dolphins via artificial insemination. See § Artificial insemination.

In July 2009, Domino and Dumisa, two dolphins from Bayworld in Port Elizabeth, South Africa, arrived at Ocean Park. The dolphins, a father and daughter pair, were separated to ensure that they do not mate with each other. They formed part of Ocean Park's breeding programme.

As of January 2024, the park houses 19 Indo-Pacific bottlenose dolphins, following the death of its oldest male, Molly, at the age of 40.

==== Orcas – Hoi Wai and Prince ====
Hoi Wai was a female orca that resided in Ocean Park between 1979 and 1997. Following her capture near Iceland in 1977, she was first kept at other theme parks, including the Dolfinarium Harderwijk in the Netherlands and the now-defunct Windsor Safari Park in Berkshire, England. Hoi Wai arrived in Hong Kong on 28 January 1979, at the age of four, following a 16-hour flight from the UK. Earlier that month, she had been kept at Clacton Pier in Clacton-on-Sea, England, but her tank was suddenly cracked by heavy waves on 1 January. She was immediately scrambled to safety by an Ocean Park supervisor that had been there to prepare for the transfer, and who requisitioned an open truck to transport her to another marine park over an eight-hour journey.

The orca was initially named "Suzy Wong" while at Windsor Safari Park, in reference to the Hong Kong love story The World of Suzie Wong written by British author Richard Mason. This name was met with opposition back in Hong Kong, so local television station TVB launched a public naming competition that resulted in the orca being renamed Hoi-wei (Chinese: 海威, later written Hoi Wai, lit. 'mighty of the ocean').

At Ocean Park, Hoi Wai was regarded as a star attraction and engaged in shows, where she performed ball-balancing tricks and dramatic leaps and dives. She enjoyed celebrity-like fame and made appearances on television shows and in movies. On 13 April 1989, she was joined by a male orca named Prince, who was also captured near Iceland, and had previously been held at Kamogawa Sea World in Japan. Prince died only three years later on 10 July 1991 of gastroenteritis and pneumonia, measuring 5 m (16 ft) in length. They produced no offspring. Hoi Wai died several years later on 21 April 1997, three days after she suddenly began to suffer from diarrhoea and bleeding, with later tests revealing it to be due to an infected wound in her intestines. She was 22 years old, weighed 1,700–1,800 kg (3,700–4,000 lb), and measured 5 m (16 ft) in length.

Ocean Park had initially planned to acquire a beluga whale or another orca as its new star attraction, as it then relied on marine life as its main appeal. However, this idea was ultimately struck down due to controversy over using captive animals in performance shows. As a result, the death of Hoi Wai also marked a change in the park's business model, as it transitioned to rely more heavily on funfair-style rides as attractions. The park last considered acquiring orcas in 2004.

Some travel websites and social media posts incorrectly state that Hoi Wai's remains are preserved in the Cape D'Aguilar Marine Reserve in Shek O, where a whale skeleton is displayed and which is home to the Swire Institute of Marine Science (Swims) of the University of Hong Kong. Experts have debunked this claim, pointing that the skeleton is too long for an orca, and that Ocean Park likely cremated Hoi Wai's carcass in line with their usual procedures. According to Swims, the skeleton in fact belongs to a juvenile male fin whale that was found in April 1955 to be lethargic, slowly starving, and floating in Victoria Harbour. The whale was euthanised by marine police via a gunshot to its head, an outcome considered by Swims to be "the most humane". Its skeleton was preserved by Swims as a symbol of marine conservation.

=== Chinese sturgeons ===
In 2008, to mark China's hosting of the Summer Olympics, Ocean Park was gifted five rare Chinese sturgeons (symbolising the five Olympic rings) by the Chinese government. The Chinese sturgeon is rarer than the giant panda, and is considered a national treasure of China. Two of the sturgeons were bred by the Yangtze River Fisheries Research Institute and three by the Beijing Aquarium.

The five sturgeons made their public debut on 20 June 2008. However, one of them died four days later, after being bitten by a barracuda. On 14 July 2008, it was announced that Hong Kong would receive another five sturgeons from the Chinese National Aquatic Wildlife Conservation Association in time for the Olympics opening ceremony on 8 August, (Note: According to Wei Qiwei, a researcher at the Yangtze River Fisheries Research Institute, five sturgeons were sent instead of one as the new fish lived in freshwater, unlike those already in Ocean Park, which lived in saltwater. It would have taken weeks before the new sturgeon(s) could adapt to saltwater to live with the original ones, so the two groups could not have been displayed together in time for the Olympic Games' opening ceremony.) to complement the four fish already in site. The park's management opted to house the new arrivals in its existing shark aquarium, thus removing its sharks from public viewing. A second sturgeon died from an infection on 12 December. A third one died from an injury and two more were found to be ill in January 2009. The two sick fish were returned to the Yangtze River Fisheries Research Institute for expert care.

In December 2019, Ocean Park returned to mainland China the last batch of six Chinese sturgeons.

=== Animal encounter programmes ===
Ocean Park runs a series of programmes called "Get Closer to the Animals" which offer supervised access to its resident animals, from swimming with dolphins to learning to be a panda keeper. Holders of a diving certificate can even enter the Grand Aquarium, while an overnight camp within its dome offers a drier way to view the underwater world. There are behind-the-scenes tours of many facilities, often including the chance to get close to animals such as penguins, seals and other polar animals.

=== Animal mascots ===
Ocean Park introduced a waving sailor sea lion named Whiskers (known as Wai Wai in Chinese) as its major mascot in 2000. Subsequent members of the Ocean Park 'family' include James Fin (a shark), Jewel (a butterfly/fairy), Swift (a dolphin), Chief (a parrot), Professor (a turtle), Later Gator (a Chinese alligator), Redd (a red panda), Goldie (a goldfish), Tux (a rockhopper penguin), and four giant pandas: An An, Jia Jia, Le Le and Ying Ying.

In 2015, the older mascots were replaced by a newer set of mascots known collectively as "Whiskers & Friends". The mascots are now depicted in a more simplistic style. Some of the older mascots such as Whiskers and Redd remain mostly unchanged. However, brand new mascots (which are mostly rebooted designs of older animal mascots) are introduced as well. These new mascots include Fluffi (an Arctic fox), Mark (a shark), Justin (a dolphin), Dougie (a rockhopper penguin) and Bao Bao (a giant panda). Though the older mascots are no longer acknowledged by the park itself, traces of them can still be spotted on numerous rides, attractions and objects around the park, with a few notable examples being the Arctic Blast roller coaster, the Flying Swing and the waste containers in Marine World.

== Research and conservation ==
Ocean Park conducts education and research into animal conservation, including through the Ocean Park Conservation Foundation, Hong Kong (OPCFHK), a fund that advocates, facilitates and participates in the conservation of wildlife and habitats, with an emphasis on Asia, through research and education. After the 2008 earthquake in Sichuan, OPCFHK established a Giant Panda Base Rebuilding Fund and donated equipment to the affected nature reserves.

Ocean Park has created education programmes, such as the Ocean Park Academy (OPA), begun in 2004, through which the Park runs educational tours for schoolchildren and workshops for teachers from the Hong Kong Institute of Education. Every year, the Park offers over 35 core courses for around 46,000 students on six big topics: giant pandas and red pandas, dolphins and sea lions, birds, fishes, plants, and mechanical rides.

=== Animal rescue and shelter ===
Ocean Park works with the Hong Kong government's Agriculture, Fisheries and Conservation Department (AFCD) in animal conservation. The park provides shelter for fish, sea turtles, coral reefs, and other illegally imported or abandoned wild animals that were rescued or confiscated by the AFCD. From January 2000 to April 2023, the park returned more than 70 rescued sea turtles to the ocean after providing them with medical treatment. Through its Conservation Foundation, the park also handled and analysed more than 600 cetacean stranding cases with the AFCD from January 2006 to April 2023.

In 2013, Ocean Park adopted two Arctic foxes that had earlier been confiscated by the AFCD. The foxes were originally from mainland China and were added to the park's existing Arctic Fox Den. In August 2014, one of these two foxes, a female named Mochi, gave birth to a litter of six pups, including four females and two males. These were the first Arctic foxes to be born in Hong Kong.

In April 2018, Ocean Park adopted two Asian small-clawed otters that had been discovered in a smuggling case earlier in January. The park named the otters "Si" (時) and "Fun" (分), meaning 'hour' and 'minute' in Cantonese respectively. Fun later became pregnant, and the pair became parents to quadruplets in August. The offspring, three female and one male, were also given names associated with time – "Miu" (秒, 'second'), "Centi" (short for centisecond), "Milli" (short for millisecond), and "Mei" (微, 'micro', short for microsecond). As of May 2023, the pair has given birth to a total of 12 offspring and are a popular attraction at the park.

In April 2023, Ocean Park adopted a rare crocodile that had earlier been discovered by residents in Yuen Long. The female crocodile, then measuring 1.9 m (6.2 ft) in length and weighing 35 kg (77 lb), was likely illegally imported and kept as a pet nearby before ultimately escaping or being abandoned. It was later confirmed by DNA testing to be a hybrid of the Siamese crocodile and Cuban crocodile, and was estimated to be four to five years old in March 2024. Following an online poll featuring names suggested by the public, the crocodile was named "Passion" in English, short for passion fruit, whose Cantonese name (百香果) is pronounced like Pat Heung (八鄉), the area where it was found. The crocodile was also made an animal ambassador of the park. Since 16 March 2024, it has been exhibited in a purpose-built habitat named "Croco Land". The attraction is located at the park's entrance and does not require an admission ticket to view, a decision meant to "highlight the [p]ark's dedication to conservation education".

=== Artificial insemination ===
==== Bottlenose dolphin ====
In May 2001, Ocean Park became the first in the world to successfully breed dolphins via artificial insemination, following a 12-year research project. Two calves, one male and one female, were delivered nine days apart by two pregnant bottlenose dolphins, 22-year-old Ada and 20-year-old Gina. The park originally inseminated four females in May 2000 using sperm from a 17-year-old male dolphin named Molly; two of them were ultimately successfully inseminated, also in a world's first feat.

Artificial insemination of dolphins is exceptionally difficult due to their highly unpredictable fertility cycles, with past attempts in the United States having failed. Ocean Park's success was made possible by new ultrasound scanning techniques, which ensured ideal insemination by allowing real-time monitoring of whether a dolphin was about to ovulate, with close to 100% accuracy.

According to Suzanne Gendron, the head of Ocean Park's zoological operations and education department, this breakthrough opened up the opportunity to carry out an in-vitro fertilisation programme on an international scale. This would reduce the need for aquariums to capture animals in the wild for breeding, which is done to maintain genetic diversity and avoid inbreeding among captive animals, which could create health problems. Inbreeding among dolphins in captivity is especially problematic as it quickly results in genetically weaker offspring. The park had previously been developing a sperm bank for dolphins.

The technique could also be used to help preserve endangered dolphin species. According to Gendron, it could be used on the rare Indo-Pacific humpback dolphin (often referred to as the Chinese white dolphin), though there was not yet a need as the population was still large enough to support natural breeding. There were about 1,000 Indo-Pacific humpback dolphins in southern Chinese waters near the Pearl River Delta in 2001.

==== Javanese cownose ray ====
On 23 April 2023, Ocean Park became the first in the world to successfully breed the Javanese cownose ray (Rhinoptera javanica) via artificial insemination. The species is considered endangered according to the IUCN Red List. According to a senior veterinarian at the park, artificial reproduction techniques were considered as the park's cownose rays had poor success with reproduction and were sometimes born dead.

The project began in late 2021 when the park selected three non-pregnant female rays, which were then housed together in the absence of males. The female rays were eventually inseminated in February 2022 using semen from two male rays. The semen was first diluted with a special solution and then preserved at −4 °C (25 °F). As the rays' blood test results could be distorted from stress, the team involved had trained its rays to voluntarily accept ultrasound check-up scans instead of relying on sedation; the senior vet revealed that the park's staff used to chase its rays with nets 15 years prior. One female ray was born following 61 weeks of gestation, longer than the 47–53 weeks typical of its species. The birth was later confirmed to have resulted from the artificial insemination and not from parthoenogensis.

Named "April" after her birth month, the female ray turned eight months old in December 2023, and is publicly exhibited with a male ray in the park's shark and ray pool. The park intends on extending the breeding program to other elasmobranchs.

=== Criticism ===
Ocean Park has been criticised by wildlife advocates for certain practices including the wild capture of large sea animals, such as dolphins and orca, and the presentation of shows featuring such animals performing. Opponents have highlighted their views on international "Empty the Tanks" day – a non-violent multinational demonstration that aims to end the capture and sale of wild dolphins to marine parks, where the creatures are said to die younger and breed much less. There is concern for the psychological state of the mammals alongside their physiological needs. And the advocates say it sends the wrong message, not only to visitors but also to marine parks in mainland China, which, if they copied the Park's practices, could have a significant impact on wild populations.

== Major annual events ==
Ocean Park hosts six major events throughout the year: an Kidsfest, Animal in High Definition Month, the Ocean Park Summer Splash, the Halloween Bash and Christmas and Chinese New Year celebrations.

=== Halloween Fest (Mid-September to Late October) ===
Since 2008, the Park has held a popular annual Halloween Bash through the month of October. Themes such as "Fear Formula" and "Haunted Hong Kong" provide modern twists on the traditional halloween rituals, including various attractions and activities.

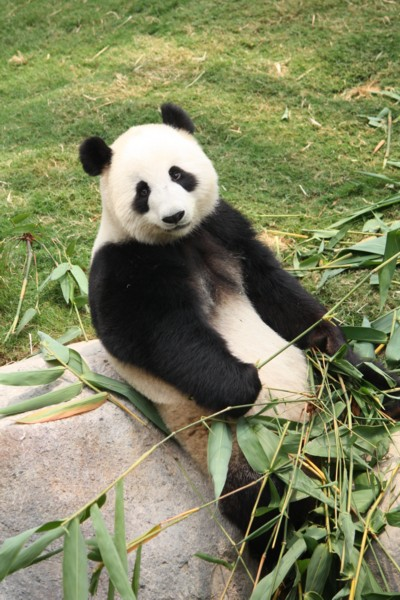
Giant panda at Ocean Park

=== Ocean Park Summer Splash (July–August) ===
The event is held each summer, with visitors partaking in various wet and wild thrills, including water games and water slides.

=== Christmas Sensation (December) ===
Christmas themed celebrations held from December to January every year.

=== Chinese New Year Fiesta (January/February) ===
Chinese New Year celebration events are held around January to February every year. The celebration usually features lantern displays, God of Fortune visits, lion and dragon dances. In 2013, the CNY Fiesta featured a 12-metre spinning lantern, as well as a traditional Chinese drum show.

=== Animal in High Definition Month (discontinued) ===
The Animal in High Definition Months enable visitors to encounter a variety of rare animals up close, with educational experts on hand to disseminate information about these creatures. The Animal in High Definition Month for 2010 had a reptile theme called, "Mighty Dragons". In 2012, the event let visitors explore Chinese national treasures, featuring the display of two Sichuan golden monkeys.

== Attendance ==
| Worldwide rank | Year | Number of visitors | Net change | % Change | New Attractions |
|---|---|---|---|---|---|
| 30 | 2002 | 3,400,000 | +442,000 | +13 | |
| 32 | 2003 | 2,900,000 | −500,000 | −17.2 | |
| 35 | 2004 | 3,700,000 | +800,000 | +27.6 | |
| 31 | 2005 | 4,030,000 | +330,000 | +8.9 | Sea Jelly Spectacular |
| 22 | 2006 | 4,380,000 | +350,000 | +8.7 | SkyFair Plaza |
| 16 | 2007 | 4,920,000 | +540,000 | +12.3 | Giant Panda Habitat (Rethemed) |
| 15 | 2008 | 5,030,000 | +110,000 | +2.2 | Amazing Asian Animals |
| 14 | 2009 | 4,800,000 | −230,000 | −4.6 | Ocean Express, Sea Life Carousel, Chinese Sturgeon Aquarium |
| 17 | 2010 | 5,404,000 | +604,000 | +12.6 | Aqua City, The Rainforest, The Flash |
| 11 | 2011 | 6,955,000 | +1,551,000 | +28.7 | Thrill Mountain, Polar Mountain, Old Hong Kong |
| 14 | 2012 | 7,436,000 | +481,000 | +6.9 | |
| 12 | 2013 | 7,475,000 | +39,000 | +0.5 | Shark Mystique |
| 13 | 2014 | 7,792,000 | +317,000 | +4.2 | Adventures in Australia |
| 15 | 2015 | 7,387,000 | −405,000 | −5.2 | |
| 18 | 2016 | 5,996,000 | −1,391,000 | −18.8 | |
| 20 | 2017 | 5,800,000 | −196,000 | −3.3 | VR Mine Train |
| 17 | 2018 | 5,800,000 | 0 | 0 | Hong Kong Ocean Park Marriott Hotel |
| 12 | 2019 | 5,700,000 | −100,000 | −7 | Wild Twister, The Abyss VR Space Voyage, |
| 9 | 2020 | 2,200,000 | −3,500,000 | −61.4 | Gala of Lights, Little Meerkat and Giant Tortoise Adventure |
| N/A | 2021 | 1,400,000 | −800,000 | −36.4 | Explorer R, Water World Ocean Park Hong Kong |
| N/A | 2022 | 1,400,000 (Ocean Park) 200,000 (Water World) 1,600,000 (total) | +200,000 | +14.3 | The Fullerton Ocean Park Hotel Hong Kong |
| N/A | 2023 | 2,100,000 (Ocean Park) 300,000 (Water World) 2,400,000 (total) | +800,000 | +57.1 | Sloth and Friends Studio |

== Incidents ==
- On 5 December 2010, seven were injured on the park's Ocean Express railway when a train driver mistakenly triggered the emergency braking system. This abruptly stopped both trains of the system, which carried 107 passengers total at the time. A 70-year-old man suffered facial injuries and was in critical condition. Each train carries up to 250 passengers and has 40 seats, which are not equipped with seat belts. This was the first incident involving the Ocean Express since its opening in September 2009. The Ocean Express was reopened on 16 December 2010, with flip covers installed over the brake switches and a 30% reduction in maximum speed, among other safety measures.
- On 10 April 2014, a 50-year-old man on holiday from Hubei, China, fell to his death after sitting on a railing. He lost balance and fell 11 m (36 ft) down from the Summit area.
- On 5 September 2016, a 3-year-old boy lost a toe after his left foot was trapped in the park's 220-metre (720 ft) escalator. The boy's pregnant mother was forced to drag him out after failing to stop the escalator, which was not equipped with emergency shut-off buttons or sensors in the middle as required (Note: The escalator system was constructed in 1984 and complied with safety regulations at the time, which did not require a specific number of motion sensors. The escalator subsequently only had two motion sensors installed at the top and bottom. In 2012, the safety regulations were revised such that the number of sensors installed had to be proportional to the escalator's length. However, operators were not required to upgrade existing escalators to comply with this latest standard, which otherwise would've required at least 75 sensors on each side of Ocean Park's escalator system.) by safety regulations updated in 2012. The boy was sent to Ruttonjee Hospital 49 minutes later and received treatment after another 30 minutes. He underwent four surgeries, which amputated one of his toes and artificially rejointed two other ones, and will require further surgery as he grows. The boy's family complained that the park's staff were slow to react to the incident, with one employee insisting that the boy be first assessed in a first-aid station located 500 m (1,600 ft) away, instead of calling emergency services immediately. Ocean Park offered HK$100,000 to the family, who claimed it was settlement as part of a confidentiality agreement. The family rejected the offer, seeking an investigation, a formal apology, and more compensation. The park denied that it had attempted to stop the family from disclosing the accident, saying that the money was emergency payment offered on an ex gratia basis (out of compassion and kindness, and without an admission of responsibility).
- On 16 September 2017, a 21-year-old man died inside the park's Halloween attraction, "Buried Alive", where guests lie in a coffin until the bottom drops out, sending them down a slide. The man had accidentally entered a staff-only area, and was hit on the head by the coffin bottom. The man was sent to Ruttonjee Hospital and certified dead. Legislators and industry experts questioned why the dangerous restricted area was not locked and marked clearly with warning signage.
- On 30 March 2021, 14 passengers on board the Wild Twister were left stranded mid-air for at least six minutes after it malfunctioned. All riders safely evacuated.
- On 24 May 2025, the observation tower was suspended after its safety protection system activated due to a signal failure. Ride operators assisted all 17 passengers in exiting after an hour.
- On 10 August 2025, 17 passengers on board the Wild Twister were left stranded mid-air for over an hour due to a signal failure. All riders were rescued safely.

== Access ==
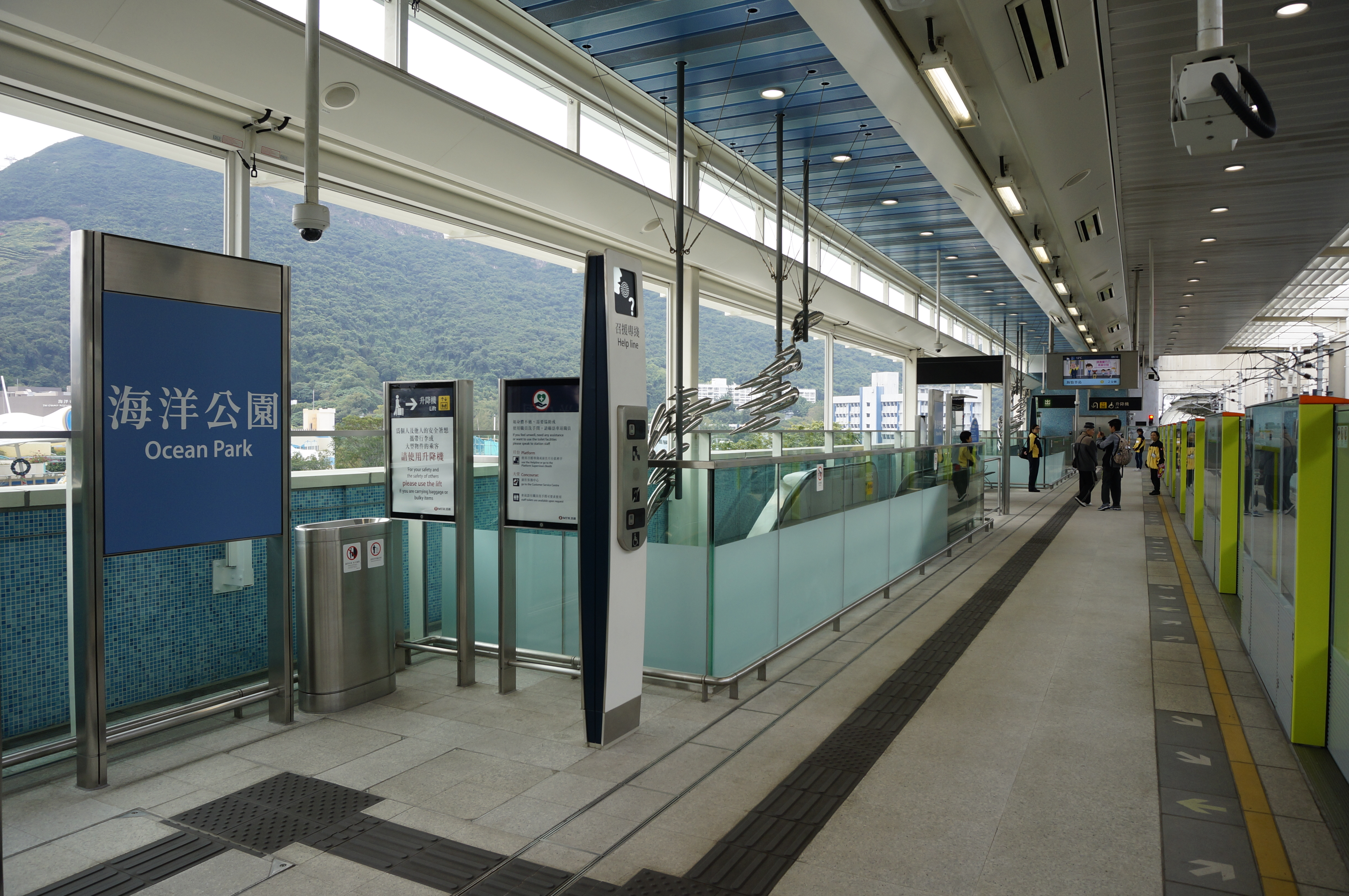
Train platform at Ocean Park station

=== Mass Transit Railway ===
Ocean Park station on the South Island line is located adjacent the main entrance of the park. The station opened on 28 December 2016 and connects Ocean Park directly to Hong Kong's MTR system, from Admiralty station.

=== Bus ===
The Citybus Ocean Park Express (Route 629)‍ used to provide departures from Central Piers to Ocean Park only. This route has since stopped its regular service due to a decline in passenger numbers.

Passengers may use any of the Aberdeen Tunnel bus routes and walk to the park from the Aberdeen Tunnel Toll Plaza bus stop.

=== Car ===
The venue is also accessible by taxi, private hire car or personal car. The park provides some car park spaces close to the main entrance, however, the car park can be busy during peak times. Road access is via Route 1 (Aberdeen Tunnel) from central and eastern districts of Hong Kong Island, Kowloon, New Territories or Pok Fu Lam Road from western districts.

== See also ==
- Amusement parks in Hong Kong
- Allan Zeman, Chairman of Ocean Park from July 2003 to June 2014
- Tourism in Hong Kong
- Hong Kong Zoological and Botanical Gardens
- Kadoorie Farm and Botanic Garden
