= Tom Mehrmann =

Amusement park general manager

Thomas Mehrmann (Chinese: 苗樂文) is the current general manager of Universal Studios Beijing.

== Ocean Park ==
Mehrmann was formerly Chief Executive Officer at Ocean Park, Hong Kong for 12 years. He joined Ocean Park, Hong Kong as its CEO in February 2004, when he was recommended by then new chairman Allan Zeman immediately after being interviewed. Under Mehrmann's leadership, Ocean Park won the Applause Award in 2012. The biggest scheme under his helm was the HK$5.55 billion Master Redevelopment Plan which he started working on right after he took up the job. Endorsed by the government in October 2005 and completed in 2012, it added facilities including the "Ocean Express" connecting the Summit and Waterfront, and the Aqua City aquarium. Mehrmann was awarded the Bronze Bauhinia Star in 2016.

== Author ==
Tom Mehrmann authored the book, Taming the Mouse: How a Small Hong Kong Theme Park Came to Dominate Disney. It was published by Switow Media in November 2018.
