= Nam Long Shan =

Hill in Aberdeen, Hong Kong

- 南朗山
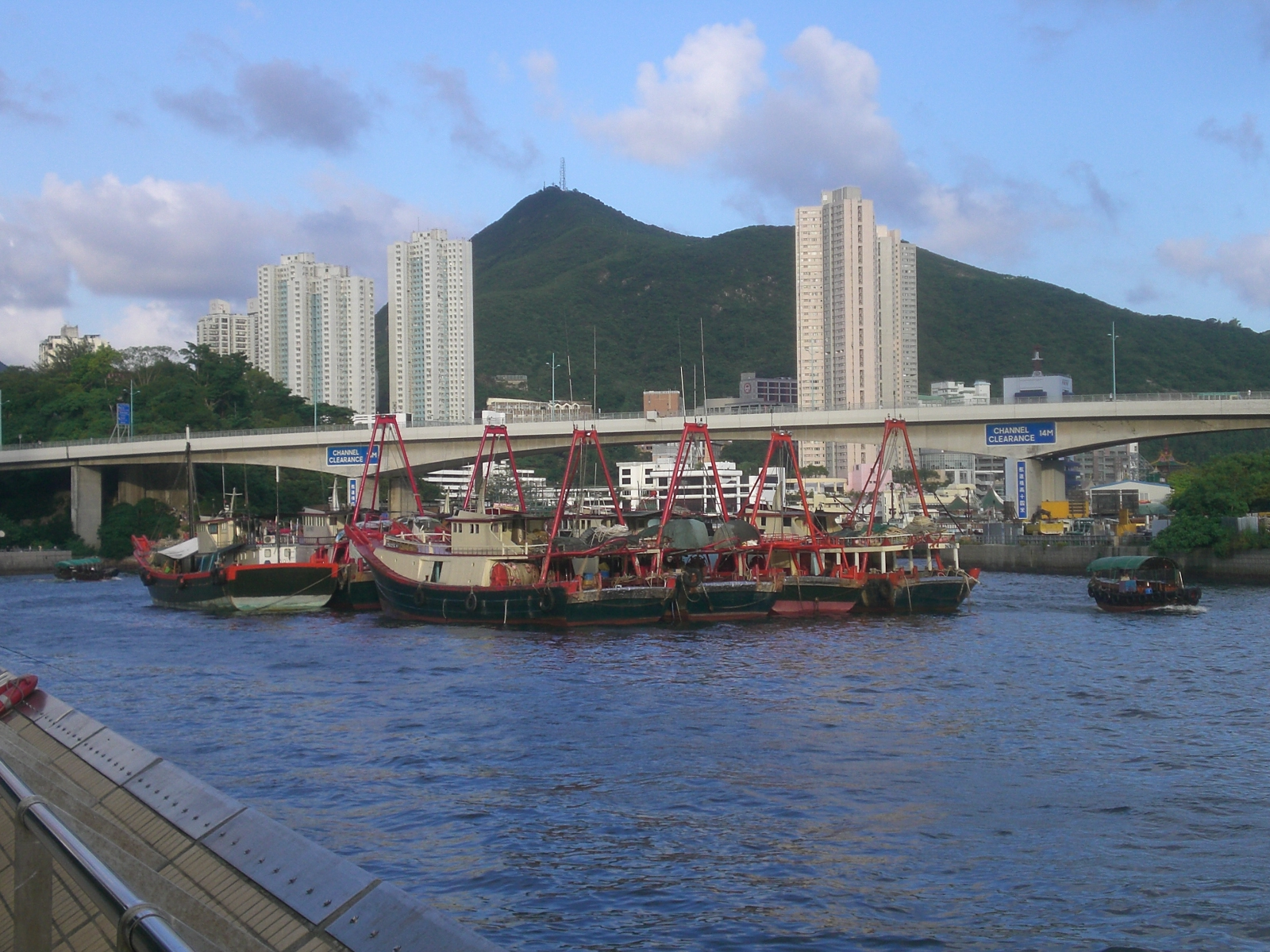
- Nam Long Shan viewed from Aberdeen Promenade

Highest point
- Elevation: 282 m (925 ft)
- Coordinates: 22.24313°N 114.16878°E

Geography
- Location within Hong Kong
- Location: Hong Kong

Nam Long Shan (Chinese: 南朗山) or Brick Hill is a hill on the Hong Kong Island of Hong Kong, near Wong Chuk Hang and Aberdeen. At an elevation of 282 metres, it overlooks the South China Sea in the south, Sham Wan and Aberdeen Channel in the west, and Deep Water Bay in the east.

== Features ==
The summit of Ocean Park is on the southern slopes of Nam Long Shan, with a cable car system connecting through the eastern slopes to The Waterfront in Wong Chuk Hang.

Singapore International School, Canadian International School of Hong Kong, Victoria Shanghai Academy, Good Shepherd Sisters Marycove Centre, Hong Kong Juvenile Care Centre Chan Nam Cheong Memorial School, Nam Long Hospital and David Trench Home for the Aged are on the western slope of the Nam Long Shan.

== See also ==
- List of mountains, peaks and hills in Hong Kong
- List of places in Hong Kong
- Aberdeen, Hong Kong
