= Ocean Park Conservation Foundation Hong Kong =

Hong Kong charity

Ocean Park Conservation Foundation, Hong Kong
- 香港海洋公園保育基金
- Established: 1 July 2005; 21 years ago (following the merging of the former Ocean Park Conservation Foundation (OPCF) and the Hong Kong Society for Panda Conservation (HKSPC))
- Type: Registered charitable non-governmental organisation
- Headquarters: Hong Kong
- Leader: Ms Judy Chen
- Website: opcf.org.hk

Ocean Park Conservation Foundation Hong Kong
- Traditional Chinese: 香港海洋公園保育基金
- Simplified Chinese: 香港海洋公园保护基金
Transcriptions
Standard Mandarin
- Hanyu Pinyin: Xiānggǎng Hǎiyáng Gōngyuán Bǎoyù Jījīn
Yue: Cantonese
- Jyutping: hoeng1 gong2 hoi2 joeng4 gung1 jyun4*2 bou2 juk6 gei1 gam1

Hong Kong Society for Panda Conservation
- Traditional Chinese: 香港熊貓保育協會
- Simplified Chinese: 香港熊猫保育协会
Transcriptions
Standard Mandarin
- Hanyu Pinyin: Xiānggǎng Xióngmāo Bǎoyù Xiéhuì
Yue: Cantonese
- Jyutping: hoeng1 gong2 hung4 maau1 bou2 juk6 hip3 wui6*2

Ocean Park Conservation Foundation
- Traditional Chinese: 海洋公園鯨豚保護基金
- Simplified Chinese: 海洋公园鲸豚保护基金
Transcriptions
Standard Mandarin
- Hanyu Pinyin: Hǎiyáng Gōngyuán Jīngtún Bǎohù Jījīn
Yue: Cantonese
- Jyutping: hoi2 joeng4 gung1 jyun4*2 king4 tyun4 bou2 wu6 gei1 gam1

The Ocean Park Conservation Foundation, Hong Kong (Chinese: 香港海洋公園保育基金), commonly referred to by its initialism OPCFHK, is a registered charitable non-governmental organisation under the Ocean Park Corporation. It was established on 1 July 2005, following the merger of the former Ocean Park Conservation Foundation (OPCF) and the Hong Kong Society for Panda Conservation (HKSPC).

== Allocation of funds ==
In 2005–2007, OPCFHK donated 10 percent of its scientific research funding to study the impact of the South Asian tsunami disaster on the marine environment and to help rebuild damaged corals.

== See also ==
- Hulu Concept
