= Hair Raiser =

Floorless roller coaster in Hong Kong

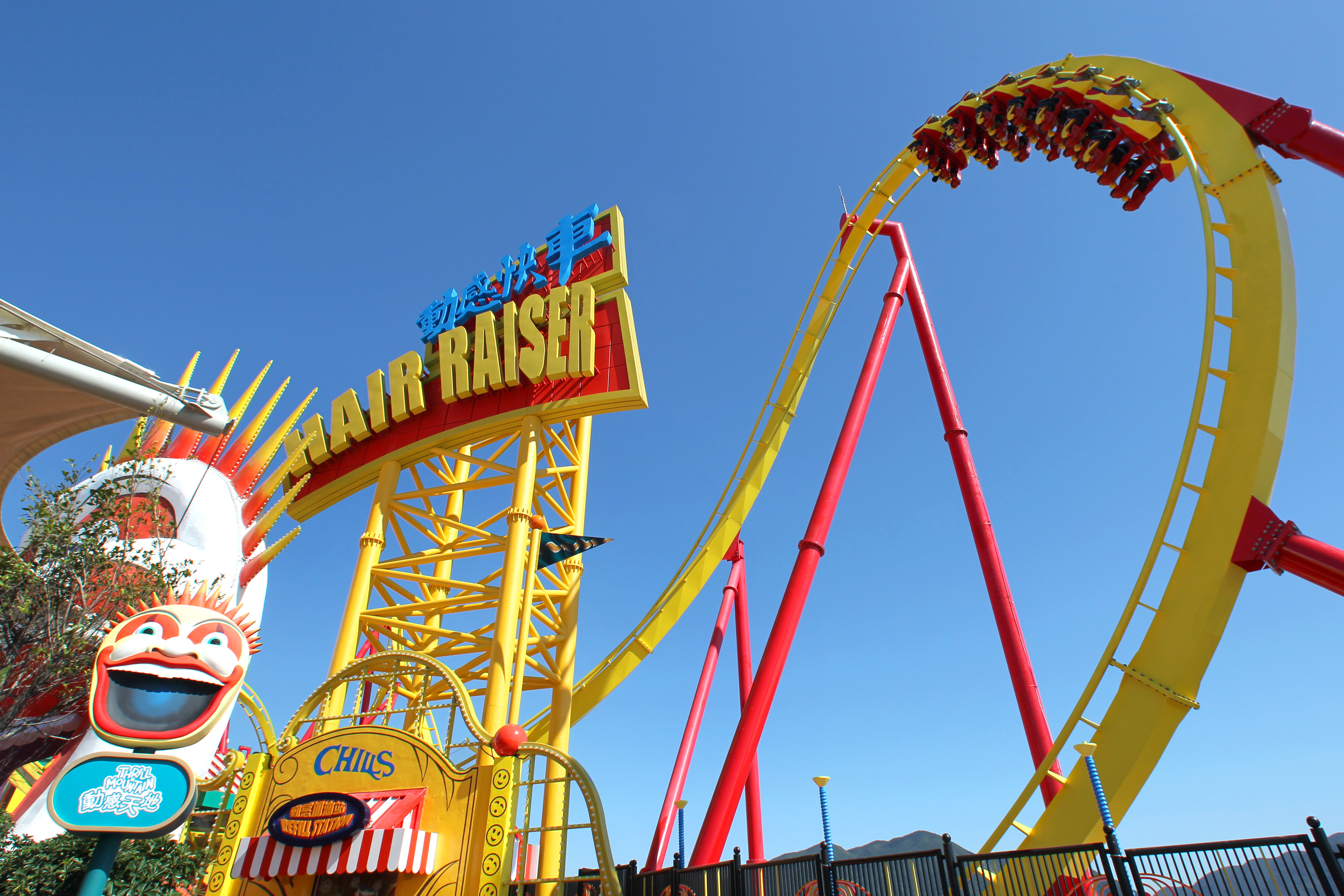

Ocean Park Hong Kong
- Location: Ocean Park Hong Kong
- Park section: Thrill Mountain
- Coordinates: 22.235692°N 114.172475°E
- Status: Operating
- Opening date: 8 December 2011

General statistics
- Type: Steel – Floorless Coaster
- Manufacturer: Bolliger & Mabillard
- Model: Floorless Coaster
- Track layout: Twister
- Lift/launch system: 1 Chain lift hill
- Height: 114.8 ft (35.0 m)
- Length: 2,788.8 ft (850.0 m)
- Speed: 88 km/h (55 mph)
- Inversions: 4
- Duration: 60 seconds
- G-force: 4
- Height restriction: 140 cm (4 ft 7 in)
- Trains: Unknown number of trains with 7 cars; riders arranged 4 across in a single row for a total of 28 riders per train
- Hair Raiser at RCDB

Hair Raiser (Chinese: 動感快車) is a steel floorless roller coaster at Ocean Park Hong Kong in Hong Kong Island, Hong Kong. Manufactured by Bolliger & Mabillard, the coaster opened on 8 December 2011, and is the twelfth floorless coaster to be built. The large smiling face entrance is loosely based on Luna Park Sydney in Australia.

== Experience ==
After riders have boarded, the restraints are secure and the train is dispatched, the train takes about a half turn to the left before beginning to the climb the chain lift hill. As the train reaches the top of the lift hill, the train goes through a pre-drop before making a sharp turn to the left towards the first drop. When the train reaches the bottom of the drop, it goes through a vertical loop followed by a slight turn to the left afterwards goes through the second out of four elements, a dive loop. After, the trains goes over a small airtime/bunny hill and goes through the zero-g roll. Immediately after, the train approaches the final inversion of the coaster, an immelmann loop. The train then enters a twisted airtime followed by another right turn before hitting the final brake run. After passing the brake run, the train makes a right turn going through another set of brakes before entering the station.

== See also ==
- 2011 in amusement parks
