= List of Purdue University alumni =

Here follows a list of notable alumni of Purdue University.

== Notable alumni ==
=== Academia ===
==== College chancellors, presidents and vice-presidents ====
- Robert Altenkirch – former president of the New Jersey Institute of Technology and University of Alabama in Huntsville
- Rebecca Ehretsman – eighteenth president of Wartburg College
- Hank Foley – current president of the New York Institute of Technology
- Tony Frank – president, Colorado State University
- Domenico Grasso – chancellor, University of Michigan-Dearborn
- Richard J. Grosh – former president of Rensselaer Polytechnic Institute
- Arthur G. Hansen – former president of the Georgia Institute of Technology and Purdue University
- Edwin D. Harrison – former president of the Georgia Institute of Technology
- Renu Khator – chancellor of the University of Houston System and president of the University of Houston
- Dorothy Leland – president, Georgia College & State University
- Duane Litfin – president, Wheaton College
- Sally Mason – president of the University of Iowa, former provost of Purdue University
- Hanna Nasser – former president of Birzeit University, political figure
- Sunder Ramaswamy – president of the Monterey Institute of International Studies
- Kenneth "Buzz" Shaw – chancellor of Syracuse University
- Gary Allan Sojka – president of Bucknell University
- Hugo F. Sonnenschein – economist and educational administrator, president of the University of Chicago
- James J. Stukel – former president of the University of Illinois
- Blake Ragsdale Van Leer – former president of the Georgia Institute of Technology
- Larry N. Vanderhoef – chancellor of the University of California, Davis
- Brent W. Webb – academic vice president of Brigham Young University
- John T. Wolfe Jr. – former president of Savannah State University

==== Deans ====
- Srinivas Aravamudan – dean of the Humanities, Duke University
- Arthur J. Bond – dean of the School of Engineering and Technology at Alabama A&M University and civil rights activist
- Paul Weber – dean of Faculties and interim president of the Georgia Institute of Technology

==== Professors ====
- Christopher R. Agnew – social psychologist and professor in the Department of Psychological Sciences
- Nolan B. Aughenbaugh – Antarctic explorer and professor emeritus of Geological Engineering at the University of Mississippi
- Ibrahim (Abe) Baggili – CSE Division chair and Roger Richardson professor of computer science and cybersecurity, Louisiana State University
- James R. Barker – professor of Organizational Theory and Strategy, Waikato University
- Michael Baye – Bert Elwert Professor of Business Economics, Indiana University
- L. W. Beineke – professor of graph theory at Purdue University Fort Wayne
- Ronald A. Bosco – expert on Ralph Waldo Emerson, Puritan homiletics and poetics
- Ronald Breaker – Henry Ford II Professor of Molecular, Cellular, and Developmental Biology at Yale University
- Monty Buell – chair of the Department of History and Philosophy at Walla Walla University
- George Casella – statistician at Rutgers University, Cornell University, and the University of Florida
- James Samuel Coleman – author of the Coleman Report on the sociology of education
- Carl W. Condit – architectural historian, Northwestern University
- Clarence Cory – first professor in Mechanical and Electrical Engineering at UC Berkeley; received BME degree from Purdue University in 1889 at age 16 and a Doctor of Engineering degree from Purdue University in 1914
- Bruce E. Dale – professor of Chemical Engineering, Michigan State University
- Kenneth E. deGraffenreid – professor of Intelligence Studies, Institute of World Politics
- Victor Denenberg – developmental psychobiologist
- Ralph Faudree – mathematician, combinatorialist, provost at University of Memphis
- James Fieser – professor of philosophy at the University of Tennessee at Martin
- Allan Friedman – Guy L. Odom Professor of Neurological Surgery at Duke University Medical Center
- Michael T. Goodrich – mathematician, computer scientist, department chair at the University of California, Irvine
- Kevin Granata – adjunct professor, Department of Engineering Science and Mechanics and Mechanical Engineering at Virginia Tech; victim of the Virginia Tech massacre
- Ann E. Hagerman – professor of biochemistry at University of Miami
- William D. Haseman – computer science professor at the University of Wisconsin–Milwaukee and Carnegie Mellon University
- Larry Howell – professor of mechanical engineering, Brigham Young University
- Robert Owen Hutchins – professor organic chemistry at Drexel University
- Roger G. Ibbotson – professor of finance, Yale School of Management
- Richard Ian Kimball – professor of history, Brigham Young University
- Benn Konsynski – Goizueta Business School, Emory University
- Lawrence Landweber – John P. Morgridge Professor Emeritus of Computer Science at the University of Wisconsin–Madison
- Arthur H. Lefebvre – professor; head of the Department of Mechanical Engineering 1976–1993; pioneer of gas turbine technology and developer of fuel spray technology; professor at Cranfield University, UK
- G. V. Loganathan – professor, Department of Civil and Environmental Engineering at Virginia Tech; victim of the Virginia Tech massacre
- Fred Mannering – professor, College of Engineering, University of South Florida
- Donald Matthews – political scientist, University of Washington
- James McDonald – economist at Brigham Young University
- Deborah E. McDowell – English professor and author
- Scott A. McLuckey – John A. Leighty Distinguished Professor of Chemistry at Purdue University
- Dorothy Runk Mennen – theatre professor, author, founding president of the Voice and Speech Trainers Association
- Gary Milhollin – law professor, anti–nuclear weapons activist
- William F. Miller – vice president and provost, Stanford University
- William E. Moore – chemistry professor and vice chancellor for academic affairs at Southern University; first Black PhD in chemistry to graduate from Purdue
- Toby Moskowitz – financial economist, University of Chicago
- David Mount – computer scientist, University of Maryland
- J. Keith Murnighan – Harold H. Hines Jr. Distinguished Professor of Risk Management at the Kellogg School of Management, Northwestern University
- Donna J. Nelson – chemistry professor; Nelson Diversity Surveys author, scientific workforce scholar (postdoctorate 1980–1983)
- Robert W. Newcomb – professor of electrical engineering at the University of Maryland
- Dallin D. Oaks – linguistics professor at Brigham Young University
- Peter N. Peregrine – anthropologist and archaeologist
- Larry L. Peterson – computer scientist at Princeton University
- Ronald L. Phillips – biologist, University of Minnesota
- T. Pradeep – professor of Chemistry, Indian Institute of Technology Madras, Chennai, India
- Steven Pray – Bernhardt Professor of Nonprescription Products and Devices at Southwestern Oklahoma State University
- John C. Reynolds – computer scientist
- Sherwin Rosen – labor economist
- Lyle F. Schoenfeldt – business management professor, known for a standard textbook on human resources
- Granville Sewell – mathematician and intelligent design advocate
- Thomas B. Sheridan – professor of mechanical engineering at the Massachusetts Institute of Technology, pioneer of robotics and remote control technology
- Carolyn Sherif – social psychologist
- Stephen C. Smith PhD – sociology professor and researcher; family therapist
- Murray Sperber – professor emeritus of English and American Studies at Indiana University, author of several books on college sports
- John W. Sutherland – professor and Fehsenfeld Family Head of Environmental and Ecological Engineering (EEE), Purdue University
- Yizhi Jane Tao – Rice University biochemist who mapped the structure of the influenza A virus nucleoprotein to an atomic level
- James Tour – synthetic organic chemist and nanotechnologist at Rice University
- Ralph von Frese – geophysicist who identified the Wilkes Land mass concentration in Antarctica
- Gregory Weeks – international relations scholar at Webster University Vienna
- Donald Weeks – Maxcy Professor Emeritus of Agriculture and Natural Resources at the University of Nebraska–Lincoln
- Jill Zimmerman – computer scientist and the James M. Beall Professor of Mathematics and Computer Science at Goucher College

=== Science and technology ===
==== Astronauts and aviators ====
- Neil Armstrong – Gemini 8, Apollo 11; first man to walk on the Moon
- John Blaha – STS-29, STS-33, STS-43, STS-58, STS-79, STS-81
- Roy D. Bridges – STS-51-F
- Mark N. Brown – STS-28, STS-48
- John H. Casper – STS-36, STS-54, STS-62, STS-77
- Eugene Cernan – Gemini 9A, Apollo 10, Apollo 17; most recent man to walk on the Moon
- Roger Chaffee – killed in Apollo 1 accident
- Richard O. Covey – STS-51-I, STS-26, STS-38, STS-61
- Andrew J. Feustel – STS-125, STS-134
- Guy S. Gardner – STS-27, STS-35
- Henry C. Gordon – Air Force colonel selected for Boeing X-20 Dyna-Soar program
- Virgil I. Grissom – second American in space, Gemini 3, killed in Apollo 1 accident
- Guy Gruters – fighter pilot and prisoner of war in the Vietnam War
- Gregory J. Harbaugh – STS-39, STS-54, STS-71, STS-82
- Iven Carl Kincheloe Jr. – flying ace of the Korean War, first pilot to fly above 100,000 feet (30,480 m)
- Michael J. McCulley – STS-34
- Loral O'Hara – Soyuz MS-24
- Gary E. Payton – STS-51-C
- Mark L. Polansky – STS-98, STS-116, STS-127
- Jerry L. Ross – STS-61-B, STS-27, STS-37, STS-55, STS-74, STS-88, STS-110; holds the US record for spaceflights
- Karl Schoen – one of the first U.S. flying aces of World War I
- Loren J. Shriver – STS-51-C, STS-31, STS-46
- Chesley "Sully" Sullenberger – pilot of US Airways flight 1549 which successfully ditched in the Hudson River
- Scott D. Tingle – Soyuz MS-07
- Janice E. Voss – STS-57, STS-63, STS-83, STS-94, STS-99
- Charles D. Walker – STS-41-D, STS-51-D, STS-61-B
- Mary E. Weber – STS-70, STS-101
- George Welch – World War II fighter pilot and test pilot; best known for shooting down four Japanese planes during the attack on Pearl Harbor
- Donald E. Williams – STS-51-D, STS-34
- David A. Wolf – STS-58, STS-86, Mir 24, STS-89, STS-112, STS-127

==== Engineers ====
- Joy Lim Arthur – first female engineer at White Sands Missile Range
- Mohamed Atalla – Distinguished Engineering Alumnus, inventor of MOSFET (metal–oxide–semiconductor field-effect transistor), pioneer in silicon semiconductors and security systems, founder of Atalla Corporation
- Stephen Bechtel Jr. – chairman emeritus of Bechtel Group
- Don R. Berlin – chief designer of several military aircraft of World War II
- Afua Bruce – executive director of the National Science and Technology Council in the Office of Science Technology and Policy at the White House, chief program officer at DataKind
- Orestes H. Caldwell – one of the first five members of the Federal Radio Commission
- Abraham Burton Cohen – civil engineer notable for designing record-breaking concrete bridges such as the Tunkhannock Viaduct
- John P. Costas – electrical engineer, inventor of the Costas loop and the Costas array
- Wayne Hale – NASA engineer
- Mamoon Hamid – managing member and general partner at Kleiner Perkins
- Richard E. Hayden – acoustics engineer, won the Wright Brothers Medal in 1973 for a research paper on noise reduction for STOL aircraft
- Daniel Lau – electrical engineer
- John Joseph Martin – mechanical engineer, author of Atmospheric Entry
- John H. McMasters – aeronautical engineer
- Elwood Mead – commissioner of the Bureau of Reclamation for construction of Grand Coulee, Hoover and Owyhee dams; namesake of Lake Mead
- Benjamin Franklin Miessner – engineer and inventor (did not graduate)
- Daniel Raymer – aerospace engineer
- Henry Sampson – inventor and nuclear engineer
- Malcolm Slaney – electrical engineer and research scientist at Google
- Games Slayter – chemical engineer, inventor of fiberglass
- Gunter Stein – electrical engineer
- Bill Young – chemical engineer and pharmaceutical industry executive

==== Researchers ====
- Chris Amemiya – geneticist
- Robert C. Baker – inventor of the chicken nugget
- Fernley H. Banbury – inventor of the Banbury mixer in 1916
- Farhan Baqai – camera engineer at Apple Inc. and IEEE fellow
- Myron L. Bender – biochemist, recipient of the Midwest Award of the American Chemical Society
- Seymour Benzer – physicist and biologist, winner of the Wolf Prize in Medicine in 1991
- Henry Luke Bolley – botanist, plant pathologist, and football coach
- Richard Bootzin – clinical and research psychologist
- Robert D. Cess – atmospheric scientist
- Rita R. Colwell – environmental microbiologist and scientific administrator; director of National Science Foundation
- Ward Cunningham – inventor of the wiki concept
- Harry Daghlian – physics, the first peacetime fatality of nuclear fission
- Joel Emer – microprocessor architect and Intel Fellow
- Dan Farmer – computer security researcher
- Martin Feinberg – mathematician and chemical engineer
- Elizabeth J. Feinler – information scientist and Internet pioneer
- Gloria Niemeyer Francke – pharmacist and science writer
- William H. Gerstenmaier – associate administrator at NASA
- Norman E. Gibbs – software engineering researcher
- Millicent Goldschmidt – microbiologist and 2006 "Outstanding Alumni", Purdue Department of Biological Sciences
- Jonathan Grudin – researcher of human–computer interaction and computer-supported cooperative work
- Kun-Liang Guan – biochemist
- Clarence Hansell – research engineer who pioneered investigation into the biological effects of ionized air
- Obed Crosby Haycock – researcher of the upper atmosphere
- Jesse E. Hobson – director of SRI International
- Deng Jiaxian – physicist, "father of the Chinese A-bomb"
- Bradford Keeney – psychotherapist, ethnographer, cybernetician
- Gerhard Klimeck – nanotechnologist
- Harry Kloor – physicist, chemist, screenwriter
- Bertram Kostant – mathematician
- Markus Kuhn – computer scientist
- Matthew Luckiesh – "father of the science of seeing"
- Robert W. Lucky – electrical engineer, inventor, and research manager
- Andrew Majda – ISI highly cited researcher in mathematics
- Herbert Newby McCoy – chemist
- Elwood Mead – former head, Bureau of Reclamation; oversaw the construction of Hoover Dam
- Marilyn T. Miller – pediatric ophthalmologist
- Ben Roy Mottelson – Nobel laureate in Physics in 1975
- Ian Murdock – founder of the Debian Project
- David E. Nichols – pharmacologist, world-renowned expert on psychedelics, founder of the Heffter Institute
- Alex Golden Oblad – chemist and chemical engineer who worked on catalysis
- Edward Mills Purcell – Nobel laureate in Physics in 1952
- C. N. R. Rao – solid-state and materials chemist
- Malcolm Ross – director of the US Navy manned balloon program Project Strato-Lab; set the current altitude record for manned balloon flight with Victor Prather in 1961
- Stacy Sims – exercise physiologist with a focus on women's health and fitness
- Joel Spira – inventor of the electronic solid-state dimmer
- Yitang Zhang – mathematician known for his work with twin primes
- Ming-Ming Zhou – structural and chemical biologist

=== Arts and entertainment ===
- Robert K. Abbett – book-cover illustrator and outdoor painter
- George Ade – humorist
- Ted Allen – host of Chopped and Queer Eye
- Max Armstrong – agriculture broadcaster in Chicago
- Donald Bain – author and ghostwriter (Murder, She Wrote; Coffee, Tea or Me)
- John Bevere – author and televangelist
- Monte Blue – actor of the silent film era, later a character actor
- Millie Bobby Brown – actress, known for her role in the television series Stranger Things and Enola Holmes films
- Jack Cashill – author, journalist, blogger, contributor to WorldNetDaily
- Kenneth Choi – actor, known for his role as Jim Morita in Captain America: The First Avenger, also Red Dawn and sitcoms
- Kate Collins – author of Flower Shop Mysteries
- Trevor Collins – manager at Achievement Hunter
- Thomas James De la Hunt – Indiana historian and columnist
- Eric Dill – musician, member of the band The Click Five
- Simone Elkeles – young-adult romance writer
- Dick Florea – television personality in Fort Wayne, Indiana
- William R. Forstchen – novelist
- Jim Gaffigan – comedian and actor
- JoAnn Giordano – textile artist
- Mass Giorgini – punk rock producer of bands such as Rise Against and Anti-Flag and bassist for Screeching Weasel and Squirtgun
- Gerald Jay Goldberg – novelist
- Harold Gray – creator of Little Orphan Annie comic strip
- Jeff Grubb – author and game designer
- Gabriel Gudding – essayist and poet
- Moira Gunn – host of National Public Radio programs Tech Nation and BioTech Nation
- John Guzlowski – author
- Stephen McKinley Henderson – actor
- Jack Horkheimer – host of astronomy television program Jack Horkheimer: Star Gazer
- Benjamin Bean Horner – architect and photographer
- Steve Horton – New York Times bestselling graphic novelist
- Rick Karr – journalist
- Callie Khouri – screenwriter, director, and film producer
- Jane King – business journalist
- Michael King – political commentator, columnist, television producer
- Harry Kloor – screenwriter, physicist, chemist
- Mercedes Lackey – fantasy novelist
- Wayne Lamb – Broadway and television dancer and professor emeritus of Theatre
- Delita Martin – printmaker and mixed media artist
- Ian McCollum – YouTuber, firearm historian; owner and host of the website and YouTube channel Forgotten Weapons
- John T. McCutcheon – cartoonist, recipient of a Pulitzer Prize in 1931
- Hoshang Merchant – poet
- Felicia Middlebrooks – radio news broadcaster
- Gavin Mikhail – pianist, singer-songwriter
- Karen Marie Moning – novelist
- Tom Moore – theater director
- Ciara Myst (Ryan Straut) – drag queen from season 18 of RuPaul's Drag Race
- Carrie Newcomer – singer and songwriter
- Clifton Nicholson – sculptor and jewelry designer
- Mark O'Hare – writer and cartoonist who has worked on various Nickelodeon and Cartoon Network programs such as Rocko's Modern Life
- Bree Olsen – adult film actress
- Chubby Parker – folk musician
- George Peppard (attended) – actor
- Bob Peterson – animator, screenwriter, director and voice actor at Pixar
- Julian Phillips – Emmy Award winner, co-host of weekend Fox & Friends, Fox TV
- Carol Plum-Ucci – young-adult novelist and essayist
- Pat Proctor – war game developer, U.S. Army lieutenant colonel
- Bruce Rogers – typographer, inventor of the Centaur typeface
- Dulquer Salmaan – Indian actor and film producer
- Peter Schneider – film executive, the Walt Disney Company
- Dave Schulthise – punk rock bass guitarist for the Dead Milkmen
- Gary Mark Smith – artist, author, master global street photographer
- Richard Sprague – author and researcher of the John F. Kennedy assassination
- Martha Hopkins Struever – dealer and scholar of American Indian art
- Elizabeth Stuckey-French – short story writer and novelist
- Booth Tarkington – novelist
- Stephanie S. Tolan – children's book author
- Martin Walls – poet
- Don West – pitchman, television personality, wrestling broadcaster
- Perry Wilson – movie critic, thecinemapsycho.com
- Lebbeus Woods – artist and architect

=== Business and industry ===
- Samuel R. Allen (BS 1977) – CEO of John Deere
- Chuck Armstrong – president of the Seattle Mariners
- Joyce Beber – advertising executive, promoter of hotelier Leona Helmsley
- Beth Bechdol – director of agribusiness strategies at Ice Miller, president and CEO of AgriNovus Indiana, Deputy Director-General of FAO
- Stephen Bechtel Jr. – chairman emeritus and director of Bechtel Group, Inc.
- Paul Bevilaqua – chief engineer, Advanced Development Projects, Lockheed Martin Skunk Works
- Gordon Binder – former CEO of Amgen (1988–2000)
- Michael Birck – chairman and founder of Tellabs, Inc.
- Charles F. Bowman – co-founder of Orville Redenbacher's Gourmet Popping Corn
- Beth Brooke – global vice chair of public policy for Ernst & Young
- Susan Bulkeley Butler – first female partner at Accenture; author of Become the CEO of You, Inc.
- Herman Cain (MS '71) – businessman, politician, and columnist; former chairman and CEO of Godfather's Pizza
- James Cash Jr. – member of the boards of directors at General Electric, Microsoft, and Walmart
- JoMei Chang – co-founder of Tibco Software
- Allen Chao – co-founder of Watson Pharmaceuticals
- Richard E. Dauch – co-founder of American Axle & Manufacturing
- Rodger Dean Duncan – author and business consultant
- Michael L. Eskew – chairman and CEO, UPS
- Robert M. Feustel – leader of various railroad and energy companies; later served on Purdue University's Board of Trustees.
- Gen Fukunaga – president of FUNimation
- Greg Hayes (1982) – CEO and chair of RTX Corporation; Business Roundtable member
- Gerald D. Hines (BSME 1948) – real estate developer and principal of Hines
- John R. Horne (BS 1960) – former CEO of Navistar
- Brian Lamb – co-founder, chairman, and CEO of C-SPAN
- Howard Lance – CEO of Maxar Technologies
- Marshall Larsen – former chairman, president, and CEO of Goodrich Corporation
- Cook Lougheed – entrepreneur and philanthropist
- Bala S. Manian – medical technology entrepreneur
- Preston McAfee – economist at Google
- Steven McGeady – former Intel executive
- Wade Miquelon – executive vice president and chief financial officer for Walgreens
- Herman H. Pevler – former president of the Norfolk and Western Railway and of the Wabash Railroad
- Patricia Kessler Poppe – president & CEO, CMS and Consumers Energy, CEO of Pacific Gas & Electric Company
- Orville Redenbacher – business leader and agriculturalist; co-founder of Orville Redenbacher's popcorn
- Donald Rice – CEO of Agensys and board member of Wells Fargo Bank
- David Ricks – chair and CEO of pharmaceutical company Eli Lilly and Company
- Lee Schmidt – golf course architect, co-founder of Lee-Schmidt Design, Inc.
- Edmund Schweitzer – president of Schweitzer Engineering Laboratories
- Ruth Siems – home economist with General Foods, inventor of Stovetop Stuffing
- Venu Srinivasan – chairman of TVS Motor
- Don Thompson – CEO of McDonald's
- James A. Thomson – president and CEO, Rand Corporation
- Paul C. Varga – former chief executive officer and chairman of Brown–Forman
- Gregory Wasson – president and chief operating officer, Walgreens corporation
- Sanjiva Weerawarana – co-founder, chairman and CEO of WSO2

=== Government and law ===
==== National office ====
- Akinwumi Adesina – president of the African Development Bank
- Rashid al-Rifai – ambassador and government minister in Iraq
- Joseph Kingsley Baffour-Senkyire – Ghanaian academic, politician and diplomat; member of parliament in the first republic of Ghana and formerly Ghana's ambassador to the United States
- Jim Baird – U.S. representative from Indiana's 4th district (R)
- Donald W. Banner – former U.S. commissioner of Patents and Trademarks
- Joe L. Barton – U.S. representative from 6th District of Texas (R)
- Birch Bayh – former United States senator from Indiana (D)
- Earl L. Butz – former secretary of the United States Department of Agriculture (R)
- Chang Chia-juch – former minister of economic affairs of Taiwan
- Bob Charles – former member of the Australian House of Representatives
- Mark Chen – former secretary-general and former minister of foreign affairs of Taiwan
- Curt Clawson – U.S. representative from Florida's 19th congressional district (R)
- Chuck Conner – acting secretary of the United States Department of Agriculture
- Margaret E. Curran – United States attorney for Rhode Island
- Harry Allison Estep – Republican member of the U.S. House of Representatives from Pennsylvania (R)
- Fahmi Fadzil – member of Malaysian House of Representatives and minister of Communications and Digital
- Mauricio Fernández Garza – former mayor of San Pedro Garza García (1989–1991) and former Mexican senator from Nuevo León (1994–2000)
- Gary A. Grappo – U.S. ambassador to Oman
- John H. Hager – lieutenant governor of Virginia, U.S. assistant secretary of Education (R)
- Keith Hall – former commissioner of the U.S. Bureau of Labor Statistics
- Clifford M. Hardin – former secretary of the United States Department of Agriculture (R)
- Ralph Harvey – U.S. representative from Indiana (R)
- Adnan Kahveci – Turkish minister of state and minister of finance, founding member of the Motherland Party
- Keith J. Krach – former U.S. under secretary of state; chairman/CEO of DocuSign and Ariba; chairman of Purdue Board of Trustees
- Suwat Liptapanlop – government minister in Thailand
- David McKinley – U.S. representative for West Virginia (R)
- Ted McKinney – U.S. under secretary, Trade & Foreign Agricultural Affairs, USDA; CEO of National Association of State Departments of Agriculture-NASDA
- Anthony W. Miller – United States deputy secretary of education
- Marwan Muasher – deputy prime minister, Hashemite Kingdom of Jordan
- Kinjarapu Ram Mohan Naidu – member of Parliament in India
- Purbaya Yudhi Sadewa – minister of finance of Indonesia
- Essam Sharaf – former prime minister of Egypt
- Jefferson Shreve – U.S. representative from Indiana's 6th congressional district
- Ann Stock – U.S. assistant secretary of state for educational and cultural affairs
- Kevin Sullivan – White House communications director
- Claude R. Wickard – former U.S. secretary of agriculture
- Richard Llewellyn Williams – first U.S. ambassador to Mongolia

==== Military ====
- Terry M. Cross – former vice commandant of the United States Coast Guard
- Fahmi Fadzil – member of Parliaments in Malaysia
- Nelson F. Gibbs – U.S. assistant secretary of the Air Force
- Sun Liren – Chinese Nationalist general who excelled in the Burma Campaign during World War II
- Carter B. Magruder – four-star general, U.S. Army
- Glen W. Martin – inspector general of the U.S. Air Force
- Frank C. McConnell – US Army brigadier general
- B. J. Penn – former assistant secretary of the U.S. Navy
- Carol M. Pottenger – vice admiral, U.S. Navy
- Jerald D. Slack – U.S. Air National Guard major general, adjutant general of Wisconsin
- David D. Thompson – United States Space Force general who has served as the first vice chief of space operations
- Derek Tournear – director of the Space Development Agency
- Carol I. Turner – former chief of the United States Navy Dental Corps
- James C. Van Sice – former superintendent of the U.S. Coast Guard Academy
- Russell R. Waesche – commandant of the U.S. Coast Guard during World War II

==== Sub-national office ====
- Ron Alting – Indiana state senator (R)
- Brian Bosma – speaker of the Indiana General Assembly
- Robert J. Burkhardt – former secretary of state of New Jersey (D)
- Suzanne Crouch – 52nd lieutenant governor of Indiana (R)
- Sue Ellspermann – lieutenant governor of Indiana (R)
- Kirk Fordice – former governor of Mississippi (R)
- Kent Gaffney – former member of the Illinois House of Representatives (R)
- Chuck Goodrich – member of the Indiana House of Representatives
- Elaine Hopson (BA 1959) – Oregon state representative (D)
- Matt Hostettler – member of the Indiana House of Representatives (R)
- Delores G. Kelley – Maryland state senator (D)
- Sheila Klinker – member of the Indiana House of Representatives (D)
- J. Tom Lendrum – member of the Ohio House of Representatives (R)
- Harry G. Leslie – former governor of Indiana (R)
- Robert Presley O'Bannon – member of the Indiana Senate (D)
- Alan Olsen – Oregon state senator (R)
- Paul Parks – Massachusetts secretary of education (D)
- Zach Payne – member of the Indiana House of Representatives
- Scott Reske – member of the Indiana House of Representatives (D)
- William Ridenour – member of the West Virginia House of Delegates (R)
- Larry Ross – member of the New Hampshire House of Representatives (R)
- Darlene Senger – member of the Illinois House of Representatives (R)
- Wayne Townsend – member of both houses of the Indiana legislature and the Democratic candidate for governor in 1984 (D)
- Frank Watson – member of the Illinois Senate (R)

==== Local office ====
- Isaac Colton Ash – Los Angeles, California, City Council member
- Jane Baker – first female mayor of San Mateo, California
- John J. Barton – former mayor of Indianapolis, Indiana (D)
- Marty Blum – former mayor of Santa Barbara, California
- Elgin English Crull – longest serving city manager of Dallas, Texas to date (1952–1966); was city manager when John F. Kennedy was assassinated
- A.E. Henning – Los Angeles, California, City Council member, 1929–1933
- Robert J. LaFortune – former mayor of Tulsa, Oklahoma
- Bart Peterson – former mayor of Indianapolis, Indiana (D)
- David H. Rodgers – former mayor of Spokane, Washington (R)

==== Other political and legal figures ====
- Nels Ackerson – lawyer, 2008 candidate for U.S. Congress from Indiana (D)
- Allen Alley – Oregon Republican Party chairman
- Roberto Feliberti Cintrón – associate justice of the Supreme Court of Puerto Rico
- Uthum Herat – deputy governor of the Central Bank of Sri Lanka and alternate executive director of the International Monetary Fund
- Jeffrey M. Lacker – president of Federal Reserve Bank of Richmond
- Charles Mok – Hong Kong Legislative Council member
- Marilyn Quayle – lawyer, novelist, and political figure, wife of former U.S. Vice President Dan Quayle
- Kyle Roche, cryptocurrency lawyer

=== Sports ===
==== Baseball ====
- Bernie Allen – 12-year career infielder with the Minnesota Twins, Washington Senators, New York Yankees and Montreal Expos; also played for the Boilermakers
- Jermaine Allensworth – former Major League Baseball player
- Roger Bossard – head groundskeeper for the Chicago White Sox, sports turf consultant for MLB, NFL, Major League Soccer
- Jay Buente – relief pitcher for the Florida Marlins
- Michael Duursma – shortstop for the Netherlands national baseball team
- Bob Friend – former MLB pitcher; 4-time All-Star, World Series Champion
- Josh Lindblom – relief pitcher for the Philadelphia Phillies
- Joe McCabe – former Major League baseball player
- Cameron Perkins – infielder for the Philadelphia Phillies
- Kevin Plawecki – catcher for the Boston Red Sox
- Moose Skowron – former Major League Baseball player; 6-time All-Star, 5-time World Series Champion
- Nick Wittgren – relief pitcher for the Miami Marlins

==== Basketball ====
- Brian Cardinal – NBA champion Dallas Mavericks, former professional NBA basketball player 2000–12
- Joe Barry Carroll – NCAA Final Four 1980, former NBA basketball player, 1st pick overall in NBA draft (1980)
- Terry Dischinger – former NBA basketball player (1962–73); NBA Rookie of the Year; Olympic gold in basketball (1960)
- Katie Douglas – former basketball player in the WNBA
- Ray Eddy – former Purdue Boilermakers men's basketball head coach
- Zach Edey – 2-time consensus national player of the year (2023–24), 2-time all American; currently playing for the Memphis Grizzlies
- Carsen Edwards – NBA player Boston Celtics, twice named an All-American
- Herm Gilliam – NBA champion Portland Trail Blazers, NBA player (1969–77), NCAA Finals 1969
- Paul Hoffman – former NBA player, BAA Rookie of the Year (1947), NBA Champion (1948), former general manager for the Baltimore Bullets
- Robbie Hummel – 1st Team All-Big Ten; professional basketball player for the Minnesota Timberwolves
- Jaden Ivey (2020–22) – top 5 pick in NBA draft; currently plays for Chicago Bulls
- JaJuan Johnson – Big-Ten Player of the Year; current professional basketball in the Israeli Basketball Premier League
- Billy Keller – NCAA Finals 1969, 3-time ABA champion, former University of Indianapolis men's basketball coach
- Frank Kendrick – former NBA player and NBA champion (1975), Golden State Warriors
- Carl Landry – 1st Team All-Big Ten; NBA player for the Sacramento Kings
- Alan Major – former head coach of the Charlotte 49ers
- Cuonzo Martin – current head coach of the Missouri Tigers men's basketball
- Brad Miller – former NBA basketball player, two-time NBA All-Star
- E'Twaun Moore – 1st Team All-Big Ten; last played for the NBA Phoenix Suns
- Rick Mount – three-time All-American at Purdue and two-time Big Ten Player of the Year; NCAA Finals 1969; former American Basketball Association basketball player
- Matt Painter – current Purdue Boilermakers men's basketball head coach, former coach at Southern Illinois University, 16 NCAA Tournament appearances
- Glenn Robinson – 1994 NCAA Player of the Year (John R. Wooden Award, Naismith Awards and four other polls), two-time 1st Team All-American; former NBA player, 1st pick overall in NBA draft (1994); NBA champion (2005) with San Antonio Spurs
- Amy Ruley – North Dakota State University women's basketball coach
- Dave Schellhase – first-team All-American at Purdue; former Indiana State Sycamores men's basketball head coach, former Minnesota State-Moorhead head coach
- Jerry Sichting – NBA champion Boston Celtics, NBA player (1980–90), NCAA Final Four 1980
- Kevin Stallings – former Vanderbilt Commodores men's basketball head coach, former coach at Illinois State University
- Caleb Swanigan – NCAA National Player of the Year 2017, NBA first-round draft pick, Big Ten Player of the year 2017
- Aaron Wheeler (2017–21) – basketball forward in the Israeli Basketball Premier League
- Stephanie White (1995–99) – former professional basketball player and the current head coach of the Indiana Fever of the WNBA
- Howie Williams – Olympic gold in basketball (1952), AAU National champion (1952, 1953)
- Trevion Williams (born 2000) – basketball player for Maccabi Tel Aviv of the Israeli Basketball Premier League
- John Wooden – Basketball Hall of Fame honoree as both player and coach; 10-time NCAA Champion coach at UCLA; 1932 National champion and All-American as player

==== Football ====
- Mike Alstott – former NFL and Super Bowl Champion fullback for the Tampa Bay Buccaneers, Purdue's all-time leading rusher
- Cliff Avril – NFL defensive end of the Seattle Seahawks; Champion Super Bowl XLVIII and participated in XLIX
- Ryan Baker – NFL defensive end for the Miami Dolphins, 2009–2012
- Derrick Barnes – linebacker drafted in the 4th round 113th pick in 2021; currently plays for the Detroit Lions
- Erich Barnes – NFL defensive back, four-time All-Pro
- David Blough – NFL offensive coordinator for the Washington Commanders
- George Bolan – Chicago Staleys (1921), Bears (1922–24)
- Drew Brees (Class of 2000) – former quarterback for the National Football League Super Bowl Champion, Super Bowl MVP, All-Pro, Pro Bowl quarterback, San Diego Chargers (2001–2005) and New Orleans Saints (2006–2020), Maxwell Award; 2x Heisman Trophy finalist; Rose Bowl Game; winner of 2010 Super Bowl XLIV
- Dave Butz – 16-year, 2x Super Bowl Champion NFL Lineman with the Washington Redskins and selected to the all NFL 1980s Team
- Scott Campbell – played quarterback for six seasons for the Pittsburgh Steelers and Atlanta Falcons
- Rosevelt Colvin – 2x Super Bowl Champion, professional football player in the NFL with the Chicago Bears and New England Patriots
- Gary Danielson – former NFL quarterback; current TV announcer, college football
- Len Dawson – Pro Football Hall of Fame quarterback with the Kansas City Chiefs, Super Bowl IV MVP
- Jim Everett – Pro Bowl NFL quarterback; Saint Louis Rams, New Orleans Saints, San Diego Chargers
- Tim Foley – former defensive back for Purdue and defensive back for Miami Dolphins Super Bowl Champions
- Gilbert Gardner – NFL linebacker, member of the Super Bowl XLI-winning Indianapolis Colts
- Wayne Gift – NFL player with the Cleveland Rams
- Bob Griese – Pro Football Hall of Fame quarterback with the Miami Dolphins; led Dolphins to 17-0-0 perfect season; 2x Super Bowl Champion quarterback; College Football Hall of Fame, Rose Bowl Champion quarterback
- Steve Griffin – former NFL and Arena Football League player
- Nick Hardwick – former NFL center of the San Diego Chargers
- Matt Hernandez – NFL offensive tackle
- Mark Herrmann – former NFL quarterback with the Indianapolis Colts and San Diego Chargers; 3-time Bowl game MVP with Purdue, Heisman Trophy finalist
- Paul Humphrey – NFL center for the Brooklyn Dodgers
- Clarence Janecek – NFL offensive guard of the Pittsburgh Pirates
- Dustin Keller – NFL tight end with the Miami Dolphins
- Ryan Kerrigan – NFL linebacker of the Washington Redskins and Philadelphia Eagles; 1st Team All-American
- Ed Klewicki – Detroit Lions, 1930s
- Jon Krick – Arena Football League player
- John Letsinger – Pittsburgh Pirates, 1933
- Matt Light – NFL left tackle of the New England Patriots; 3x Super Bowl Champion Super Bowl (XXXVI, XXXVIII, XXXIX), and participated in XLII
- Jim Looney – NFL linebacker of the San Francisco 49ers
- Marc May – NFL tight end of the Minnesota Vikings
- Rondale Moore – NFL wide receiver of the Arizona Cardinals
- Raheem Mostert – NFL running back for the San Francisco 49ers
- Wave Myers – former coach at Ball State
- Mike Neal – NFL defensive tackle of the Green Bay Packers
- Rob Ninkovich – linebacker for the New England Patriots; has also played for the New Orleans Saints and the Miami Dolphins
- Kyle Orton – quarterback, drafted by the Chicago Bears had played for several NFL teams
- Curtis Painter – backup quarterback for the Indianapolis Colts, drafted in 2009 to succeed Peyton Manning
- Shaun Phillips – NFL defensive end of the Tennessee Titans
- Mike Phipps – College Football Hall of Fame former NFL Quarterback, Cleveland Browns, Chicago Bears, Heisman Trophy Runner-up
- Bernard Pollard – NFL safety of the Tennessee Titans
- Ed Rate – former NFL blocking back for the Milwaukee Badgers
- Karl Singer – AFL tackle for the Boston Patriots
- Joe Skibinski – former NFL guard for the Cleveland Browns and Green Bay Packers
- Ed Skoronski – NFL player
- Blane Smith – former NFL linebacker for the Green Bay Packers
- Anthony Spencer – NFL linebacker drafted by the Dallas Cowboys in 2007
- John Standeford – NFL wide receiver of the Detroit Lions, member of the Super Bowl XLI-winning Indianapolis Colts
- Darryl Stingley – former NFL wide receiver with the New England Patriots
- Hank Stram – Pro Football Hall of Fame coach of the Kansas City Chiefs
- Taylor Stubblefield – NCAA Division 1 football career receptions leader, played for the St. Louis Rams
- Kevin Sumlin (Class of 1989) – former head coach of the Arizona Wildcats; current associate head coach, co-offensive coordinator, and tight ends coach for the University of Maryland
- Michael Terrizzi – played briefly for the San Francisco 49ers
- Calvin Williams – NFL wide receiver of the Philadelphia Eagles; rookie of the year
- Clem Woltman – former NFL tackle for the Philadelphia Eagles
- Rod Woodson – Super Bowl Champion (XXXV), Pro Football Hall of Fame defensive back, 11-time Pro-Bowler (at three different positions) and former NFL cornerback

==== Other sports ====
- Stephan Bonnar – appeared on the first season of The Ultimate Fighter, retired professional mixed martial artist, two-time Golden Gloves Champion, UFC Hall of Fame member
- David Boudia – Olympic diver (2008, gold 2012, silver 2016)
- Larry Burton – Olympic runner (1976)
- Keith Carter – Olympic swimmer (silver, 1948)
- Joe Corso – Olympic wrestler (1976)
- Javier Díaz – Olympic swimmer for Mexico (2000, 2004)
- Dick the Bruiser – professional wrestling champion; real name William Afflis; also played in the NFL
- Amanda Elmore – Olympic rower (gold 2016)
- Ray Ewry – ten-time Olympic champion in track and field (gold, 1900, 1904, 1906, 1908)
- Jon Fitch – Boilermaker team captain wrestler; professional mixed martial artist, formerly with the Ultimate Fighting Championship
- Cliff Furnas – Olympic runner (1920)
- Ed Glover – Olympic pole-vaulter (bronze, 1906)
- Ray Gunkel – AAU Champion wrestler, NCAA semifinalist and professional champion
- Matt Hamill (attended) – three-time NCAA Division III National Champion in wrestling, silver and gold medalist of the 2001 Summer Deaflympics; mixed martial artist who fought in the Ultimate Fighting Championship; retired
- Lacey Hearn – Olympic athlete (1904)
- Chris Huffins – Olympic decathlete (1996, 2000)
- Steele Johnson – Olympic diver (silver 2016)
- Pariya Junhasavasdikul – Thai professional golfer who plays on the Asian Tour
- Shiv Kapur – professional golfer
- Gerald Koh – Olympic swimmer (2000)
- Gyöngyvér Lakos – Olympic swimmer (2000)
- Matt Mitrione – former NFL player and current heavyweight fighter for Bellator MMA
- Nate Moore – Boilermaker team captain wrestler; current MMA competitor, formerly fighting for Strikeforce
- Nedzad Mulabegovic – shot put for Croatia (2012)
- Betty Mullen-Brey – 100-meter butterfly (1956)
- Ryan Newman – 2008 Daytona 500 Champion, 2002 Winston Cup Rookie of the Year
- Jake O'Brien – Boilermaker wrestler; current MMA fighter, previously the WEC and the UFC
- Coralie O'Connor – swimming (1952)
- Kara Patterson – javelin (2012)
- Carol Pence-Taylor – Olympic swimmer (1948)
- Eric Rodwell – professional bridge player
- Joan Rosazza – Olympic swimmer (silver, 1956)
- Chris Schenkel – sportscaster
- Lauren Sesselmann – women's soccer for Canada (2012)
- Doug Sharp – Olympic bobsledder (2002)
- Miguel Torres (attended) – wrestler; current professional mixed martial arts fighter, former WEC Bantamweight Champion
- Frank Verner – Olympic athlete (1904)
- Fred Wampler – PGA Tour golfer
- Beth Whittall – 100-meter butterfly for Canada (1956)
- Jeanne Wilson-Vaughn – Olympic swimmer (1948)
- Fred Wilt – Olympic runner (1948)

=== Other alumni ===
- David A. Bednar – LDS Church apostle; former president of BYU-Idaho
- Vikram Buddhi – imprisoned for threatening the life of U.S. President George W. Bush
- Theodore M. Burton – LDS Church leader
- Kathy Calvin – chief executive officer, United Nations Foundation
- John Mark Dean – conservationist and marine biologist
- Russell Mawby – chairman emeritus, W.K. Kellogg Foundation
- Sarah Jo Pender – convicted murderer and prison escapee
- Eric Justin Toth – fugitive on the FBI Ten Most Wanted list
- Richard Leroy Walters – homeless philanthropist

== See also ==
- List of Purdue Boilermakers head football coaches
