= Ming-Ming =

Ming-Ming, Ming Ming, or Mingming may refer to:

== Name ==
- Huai Mingming (born 1995), Chinese bobsledder
- Ming-Ming Zhou, American scientist
- Mingming Wu, American professor
- Sun Mingming (born 1983), Chinese former basketball player
- Wu Ming-ming (born 1984), Taiwanese economist and politician
- Yang Mingming (born 1987), Chinese filmmaker

== Other uses ==
- Ming-Ming, a duckling the tv series Wonder Pets!
- Ming Ming, 2006 Hong Kong film by Susie Au
- Ming Ming (giant panda) (1977–2011), giant panda
