= Purdue University Daniels School of Business =

Business School of Purdue University

Coordinates: 40.423696°N 86.911060°W

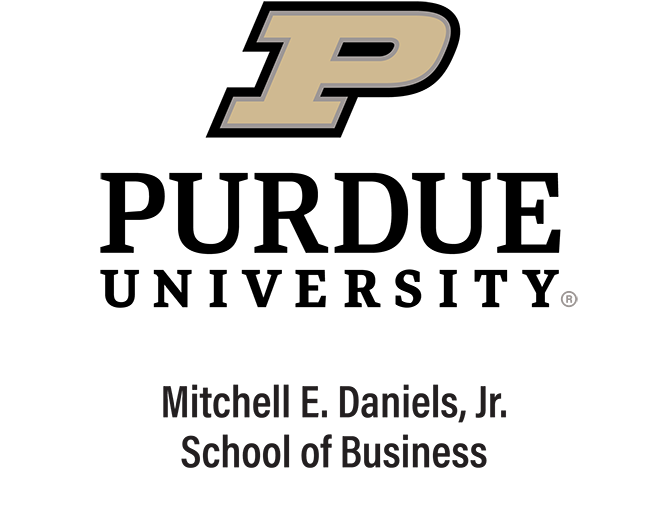
- Former names: Krannert Graduate School of Industrial Administration; Krannert School of Management
- Motto: Tech-focused, data-driven, STEM-infused, the Daniels School of Business equips next-gen leaders and visionary founders for an evolving tomorrow.
- Type: Public school
- Established: 1962
- Parent institution: Purdue University
- Dean: James B. Bullard
- Faculty: 227
- Students: 4,674 (2023–24)
- Undergraduates: 3,516 (2023–24)
- Postgraduates: 1,158 (2023–24)
- Location: West Lafayette, Indiana, United States
- Colors: Old Gold and Black
- Website: business.purdue.edu

The Purdue University Daniels School of Business (formerly known as the Krannert School of Management) is the school of business at Purdue University, a public research university in West Lafayette, Indiana. It offers instruction at the undergraduate, master's, and doctoral levels.

== History ==
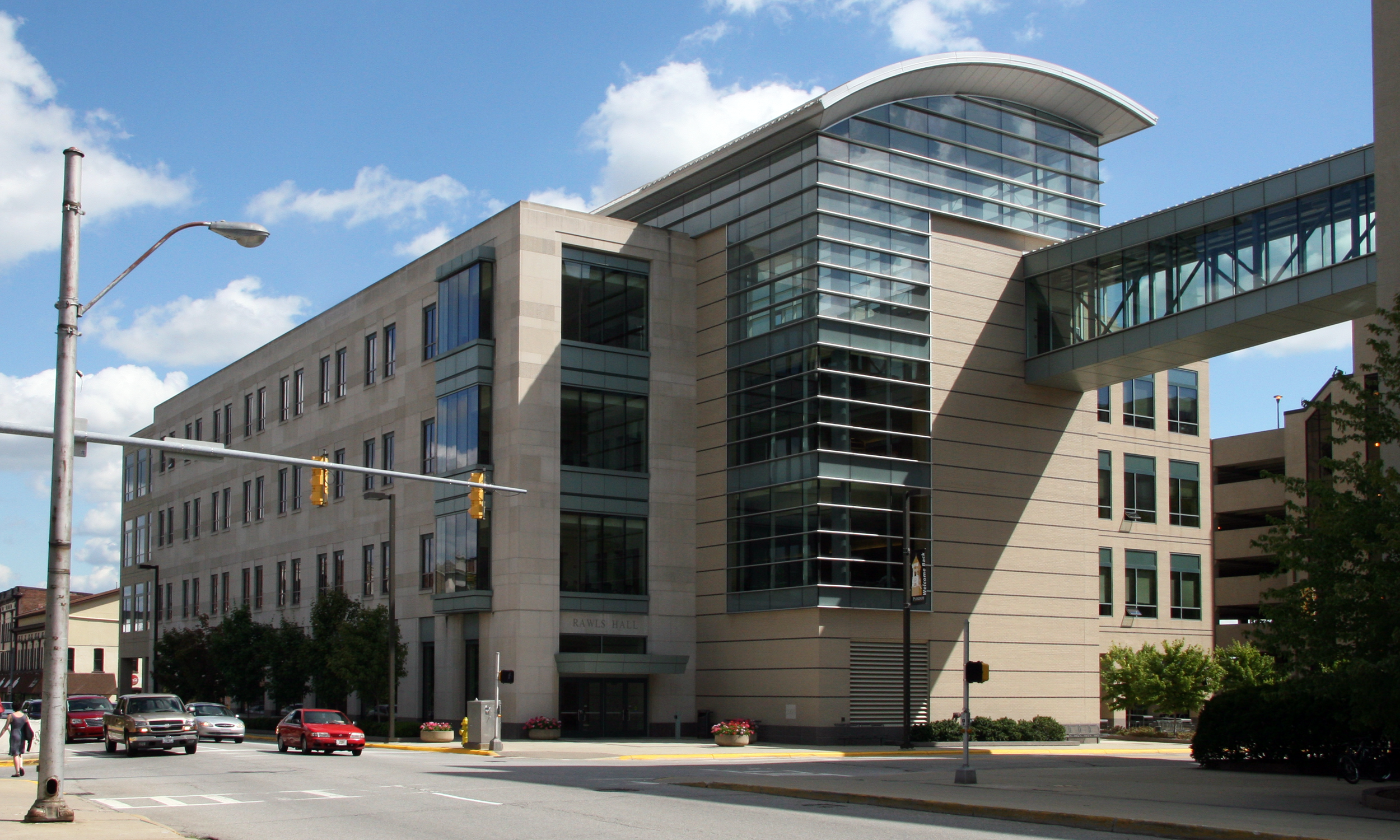
Rawls Hall at the university.

The School of Industrial Management at Purdue University was created in 1958 from the merger of the Department of Economics (established in the School of Science, Education, and Humanities in 1953) and the Department of Industrial Management and Transportation (part of the Schools of Engineering since 1956).

The Krannert Graduate School of Industrial Administration was founded in 1962 with a $2.7 million endowment from Herman Krannert and Ellnora Krannert. The AACSB accredited the new school in 1967. In the early years, students were required to pursue a second major, in a technical subject, in addition to their coursework in business and management. The curriculum expanded over the following decade, the word "Industrial" was dropped from the schools' names, and the school was renamed the Krannert School of Management in the mid-1970s.

On February 3, 2023, Purdue's business school was renamed the Mitchell E. Daniels Jr. School of Business, in honor of Mitch Daniels, who served as the 12th president of Purdue University from January 2013 to December 2022.

== Academics ==
Business school rankings

U.S. MBA Rankings
- U.S. News & World Report (2026): 74

Global MBA Rankings
- FT (2026): 75

Purdue's business school is accredited by the AACSB.

The Mitch Daniels School of Business differentiates itself from similarly sized business programs by providing an emphasis on a STEM-focused, data-driven education. All degrees awarded are Bachelors of Science.

=== Undergraduate: Bruce White Undergraduate Institute ===
On February 13, 2023, the Dean and Barbara White Family Foundation committed $50 million to Purdue University to name the undergraduate institute in the Mitch Daniels School of Business. The School of Business offers nine undergraduate degree programs. In keeping with the global scope of the modern manager, all programs include instruction in the international aspects of business and a strong technical background in engineering, data science, and quantitative reasoning skills. The Daniels School also offers qualified students a pipeline to any of their many specialized 1-year masters programs, allows students to complete their B.S. and an MS, Master of Business Administration (MBA), or their industry-leading Master of Business Technology (MBT) degree in just five years.

=== Master's and executive: Krannert Graduate Institute ===
The Krannert Graduate Institute at the Daniels School of Business awards several master's degrees: MBA, EMBA, International Masters in Management, Master of Science in Human Resource Management, Master of Science in Industrial Administration, Master of Science in Finance, Master of Science in Global Entrepreneurship, Master of Science in Global Supply Chain Management and a Weekend MBA. These programs are housed in Rawls Hall. The school also offers a variety of joint programs with other colleges on campus including the combined Doctor of Pharmacy (PharmD) and Master of Science in Industrial Administration (MSIA), the combined Bachelor of Science in Industrial Engineering (BSIE) and Master of Business Administration (MBA), and the combined Bachelor of Science in Mechanical Engineering (BSME) and Master of Business Administration (MBA)

In 2020, despite tight alumni classes and a well respected curriculum the School of Business was forced to pause its full time residential MBA program.

=== Doctoral ===
The School of Business's Doctoral Programs offer students the opportunity to work closely with first-rate faculty in the areas of Economics, Management (with concentrations in Accounting, Finance, Management Information Systems, Marketing, Operations Management, Quantitative Methods/Management Science, and Strategic Management), and Organizational Behavior & Human Resource Management (OBHR). The School of Business's doctoral programs were ranked #23 in the world for 2009 and #25 for 2013 by Financial Times.

=== Department of Economics ===
The Department of Economics at Purdue University is located at Daniels School of Business and offers undergraduate, master's, and PhD in economics. The department has the following centers - Purdue Center for Economic Education, Purdue University Research Center in Economics, Purdue Center for Behavioral Economics, Experiments and Public Policy and also Vernon Smith Experimental Economics Laboratory.

== Facilities ==
The school's facilities are located on the southeastern part of Purdue's West Lafayette campus near the Purdue Memorial Union. The majority of undergraduate classes are conducted in the Krannert Building, which opened in 1964.

=== Rawls Hall ===
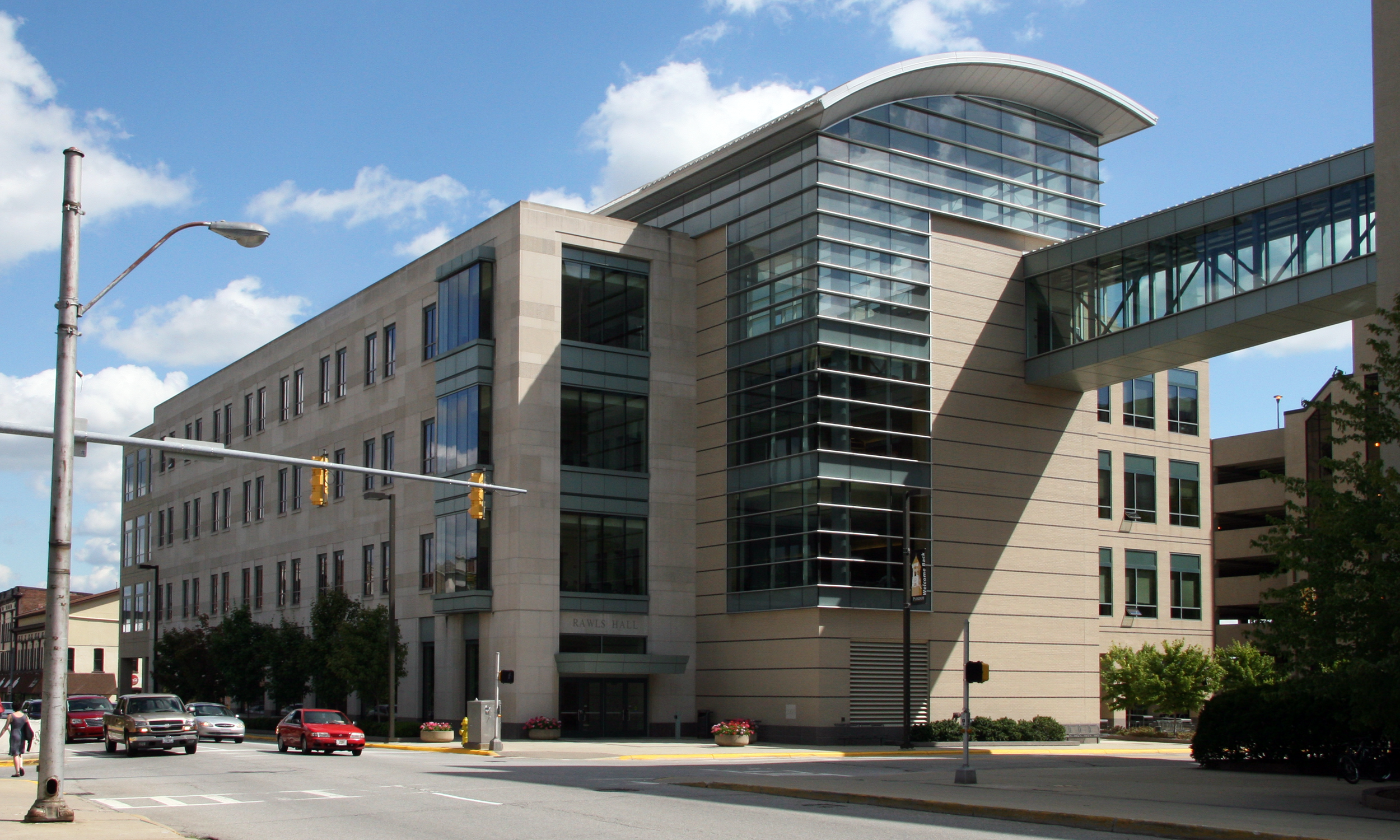
Rawls Hall

Rawls Hall is the home of all the classes in the Masters program. Rawls Hall houses 13 electronically equipped classrooms, a professional career center, a multimedia-based auditorium, 25 breakout rooms, distance learning facilities, and sophisticated computer labs. The building is named for business master's alum, Jerry S. Rawls. Rawls, the president and chief executive officer of Finisar Corp., donated $10 million to the Krannert at the Frontier Campaign. The gift was the largest in the school's history and one of the largest at Purdue. In recognition of his generosity, the Purdue Board of Trustees voted in 2000 to name the new facility Jerry S. Rawls Hall. The Jerry Rawls Hall was dedicated on October 2, 2003. In September 2022, Purdue announced the approval of $168 million in funding to construct a new state-of-the-art business building that will be built to hold the increase in students and faculty with an estimated completion of 2026. Upon completion, the new facility will be the most expensive building ever constructed on Purdue's West Lafayette campus.

== Alumni ==
- Sam Allen, retired chairman and chief executive officer for Deere & Company
- Susan Bulkeley Butler, founder and CEO of the SBB Institute, and first female partner of Accenture
- Drew Brees, retired NFL quarterback for the New Orleans Saints
- Beth Brooke-Marciniak, global vice chair of public policy for Ernst & Young
- Doug DeVos, president of Amway
- Joe Forehand, former chairman and CEO of Accenture
- Dave Fuente, chairman of SSA & Company
- Greg Hayes, Chairman of Raytheon Technologies
- Robbie Hummel, professional basketball player
- Howard Lance, executive advisor at The Blackstone Group, former chairman, president, and CEO of Harris Corporation
- Marshall Larsen, retired chairman, president, and CEO at Goodrich
- Jim Lewis, Senior Vice President of Walt Disney World
- Preston McAfee, chief economist at Microsoft
- Jerry S. Rawls, co-founder and chairman of Finisar
- Marshall Larsen, former CEO and Chairman of Goodrich Corporation

=== Academia ===
- Hugo F. Sonnenschein (PhD 1964), 11th President of University of Chicago
- Cynthia A. Montgomery, Professor at Harvard Business School
- Das Narayandas, Professor at Harvard Business School
- James Cash Jr., Professor at Harvard Business School
- Michael Baye, Professor at Kelley School of Business
- Jeffrey J. Reuer, Professor at University of Colorado-Boulder
- Toby Moskowitz, Professor at the Yale School of Management
- Arthur VanCleve Hill, Professor at University of Minnesota
- Anya Samek, Associate Professor at University of California, San Diego
- James McDonald, Professor at Brigham Young University
- Sherwin Rosen, Former Distinguished Service Professor in Economics at University of Chicago
- Arnold C. Cooper, management scholar

=== Armed Forces ===
- Keith A. Taylor, United States Coast Guard Rear Admiral
- Donald Rice, 17th United States Secretary of the Air Force
- Nelson F. Gibbs, former Assistant Secretary of the Air Force
- Terry M. Cross, United States Coast Guard Vice Admiral

=== Politics and government ===
- Joe Barton, former Member of the U.S. House of Representatives
- Matt Hostettler, Member of the Indiana House of Representatives
- Curt Clawson, former Member of the U.S. House of Representatives
- Abigail Spanbarger, 75th Governor of Virginia

=== Films and others ===
- Dulquer Salmaan, Indian film actor
- Ted Allen, author

== Faculty ==
- David Malpass, 13th President of the World Bank Group
- Jeffrey M. Lacker, Former President of the Federal Reserve Bank of Richmond
- Vernon L. Smith, Nobel Prize in Economics (2002)

== See also ==
- List of business schools in the United States
- List of United States graduate business school rankings
