= Bootzin =

Bootzin is a surname. Notable people with the surname include:

- Richard Bootzin (1940–2014), American psychologist
- Robert Bootzin (1914–2004), American health guru
