= Arthur VanCleve Hill =

Arthur VanCleve Hill (born February 20, 1950, Detroit, Michigan) is a Professor Emeritus of Operations Management and Associate Dean for MBA Programs in the Carlson School of Management at the University of Minnesota. He is the author of the Encyclopedia of Operations Management.

== Education ==
He attended the United States Military Academy at West Point from 1968 to 1970, then earned a B.A. in Mathematics at Indiana University in 1972, minoring in Russian. In 1974 he received an M.S. in Industrial Administration from the Krannert Graduate School of Management at Purdue University, and in 1977 he graduated from the same school with a Ph.D. in Management, including a major in Operations Management and a minor in Industrial Engineering/System Simulation).

== Personal ==
Arthur V. Hill lives in Eden Prairie, Minnesota with his wife, Julayne M. Hill. They have four children: Christopher, Jonathan, Stephen and Michael.

== Publications ==
- Hill, Arthur V. (1982). “An Experimental Comparison of Human Schedulers and Heuristic Algorithms for the Traveling Salesman Problem,” Journal of Operations Management, 2 (4), 215-223. This is the first behavioral research paper published in the Journal of Operations Management. It is highlighted on the front page of the Behavioral Dynamics in Operations Management website.
- Hill, Arthur V., and Thomas E. Vollmann (1986). “Reducing Vendor Delivery Uncertainties in a JIT Environment,” Journal of Operations Management, 6 (4), 381-392.
- Hill, Arthur V., and Inder S. Khosla (1992). “Models for Optimal Lead Time Reduction,” Production and Operations Management, 1 (2), 185-197.
- Hill, Arthur V., Field Service Management: an Integrated Approach to Increasing Customer Satisfaction. New York: McGraw-Hill, 1992
- Hays, Julie M., and Arthur V. Hill (1999). “The Market Share Impact of Service Failures,” Production and Operations Management, 8 (3), 208-220.
- Hays, Julie M., and Arthur V. Hill (2001). “A Preliminary Investigation of the Relationships between Employee Motivation/Vision, Service Learning, and Perceived Service Quality.” Journal of Operations Management, 19 (3), 335-349. (According to the JOM website, this article was one of the top ten requested articles in the Journal of Operations Management for 2001. This article was used as a “notable illustration” of the importance of behavioral theory in the call for papers for the JOM special issue on “Incorporating Behavioral Theory in OM Empirical Models.”)
- Hays, Julie M., and Arthur V. Hill (2001). “A Longitudinal Empirical Study of the Effect of a Service Guarantee on Service Quality,” Production and Operations Management, 10 (4), 405-423.
- Hill, Arthur V. (2002). “Five challenges for the operations management research community,” Journal of Operations Management, invited lead article, 20 (1), 6-8.
- Hill, Arthur V., David A. Collier, Craig M. Froehle, John C. Goodale, Richard D. Metters, and Rohit Verma (2002). “Research Opportunities in Service Design Research,” Special Issue on Service Process Design, Journal of Operations Management.
- Hays, Julie M., and Arthur V. Hill (2006). “An Extended Longitudinal Study of the Effects of a Service Guarantee,” Production and Operations Management, 15 (1), 117-131.
- Chen, Xinlei, George John, Julie M. Hays, Arthur V. Hill, and Susan E. Geurs (2009). “Learning from a Service Guarantee Quasi-Experiment,” Journal of Marketing Research, 11, 322-343.
