= Jane King =

Jane King may refer to:

- Jane King (poet) (born 1952), St. Lucian poet
- Jane King (journalist) (born 1968), American journalist
