= Ting Zhu (academic) =

Marketing academic

Ting Zhu is a Chinese marketing academic who is the Jack A. Hockema Chair in Business at Purdue University Daniels School of Business. Before joining the faculty at Purdue University in 2016, she was an associate professor of marketing at the University of British Columbia from 2014 to 2016.

== Life ==
Zhu received a B.S. in Management Information Systems from Tsinghua University in 1997, followed by an M.S. in Business Administration from the same institution in 1999. She then earned an M.S.I.A. in Marketing from Carnegie Mellon University, in 2002, and a Ph.D. in Marketing from Carnegie Mellon University in 2006.

Zhu's teaching focuses on topics such as new product management, marketing analysis, consumer behavior, customer relationship management, and pricing. Her research examines entry models, consumer choice, retail competition, pricing strategies, the adoption of new technologies, and issues related to health and sustainability in marketing.

Zhu served as lecturer of marketing at Tsinghua University from 1999 to 2000. From 2006 to 2012, she was assistant professor of marketing at the University of Chicago Booth School of Business. She then joined the UBC Sauder School of Business as assistant professor of marketing from 2012 to 2014 and associate professor of marketing with tenure from 2014 to 2016.

In 2016, Zhu moved to Purdue University Daniels School of Business as associate professor of marketing with tenure from 2016 to 2021. Since 2021, she has been professor of marketing and holds the endowed Jack A. Hockema Chair in Management at the same school.

From September to October 2023, Zhu was DLA Piper Visiting Professor at the Johns Hopkins Carey Business School.
