= An An (giant panda) =

Male giant panda (1986–2022)

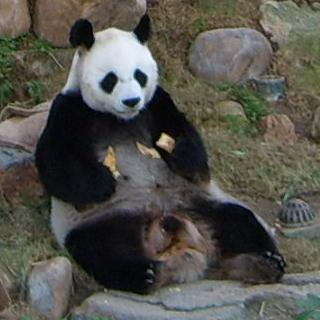
- An An in 2004
- Species: Giant panda
- Sex: Male
- Born: August 1986; Wolong National Nature Reserve, Sichuan, China
- Died: 21 July 2022 (aged 35); Ocean Park, Hong Kong

An An (Chinese: 安安; pinyin: Ān Ān; lit. 'Peace peace'; August 1986 – 21 July 2022) was a male giant panda who resided at Ocean Park Hong Kong. He was a gift from the Central People's Government of China to the Hong Kong Special Administrative Region in 1999. At the time of his death, he was the world's longest-living male giant panda in human care.

== Biography ==
An An was born in August 1986 at the Wolong National Nature Reserve in Sichuan, China. He was transferred to Ocean Park in March 1999, alongside the female panda Jia Jia, as a diplomatic gift from the Chinese government to mark the second anniversary of Hong Kong's return to China.

In 2017, An An became the world's oldest living male giant panda in captivity at age 31. After Jia Jia's death in 2016, An An continued to live at Ocean Park.

In his final weeks, An An's health declined significantly. He became lethargic and stopped eating solid food. An An was euthanised on 21 July 2022 at the age of 36—equivalent to about 144 human years.

== See also ==
- List of individual giant pandas
- List of individual bears

Honorary titles
Preceded by Basi	Oldest living giant panda 13 September 2017 – 21 July 2022	Succeeded by Shuan Shuan
