= George W. Huber =

American chemical engineer

- Born: 1974 (age 51–52); La Jolla, California, U.S.
- Education: University of Wisconsin; Brigham Young University
- Known for: Reaction Engineering, Process Engineering
- Awards: Camille Dreyfus Teacher Scholar (2011)
- Scientific career
- Fields: Chemical Engineering
- Workplaces: University of Massachusetts; University of Wisconsin
- Doctoral advisor: James Dumesic

George W. Huber is an American chemical engineer. He is the Richard L. Antoine Professor of Chemical Engineering at the University of Wisconsin- Madison. His research focus is on developing new catalytic processes for the production of renewable liquid fuels and chemicals.

== Career ==
In 2015 Thomson Reuters has listed George as a “highly cited researcher” which indicates that he is “one of the “world’s most influential scientific minds” who rank in the top 1% most cited. He has authored over 100 peer-reviewed publications including three publications in Science and has over 10 patents. He has received several awards including the NSF CAREER award, the Dreyfus Teacher-Scholar award, fellow of the Royal Society of Chemistry, and the outstanding young faculty award (2010) by the college of engineering at UMass-Amherst. He has been named one of the top 100 people in bioenergy by Biofuels Digest for the past 4 years. He is co-founder of Anellotech (www.anellotech.com) a biochemical company focused on commercializing, catalytic fast pyrolysis, a technology to produce renewable aromatics from biomass. George serves on the editorial board of Energy and Environmental Science, ChemCatChem, Energy Technology, and The Catalyst Review. In June 2007, he chaired a NSF and DOE funded workshop entitled: Breaking the Chemical and Engineering Barriers to Lignocellulosic Biofuels (www.ecs.umass.edu/biofuels). In summer of 2015, George did a sabbatical visit with Professor Tao Zhang at Dalian Institute of Chemical Physics. George did a post-doctoral stay with Avelino Corma at the Technical Chemical Institute at the Polytechnical University of Valencia, Spain (UPV-CSIC). He obtained his Ph.D. in chemical engineering from University of Wisconsin-Madison (2005). He obtained his B.S. (1999) and M.S.(2000) degrees in chemical engineering from Brigham Young University. Huber is a Latter-day Saint. The July 2009 issue of Scientific American included an article on the potential of grassoline by Huber and Bruce E. Dale.

== Sources ==
- NSF article on the work of Huber and others towards plant based fuel
- UMass bio of Huber
- Huber's and Dale's Scientific American article
- Mormon Times Dec. 2, 2009 article on Huber's work
