= Dale Skeen =

American computer scientist

M. Dale Skeen (born c. 1953) is an American computer scientist. He specializes in designing and implementing large-scale computing systems, distributed computing and database management systems.

== Life ==
Skeen earned a B.S. in computer science from North Carolina State University in 1978 and a Ph.D. in Computer Science in 1982 from the University of California, Berkeley in distributed database systems.

He began his career in 1982 at the Computer Corporation of America in Cambridge, Massachusetts, before working as an assistant professor at Cornell University’s Computer Science department, during which he also worked as a technical consultant for Bell Laboratories. Skeen then held a research staff member position at the IBM Almaden Research Center in San Jose, California.

In 1986, Skeen worked at TIBCO Software in Palo Alto, California, becoming the vice president of research and principal inventor of “The Information Bus” data integration backplane.

Skeen co-founded Vitria Technology in October 1994 with his wife, JoMei Chang, and served as chief technology officer. Vitria started as a business process management company and then developed operational intelligence products. Skeen was interviewed in the press.

He has patents on the distributed publish/subscribe communication mechanism and three-phase commit protocol. Skeen received the Distinguished Alumnus Award from the University of California, Berkeley in May 2001 for “fundamental contributions in publish-subscribe communications.”

In April 2004 he became chief executive officer of Vitria.

== Publications ==
- "Business Vocabulary Management,” Business Integration Journal, July 2003.
- “Real-Time Queries in the Enterprise,” Byte Magazine, Volume 23, Number 2, February 1998.
- “Enabling the Real-Time Enterprise,” Byte Magazine, Volume 23, Number 1, January 1998.
- “The Information Bus – An Architecture for Extensible Distributed Systems,” Proceedings of the 14th ACM Symposium on Operating Systems Principles, ACM Press, Asheville, North Carolina, December 1993. With M. Pfluegl, B. Oki, A. Siegel.
- “An Efficient, Fault-Tolerant Protocol for Replication Management,” Fault-Tolerant Distributed Computing, B. Simmons and A. Spector, editors, Springer-Verlag, 1990. With A. El Abbadi and F. Cristian.
- “Nonblocking Commit Protocols,” The INGRES Papers, M. Stonebreaker, editor, Addison-Wesley, 1986.
- “A Formal Model for Crash Recovery in a Distributed System,” Concurrency and Reliability in Distributed Systems, B. Bhargava, ed., Van Nostrand-Reingold, Inc., 1987. With M. Stonebraker.
- “Consistency in a Partitioned Network: A Survey,” ACM Computing Surveys 17, No. 3, September 1985, pp. 341–370. With S. Davidson and H. Garcia-Molina.
- “Determining the Last Process to Fail,” ACM Transactions on Computing Systems 2, No. 1, February 1985.
- “Increasing Availability in Partitioned Database Systems,” Advances in Computing Research 3: The Theory of Databases, Franco Preparato and Paris Kanellakis, editors, JAI Press, Inc., 1986. With D. Wright.
- “Achieving High Availability in Partitioned Database Systems,” IEEE Database Engineering 8, June 1985.
- “Crash Recovery in a Distributed System,” IEEE Transactions on Software Engineering SE-9, 3 (May 1983), 219–228. With M. Stonebraker.
- “Increasing Availability in a Partitioned Network,” Proceedings of the Third ACM Symposium on the Principles of Database Systems, Waterloo, Canada, March 1984. With D. Wright.
- “A Recovery Algorithm for a Distributed Database System,” Proceedings of the Second ACM Symposium on the Principles of Database Systems, Atlanta, Georgia, March 1983, 8-15. With N. Goodman, et al.
- “Quorum-Based Commit Protocols,” Proceedings of the 6th Berkeley Workshop on Distributed Data Management and Networking, Pacific Grove, California, February 1982. (Reprinted in Distributed Database Management, J. Larson and S.K. Rahimi (eds.), IEEE Computer Society Press.)
- “A Decentralized Termination Protocol,” Proceedings of the Symposium on Reliability in Distributed Software and Database System, Pittsburgh, Pennsylvania, July 1981, 27–32.
