= Jia Jia (giant panda) =

Oldest giant panda in captivity (1978–2016)

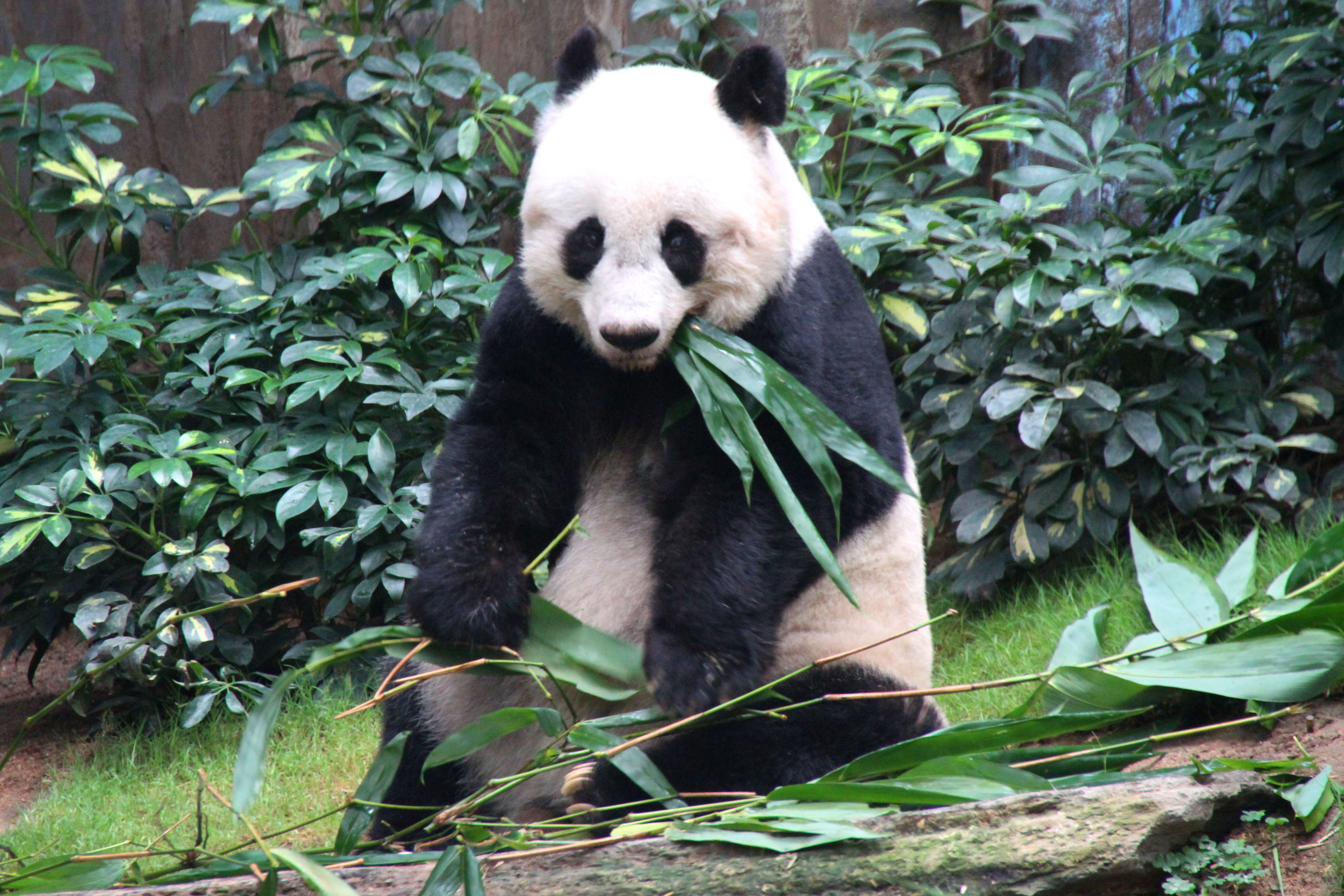
- Jia Jia in 2012
- Species: Giant panda
- Sex: Female
- Born: 28 July 1978; Qionglai Mountains, Sichuan, China
- Died: 16 October 2016 (aged 38); Ocean Park Hong Kong
- Known for: Being the oldest giant panda in captivity
- Offspring: 6
- Weight: 67 kg (148 lb) (before death)

Jia Jia (Note: Chinese: 佳佳; lit. 'Good') (28 July 1978 – 16 October 2016) was a female giant panda who, alongside An An, lived in Wolong National Nature Reserve until March 1999, when they were moved to Ocean Park Hong Kong to promote conservation and ecology. Following a series of health complications in October 2016, Ocean Park euthanized her. At age 38, Jia Jia was the oldest giant panda in captivity. She had six offspring, 13 grandchildren and two great-grandchildren.

== Life ==
Jia Jia was born in the Qionglai Mountains in Sichuan, China, on 28 July 1978, and was rescued in Qingchuan County around the age of two. She and An An were housed in Wolong National Nature Reserve before being transferred to Ocean Park Hong Kong in March 1999, as a gesture to the territory following the British handover.

Before moving to Ocean Park Hong Kong, Jia Jia had given birth to six offspring, including Guo Guo, who lives in mainland China. She also had 13 grandchildren and two great-grandchildren. During the 17 years she was at Ocean Park, Jia Jia promoted ecology and conservation. According to Ocean Park, Jia Jia was more reserved than An An, and enjoyed napping for four to five hours a day. Her and An An's habitat, the Panda Pavilion, cost HK$80 million to build and was made to withstand the humid climate of Hong Kong. The Panda Pavilion attracted approximately 1.6 million annual visitors. In April 2004, Ocean Park held a "Giant Panda Cuddle Party" (亲亲大熊猫派对; Qīn qīn dà xióngmāo pàiduì) where visitors could see Jia Jia and An An up close. The event featured authentic Sichuan cuisine and was sponsored by Toys "R" Us. In 2015, for Jia Jia's 37th birthday, Ocean Park celebrated by giving her an "ice cake" with an apple inside, topped with grenadine and mint syrup. The staff ate a panda-shaped ice cream cake. Representatives from Guinness World Records were on site, awarding her the record for the "oldest giant panda living in captivity". The previous record holder was Du Du, who was 36 years old.

== Later life, health and death ==
By her 37th birthday, Jia Jia had high blood pressure, arthritis, and cataracts. In October 2016, Jia Jia's health deteriorated further; her food intake dropped from over 10 kilograms (22 lb) to less than 3 kilograms (6.6 lb), and her weight had gone down to 67 kilograms (148 lb). The amount of food she ate decreased from 10 kilograms (22 lb) a day to 2.9 kilograms (6.4 lb). She died on October 16, 2016, at age 38, making her the oldest giant panda in captivity. She was euthanized by Ocean Park, who announced on November 2, 2016, that they would use her skull, teeth and fur for histopathological research purposes. Leo Kung Lin-cheng, Ocean Park's chairmen, said that "Jia Jia was a member of our family who had spent 17 wonderful years with Hong Kong people, and she will be deeply missed". On December 16, 2016, Ocean Park held a burial ceremony and scattered her ashes. A ginkgo, which symbolizes longevity, was planted near her former residence.

== See also ==
- List of individual giant pandas
- List of individual bears

== Notes ==
Honorary titles
Preceded by Ming Ming	Oldest living giant panda 7 May 2011 – 16 October 2016	Succeeded by Basi
