= Basi (giant panda) =

Female giant panda (1980–2017)

Basi 巴斯
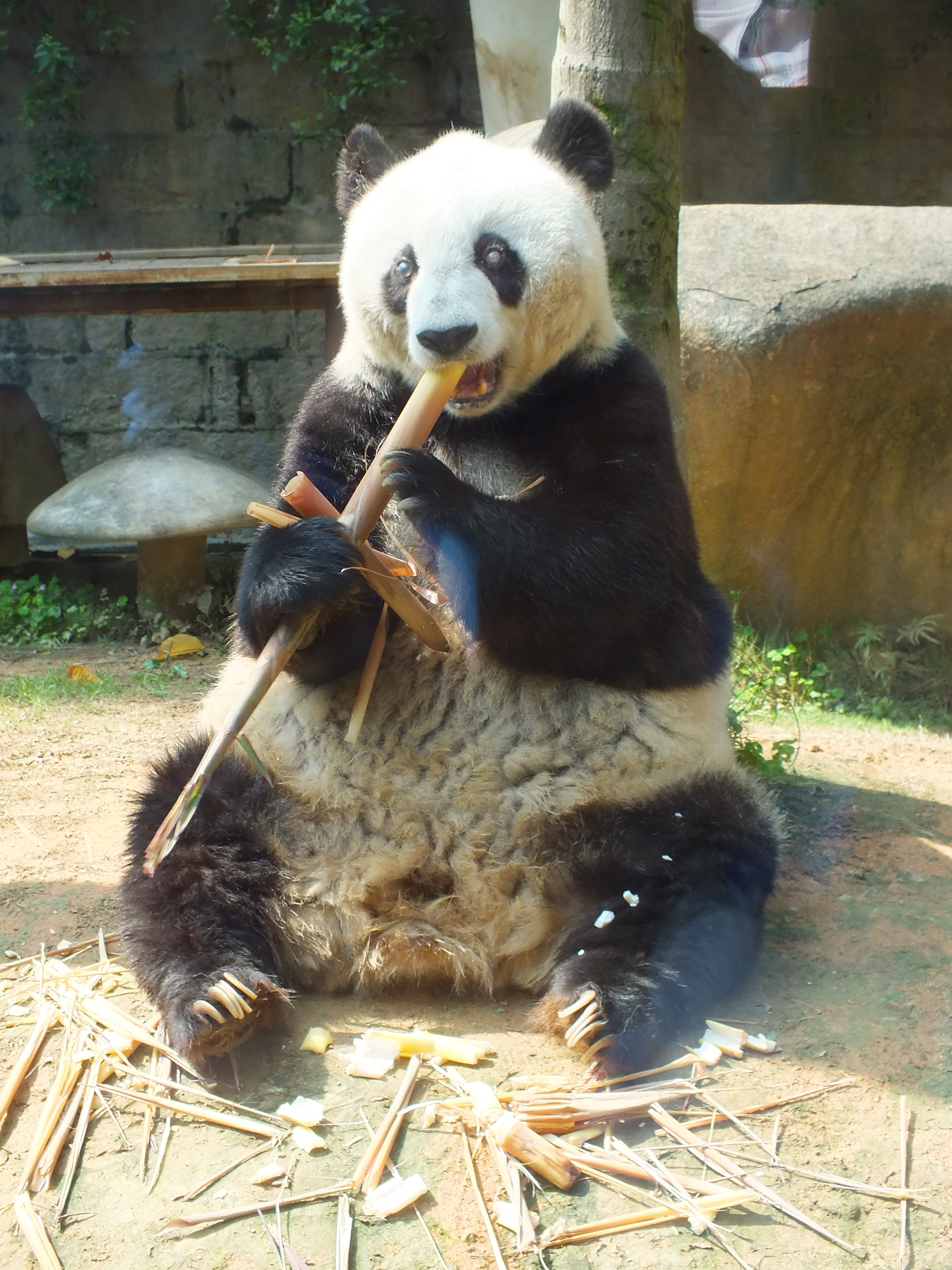
- Basi eating bamboo in 2012
- Species: Giant panda
- Sex: Female
- Born: c. 1980; Baoxing County, Sichuan, China
- Died: September 13, 2017 (aged 37); Straits Giant Panda Research and Exchange Center, Fuzhou, Fujian, China
- Resting place: "Basi Museum"
- Known for: Performing tricks Being the inspiration for Pan Pan, the mascot of the 1990 Asian Games
- Tricks: Weightlifting; Cycling; Slam dunking a ball into a hoop; Baton twirling; Balancing
- Residence: San Diego Zoo; Fuzhou
- Mate: Yuan Yuan
- Weight: approx. 200 lb
- Named after: Basi Creek

Basi (Note: Chinese: 巴斯; pinyin: Bāsī; trans. "Nice") (c. 1980 – September 13, 2017) was a female giant panda. She was found unconscious and near starvation in 1984 during a bamboo blossoming and named after Basi Creek, where local farmers found her. After recovering in Sichuan for six months, she was sent to the Straits Giant Panda Research and Exchange Center—better known as Fuzhou Panda World—in 1985 to take part in a breeding program. She did not have any offspring.

As an act of panda diplomacy, Basi and another panda, Yuan Yuan, were sent to the San Diego Zoo, where they lived for 200 days. She performed tricks such as weightlifting and baton twirling and attracted 2.5 million visitors. Her athletic performances gained the attention of the Asian Games, which used her as the inspiration for "Pan Pan", the mascot for the 1990 Asian Games. Basi also performed at the 1991 Spring Festival Gala in China. She lived in Fuzhou for approximately 33 years.

Basi's later life was marked by multiple ailments beginning in 1997. She was the first panda to be diagnosed with high blood pressure and undergo cataract surgery. She was reportedly in good condition during her 37th birthday celebration, but she developed cirrhosis and kidney failure in June 2017. Basi died on September 13, 2017, at age 37, from those illnesses, and she was the oldest living panda in captivity. The following day, Fuzhou Panda World broadcast a memorial service for her.

Basi has been described by Chinese media as a symbol of friendship and peace. A stone statue was built in her honor in 2015, and Fuzhou Panda World awarded one of her trainers, Georgeanne Irvine, the "Order of Basi". Her body was planned to be preserved in the eponymous "Basi Museum", and in 2024, the Basi Public Welfare Alliance was founded in her name.

== Early life ==
Basi was born c. 1980 in Baoxing County, Sichuan. According to Chinese-language sources, local farmers found her unconscious on February 22, 1984, in Basi Creek (Note: 巴斯溝; Bā sī gōu) in the Qionglai Mountains, and she was named after the creek. She was estimated to have been four or five years old when she fell, and was on the brink of starvation due to the ongoing bamboo blossoming in Sichuan, which started the year prior to her rescue.

Basi was nursed back to health at the Wolong National Nature Reserve in Sichuan for six months. Chen Yucun, the director of the Straits Giant Panda Research and Exchange Center—better known as Fuzhou Panda World—told West China City Daily that the center contacted the Ministry of Forestry in May 1984 to acquire her. After the center made two unsuccessful attempts to send a deputy director to Sichuan, Li Xingyu, one of the farmers who rescued Basi, recalled Chen playing music outside Wolong. Noticing her reaction, Chen believed she could be trained. In 1985, Basi was sent to Fuzhou Panda World in Fuzhou, Fujian, to participate in a panda breeding program and learn tricks. Basi did not have any offspring. Chen took care of her during her time in Fuzhou.

== San Diego Zoo and performances ==
In 1987, Basi and a male panda, Yuan Yuan, were sent to the San Diego Zoo as an act of panda diplomacy, which aims to promote animal conservation abroad. The arrangement took the San Diego Zoo officials and the Chinese government over eight years to negotiate, and their arrival in July 1987 marked the first time pandas had been seen in San Diego. The pair were exhibited in separate enclosures for 200 days and attracted 2.5 million visitors. Lines exceeded 7 km (4.3 mi), and after a five-hour wait, visitors saw Basi for three minutes at a time. The two pandas left the San Diego Zoo on February 9, 1988.

In her youth, Basi could lift weights, slam dunk a ball into a hoop, ride a bicycle, and twirl a baton while balancing on a wooden seesaw. The Asian Games noticed these abilities, which led to her becoming the inspiration for "Pan Pan", (Note: 盼盼; Pàn pàn) the mascot for the 1990 Asian Games. She performed at the 1991 Spring Festival Gala, which was staged by China Central Television (CCTV). She lived at Fuzhou Panda World for roughly 33 years.

== Later life ==
Basi's health began declining in 1997, when she developed a cataract in her right eye, nearly blinding her. In 2000, she developed a vascular rupture and acute enteritis, among other illnesses, and in 2001 she became the first panda diagnosed with high blood pressure. She was also the first panda to undergo cataract surgery, having done so in April 2002. She had epilepsy for over ten years.

In 2015, Fuzhou Panda World celebrated Basi's 35th birthday by awarding the "Order of Basi" (Note: 巴斯勋章; Bā sī xūnzhāng) to Georgeanne Irvine, one of her trainers from the San Diego Zoo. A stone statue was also erected in her honor. For her 37th birthday, Basi wore a tiara and ate from a cake-shaped bowl. Her keepers and CCTV said she was doing well, though she could only eat bamboo leaves and liquids. According to Xinhua News Agency and Chen, she slept for 21 hours a day and she still performed tricks at 37 but for less than an hour a day. In June 2017, she developed cirrhosis and kidney failure.

== Death and legacy ==
Basi died on September 13, 2017, at 8:50 am, at Fuzhou Panda World, from liver cirrhosis and kidney failure, among other illnesses. Prior to her death, zookeepers at Fuzhou Panda World tried resuscitating her. At the age of 37, she was over 100 in human years. (Note: Sources disagree on the exact number. It has been suggested that Basi's age of 37 years old translates to 108, 114, or 140 human years.) Following Jia Jia's death in 2016 at age 38, Basi was the oldest living panda in captivity. Fuzhou Panda World broadcast a memorial service on September 14, 2017, with yellow flowers placed around her body. According to Xinhua News Agency, her body was planned to be preserved at the "Basi Museum",

Basi has been viewed as a symbol of peace and friendship across China. This reputation led to the Basi Public Welfare Alliance (Note: 巴斯公益联盟; Bā sī gōngyì liánméng) being founded on December 5, 2024. Pan Pan's name was used for Fujian's provincial brand, Pan Pan Food. (Note: 盼盼食品; Pàn pàn shípǐn) Researchers attributed Basi's longevity to her captivity in Fuzhou, which differs from the pandas' natural habitats in Sichuan and Shaanxi.

== See also ==
- List of individual giant pandas
- List of individual bears

== Bibliography ==
- Irvine, Georgeanne (1991). The Visit of Two Giant Pandas at the San Diego Zoo. Simon & Schuster Books for Young Readers.

Honorary titles
Preceded by Jia Jia	Oldest living giant panda 16 October 2016 – 13 September 2017	Succeeded by An An
