= Eugene Houdry =

French mechanical engineer (1892–1962)

Eugène Jules Houdry
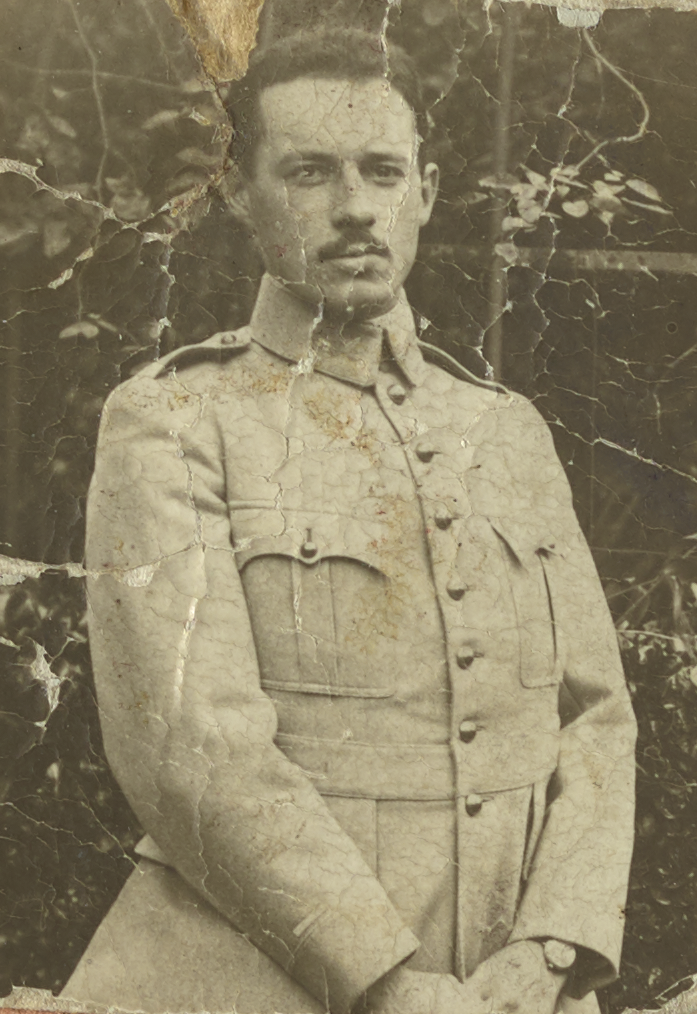
- Eugene Houdry, 1919
- Born: April 18, 1892; Domont, France
- Died: July 18, 1962 (aged 70); Upper Darby Township, Pennsylvania
- Education: École Nationale Supérieure d'Arts et Métiers in Chalons-sur-Marne
- Known for: Catalytic cracking
- Awards: Croix de Guerre, Chevalier of the Legion of Honor, Perkin Medal
- Scientific career
- Fields: Engineering
- Workplaces: Socony Vacuum, Sun Oil, Oxy-Catalyst

Eugène Jules Houdry (Domont, France, April 18, 1892 – Upper Darby Township, Pennsylvania, July 18, 1962) was a mechanical engineer who graduated from École Nationale Supérieure d'Arts et Métiers in 1911.

Houdry served as a lieutenant in a tank company in the French Army during World War One, receiving the French Legion of Honour. He helped innovate catalytic cracking of petroleum feed stocks, for which he received the Perkin Medal among others.

== Life ==
Eugene Jules Houdry was born on April 18, 1892, at Domont, France near Paris. His parents were Jules Houdry and Émilie Thias Jule Lemaire. His father owned a successful business that manufactured structural steel.

Houdry studied mechanical engineering at the École des arts et métiers in the Paris suburb of Chalons-sur-Marne. He graduated first in his class in 1911, earning a gold medal from the French government as the highest-ranking scholar in his class. He also captained his school's soccer team, winning the national championship of France in 1910. After graduation, Houdry joined his father's steel-making business as an engineer.

=== World War I ===
During World War I, Houdry served in the French army, first as a lieutenant in the field artillery. He later transferred to the army's new tank corps and took part in the first French battle to use tanks, part of the Nivelle Offensive which began on April 16, 1917. Houdry was seriously wounded in the Juvincourt sector during the Second Battle of the Aisne. Most of the French tanks used in this offensive were rendered inoperable and very few reached their objective. Houdry was injured while trying to organize repairs to the damaged tanks under heavy fire. He was later awarded the Croix de Guerre and was made a Chevalier of the Legion of Honor.

=== Between the wars ===
After the war, Houdry returned to his father's company, Houdry et Fils. His hobby was road racing, and he drove a Bugatti racing car. Through the family steel company, he met automobile and parts manufacturers, and engineers who were trying to improve engine performance. This sparked Houdry's interest in high-performance fuels. Recognizing that the key to better performance of automobiles and airplanes was the improvement of fuels, he became interested in the catalytic processes used to convert coal and lignite to gasoline. In 1922, Houdry visited the United States, where he saw the Indianapolis 500, and toured a Ford Motor plant in Detroit, Michigan.

On July 3, 1922, Eugene Houdry married Geneviève Marie Quilleret. The couple were to have two sons, Jacques and Pierre.

Following the war, there was an increasing demand for motor fuel. It was feared that petroleum stocks, which were being processed using thermal cracking, would not meet the demand. Scientists sought new ways to produce liquid fuels from bitumen, coal, and lignite. In Italy, a French pharmacist named E. A. Prudhomme was the principal scientist of a group experimenting with promising techniques for water-gas synthesis.

In 1920 Houdry had established a manufacturing company for steel springs and chains, the Manufacture Générale des Ressorts (M.G.R.), in Beauchamp, Seine-et-Oise. In 1922, Houdry convinced Prudhomme to join him at Beauchamp and set up a fuel research laboratory under Houdry's management. In 1924 Houdry incorporated the Société Anonyme Française pour la Fabrication d'Essences et Pétroles. By 1927, they had developed a 3-step process for a lignite-based fuel, using desulfurizing and catalysts for cracking.

"During the lignite-to-gasoline process, the solid lignite was initially broken down by heat to produce viscous hydrocarbon oil and tars, then the oil was further converted by an added catalyst to produce lower-boiling hydrocarbons similar to the gasoline fraction derived from petroleum."

A major problem with Prudhomme's process was that the catalysts could not be reclaimed. The surface of the catalyst quickly became coated with a layer of carbon or coke and became less effective. There was already some work in this problem, e. g. in a 1917 patent alumina was suggested as a catalyst for oil cracking. By 1927, having tested hundreds of catalysts, Houdry had focused on naturally occurring Fuller's earth. He determined that it could be processed to obtain a purer aluminosilicate catalyst, which could be successfully regenerated under certain conditions.

By 1927 Houdry was able to get initial support from the French government to build a pilot gas plant in Saint-Julien-de-Peyrolas. It began production in June 1929, and ceased production in 1930. Although the process was successfully demonstrated, it was expensive and yields were lower than predicted. Houdry was unable to get ongoing support from the French government or from French companies to produce the new fuel. Approaches to the French Saint-Gobain Company and the Anglo-Iranian Oil Company were unsuccessful.

=== Moving to America ===
Unable to get backing for new fuels in France, Houdry turned to the United States, where his efforts were more successful. Houdry moved from France to America in 1930. He settled in Paulsboro, New Jersey, where he formed the Houdry Process Corporation in 1931.

As discussed in more detail below (See Inventions), Houdry worked with the American oil companies, Socony Vacuum and Sun Oil to develop pilot plants for improved fuels. The first full-scale "Houdry unit" was opened in Marcus Hook in 1937. By 1942, 14 Houdry fixed-bed catalytic units were producing high-octane aviation fuel for the armed forces.

=== World War II activities ===
During World War II, Houdry strongly opposed the government of Vichy France under Marshal Philippe Pétain and its collaboration with Germany. As president of the U.S. chapter of France Forever (where his brother-in-law, Pierre Quilleret, was also one of the founders), Houdry vocally and publicly criticized Petain, stating that he did not speak for the French people. Houdry supported General Charles de Gaulle, leader of the provisional French government in exile.

On May 3, 1941, the Vichy government revoked Houdry's French citizenship. In January 1942, Houdry was granted citizenship in the United States.

Both of Houdry's sons, Jacques and Pierre, served in World War II as part of the United States Army. Pierre served in field artillery and chemical warfare units. Eugene Houdry supported the war effort through the development of industrial processes and fuels.

== Inventions ==
=== Coal to gasoline ===
Houdry originally focused on using lignite (brown coal) as a feedstock, but switched to using heavy liquid tars. Although others had experimented with catalysts for this purpose, they were stymied by the fact that the catalyst ceased to work after a time. Houdry diagnosed the nature of the problem and developed a method to regenerate the catalyst.

The first Houdry unit was built at Sun Oil's Marcus Hook, PA oil refinery in 1937. Many more units were built by the 1940s and were instrumental for US wartime aviation gasoline production. Among others at the company who helped Houdry in the development of the catalytic cracking process was Alex Golden Oblad.

The process was further developed by two MIT engineers, Warren K. Lewis and Edwin R. Gilliland, under contract to Standard Oil of New Jersey, now ExxonMobil. They developed the process into fluid catalytic cracking, which solved the problem of having to shut down the process to burn the coke off the catalyst by using a continuously circulating fluidized catalyst made of a fine zeolite powder. This process is still in widespread use, especially in the US where gasoline is in high demand compared to other refined products.

Houdry later became interested in automotive catalysts, and the catalytic converter was one of approximately 100 patents that he received, but nothing came of it until the 1970s because the tetraethyl lead that was still in use in the 1950s and 1960s poisoned the catalyst.

=== Butadiene ===
Houdry also invented a catalytic process to produce butadiene from butane gas, which was formed during crude oil production. During World War II, butadiene was important to the production of synthetic rubber.

=== Oxy-Catalyst ===
Houdry Auto Catalyst Patent 2742437

Following World War II, Houdry started the Oxy-Catalyst Company. Houdry was concerned with possible health risks relating to automobile and industrial air pollution. He built a generic catalytic converter capable of reducing carbon monoxide and unburned hydrocarbons from automobile exhausts. For his design, he received U.S. Patent 2,742,437 in 1956. Catalytic converters eventually became standard equipment in American cars, following passage of the Clean Air Act, introduced by Edmund S. Muskie in 1970.

== Scientific recognition ==
Houdry's contributions to catalytic technology were recognized by numerous awards, including the Potts Medal of the Franklin Institute in 1948, the Perkin Medal of the Society of Chemical Industry (American Section) in 1959, the E. V. Murphree Award in Industrial and Engineering Chemistry of the American Chemical Society in 1962, and posthumous election to the National Inventors Hall of Fame in 1990.

He was awarded honorary degrees from Pennsylvania Military College (Doctor of Science) in 1940 and Grove City College in 1943. In 1967, the North American Catalysis Society created the Eugene J. Houdry Award in Applied Catalysis, awarded in odd numbered years since 1971, to "recognize and encourage individual contributions in the field of catalysis with emphasis on the development of new and improved catalysts and processes representing outstanding advances in their useful application".

On April 13, 1996, Houdry's work was recognized by the designation of a National Historic Chemical Landmark by the American Chemical Society at the site of the Sun Company (now Sunoco Logistics Partners L.P.) in Marcus Hook, Pennsylvania.

== Death ==
Houdry died on July 18, 1962, at Upper Darby Township, Pennsylvania at the age of 70. He was survived by his sons and his wife, Genevieve Quilleret.
