= Gavin Mikhail =

American composer, pianist and singer-songwriter (born 1975)

- Mikhail in 2007

Background information
- Born: March 26, 1975 (age 51); West Lafayette, Indiana, U.S.
- Origin: Nashville, Tennessee, U.S.
- Genres: Pop; rock
- Occupations: Composer; pianist; singer-songwriter
- Years active: Since 1997; 29 years ago
- Label: Tower Window Records
- Website: Official website

Gavin Mikhail (born March 26, 1975) is an American composer, pianist and singer-songwriter from Nashville, Tennessee.

The winner of the 2007 "Lay It Down and Mix It Up in the UK" fan-vote contest, he has released more than 30 albums and singles independently. Mikhail also composed the piano soundtrack to Ruta Sepetys' New York Times bestseller Between Shades of Gray which was released in 2011.

== Early life and education ==
Mikhail was born in West Lafayette, Indiana. Coming from a family where much emphasis was placed on the arts, Mikhail began studying classical piano and pipe organ by age seven and began performing at weekly church services by age ten. He graduated from West Lafayette High School in 1991.

Turning his attention to mainstream music, Mikhail spent the next four years at Purdue University, in West Lafayette, performing in bands as lead vocalist and keyboardist while pursuing a degree in finance. Graduating in 1995, he moved to Nashville to begin a career in the music industry.

== Giant Records and independent songwriting (1997–2001) ==
In 1997, after a year of part-time work at various music companies, Mikhail began working at Giant Records, the label started by Irving Azoff. Originally hired into the finance department, Mikhail transferred to a position on the artists and repertoire (A&R) staff within four months. Throughout the next two years in his A&R role, Mikhail assisted in the signings and promotion of acts including Blake Shelton, Clay Walker, Daryle Singletary, The Wilkinsons and Georgia Middleman.

Leaving Giant at the end of 1998 to pursue songwriting and production, he spent several years working with independent artists and began to focus more heavily on his own writing and solo artist career.

== Solo career (since 2002) ==
Mikhail completed his first self-produced demos in early 2002, a number of which would later appear on his debut album My Personal Beauty Needs. In 2003, Mikhail released the album independently and immediately began work on his follow-up album Like Normal People Do.

In 2007, Mikhail signed a licensing deal with Trolley Bus Records to distribute Like Normal People Do to HMV and Tower Records stores in Japan. Winning the "Lay It Down and Mix It Up in the UK" fan-vote contest sponsored by Eventful, Tunecore, and Solid State Logic in October of that year, he traveled to Peter Gabriel's Real World Studios in England to record.

In early 2008, Mikhail was featured as an "internet sensation" by Billboard magazine in its "Underground" video series and later that year was invited to perform alongside Matt Wertz, Matthew Perryman Jones, and Jeremy Lister for the Nashville Songwriters Association International Tin Pan South Songwriters Festival in Nashville.

The Real World Sessions: Volume I, Mikhail's first album from the trip to Real World Studios, was released in April 2009. The album includes his piano-based cover of alternative-rock band Death Cab for Cutie's song "I Will Follow You into the Dark". The song and associated video later went on to become a YouTube hit and was viewed over one million times.

In 2011, Mikhail's friend Ruta Sepetys asked him to compose an original piano soundtrack to her New York Times bestselling novel Between Shades of Gray, which Mikhail released in 2011.

== Discography ==
- My Personal Beauty Needs (2003, Tower Window Records)
- Like Normal People Do (2006, Tower Window Records)
- The Real World Sessions: Volume I (2009, Tower Window Records)
- Between Shades of Gray Soundtrack (2010, Tower Window Records)
- Some Die Young (May 23, 2012, Tower Window Records)

== See also ==
- List of American composers
- List of people from Indiana
- List of people from Nashville, Tennessee
- List of pop and rock pianists
- List of Purdue University people
- List of singer-songwriters
- Music of Indiana
- Music of Tennessee
