= Stephen C. Smith (sociologist) =

American professor

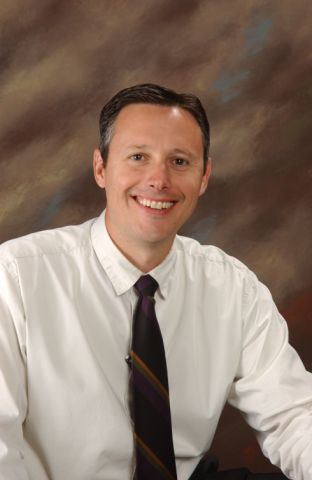
Stephen Smith at BYU-I

Stephen C. Smith is an American professor currently employed as faculty at BYU-Idaho in the Sociology and Social Work Department. A social and religious theorist, he is an outspoken academic on a number of topics that traverse religion, economics, and sociology.

== Education ==
Smith has a Ph.D. in Family Studies from Purdue University, an M.S. in Marriage and Family Therapy from Northern Illinois University, and a B.S. in Psychology from Brigham Young University.

Smith spent a large amount of time working with the ANASAZI Foundation, an outdoor behavioral health program, helping troubled youth prior to teaching sociology.

== Publications ==
Smith has been involved with publications involving modern social issues as seen from contemporary perspectives. In 2001, he was jointly credited for publishing on the relationship between families and work especially in the 21st century. The work on the emerging sociological issues appeared in Minding the time in family experience: Emerging perspectives and issues (2001). His 2000 publication, The Meaning of Time for Reduced-load Workers and Their Families, on the relationship between working time and the meaning of time amongst families in the workforce was published by John Wiley & Sons. The research also explores the effects on gender roles, and shows that the social institutions of work and family are currently in flux.

In addition to John Wiley & Sons, Smith's research has been published by Purdue University.

Smith gave the keynote address at the BYU-Idaho faculty conference in Fall 2011, entitled “The Liberal Arts and Magical Teaching.”

== See also ==
- Working time: Social Impact
- List of Notable Purdue University people: Professors
- Time management: Conceptual Effect on Labor
- Wilderness therapy - ANASAZI Foundation
