= WLFI-TV =

Television station in Lafayette, Indiana

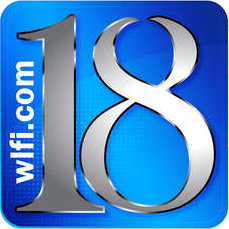

- Lafayette, Indiana; United States
- Channels: Digital: 11 (VHF); Virtual: 18
- Branding: WLFI 18; News 18; Lafayette's CW18.2

Programming
- Affiliations: 18.1: CBS; 18.2: CW+; for others, see § Subchannels

Ownership
- Owner: Gray Media; (Gray Television Licensee, LLC)

History
- First air date: June 15, 1953
- Former call signs: WFAM-TV (1953–1967)
- Former channel number: Analog: 59 (UHF, 1953–1957), 18 (UHF, 1957–2009)
- Former affiliations: DuMont (secondary, 1953–1956); NTA (secondary, 1956–1961)
- Call sign meaning: Lafayette, Indiana

Technical information
- Licensing authority: FCC
- Facility ID: 73204
- ERP: 30 kW
- HAAT: 214 m (702 ft)
- Transmitter coordinates: 40°23′20″N 86°36′46″W

Links
- Public license information: Public file; LMS
- Website: www.wlfi.com; WLFI-DT2

WLFI-TV (channel 18) is a television station in Lafayette, Indiana, United States, affiliated with CBS and The CW Plus. Owned by Gray Media, the station maintains studios on Yeager Road in West Lafayette; its transmitter is located on County Road 700 in rural northwestern Clinton County (southwest of Rossville).

== History ==
The station first signed on the air at 6 p.m. on June 15, 1953, as WFAM-TV, broadcasting on UHF channel 59. It was founded by O.E. Richardson, owner of radio station WASK (1450 AM). The station originally operated as a primary CBS and DuMont affiliate. During the late 1950s, the station was also briefly affiliated with the NTA Film Network.

WFAM-TV's transmitter had originally broadcast at low power, making it unreceivable in parts of west-central Indiana outside of the immediate Lafayette area. Out of its original 20-person staff, only one person had any experience in television; the rest were radio personalities who pulled double duty.

WLFI-TV logo used from 2000 to 2012.

In 1957, both the television station and the radio station were sold to assistant station manager Henry Rosenthal and his partners, who filed with the Federal Communications Commission (FCC) to move WFAM-TV to channel 18, but the station instead went dark in May 1959. Rosenthal sold the station to Sarkes Tarzian, a radio manufacturer based in Bloomington, which also owned primary NBC/secondary ABC and DuMont affiliate WTTV (now a CBS affiliate) in Indianapolis and ABC affiliate WPTA in Fort Wayne. It was Tarzian who finished the relocation to channel 18, returning WFAM-TV to the air on that channel on November 15 of that year. (The channel 59 allocation remained dormant until the FCC later reassigned the allotment to Indianapolis used by WPDS-TV—now Fox affiliate WXIN—in February 1984.) The station changed its call letters to WLFI-TV in 1967. In 1979, the station was purchased by Block Communications. In 2000, LIN TV Corporation acquired WLFI from Block in exchange for a 67% ownership interest in ABC affiliate WAND (now an NBC affiliate) in Decatur, Illinois (LIN TV later sold off its remaining 33% interest in WAND to Block Communications).

WLFI's broadcasts became digital-only, effective June 12, 2009.

On March 21, 2014, Media General announced that it would merge with LIN Media in a $1.6 billion deal. The merger was completed on December 19. Nexstar Broadcasting Group announced on January 27, 2016, that it would merge with Media General in a $4.6 billion acquisition; it then announced on June 13, 2016, that it would sell WLFI-TV and four other stations to Heartland Media, through its USA Television MidAmerica Holdings joint venture with MSouth Equity Partners, for $115 million, to comply with FCC ownership caps following the merger. The sale was completed on January 17. On October 1, 2019, Allen Media Broadcasting, a subsidiary of Entertainment Studios, announced that it would acquire 11 of USA TV's stations, including WLFI-TV, for $290 million. The sale was completed on February 11, 2020.

WLFI was one of the Lafayette area's two commercial network television broadcasters between its launch in 1953 and the 2016 launch of WPBI-LD, a Fox and NBC affiliate; the other station was WTTK (channel 29), a satellite station of WTTV that began broadcasting in 1988. Cable providers have long supplemented the area with stations from Indianapolis. Comcast Xfinity dropped the Indianapolis stations from its lineup on March 7, 2018, but resumed carriage of NBC affiliate WTHR and ABC affiliate WRTV two days later.

On June 1, 2025, amid financial woes and rising debt, Allen Media Group announced that it would explore "strategic options" for the company, such as a sale of its television stations (including WLFI). On August 8, 2025, it was announced that AMG would sell 12 of its stations, including WLFI, to Gray Media for $171 million. The sale of WLFI was completed on March 27, 2026, marking Gray's entry into the Lafayette–West Lafayette market.

== Programming ==
WLFI-TV carries the entire CBS network schedule; however, it airs the CBS WKND lineup in two blocks—with the first two hours airing on Saturday mornings (leading into the Saturday edition of CBS Mornings, which itself airs two hours later than most CBS stations that carry the broadcast) and the final hour airing on Sunday mornings.

=== News operation ===
WLFI-TV presently broadcasts 22 1/2 hours of locally produced newscasts each week (with four hours each weekday, 1 1/2 hours on Saturdays and one hour on Sundays); unlike most CBS affiliates in the Eastern Time Zone, the station's early evening newscast at 5 p.m. runs only for a half-hour, with the station opting to run syndicated programs during the 5:30 p.m. half-hour.

Even after cable systems began piping in Indianapolis stations in the 1970s, the station's newscasts have performed well in the ratings; its success was largely attributed to the longevity of most of its news staff, some of whom had been at the station for over 20 years, including former anchors Jeff Smith and Chris Morisse, sports anchor Larry Clisby and meteorologist Steve Scherer.

In September 2012, WLFI became the third television station in Central Indiana to begin broadcasting its local newscasts in high definition; as part of the upgrade, the station unveiled a new graphics package (a modified version of the package used by CBS owned-and-operated station WBBM-TV in Chicago from when it upgraded its newscasts to high definition in 2008 until 2010) and a new set for its newscasts.

On January 17, 2025, Allen Media Group announced plans to cut local meteorologist/weather forecaster positions from its stations, including WLFI, and replacing them with a "weather hub" produced by The Weather Channel, which AMG also owns.

==== Notable former on-air staff ====
- Jane King

== Subchannels ==
The station's signal is multiplexed:

Subchannels of WLFI-TV
Channel	Res.	Short name	Programming
18.1	1080i	CBS	CBS
18.2	1080i	CW	The CW Plus
18.3	480i	ION	Ion
18.4	480i	GETTV	Great
18.5	480i	START	Start TV

WLFI formerly carried TheCoolTV on digital subchannel 18.2 from 2011 to 2013, when LIN Media terminated its affiliation agreement with the music video network. The live feed of "Storm Team 18 Live Doppler Radar" moved from digital subchannel 18.3 to 18.2 in the fall of 2013. Sony Pictures Television's GetTV network, which features classic movies, replaced the weather radar channel on WLFI-DT2 in early 2015. In Fall 2015, WLFI-DT3 was launched to serve as an Ion Television affiliate. The CW Plus began to be broadcast over WLFI-DT2 in 720p HD in August 2017, moving GetTV to a new 18.4 subchannel and leading to the CBS feed on their main channel being downscaled into 720p for the time being (presumably due to bandwidth limitations resulting from their encoding equipment, which is only capable of using a "Constant" Bitrate Allocation, versus "Variable"); however, by November 2021 CBS and CW+ programming was upgraded to 1080i full HD, at the expense of bandwidth on the remaining subchannels. WLFI-DT2 is being identified on-air as "Lafayette's CW18".
