= Systems simulation =

Imitation of real-world processes

Computers are used to generate numeric models for the purpose of describing or displaying complex interaction among multiple variables within a system. The complexity of the system arises from the stochastic (probabilistic) nature of the events, rules for the interaction of the elements and the difficulty in perceiving the behavior of the systems as a whole with the passing of time.

== Systems Simulation in Video Games ==
One of the most notable video games to incorporate systems simulation is Sim City, which simulates the multiple systems of a functioning city including but not limited to: electricity, water, sewage, public transportation, population growth, social interactions (including, but not limited to jobs, education and emergency response).

== See also ==
- Agent-based model
- Discrete event simulation
- NetLogo
- Systems Dynamics
