= Organizational behavior and human resources =

Organizational behavior and human resources (OBHR) is a field of study housed in most business schools that has evolved from the overlap in offerings and objectives from courses taught in organizational behavior and human resource management.

Organizational Behavior studies human behavior in social settings with an emphasis on explaining, predicting, and understanding behavior in organizations. Empirical generalizations and theories emanating from the cognitive and reinforcement paradigms and models of social influence are examined as the basis for analysis and understanding of topics such as motivation, leadership behavior, task performance, problem solving and decision making, group functioning, and other classes of behavior relevant to organizational effectiveness.

Human Resource Management emphasizes human resource systems, design and implementation of various personnel tests, collection and validation of employee demographic data, job classification techniques, examination of psychometric requirements in compensation programming, training impact analysis, and issues in performance appraisal systems. .

The Society for Human Resource Management reports that there are at least 190 OBHR graduate programs worldwide, including both masters and doctoral programs.
