= Gregory Weeks =

Austrian historian

Gregory Weeks (born 1970) is a lecturer and teaches and researches civil-military relations, genocide prevention, and twentieth century Austrian and German diplomatic and military history.

== Education and research ==
He received his doctorate in Contemporary History from the Karl-Franzens-Universität in Graz, Austria, and earned his M.A. in European History from Purdue University. As a Charles H. Revson Foundation Fellow at the United States Holocaust Memorial Museum in 2004–2005, he conducted research on “The Role of the Vienna Municipal Police in the Forced Emigration and Murder of Jews, 1938–1944. In 2006, he was the Baron Friedrich Carl von Oppenheim Chair for the Study of Racism, Antisemitism, and the Holocaust at the Holocaust Martyrs’ and Heroes’ Remembrance Authority, Yad Vashem, in Jerusalem. Most recently in the Fall of 2008, he was a Corrie ten Boom Fellow at the USC Shoah Foundation’s Visual History Archive in Los Angeles.

== Publications and literature ==
Weeks has co-authored Vienna’s Conscience: Close-Ups and Conversations after Hitler (2007), which focuses on the fiftieth anniversary of the annexation of Austria by Germany in 1938 and Austrian efforts to confront the country’s World War II past. In addition, he has authored over a dozen scholarly articles, among others on the German colonial wars, Leni Riefenstahl, and the Weimar Republic. Together with the War Crimes Section of the Canadian Department of Justice, he conducted archival research to aid in the post-war trials of Austrian National Socialists. Weeks has received distinguished fellowships and awards from several institutions and foundations including the United States Military Academy, the Leucorea Foundation, and the Stuttgart Seminar in Cultural Studies. With a Holocaust Educational Foundation Fellowship, Professor Weeks spent a summer studying the Holocaust and Jewish Civilization with prominent scholars from across the globe in 1998.

=== Books and book chapters ===
- Weeks, Gregory (2008). Military History of Germany, 1815 to the Present. Westport: Praeger Security Intl. ISBN 978-0-275-98534-9. OCLC 269437279.
- Weeks, Gregory (2008). "Austria Regains Its Independence (Austrian State Treaty)". In Gorman, Robert F. (ed.). Great events from history. The 20th century, 1941–1970. Vol. 3. Pasadena, CA: Salem Press. ISBN 978-1-58765-333-9. OCLC 171152145. LCC D421 .G6295 2008.
- Weeks, Gregory (2008). "Die erste Republik aus US-amerikanischer Sicht" [The First Republic from an American Perspective]. In Karner, Stefan; Mikoletzky, Lorenz; Zollinger, Manfred (eds.). Österreich. 90 Jahre Republik: Beitragsband der Ausstellung im Parlament [Of Austria. 90 years of Republic: review of the issues in Parliament] (in German). Innsbruck: Studien Verlag. pp. 565–570. ISBN 978-3-7065-4664-5. OCLC 277195118.
- Popović, Petar; Weeks, Gregory (2007). "The EU and the Balkans in the Twenty-First Century: The Trauma of War and Hopes for Stability in the Region". In Sergi, Bruno S; Bagatelas, William T. (eds.). Economic and political development ethics: Europe and beyond. Bratislava: Iura Edition. ISBN 978-80-8078-167-5. OCLC 182530333.
- Winter, Richard; Balk, Susan Winter; Weeks, Gregory (2007). Vienna's conscience: close-ups and conversations after Hitler. St. Louis, MO: Reedy Press. ISBN 978-1-933370-08-8. OCLC 213866939.
- Weeks, Gregory (2005). "The Legacy of the Habsburg Empire for the EU". In Sergi, Bruno S.; Bagatelas, William T. (eds.). Ethical Implications of Post-Communist Transition Economics and Politics in Europe. Bratislava: Iura Edition. ISBN 978-80-8078-045-6. OCLC 60455929.
- Weeks, Gregory (2004). "The Common Foreign and Security Policy of the European Union, 1950–2004: Lessons from the Past for the Future?". In Sergi, Bruno S.; Bagatelas, William T. (eds.). Economics and politics: has 9/11 changed anything?. Bratislava: Iura Edition. ISBN 978-80-8078-007-4. OCLC 56565086.
- Weeks, Gregory (2000). "Fifty Years of Pain: A History of Austrian Disabled Veterans after 1945". In Gerber, David A. (ed.). Disabled veterans in history. Corporealities. Ann Arbor: University of Michigan Press. pp. 229–250. ISBN 978-0-472-11033-9. OCLC 247524557. LCC UB360 .D57 2000.
- Weeks, Gregory (1999–2002). "Leontine Sagan". In Commire, Anne; Klezmer, Deborah (eds.). Women in world history: a biographical encyclopedia. Vol. 13. Waterford, CT: Yorkin Publications. ISBN 978-0-7876-4071-2. OCLC 41108563.

=== Journal articles ===
- Weeks, Gregory (10 Mar 2006). "Understanding the Holocaust: The Past and Future of Holocaust Studies". Contemporary European History. 15 (1). Cambridge [England]; New York: Cambridge University Press: 117–129. doi:10.1017/S0960777306003134. ISSN 1469-2171. OCLC 43383809.
- Weeks, Gregory (2003). Sergi, Bruno S. (ed.). "2. The Balkan 'brain drain' and its consequences" (PDF). Four accounts on the 'brain drain' in the Balkans. South-East Europe Review for Labour and Social Affairs. 6 (4). Baden-Baden: Nomos: 15–17. ISBN 9781933370088. ISSN 1435-2869. OCLC 609921288. Archived from the original (PDF) on 2004-06-09.
- Weeks, Gregory (Winter 2001). "The Linguistic Legacy of the Civil War: How the Civil War changed American English". American Studies Journal (48). Halle, Saxony-Anhalt, Germany: Center for United States Studies at Martin Luther University of Halle-Wittenberg, Germany: 52–56. ISBN 9781933370088. ISSN 1433-5239. OCLC 230085876.
- Weeks, Gregory (September 1995). "Der Nationalsozialistische Traum von einem Deutsch-Mittelafrikanischen Reich, 1933–1943" [The National Socialist dream of a German Central African Empire, 1933–1943]. Geschichte und Gegenwart: Vierteljahreshefte für Zeitgeschichte, Gesellschaftsanalyse und politische Bildung (in German). 14 (3). Graz, Austria: Styria. ISBN 9781933370088. ISSN 1017-1444. OCLC 472888623.
- Weeks, Gregory (May 1990). "The Roman Limes Wall of Defense in Southern Germany". Pompeiiana Newsletter. 16 (9). Indianapolis: Pompeiiana, Inc: 1–3. ISBN 9781933370088. ISSN 0892-5941. OCLC 15250306.

=== Museum exhibit projects ===
- Consultant and Organizing Committee Member for “The New Austria” Exhibit commemorating the fiftieth anniversary of the signing of the Austrian State Treaty, Belvedere Museum, Vienna, Austria, 2005
- Consultant to “Austria is Free” Exhibit in the Schallaburg, Lower Austria, 2005
- Consultant to “Austria: 90 Years of the Republic,” 2008–2009 in the Austrian Parliament
