= Dave Fuente =

Dave Fuente (born in 1945) is the Chairman of the operations consulting firm SSA & Company, LLC. He is also on the board of directors at Ryder System, Inc., Sunrise Senior Living, Inc., and a past Director of Dick's Sporting Goods since 1993. He became the Presiding Non-Management director of Dick's Sporting Goods on March 16, 2010. He is the Director of OPEN Sports Network, Inc., The Vitamin Shoppe, and is a trustee of the University of Miami, Boca Raton Community Hospital, and Baron Select Funds - Baron Partners Fund.

== Education ==
Fuente obtained his BA and MBA degrees from Purdue University.

== Career at Office Depot ==
He became the Chairman of Office Depot in 1987 and was the company's director and CEO from December 1987 to July 17, 2000. Fuente took the then fledgling company public in 1988 and increased its footprint from 173 stores in 1990 to over 1000 stores by 2000 when he relinquished his CEO title. He continues to serve on the company's Board of Directors.

Prior to Office Depot, Fuente was the President of the Paint Stores Group of Sherwin-Williams for 8 years. He also served as the marketing director at Gould Electronics, Inc.
