= JoMei Chang =

Chinese computer scientist

JoMei Chang (born 1952) is a Taiwanese computer scientist and technology business executive in Silicon Valley and China. Chang was named a leading CEO by Fortune Magazine and an Entrepreneur of the Year by BusinessWeek.

== Life ==
Born circa 1952 in Taiwan, Chang was accepted into the National Chiao Tung University where she received a B.S. in Electric Engineering in 1974.

Chang graduated from Purdue University with a M.S. and Ph.D. in Electrical Engineering and Database Management. In 2004, Purdue University honored her with the Outstanding Electrical & Computer Engineer Award.

Chang co-patented a protocol for reliable multicast with Nicholas F. Maxemchuk. Her often-cited papers were published in 1984.

=== Vitria ===
In October 1994 Chang and her husband Dale Skeen founded Vitria Technology to do business process management and enterprise application integration. Chang and Skeen provided initial funding for Vitria, along with Robert M. Halperin. Additional venture capital in subsequent rounds came from Brentwood Associates, Sutter Hill Ventures and Weston Presidio Capital. Vitria filed for their initial public offering (IPO) in June 1999 during the dot-com bubble. The stock shares were listed on the Nasdaq exchange under the symbol "VITR" on September 16, raising about $50 million. For the year 1999, the company reported a net loss of about $16 million on revenues of about $31.5 million. Vitria was headquartered in Sunnyvale, California. For the year 2002, net loss was $91.6 million on revenues of about $97 million. Lawsuits were filed and consolidated into Kideys, et al., v. Vitria Technology, Inc., et al., Case No. 01-CV-10092 alleging misrepresentations around the IPO. The company defended itself and offered settlement. On June 18, 2003, the Vitria board approved a settlement.

In December 2003, Chang resigned as chief executive of Vitria (but remained chair of the board). The Beijing, China, operations of Vitria were sold to ChiLin LLC, which she owned, for about $1.5 million. In April 2004 the name was changed to QilinSoft. It aimed to introduce integration and BPM technology to China. In September 2006, Chang with Skeen proposed privatization of Vitria for about $67 million. After some objections, the transaction closed in March 2007. She returned as CEO in July 2007.
