= Ming Ming (giant panda) =

Giant panda (1977–2011)

Ming Ming 明明
- Species: Giant panda
- Sex: Female
- Born: Ming Ming; 1977; China
- Died: 7 May 2011 (aged 34); Xiangjiang Wild Animal World, Guangdong Province, China
- Known for: World's oldest giant panda
- Owners: Wolong National Nature Reserve (1979–1986); Dublin Zoo (1986); Chengdu (1986–1991); London Zoo (1991–1994); Xiangjiang Wild Animal World (1998–2011)

Ming Ming (Note: Chinese: 明明; pinyin: Míngmíng; lit. 'Bright';) (1977 – 7 May 2011) was a female giant panda. She was rescued from the wild the year she was born, and beginning in June 1986, she lived at Dublin Zoo with another giant panda, Ping Ping, for 100 days. From 1991 to 1994, Ming Ming was sent to London Zoo and tried to mate with another giant panda, but she was returned to China in 1994 after they proved incompatible.

Ming Ming lived the remainder of her life at the Xiangjiang Wild Animal World in Guangdong Province. She died of kidney failure at age 34, making her the oldest giant panda until 16 October 2016, when Jia Jia died at the age of 38.

== Life ==
Ming Ming was born in 1977 and rescued from the wild in Pingwu County, Sichuan, later that year. In June 1986, Ming Ming and Ping Ping were sent from Chengdu to Dublin Zoo in Ireland on a 100-day loan. Irish news broadcaster RTÉ asked if they could have one of the giant pandas appear on The Late Late Show, but due to animal welfare concerns, the request was denied by Chinese officials. From 1991 to 1994, Ming Ming also spent three years at London Zoo, where she attempted to mate with Bao Bao, a giant panda from Berlin, but she was returned to China after the two of them got into a fight. In 1998, she moved from the China Conservation and Research Center for the Giant Panda in Wolong to settle at the Xiangjiang Wild Animal World.

== Death ==
On 7 May 2011, Ming Ming died at age 34 due to age-related diseases and kidney failure at the Xiangjiang Wild Animal World in Guangdong Province, making her the oldest giant panda at the time. Prior to her death, blood was found in Ming Ming's urine, which proved that her kidney had failed due to old age. Her death was not reported on by Chinese state media until May 17, 2011. This record was broken on October 16, 2016, when Jia Jia died at the age of 38.

== See also ==
- List of individual giant pandas
- List of individual bears

== Notes ==
Honorary titles
Preceded by Taotao	Oldest living giant panda 2 April 2008 – 7 May 2011	Succeeded by Jia Jia
