= Marshall Larsen =

American businessman

Marshall O. Larsen (born c. 1948) is an American businessman. He served as the Chief Executive Officer, President, and Chairman of the Board of Goodrich Corporation from 2003 until its acquisition by United Technologies Corporation (UTC) in 2012. He now sits on the Board of Directors of UTC.

== Biography ==
=== Early life ===
Marshall Larsen attended the U.S. Military Academy and graduated with a B.S. degree in 1970. He also attended graduate school at Krannert School of Management and graduated with a M.S. degree in 1977.

=== Career ===
He joined the company in 1977 as an Operations Analyst. Since then, he had served in various positions at the company, including Director of Planning and Analysis, Director of Product Marketing, Assistant to the President, and General Manager of many segments of the company's aerospace business. In 1994, he was elected to be the Vice President of Goodrich and Group Vice President of Goodrich Aerospace. By 1995, he was the Executive Vice President, President and Chief Operating Officer of the aerospace division. While CEO of Goodrich Aerospace in 2009, Marshall O. Larsen earned a total compensation of $6,088,533, which included a base salary of $1,100,000, a cash bonus of $1,492,812, stocks granted of $2,251,200, options granted of $1,015,350, and other compensation of $229,171.

In addition to his service at Goodrich Corporation, he has also served as the Chairman of Charlotte Regional Partnership, Vice Chairman and Director of BFGoodrich Aerospace, and a Director of Lowe's. He is also a member of the Board of Governors of Aerospace Industries Association and General Aviation Manufacturers Association.
