= Daniel Lau =

American electrical engineer

- Education: Purdue University; University of Delaware
- Occupation: Electrical engineer

Daniel Lau is an American electrical engineer. He is the DataBeam Professor in the department of electrical engineering at the University of Kentucky.

In 2026, Lau was named a fellow of the Institute of Electrical and Electronics Engineers, "for contributions to digital printing and 3D imaging".
