= Michael R. Baye =

American economist

Michael Roy Baye (born April 6, 1958) is the "Bert Elwert" Professor of Business Economics in the Kelley School of Business at Indiana University.

== Education and profession ==
Baye received his B.S. in economics from Texas A&M University in 1980 and earned a Ph.D. in economics from the Krannert School of Management at Purdue University in 1983. Baye has held appointments at Cambridge, Oxford, Erasmus, Tilburg, and the New Economic School in Moscow. He has won many awards for outstanding teaching, and regularly teaches courses in managerial economics and industrial organization at the undergraduate, M.B.A., and Ph.D. level.

As of July 2007, Baye has accepted a position to lead the Federal Trade Commission Bureau of Economics. As director, he advises the FTC on economic policy matters. He is a special consultant for NERA Economic Consulting.

== Work in economics ==
Baye's research primarily focuses on pricing strategies and their impact on consumer welfare and firm profits. His early papers dealt with the construction of price indices when firms charge different prices for the same product to consumers that have imperfect price information. His later works showed that, by appropriately adjusting price indices, cost-of-living measures and real wage indices to account for a progressive income tax, one could quantify the impact of "bracket creep" on consumer welfare. This research contributed to the policy debate of the 1980s by documenting the “cost” of various proposals to delay or repeal the indexation of the US federal income tax code.

His more recent work utilizes tools of game theory and industrial organization to derive equilibrium strategies in network industries, mergers, auctions, and contests. Much of this research concerns pricing strategies in oligopoly environments where consumers view the products sold by different firms to be close substitutes. Among other things, it shows that optimal pricing strategies by firms and information “gatekeepers” can lead to equilibrium price dispersion when firms have identical costs, shoppers are well-informed, and firms’ products are perceived to be identical.

Many of these pricing strategies are discussed in his best-selling managerial economics textbook (Managerial Economics and Business Strategy, 7th Ed.), and are taught to business students around the world.
