= Jeffrey J. Reuer =

American business strategy scholar

Jeffrey Jon Reuer is an American business strategy scholar. He is the Guggenheim Endowed Chair in Strategy and Entrepreneurship at the Leeds School of Business at the University of Colorado-Boulder.

== Education and career ==
Reuer received a Bachelor of Science in management with the highest distinction from Purdue University, a masters of business administration from Marquette University, and a 1997 PhD in Strategic Management from Purdue University.

He served as an assistant professor of strategy and management at INSEAD in Fontainebleau, France. He was a tenured associate professor of strategy at the Fisher School of Business at Ohio State University. He was the Boyd W. Harris, Jr. Distinguished Scholar and Professor of Strategic Management at the Kenan-Flagler School of Business at the University of North Carolina at Chapel Hill from 2004 to 2008. He was the Blake Family Endowed Chair in Strategic Management and Governance and Strategic Management Area Head from 2008 until moving to the University of Colorado in 2015.

== Awards and honors ==
Reuer is a fellow of the Strategic Management Society and was the first recipient of that society's Emerging Scholar Award.
