= Susan Bulkeley Butler =

Founder and CEO of the Susan Bulkeley Butler Institute

Susan Bulkeley Butler is the founder and CEO of the Susan Bulkeley Butler Institute for the Development of Women Leaders in Tucson, Arizona, and the author of the book Become the CEO of You, Inc. (2006).

She was hired as the first woman professional at Arthur Andersen in 1965, and in 1979 went on to be named the first woman partner at the firm (subsequently known as Andersen Consulting, and now the $15 billion NYSE company Accenture).

Butler is an alumna of Purdue University's Krannert School of Management, which also awarded her an honorary doctorate in management in 1999.

== Bibliography ==
- Become the CEO of You, Inc. (2006)
