= Bruce E. Dale =

Bruce E. Dale is a professor of chemical engineering at Michigan State University. He specializes in studies of renewable energy sources, and is currently working on creating methods of turning grass into ethanol for use as fuel.

Dale received his bachelor's and master's degrees from the University of Arizona and his Ph.D. from Purdue University.

Dale is a convert to the Church of Jesus Christ of Latter-day Saints (LDS Church). He served as a missionary for the church in the Mexico West Mission. He has been a bishop and Sunday School teacher in the LDS Church. From 1999 to 2008 Dale served as stake president of the Lansing Michigan Stake.

Prior to joining the faculty of MSU, Dale was a professor at Colorado State University and at Texas A&M University.

In July, 2009 Dale and George W. Huber co-authored the front-page article for Scientific American about the potential of organic food, specifically non-edible organic fuels.

== Sources ==
- MSU faculty bio page
- article by Dale on biomass
- Huffington Post article on alternative energy sources by Dale
- "New Stake Presidents", Church News, November 22, 2008
- intro bio about Dale
- "New stake presidencies", Church News, October 17, 1999
