= Alex Golden Oblad =

American chemist (1909–2000)

Alex Golden Oblad (November 26, 1909 – September 19, 2000) was a prominent chemist and chemical engineer principally recognized for his pioneering work in catalysis and catalytic chemistry.

== Early life and education ==
Oblad was born in Salt Lake City, Utah and raised in Sugar House, Utah. Educated first at the University of Utah and subsequently receiving a Ph.D. from Purdue University, he spent the bulk of his career working for energy and engineering companies developing innovative chemical processes.

== Career ==
His career began at Standard Oil of Indiana in the 1930s and included increasingly important research and management positions at Mobil Oil, Houdri Process Company, Air Products, and the M.W. Kellogg Company, of which Oblad became vice president of research.

Among his most recognized achievements was development of catalytic cracking, a process he worked on with Eugene Houdry and others that made economically feasible the low-cost, mass production of high-octane gasoline. After a distinguished career in industry, Oblad accepted a teaching and research position at the University of Utah as Distinguished Professor of Fuels Engineering, where he also served for several years as acting college dean. Oblad received honorary doctorate degrees from both the University of Utah and Purdue University in recognition of his contributions to each institution.

A lifelong member of the Church of Jesus Christ of Latter-day Saints (LDS Church) and dedicated husband and father of six, Oblad died in 2000 of causes incident to age. Oblad also wrote an article on the work of Eugene Jules Houdry and was a member of the National Academy of Engineering and the National Academy of Sciences.

== Sources ==
- Report on Oblad patents
- Meridian Magazine article on Mormon Scientists
- Article on Houdry and his process, listing work by Oblad as a source
- Salt Lake City newspaper article upon Oblad's death
