= Mingming Wu =

Chinese-born scientist

- Education: Nanjing University (B.S.); Ohio State University (Ph.D)
- Known for: Microfluidics; Cell Migration; Cancer cell invasion Dynamic imaging
- Awards: Fellow of the American Physical Society (2016); Swiss International Visiting Scholar (2010); Young Research Scientist Fellowship - French Ministry of Defense (1992)
- Scientific career
- Fields: Nanobiotechnology; Biophysics
- Workplaces: Cornell University; Occidental College; University of California, Santa Barbara; École Polytechnique; Ohio State University
- Doctoral advisor: C. David Andereck
- Website: biofluidics.bee.cornell.edu

Mingming Wu is a professor at Cornell University within the Department of Biological and Environmental Engineering, and associate editor of Physical Biology.

== Academic career ==
She earned a bachelor's of science degree in physics from Nanjing University, and completed a doctorate of philosophy also in physics from Ohio State University. Wu split her post doctoral research between École Polytechnique and the University of California, Santa Barbara, before beginning her teaching career at Occidental College. She joined the Cornell University faculty in 2003. Wu was named a fellow of the American Physical Society in 2016.

== Research ==
Wu's current work focuses on discovering fundamental principles with which nature use to interact with the environment, in particular, how physical forces regulate cell migration. She is known for developing micro-scale tools controlling cellular environment, and use them to solve contemporary problems in health (tumor invasion and development) and environment (algal blooms).

Wu researched the interactions between cancer cells and the fibrous extracellular matrix surrounding them. Wu also worked on a study investigating the diversity of cancer cells with statistical modeling methods.
