= Ann E. Hagerman =

American chemist and researcher

Academic background
- Education: A.B, biology and chemistry, 1976, Occidental College; PhD, biochemistry, 1980, Purdue University
- Thesis: Condensed tannin of sorghum grain: purification and interactions with proteins. (1980)

Academic work
- Institutions: Miami University
- Main interests: Antioxidant activity, Tannin chemistry, and Plant polyphenols
- Notable works: High Molecular Weight Plant Polyphenolics (Tannins) as Biological Antioxidant

Ann E. Hagerman is an American chemist. She is a professor of biochemistry at Miami University and an expert on Tannin chemistry. In 1998, she published High Molecular Weight Plant Polyphenolics (Tannins) as Biological Antioxidants, one of the most highly cited papers in the field.

== Early life and education ==
Hagerman earned her Bachelor of Arts degree from Occidental College in 1976 before enrolling at Purdue University for her PhD in biochemistry.

== Interests ==
Hagerman's main research interests are Antioxidant, Tannins, and Plant polyphenols. At Miami University she has her own research page called, "Ann Hagerman Lab" where she has research overviews of Tannins and Polyphenols.

== Career ==
Upon earning her PhD, Hagerman accepted an assistant professor position at Miami University's Department of Chemistry & Biochemistry. While at Miami, Hagerman published High Molecular Weight Plant Polyphenolics (Tannins) as Biological Antioxidants, which was recognized by Thomson Scientific Essential Science Indicators as one of the most highly cited papers in the field. Her research on Tannins was continuously funded by the United States Department of Agriculture, National Science Foundation, the National Institutes of Health, the Cancer Research Foundation of America, and Lipton Tea Company. During the 1980s, she published two journal articles on Tannis chemistry; Role of tannins in defending plants against ruminants: Reduction in protein availability and The specificity of proanthocyanidin‑protein interactions. The former was the first publication describing the high affinity of polyphenols for proline-rich proteins, and provided a chemical basis for the tight binding. The latter journal article established that dietary tannins impact nitrogen digestibility and availability in herbivorous mammals. In 1997, she received the Miami University Researchers of the Year award. The following year, she wrote the first Tannins handbook, "a compilation of methods developed in her laboratory for analyzing tannins."

In 2010, Hagerman collaborated with chemist Javier Gonzalez and soil scientist Jonathan Halvorson to discover if tannins could be applied to help make good soil and healthy livestock. In the same year, she became the first American to receive the Groupe Polyphenols Scientific Prize at the International Conference on Polyphenols. In 2018, Hagerman was named Chemist of the Year by the American Chemical Society's Cincinnati Section. In her 2020 paper Decrypting bacterial polyphenol metabolism in an anoxic wetland soil, she worked alongside Kelly Wrighton and Bridget McGivern to demonstrate that polyphenols are actively metabolized by selected microorganisms in anoxic soil systems.
