= Victor Denenberg =

American developmental psychobiologist

Victor H. Denenberg
- Born: April 3, 1925
- Died: July 18, 2008 (aged 83)
- Education: Purdue University
- Scientific career
- Fields: Developmental psychobiology
- Workplaces: University of Connecticut; University of Washington; Purdue University

Victor H. Denenberg (April 3, 1925 – July 19, 2008) was an American developmental psychobiologist. He obtained his Ph.D. in 1953 from Purdue University, where he served as an assistant professor until 1969. In 1969, he became a professor at the University of Connecticut at Storrs in the newly formed program in Biobehavioral Sciences, which he led from 1984 to 2000. After his retirement in 2000, he became a professor emeritus at the University of Washington. Denenberg published over 400 scholarly papers and book chapters and trained more than 70 M.S. and Ph.D. students. He was an academic icon of his era.
