= Richard Bootzin =

Richard Ronald Bootzin (February 25, 1940 – December 4, 2014) was an American clinical and research psychologist. Bootzin served as a professor of psychology and psychiatry at the University of Arizona in Tucson. He was also the Director of the Insomnia Clinic of at the University Medical Center and the director of the Sleep Research Laboratory in the Psychology Department.

He received his undergraduate degree in psychology from the University of Wisconsin–Madison in 1963. He received both his master's and doctorate degrees from Purdue University in 1966 and 1968 respectively. His research focused on understanding and treating sleep disorders, cognitive processing during sleep, the role of expectancy and placebos in behavior change, and methodology in evaluating intervention outcomes.

He was a professor of psychology at Northwestern University for 19 years and joined the psychology faculty at the University of Arizona in 1987. His area of interest was sleep and sleep disorders with particular attention to insomnia. Stimulus control, his non-drug treatment for insomnia, is studied and used worldwide, including at the Veterans’ Administration, as the gold standard for the disorder. As president of the Psychological Clinical Science Accreditation System, he also was a leader in the effort to assure that science-based treatments are the norm in clinical psychology by accrediting clinical psychology departments throughout the United States that are science-based.

Bootzin died on December 4, 2014, after being afflicted with heart disease for 35 years. Bootzin was married to Maris (Mitzi) and had two daughters.

== Honors ==
Awarded 2011 Distinguished Scientist Award from the Society for the Science of Clinical Psychology. Received the 2008 Mary A. Carskadon Outstanding Educator Award from the Sleep Research Society. Elected president of the board of directors of the Psychological Clinical Science Accreditation System (PCSAS) 2008–2012. Elected member of board of directors of the Association for Psychological Science (APS) 2004–2007. Elected president (1998–2001) and founding board member (1995) of the Academy of Psychological Clinical Science (APCS).
