= Jane King (journalist) =

American journalist

Jane Kingseed, better known as Jane King (born January 26, 1968), is an American journalist. King is the founder and CEO of LilaMax Media, which provides daily TV broadcast reports from the NYSE. LilaMax Media launched January 21, 2014. King had previously been doing syndicated business and financial reports for Bloomberg News from the floor of the New York Stock Exchange. Those reports were discontinued on December 31, 2013. Before that, King covered local Business News for CNN's Newsource division, CNN Marketsource. Before joining CNN, King worked as a business reporter for WPVI-TV in Philadelphia and as an anchor and reporter at both WAND-TV in Decatur, Illinois. King began as a reporter for WLFI-TV in Lafayette, Indiana. King launched LilaMax Media on January 13, 2014, in which she now does syndicated reports from the NYSE.

Outside of journalism, King also has served as member and floor trader for the Chicago Board of Trade and as an adjunct professor of broadcast journalism at Purdue University.

King, who grew up in Greentown, Indiana and Kokomo, Indiana, lives in New York City, and is married, with one son and one daughter. She was awarded a Bachelor of Arts degree in Telecommunications from Purdue University in 1991.
