= Ming-Ming Zhou =

Chinese-American scientist

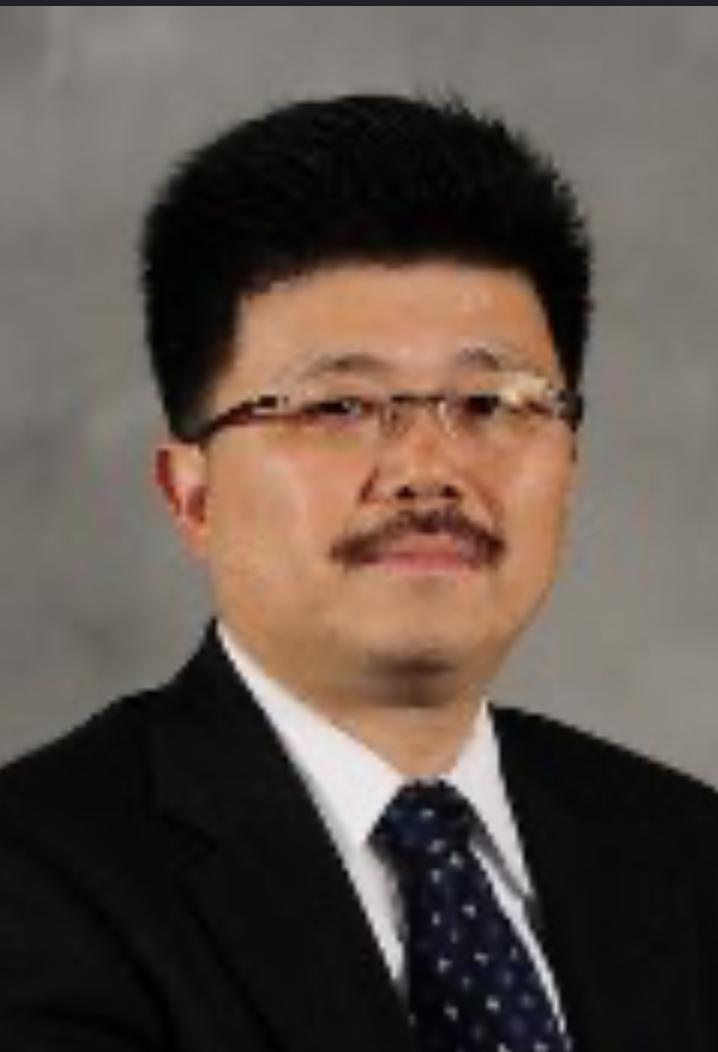
- Education: East China University of Science and Technology; Michigan Technological University; Purdue University
- Known for: Bromodomain biology and drug discovery
- Scientific career
- Fields: Structural and Chemical Biology; Epigenetics; Drug Discovery
- Workplaces: Icahn School of Medicine at Mount Sinai; Mount Sinai Medical Center

Ming-Ming Zhou is an American scientist whose specification is structural and chemical biology, NMR spectroscopy, and drug design. He is the Dr. Harold and Golden Lamport Professor and Chairman of the Department of Pharmacological Sciences. He is also the co-director of the Drug Discovery Institute at the Icahn School of Medicine at Mount Sinai and Mount Sinai Health System in New York City, as well as Professor of Sciences. Zhou is an elected fellow of the American Association for the Advancement of Science.

Zhou has published more than 180 research articles and is an inventor of 28 patents. His research has been funded by grants from federal, state and private research foundations including: the National Institutes of Health, the National Science Foundation, the New York State Stem Cell Science, the Institute for the Study of Aging, the American Foundation for AIDS Research, the American Cancer Society, GlaxoSmithKline, the Michael J. Fox Foundation, the Samuel Waxman Cancer Research Foundation, and the Wellcome Trust. He serves on the board of directors at the New York Structural Biology Center, as well as on the editorial boards of ACS Medicinal Chemistry Letters, the Journal of Molecular Cell Biology, and Cancer Research.

== Biography ==
Zhou earned his B.E. in chemical engineering from the East China University of Science and Technology (Shanghai, PRC) in 1984. He earned his M.S. in chemistry from the Michigan Technological University in 1988 and a Ph.D. in chemistry from Purdue University in Indiana in 1993. He completed his postdoctoral fellowship at Abbott Laboratories in Chicago, Illinois, then joined the faculty of the Mount Sinai Medical School in 1997.

== Research ==
Zhou's research is directed at better understanding the biology of epigenetic control of gene transcription of the human genome to attain both the underlying basic principles and rational design of novel chemical compounds that modulate gene expression in chromatin. His research studies have broad implications in human biology and disease, ranging from cell development, to stem cell self-renewal, differentiation, and re-programming to human cancer and inflammation, as well as neurodegenerative disorders. Among his major contributions to science are the Zhou Lab's discovery of the bromodomain as the acetyl-lysine binding domain ('chromatin reader') in gene transcription (Nature 1999) and the first demonstrations of druggability and therapeutic potential of bromodomain proteins in gene transcription to treat a wide array of human diseases, including cancer and inflammation. This concept has had transformative impacts in epigenetic drug discoveries in the pharmaceutical industry.

The Zhou Lab further discovered the tandem PHD finger of DPF3b as a first alternative to the bromodomain for acetyl-lysine binding (Nature 2010), and the PAZ domain as the RNA binding domain in RNAi (Nature 2003). His work also addresses the role of histone lysine methylation (Nature Cell Biol. 2008) and long non-coding RNA in the epigenetic control of gene transcription in human stem cell maintenance and differentiation (Mol. Cell 2010).

Zhou's work in rational design of chemical probes for mechanism-driven research led to the discovery of the HIV Tat/human co-activator PCAF interaction as a potential novel anti-HIV therapy target. His group has developed chemical probes that modulate the transcriptional activity of human tumor suppressor p53 under stress conditions. His recent work includes the development of a novel gene transcriptional silencing technology. Additional research discoveries include structural mechanisms as well as drug target discovery and validation for human cancers, particularly triple-negative breast cancer (TNBC), and inflammatory disorders such as inflammatory bowel disease (IBD) and multiple sclerosis.

== Society membership ==
Current and past society memberships include The Harvey Society, the Biophysical Society, the American Chemical Society, the American Society for Biochemistry and Molecular Biology, the American Association for the Advancement of Science and the New York Academy of Sciences. He serves on multiple editorial boards and reviews grants for the American Cancer Society, the American Heart Association, the National Institutes of Health and the National Science Foundation.

== Awards and honors ==
- 2003 GlaxoSmithKline Drug Discovery and Development Award
- 2009 Elected Member, The Academy of Sciences & Arts at Michigan Technological University
- 2019 The Jacobi Medallion, The Mount Sinai Health System

== Patents ==
“Methods of Identifying Modulators of the FGF Receptors”	US 7,108,984 B2
“ZA Loops of Bromodomains”	US 7,589,167 B2
"Method of Suppressing Gene Transcription Through Histone Lysine Methylation"	US 9,249,190 B2; US 10,280,408 B2
"Cyclic Vinylogous Amides as Bromodomain Inhibitors"	US 9,884,806 B2; US 10,351,511 B2
"Methods of Modulating Bromodomains"	US 2004/0009613 A1
