= Deaths in November 2005 =

The following is a list of notable deaths in November 2005.

Entries for each day are listed alphabetically by surname. A typical entry lists information in the following sequence:

- Name, age, country of citizenship at birth, subsequent country of citizenship (if applicable), reason for notability, cause of death (if known), and reference.

== November 2005 ==
=== 1 ===
- Mary Bennett, 92, British academic.
- Skitch Henderson, 87, American pianist, conductor, composer and bandleader (The Tonight Show).
- V. K. Madhavan Kutty, 71, Indian journalist and author.
- John Linville, 62, American racing driver.
- William C. Marshall, 87, British thoroughbred horse racing trainer.
- Carl Mortensen, 86, Norwegian Olympic sailor (1952).
- Desmond Piers, 92, Canadian naval rear admiral.
- Michael Piller, 57, American writer and producer (Star Trek, The Dead Zone, Simon & Simon), cancer.
- Gladys Tantaquidgeon, 106, American Mohegan tribal matriarch.
- Michael Thwaites, 90, Australian poet, writer, naval officer, intelligence officer involved in the Petrov Affair.

=== 2 ===
- Rutherford Aris, 76, American chemical engineer and academic, Parkinson's disease.
- Jean Carson, 82, American actress, (The Andy Griffith Show), stroke.
- John Mieremet, 45, Dutch organized crime leader, shot.
- Rick Rhodes, 54, American film composer and music supervisor, winner of six Emmy Awards, brain cancer.
- Alfred Shaughnessy, 89, English scriptwriter, film director and producer, stroke.
- Lajos Szentgáli, 73, Hungarian athlete and Olympian (1952, 1956).
- Ferruccio Valcareggi, 86, Italian football player and manager (national team).

=== 3 ===
- Kent Andersson, 71, Swedish actor, playwright and theatre director.
- Aenne Burda, 96, German publisher.
- C. P. Ellis, 78, American former Ku Klux Klan member turned civil rights activist.
- R. C. Gorman, 74, American Navajo artist, blood infection and pneumonia.
- Ted Hargreaves, 61, Canadian ice hockey player, coach, teacher, and Olympian (1968).
- Ted Harris, 86, American mathematician.
- Geoffrey Keen, 89, British actor.
- Otto Latsis, 71, Russian journalist, traffic collision.
- Paul Roazen, 69, American professor and historian of psychoanalysis, complications of Crohn's disease.
- John Wittenberg, 66, Australian rugby league footballer.
- Akira Yamamura, 69, Japanese Olympic sailor (1972).

=== 4 ===
- Nick Adduci, 76, American football player (Nebraska Cornhuskers, Washington Redskins).
- Nadia Anjuman, 24, Afghan poet, homicide.
- Michael Erceg, 49, New Zealand businessman, helicopter crash.
- Michael G. Coney, 73, Canadian science fiction author, mesothelioma.
- Bohumil Gregor, 79, Czech conductor.
- Milt Holland, 88, American percussionist, Alzheimer's disease.
- Jamie Irwin, 68, Australian politician.
- Earl Krugel, 62, American JDL activist and convicted criminal, blunt-force trauma.
- Sheree North, 72, American actress, complications following surgery.
- Graham Payn, 87, South African actor, singer and partner of Sir Noël Coward.
- Hiro Takahashi, 41, Japanese singer, multiple organ dysfunction syndrome.
- Amos Thomas, 57, American college basketball player (Oklahoma State Cowboys, Southwestern Oklahoma State Bulldogs).

=== 5 ===
- Peter Brunt, 88, British ancient historian.
- Hugh Alexander Dunn, 82, Australian diplomat, ambassador to Taiwan (1969–1972) and China (1980–1984).
- Frank Emmons, 87, American football player (Oregon Ducks, Philadelphia Eagles).
- John Fowles, 79, British author, after a long illness, stroke.
- Derek Lamb, 69, British animator, Oscar-winning producer, cancer.
- Clyde Palmer, 81, American racing driver.
- Link Wray, 76, American rock and roll guitarist, best known for the 1958 instrumental "Rumble".

=== 6 ===
- Nematollah Aghasi, 66, Iranian singer and songwriter.
- Fidel Arellano, 98, Mexican Olympic wrestler (1932).
- Francesco De Masi, 75, Italian conductor and film score composer, cancer.
- Rod Donald, 48, New Zealand politician, co-leader of the Green Party of Aotearoa New Zealand, viral myocarditis.
- Minako Honda, 38, Japanese pop singer, myeloid leukemia.
- Dick Hutcherson, 73, American former NASCAR driver, heart attack.
- Stevan Larner, 75, American cinematographer and winemaker.
- Theodore Puck, 89, American researcher of genetics, complications from a broken hip.
- Anthony Sawoniuk, 84, Polish-British nazi criminal during World War II.
- Gavril Stoyanov, 76, Bulgarian football player, coach, and Olympian (1956).
- Robert Alexander, Baron Alexander of Weedon, 69, British peer, barrister, banker, and politician, stroke.

=== 7 ===
- Mikhail Gasparov, 70, Russian literary theorist.
- Fraise, 17, American thoroughbred racehorse.
- Nobuhiko Hasegawa, 58, Japanese table tennis player, gardening accident.
- John Nuttall, 86, Anglo-Indian Olympic boxer (1948).
- Harry Thompson, 45, British producer and writer of TV comedies, biographer and novelist, lung cancer.
- Nikolai Trofimov, 85, Soviet and Russian theater and film actor.
- Donald Watson, 87, British wildlife artist.
- Steve Whatley, 46, British theatre actor, consumer expert, journalist and television presenter, suicide.

=== 8 ===
- Alekos Alexandrakis, 77, Greek actor, cancer.
- Lavinia Bazhbeuk-Melikyan, 83, Soviet-Armenian painter.
- Robert Eugene Bush, 79, American U.S. Navy corpsman, youngest sailor awarded a Medal of Honor in World War II, kidney failure.
- Alwyn Cashe, 35, American army senior officer and Medal of Honor recipient, burns from IED.
- Francis Cheetham, 77, British museum director and authority on alabaster.
- Beland Honderich, 86, Canadian newspaper executive, former publisher of Toronto Star, stroke.
- Carola Höhn, 95, German stage and cinema actress.
- Lyle Rockenbach, 90, American football player (Michigan State Spartans, Detroit Lions).
- Dean Sensanbaugher, 80, American football player (Cleveland Browns, New York Bulldogs).
- Ernst Steinhauer, 79, German canoeist and Olympian (1956).
- Truong Nhu Tang, 82, South Vietnamese lawyer and politician.
- David Westheimer, 88, American author, novelist (Von Ryan's Express).
- Glen Wilson, 76, English football player.

=== 9 ===
- Avril Angers, 87, British comedian and actress, pneumonia.
- Azahari Husin, 48, Malaysian technical mastermind of the 2002 and 2005 Bali bombings, gunshot wound.
- Aminata Maïga Ka, 65, Senegalese writer.
- Stephen McGill, 93, Scottish Anglican prelate, Bishop of Paisley (1968–1988).
- K. R. Narayanan, 85, Indian politician, President of India (1997–2002), pneumonia and renal failure.
- Wilhelm Walcher, 95, German physicist.
- Charles R. Weiner, 83, American federal judge who engineered the mass settlement of asbestos lawsuits, kidney failure.

=== 10 ===
- Steve Courson, 50, American football player (Pittsburgh Steelers, Tampa Bay Buccaneers), gardening accident.
- Ernest Crichlow, 91, American artist (Harlem Renaissance), heart failure.
- Janusz Grzemowski, 58, Polish Olympic luger (1972).
- A.Z.M. Enayetullah Khan, 66, Bangladeshi journalist and government minister, pancreatic cancer.
- Domingo Matom, 50, American classical ballet dancer, melanoma.
- Gardner Read, 92, American composer.
- Joyce Richards, 84, British Olympic canoeist (1948).
- Vidar Sandbeck, 87, Norwegian folk singer, composer, and writer.
- Carlo Testi, 102, Italian painter.
- Ted Wragg, 67, British professor of education and commentator on education topics, heart attack.

=== 11 ===
- Moustapha Akkad, 75, Syrian-born American film producer (Halloween films), injuries sustained in Jordanian bombings.
- Keith Andes, 85, American actor (Tora! Tora! Tora!), suicide by asphyxiation.
- Terry Cole, 60, American gridiron football player (Baltimore Colts, Pittsburgh Steelers, Miami Dolphins).
- Maurits Coppieters, 85, Belgian politician.
- Peter Drucker, 95, Austrian-American management theorist.
- Pamela Duncan, 73, American B-movie and TV actress, stroke.
- Miguel Gallardo, 56, Spanish singer-songwriter, kidney cancer.
- Jean-François Gravier, 90, French geographer.
- Brosl Hasslacher, 64, American theoretical physicist.
- Patrick Anson, 5th Earl of Lichfield, 66, British peer and photographer, stroke.
- Murugappa Channaveerappa Modi, 89, Indian ophthalmologist.
- David Pingree, 72, American historian of mathematics in the ancient world.
- Eduardo Rabossi, 75, Argentine philosopher and human rights activist.

=== 12 ===
- Cosme Barrutia, 76, Spanish cyclist.
- Arthur K. Cebrowski, 63, American Navy vice admiral and Pentagon official, cancer.
- Madhu Dandavate, 81, Indian socialist leader.
- Wilbert Hiller, 90, Canadian ice hockey player.
- Cosme Barrutia Iturriagoitia, 76, Spanish cyclist.
- Kazimierz Lipień, 56, Polish featherweight Greco-Roman wrestler and Olympic champion (1972, 1976, 1980).
- Frank Minini, 83, American football player (Chicago Bears, Pittsburgh Steelers).
- Zamanbek Nurkadilov, 61, Kazakh politician, suicide.
- Jori Smith, 98, Canadian modernist artist.
- Moise Vass, 85, Romanian football player.
- Joe Wade, 84, English football player and manager.

=== 13 ===
- William B. Bryant, 94, American senior federal judge and the first black federal prosecutor in U.S. history.
- Florence Bucior, 85, American baseball player.
- Vine Deloria, Jr., 72, Native American author and activist, aortic aneurysm.
- Harry Gold, 98, Irish jazz musician.
- Eddie Guerrero, 38, Mexican-American WWE professional wrestler, heart failure.
- Charles Owen Rice, 96, American Roman Catholic priest and labor activist.
- Miriam Roth, 95, Israeli writer and educator.
- Ruth Siems, 74, American home economist, inventor of Stove Top stuffing.
- Tan Chin Tuan, 96, Singaporean banker and philanthropist.
- Paul Langdon Ward, 94, American historian, president of the American Historical Association and Sarah Lawrence College.

=== 14 ===
- Svein Bergersen, 75, Norwegian footballer.
- John P. Campo, 67, American champion horse trainer.
- Ahmed Mamsa, 86, Indian cricket umpire.
- Erich Schanko, 86, German footballer.
- Anja Secrève, 88, Dutch fencer and Olympian (1948).
- Jenő Takács, 103, Hungarian classical composer and pianist.

=== 15 ===
- Barry K. Atkins, 94, American Navy admiral and decorated World War II veteran.
- Roy Brooks, 67, American jazz drummer.
- Felipe de Alba, 81, Mexican actor.
- Hanne Haller, 55, German "schlager" singer, breast cancer.
- Agenore Incrocci, 86, Italian screenwriter, heart attack.
- Bertil Johansson, 76, Swedish footballer.
- Raja Nawathe, 81, Indian Hindi film producer.
- Adrian Rogers, 74, American religious leader, complications of colon cancer.
- Agapito Sánchez, 35, Dominican junior featherweight boxing champion, shot.
- Louis Sévèke, 41, Dutch left wing political activist, shot.
- Preston Robert Tisch, 79, American businessman, co-owner of the NFL's New York Giants, brain cancer.
- Donald Tytler, 81, Canadian Olympic sailor (1952, 1956).
- Ren Zhongyi, 91, Chinese politician.

=== 16 ===
- Bill Bray, 80, American bodyguard (Michael Jackson). (death announced on this date)
- Sandy Consuegra, 85, Cuban baseball pitcher.
- Ronald Crichton, 91, Music critic for the Financial Times in the 1960s and 1970s.
- Marina Denikina, 86, Russian-French writer and journalist.
- Ralph Edwards, 92, American television host and producer, heart failure.
- Ed Karpowich, 93, American football player (Pittsburgh Pirates).
- Richard Moore, 95, American sailor and Olympic champion (1932).
- Paul Noel, 81, American basketball player (Kentucky Wildcats, New York Knicks, Rochester Royals), cancer.
- Henry Taube, 89, Canadian-American chemist and Nobel Prize Laureate.
- Henk van Woerden, 57, Dutch painter and writer with close ties to South Africa, heart attack.
- Donald Watson, 95, English animal rights and veganism advocate who co-founded The Vegan Society.

=== 17 ===
- Béla Czafik, 68, Hungarian Olympic volleyball player (1964).
- Igor Vasilyevich Ivanov, 58, Russian-Canadian chess grandmaster, cancer.
- Marek Perepeczko, 63, Polish actor, heart attack.
- Wang Qiang, 30, Chinese serial killer, rapist and robber, execution by shooting.
- Sybil Louise Shearer, 93, American modern dance choreographer, stroke.
- Gennaro Verolino, 99, Roman Catholic bishop and a diplomat for the Holy See.

=== 18 ===
- Alfonso Arana, 78, Puerto Rican painter, Parkinson's disease.
- Sandy Blythe, 43, Australian wheelchair basketball player, suicide.
- Gérard Crombac, 76, Swiss journalist and author on auto racing.
- Hussein el-Shafei, 87, Egyptian military officer.
- Laura Hidalgo, 78, Argentine actress.
- Whitall Perry, 85, American author.
- Harold J. Stone, 92, American actor (Welcome Back, Kotter, Somebody Up There Likes Me).
- Lee Yoon-hyung, 26, South Korean millionaire, heiress of Samsung, suicide by hanging.

=== 19 ===
- Artine Artinian, 97, French literary scholar.
- Erik Balling, 80, Danish TV and film director, heart attack.
- Steve Belichick, 86, American football player (Detroit Lions), and coach.
- Bob Enevoldsen, 85, American jazz tenor saxophonist and valve trombonist.
- Rodney Hughes, 80, American politician.
- Jaime Itlman, 81, Chilean Olympic sprinter (1948).
- Ferdinand Rabeder, 74, Austrian Olympic rower (1956).
- Willy Schultes, 85, German actor and writer.
- Francesco Somaini, 79, Italian sculptor.
- Karen Ter-Martirosian, 83, Soviet and Russian theoretical physicist.
- John Timpson, 77, British journalist, ex-presenter of the Today programme on BBC Radio 4.

=== 20 ===
- Muhammad Said al-Attar, 78, Yemeni politician, Prime Minister (1994).
- Manouchehr Atashi, 74, Iranian poet.
- Roberto Camacho Weberberg, 54, Colombian politician, member of the Chamber of Representatives (1990-2002), helicopter crash.
- Nora Denney, 77, American actress, illness, cancer.
- John Hanna, 70, Canadian ice hockey defenceman (New York Rangers, Montreal Canadiens, Philadelphia Flyers), and coach.
- Jonathan James-Moore, 59, English theatre manager, former BBC Radio head of light entertainment, cancer.
- James King, 80, American operatic tenor.
- Harry Lawton, 77, American writer.
- Lou Myers, 90, American cartoonist (The New Yorker).
- Fritz Richmond, 66, American musician and recording engineer, lung cancer.
- Chris Whitley, 45, American musician, lung cancer.

=== 21 ===
- Alfred Anderson, 109, Scottish World War I veteran, oldest living man in Scotland and last survivor of the 1914 Christmas truce.
- Albert H. Bosch, 97, American politician, Republican U.S. Representative from New York (1953–1960).
- Aileen Fox, 98, English archaeologist.
- Sonny Hutchins, 76, American racing driver.
- John W. Mitchell, 88, British sound engineer.
- Hugh Sidey, 78, American journalist, Time magazine, heart attack.
- Umrao Singh, 85, Indian non-commissioned officer, last surviving Indian recipient of the Victoria Cross, prostate cancer.

=== 22 ===
- Frank Gatski, 83, American football player (Cleveland Browns, Detroit Lions) and member of the Pro Football Hall of Fame, heart disease.
- Bruce Hobbs, 84, British jockey and race horse trainer.
- Ken Mackintosh, 86, English saxophonist, composer and bandleader.
- Harmesh Malhotra, 69, Indian film director, producer, and screenplay writer.
- Edith Soppe, 44, Argentine chess player.
- Özker Özgür, 65, Turkish-Cypriot politician.
- Joseph J. Thorndike, 92, American editor and writer.

=== 23 ===
- Ingvil Aarbakke, 35, Norwegian artist, cancer.
- Mike Austin, 95, American golfer.
- Alfred Blaser, 92, Swiss Olympic equestrian (1948).
- Constance Cummings, 95, American-British actress.
- Isabel de Castro, 74, Portuguese actress, cancer.
- Marty Furgol, 89, American golfer.
- Nate Hawthorne, 55, American pro basketball player (Southern Illinois Salukis, Los Angeles Lakers, Phoenix Suns), heart attack.
- Beverly Tyler, 78, American film actress and singer.

=== 24 ===
- Jamuna Barua, 86, Indian actress.
- Günther Deckert, 55, East German Nordic combined Olympic skier (1972, 1976).
- Buzz Dozier, 77, American baseball player (Washington Senators).
- John Borden Hamilton, 92, Canadian politician, member of the House of Commons of Canada (1954-1962).
- Pat Morita, 73, American actor (The Karate Kid, Happy Days, Mulan), kidney failure.
- Zoltán Szalontai, 49, Hungarian Olympic wrestler (1980).
- Harry Thürk, 78, German writer.
- John Vlissides, 44, American software scientist and author, one of the "Gang of Four", complications of a brain tumor.

=== 25 ===
- Alfredo Angeli, 78, Italian director and screenwriter.
- Ivan Antić, 81, Serbian architect and academic.
- Andria Apakidze, 91, Georgian archaeologist and historian.
- George Best, 59, Northern Irish football player (Manchester United, Northern Ireland), multiple organ failure.
- Roy Bjørnstad, 80, Norwegian actor.
- Élisabeth Boselli, 91, French military and civilian pilot.
- Richard Burns, 34, British rally driver (2001 World Rally Championship champion), brain tumor.
- Mal Mallette, 83, American baseball player (Brooklyn Dodgers).
- Erich Moritz, 65, Austrian Olympic sailor (1960, 1972).
- Pierre Seel, 82, French Holocaust survivor, cancer.
- Yoshio Shiga, 91, Japanese navy officer and flying ace during World War II.
- Hassan Hosni Tawfik, 94, Egyptian fencer and Olympian (1936, 1948, 1952).
- Jerry Lynn Williams, 57, American rock music singer and composer, kidney and liver failure.

=== 26 ===
- Takanori Arisawa, 54, Japanese composer, bladder cancer.
- Colin Brinded, 59, British snooker referee, cancer.
- Mark Craney, 53, American rock and jazz drummer, pneumonia.
- Gopal Godse, 86, Indian last surviving conspirator in the assassination of Mahatma Gandhi.
- Santiago Morales, 54, Spanish Olympic wrestler (1980).
- Ingálvur av Reyni, 84, Faroese painter.
- David Tabor, 92, British physicist.
- Karl Wolf, 81, German footballer.
- Bruno H. Zimm, 85, American chemist.

=== 27 ===
- Jocelyn Brando, 86, American actress.
- Rudolf Cvek, 59, Croatian footballer.
- William S. Hatcher, 70, American mathematician, philosopher, and a member of the Baháʼí faith.
- Joe Jones, 79, American R&B singer, composer, complications from coronary artery bypass surgery.
- Frederick R. McManus, 82, American Roman Catholic priest and academic.
- Franz Schönhuber, 82, German politician (Die Republikaner party), pulmonary embolism.
- Lys Symonette, 90, American pianist and musical stage performer.
- Kazu Wakita, 97, Japanese painter.

=== 28 ===
- Donald V. Bennett, 90, American general, former commandant U.S. Military Academy.
- Jack Concannon, 62, American football player, former NFL quarterback, heart attack.
- Carl Forssell, 88, Swedish fencer and Olympic medalist (1948, 1952, 1956).
- Henry Grover, 78, American politician, Alzheimer's disease.
- Marc Lawrence, 95, American actor (subjected to the Hollywood blacklist in the 1940s/50s), heart failure.
- Tony Meehan, 62, British former Shadows drummer, head injury.
- John Mellus, 88, American gridiron football player (New York Giants, San Francisco 49ers, Baltimore Colts).
- Helen Muir, 85, British rheumatologist.
- Eric Nance, 45, American convicted murderer, execution by lethal injection.
- D. R. Shackleton Bailey, 87, British scholar of Latin literature, Alzheimer's disease.
- Tarsem Singh, 58, Indian field hockey player and Olympian (1968).
- E. Cardon "Card" Walker, 89, American CEO of Walt Disney Productions (1976-1983), congestive heart failure.

=== 29 ===
- Robert E. Brown, 78, American ethnomusicologist, complications of cancer.
- David Di Tommaso, 26, French soccer player, cardiac arrest, heart attack.
- Abdel Qader El-Touni, 81, Egyptian Olympic weightlifter (1952, 1960).
- Joseph Furst, 89, Austrian actor.
- Józef Garliński, 92, Polish historian and writer.
- Mike Gibbons, 54, American football player (New York Giants).
- John R. Hicks, 49, American convicted murderer, execution by lethal injection.
- Don Keenan, 67, Canadian ice hockey player (Boston Bruins).
- Uffe Schultz Larsen, 84, Danish Olympic shooter (1948, 1952, 1956, 1960).
- István Liszkay, 92, Hungarian Olympic cyclist (1936).
- Macon McCalman, 72, American actor (Smokey and the Bandit, Falling Down, Doc Hollywood), complications from a series of strokes.
- Victor Pellot, 78, Puerto Rican baseball player (Minnesota Twins) and Gold Glove winning first baseman, cancer.
- Wendie Jo Sperber, 47, American actress (Back to the Future, Bosom Buddies, Bachelor Party), breast cancer.
- Deon van der Walt, 47, South African operatic tenor, shot.

=== 30 ===
- Roger Behm, 76, Luxembourgian Olympic boxer (1948).
- Viggo Jensen, 84, Danish footballer and Olympian (1948).
- Denis Lindsay, 66, South African cricketer, long illness.
- Kenneth Macksey, 82, British author and historian.
- Petre Moldoveanu, 80, Romanian footballer and manager.
- Jean Parker, 90, American actress (Little Women), stroke.
- Herbert L. Strock, 87, American B-movie director, heart failure.
- Than Tun, 82, Burmese historian and outspoken critic of the military junta of Burma.
- B. J. Young, 28, American ice hockey player (Detroit Red Wings), traffic collision.
