= Xenia Denikina =

Russian writer (1892–1973)

- Ксения Деникина
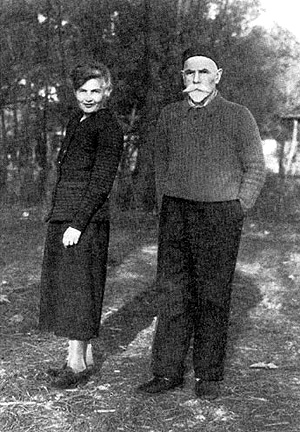
- Xenia Denikina and Anton Denikin, 1930s.
- Born: Xenia Vasilyevna Chizh; 2 April 1892; Biała Podlaska, Siedlce Governorate, Vistula Land, Russian Empire (now Biała Podlaska, Poland)
- Died: 3 March 1973 (aged 80); Louviers, France
- Other names: Ksenia Chizh, Ksenia Denikina, K. V. Denikina
- Occupations: College professor, writer
- Spouse: Anton Denikin
- Children: Marina Denikina

Xenia Vasilievna Denikina (Note: Russian: Ксе́ния Васи́льевна Дени́кина, romanized: Kseniya Vasilyevna Denikina) (née Chizh; (Note: Russian: Чиж) 2 April [O.S. 21 March] 1892 – 3 March 1973) was a Russian writer. From 1918 until his death in 1947, she was married to Anton Denikin.

== Early life ==
Xenia Chizh (Note: Often transcribed as Tchije) was born in Biała Podlaska, then part of Congress Poland in the Russian Empire. Her father was Vassili Ivanovich Chizh, an artillery officer and local official, and her mother was Elisaveta Alexandrovna Toumskaya. She graduated from the Institute for Young Ladies in Warsaw, and was training to be a teacher when she started a relationship with Anton Denikin.

== Career ==
Denikina and her family went into exile in 1920, living eventually in France and Belgium, where she helped her husband write his memoirs. The couple took refuge in Mimizan in World War II, and she was briefly arrested and imprisoned by the Germans. She acted as an interpreter between the German occupiers and the Russian, Polish, and Ukrainian exiles there. Denikina kept a hidden journal from 1940 to 1945, totalling 28 school notebooks by the end. The Denikins moved to New York City after the war. Her husband died in Ann Arbor, Michigan in 1947.

Denikina was chair of the Russian Institutes Alumnae Association when it was founded in 1954. She assisted Russian history scholars, organized her husband's papers, and hosted cultural events for the Russian émigré community in New York.

== Personal life and legacy ==
Xenia Chizh married a White Army general, Anton Denikin, in 1918. They had a daughter, Marina Denikina, born in 1919. Xenia Denikina became an American citizen in 1951, returned to France in 1971, and died at Louviers in 1973, aged 80 years. Her daughter translated Denikina's wartime journal into French and published it in 1976, as Mimizan-sur-Guerre, Le Journal de ma mère sous l'Occupation. It was called "a unique portrait of émigré fortunes at their lowest ebb". Her remains and those of her husband were reinterred at Donskoy Monastery in Moscow in 2005, just before Marina's death that year. Her papers, and her husband's, are in the Bakhmeteff Archive of Russian and East European Culture at Columbia University Libraries.
