= Political positions of Anton Denikin =

Anton Denikin's policies are the political activities carried out by Lieutenant General Anton Denikin during the period of his control of the forces of the White movement in the South of Russia in 1918–1920. It determined the policy and nature of the organization of the state, administrative and military authorities of the Volunteer Army and the Armed Forces of South Russia (VSYuR) in the territories under its control during the Civil War.

== General principles ==
In the territories controlled by the VSYuR, all power belonged to Denikin as commander-in-chief. Under him, there was a Special Conference, which exercised the functions of executive and legislative power. Possessing essentially dictatorial power and being a supporter of a constitutional monarchy, Denikin did not consider himself entitled (until the convocation of the Constituent Assembly) to predetermine Russia's future state structure. He tried to rally the broadest possible sections of the population around the white movement under the slogans "Fight against Bolshevism to the end", "Great, united and indivisible Russia", "Political freedoms", "Law and order". This position was criticized both from the right, from the monarchists, and from the left, from the liberal socialist camp. The call to recreate a united and indivisible Russia met with resistance from the Don and Kuban Cossack state formations, which sought autonomy and a federal structure for the future Russia, and could not be supported by the nationalist parties of Ukraine, Transcaucasus and the Baltic states.

The implementation of Denikin's power was unstable. Although formally power belonged to the military, who based on the army shaped the politics of the White South, in practice Denikin failed to establish firm order either in the controlled territories or in the army.

== Workers question ==
At the same time, attempts were made in the rear of the whites to establish a peaceful life. Where the situation permitted, plants and factories were returned to their former owners and work resumed, rail and water transport links restored, banks opened and free trade restored. Fixed prices for agricultural products were established, a law on criminal liability for speculation was approved, the courts, the prosecutor's office and the bar association were restored in their previous form, self-government bodies of the city were elected, many political parties, even the Social Revolutionaries and Social Democrats, operated with relative freedom. Almost unrestricted freedom of the press was allowed. Denikin's Special Conference adopted progressive labor legislation with an 8-hour working day and labor protection measures, which, however, due to the complete collapse of industrial production, did not find practical implementation.

At the same time, any workers' demonstrations and strikes were considered exclusively political and were suppressed by force, and the independence of trade unions was not recognized.

== Agrarian question ==
Denikin's government did not have time to fully implement the land reform he had developed, which was supposed to be based on the strengthening of small and medium-sized farms at the expense of state and landlord lands. There was a temporary Kolchak law prescribing, before the Constituent Assembly, the preservation of land for those owners in whose hands it actually was. In modern Russian and Ukrainian historiography, in contrast to the earlier Soviet one, it is not customary to call Denikin's agrarian legislation focused on protecting the interests of landlord landownership. At the same time, the Denikin government failed to completely prevent the spontaneous return of land ownership with all its negative consequences for the implementation of agrarian reforms.

== National policy ==
=== National question ===
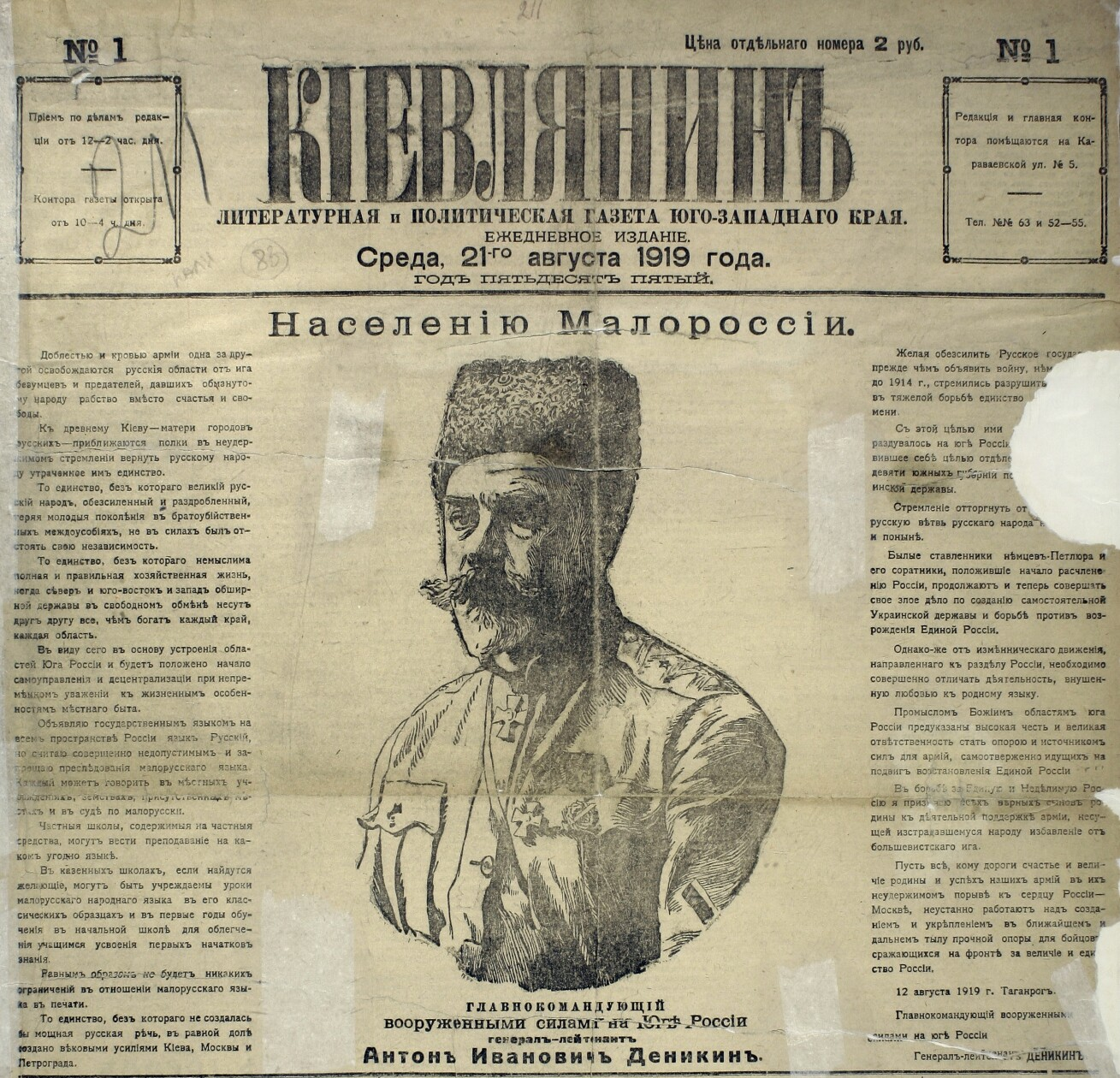
Denikin's appeal "To the Inhabitants of Little Russia", published in the newspaper Kievlyanin on 21 August 1919

In national politics, Denikin adhered to the concept of "one and indivisible Russia", which did not allow to discuss any autonomy or self-determination of the territories that were part of the former Russian Empire within the pre-war borders. One of the main national issues on Denikin's agenda, as leader of the forces that occupied most of Ukraine's territory in 1919, was the Ukrainian question. On 12 August 1919, in Taganrog, with the participation of the publicist Vasily Shulgin, the history teacher Pavel Novgorodtsev and other public figures, an "Appeal to the population of Little Russia" was prepared, which was later published in all parts in the White Guard press from the cities of southern Russia, controlled by the VSYuR. The appeal formulated the principles of the national policy of whites in relation to the territory and population of Ukraine in 1919.

=== Jewish question ===
According to Denikin's own memoirs, he knew that Jewish soldiers "were subjected to constant ridicule" and his comrades did not want to live in the same room with them and eat from the same cauldron. Denikin argued that in order not to subject Jews to moral and physical torment, he was forced to issue an order prohibiting Jews from joining the Volunteer Army in officer positions. Although Denikin did not issue a similar order regarding soldiers, artificially inflated requirements for Jewish recruits accepted into the army led to the fact that the question of the participation of Jews in the VSYuR "decided by itself." Denikin himself repeatedly appealed to his commanders "not to turn one nationality against another", but the weakness of his power on the ground was such that he could not prevent pogroms, especially in conditions when various influential bodies in the territories controlled by the VSYuR, and even part of the military administration itself (Orthodox religious institutions, the OSVAG propaganda agency) carried out an anti-Jewish agitation: they put an equal sign between Bolshevism and the Jewish population and called for a "crusade" against the Jews.

However, only in Ukraine, representatives of the White Army carried out 400 pogroms (approximately 20% of the total number of pogroms in this territory), while not only soldiers, but also officers took part in the pogrom movement, and one of the features of these pogroms was mass rape, from which affected from 50 to 100% of the female population of shtetls. In addition, the practice of taking Jews as hostages.

== Foreign policy ==
Denikin in his foreign policy was guided by the recognition of the state formation under his control by the Entente countries. The fragmentation of the military and political forces in the South of Russia in 1918, as well as the cooperation of the Don Cossacks with Germany, made it difficult for the forces operating in this region to receive help from the allies. With the consolidation of his power at the end of 1918 and the formation of the VsYuR in January 1919, Denikin managed to enlist the support of the Entente. In the middle of 1919, after the start of the retreat of Kolchak, on whom the Entente had previously pinned hopes, Denikin recognized the supremacy of Kolchak and thus began to be considered by the Allied Powers as the representative of the Supreme Ruler in the South, which increased the scale of Allied assistance.

With the failures of Kolchak and the shift of the center of white power in the second half of 1919 to the South of Russia, Denikin's cooperation with the Entente was further strengthened. During his rule, Denikin did not set the task of international recognition of his government by the Entente, these issues were already resolved by his successor Wrangel in 1920.

== Internal disputes ==
Denikin had a negative attitude towards the idea of forming a coalition legislative government of anti-Bolshevik forces in the South of Russia. On 15 August 1919, he told the representatives of the South Russian Conference (who worked to unite the White Guard governments of the South of Russia): "I will not allow a many-headed Soviet of Deputies to stand over my head." He was skeptical about the state abilities of his Don and Kuban allies, believing that the territory subordinate to him "could give a representative body intellectually no higher than the provincial zemstvo assembly".

From the middle of 1919, a major conflict arose between Denikin and one of the top military leaders of the Volunteer Army, Pyotr Wrangel. The contradictions were not of a political nature: the reasons for the disagreements were the difference in the vision of the two generals on the issue of choosing allies and the subsequent strategy for the forces of the white movement in the south of Russia, which quickly became in mutual accusations and diametrically opposed assessments of the same facts.

The starting point of the conflict arose in April 1919 as a result of Denikin's ignorance of Wrangel's secret report, in which he proposed to give priority to the direction of the offensive of the white armies by Tsaritsyn. Denikin later issued the Moscow offensive directive which, after its failure, was publicly criticized by Wrangel. At the end of 1919, an open confrontation broke out between the generals, Wragnel probed the ground to replace General Denikin, but in January 1920 he resigned, left the territory of the VSYuR and went to Constantinople, staying there until the spring of 1920.

The conflict between Denikin and Wrangel contributed to a split in the white camp, and he also continued in exile. Later, the history of the conflict was described in detail by both generals in their memoirs: by Denikin in Essays on Russian Troubles and by Wrangel in Notes (which are sometimes perceived as Wrangel's reply to the last volume of Denikin's Essays).

== Role in the White Terror ==
Historian Alter Lytvyn writes that the repressive policies of the Denikin government were similar to those of Kolchak and other military dictatorships. Police functions in the territories controlled by Denikin were carried out by the State Guard, and by September 1919 their number reached almost 78,000 people, despite the fact that the entire army during this period consisted of 110,000 bayonets and sabers. At the same time, on his books, Denikin completely denied his involvement in any repressive measures. "We, both myself and the military commanders", he wrote, "issued orders to combat violence, robbery, prisoner robbery, etc." Denikin transferred the responsibility for organizing a repressive policy in the south of Russia to the initiative of counterintelligence from him, arguing that it became "sometimes centers of provocation and organized robbery."

In August 1918, Denikin ordered that "all persons accused of aiding or favoring the troops or authorities of the Soviet Republic in their military actions or other hostile actions against the Volunteer Army, as well as premeditated murder, rape, robbery, robbery, deliberate arson or sinking of other people's property", take "to the field military courts of the military unit of the Volunteer Army, by order of the military governor". At the same time, Denikin, for his own propaganda purposes, took up the task of studying and documenting the results of the Red Terror.

On 4 April 1919, by his order, a Special Investigative Commission was created to investigate the atrocities of the Bolsheviks. In mid-1919, the repressive legislation was tightened with the adoption of the "Law Concerning Participants in the Establishment of Soviet Power in the Russian State, as well as Those Who Deliberately Contributed to its Spread and Consolidation", according to which the persons clearly involved in the establishment of Soviet power were subject to the death penalty, complicitly provided with "indefinite forced labor", or "forced labor from 4 to 20 years", or "correctional penitentiary departments from 2 to 6 years", by minor violations – imprisonment from a month to 1 year 4 months or "monetary penalty" from 300,000 to 20,000 rubles. In addition, Denikin excluded "fear of possible coercion" from the "disclaimer" section, as, according to his ruling, it was "difficult for the court to catch".

Historian Vasily Tsvetkov writes that Denikin's repressive legislation in 1919 was tougher than Kolchak's, and it was drawn up based on the "inevitability and severity of punishment" for members of Bolshevik organizations, as well as all those who supported the Bolshevik Party and Soviet power. According to the author, such radicalism could be explained, among other things, by the results of the work of the Special Investigative Commission to Investigate the Atrocities of the Bolsheviks, already known by that time, which described the facts of numerous cases of the Red Terror in the territories controlled by the VSYuR, which in turn led to a tougher reaction to the Soviet government command VSYuR, in comparison with other state formations of Whites.
