= Anton Denikin =

Russian military and political leader (1872–1947)

- Антон Деникин
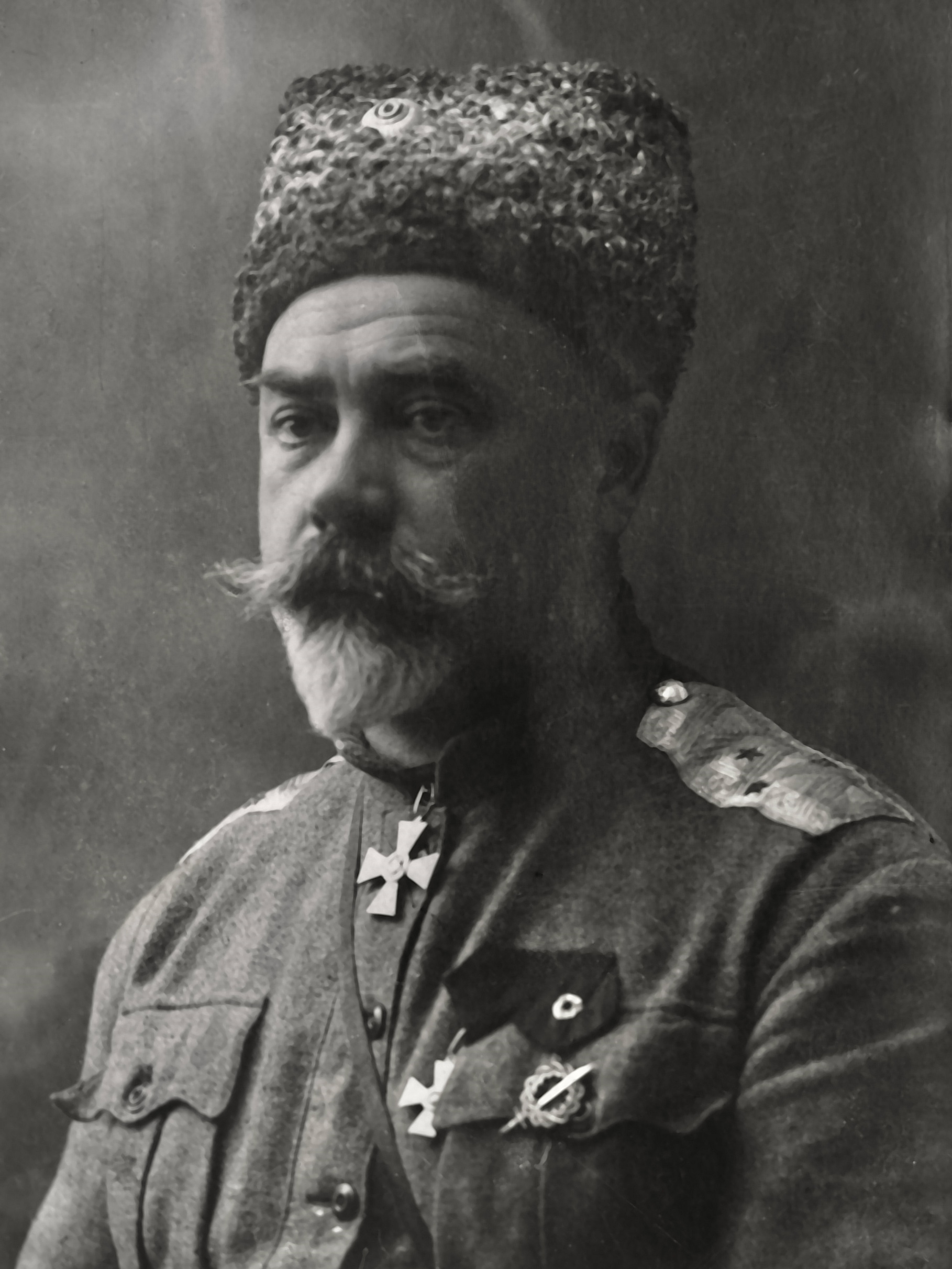
- Denikin in 1919

Commander-in-Chief of the Armed Forces of South Russia
- In office 8 January 1919 – 4 April 1920
- Preceded by: Office established
- Succeeded by: Pyotr Wrangel

Supreme Ruler of Russia
- Acting
- In office 4 January – 4 April 1920
- Preceded by: Alexander Kolchak
- Succeeded by: Office abolished

Personal details
- Born: 16 December 1872 Włocławek, Warsaw Governorate, Russian Empire (now Włocławek, Poland)
- Died: 7 August 1947 (aged 74) Ann Arbor, Michigan, United States
- Spouse: Xenia Chizh
- Relations: Marina Denikina (daughter)
- Awards: See below

Military service
- Allegiance: (Russian Empire) Imperial Russia (1890–1917) (South Russia (1919–1920)) White Movement in Southern Russia (1917–1920)
- Branch/service: Imperial Russian Army (South Russia (1919–1920)) White Army
- Years of service: 1890–1920
- Rank: Lieutenant general
- Battles/wars: Russo-Japanese War; World War I; Russian Civil War; Kuban Offensive; Advance on Moscow (1919)

Anton Ivanovich Denikin (Russian: Анто́н Ива́нович Дени́кин; 16 December [O.S. 4 December] 1872 – 7 August 1947) was a Russian military officer who served as a lieutenant general in the Imperial Russian Army and as a leading commander of the anti-Bolshevik White movement during the Russian Civil War.

A veteran of the Russo-Japanese War and a highly decorated commander in World War I, Denikin rose to prominence for his leadership of the "Iron Brigade". Following the February Revolution, he became a vocal critic of the Russian Provisional Government's military policies. After the October Revolution, he was a co-founder of the anti-Bolshevik Volunteer Army in South Russia. He assumed command of the army in April 1918 and became the Commander-in-Chief of the Armed Forces of South Russia (AFSR) in January 1919.

In mid-1919, Denikin's forces launched the Moscow offensive, a major assault that captured large swathes of territory and advanced to within 350 kilometres (220 miles) of the capital, representing the high-water mark of the White movement. However, the offensive was ultimately defeated by a Red Army counter-attack. The defeat was attributed to several factors, including overstretched supply lines and the White movement's political failures. Denikin's government, the Special Council, failed to implement an effective land reform policy to win the support of the peasantry, while its uncompromising slogan of "a great, united, and indivisible Russia" alienated potential allies, including the Cossacks and various national minorities. The territories under Denikin's control were also ravaged by waves of brutal antisemitic pogroms, which he failed to suppress, discrediting the movement internationally and eroding its internal discipline.

After a disastrous retreat, Denikin resigned his command to General Pyotr Wrangel in April 1920 and went into exile. He lived in France and, after World War II, in the United States. He dedicated his life in exile to writing, producing a multi-volume memoir, The Russian Turmoil, and other historical works. A staunch Russian patriot and an opponent of communism, Denikin urged Russian émigrés to support the Red Army in defending their homeland against Nazi Germany during World War II. He remains a controversial figure in Russian history, remembered for his military skill and personal courage, but criticized as an inflexible and politically inept leader whose defeat was a crucial factor in the Bolshevik victory.

== Early life and career ==
=== Childhood and education ===
Anton Denikin was born on 4 December 1872 in Włocławek, a town in the Warsaw Governorate of the Russian Empire (present-day Poland). His father, Ivan Efimovich Denikin, was born a peasant serf in the province of Saratov. At the age of 27, Ivan was conscripted into the army and served for 25 years during the reign of Nicholas I. He was promoted to officer in 1856 and retired with the rank of major in 1869. In 1871, at the age of 64, he married his second wife, Elżbieta Wrzesińska, a Polish Catholic woman from a family of impoverished small landowners. The family lived in poverty on Ivan's small pension of 36 rubles a month.

Despite the strained Russo-Polish relations of the time, the family was bilingual and bicultural. His father was a devoutly religious man of the Russian Orthodox Church, and Anton was raised in the Orthodox faith, serving as an altar boy from an early age. His mother spoke Polish at home and was Roman Catholic. This mixed heritage occasionally led to friction; in one incident, a local Catholic priest refused Elżbieta communion and demanded she raise her son as a Catholic and a Pole, an intrusion Ivan Denikin angrily rebuffed.

Ivan Denikin died of cancer in 1885, leaving his family with a curtailed pension of only 20 rubles a month. At the age 13, Anton began tutoring younger pupils to supplement the family's income. The family's financial situation improved two years later when they were authorized to operate a boarding house for students of the local Realschule, where Anton was an excellent student and was appointed monitor. Influenced by his father's military background, he chose a military career and, after graduating in 1889, enlisted as a private before entering the Kiev officer candidate school in the autumn of 1890.

=== Early military service ===
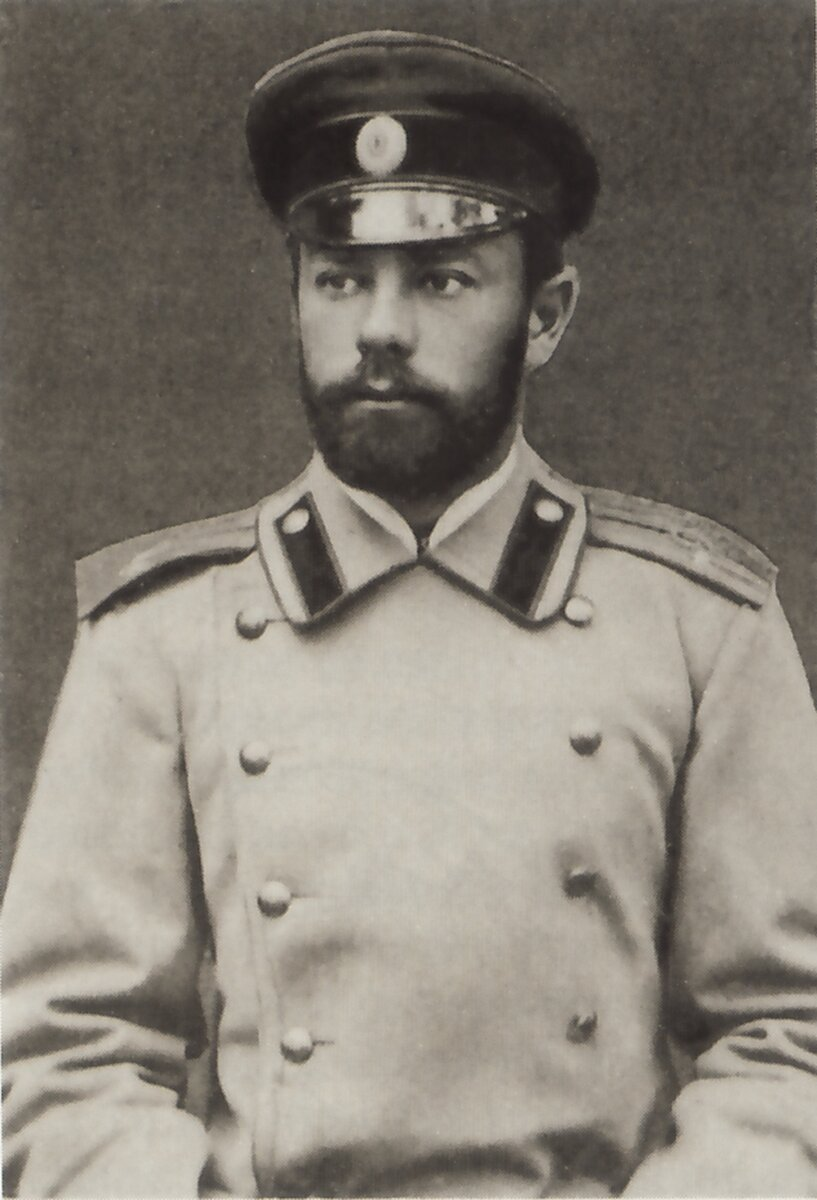
Denikin in 1895

After completing a two-year course, Denikin was commissioned as a second lieutenant and assigned to the 2nd Field Artillery Brigade stationed in Biała Podlaska. Life in the remote provincial garrison was drab and culturally limited, with the officer corps forming a self-contained social circle. Denikin, however, devoted himself to his artillery service and his studies, preparing for the entrance examinations for the Academy of the General Staff.

In the autumn of 1895, after several years of preparation, Denikin passed the competitive examinations and was admitted to the Academy. Upon graduating, he was entitled to an appointment to the General Staff. However, the new head of the Academy, General Nikolai Sukhotin, arbitrarily altered the list of appointments, and Denikin's name was removed. Denikin, feeling a grave injustice had been committed, filed a formal complaint to the Emperor himself, an unprecedented move for a junior officer. The affair became a cause célèbre in St. Petersburg. The Academy's council ruled that Sukhotin's actions were illegal, and Denikin and the other affected officers were offered appointments on the condition that they withdraw the complaint. Denikin indignantly refused, stating, "I am not asking for favors, but only claiming that which is due me by right." As a result, he was not appointed to the General Staff.

Two years later, in 1902, after passions had subsided, Denikin wrote a personal letter to the Minister of War, Aleksey Kuropatkin, who had approved Sukhotin's actions. Kuropatkin reviewed the case, realized he had been wrong, and secured the Tsar's permission for Denikin's appointment to the General Staff. After two years in Biała Podlaska, Denikin was transferred, serving in various staff positions in the Warsaw military district before the outbreak of the Russo-Japanese War.

== Russo-Japanese War and 1905 Revolution ==
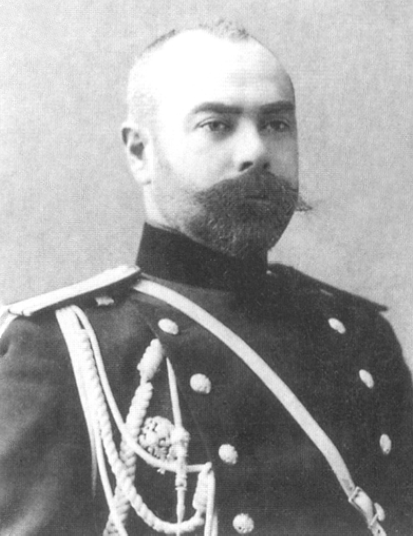
Denikin in 1906

When the Russo-Japanese War began in February 1904 with a surprise attack on Port Arthur, Denikin, a captain, considered it his patriotic duty to go to the front. He requested a transfer to the theatre of operations and started for Manchuria at the end of the month.

Denikin served as chief of staff for several brigades and divisions. He distinguished himself for personal bravery and his ability to make quick assessments of combat situations. In November 1904, in the battle of Tsinkhechen, he led a successful bayonet counterattack, for which a hill was named "Denikin's sopka" in his honour. He was promoted to lieutenant colonel and then to colonel. He also served with the mounted detachment of General Pavel Mishchenko and took part in a successful raid on the enemy's rearguard positions in May 1905, which raised the morale of the Russian army.

The war's unpopularity and a series of defeats fueled growing resentment in Russia, culminating in the 1905 Russian Revolution. Denikin experienced the chaos firsthand while returning from the front on the Trans-Siberian Railway. Demobilized reservists, influenced by anti-government propaganda, rioted along the line, creating anarchy. Denikin and three other colonels organized a small armed unit of officers, requisitioned an engine, and forced their way through to St. Petersburg in January 1906. This experience taught him a valuable lesson: "In a period of anarchy and government disintegration, even a small fist is to be reckoned with."

Denikin welcomed the October Manifesto of 1905, which promised a constitution and a national assembly (the State Duma), as a necessary step away from anachronistic autocracy. He believed it provided a basis for political and civic freedom. Politically, he defined his views as liberal, favouring a constitutional monarchy. He supported the Cadet Party but felt their aggressive opposition to the government served the aims of socialists. He was strongly opposed to both the populist Socialist Revolutionary Party and the Marxist Russian Social Democratic Labour Party, rejecting their materialism and terrorist activities. He became a great admirer of Prime Minister Pyotr Stolypin for his firm measures against terrorism and his radical agrarian reforms, which Denikin saw as the key to solving Russia's most urgent problem, peasant landownership. Before the First World War, he gained a reputation among his seniors as a "dangerous radical" for campaigning through the press to improve conditions for the private soldier.

== First World War ==
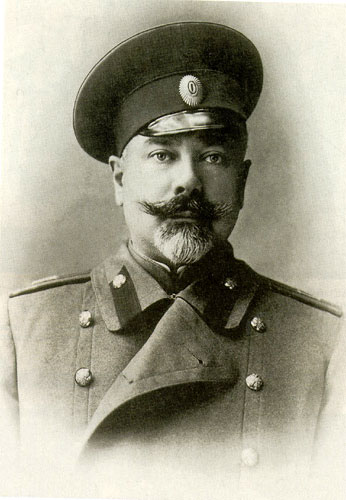
Denikin in 1914

At the outbreak of World War I in August 1914, Denikin was a major general on the staff of the Kiev military district. Dissatisfied with staff work, he requested a combat command and was appointed commander of the 4th Rifle Brigade, part of the 8th Army under General Aleksei Brusilov on the Southwestern Front. The brigade was known as the "Iron Brigade" for its valour in the Russo-Turkish War. Under Denikin's leadership, it became one of the most decorated units in the Russian army.

Denikin's first major action was during the Battle of Galicia in September 1914. He distinguished himself in the fighting near Gródek, where the 8th Army was nearly surrounded. In October, he led a daring surprise attack on the Austrian trenches at Gorny Lujek, capturing the headquarters of Archduke Joseph. For this exploit, he was awarded the Order of St. George, Fourth Class. He again showed initiative during the Battle of the Carpathians, leading his brigade across the mountains in severe winter conditions to invade Hungary and capture the town of Mezőlaborec. The exploit made a tremendous impression on the army, and Grand Duke Nicholas, the Supreme Commander, sent a congratulatory telegram praising the "valiant brigade".

In April 1915, the brigade was expanded into the 4th Rifle "Iron" Division. During the Great Retreat of 1915, the division fought a series of costly defensive battles amid severe shortages of ammunition. In September 1915, during the fighting near Łuck, Denikin's division launched a surprise counter-attack, capturing the city and taking nearly 10,000 prisoners. For this, Denikin was promoted to lieutenant general. In October, he captured Czartoryjsk in another daring action that involved flanking the enemy lines with military bands playing. He was awarded the Sword of St. George studded with diamonds for his role in the Łuck breakthrough of May 1916.

During the war, Denikin began a correspondence with Xenia Vasilievna Chizh, a young woman he had known since her childhood. They became engaged in April 1916. His mother, Elżbieta, became gravely ill at the beginning of 1916 and died in October of that year at the age of seventy-three. In September 1916, Denikin was appointed commander of the 8th Army Corps and dispatched to the Romanian front. He was deeply troubled by the political situation in Russia, noting the growing unpopularity of the government and the circulation of anti-government propaganda in the army.

== Russian Revolution ==
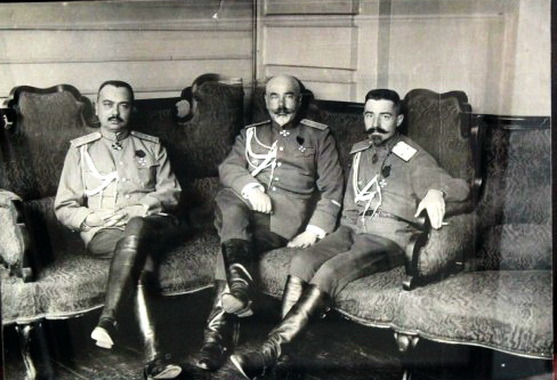
Denikin (center) with Generals Yakov Yuzefovich and Sergey Markov at the headquarters of Supreme Commander Mikhail Alekseev in Mogilev, May 1917

Denikin was at his Romanian headquarters when the February Revolution broke out in March 1917. He believed the collapse of the monarchy was inevitable and hoped for a constitutional monarchy, but feared that "the scum hiding behind the banners of the liberation movement" would lead to anarchy. Sixteen days after the Tsar's abdication, he was summoned to Petrograd and offered the post of Chief of Staff to the new Supreme Commander, General Mikhail Alekseev, by the Minister of War, Alexander Guchkov. The Provisional Government named Denikin to the post, intending to counterbalance Alekseev's perceived "lack of firmness" with Denikin's combat reputation and critical view of the old army bureaucracy. Denikin accepted the post and took up his duties at the Supreme Headquarters (Stavka) in Mogilev.

At Stavka, Denikin found himself at the centre of the army's political turmoil. He strongly opposed the "democratization" of the army promoted by the Petrograd Soviet, particularly through its Order No. 1, which he saw as destructive to military discipline. After Guchkov's resignation in May, the new Minister of War, Alexander Kerensky, continued the reforms. At a conference of officers at Stavka on 16 May, Denikin delivered a fiery speech denouncing the government's policies and warning that the officers had been betrayed. The speech made a tremendous impression and was circulated throughout the country, making Denikin a well-known figure among the officer corps.

Alekseev was dismissed and replaced by Brusilov. Unwilling to serve under Brusilov, whose opportunism he disdained, Denikin accepted the post of commander of the Western Front. The Kerensky offensive in July 1917 was a catastrophic failure, and the army began to completely disintegrate. At a conference at Stavka on 29 July, Denikin presented a devastating report on the state of his front, directly confronting Kerensky and accusing the government of destroying the army. His blunt speech led to an open breach with Kerensky. Shortly after, General Lavr Kornilov was appointed Supreme Commander. Denikin was appointed commander of the Southwestern Front. When Kornilov launched his move against the Provisional Government in late August (the Kornilov affair), Denikin supported him, issuing a telegram declaring his solidarity. His involvement was limited to this declaration of sympathy, as he was not an active participant in the conspiracy. For this, he was arrested on 29 August along with his chief of staff, General Sergey Markov, and other generals of his front. He was imprisoned first in Berdyczów, where he was nearly lynched by mutinous soldiers, and was later transferred to a prison in Bykhov with Kornilov and his supporters.

== Russian Civil War ==
=== Birth of the White movement ===
Following the October Revolution, the Bykhov prisoners decided to escape to the Don region, the traditional homeland of the Don Cossacks, where General Alekseev had begun to organize an anti-Bolshevik force. On 19 November, the acting Supreme Commander, General Nikolai Dukhonin, ordered their release just before he himself was brutally murdered by Bolshevik sailors. Denikin traveled in disguise, posing as a Polish nobleman, and after several weeks of evading Red Guard patrols, he reached Novocherkassk on 5 December.

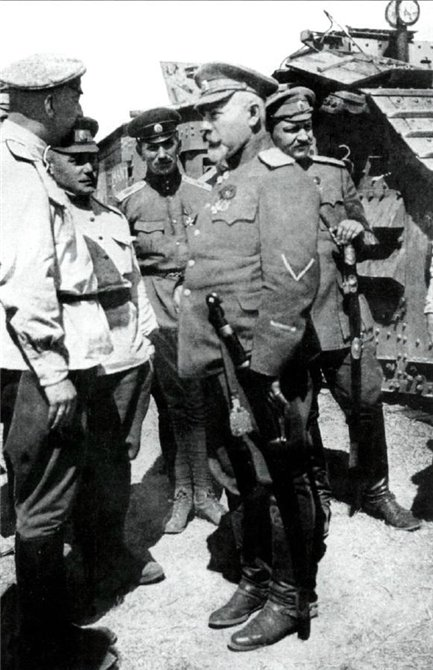
Denikin with a tank detachment under his command, 1919

Alekseev's organization, which consisted of a few hundred officers, was severely short of funds and faced the hostility of the local Cossack population, who feared being drawn into a civil war. The arrival of General Kornilov on 19 December, followed by Denikin and other generals, gave the nascent organization new life. On Christmas Day, 1917, the Volunteer Army was officially created, with Kornilov as its commander. Tensions arose between Alekseev and Kornilov over leadership. On 31 December, Denikin brokered a compromise which was accepted by the generals and became the "constitution" of the new army: Alekseev would be responsible for civilian and foreign affairs, Kornilov would take military command, and the Don Ataman, Aleksei Kaledin, would administer the Don territory, with a triumvirate of the three holding ultimate authority. Denikin was appointed commander of the 1st "Volunteer" Division. Amid the unrest in Novocherkassk, he married Xenia Chizh on 7 January 1918 in a small, private ceremony.

=== First Kuban Campaign ===
By late January 1918, facing pressure from the advancing Red Army and the collapse of Cossack resistance, the Volunteer Army was forced to abandon the Don. On 9 February, the army of about 4,000 men began its epic retreat, known as the Ice March, toward the Kuban, hoping to join with local Cossack forces. The campaign was a severe test of endurance. The Volunteers, burdened with their families and wounded, marched through freezing rain and snow, fighting continuous battles against superior Red forces.

On 13 April, during the storming of Ekaterinodar, the capital of the Kuban, General Kornilov was killed by a stray shell. Denikin, as deputy commander, assumed leadership of the army. He made the difficult decision to break off the assault and retreat, a move that saved the beleaguered army from destruction. After a series of rearguard actions, he led his forces back across the Don River and established a base in the southeastern Don region by early May. The First Kuban Campaign, despite achieving no immediate military objectives, preserved the core of the White movement. Its heroism and the sacrifices of its participants, the pervopokhodniki (First Campaigners), became legendary within the White movement.

=== Commander-in-Chief ===
In June 1918, Denikin launched the Second Kuban Campaign. The Volunteer Army, reinforced by Kuban Cossacks and a detachment under Colonel Mikhail Drozdovsky, defeated superior Red forces and captured Ekaterinodar in August. General Alekseev died of illness in September 1918, leaving Denikin as the sole commander. The government apparatus in the territories under Denikin's control, known as the Special Council, was established after the capture of Ekaterinodar but was beset by political challenges. The relationship with the pro-German Don Cossacks under Ataman Pyotr Krasnov was fraught with tension, as Denikin was staunchly pro-Ally. Furthermore, Denikin's uncompromising commitment to "a great, united, and indivisible Russia" became a major political liability, alienating potential allies like the Kuban Cossacks, who sought autonomy, and leading to disastrous conflicts with the newly independent states of Georgia and Ukraine.

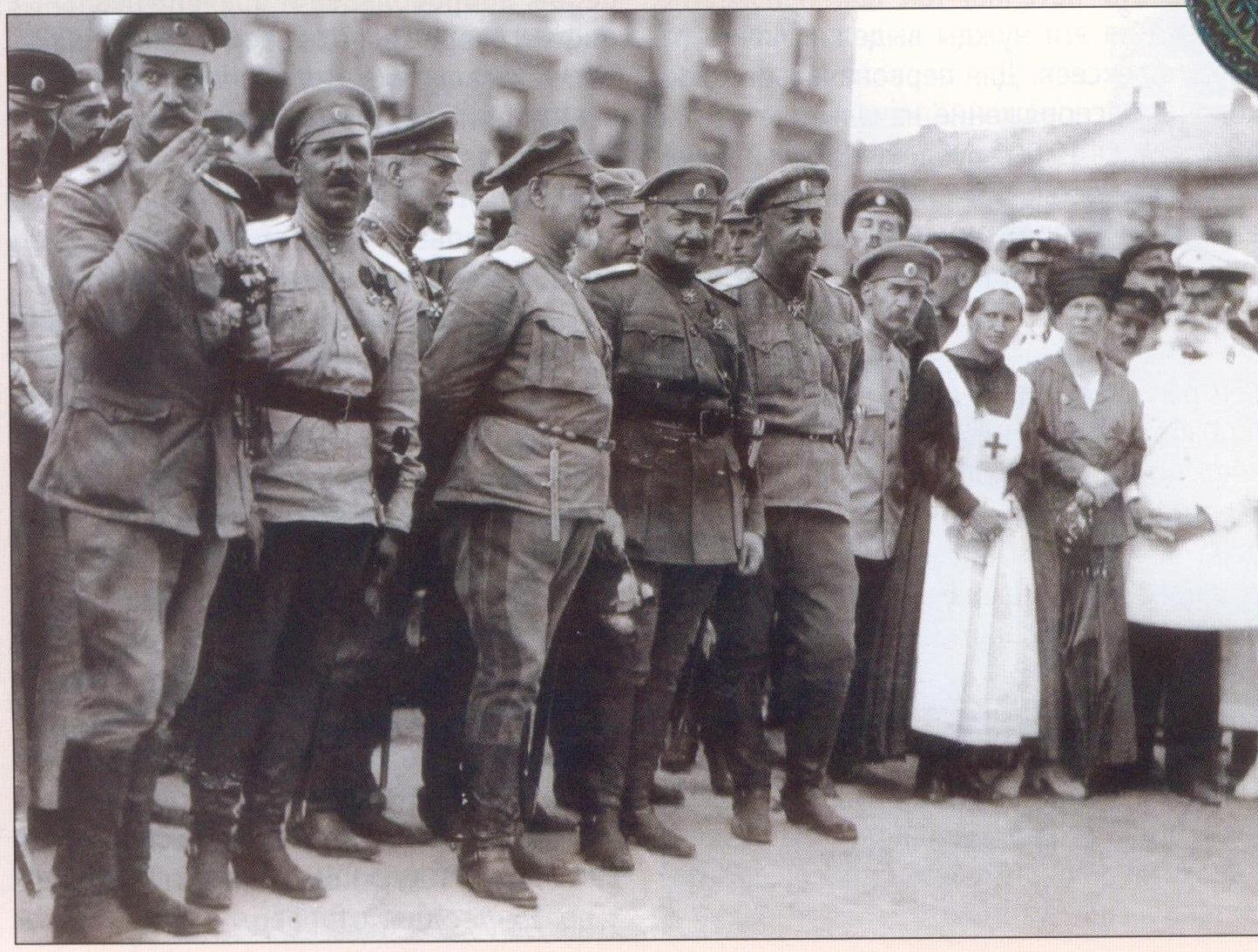
Denikin (front row, third from left) at a parade celebrating the capture of Kharkov by the Volunteer Army, June 1919

In January 1919, Denikin assumed the title of Commander-in-Chief of the Armed Forces of South Russia (AFSR). During the spring of 1919, his forces checked a major Red offensive in the Donbas region. In May, a series of counter-offensives routed the Red armies. The army grew rapidly; from May to October 1919, the number of soldiers increased from 64,000 to 150,000. On 20 June, Denikin issued the "Moscow Directive", ordering his armies to advance on a broad front with the ultimate objective of capturing Moscow. Initially, the offensive was a spectacular success. The Whites took the cities of Kharkov, Tsaritsyn, Kiev, Kursk, and, on 30 September, Voronezh and Orel. By October, Denikin's forces were within 350 kilometres (220 miles) of Moscow. However, his armies were overstretched, their supply lines were precarious, and their rear was plagued by peasant uprisings, particularly the anarchist movement of Nestor Makhno.

The advance into Ukraine was also accompanied by waves of brutal antisemitic pogroms, primarily carried out by Cossack units of the Volunteer Army. Denikin was not personally antisemitic and issued orders forbidding pogroms, but they were not enforced. His propaganda agency, Osvag, was transformed into a rabidly antisemitic organization which spread vicious propaganda and tolerated extremists in its ranks. The pogroms, which resulted in tens of thousands of deaths, devastated Jewish communities, undermined the discipline of the White Army, and discredited the movement internationally.

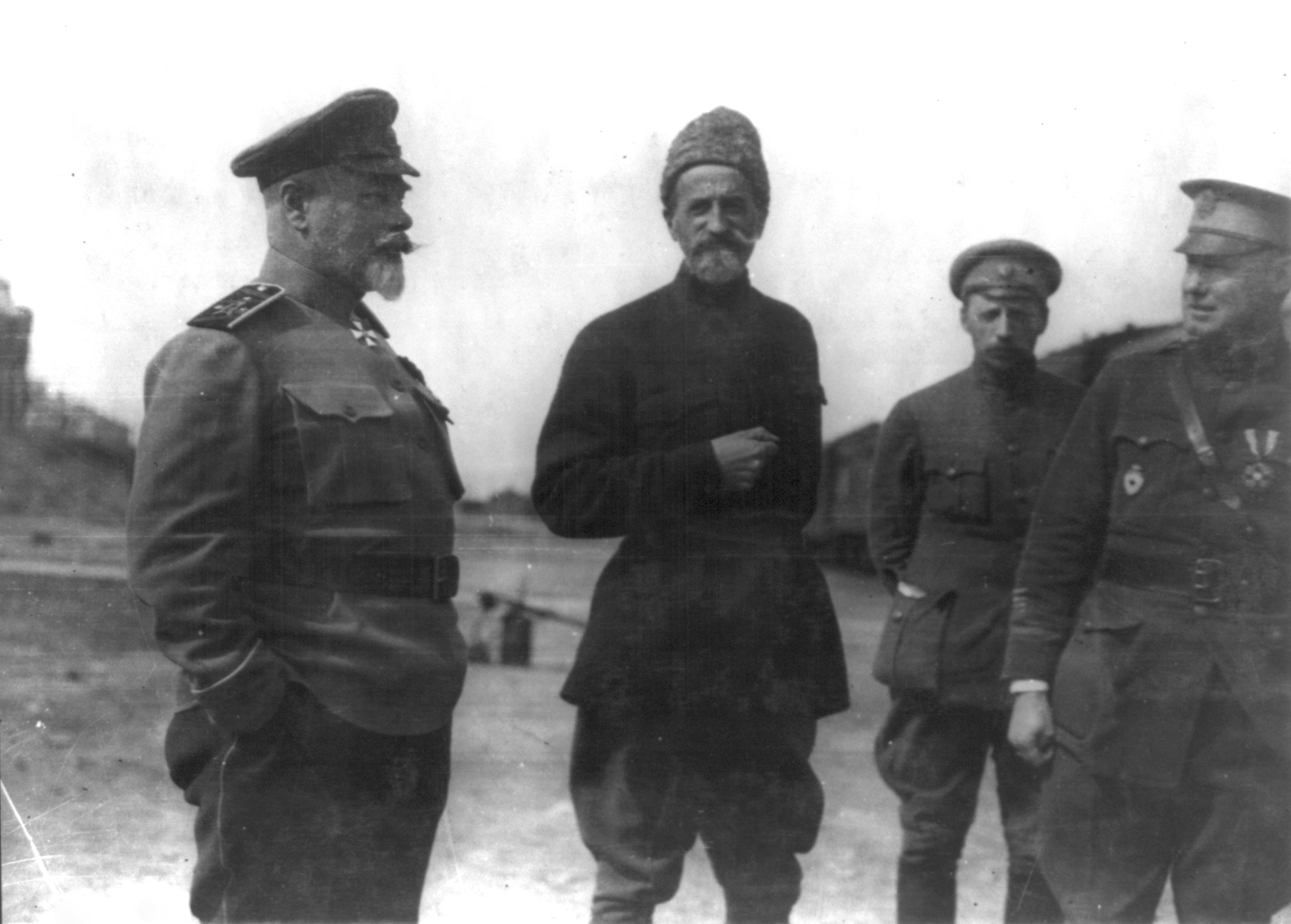
Denikin (left) with officers in 1920

In late October, a reinforced Red Army under the new command of Alexander Yegorov launched a counter-offensive. The Whites were decisively defeated in a series of battles at Orel and Voronezh. This marked the turning point of the war on the southern front. The White armies began a long and bloody retreat. The Special Council collapsed amid corruption and growing political infighting. The relationship between Denikin and General Pyotr Wrangel, commander of the Caucasian Army, deteriorated, with Wrangel openly challenging Denikin's leadership. By March 1920, the remnants of the White armies were cornered in Novorossiysk. The evacuation by sea, conducted under fire from the Reds and amid scenes of chaos, was a catastrophe. Thousands of soldiers and civilians were left behind. A plot by officers of the Kornilov Division to assassinate Denikin's chief of staff, Ivan Romanovsky, whom they blamed for the defeat, and depose Denikin himself, finally precipitated his decision to resign. On 4 April 1920, in the Crimea, Denikin resigned his command in favour of General Wrangel and left Russia aboard a British warship.

== Life in exile ==
Denikin's first stop in exile was Constantinople. A few days after his arrival, Romanovsky was assassinated in the Russian embassy building. Denikin and his family then proceeded to England. He was received with respect and met with Winston Churchill, who expressed admiration for his struggle. However, Denikin was dismayed by the British government's changing policy towards Soviet Russia and by a statement from Lord Curzon in The Times that falsely claimed Denikin had resigned at British urging. Offended, Denikin decided to leave England.

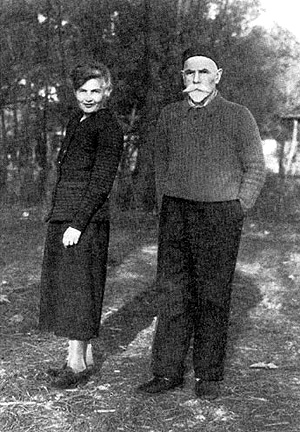
Denikin with his wife Xenia in France, 1930s

The Denikins lived in Belgium from August 1920 to May 1922, then moved to Hungary, where life was cheaper. During this period, he began writing his magnum opus, a five-volume history of the Civil War titled Ocherki Russkoi Smuty (The Russian Turmoil). The work, published between 1921 and 1926, remains a primary source for the history of the White movement. In 1926, the family settled in France. He became a central figure in the Russian émigré community but remained aloof from its political squabbles, concentrating on his writing and lectures. He kept in touch with former comrades-in-arms, including leaders of the Russian All-Military Union (ROVS), but he was deeply wary of its underground activities inside the Soviet Union, fearing they were infiltrated by the Soviet secret police (GPU). His fears proved well-founded with the GPU kidnappings of Generals Alexander Kutepov (1930) and Yevgeny Miller (1937), in which he was nearly embroiled himself.

As World War II approached, Denikin became a vocal opponent of any collaboration with Nazi Germany. He argued that foreign invasion would not liberate Russia but lead to its dismemberment and enslavement. When Germany invaded the Soviet Union in 1941, Denikin, then living under German occupation in the village of Mimizan in southern France, took a defiantly patriotic stance, urging émigrés to support the Red Army in defending their homeland. He refused all German attempts to co-opt him for anti-Soviet propaganda purposes. During the occupation, he and his wife secretly translated German radio broadcasts and official statements, circulating material that revealed Nazi plans to exploit Russian territory.

After the war, deeply concerned by the forced repatriation of Soviet prisoners of war to the USSR, Denikin decided to emigrate to the United States. He arrived in New York City in December 1945. He spent his final years writing and lecturing, continuing to advocate for a free and undivided Russia while warning against both Soviet communism and foreign intervention.

== Death and legacy ==
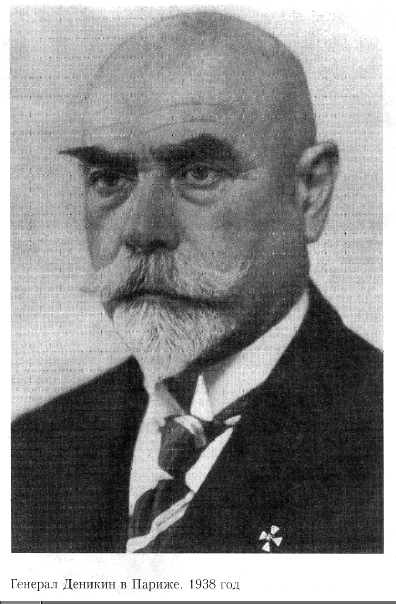
Denikin in Paris, 1938

Anton Denikin died of a heart attack on 7 August 1947, at the age of 74, while staying at a farm near Ann Arbor, Michigan. He was buried with military honours at Evergreen Cemetery in Detroit. His remains were later transferred to St. Vladimir's Cemetery in Jackson, New Jersey. In 2005, in accordance with his final wish to be buried in his homeland, the remains of Denikin and his wife were reinterred at the Donskoy Monastery in Moscow.

Denikin remains a controversial figure in Russian history. In the Soviet Union, he was portrayed as a reactionary monster and an enemy of the people. To his admirers in the Russian emigration and post-Soviet Russia, he was a great patriot and a selfless leader who fought to save his country from the tyranny of communism. As a military commander, he was capable and talented, leading his forces to the brink of victory in 1919. As a political leader, however, he failed. According to historian Peter Kenez, Denikin was a "decent man" but not an effective leader for a divided nation. He was naive and arrogant in his belief that the people would simply follow his lead, and he was unable to unite the competing anti-Bolshevik forces. His military background made him suspicious of politics, which he failed to grasp the importance of until it was too late. He failed to craft a political program that could unite the disparate elements of society behind the White cause, particularly the peasantry, who were alienated by his indecisive land policy, which included a provision to return a small portion of land to former owners. His uncompromising slogan of "a great, united, and indivisible Russia" alienated potential allies among the national minorities, who sought independence or autonomy. Despite his ultimate defeat and the errors of his command, he is remembered for his personal integrity, his courage, and his unwavering devotion to Russia.

== Honours ==
- Order of St. Stanislaus, 2nd degree with Swords (1904); 3rd degree (1902)
- Order of St. Anne, 2nd degree with Swords (1905); 3rd degree with swords and bows (1904)
- Order of St. Vladimir, 3rd degree (18 April 1914); 4th degree (6 December 1909)
- Order of St. George, 3rd degree (3 November 1915); 4th degree (24 April 1915)
- Golden Sword of St. George (10 November 1915)
- Golden Sword of St. George, decorated with diamonds, with the inscription "For the double release of Lutsk (22 September 1916)
- Order of Michael the Brave, 3rd degree, 1917 (Romania)
- Croix de Guerre, 1914-1918, 1917 (France)
- Sign of the 1st Kuban Ice Campaign, 1918
- Honorary Knight Commander of the Order of the Bath, 1919 (UK)
- Order of the White Eagle (Serbia)

== Denikin's works ==
Denikin wrote several books, including:

- The Russian Turmoil. Memoirs: Military, Social & Political. Hutchinson. London. 1922. (only volume 1 of 5 has been published in English.)
  - Republished: Hyperion Press. 1973. ISBN 978-0-88355-100-4
- The White Army. Translated by Catherine Zvegintsov. Jonathan Cape, 1930.
  - Republished: Hyperion Press. 1973. ISBN 978-0-88355-101-1.
  - Republished: Ian Faulkner Publishing. Cambridge. 1992. ISBN 978-1-85763-010-7.
- The Career of a Tsarist Officer: Memoirs, 1872-1916. Translated by Margaret Patoski. University of Minnesota Press. 1975.

== See also ==
- Symon Petliura
- Political positions of Anton Denikin
