= Béla Czafik =

Hungarian volleyball player (1937–2005)

Personal information
- Nationality: Hungarian
- Born: 23 September 1937; Mezőkomárom, Hungary
- Died: 17 November 2005 (aged 68); Budapest, Hungary

Sport
- Sport: Volleyball

Béla Czafik (23 September 1937 – 17 November 2005) was a Hungarian volleyball player. He competed in the men's tournament at the 1964 Summer Olympics.
