= Stove Top stuffing =

American brand of instant stuffing

Stove Top
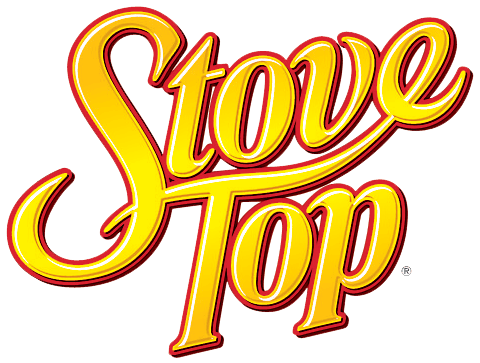

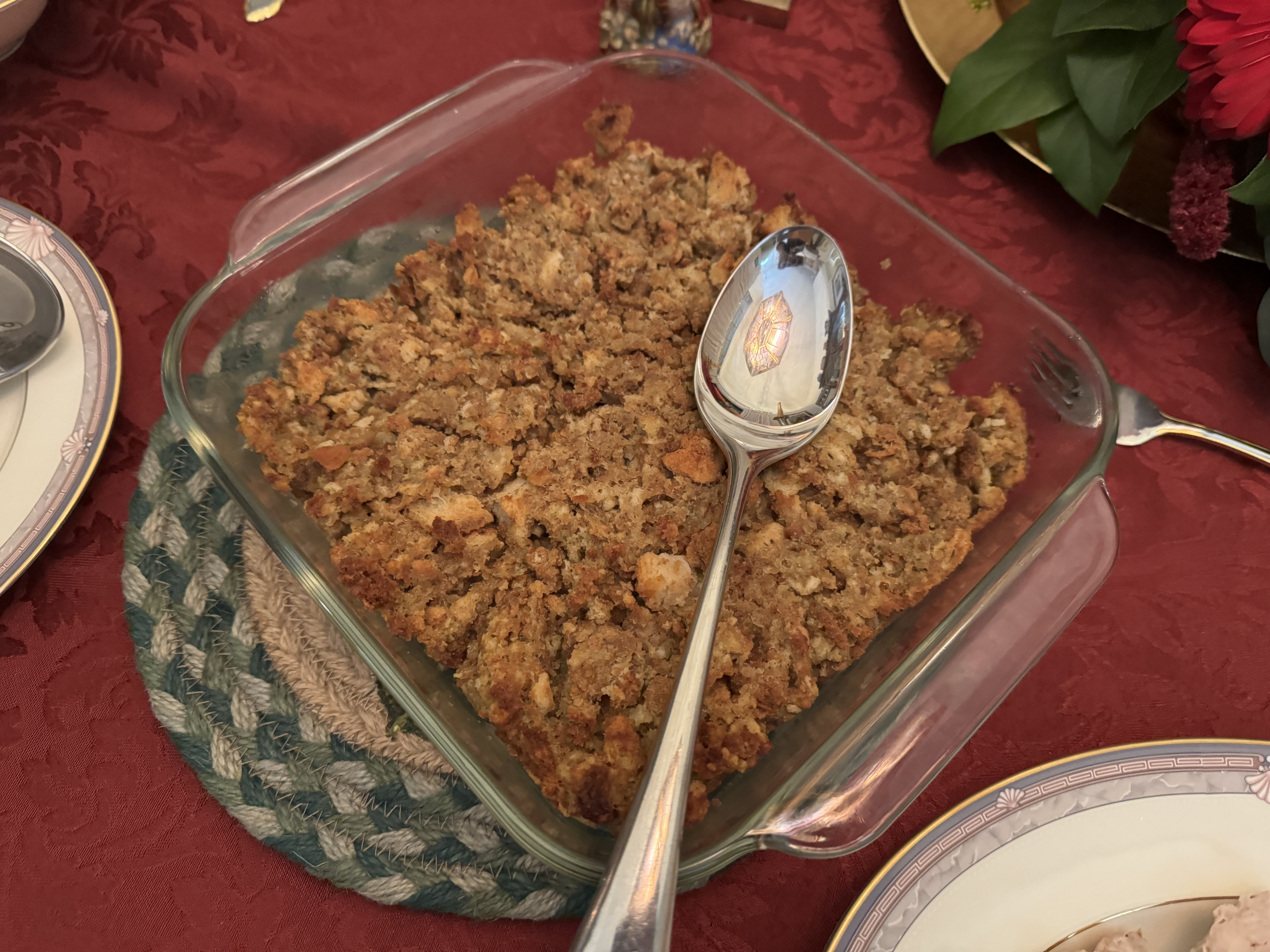
- Traditional Sage Stove Top stuffing at Thanksgiving
- Product type: Stuffing
- Current owner: Kraft Heinz
- Country: U.S.
- Introduced: 1972; 54 years ago
- Markets: Worldwide
- Previous owners: General Foods; Kraft Foods
- Tagline: "If it's not Stove Top, it's not Stuffing!"
- Website: kraftheinz.com/stove-top

Stove Top is a stuffing that was introduced by General Foods in 1972. It is a quick cooking ("instant") stuffing that is available in supermarkets. Unlike traditional stuffing, Stove Top can be prepared on the stove, in a pot, and can also be prepared in a microwave oven. It is used as a side dish for meals as well as a medium in which some meats (pork, chicken) can be baked. It is sold in boxes and canisters. In 2005 it was reported that Kraft Heinz, which has owned the brand since 1990, sells about 60 million boxes of Stove Top stuffing at Thanksgiving.

== Invention and patent ==
The Stove Top stuffing was first invented by Ruth Siems, whose name was part of U.S. Patent 3,870,803 for the product. The product originated with an idea from Jack Klinge of the marketing department for a stuffing flavored rice and, after that showed promise, Siems developed the bread crumb based dish we came to know as stove top stuffing.

== Flavors ==
There are a variety of flavors, including Chicken, Lower Sodium Chicken, Cornbread, Pork, Beef, Savory Herbs, Traditional Sage, Tomato & Onion, San Francisco Sourdough, Mushroom & Onion, Long Grain & Wild Rice and Roasted Garlic, Turkey, Apple and Cranberry.
