= Paul Langdon Ward =

American academic (1911–2005)

Paul Langdon Ward (February 4, 1911 – November 13, 2005) was an American academic, the fifth president of Sarah Lawrence College from 1960 to 1965.

== Life ==
Ward was born in 1911 in Diyarbakir in what was then the Ottoman Empire, the son of a medical missionary. He spent much of his childhood in Lebanon, where he attended the American Community School. He received his B.A. from Amherst College in 1933, an M.A. from Harvard University in 1934 and a Ph.D. in history from Harvard in 1940. He was an Assistant Professor History at Russell Sage College (Troy, NY) 1941–42 before joining the Office of Strategic Services (OSS) in the U.S. Department of State for the duration of World War II. After the war, Ward went to China as a missionary for the Protestant Episcopal Church, teaching at Huachung University in Wuhan from 1946 to 1950.

He returned to the U.S. to teach at Colby College (1951–53) and at the Carnegie Institute of Technology, later merged into what is now Carnegie Mellon University (1953–60). At Carnegie Tech, Ward became Chairman of the History Department. He was the fifth president of Sarah Lawrence College from 1960 to 1965. After Sarah Lawrence, Ward headed the American Historical Association (1965–74).

Ward served on Nelson Rockefeller's Commission on the Higher Education of Women, and was active in the peace movement in the U.S. in the Episcopal Peace Fellowship and on the Joint Commission of Peace of the Episcopal Church. In 1988, along with his wife Catharine, he received the John Nevin Sayre Award of the Episcopal Church for his work to promote peace. Ward also served on the board of directors for the Harry S Truman Library Institute, was a Fellow of the Society for Religion in Higher Education, and received honorary doctorates from Amherst College, Bard College and Clark University.

Ward was the author of William Lambarde's Collections on Chancery (1953), A Style of History for Beginners (1959), Confrontation and Learned Societies (with John Voss, 1970), Elements of Historical Thinking (1971), Studying History: An Introduction to Methods and Structure (1985), and “The Voice of Conscience: A Loud and Unusual Noise? The Episcopal Peace Fellowship, 1939-1989” (with Nathaniel W. Pierce, 1989).

In 1966 Ward led a committee to defend academic freedom after steel and coal heiress Helen Frick launched a libel suit in state court against Professor Sylvester Stevens. According to University of New Mexico law professor and historian Joshua Kastenberg who wrote on the topic, Stevens had written a history of Pennsylvania, and she claimed his book defamed her father. A number of professional historians under the auspices of the American Historical Association and the Organization of American Historians collected historical data on the robber barons of that time as well as that the early histories that lionized Henry Frick were ahistorical and inaccurate idolizing of him. The American Historical Association named Ward as the head of the Joint Committee to Defend History. Helen Frick's suit failed when Judge Clinton R. Widener, in 1967, determined that even if it were possible to defame a dead person, the historians had correctly captured Henry Frick's largess, maltreatment of workers, and political corruption.
