= Abdel Qader El-Touni =

Egyptian weightlifter

Personal information
- Nationality: Egyptian
- Born: 24 May 1924; Cairo, Egypt
- Died: 29 November 2005 (aged 81)

Sport
- Sport: Weightlifting

Abdel Qader El-Touni (24 May 1924 – 29 November 2005) was an Egyptian weightlifter. He competed at the 1952 Summer Olympics and the 1960 Summer Olympics.
