= Wilhelm Schulte =

German actor (1920–2005)

Wilhelm Schulte (January 28, 1920 – November 19, 2005), also known professionally as Willy Schulte and Willi Schulte, was a German actor and writer. He has 151 film credits to his name, including Königlich Bayerisches Amtsgericht (1969), Tatort (1970) and Lindenstraße (1985).

Schulte was born in Sendling borough, Munich and had his first acting role at the age of 10, providing voice acting for audio plays for Bayerischer Rundfunk. He had his first film credit in 1937, in the short film Der Katzensteg. By the 1950s, Schulte had made several minor appearances in Heimatfilm works, all locally produced in Bavarian audiences, before making regular appearances in national television by starring in Der Komödienstadel.

Although he did not achieve household fame, Schulte was a well-recognised Volksschauspieler for his many background roles, regularly typecasted as a grouchy councilman. He received the Order of Merit of the Federal Republic of Germany in 1993 and the Bavarian Order of Merit in 1995. He is buried in Munich Waldfriedhof.
