= Marina Denikina =

Russian-born French journalist (1919–2005)

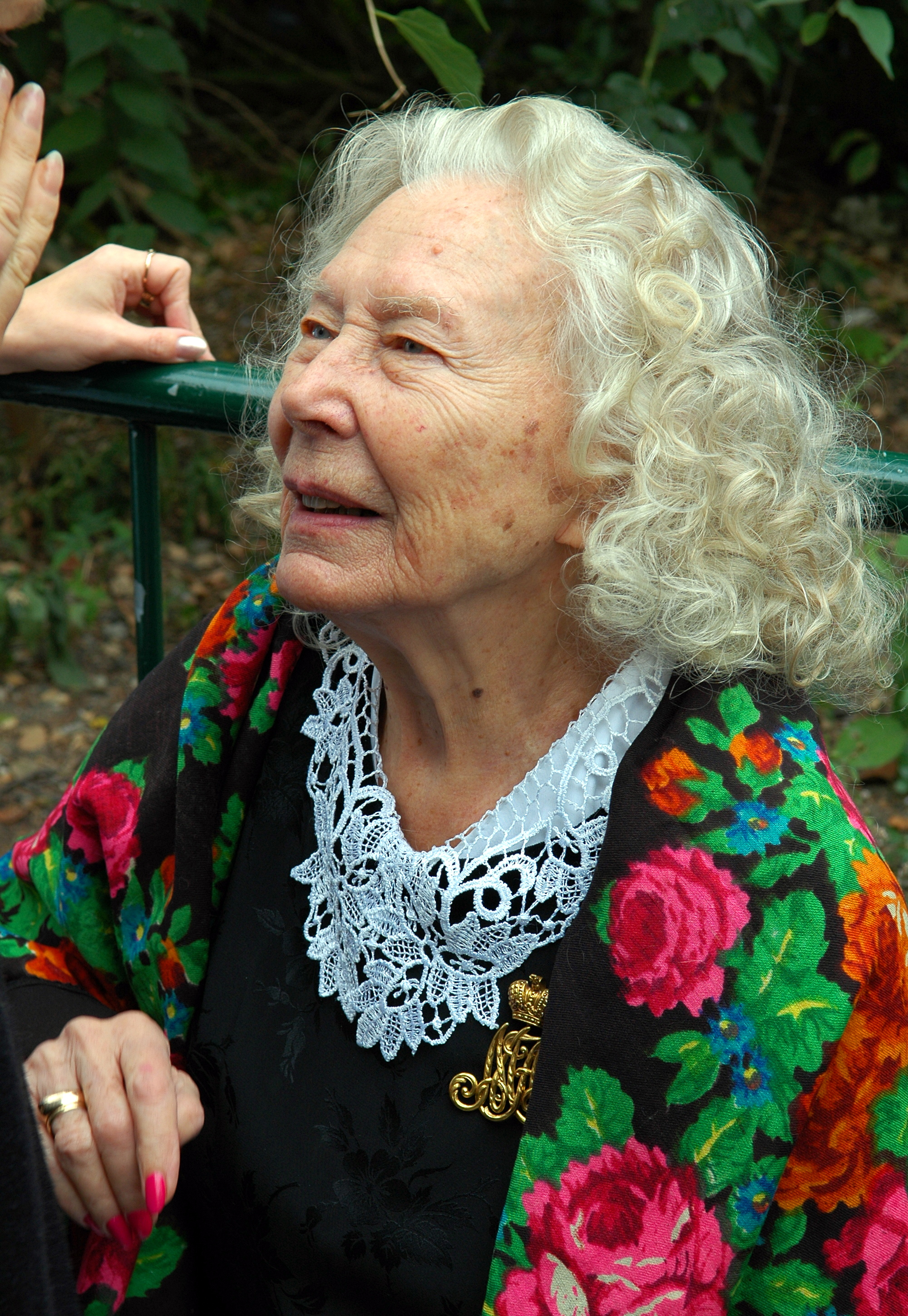
Denikina in 2005

Marina Antonovna Denikina (Russian: Марина Антоновна Деникина, pen name: Marina Grey) (20 February 1919 – 16 November 2005) was a Russian-born French writer and journalist.

== Biography ==
Denikina was born in Ekaterinodar (Russia). She was the daughter of Russian general Anton Denikin, leader of the counter-revolutionary White movement in the Russian Civil War, and Xenia Denikina. She left Russia in 1920 and lived in exile in France from 1926. She became a journalist and a producer at the French Radio and Television (working under the name of Marina Grey). She wrote several historical books about the Russian Civil War and her father, General Denikin.

In exile she married a French historian Jean-François Chiappe, getting the title of countess. She met Russian president Vladimir Putin on several occasions during his visit to France and eventually gave her consent to transfer her father's remains from United States to Russia. President Putin granted her Russian citizenship.

She last saw her homeland in October 2005, when the remains of General Denikin were repatriated and buried at the cemetery of Moscow’s Donskoy monastery. She died aged 86 at her home at Versailles on 17 November 2005.

== Publications ==
- My Father is General Denikin
- The General Dies at Midnight
- The Investigation of the Murder of the Romanovs.
