= Helen Muir =

British rheumatologist

Helen Muir CBE, FRS
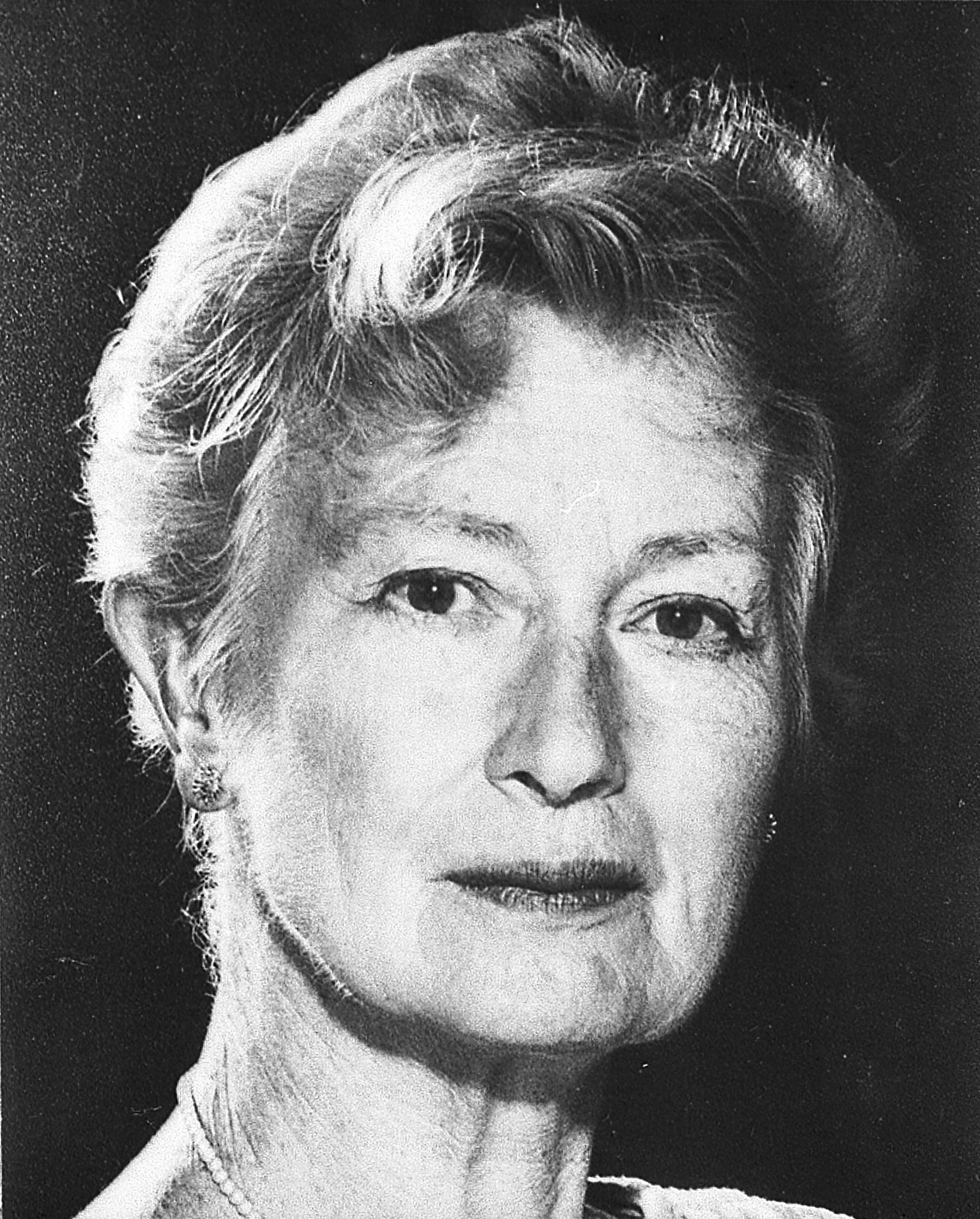
- Born: Isabella Helen Mary Muir; 20 August 1920; Nainital, India
- Died: 28 November 2005 (aged 85); Bedale, Yorkshire, UK
- Occupation: biochemist
- Honours: Fellow of the Royal Society; Commander of the Order of the British Empire

Isabella Helen Mary Muir CBE FRS (20 August 1920 – 28 November 2005) was a British biochemist. She did pioneering work on the causes of osteoarthritis.

== Personal life ==
=== Early life ===
Muir was born in India to G. B. F. (Basil) Muir and Gladys Helen Mary, and spent the first 10 years of her life there. Until moving to Europe in 1930, Muir had no formal education and was educated by her mother. At the age of 10, Muir began her general education at a boarding school in Montreux, Switzerland and at the Downe House in Berkshire, England. She began attending Somerville College in Oxford, England in 1940, with the original intentions of studying medicine. However, under the influence of her tutor, Dorothy Hodgkin, she switched her area of focus to chemistry. She graduated in 1944 with a second-class degree. She then went on to earn her Doctor of Philosophy in 1947 for a thesis on the chemical synthesis of penicillin – the supply of penicillin to stop wound infection was of high priority, as she did her research during World War II.

=== Adult life ===
Muir, a "fiery redhead", never married. The year after she earned her PhD, she worked as a research fellow at the Sir William Dunn School of Pathology at the University of Oxford. Albert Neuberger then recruited her into a new group in London in the biochemical division of the National Institute for Medical Research, and she moved to Mill Hill in 1949. Muir's interests shifted to biology under Neuberger, as he was studying the origin of haem biosynthesis. Muir published her first major papers with Neuberger in the Biochemical Journal in 1949 and 1950 on the biogenesis of porphyrins. This initial work led to Muir's interest in collagen and human connective tissues. She was awarded an Empire Rheumatism Fellowship with research space at St. Mary's Medical School in London. For most of Muir's career, she worked at the Kennedy Institute of Rheumatology in Hammersmith, the world's first specialist rheumatology institute. She was recruited to head a research division at The Kennedy Institute in 1966. During her time at the Institute, she published papers in the Biochemical Journal and Nature. She then went on to become the Institute's director in 1977, the same year she was one of only a few women made a Fellow of the Royal Society. Muir's group at the Kennedy Institute worked discovering the structure and functions of proteoglycans, proteins that make up a large part of cartilage. She is largely credited with discovering and exploring the varied causes of osteoarthritis and with illuminating the biochemical causes of the condition, which had previously been considered unworthy of study. Muir retired from the Kennedy Institute in 1990.

=== Later life and death ===
Muir retired to Yorkshire, where her interest in science and medicine continued. She added solar panelling to her house and worked to preserve the habitats of local wildlife. After battling breast cancer for several years, she died on 28 November 2005 in her home near Bedale, Yorkshire.
