= Ruth Siems =

American home economist (1931–2005)

- Born: February 20, 1931; Evansville, Indiana
- Died: November 13, 2005 (aged 74); Newburgh, Indiana

Ruth Miriam Siems (/siːms/; February 20, 1931 – November 13, 2005) was an American home economist who created Stove Top Stuffing.

== History ==
Siems was born in Evansville, Indiana in the early 1930s. During the early 1950s, Siems went to Purdue University. Leading up to 1985, Siems worked for General Foods. Their Stove Top stuffing was created by her during 1971.

Some sources say that Siems first sold the recipe to the Mrs. Cubbison's Foods corporation, and that later she further developed it for wholesale purposes in the General Foods Kitchen.

"Everyone always had me pegged as a creative person," she said in a newspaper interview. "I've always liked to put things together."

She died from a heart attack at her home in Newburgh, Indiana, on November 13, 2005, at the age of 74. In 2023 Holiday World announced that a new ride set to open in 2024, Good Gravy, pays homage to Siems.
