= Anja Secrève =

Dutch fencer (1917–2005)

Personal information
- Born: 8 October 1917 The Hague, Netherlands
- Died: 14 November 2005 (aged 88) Schaijk, Netherlands

Sport
- Sport: Fencing

Anja Secrève (8 October 1917 – 14 November 2005) was a Dutch fencer. She competed in the women's individual foil event at the 1948 Summer Olympics. She won Dutch championships in women's foil in 1946, 1948, 1949 and 1951.
