= Thomas DeLio =

American composer

Thomas DeLio (born January 7, 1951) is an American composer, music theorist and author. He is currently Professor of Music in theory and composition at the University of Maryland in College Park.

== Biography ==
DeLio received a bachelor of music degree from the New England Conservatory of Music, where he studied with Robert Cogan. He received a Ph.D. from Brown University in a Special Interdisciplinary Studies program that allowed him to combine advanced studies in music, visual arts, and mathematics.

DeLio's works are published by Editore Semar (Europe), Silent Editions (United States) and Sonic Art Editions (United States) and are recorded on such labels as Wergo, 3D Classics, Neuma, Centaur, Capstone, and Spectrum. He has published over thirty scholarly papers in such journals and periodicals as Perspectives of New Music, Journal of Music Theory, Indiana Theory Review, In Theory Only, Interface, Contemporary Music Review, Artforum, Computer Music Journal, Revue d'esthétique, and Percussive Notes.

DeLio has also written books, including one analyzing the work of Morton Feldman (The Music of Morton Feldman) and another offering analysis of several "open form" works (Circumscribing the Open Universe). His book "The Amores of John Cage" was published by Pendragon Press (as part of the College Music Society series Sourcebooks in American Music) in 2010. A book about DeLio's work entitled Thomas DeLio: Composer and Scholar edited by Dr. Thomas Licata (Professor, Hartwick College) appeared in summer of 2007 from the Mellen Press. This book contains essays by Wesley Fuller (Professor Emeritus, Clark University), Agostino Di Scipio (Professor, University of Naples, Italy), Christopher Shultis (Regents Professor, University of New Mexico), Hermann Sabbe (Professor of Musicology, Ghent University, Belgium), Morris Palter (University of California, San Diego), Steven Johnson (Professor, Brigham Young University), Robert Morris (Professor, Eastman School of Music), Tracy Wiggins (University of North Carolina at Pembroke), Linda Dusman, Thomas Goldstein (Professors, University of Maryland, Baltimore County) and Michael Boyd (Chatham University) .

== Influences ==
DeLio's approach to composition is largely influenced by Morton Feldman, John Cage, and Iannis Xenakis. The influence of Xenakis, however, is often more philosophical than musical. Describing the influence of Xenakis and Feldman, DeLio explains:

Xenakis and Feldman are influences in the general sense that they each tap into very personal and unique sensibilities; in this sense they should be role models for all composers. Also, for these composers, sound is the source of the compositional process. Sound, in all its richness and complexity, is the essence of that process for both – not system of method or gesture, as is the case for so many composers. This is true for me as well. First and foremost I think about sound when I start a piece.

The primary area where Xenakis and DeLio differ is in the use of mathematics, which is integral in Xenakis's compositions. DeLio states, "My music is not really mathematical at all!."

The influence of Cage is evident in DeLio's use of sounds outside of the standard dodecaphonic system. "Prior to the 20th century", DeLio notes, "the sonic materials of Western music were restricted to a set of twelve pitch classes. Over the course of the past hundred years, this restriction has virtually disappeared." Elsewhere, DeLio describes his attraction to percussion instruments, explaining, "Percussion allows a composer to deal with sounds drawn from the entire pitch/noise continuum. Thus, pitch is one manifestation of all sound ranging from pure tones to noise bands." Cage was a pioneer in this area, writing for a wide variety of percussion instruments, electronic devices, and even household objects to produce new sounds. Composers like DeLio are heavily indebted to his work.

Another area where the influences of Cage and Feldman are strongly felt is in DeLio's extensive use of silence as a compositional device. On the surface, in fact, DeLio's music bears a strong resemblance to the music of Cage and Feldman, both of whom made extensive use of sparse textures and were not afraid to use silence as a key part of their compositions. Upon further examination, however, one finds that the function of silence in music varies significantly among the three composers. Feldman, for example used silence to separate sounds and give them space to fade into silence. DeLio notes, "Feldman once said that one of the most beautiful things a sound does is decay. He could have added that in order for this decay to be felt, it must be attached to silence." Cage, on the other hand, used silence as a compositional tool for incorporating unintentional, atmospheric sounds into the context of a musical composition. DeLio explains, "Cage, of course, is the real source of all consideration of silence in music. But even his approach to silence is not like mine – though I deeply admire his work. For Cage silence is the space in which all unintended sounds come into play." DeLio's use of silence is different in that it is used to isolate sounds and events. He explains:

Silence is like a location for the experience of sound. For me it defines a place with respect to sound. My silence frames sound, isolates it, and creates an opportunity to hear sound both as an object – an entity unto itself divorced from its role as a mere unit of linguistic baggage – as well as part of a process of evolution. This is different from Cage or Feldman.

While this may sound similar to Feldman's use of silence, DeLio's approach is more radical, using large units of silence to not only isolate the events sonically, but also to isolate them mentally, leaving so much space that the memory will often forget one gesture before the next is presented, essentially forcing the listener to evaluate them as separate, unrelated musical entities. DeLio explains:

I always try to avoid constructing transitions linking individual events. I avoid anything which might convey a sense of continuity and connection. I desire everything to be segmented, halted, separated. I have no interest in memory, which seems to me an illusion. Only direct perception of the moment seems important to me.

== Compositional style ==
The most striking aspect of DeLio's music is his use of silence. His pieces include large sections of silence, sometimes a full minute. In fact, in many of his compositions the time devoted to silence is greater than the time devoted to sonic events. By isolating events and frustrating the memory, DeLio attempts to draw the listener into more intently listening to the brief sonic events. "I argue for wiping the slate clean", DeLio explains, "Rediscovering sound beneath all of the rhetoric and dated mannerisms which have accumulated over so many years and, in the process, really coming to grips with the nature of our own experience."

Another important aspect is his sense of time. In a majority of his pieces, he uses the same tempo, 60 beats per minute. Within this tempo, however, he uses a wide variety of subdivisions, including division of the beat into 5 or 7, and the pulse is rarely, if ever, clearly defined. 60 beats per minute is essentially the same as one beat per second, and DeLio thinks of time in his instrumental works as one would in tape composition: All events are measured against a temporal grid of minutes and seconds. DeLio's tempo is static, merely a reference for the performer. Instead of altering tempo, DeLio uses rhythmic devices to create effect within a constant pulse.

== Bibliography ==
Biographical citations

- The New Grove Dictionary of Music and Musicians (1999–2000 edition)
- Baker's Biographical Dictionary of Musicians, eighth edition

Complete and up to date information and citations regarding publications, recordings, compositions, reviews, etc. will be found on Thomas DeLio's website

Books (subject)

- Essays on the Music and Theoretical Writings of Thomas DeLio, Contemporary American Composer, Michael Boyd, ed. (Edwin Mellen Press, 2008) contains papers by leading composers and scholars from Europe and the United States including Herman Sabbe (Professor, Ghent State University, Belgium), Robert Morris (Professor, Eastman School of Music), Agostino di Scipio (Professor, University of Bari, Italy); Christopher Shultis (Regents Professor, University of New Mexico), Wesley Fuller (Professor Emeritus, Clark University), Morris Palter (Professor, University of Alaska), Linda Dusman (Professor, University of Maryland Baltimore County). ISBN 978-0-7734-5176-6

Books (author)

- Circumscribing the Open Universe (Lanham, Maryland: University Press of America, 1983).
- L'Universo Aperto, Italian translation of Circumscribing the Open Universe (Rome: Semar Editore, 2001)
- The Amores of John Cage, as part of the College Music Society series Sourcebooks in American Music, (Pendragon Press: 2010).
- Analytical Studies of the Music of Ashley, Cage, Carter, Dallapiccola, Feldman, Lucier, Reich, Satie, Schoenberg, Wolff, and Xenakis, Collected Essays Volume I (1980–2000), Patricia Burt, ed.; Edwin Mellen Press ISBN 9781495505928

Books (editor and contributor)

- The Music of Morton Feldman (London: Greenwood Press, 1996); contributions – Introduction; "Last Pieces"; Bibliography; Discography.
- Contiguous Lines; Issues and Ideas in the Music of the 60s and 70s (Lanham, Maryland: University Press of America, 1985); contributions – Introduction; "The Dialectics of Structure and Materials: Iannis Xenakis' Nomos Alpha"; "Sound, Gesture and Symbol".

Books (co-editor with Stuart Smith)

- Twentieth Century Music Scores (Englewood Cliffs, NJ: Prentice Hall, Inc.; 1989).
- Words and Spaces (Lanham, Maryland: University Press of America, 1989); contributions – Introduction; "Sound Installation: The Strathmore Hall Art Center".

Essays

- "A Web of Words: Elliott Carter's End of a Chapter" (College Music Symposium, vol. 56, 2016).
- "(ex)Congruities" (The Contemporary Music Review, vol. 34, nos. 5–6, 2016), pp. 478–492.
- "Introduction: Music/Text", (The Contemporary Music Review, vol. 34, nos. 5–6, 2016), pp. 367–372.
- "The Marvelous Illusion: Morton Feldman's The Viola in My Life (1)", (London: The Contemporary Music Review, vol. 23, no. 6, 2013), pp. 589–638.
- "Dis-moi, Daphénéo: Erik Satie's Path to Modernism", (College Music Symposium, vol. 51, 2011)
- "The Open Universe, Revisited", Thomas DeLio: Composer and Scholar (Edwin Mellen Press, 2007), pp. 223–230.
- Introduction, Mind Models (second edition), Roger Reynolds. (New York: Routledge, 2005), pp. vii–xiv.
- "The Sonic Landscape: Bewegt by Anton Webern", Thomas DeLio: Composer and Scholar (Edwin Mellen Press, 2006).
- "su una nota sola: Giacinto Scelsi's Quattro Pezzi, No. 3", Thomas DeLio: Composer and Scholar (Edwin Mellen Press, 2006).
- "Iannis Xenakis' Diamorphoses", Electroacoustic Music: Analytical Perspectives, Thomas Licata, ed. (New York: Greenwood Press, 2002), pp. 41–57.
- "Xenakis", Perspectives of New Music (vol. 39, no. 1; Winter 2001), pp. 231–243.
- "A Question of Order: Cage, Wolpe, and Pluralism", The New York Schools of Music and Visual Arts, Steven Johnson, ed. (London: Routledge, 2002), pp. 135–157.
- "On Christian Wolff" (English, French and German translations), Christian Wolff (Dordrecht, The Netherlands: Etcetera Recordings, KTC 1227, 2000).
- "Robert Ashley", Die Musik in Geschichte und Gegenwart, Ludwig Finscher, ed. (Kassel: Bärenreiter-Verlag, 1999).
- "Last Pieces, #3", The Music of Morton Feldman, Thomas DeLio, ed. (London: Greenwood Press, 1996), pp. 39–68.
- "Language and Form in an Early Atonal Composition: Schoenberg's Op. 19, No. 2", Indiana Theory Review (vol. 15, no. 2; Fall, 1994), pp. 17–20.
- "Time Transfigured: Erik Satie's Parade", The Contemporary Music Review (London: vol. 7, no. 2, 1993), pp. 141–162.
- "The Complexity of Experience", Perspectives of New Music (vol. 31, no. 1, 1993; pp. 64–77).
- "contrecoup...: Nonlinearity and Computer Aided Composition", Interface (Brussels: vol. 20, 1991), pp. 153–163.
- "An Exercise: Dismantling the Silence", Interface (Brussels: vol. 18, no. 3, 1989), pp. 195–217.
- "Sound Installation: The Strathmore Hall Art Center", Words and Spaces, Thomas DeLio and Stuart Smith, editors (Lanham, Maryland: University Press of America, 1989), pp. 197–207.
- "Structure and Strategy: Iannis Xenakis' Linaia-Agon", Interface (Brussels: vol. 16, no. 3, 1987), pp. 143–164.
- "A Proliferation of Canons II: Luigi Dallapiccola's Goethe Lieder, No. 6", Interface (Brussels: vol. 16, nos. 1–2, 1987), pp. 38–47.
- "A Proliferation of Canons: Luigi Dallapiccola's Goethe Lieder No. 2,” Perspectives of New Music (vol. 23, no. 2, 1985), pp. 186–195.
- "Spectra", Brass Bulletin (Bülle, Switzerland: no. 49, 1985), pp. 102–103.
- "Lecture: Return and Recall", Percussive Notes (research edition; vol. 22, no. 6, 1984), pp. 76–81.
- "Structure as Behavior: Christian Wolff's For l, 2 or 3 People", Percussive Notes (research edition; vol. 22, no. 6, 1984), pp. 46–53.
- _____________, Circumscribing the Open Universe (Lanham, Maryland: University Press of America, 1983), pp. 49–67.
- "The Shape of Sound: Alvin Lucier's Music for Pure Waves, Bass Drums and Acoustic Pendulums", Percussive Notes (research edition; vol. 21, no. 6, 1983), pp. 15–22.
- _____________, Circumscribing the Open Universe (Lanham, Maryland: University Press of America, 1983), pp. 89–105.
- _____________, MusikTexte (Cologne: 1986), pp. 36–39.
- "Toward an Art of Immanence: Morton Feldman's Durations III, #3", Interface (Brussels: vol. 12, no. 3, 1981), pp. 465–480.
- _____________, Circumscribing the Open Universe (Lanham, Maryland: University Press of America, 1983), pp. 29–47.
- "Circumscribing the Open Universe", Perspectives of New Music (vol. 20, nos. 1/2, 1981), pp. 357–362.
- _____________, Circumscribing the Open Universe (Lanham, Maryland.: University Press of America, 1983), pp. 1–7.
- "Sound, Gesture and Symbol", Interface (Brussels: vol. 10, no. 3–4, 1981), pp. 199–219.
- _____________, Contiguous Lines; Issues and Ideas in the Music of the 60s and 70s (Lanham, Maryland: University Press of America, 1985), pp. 111–141.
- "The Music of Alvin Lucier", Interface (Brussels: vol. 10, no. 2, 1981), pp. 137–146.
- "Structural Pluralism: Some Observations on the Nature of Open Structures in the Music and Visual Arts of the Twentieth Century", The Musical Quarterly (vol. 67, no. 2, 1981), pp. 527–543.
- _____________, Circumscribing the Open Universe (Lanham, Maryland: University Press of America, 1983), pp. 69–88.
- "Structure as Context", Sonus (Spring, 1981), pp. 14–27.
- _____________, (revised and expanded), Interface (Brussels: vol. 17, no. 2), pp. 65–77.
- _____________, Writings About John Cage, edited by Richard Kostelanetz (Ann Arbor: University of Michigan Press, 1993), pp. 163–175.
- "Philip Glass" and "Steve Reich", in No Title (Catalogue of the Sol LeWitt Collection), John Paoletti, ed., (Middletown, Connecticut: Wesleyan University, 1981), pp. 55–57, 85–87.
- "John Cage's Variations II: The Morphology of a Global Structure", Perspectives of New Music (vol. 19, nos. 1 and 2, 1980), pp. 351–371.
- _____________, Circumscribing the Open Universe (Lanham, Maryland: University Press of America, 1983), pp. 9–27.
- _____________, Revue d'Esthetique (Paris: nos. 13–14–15, 1987–88), pp. 169–176.
- "Spatial Design in Elliott Carter's Canon for 3", Indiana Theory Review (Fall 1980), pp. 1–12.
- _____________, Winds Quarterly (Fall 1980), pp. 9–15.
- "Iannis Xenakis' Nomos Alpha: The Dialectics of Structure and Materials", Journal of Music Theory (vol. 24, no. 1, 1980), pp. 63–95.
- _____________, Contiguous Lines; Issues and Ideas in the Music of the 60s and 70s (Lanham, Maryland: University Press of America, 1985), pp. 3–30.
- "Music Today: Issues of the Avant-Garde in the 70s" (published under the title: "Avant-Garde Issues in '70s Music"), Artforum (vol. 18, no. 1, 1979), pp. 61–67.
- _____________, Breaking the Sound Barrier, edited by Gregory Battcock, (New York: E. P. Dutton, 1981), pp. 254–271.

Reviews (author)

- "Roger Reynolds", Computer Music Journal (vol. 26, no. 2; Summer 2002), pp. 103–107.
- "Rasa", Computer Music Journal (vol. 19, no. 1, 1994), pp. 114–115.
- "Roger Reynolds", "Electro-Acoustic Music II", "The Contemporary Flute", Computer Music Journal (vol. 17, no. 3, 1993), pp. 70–73.
- "Electro-Acoustic Music: Classics" (Babbitt, Xenakis, et al.), Computer Music Journal (vol. 15, no. 2; 1991), pp 77–79.
- "James Dashow: Mnemonics, Oro, Argento & Legno, Archimedes", Computer Music Journal (vol. 14, no. 2; Summer 1990), pp. 71–72.

Articles (subject)

- "Against the Silence...", Christopher Shultis, Percussive Notes (vol. 27, no. 1, 1988), p. 64.
- "Toward a Morphology of Presence: The Sound Installations of Thomas DeLio", Michael Hamman, Interface (Brussels: vol.16, nos. 1–2, 1987), pp. 55–73.
- "A Draft of Shadows", Wesley York, Percussive Notes (research edition: vol. 22, no. 3, 1984), pp. 42–67.
- "Automated Composition in Retrospect", Charles Ames, Leonardo (vol. 20, no. 2, 1987), pp. 169–185; subject in part.

== Compositions ==
Smith = Smith Publications/Sonic Art Editions (Baltimore) Semar = Semar Editore (Rome)

1970

- Media Luna (soprano, 3 B♭ cl., vln. vla. vcl.), texts: Federico García Lorca; ca. 6'.

1971

- Sonata for piano (on one note); ca. 5'.
- The River Merchant's Wife (2 vln., vla., vcl.); ca. 5'.

1972

- A Draft of Shadows, texts – Octavio Paz (soprano, piano, 3 perc); ca. 9'.
- Cassandra (chorus SATB, vcl., perc.) text: Robinson Jeffers; ca. 13'.

1973

- Gestures (soprano sax., piano); ca. 8' Semar.
- Traces (fl., B♭ cl., alto sax., vln, vla, vcl., piano); ca. 9'.
- Marginal Developments (piano solo); ca. 9' Semar.

1974

- Serenade (piano solo); ca. 9' Semar.

1977

- I–VI (ob., B♭ cl., alto sax., B♭ tpt., 2 Bass cl., 2 bsn.); two sets; ca. 3' per set.
- 4 Series/I, II, III, IV (3 B♭ cl., 2 vln., 2 vcl.); ca. 3' per series.

1978

- (untitled) installation; Brown University, Providence, RI.

1979

- (untitled) installation; Brown University, Providence, Rhode Island.
- Four (8-79) (3 B♭ cl., soprano sax., alto sax., tenor sax., 4 vln., 2 vla.); three sets, ca. 3’, per set.

1980

- Five (6-80) (2 B♭ cl., B♭ Bass cl., soprano sax., alto sax., tenor sax., 6 vln); ca. 4'.
- Five (8-80) (10 vln., 4 vla., 4 vcl.); 5 sets, ca. 4' per set.

1981

- Six (1-81) (B♭ cl./B♭ bass cl., B♭ tpt., 6 vln.); two sets, ca. 4' per set.
- Six Variants I (2 fl., alto fl., 3 B♭ cl., 12 vln., 2 vla.); eight sets, ca. 3' per set.

1982

- Four Variants (4 vls., 4 vla., 4 vcl.); three sets, ca. 2' per set.
- Five Variants I (2 fl., alto fl., 3 B♭ cl., 6 vln.); three sets, ca. 3' per set.
- Six (4-82) (6 vln., 4 vla., 2 vcl.); three sets, ca. 4' per set.
- Four (9-82) (3 B♭ cl., 4 vln., 2 vla.); ca. 2'.

1983

- Sequence (piano solo); ca. 8' Smith.
- Text (piano solo); ca. 8' Smith.
- (untitled) installation; Corcoran Gallery, Washington, DC.
- (untitled) installation; Kornblatt Gallery, Washington, DC.
- (untitled) installation; UMBC Art Gallery, Baltimore, MD.
- Six (1-83) (3 B♭ cl., 4 vln., 2 vla.); ca. 4'.

1984

- 4 (6 vln.); ca. 2'.
- 3 (3 B♭ cl., 2 vln., 2 vla., 2 vcl.); ca. 1'.
- Six Variants II (2 fl., alto fl., 3 B♭ cl, 4 vln., 4 vla., 4 vcl.); six sets, ca. 3' per set.
- (untitled) installation; Baltimore Museum of Art, Baltimore, MD.
- (untitled) installation, proposal; Boston University, Boston, MA.
- (untitled) installation, proposal; University of Maryland Art Gallery, College Park, MD.

1985

- (untitled) installation; Strathmore Hall, Rockville, MD.
- Three (5-85) (2 vln., 2 vla., 2 vcl.); ca. 1'.
- Five (7-85) (B♭ cl., 6 vln.); ca. 2'.
- Five Variants II (2 fl., alto fl., 3 B♭ cl., 2 vln., 2 vla., 2 vcl.); three sets, ca. 3' per set.
- Five Variants III (6 vln., 6 vla. 6 vcl.); three sets, ca. 3' per set.

1986

- Against the silence... (perc. ensemble, piano, 4-channel tape); ca. 20' Smith.
- (untitled) installation, proposal; Washington Project for the Arts, Washington, DC.
- Four (5-86) (3 B♭ cl., 2 vln., 2 vla., 2 vcl.); ca. 3'.
- Four (6-86) (3 B♭ cl., soprano sax., alto sax., tenor sax., 2 vln., 2 vla., 2 vcl.); three sets, ca. 3' per set.
- Six (7-86) (B♭ cl., B♭ tpt., 2 vln., 2 vla., 2 vcl.); three sets, ca. 4' per set.
- Four (9-86) (3 B♭ cl., 2 vln., 2 vla., 2 vcl.); ca. 2'.
- Five (11-86) (3 B♭ cl., 4 vln., 2 vla.);ca. 3'
- Five (12-86) (3 B♭ cl., 2 vla.); ca. 2'.

1987

- Five (1-87) (3 B♭ cl., oboe, 2 vla.); ca. 2'.
- Five (2-87) (3 B♭ cl., 2 vla.); ca. 5'.
- contrecoup... (soprano, fl., piano, perc.), text: Stéphane Mallarmé; ca. 9½' Smith.
- Transparent Wave (snare drum solo); ca. 2’ Smith.
- Five (6-87) (fl., ob., 3 B♭ cl.); ca. 2'.
- Five (7-87) (fl., 3 B♭ cl., 2 vln.); ca. 2'.
- Four (8-87) (2 vln., 2 vla., 2 vcl.); ca. 2'.
- Five (8-87) (3 B♭ cl., 2 vln., 2 vla., 2 vcl.); ca. 3'.
- Five (11-87) (3 B♭ cl., 2 vln., 2 vla., 2 vcl.); ca. 3'.
- Five (12-87) (3 B♭ cl., B♭ tpt., 2 vln., 2 vla., 2 vcl.); ca. 3'.

1988

- Five (1-88) (3 B♭ cl., 2 vln., 2 vla., 2 vcl.); ca. 2'.
- Five (2-88) (3 B♭ cl., 4 vln.); ca. 3'.
- Five (3-88) (B♭ cl., 2 vln., 2 vla., 2 vcl.); ca. 2'.
- Five (5-88) (3 B♭ cl., 2 B♭ tpt., tbn.); ca. 4'.
- Six (5-88) (3 B♭ cl., 2 vln., 2 vla., 2 vcl.); ca. 4'.
- Five (6-88) (ob., 3 B♭ cl., 2 vln., 2 vla., 2 vcl.); ca. 3'.
- At Briggflatts meetinghouse (soprano, piano), text- Basil Bunting; ca. 7' Smith.

1989

- (6-89) (ob., 3 B♭ cl., B♭ tpt., 2 vla., 2 vcl.); ca. 2'.

1990

- Bright seaweed reaping (soprano, 3 B♭ cl., piano, 2 perc.), text: Cid Corman; ca. 4'.
- Two Songs (soprano, 3 B♭ cl., 2 perc., piano, harp), texts: Cid Corman; ca. 10' Smith.
- anti-paysage (fl., piano, perc., tape; ca. 10' Smith.
- granite, and (soprano, ob. 3 B♭ cl., piano, 2 perc.), texts: William Bronk, Basil Bunting, Cid Corman; ca. 14' Smith.

1991

- Of (tape); ca. 3' Smith.
- for (fl., ob., B♭ cl., vln., piano, perc.); ca. 2 ¾’.
- between (fl., 3 perc.); ca. 3' Smith.
- Than (orchestra: fl., ob., 2 B♭ cl., bsn., 2 C tpt., tenor tbn., bass tbn., 4 perc., harp, piano, 4 vln., 4 vla., 4 vcl., 4 cb.; ca. 4'.

1992

- Equinox (6 voices, 2 dancers, 4 perc.) text – William Bronk; ca. 4'.
- as again (tape); ca. 6' Smith.
- as so (tape); ca. 6'.
- so on (tape); ca. 2' Smith.
- not (piano, perc.); ca. 6' Smith.

1993

- Though (piano solo); ca. 5' Smith.
- Five (1-93) (fl., ob., 3 B♭ cl., 2 vln., 2 vla., 2 vcl.); ca. 3'.
- Transparent Wave II (piano solo); ca. 1'.

1994

- so again (tape); ca. 2' Smith.
- on again (tape); ca. 3' Smith.
- of again (tape); ca. 4' Smith.
- Pine, Bamboo, Plum (tape); ca. 2'.
- as though (percussion solo); ca. 2' Smith.

1995

- because the... (tape); ca. 2'.
- as though, again (fl., B♭ cl., vln., perc., (one player)); ca. 2' Smith.
- as though, so again (fl., B♭ cl., C tpt., vln., vcl., piano, perc.); ca. 2' Smith.
- as though / after (chamber orchestra: fl., ob., B♭ cl., bsn., perc., vln. I (6), vln. II (6), vla. (4), vcl. (4), cb. (2); ca. 5' Smith.

1996

- to make / -as / in- (tape) text – Leslie Scalapino; ca. 5'.
- que cela se puisse (speaker, fl., B♭ cl., vln., cb., piano) text: Stéphane Mallarmé; ca. 1'.
- or (ob., 2 B♭ cl., C tpt., vln., vcl., 1 perc.); ca. 2'.

1997

- think on parch (tape) text – P. Inman; ca. 19'.
- though, on (tape); ca.2'.
- plin, h (tape); ca. 1¾'.
- plin, x (tape); ca . 1'.
- m, nce (tape); ca. 2'.
- as in (string orchestra); ca 2 ½’.

1998

- n, mcr (tape); ca. 1'.
- nna, c (tape); ca. 1'.
- decker (tape) text – P. Inman; ca. 9'.
- n, c (tape); ca. 1'.

1999

- x, e (tape); ca. 2'.
- inc, e (tape); ca. 1'.
- Transparent Wave III (soprano solo) text: A. R. Ammons; ca. 2'.
- Center (version I, soprano solo); ca. 8’; (version II, soprano and chamber ensemble), texts: A. R. Ammons; ca. 14'.
- as though / of (tape); ca. 5'.

2000

- qu, m (tape); ca. 2'.
- qu, r (tape); ca. 2'.
- z, rb (tape); ca. 2'.
- Center / s (tape); ca. 4'.
- Transparent Wave IV (marimba solo); ca. 2' Smith.
- Transparent Wave V (cello solo); ca. 4'.

2001

- et ainsi (soprano, fl., ob., B♭ cl., C tpt., tenor tbn., vln., vcl., piano, 2 perc.), texts – Stéphane Mallarmé; ca. 9'.
- ce, lf (tape); ca. 1'.
- cel, f, (tape); ca. 1'.
- , c, el, f (tape); ca. 1'.

2002

- amounts. to. opera/installation for tape (six tracks), text – P. Inman; plays continuously over several days.
- so, between (fl., B♭ cl., vcl., piano, perc.); ca. 2'.

2003

- Belle-Isle I–IV (tape); ca. 7'.
- wave / s (percussion solo), based on Transparent Wave IV; ca. 4'.
- Transparent Wave VI (vibraphone solo); ca. 2'.

2004

- e/ede (3 B♭ cl., ob., bsn., C tpt., piano, vln., vla., vcl.); ca. 3'.
- e, nm (fl., cl., vln., vcl., perc.); ca. 2'.
- Iol (piccolo, B♭ cl. Eng. Hn., B♭ tpt., 2 vln., 2 vla.); ca. 2'.
- Ilil (4 vln., 4 vcl.,); ca. 2'.
- alomn (B♭ cl., 2 vln., 2 vla.); ca. 2'.
- Zilahn (tape); ca. 3'.

2005

- IV–VIII (B♭ clarinet and string quartet); 2 ½’.
- qu'un espace / sépare (percussion ensemble, soprano); ca. 5 ½’.
- mn, s (fl., cello); 1 ¾’.
- Song: Foxrock near Dublin (tape, 5.1 surround), text – P. Inman; ca. 8’.

2006

- onnh I (fl., B♭ cl. doubling bass cl., vln., cello, piano, perc.); ca. 2’.
- onnh II (fl., ob., B♭ cl. doubling bass cl., vln., vla., cello, piano, perc.); ca. 2’.
- transients / waves (percussion solo), based on Transparent Wave VI; ca. 4’.
- transients / images (percussion, piano), based on Transparent Wave VI; ca. 5 ½’.
- transients / resonances (flute, B♭ clarinet, violin, cello, percussion, piano), based on Transparent Wave VI; ca. 5 ½’.

2007

- Transparent Wave VII (saxophone solo); ca. 1 ¾’.
- Transparent Wave VIII (percussion solo); ca. 1 ¼’.
- ...zwischen den Worten (tape), texts – Paul Celan; ca. 8 ½’.
- - en / l'espace de... (XXVI–XXX) (soprano and chamber orchestra); ca. 2 ¼’.
- XXIII–XXVII (tape); ca. 3’17”.

2008

- ylm, n (XX–XXV) (ob., 3 Bb cl./1 doubling bass cl., soprano sax., alto sax., vln., vla.); ca. 3’.
- cs, s (XIV–XVII) (ob., Bb cl., vln., vla.); ca. 1 ¾’.
- sc, s (X–XIII) (ob., Bb. Cl., soprano sax., vln., vla.); ca. 1 ¾’.
- lymn (XXX- XXXIV) (fl., ob., Bb cl., bsn., 2 vin., vla., vcl.); ca. 1 ½’.
- XXXII–XXXVI (fl., ob., Bb cl., bsn., 2 vln., vla., vcl.); ca. 1 ½’.
- Sakuteiki (XXII–XXIV) (tape); ca. 6’

2009

- Five Pieces for Piano (piano solo): ca. 4’.
- for string orchestra (10 vln., vla., vcl.): ca. 1 ¾’.
- folium (Bb cl., ob., soprano sax., 10 vln., vla., vcl.); ca. 5’.
- that light (soprano solo); ca. 6’.
- Five Pieces for Clarinet and Percussion (Bbcl., perc. (1 player)); ca 4’.

2010

- "sam", opera/installation for tape (4 channels) and video (3 screens), text by P. Inman; plays continuously over several days.
- "sam", version for single widescreen hdtv, stereo; ca. 17'.
- jeu de timbres (percussion solo); ca. 6'.
- transients / interferences (fl. doubling picc. and bass fl., gtr., vln., perc. 1 player); ca. 5'.

2011

- Quatre Petites Mélodies (1920), Erik Satie (orchestrated by Thomas DeLio); 3'.
- transients / refractions (orchestra); 5 1/2'.
- et avant / image (fl., 9 perc.); ca. 7'.
- et avant / image / aussi (fl., ob., Bb cl., alto sax., C tpt., tenor tbne., 9 perc.); ca. 7'.
- et avant / image/ l'autre (fl., ob., Bb cl., alto sax., C tpt., tenor tbne., 4 vln., 4 vla., 4 vcl., 9 perc.); ca. 7'.

2012

- ...that light... (sop., fl., Bb cl., C tpt., vln., vcl, perc. (1 player).); ca. 6’
- ...á l'autre, ainsi (piano, chamber orchestra); ca. 6 ¾’

2013

- sound / shivering /silence (percussion solo); ca. 9’.
- anti-paysage II (tape); ca. 7 ¾’.
- aengus, opera/installation for tape (6 channels), text by P. Inman; plays continuously over several days. Also versions in surround sound and stereo (ca. 31 ½’ each).
- Song: "aengus" (tape), text P. Inman; ca. 5 ¼’.

2014

- sound / shivering / silence II (percussion quartet); ca. 12’.
- après Belle-Isle (tape); ca. 2’.
- Hörreste (Soundscrapes) (tape); ca. 4 ½’.
- In Prag (In Prague) (tape); ca. 6 ¾’.
- Sakuteiki (surround version) (tape); ca. 6’.
- Schaufäden (Sight Threads) (tape); ca. 3’.
- Sichtbar (Visible) (tape); ca. 5’.
- Vorflut (Outfall) (tape); ca. 1 ½’.
- Weissgrau (Whitegray) (tape); ca. 4 ½’.

2015

- inents (seven electroacoustic compositions); various durations.
- sound / shivering / silence III (percussion sextet); ca. 14'
- Three Songs (soprano, orchestra); ca 6'

2016

- Spüren (Traces) ca. 3.5'
- et absence (violin, percussion sextet); ca. 7'
- Trois Visage – three compositions for soloist and percussion ensemble; ca. 20' (flute and nine percussionists; violin and six percussionists; soprano and six percussionists).

== Recordings ==
- space / image / word / sound II', a DVD of computer music in 5.0 surround sound including five versions of the composition inents, Hörreste (Soundscrapes), In Prag (In Prague), Schaufäden (Sight Threads), Sichtbar (Visible), Vorflut (Outfall), Weissgrau (Whitegray), and Sakuteiki (Neuma 450–202).
- Thomas DeLio: Selected Compositions II 1972–2015, including inents (two versions), computer music; anti-paysage, flute, piano, percussion; anti-paysage II, computer music; – en / l'espace de..., soprano and orchestra; x, e, inc, e, m, nce, and n, c, computer music; Text and Serenade, piano solos; not, piano, percussion; and, A Draft of Shadows, soprano and percussion ensemble (Neuma 450–116).
- space / image / word / sound, a DVD of eight of compositions in 5.0 surround sound including Song: Foxrock near Dublin, computer music; et avant / image, flute, percussion ensemble; ...zwischen den Worten, computer music; qu'un espace / sépare, soprano, percussion ensemble; amounts. to., computer music; sam, computer music and video; aengus, computer music (Neuma 450–201).
- Thomas DeLio: Selected Compositions 1991–2013, including Belle-Isle I–IV, computer music; transients / images, percussion, piano; ...transients, computer music; Though, piano solo; XXXIII – XXVII, computer music; as though, percussion solo; as though / of, computer music; between, flute, piano, 3 percussionists; z, rb, computer music; Center, solo voice; Center / s, computer music; Than, orchestra;, c, el, f, computer music; that light, solo soprano; Song: "aengus", computer music; Zilahn, computer music (Neuma 450–108).
- Selected Compositions of Thomas DeLio, a CD accompanying the book Essays on the Music and Theoretical Writings of Thomas DeLio, Contemporary American Composer, The Edwin Mellen Press (2008): ce, lf, computer music; between, flute and percussion ensemble; Pine, Bamboo, Plum, computer music; Though, piano solo; "because the...", computer music; as though, percussion solo; z, rb, computer music; as though, again, chamber ensemble; Zilahn, computer music; think on parch, computer music; Belle-Isle, computer music; ...zwischen den Worten, computer music; XXIII–XXVII (2007), computer music.
- "en l'espace de...", soprano and orchestra (ERMMedia, ERM-5999); part of the Masterworks of the New Era series.
- "...zwischen den Worten", two songs on texts by Paul Celan (computer music, 5.1 surround sound); released on DVD in 5.1 surround sound (Capstone, CPS-8811).
- Song: Foxrock near Dublin, song on text by P. Inman (computer music, 5.1 surround sound); released on DVD in 5.1 surround sound (Capstone, CPS-8811).
- Center/s, tape (Acton, MA: Neuma, 450–105, 2006).
- Belle-Isle I–IV, tape (Acton, MA: Neuma, 450–105, 2006).
- qu, m, tape (Acton, MA: Neuma, 450–105, 2006).
- wave / s, percussion solo (Baton Rouge, LA: Centaur, CRC-2742, 2006).
- Though, piano solo (New York: Capstone, CPS-8745, 2005).
- Transparent Wave V, piano solo (New York: Capstone, CPS-8745, 2005).
- Text, piano solo (New York: Capstone, CPS-8745, 2005).
- Than, orchestra (Mt. Prospect, Illinois: ERMMedia, ERM-6692, 2003);

part of the Masterworks of the New Era series.

- amounts. to. electronic opera (Baton Rouge, LA: Centaur, CRC-2633, 2003).
- Center, soprano and chamber ensemble (Acton, MA: Neuma, 450–102, 2002).
- think on parch, tape (New York: Capstone, CPS-8693, 2001).
- decker, tape (New York: Capstone, CPS-8669, 1999).
- plinh, h, tape (Acton, MA: Neuma, 450–499, 1999).
- m, nce, tape (Acton, MA: Neuma,450-99, 1999).
- though, on, tape (New York: Capstone, CPS 8645, 1997).
- as though, percussion solo (New York: Capstone, CPS 8645, 1997).
- so again, tape (New York: Capstone, CPS 8645, 1997).
- not, piano and percussion (New York: Capstone, CPS 8645, 1997).
- ...a different liquid, tape (New York: Capstone, CPS 8645, 1997).
- to make / -as / in-, tape (New York: Capstone, CPS 8645, 1997).
- "because the..., tape (Acton, MA: Neuma, 450-492, 1996).
- Pine, Bamboo, Plum, tape (Acton, MA: Neuma, 450-492, 1996).
- so on, computer generated tape (Paris: 3D, 3D-8014, 1996).
- as again, computer generated tape (Paris: 3D, 3D-8014, 1996).
- between, flute, percussion ensemble (Paris: 3D, 3D-8014, 1996).
- anti-paysage, flute, piano, percussion, tape (Acton, MA: Neuma 450-90, 1995).
- Of, tape (Acton, MA: Neuma 450-90, 1995).
- Though, piano (Acton, MA: Neuma 450-90, 1995).
- so again, tape (Acton, MA: Neuma 450-90, 1995).
- on again, tape (Acton, MA: Neuma 450-90, 1995).
- of again, tape (Acton, MA: Neuma 450-90, 1995).
- contrecoup..., chamber ensemble (Acton, MA: Neuma 450-81, 1993).
- Against the silence..., percussion ensemble and four-channel tape, (Mainz: Wergo, WER 2029-2, 1992); part of the ComputerMusic Currents series.
- ______________ (Paris: 3D Classics, 3D-8014, 1996).
- Partial Manifolds, wind ensemble (Harriman, NY: Spectrum, SR-302, 1985).
- Gestures, saxophone and piano (Harriman, NY: Spectrum, SR-163, 1982).
- Marginal Developments, piano solo (Harriman, NY: Spectrum, SR-144, 1982).
- Serenade, piano solo (Harriman, NY, Spectrum, SR-128, 1980).
