= Oof =

Oof or OOF may refer to:

== Acronyms ==
- Out of focus; see List of abbreviations in photography
- Other Official Flows, a categorization of foreign aid used by official development assistance
- Out of facility; see List of business and finance abbreviations

== Music ==
- Oof (album), a 1989 album by the Happy Flowers
- Oof! (EP), a 2009 EP by Blue Scholars
- "Oof", a 2002 song by Özlem Tekin
- Oof! Records, a label of North Sea Radio Orchestra
- Oof Oof, a 2005 album by Nelly Makdessy

== Other uses ==
- Oof (magazine and gallery), a magazine and gallery for football-related art
- Roblox oof, a sound effect from the video game platform Roblox
- OOF: Finite Element Analysis of Microstructures, a software package developed by R. Edwin Garcia
