= Catherine Bishop (scientist) =

New Zealand materials scientist

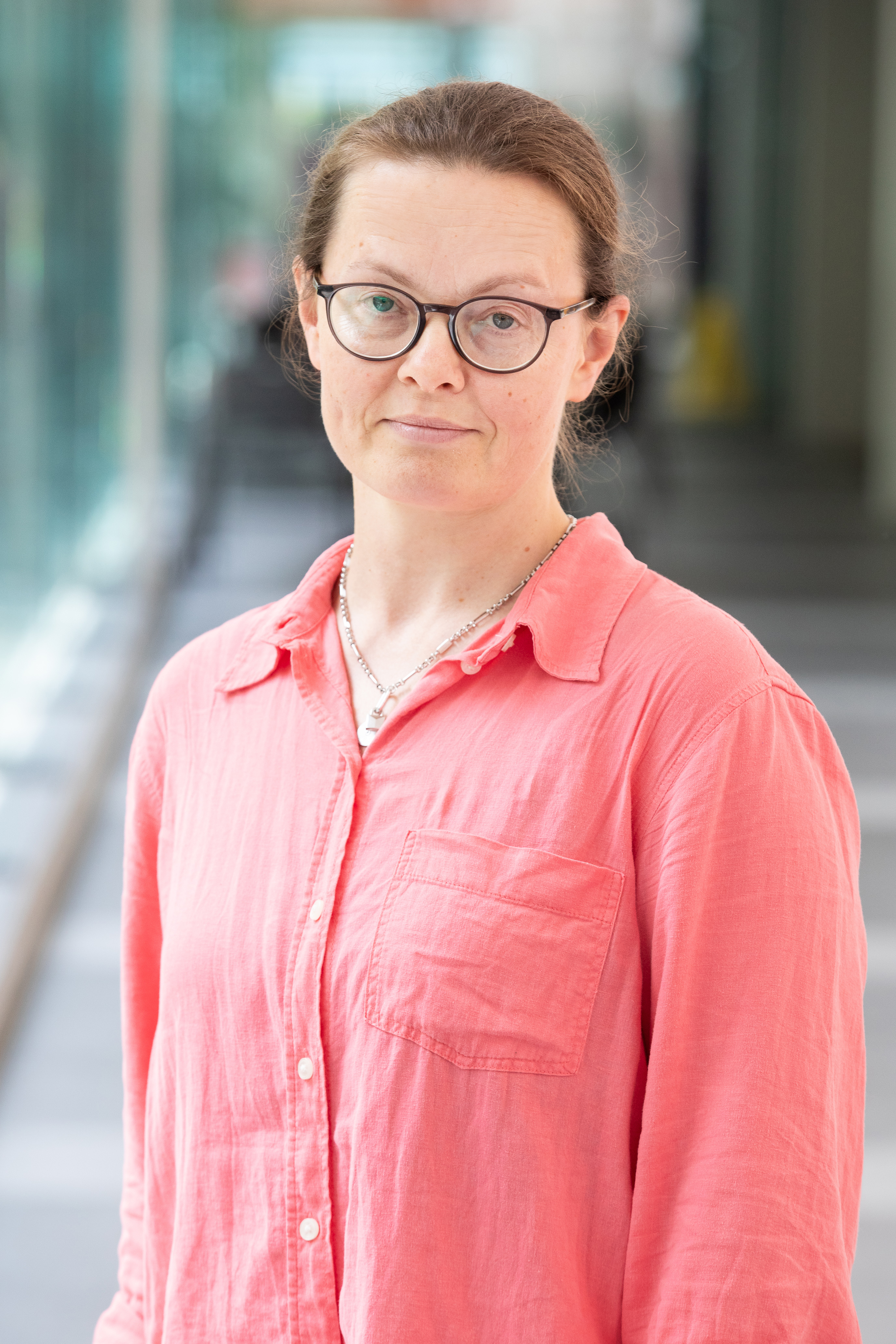
- Education: Massachusetts Institute of Technology, Carnegie Mellon University
- Scientific career
- Fields: Materials science
- Workplaces: University of Canterbury
- Thesis: Continuum models for intergranular films in silicon nitride and comparison to atomistic simulations (2003)
- Doctoral advisor: W. Craig Carter
- Website: University of Canterbury profile

Catherine Mary Bishop is a New Zealand academic materials scientist, and is a full professor at the University of Canterbury, specialising in materials modelling of metallic and ceramic materials.

== Academic career ==
Bishop completed a Bachelor of Science degree at Carnegie Mellon University and a PhD titled Continuum models for intergranular films in silicon nitride and comparison to atomistic simulations at the Massachusetts Institute of Technology under guidance of W. Craig Carter as thesis advisor. Bishop undertook postdoctoral research and a Career Development Fellowship at the University of Oxford, before joining the faculty of the University of Canterbury in 2008. She was promoted to full professor at Canterbury in 2022. Bishop has held visiting positions at both Carnegie Mellon and Oxford universities. She is part of the MacDiarmid Institute for Advanced Materials and Nanotechnology research project Towards Zero Waste - Reconfigurable Systems. Bishop co-convenes an annual symposium Grain Boundaries, Interfaces, and Surfaces: Fundamental Structure-Property-Performance Relationships.

Bishop leads the Materials Cluster @ UC, an interdisciplinary research centre at Canterbury, working across the Colleges of Engineering and Science. She uses theoretical and computational materials to produce materials models, in order to better understand the structure and behaviour of metallic and ceramic materials. She has received funding from the Ministry of Business, Innovation and Employment Smart Ideas fund to research reducing the carbon footprint of metal extraction industries in New Zealand using molten oxide electrolysis. Bishop was the lead investigator on a 2020 Marsden grant titled Are interface transitions the key to controlling ferroelectric aging and fatigue?, in collaboration with two professors at Purdue University.

== Selected works ==
- R. Edwin Garcı́a; Yet-Ming Chiang; W. Craig Carter; Pimpa Limthongkul; Catherine M. Bishop (2005). "Microstructural Modeling and Design of Rechargeable Lithium-Ion Batteries". Journal of the Electrochemical Society. 152 (1): A255. doi:10.1149/1.1836132. Wikidata Q105758822.
- M. Bäurer; S.-J. Shih; C. Bishop; M.P. Harmer; D. Cockayne; M.J. Hoffmann (2010). "Abnormal grain growth in undoped strontium and barium titanate". Acta Materialia. 58 (1): 290–300. doi:10.1016/j.actamat.2009.09.007. Wikidata Q105758816.
- R.Edwin Garcı́a; Catherine M Bishop; W.Craig Carter (2004). "Thermodynamically consistent variational principles with applications to electrically and magnetically active systems". Acta Materialia. 52 (1): 11–21. doi:10.1016/j.actamat.2003.08.020. Wikidata Q105758823.
- Aleksandra J. Gardecka; Catherine Bishop; Darryl Lee; Sacha Corby; Ivan P. Parkin; Andreas Kafizas; Susan Krumdieck (2018). "High efficiency water splitting photoanodes composed of nano-structured anatase-rutile TiO2 heterojunctions by pulsed-pressure MOCVD". Applied Catalysis B: Environmental. 224: 904–911. doi:10.1016/j.apcatb.2017.11.033. Wikidata Q105758799.
- Catherine M Bishop; W Craig Carter (2002). "Relating atomistic grain boundary simulation results to the phase-field model". Computational Materials Science. 25 (3): 378–386. doi:10.1016/s0927-0256(02)00241-0. Wikidata Q105758826.
- Catherine M. Bishop; Ming Tang; Rowland M. Cannon; W.Craig Carter (2006). "Continuum modelling and representations of interfaces and their transitions in materials". Materials Science and Engineering A. 422 (1–2): 102–114. doi:10.1016/j.msea.2006.01.013. Wikidata Q105758819.
