= Now We Are Six (disambiguation) =

Now We Are Six is a book of children's verses by A. A. Milne, with illustrations by E. H. Shepard, first published in 1927.

Now We Are Six may also refer to:

- Now We Are Six (album), by Steeleye Span (1974)
- Now We Are Six, album by Happy Flowers (1986)
