= Stuart Saunders Smith =

American musician

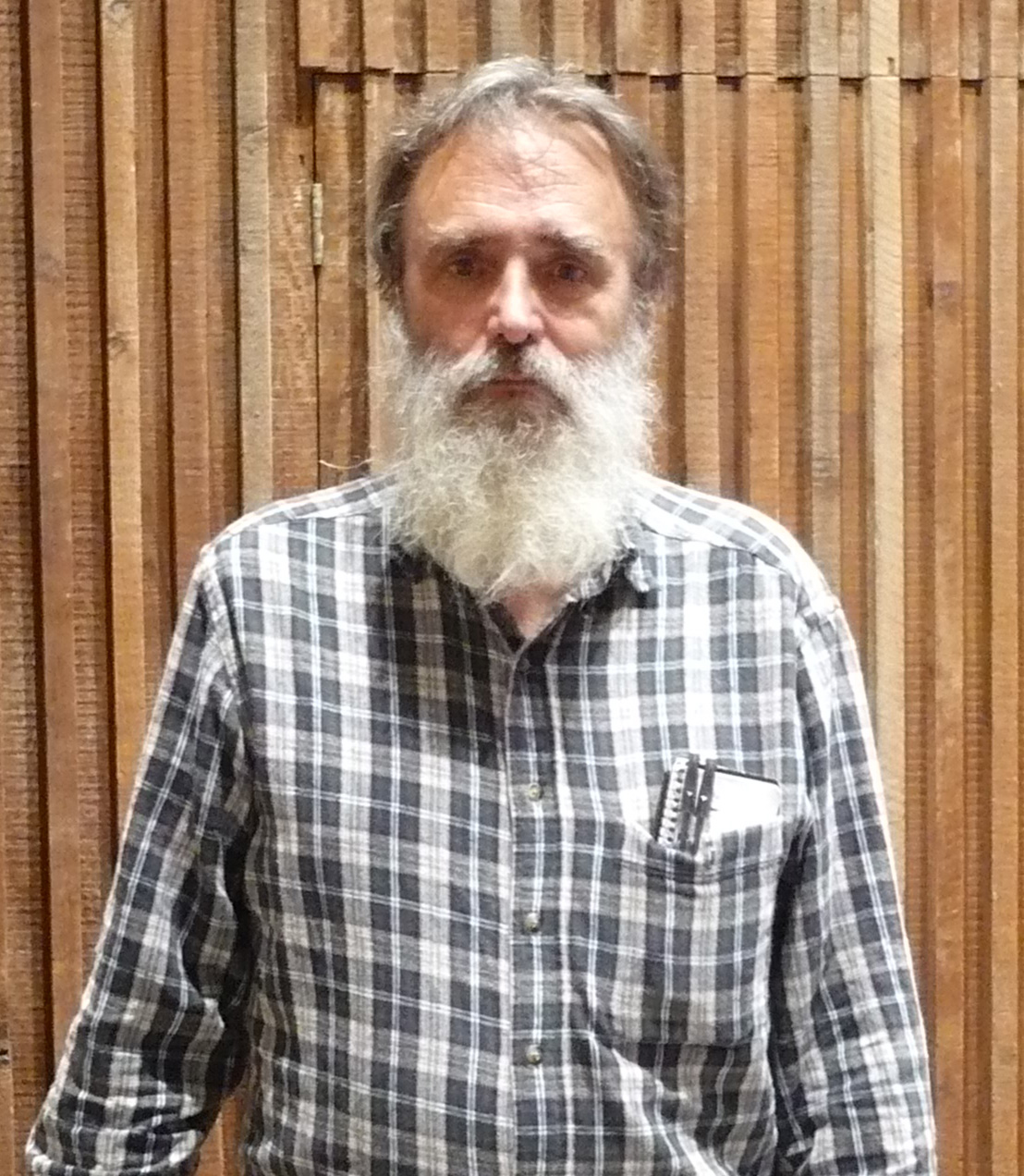
Stuart Saunders Smith in 2008

Stuart Saunders Smith (16 March 1948 - 3 June 2024) was an American composer and percussionist. After having studied composition and music theory at three music institutions, Smith was based in Vermont, United States, with his wife Sylvia. He produced almost 200 compositions, half of which were written for percussion instruments with a focus on the vibraphone.

== Life ==
Smith was born in Portland, Maine. He started studying composition and percussion at six years old with Charles Newcomb, who was previously a vaudeville performer and exposed him to many musical styles e.g. Latin music, waltz, Dixieland. Smith has attributed a "physical" form of music composition to Newcomb. From the age of 13, Smith began performing publicly in clubs and dance venues. At the age of 18, Smith went on to Berklee School of Music where he furthered his studies in counterpoint, harmony and musical arrangements. He continued to study percussion and composition at Hartt College of Music from 1967 to 1972. He received his DMA in music composition at the University of Illinois Urbana-Champaign in 1977, where he studied under Herbert Brün, Salvatore Martirano, and Benjamin Johnston.

Alongside Newcomb, his other percussion teachers included Fred Budha, Al Dawson, Alexander Lepak, and Thomas Siwe.

== Music ==
Smith has composed over 150 works. In categorizing Smith's work, four primary areas of focus have been identified: music of extreme rhythmic and melodic intricacy; musical mobiles with instrumental parts that freely interact; text-based compositions; trans-media systems for any kind of performing artist(s). Smith uses language (in the form of body language, melody and speech) as the core of each of these styles.

Smith's percussion-theater music forms the core of that literature with notable pieces includingPoems I II III, ...And Points North, Tunnels, Clay Singing and twenty-six compositions of that genre.

Smith has recorded with compositions on labels such as New World Records, Ravello Records, Centaur, Innova, 11 West Records, O.O. Discs, Equilibrium, GAC, Soundset Recordings, and Chen Li.

In addition, anthologies of new music have included his theater music, and music of rhythmic intricacy: Here and There, MacMillan Publishing, New York City; Return and Recall, Assembling Press, New York City; Faces, ASUC, New York City; and Transitions and Leaps, Mark Batty Publications, New York City. Articles on his music have been published regularly throughout the years in such journals as: Perspectives of New Music, Percussive Notes, Interface, and ex tempore.

== Writings ==
Smith is the author of several articles on his music and the music of others. There have also been a number of articles written about Smith's music.

Perspectives of New Music

"Communications" by Stuart Smith

- Vol. 11, no. 2, pp. 269–277 (1973)

"A Portrait of Herbert Brün" by Stuart Smith and Sylvia Smith

- Vol. 17, no. 2, pp. 56–75 (1979)

"Visual Music" by Sylvia Smith and Stuart Smith

- Volume 20, no. 1–2, pp. 75–93 (1981)

"A Composer’s Mosaic" by Stuart Smith

- Vol. 22, no. 1–2, pp. 275–285 (1983)

"Return and Recall (Improvisation – The First Step) at U. M. B. C." by Stuart Smith

- Vol. 22, no. 1–2, pp. 286–289 (1983)

"Notes on Stuart Smith’s Return and Recall: A View From Within" by Linda Fiore

- Vol. 22, no. 1–2, pp. 290–302 (1983)

"Aussie Blue (Day in the Summer in 1985) for Piano (Pianist Also Plays Triangle and Sings) Commissioned by Chris Mann" by Stuart Saunders Smith

- Vol. 26, no. 2, pp. 300–305 (1988)

"Against Definition" by Stuart Smith

- Vol. 32, no. 1, pp. 214–218 (1994)

"To Suffer Music" by Stuart Smith

- Vol. 34, no. 1, pp. 106–112 (1996)

"Showing and Saying" by Stuart Smith

- Vol. 34, no. 1, pp. 116–121 (1996)

"Inner-views: A Conversation between Stuart Saunders Smith and Tom Goldstein" by Stuart Saunders Smith and Tom Goldstein

- Vol. 36, no. 2, pp. 187–199 (1998)

"Stuart Saunders Smith's Links No. 6 (Song Interiors): How Can I Tell what I Think Until I See What I Sing?" by Ron Hess

- Vol. 47, no. 1, pp. 211–232 (2009)

"Interview with Stuart Saunders Smith" by Kristina Der

- Vol. 55, no. 2, pp. 219–233 (2017)

Percussive Notes

"Music Notation as Visual Art" by Sylvia Smith and Stuart Smith

- Vol. 20, No. 1, pp. 49–54 (1981)

"Focus on Performance: The Noble Snare – A Concert of Snare Drum Solos" by Brian Johnson

- Vol. 28, No. 1, pp. 52–54 (1989)

"Having Words With John Cage" by Stuart Saunders Smith

- Vol. 30, No. 3, pp. 48–52 (1992)

"Percussion in Discussion (Language, Percussion, and My Speech Songs)" by Stuart Saunders Smith

- Vol. 31, No. 8, pp. 71–73 (1993)

"Thinking On Tools – Touching My Trade – or – The Touch in Time Is Mine" by Stuart Saunders Smith

- Vol. 31, No. 8, pp. 74–79 (1993)

"Percussion Ecology: Doing More With Less – Music for a Small Planet" by Stuart Saunders Smith

- Vol. 32, No. 1, pp. 62–63 (1994)

"Against Definition" by Stuart Saunders Smith

- Vol. 32, No. 1, pp. 63–64 (1994)

"Showing and Saying (1994)" by Stuart Saunders Smith

- Vol. 33, No. 2, pp. 68–70 (1995)

"The Links Series of Vibraphone Essays: A Personal View/A Concert Review" by Christopher Shultis

- Vol. 34, no. 3, pp. 70–74 (1996)

"An Interview with Sylvia Smith on the 30th Anniversary of Smith Publications and Sonic Arts Editions" by Carrie Rose

- Vol. 42, No. 4, pp. 74–79 (2004)

"The Geography of Time: The Links Series of Vibraphone Essays (1974–1994)" by Stuart Saunders Smith

- Vol. 43, No. 2, pp. 58–62 (2005)

"The History and Significance of The Noble Snare" by Jason Baker

- Vol. 44, No. 3, pp. 72–77 (2006)

"Stuart Saunders Smith's Links No. 6 (Song Interiors) How Can I Tell What I Think Until I See What I Sing?" by Ron Hess

- Vol. 48, No. 3, pp. 42–50 (2010)

"Stuart Saunders Smith’s Ground for Solo Glockenspiel: Clear Complexity" by Rob Falvo

- Vol. 49, no. 3, pp. 42–49 (2011)

"Interview with Stuart Smith: On the Formation and Early Years of the PAS New Music/Research Committee" by Dr. Eugene Novotney

- Vol. 49, No.5, pp. 32–33 (2011)

"The Silence… An Introduction to the Inner World of Stuart Saunders Smith" by Jose "Zeca" Lacerda

- Vol. 50, no. 6, pp. 40–47 (2012)

"Amidst the Noise: Stuart Saunders Smith’s Percussion Music" by Jeremy Muller

- Vol. 52, no. 4, pp. 6–15 (2014)

"Night Suite: Interviews with Stuart Saunders Smith and Berndt Thurner" by Rose Martin

- Vol. 56, no.3, pp. 20–25 (2018)

Percussive Notes Research Edition

"Music Notation as Visual Art" by Sylvia Smith and Stuart Smith

- Vol. 18, no. 2, pp. 7–14 (1981)

"Interview with John Cage" by Dr. Stuart Smith

- Vol. 21, No. 3, pp. 3–7 (1983)

"Stuart Smith’s Links Series" by John P. Welsh

- Vol. 23, No. 3, pp. 75–89 (1983)

"Lecture by Dr. Thomas DeLio" by Dr. Thomas DeLio

- Vol. 22, No. 6, pp. 76–81 (1984)

"Scribing Sound" by Sylvia Smith

- Vol. 23, No. 3, pp. 34–51 (1985)

Percussionist

"Avant Garde Percussion" by Stuart Smith

- Vol. 10, No. 1, pp. 3–4 (1972)

"The Early Percussion Music of John Cage" by Stuart Smith

- Vol. 16, No. 1, pp. 16–27 (1978)

"Lou Harrison’s 'Fugue' for Percussion" by Stuart Smith

- Vol. 16, No. 2, pp. 47–56 (1979)

Interface

"Music in the Air Here and There – A Radio Landscape" by John P. Welsh

- Vol. 13, No. 4, pp. 199–223 (1984)

"Viewing Mobile Minds: Stuart Smith's Gifts" by John P. Welsh

- Vol. 16, No. 4, pp. 219–245 (1987)

ex tempore

"Thoughts of Stuart Saunders Smith on Quakerism, Trans-Media and Democracy" by Stuart Smith and Christine Humphries

- Vol. 7, No. 2 (1995)

"Family Portraits: 'Delbert (great-grandfather)' and Self Interview on the Thirtieth Year of Smith Publications and Sonic Art Editions" by Sylvia Smith

- Vol. 13, No. 2 (2007)

"A Composer’s Mosaic: Selected Entries from the Composing Journals of Stuart Saunders Smith (1985–1986)" by Stuart Saunders Smith

- Vol. 14, No. 1 (2008)

"Interview with Stuart Saunders Smith" by Jude Traxler

- Vol. 14, No. 1 (2008)

Smith is the author of two books: Twentieth Century Music Scores, an anthology, (Prentice-Hall, 1989), co-edited with Thomas DeLio; Words and Spaces, an anthology, (University Press, 1989), co-authored with Thomas DeLio. In addition, he is currently writing Composing, Thoughts, a book of experimental writings about aesthetics, language, composition, listening, and religion. Part I of this book was published in The Modern Percussion Revolution: Journeys of the Progressive Artist, edited by Kevin Lewis and Gustavo Aguilar (Routledge, 2014). John P. Welsh's The Music of Stuart Saunders Smith is published by Greenwood Press (1995).

Smith's service on the behalf of music includes organizing hundreds of concerts of new music, functioning as a lobbyist for the arts for the American Society of University Composers during the Reagan presidency, and as Executive Editor of Percussive Notes, Research Edition from 1982 to 1984.

== Awards ==
His awards and honors include three UMBC Research Grants, The Hartt College Distinguished Alumni Award, East/West Artist Award, three Maryland State Artists Fellowships, the National Endowment for the Arts Composer's Fellowship, Percussive Arts Society Service Award and the Atlantic Center's Master Artist Award.

== Testimonials ==
Smith titled his ongoing series of vibraphone compositions "Links," a name that reflects the connections within and between his individual works. Furthermore, the title represents the intersection of his various professional roles, including his work as a composer, performer, educator, writer, and musical activist.

Originally from Maine, Smith maintained an independent artistic direction despite studying under several influential composition teachers. While he cites jazz as a primary influence, his music does not explicitly mirror that genre or the specific styles of his instructors. Instead, his work integrates various musical elements into a unified style where the original influences are no longer distinctly recognizable. (Milton Babbitt, quoted in Welsh 1995, p. ix)

Ben Johnston has noted Smith's contributions to jazz and open-form composition, attributing his approach to his background as both a percussionist and a jazz improviser. Johnston suggests that Smith’s work is heavily influenced by a "poetic consciousness," resulting in a compositional style that prioritizes a specific artistic center of gravity over traditional ratiocination or expression. (quoted in Welsh 1995, p. xii)

== Compositions ==
1970

- Poems I, II, III for five brake drums and narrator
- One for Syl for solo vibraphone

1971

- One for Two for alto saxophone and organ
- A Gift for Bessie for violin, piano, bassoon, and percussion

1972

- Here and There for shortwave radio, piano interior (percussion) and any melody instrument or voice
- Legacy Variations No. 1 for any three sustaining melody instruments
- Legacy Variations No. 99 for any three sustaining melody instruments
- Three for Two for violin and viola
- Two for Four for percussion quartet (orchestra bells, vibraphone, cymbal, large and medium gong, xylophone, marimba, timpani, temple blocks, and various small percussion instruments).

1973

- Rock Garden for organ and two percussion

1974

- Faces for oboe and clarinet
- Gifts for keyboard and any two melody instruments
- Links for solo vibraphone

1975

- Links no. 2 for solo vibraphone
- Links no. 3 for solo vibraphone

1976

- Return and Recall / Initiatives and Reactions: Studies in the Concept of Group Composition performance systems for actors, dancers, musicians, mimes, etc.

1977

- Pinetop for solo piano

1978

- Flight for flute and piano

1979

- Blue for trumpet, drum set and double bass

1980

- Notebook for any instruments in any combination
- Notebook, Part II for one or two pianos (may be played with Notebook)

1981

- Songs I–IX for percussionist-actor (small percussion instruments and various household items from kitchen)

1982

- Tunnels a solo music-text-theater composition for keyboard, string, or multiple percussion
- Links No. 4 (Monk) for solo vibraphone

1983

- Blue Too for solo drum set
- By Language Embellished: I percussion / theater opera for speaking voice

1984

- Some Household Words I–XVI for solo speaking voice

1985

- Aussie Blue for solo piano
- In Bingham for solo speaker/narrator

1987

- Links No. 5 (Sitting on the Edge of Nothing) for solo vibraphone with offstage orchestra bells and chimes

1988

- The Noble Snare for solo snare drum

1989

- Links No. 6 (Song Interiors) for vibraphone and piano
- Links No. 7 (New England Night Weave) for solo vibraphone

1990

- ...And Points North a music-theater work for solo percussionist/narrator (wood block, small Peking opera gong, Tibetan cymbal, glass wind chimes, owl hooter, hawk screamer, pod rattles, Audubon bird call, "found" instruments from the city and the woods)
- Transitions and Leaps for two or more performers performing any sounds/actions

1991

- "as if time would heal by its passing for solo marimba
- Family Portraits: Sylvia (wife) for solo piano
- Family Portraits: Ivy (grandmother) for solo piano
- Family Portraits: Earle (father) for solo piano
- Hawk for solo oboe
- In Common for flute and vibraphone
- Links No. 8 (Confessions-Witness to 48 Things) for vibraphone with flute
- Nightshade for violin or medium voice and two percussionists, each playing orchestra bells (glockenspiel), tam-tam or gong, two cymbals, two triangles

1992

- Good Night for solo marimba
- Links No. 9 (Mosque) for solo vibraphone
- Meetings for flute, vibraphone and piano

1993

- Each Moment and Ending for keyboard percussion quintet
- Part for flute, piano, and cello
- Thaw for solo orchestra bells (glockenspiel)
- Links No. 10 (Who Are We? Where Are We?) for solo vibraphone

1994

- Family Portraits: Brenda (first cousin) for solo piano
- Links No. 11 (Regions I–XXI) for three vibraphones
- Wind in the Channel for solo tenor recorder

1995

- Family Portraits: Delbert (great-grandfather) for percussionist/narrator (playing woodblock, logs, and newspaper)
- Strays for xylophone and tenor recorder or flute

1996

- Family Portraits: Cubba (grandfather) for trumpet, flute, and five percussion (tom-toms and triangles)
- Family Portraits: Mom and Dad Together for solo double bass
- Polka in Treblinka for percussion trio (bass drum, xylophone, snare drum and high hat)

1997

- Family Portrait: Self (in 14 stations) for solo piano
- The Night is Never Long for piccolo and xylophone

1998

- Closing for solo guitar
- Fences in Three Tragedies for solo piano
- When Music is Missing, Music Sings for two percussionists playing five "found" instruments each

1999

- All That is Left orchestra bells (glockenspiel) duet
- And Sometimes the Ears for solo tenor steel drum
- Even Song for solo orchestra bells (glockenspiel)
- Leaving for solo marimba

2000

- Books of Flutes for solo flute
- Bones for percussion, piano, and 3 or 4 melody instruments
- Endless for two flutes and two vibraphones
- The Geography of Streams for percussion trio (xylophone solo with two sets of orchestra bells, two bass drums, claves, and woodblocks)
- Thinking About Anne Sexton duo for vibraphone and speaking voice

2001

- Breath for mezzo-soprano and orchestra bells (glockenspiel)
- Family Portraits: Ligeia (daughter) for soprano voice and piano
- Light A Dew for solo double bass
- Minor for solo violin

2002

- Asleep in Thorns for guitar and flute
- Brush for solo drum set
- Dad's Time Had Come for solo xylophone
- Dead Reckoning for tenor recorder trio
- Things That Grow Smaller for flute, clarinet, bassoon, piano, and percussion
- Two Lights for solo drum set

2003

- Family Portraits: Embden Pond for solo alto flute with two vibraphones
- Willow for solo cello
- Wounded an antiphonal composition for 3 or 4 xylophones

2004

- Hearts for solo violin
- Ground for solo orchestra bells (glockenspiel)
- Plenty thirty-four movements for solo vibraphone

2005

- Clay Singing for solo percussion with spoken text
- Family Portraits: Erika (daughter) for vibraphone and violin
- In Hours Like These for soprano voice and orchestra bells (glockenspiel)
- A River, Rose for violin and vibraphone
- When The Body Betrays for tenor voice and double seconds steel drums
- Women in Meeting flute duet

2006

- The Authors for solo marimba with spoken text
- Big Falls, Little Falls for percussion quartet and off-stage percussion ensemble (4)
- Castine for marimba with offstage voice
- Magdalene for soprano saxophone and two percussion
- Over for solo orchestra bells (glockenspiel)
- Rose for flute with spoken text and movement
- A Vietnam Memorial opera for speaking voice and vibraphone

2007

- Among Us for solo piano
- Light for two voices
- Light in Each One for solo alto flute
- The Lines of Ageing for solo vibraphone
- The Narrow Path trio for two vibraphones and orchestra bells (glockenspiel)
- Quilt for vibraphone and orchestra bells
- Seven Seasons for contralto voice and vibraphone
- Angels for percussion trio, three triangles each
- as the days get shorter for solo bass clarinet (revised 2018)

2008

- Mornings for solo vibraphone
- Apart for 2 orchestra bells and vibraphone
- The Narrow Path for 2 vibraphones and orchestra bells
- Family Portraits: Justin for vibraphone/voice
- Shine for piccolo and orchestra bells

2009

- The Home of the Brave for percussionist/actor performing on a 2X4, 3 bottles, and 5 metal objects
- To Freshen the Moment for cello and vibraphone
- Far Away for solo chimes
- Wait for solo marimba
- GodSongs for actor singer and orchestra bells (one player) (revised 2018)

2010

- Time Comes Full Circle for cello and violin
- Thicket for orchestra bells or piano
- All Too Human for soprano and clarinet
- Winter, Knee Deep for flute/theater
- They Looked Like Strangers for solo vibraphone
- Winter Songs for violin/theater

2011

- Three Winter Carols for orchestra bells/voice
- Winter for any winds, strings, keyboard, mallet percussion
- New England for vibraphone

2012

- Palm Sunday for piano
- A Liturgy of the Hours for flute
- Our Father for soprano
- Heaven and Earth for organ
- Five Books for orchestra bells

2013

- Blessings for soprano and clarinet
- A Good Friday for clarinet
- By Hand for bongos
- The Lilies of the Field for vibraphone and female voice
- Across: Lines for orchestra bells/xylophone/vibraphone/marimba/chimes/voice, one player
- My Friend Gita Said: for marimba/voice
- Lyric for percussion theater
- The Shapes Beneath the Ground for marimba

2014

- Crystal Night for violin and percussion quartet
- Memory for any soloist
- Lazarus for piano or vibraphone/actor/singer
- Past Regrets for double bass/singer/actor or cello
- Lady Slippers for harp, viola, alto flute
- Queen Anne's Lace for vibraphone
- The Deep for vibraphone

2015

- Re:Verse trans-media work for any two performance artists
- Wellspring for orchestra bells
- Echo for 1–8 singers
- Evening Primrose for vibraphone solo with two drumsets
- Commune, vibraphone concerto with small chamber ensemble
- Meadow Sweet for marimba and clarinet
- Here's the Sun for cello solo

2016

- Inner Light for solo violin
- Halo for solo vibraphone
- The Circle of Light for flute solo and eight luminists/actors
- Family Portraits: Our Home for soprano voice and vibraphone
- Easter in Bingham for alto saxophone and actor/vibraphone
- Milk and Honey for vibraphone and harp
- Alone for solo vibraphone
- Men's Culture for soprano saxophone and xylophone, two actors
- My Romance for solo orchestra bells or vibraphone or piano
- Alone in a Room for solo orchestra bells and percussion quartet (triangles)

2017

- Emily for jazz/electric guitar and piano
- Mercy for large percussion orchestra
- Dignity for soprano voice, vibraphone, and actor
- History for marimba, vibraphone, and piano
- When We Were Giants for guitar (2014–2017)
- The Untold Range for 3–5 percussionists, chimes, and pre-recorded environmental sounds
- Lace for orchestra bells duet and soprano

2018

- as the days get shorter for solo bass clarinet
- Envelope Poems for vibraphonist / vocalist and offstage melody instrument
- Winter Taps for 2 actors and vibraphone duet
- Lace for orchestra bells duet and soprano
- Honesty for flute and vibraphone
- Family Portraits: Harriet for vibraphone
- Family Portraits: Harpreet for violin and vibraphone
- Holy Week for vibraphone
- Compassion for vibraphone
- My Better Angel for vibraphone
- Family Portraits: Self at 70 for flute, double bass, and drumset
- Family Portraits: Sylvia at 70 for pian

2019

- Afterlife concerto for marimba with large percussion orchestra
- Poetry for marimba and actor/actress
- A Friend's End for actor/actress and offstage flute and chimes
- Regrets for double bass and soprano
- Older Years for alto flute and actor
- The Vibraphone Poems for vibraphone and voice (one player)
- Peace for bass flute, flute, piccolo (one player)
- Eternity for solo vibraphone
- Love for violin and piano

2020

- Shattered for solo drum set
- Renoir's Piano for piano, vibraphone, and flute
- Past for marimba solo
- East of Eden for soprano saxophone and drum set
- Inner Light for violin, piano, and vibraphone
- Dusk for steel band
- Cries and Whispers for vibraphone and speaking/singing voice (one player)
- Shoreline for viola and vibraphone
- Emotion for large percussion ensemble
- Happy Hour for solo vibraphone

2021

- Sadness for double bass and soprano voice
- Life for piano and voice (one player)
- Sadness for double bass and soprano
- Some Household Words for sound text percussion duo
- Tears for vibraphone and string quartet
- Letters for guitar and voice (one player)
- Past for solo marimba
- Another Echo for any wind or string instrument and piano or vibraphone
- To All of Those for any string or woodwind instrument
- Vermont Chimes for chimes, two glockenspiels, two bass drums, and two triangles
- Violets for solo drum set

== Books ==
- Smith, Stuart Saunders. Twentieth Century Scores. Prentice-Hall.
- Smith, Stuart Saunders, and Thomas DeLio (1989). Words and Spaces: An Anthology of Twentieth Century Musical Experiments in Language and Sonic Environments. University Press of America. ISBN 0-8191-7425-4. ISBN 978-0-8191-7425-3.

== Discography ==
- Wind in the Channel, O.O. Disc (Out of Print)
  - 1. Hawk (1991), solo oboe
  - 2. Family Portraits: Brenda (1994), solo piano
  - 3. California Driving (1995), solo voice
  - 4. Return and Recall (1976)
  - 5. Notebook (1980), 2-piano version
  - 6. Wind in the Channel (1994), tenor recorder/voice/percussion
  - 7. Gifts (1974), flute, vibraphone, piano
  - 8. Pinetop (1976–1977), solo piano
  - 9. In Bingham (1985), solo voice
  - 10. Aussie Blue (1985), solo piano
- Music/Theater, Centaur (CRC 2633)
  - 1. by Language Embellished: I (1983–1984), solo voice/percussion
- The Year Begins to Be Ripe, 11 West Records/Smith Publications
  - 1. Poems I, II, III (1970), 5 brake drums, narrator
  - 2. In Hours Like These (2005), soprano, orchestra bells
  - 3. Family Portraits: Delbert (1994), percussion/voice
  - 4. Xylophone Poems No. 1: Went Forth (1999), xylophone/voice
  - 5. Thinking About Anne Sexton, vibraphone (2000), narrator
- The Noble Snare, 11 West Records/Smith Publications
  - 1. The Noble Snare (1988), solo snare drum
- Breath, 11 West Records/Smith Publications
  - 1. Each Moment An Ending (1993), marimba, xylophone, vibraphone, orchestra bells, chimes
  - 2. Blue Too (1981–1983), solo drumset
  - 3. ...And Points North (1990), percussion/voice
  - 4. Links No. 11 (1994), 3 vibraphones
  - 5. Breath (2001), mezzo-soprano, orchestra bells
  - 6. Polka in Treblinka (1996), xylophone, snare drum, high-hat, bass drum
  - 7. Thaw (1993), orchestra bells
  - 8. Family Portraits: Cubba (1996), trumpet, percussion, flute
- Withered Leaves – New Birth, Disques Christal (France)
  - 1. Links (1974), vibraphone
  - 2. Links No. 2 (1975), vibraphone
  - 3. Links No. 3 (1975), vibraphone
- In Common, Equilibrium
  - 1. In Common (1991), flute, vibraphone
- Book of Horizons, New World Records
  - 1. Fences, In Three Tragedies (1998), solo piano
- When Still, Soundset Recordings
  - 1. Links No. 2 (1975), vibraphone
  - 2. The Starving Month (2012), vibraphone
- McCormick Percussion Group, Ravello Records
  - 1. Nightshade (1991), violin, 2 percussion
- Trio Spectra, GAC (Sweden)
  - 1. Polka in Treblinka (1996), xylophone, snare drum, high-hat, bass drum
- At Sixty (Selections), 11 West Records/Smith Publications
  - CD#1
    - 1. Women in Meeting (2005), flute duo
    - 2. Polka in Treblinka (1996), xylophone, snare drum, high-hat, bass drum
    - 3. Over (2006), orchestra bells
    - 4. Wounded (2003), xylophone
    - 5. Magdalene (2006), soprano sax, 2 percussion
    - 6. Notebook (1980), any instruments
  - CD#2
    - 1. In Bingham (1985), solo voice
    - 2. Rose (2006), flute/dancer/actor
    - 3. Family Portraits: Embden Pond (2003), alto flute, 2 vibraphones
    - 4. A River, Rose (2005), violin, vibraphone
    - 5. Hearts (2004), violin
    - 6. Good Night (1992), marimba/voice
- Books of Flutes, 11 West Records/Smith Publications
  - 1. Books of Flutes (2000), solo flute
  - 2. Legacy Variations No. 1 (1972), any three melody instruments
  - 3. Legacy Variations No. 99 (1972), any three melody instruments
  - 4. Family Portraits: Embden Pond (2003), alto flute, 2 vibraphones
- Crux, Chen Li Music
  - 1. Notebook (1980), any instruments
  - 2. Family Portraits: Ivy, Earle, Sylvia (1991), solo piano
  - 3. Here and There (1972), short-wave radio, piano interior, any melody instruments
  - 4. Strays (1995), tenor recorder and xylophone
- Strange Paths, Innova
  - 1. They Looked Like Strangers (2010), vibraphone
- Music for Keyboard Percussions, Ravello
  - 1. Apart (2008), 2 orchestra bells, vibraphone
- The Isle is Full of Noises, Centaur (CRC 3091)
  - 1. Family Portraits: Embden Pond (2003), alto flute, 2 vibraphones
- The Links Series of Vibraphone Essays, New World Records
  - The Links Series
    - Links-Links 11, vibraphone
- A River Rose, New World Records
  - 1. Hearts (2004), violin
  - 2. Three for Two (1972), violin and viola
  - 3. A Gift for Bessie (1971), violin, piano, bassoon, percussion
  - 4. Minor (2001), violin
  - 5. A River Rose (2005), violin, vibraphone
  - 6. I've Been Here Before (2009), violin and piano
- Hawk – The Saxophone Music of Stuart Saunders Smith, Chen Li Music
  - 1. Notebook (1980), any instruments
  - 2. Magdalene (2006), soprano sax and 2 percussion
  - 3. Husbands and Wives (2008), alto sax duet
  - 4. Hawk (2007), soprano sax solo
  - 5. One for Two (1971), alto sax and organ
- Plot: Music for Unspecified Instrumentation, Ravello Records
  - 1. Bones (2000), for any musicians and piano
  - 2. Winter (2010–2011), any instruments and voices
- Full Circle – NOISE Plays the Music of Stuart Saunders Smith, Centaur Records
  - 1. Flight (1978), for flute and piano
  - 2. Notebook (1980), any instruments
  - 3. Time Comes Full Circle (2010), for violin and cello
  - 4. Asleep in Thorns (2002), for flute and guitar
  - 5. Women in Meeting (2005), for two flutes
- Pluralities, Chen Li Music
  - 1. Lazarus, for piano and voice
- Lisa Cella – Shine, Chen Li Music
  - 4. Light in Each One, for solo flute
  - 5. Shine, for flute and orchestra bells
- New England, Kairos
  - 1–11. New England, for solo vibraphone
- Palm Sunday, New World Records
  - 1. Thicket (2010), for solo piano or orchestra bells
  - 2. Pinetop (1977), for solo piano
  - 3. Family Portraits: Self (in 14 Stations) (1997), for solo piano
  - 4. Palm Sunday (2012), for solo piano
  - 5. Among Us (2007), for solo piano
- At Seventy: The Percussion Music of Stuart Saunders Smith, Chen Li Music
  - CD#1
    - 1. Blue Too (1983), for solo drumset
    - 2. Brush (2002), for solo drumset
    - 3. Two Lights (2002), for solo drumset
    - 4. Family Portraits: Erika (daughter) (2005), for vibraphone and violin
    - 5. Dad's Time Had Come (2002), for solo xylophone
    - 6. Far Away (2009), for solo chimes
    - 7. Good Night (1992), for solo marimba
  - CD#2
    - 1. Queen Anne Lace (2014), for solo vibraphone
    - 2. The Narrow Path (2008), for orchestra bells, and two vibraphones
    - 3. Mercy (2017), for large percussion orchestra
  - CD#3
    - 1. Home of the Brave (2009), for spoken voice and junk
    - 2. Links No. 4 (Monk) (1982), for solo vibraphone
    - 3. Wait (2009), for solo marimba
    - 4. Songs I–IX (1981), for spoken voice and junk
    - 5. Poems I, II, III (1970), for brake drums and spoken voice (Ron Coulter, percussion; Susannah LeBaron, voice)
    - 6. Quilt (2007), for vibraphone and orchestra bells
    - 7. One For Syl (1970), for solo vibraphone
    - 7. Wellspring (2015), for solo orchestra bells
  - CD#4
    - 1. by Language Embellished: I (1983), for solo percussion theater
    - 2. The Lilies of the Field (2013), for soprano and vibraphone
    - 3. A Vietnam Memorial (2006), for speaking voice and vibraphone
  - CD#5
    - 1. The Authors (2006), for solo marimba with spoken text
    - 2. Angels (2007), for percussion trio
    - 3. Geography of Streams (2000), for percussion trio
    - 4. Two for Four (1972), for percussion quartet
    - 5. Rockgarden (1973), for organ and two percussion
  - CD#6 (Bonus Disc) Wind in the Channel
    - 1. Hawk (1991), solo oboe
    - 2. Family Portraits: Brenda (1994), solo piano
    - 3. California Driving (1995), solo voice
    - 4. Return and Recall (1976)
    - 5. Notebook (1980), 2-piano version
    - 6. Wind in the Channel (1994), tenor recorder/voice/percussion
    - 7. Gifts (1974), flute, vibraphone, piano
    - 8. Pinetop (1976–1977), solo piano
    - 9. In Bingham (1985), solo voice
    - 10. Aussie Blue (1985), solo piano
