= TZL =

TZL or tzl may refer to:

- TZL, the ASX symbol for TZ Limited, an American software company
- TZL, the IATA code for Tuzla International Airport, Bosnia and Herzegovina
- tzl, the ISO 639-3 code for Talossan language, Talossa
