= Catherine Bishop =

Catherine Bishop may refer to:

- Catherine Bishop (rower), British rower
- Catherine Bishop (historian), New Zealand-born historian
- Catherine Bishop (scientist), New Zealand materials scientist

== See also ==
- Catherine Bishopp (1744–1827), British noblewoman
