= Alejandro Strachan =

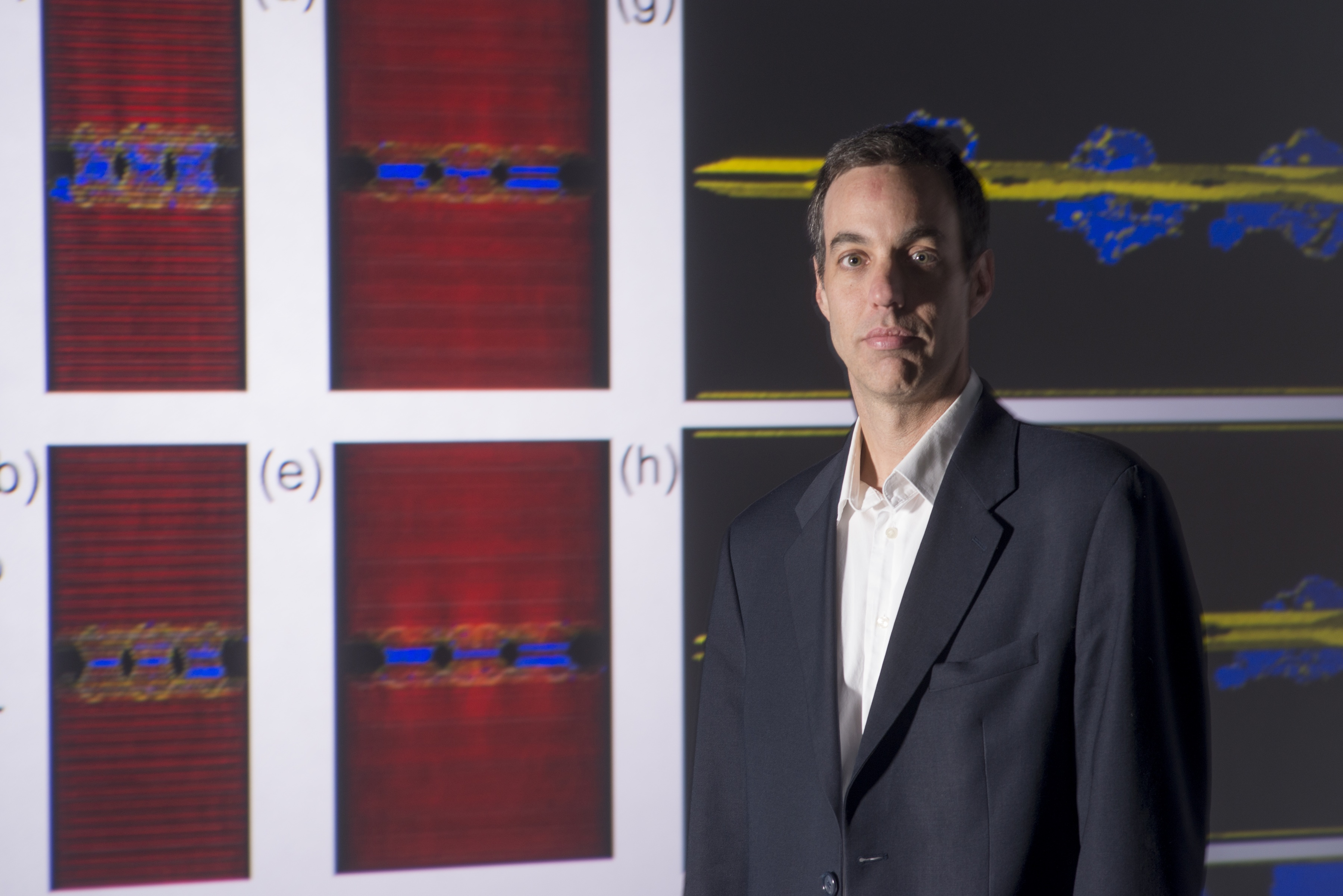
- Alejandro Strachan
- Education: University of Buenos Aires
- Known for: NNSA PRISM nanoHUB
- Scientific career
- Fields: Computational materials science Atomistic and molecular simulation
- Workplaces: Purdue University; Los Alamos National Laboratory; California Institute of Technology

Alejandro Strachan is a scientist in the field of computational materials and the Reilly Professor of Materials Engineering at Purdue University. Before joining Purdue University, he was a staff member at Los Alamos National Laboratory.

== Education ==
Strachan studied physics at the University of Buenos Aires, Argentina. He received his master's of science there in 1995, followed by his PhD in 1998. He then moved to Caltech, first as a postdoctoral scholar and then as a research scientist until 2002.

== Research and career ==
Strachan became a staff scientist in the Theoretical Division of Los Alamos National Laboratory in 2002, staying until becoming a faculty member at Purdue in 2005. He became a full professor in 2013 and was named the Reilly Professor of Materials Engineering in 2023.

Strachan's research focuses on the development of predictive atomistic and molecular simulation methodologies to describe materials, primarily density functional theory and molecular dynamics. With these methods he studies problems of technological importance including coupled electronic, thermal, and mechanical processes in nano-electronics, MEMS and energy conversion devices; thermo-mechanical response and chemistry of polymers, polymer composites, and molecular solids; as well as active materials including shape-memory alloys and high-energy density materials. He also actively focuses on uncertainty quantification across the field of materials modelling.

He previously served as the deputy director of the NNSA Center for the Prediction of Reliability, Integrity and Survivability of Microsystems (PRISM). He is currently co-principal investigator for the Network for Computational Nanotechnology (NCN) and nanoHUB (with principal investigator Gerhard Klimeck) and co-leads the Center for Predictive Material and Devices (c-PRIMED), also with Klimeck.

Strachan is also active in education, particularly through nanoHUB, including the fully open and online course "From Atoms to Materials: Predictive Theories and Simulations".

== Awards ==
- Purdue University Teaching for Tomorrow award, 2007.
- The Minerals, Metals and Materials Society Early Career Faculty Fellow Award 2009.
- Purdue University College of Engineering Faculty Excellence Award. Team Award: PRISM, 2009.
- Purdue University Faculty Scholar (2012-2017)
- R&D100 2020 winner, nanoHUB: making simulation and data pervasive.

== Selected publications and editorials ==
- Strachan, A.; van Duin, A.C.; Chakraborty, D.; Dasgupta, S.; Goddard III, W.A. (2003). "Shock waves in high-energy materials: the initial chemical events in nitramine RDX". Physical Review Letters. 91 (9) 098301. Bibcode:2003PhRvL..91i8301S. doi:10.1103/PhysRevLett.91.098301. PMID 14525217.
- Li, C.; Strachan, A. (2011). "Molecular dynamics predictions of thermal and mechanical properties of thermoset polymer EPON862/DETDA". Polymer. 52 (13): 2920–2928. doi:10.1016/j.polymer.2011.04.041.
- Onofrio, N.; Guzman, D.; Strachan, A. (2015). "Atomic origin of ultrafast resistance switching in nanoscale electrometallization cells". Nature Materials. 14 (4): 440–446. Bibcode:2015NatMa..14..440O. doi:10.1038/nmat4221. PMID 25730392.
- Strachan, A.; Klimeck, K.; Lundstrom, M. (2010). "Cyber-enabled simulations in nanoscale science and engineering". Computing in Science & Engineering. 12 (2): 12–17. Bibcode:2010CSE....12b..12S. doi:10.1109/MCSE.2010.38. S2CID 36617268.
- Foiles, S.; McDowell, D.; Strachan, A. (2019). "Preface for focus issue on uncertainty quantification in materials modeling". Modelling and Simulation in Materials Science and Engineering. 27 (8): 080301. Bibcode:2019MSMSE..27h0301F. doi:10.1088/1361-651X/ab46d6. OSTI 1574709. S2CID 210802694.
