= Gerhard Klimeck =

German-American electrical engineer (born 1966)

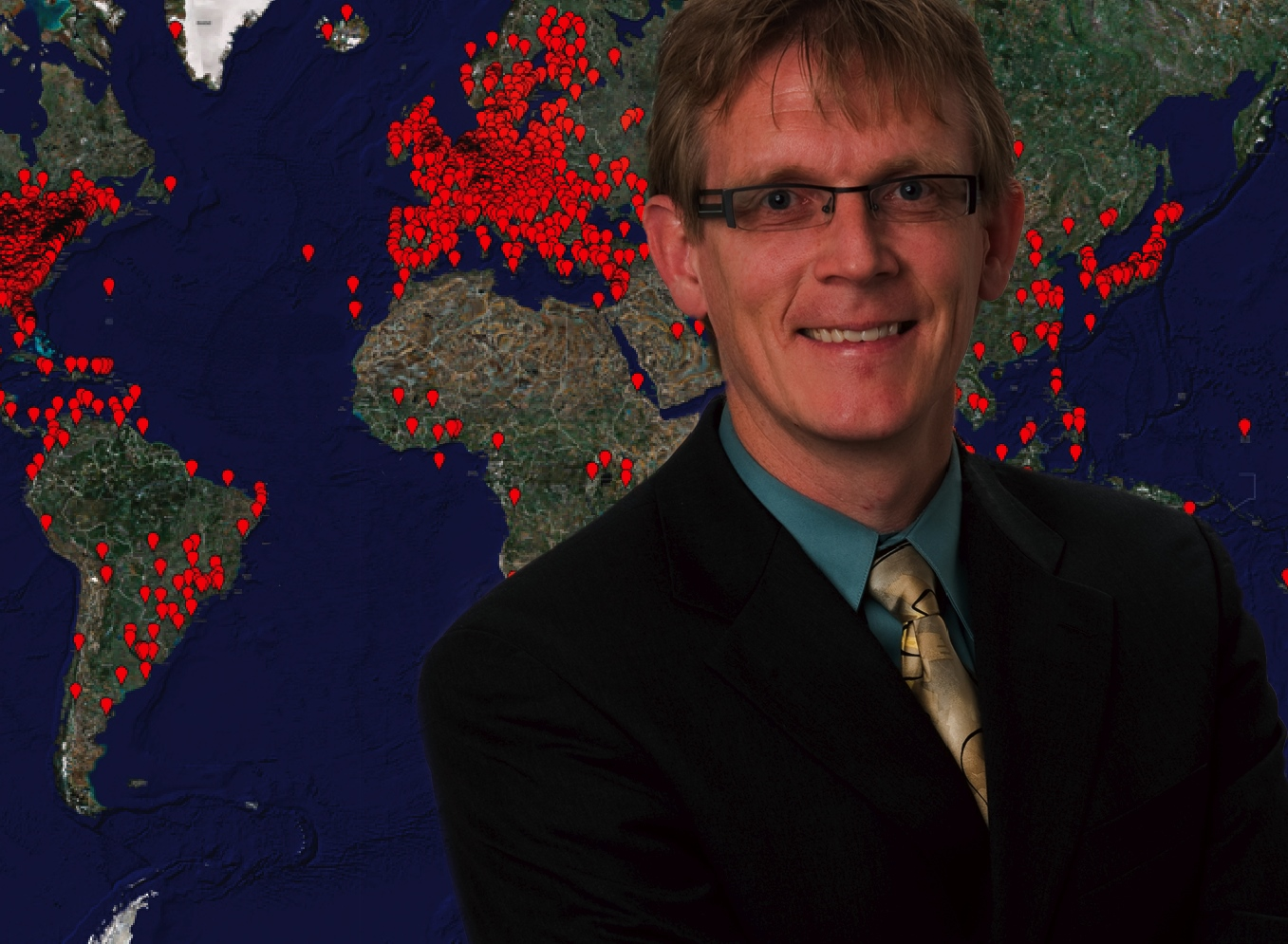
- Born: 15 March 1966; Essen, West Germany
- Education: Ruhr University Bochum; Purdue University
- Known for: Nanoelectronics, nanoHUB
- Scientific career
- Fields: Electrical engineering Electron transport Quantum mechanics
- Workplaces: Purdue University; University of Texas at Dallas; California Institute of Technology

Gerhard Klimeck is a German-American scientist and author in the field of nanotechnology. He is a professor of Electrical and Computer Engineering at Purdue University School of Electrical and Computer Engineering.

As the director of nanoHUB, he conducts the technical developments and strategies of nanoHUB, which annually serves million users worldwide with online simulations, tutorials, and seminars.

== Education ==
Klimeck received his PhD. in 1994 from Purdue University where he studied electron transport through quantum dots, resonant tunneling diodes and 2-D electron gases. His German electrical engineering degree (Dipl.-Ing.) in 1990 from Ruhr University Bochum was concerned with the study of laser noise propagation.

== Career ==
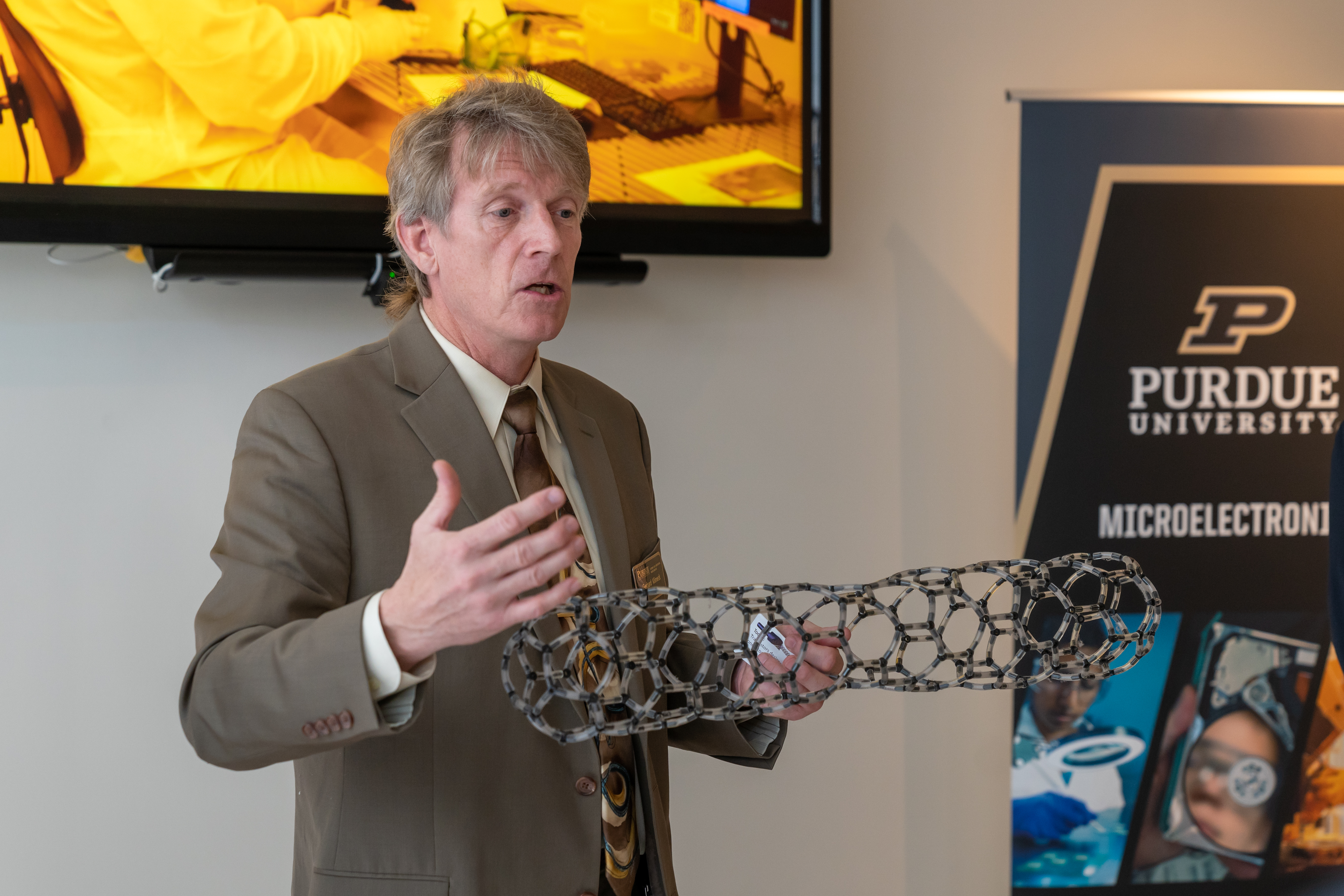
Klimeck in 2022

Klimeck's research interest is in the modeling of nanoelectronic devices, parallel cluster computing, genetic algorithms, and parallel image processing. He has been driving the development of the Nanoelectronic Modeling Tool NEMO since 1994. Klimeck was the technical group supervisor of the High Performance Computing Group and a principal scientist at the NASA Jet Propulsion Laboratory. Previously, he was a member of technical staff at the Central Research Lab of Texas Instruments where he served as manager and principal architect of the Nanoelectronic Modeling (NEMO 1-D) program. At NASA Jet Propulsion Laboratory and Purdue University, Klimeck developed the Nanoelectronic Modeling Tool (NEMO 3-D) for multi-million atom simulations.

=== Patents ===
- U.S. 6490193: Forming and storing data in a memory cell
- U.S. 6667490: Method and system for generating a memory cell
- U.S. Patent 2012/0043,607: Tunneling Field-Effect Transistor with Low Leakage Current
- U.S. patent No. 9,858,365: “Physical modeling of electronic devices/systems”, Ganesh Hegde, Yaohua Tan, Tillmann Kubis, Michael Povolotskyi, Gerhard Klimeck (2017)
- U.S. patent 10680088, “Tunnel Effect Transistor Having Anisotropic Effective Mass Channel”, Hesameddin Ilatikhameneh, Tarek Ameen, Bozidar Novakovic, Rajib Rahman, Gerhard Klimeck, 2020/6/9
- U.S. patent US11093667B2, “Method and system for realistic and efficient simulation of light emitting diodes having multi-quantum-wells”, Gerhard Klimeck, Tillmann Kubis, Junzhe Geng. (2022)

=== Books ===
- Computational Electronics: Semiclassical and Quantum Device Modeling and Simulation (with Dragica Vasileska and S. M. Goodnick, 2010) CRC Press, ISBN 1420064835

=== Honors and awards ===
- Klimeck won 9 NASA Tech Briefs from 2004 to 2007
- 2008, Purdue Engineering Team Award "For his role in the creation of nanoHUB and its impact on the cyberinfrastructure for the national nanotechnology initiative leading a cultural change in research and education." shared with Mark S. Lundstrom and Michael McLennan
- 2011, Elected Fellow Institute of Physics “For the development, application, and dissemination of atomistic quantum simulation tools for nanoelectronic devices.”
- 2011, Gordon Bell Prize Competition Finalist
- 2011, Elected Fellow of the American Physical Society, citation: “For the development, application, and dissemination of atomistic quantum simulation tools for nanoelectronic devices.”
- 2012, Elected Fellow of the IEEE, citation: “for his contributions to atomistic quantum simulation tools for nanoelectronic devices”
- Klimeck and physicist Michelle Simmons of the University of New South Wales "devised a way to make a single-atom transistor", which ranked #29 top invention of 2013 by Discover Magazine
- 2019, Humboldt Foundation Research Prize. Professor Klimeck is a leading expert in the modeling of nanoelectronics devices. He is well known internationally for building and defining the state-of-the-art in atomistic modeling theory and simulation tools for today's most advanced transistor devices. He also guides the technical developments and strategies of the site nanoHUB.org, which annually serves over 1.5 million users worldwide with online simulations, tutorials, and seminars. In Germany, he continues his research on atomic-scale semiconductor devices to explore new concepts in hybrid nanostructures.
- 2020, R&D 100 award winner in Software and Services category. “Making simulation and data pervasive”, “nanoHUB: Democratizing Learning and Research”. Award winners: Gerhard Klimeck, Alejandro Strachan, Lynn Zentner, Michael Zentner.
- 2020, Elected Fellow of American Association for the Advancement of Science (AAAS), ”For the quantum mechanical modeling theory and simulation tools to design today's nanotransistors and for leadership of the global nanotechnology community as Director of nanoHUB.”

== Selected works ==
- Learning and research in the cloud
- A single-atom transistor
- Ohm's Law Survives to the Atomic Scale
- nanoHUB.org: Advancing Education and Research in Nanotechnology
- Development of a Nanoelectronic 3-D (NEMO 3-D) Simulator for Multimillion Atom Simulations and Its Application to Alloyed Quantum Dots (INVITED)
- Quantum Device Simulation with a Generalized Tunneling Formula
- Conductance Spectroscopy in Coupled Quantum Dots
