= TZ Limited =

- Type: Public
- Traded as: ASX: TZL
- Industry: Engineering; Design; Investment
- Founded: 1986
- Headquarters: Chicago, United States
- Key people: Mark Bouris, chairman; Dickory Rudduck (Deceased), Founder; Kenneth Ting, company secretary John Wilson, CEO; Greg Wuest - General Manager
- Revenue: US $15.86 million (2007)
- Net income: US $10.80 million (2007)
- Website: http://www.tzlimited.com

TZ Ltd. known previously by various other names, is a company that develops and licenses proprietary technologies.

== History ==
Pharmol Pacific Pty Ltd. was founded in 1986 in New Zealand. Following numerous name changes, the company became CED Australasia in 2002. In 2004, CED Australasia acquired Telezygology, Inc., a United States fastener company that had formed in 1998. Soon after, the company renamed itself to TZ Ltd. Around 2005, the company moved its headquarters from Sydney, Australia to Chicago, United States, but it remains registered on the Australian Securities Exchange, under the symbol TZL.

In 2009, the former board resigned under pressure from shareholders, and were replaced by a board headed by Australian Wizard Home Loans founder and celebrity Mark Bouris.

In mid-2013, the founder Dickory Rudduck died from cancer.

== Products ==
One of TZ Ltd.'s main products is intelligent fastening, a technology that allows fasteners to be controlled remotely. Dickory Rudduck, an Australian architect and inventor, invented the intelligent fastening technology. This was greatly enhanced by his ability to self produce. The technology was a 2005 Product of the Year finalist for NASA Tech Briefs magazine.
