= I Crush Bozo =

Studio album by Happy Flowers
- Released: 1988
- Recorded: March 8, 1987 (except tracks 2, 3, 6, 10 and 14; recorded August 10, 1987)
- Studio: Inner Ear Studios
- Genre: Noise, Alternative Rock
- Label: Homestead
- Producer: Happy Flowers, Don Zientara, Eli Janney

Happy Flowers chronology
| My Skin Covers My Body (1987) | I Crush Bozo (1988) | Oof (1989) |

Professional ratings
Review scores
| Source | Rating |
|---|---|
| AllMusic | 4/5 stars |

I Crush Bozo is an album by the band Happy Flowers, released in 1988.

== Track listing ==
1. "Get Me off the Broiler Pan" - 2:54
2. "I'm the Stupid One" - 2:29
3. "More Mittens" - 1:22
4. "Old Relatives" - 2:22
5. "Get Paul's Head" - 1:34
6. "Why Don't I Bleed" - 2:09
7. "Fever Dream" - 2:44
8. "They Cleaned My Cut Out With a Wire Brush" - 3:55
9. "I've Got the Picnic Disease" - 3:45
10. "Jellyfish Head" - 2:22
11. "There's a Worm in My Hand" - 2:31
12. "Know" - 0:49
13. "Toenail Fear" - 2:22
14. "Mrs. Butcher" - 2:51
15. "My Frisbee Went Under a Lawnmower" - 2:47
16. "I Saw My Picture on a Milk Carton" - 2:30

== Personnel ==
- John Beers ("Horribly Charred Infant") - vocals, guitars, drums, piano on track 13
- Charlie Kramer ("Mr. Anus") - guitar, bass, drums, vocals, Casio keyboards on track 14
