= R. Edwin Garcia =

Professor of Materials Engineering

R. Edwin Garcia is a Professor of Materials Engineering at Purdue University. Garcia's research group focuses on the design of materials and devices through the development of a fundamental understanding of the solid state physics of the individual phases, their short and long range interactions, and its associated microstructural evolution.

== Education ==
- B.S., 1996, National University of Mexico, physics
- M.S., 2000, Massachusetts Institute of Technology, materials science and engineering
- PhD., 2003, Massachusetts Institute of Technology, materials science and engineering with a minor in applied mathematics

== Research interests ==
Materials are selected to meet the requirements of specific technological applications. Their response depends on the underlying thermodynamic and kinetic properties as well as the inherent microstructural features. In particular, microstructure depends on the applied processing techniques and starting materials, and in many cases macroscopic properties are linked to microstructure. Thus, understanding the effect of microstructure on the time evolution, response, and reliability of material properties is important. Garcia is interested in the application of theoretical and computational materials science to understand the relations between material properties and microstructure. Garcia's research places special emphasis on establishing analytical descriptions of complex processes and on the development of numerical algorithms and codes when microstructural simulation is required. Garcia is also interested in developing the means to optimize materials through fundamental understanding and graphical representation of the relations between processing, structure, and properties.

== Professional impact ==
Users of Simulation Tools Authored by R. Edwin Garcia

Garcia is a contributor on nanoHUB.org, serving over 1,600 users as of April 2013. In addition, Garcia is involved with the nanoHUB-U Initiative to provide free online courses in nanotechnology, pioneered by Mark Lundstrom

== Software ==
=== OOF: Finite Element Analysis of Microstructures ===
Garcia is a principal developer of OOF: Finite Element Analysis of Microstructures, which is public domain software designed to enable investigation of the properties of microstructures. It was developed at the US National Institute of Standards and Technology (NIST).

=== VKML: The Virtual Kinetics of Materials Laboratory ===
The Virtual Kinetics of Materials Laboratory is a tool hosted by nanoHUB that allows users to simulate microstructural evolution models by using FiPy. VKML was developed by Alexander Bartol and R. Edwin Garcia with sponsorship from the National Science Foundation.

=== Gibbs ===
Developed by Thomas Cool, R. Edwin Garcia and Alex Bartol, Gibbs is a tool hosted by nanoHUB that enables rapid prototyping, validation, and comparison of thermodynamic models to describe the equilibrium between multiple phases for binary systems.

== Books ==
"Microstructural Modeling of Multifunctional Material Properties: The OOF Project." R. Edwin García, Andrew C.E. Reid, Stephen A. Langer, and W. Craig Carter. Invited chapter in "Continuum Scale Simulation of Engineering Materials." Dierk Raabe, Franz Roters, Frédéric Barlat, Long-Qing Chen (eds.), Wiley-VCH, Weinheim. ISBN 3-527-30760-5.
