= W. Craig Carter =

American materials scientist, engineer and academic

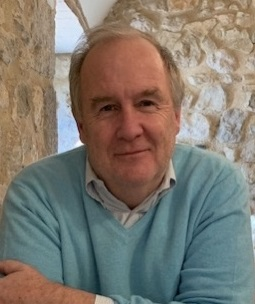
- Born: June 3, 1961 (age 65); California
- Occupations: Engineer and researcher
- Title: Toyota Professor of Materials Science
- Awards: Robert L. Coble and Ross Coffin Purdy Awards, American Ceramic Society, Wolfram Innovator of the Year, Wolfram Research; Outstanding Educator Award, American Ceramic Society

Academic background
- Education: B.S., Materials Science and Engineering; M.S., Materials Science and Engineering; Ph.D., Materials Science and Engineering
- Alma mater: Univ. of California, Berkeley
- Thesis: Capillary-Induced microstructural development in porous materials (1989)

Academic work
- Institutions: Massachusetts Institute of Technology, National Institutes of Standards and Technology, Ecole Polytechnique Federale de Lausanne, Rockwell International Science Center

W. Craig Carter is an American materials scientist, a Toyota Professor of Materials Science and Engineering at Massachusetts Institute of Technology. He is also a co-founder of the 24M Technologies Company.

He is a specialist in the fields of meso-scale modelling of materials properties and processing. His research is focused on thermodynamics and kinetics of interfaces, simulations of microstructural evolution, and predictions of fracture and reliability in materials. He has also worked on battery materials.

He is a MacVicar Fellow and has received the MIT School of Engineering Bose Teaching Award. He has also been a recipient of Wolfram Innovator Award. He is a fellow of American Ceramic Society.

== Education ==
Carter studied material science and engineering and received his bachelor's, Masters and Doctoral degree from University of California, Berkeley in 1983, 1987, and 1989, respectively. He completed his post-doctoral studies in material science from NIST in 1991.

== Academic career ==
Carter worked briefly at Rockwell International Science Center before working as a Research Scientist at NIST from 1992 till 1998. He then joined Massachusetts Institute of Technology as an associate professor of Material Science and Engineering and was promoted to Professor in 2003. In 2010, Carter co-founded 24M Technologies Company.

== Research ==
=== Meso-scale modelling of materials properties and processing ===
Carter has conducted research on theory and meso-scale modelling of materials properties and processing. He focused on thermodynamics and kinetics of interfaces and studied mathematical developments regarding surface evolution and equilibration problems related to crystalline surface energy anisotropy.

He also studied simulations of microstructural evolution and discussed two-dimensional calculations of anisotropic growth and coarsening for simulating the development microstructure in materials. He studied the applications of digital image model and modified it to include elastic strain energy at solid-fluid interfaces. He co-authored a public domain software to model microstructural properties from experimental images.

=== The Kobayashi-Warren-Carter Model ===
Along with James A Warren and Ryo Kobayashi, Carter developed a phase-field model that incorporates crystallographic orientation as a microstructural parameter. The model has become known as the KWC model.

=== Complexions: Interface Structures and Transitions ===
In the mid-2000s with Rowland Cannon and Ming Tang, he introduced a new concept of interface Complexion as a descriptor for the structure and local chemistry of a grain boundary.

Complexion transitions occur when a grain boundary's chemistry and/or structure change at a critical temperature, pressure, or a chemical potential. It was necessary to construct a new foundation for such transitions to distinguish them from phase transitions, because a grain boundary cannot be considered a phase as defined by Gibbs. and complexion transitions are distinct from phase transitions and are not constrained by the phase rule.

The original idea combined Cahn's Critical Wetting Theory and the KWC model

=== Science of battery materials ===
In his later research, Carter directed his focus to the science of battery materials and the electro-chemo-mechanics of phase transitions and fracture of battery electrodes. He studied olivine compounds as enablers of positive electrode materials for high-power in lithium rechargeable batteries and discussed the miscibility gap in undoped Li1-xFePO4. He observed the elimination of the gap below a critical point.

He co-developed a flow battery that utilized co-suspensions of solid state electrode and electronically conductive particulates. His research demonstrated the fast rate capability and greater cycling stability in NaTi2(PO4)3/Na0.44MnO2 cells.

== Other professional activities ==
Carter has also designed software to create forms and textures. He collaborated with Neri Oxman of the MIT Media Lab on projects incorporating material science, mythology and natural designs. Data and algorithms created for the Oxman work are publicly available. Carter is the designer of ONE.MIT which is a mosaic having more than 270,000 names from the MIT community etched on a 6-inch-diameter silicon wafer.

== Awards and honors ==
- 1990 – Ross Coffin Purdy Award, American Ceramic Society
- 1996 – Robert Coble Young Scientist Award, American Ceramic Society
- 1999 – Fellow, American Ceramic Society
- 1999 – Technology of the Year, IndustryWeek Magazine
- 2005 – R.M. Fulrath Award, American Ceramic Society
- 2008 – Bose Award for Excellence in Teaching, MIT
- 2008 – MacVicar Distinguished Teaching Fellow, MIT
- 2012 – Wolfram Innovator of the Year, Wolfram Research
- 2017 – Outstanding Educator Award, American Ceramic Society

== Bibliography ==
=== Books ===
- Selected Works of John W. Cahn (1998) ISBN 9781118788202
- Kinetics of Materials (2005) ISBN 9780471246893

=== Selected articles ===
- Cahn, J. W., Carter, W. C. (1996). Crystal shapes and phase equilibria: A common mathematical basis. Metallurgical and Materials Transactions a-Physical Metallurgy and Materials Science 27, 1431.
- Kobayashi, R., Warren, J. A., & Carter, W. C. (2000). A continuum model of grain boundaries. Physica D: Nonlinear Phenomena, 140(1-2), 141–150.
- Kobayashi, R. Warren, J. A., Carter, W. C. (2000). A continuum model of grain boundaries. Physica D 140, 141.
- Tang, M., Carter, W. C., Cannon, R. M. (2006). Grain boundary transitions in binary alloys. Physical Review Letters, 97.
- Meethong, N., Huang, H. Y. S., Carter, W. C., & Chiang, Y. M. (2007). Size-dependent lithium miscibility gap in nanoscale Li1− x FePO4. Electrochemical and Solid State Letters, 10(5), A134.
- Dillon, S. J., Tang, M., Carter, W. C., & Harmer, M. P. (2007). Complexion: a new concept for kinetic engineering in materials science. Acta Materialia, 55(18), 6208–6218.
- Meethong, N., Huang, H. Y., Speakman, S. A., Carter, W. C., & Chiang, Y. M. (2007). Strain accommodation during phase transformations in olivine‐based cathodes as a materials selection criterion for high‐power rechargeable batteries. Advanced Functional Materials, 17(7), 1115–1123.
- Woodford, W. H., Chiang, Y. M., Carter, W. C. (2010). "Electrochemical Shock" of Intercalation Electrodes: A Fracture Mechanics Analysis. Journal of the Electrochemical Society, 157, A1052.
- Duduta, M., Ho, B., Wood, V. C., Limthongkul, P., Brunini, V. E., Carter, W. C., & Chiang, Y. M. (2011). Semi‐Solid lithium rechargeable flow battery. Advanced Energy Materials, 1(4), 511–516.
