= Oof (album) =

Studio album by Happy Flowers
- Released: 1989
- Genres: Punk rock, indie rock
- Length: 39:08
- Label: Homestead

Happy Flowers chronology
I Crush Bozo (1988)	Oof (1989)	Lasterday I Was Been Bad (1990)

Oof is an album by the punk rock band Happy Flowers. It was released in 1989.

== Track listing ==
1. "Stop Touching My Food"
2. "Unhappy Meal"
3. "Pickin' Scabs"
4. "There's a Soft Spot on the Baby's Head"
5. "Finger in My Crackerjacks"
6. "Ain't Got Nothin'"
7. "I Said I Wanna Watch Cartoons"
8. "My Arm Won't Wake Up"
9. "My Evil Twin"
10. "I'm Gonna Have an Accident"
11. "Let's Eat the Baby (Like My Gerbils Did)"
12. "BB Gun"
13. "Let Me Out"
14. "I Don't Wanna Go to School"
15. "Mrs. Lennon" (Yoko Ono)

== Personnel ==
- John Beers ("Mr. Horribly Charred Infant") — vocals
- Charlie Kramer ("Mr. Anus") — guitar
