= Interface (journal) =

- Discipline: Electrochemistry, Solid-state chemistry
- Language: English
- Edited by: Vijay Ramani, Petr Vanysek, Annie Goedkoop

Publication details
- History: 1992-present
- Publisher: Electrochemical Society
- Frequency: Quarterly
- Open access: Yes

Standard abbreviations
- ISO 4: Interface

Indexing
- CODEN: ELSIE3
- ISSN: 1064-8208 (print); 1944-8783 (web)
- LCCN: 94660502
- OCLC no.: 780666054

Links
- Journal homepage; Online access; Online archive

Interface (also known as The Electrochemical Society Interface) is a quarterly open access scientific journal published by the Electrochemical Society covering developments in electrochemistry and solid-state chemistry, as well as news and information about and for members of the society.

== History ==
The journal was established in 1992, because the Journal of the Electrochemical Society became a purely technical publication. The new publication was intended to provide members with information on matters affecting their society interests. The first issue was published in the Winter of 1992, with a cover that featured Nobel Laureate Rudolph Marcus, who learned of his winning the prize while at the ECS fall meeting in Toronto.

== Indexing and abstracting ==
The journal is indexed and abstracted in the following bibliographic databases:

- Academic Search Premier
- Aerospace Database
- Business Source Elite
- Business Source Premier
- Chemical Abstracts Core
- Civil Engineering Abstracts
- Communication Abstracts
- Compendex
- Emerging Sources Citation Index
- INSPEC
- Metadex
- Scopus
