= Happy Flowers =

American musical group

- Origin: Charlottesville, Virginia
- Genres: Punk rock, Noise rock, Noise
- Years active: 1983-1992; 2000; 2004; 2006
- Labels: Homestead, Touch and Go Records
- Members: Mr. Anus (Charlie Kramer); Mr. Horribly Charred Infant (John Beers)

Happy Flowers was an American musical group, formed in Charlottesville, Virginia, in 1983 by two members of the Landlords, John Beers ("Mr. Horribly Charred Infant", drums, vocals) and Charlie Kramer ("Mr. Anus", guitar, vocals), both students at the University of Virginia. This duo combines improvisational noise punk guitar and drums with lyrics often written in the first person from the perspective of a child, with childlike intonation and grammar. Their humorous songs are mainly about freak childhood accidents and common childhood gripes.

== History ==
The Landlords were an early hardcore punk band from Charlottesville, Virginia, United States. The band, consisting of four students from the University of Virginia, was formed at around October 1983. A month after the Landlords formed, the band began to break off into a number of other bands which included the Happy Flowers When Beers and Kramer concentrated on their Happy Flowers work, Landlords bassist Eddie Jetlag continued his association with them by writing sleevenotes for their releases. The Landlords continued for a few years after Happy Flowers started.

Happy Flowers' first song, "Mom, I Gave the Cat Some Acid", was released during the summer of 1984 as a part of the compilation album called Brain of Stone. This was followed the same year by the band's first two EPs. The band received a wider audience with the albums My Skin Covers My Body (1987) and I Crush Bozo (1988), both released by Homestead Records. The 1990 album Lasterday I Was Been Bad featured drummer Scott Pickering on half of the tracks. In March 2000, the band went on a four-date tour, the band's first tour in nearly ten years. In February 2004, the band reunited in Charlottesville, Virginia for a 20th anniversary performance, a limited-edition DVD from which is available from Lost Frog Productions. In March 2006, the band reunited again and played at the South by Southwest music festival in Austin, Texas.

== Line-up ==
- Mr. Horribly Charred Infant (vocals, instruments, non-instruments)
- Mr. Anus (vocals, instruments, non-instruments)

== Discography ==
=== Landlords discography ===
- It's a Teenage House Party With The Landlords LP (1984), Catch Trout
- Our Favorite Songs! EP (1987), Catch Trout
- Fitzgerald's Paris LP (2016), Feel It Records

=== Happy Flowers albums ===
- My Skin Covers My Body (1987), Homestead
- I Crush Bozo (1988), Homestead
- Oof (1989), Homestead
- Lasterday I Was Been Bad (1990), Homestead

=== Compilations ===
- Gods Favorite Dog (1986), Touch and Go
- Making the Bunny Pay (1987), Catch Trout - compilation of first two EPs
- Too Many Bunnies, (Not Enough Mittens) (1989), Homestead
- Flowers on 45: The Homestead Singles (1992), Homestead

=== Happy Flowers singles and EPs ===
- Songs for Children 7-inch EP (1984), Catch Trout
- Now We Are Six 7-inch EP (1986), Catch Trout
- "They Cleaned My Cut Out With a Wire Brush" (1988), Homestead
- "BB Gun" (1989), Homestead
- "Call Me Pudge" (1990), Homestead
- The Peel Sessions 7-inch EP (1991), Homestead

== Videography ==
- 20th Anniversary Show (DVD, 2006)
