= NanoHUB =

nanoHUB.org
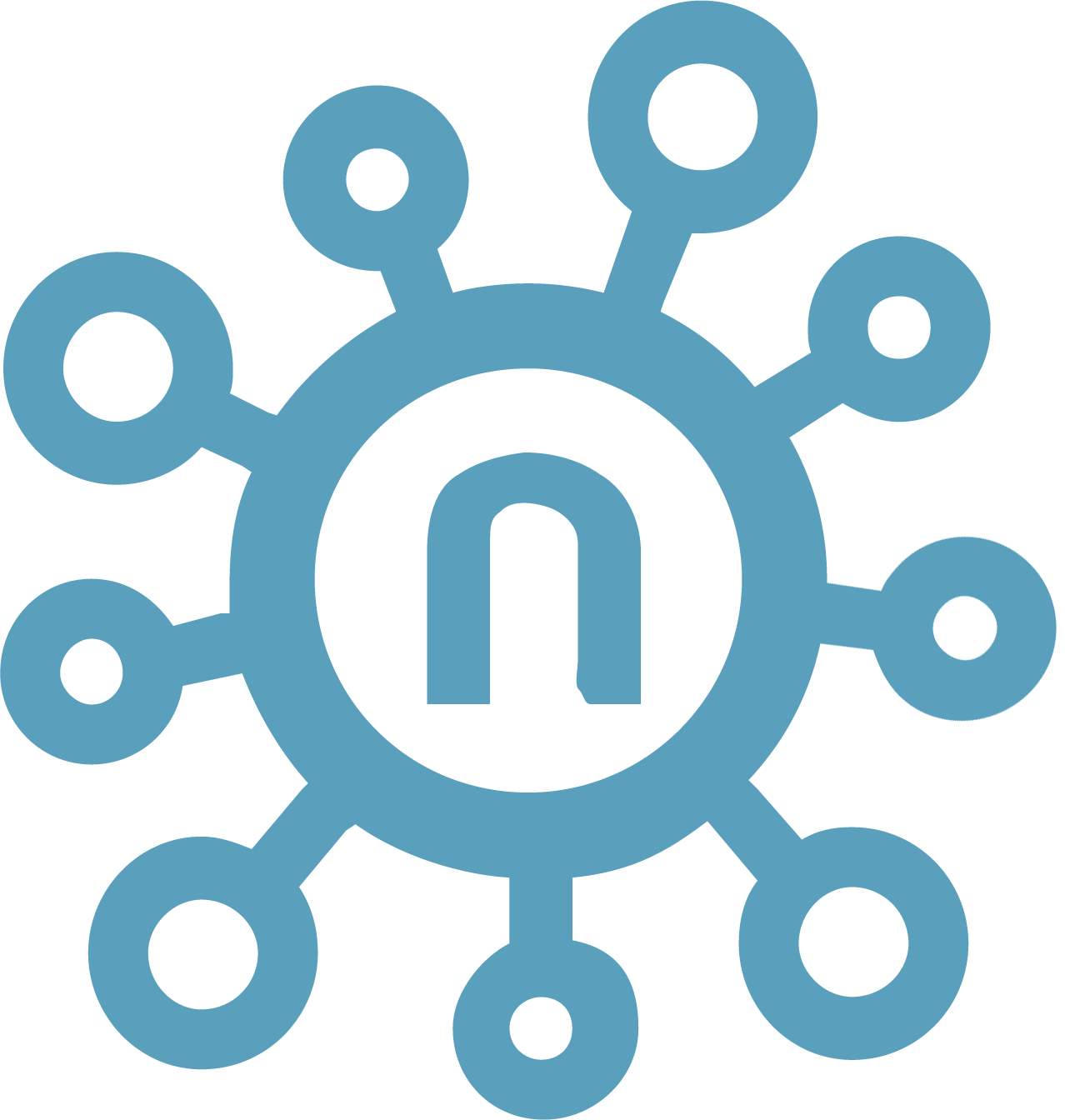
- The nanoHUB.org logo
- Website type: Scientific research support
- Website: www.nanohub.org
- Commercial: No
- Launched: 2002

nanoHUB.org is a science and engineering gateway comprising community-contributed resources and geared toward education, professional networking, and interactive simulation tools for nanotechnology. Funded by the United States National Science Foundation (NSF), it is a product of the Network for Computational Nanotechnology (NCN). NCN supports research efforts in nanoelectronics; nanomaterials; nanoelectromechanical systems (NEMS); nanofluidics; nanomedicine, nanobiology; and nanophotonics.

== History ==
The Network for Computational Nanotechnology was established in 2002 to create a resource for nanoscience and nanotechnology via online services for research, education, and professional collaboration. Initially a multi-university initiative of eight member institutions including Purdue University, the University of California at Berkeley, the University of Illinois at Urbana-Champaign, Massachusetts Institute of Technology, the Molecular Foundry at Lawrence Berkeley National Laboratory, Norfolk State University, Northwestern University, and the University of Texas at El Paso, NCN now operates entirely at Purdue.

The US National Science Foundation (NSF) provided grants of approximately $14 million from 2002 through 2010, with principal investigator Mark S. Lundstrom. Continuing US NSF grants have been awarded since 2007 with principal investigator Gerhard Klimeck and co-principal investigator Alejandro Strachan, with total funding of over $20 million.

== Resources ==
The Web portal of NCN is nanoHUB.org and is an instance of a HUBzero hub. It offers simulation tools, course materials, lectures, seminars, tutorials, user groups, and online meetings. Interactive simulation tools are accessible from web browsers and run via a distributed computing network at Purdue University, as well as the TeraGrid and Open Science Grid. These resources are provided by hundreds of member contributors in the nanoscience community.

Main resource types:

- Interactive simulation tools for nanotechnology and related fields
- Course curricula for educators
- News and events for nanotechnology
- Lectures, podcasts and learning materials in multiple formats
- Online seminars
- Online workshops
- User groups
- Online group meeting rooms
- Virtual Linux workspaces that facilitate tool development within an in-browser Linux machine

== Simulation tools ==
The nanoHUB provides in-browser simulation tools geared toward nanotechnology, electrical engineering, materials science, chemistry, and semiconductor education. nanoHUB simulations are available to users as both stand-alone tools and part of structured teaching and learning curricula comprising numerous tools. Users can develop and contribute their own tools for live deployment.

Examples of tools include:

SCHRED
calculates envelope wavefunctions and the corresponding bound-state energies in a typical Metal-Oxide-Semiconductor (MOS) or Semiconductor-Oxide-Semiconductor (SOS) structure and a typical SOI structure by solving self-consistently the one-dimensional (1D) Poisson equation and the 1D Schrödinger equation.

Quantum Dot Lab
computes the eigenstates of a particle in a box of various shapes including domes and pyramids.

Bulk Monte Carlo Tool
calculates the bulk values of the electron drift velocity, electron average energy and electron mobility for electric fields applied in arbitrary crystallographic direction in both column 4 (Si and Ge) and III-V (GaAs, SiC and GaN) materials.

Crystal Viewer
helps in visualizing various types of Bravais lattices, planes and Miller indices needed for many material, electronics and chemistry courses. Also large bulk systems for different materials (Silicon, InAs, GaAs, diamond, graphene, Buckyball) can be viewed using this tool.

Band Structure Lab
computes and visualizes the band structures of bulk semiconductors, thin films, and nanowires for various materials, growth orientations, and strain conditions. Physical parameters such as the bandgap and effective mass can also be obtained from the computed band structures.

nano-Materials Simulation Toolkit
uses molecular dynamics to simulate materials at the atomic scale.

DFT calculations with Quantum ESPRESSO
uses density functional theory to simulate the electronic structure of materials.

== Infrastructure ==
=== Rappture Toolkit ===
The Rappture (Rapid APPlication infrastrucTURE) toolkit provides the basic infrastructure for the development of a large class of scientific applications, allowing scientists to focus on their core algorithm. It does so in a language-neutral fashion, so one may access Rappture in a variety of programming environments, including C/C++, Fortran and Python. To use Rappture, a developer describes all of the inputs and outputs for the simulator, and Rappture generates a Graphical User Interface (GUI) for the tool automatically.

=== Jupyter notebooks ===
To complement the existing Rappture GUI tools within nanoHUB, the more recent browser based Jupyter notebooks are also available on nanoHUB, since 2017. Jupyter in nanoHUB offer new possibilities using the existing scientific software, and most notably all Rappture tools, within nanoHUB with the notebooks of interspersed code (e.g. Python, text, and multimedia.

=== Workspaces ===
A workspace is an in-browser Linux desktop that provides access to NCN's Rappture toolkit, along with computational resources available on the NCN, Open Science Grid, and TeraGrid networks. One can use these resources to conduct research, or as a development area for new simulation tools. One may upload code, compile it, test it, and debug it. Once code is tested and working properly in a workspace, it can be deployed as a live tool on nanoHUB.

A user can use normal Linux tools to transfer data into and out of a workspace. For example, sftp yourlogin@sftp.nanohub.org will establish a connection with a nanoHUB file share. Users can also use built-in WebDAV support on Windows, Macintosh, and Linux operating systems to access their nanoHUB files on a local desktop.

=== Middleware ===
The web server uses a daemon to dynamically relay incoming VNC connections to the execution host on which an application session is running. Instead of using the port router to set up a separate channel by which a file import or export operation is conducted, it uses VNC to trigger an action on the browser which relays a file transfer through the main nanoHUB web server. The primary advantage of consolidating these capabilities into the web server is that it limits the entry point to the nanoHUB to one address: www.nanohub.org. This simplifies the security model as well as reduces on the number of independent security certificates to manage.

One disadvantage of consolidating most communication through the web server is the lack of scalability when too much data is transferred by individual users. In order to avoid a network traffic jam, the web server can be replicated and clustered into one name by means of DNS round-robin selection.

The backend execution hosts that support Maxwell can operate with conventional Unix systems, Xen virtual machines, and a form of virtualization based on OpenVZ. For each system, a VNC server is pre-started for every session. When OpenVZ is used, that VNC server is started inside of a virtual container. Processes running in that container cannot see other processes on the physical system, see the CPU load imposed by other users, dominate the resources of the physical machine, or make outbound network connections. By selectively overriding the restrictions imposed by OpenVZ, it is possible to synthesize a fully private environment for each application session that the user can use remotely.

== Usage ==
The majority of users come from academic institutions using nanoHUB as part of their research and educational activities. Users also come from national labs and private industry. As a scientific resource, nanoHUB was cited hundreds of times in the scientific literature, peaking in 2009. Approximately sixty percent of the citations stem from authors not affiliated with the NCN. More than 200 of the citations refer to nanotechnology research, with more than 150 of them citing concrete resource usage. Twenty citations elaborate on nanoHUB use in education and more than 30 refer to nanoHUB as an example of national cyberinfrastructure.

== nanoHUB-U ==
The nanoHUB-U online course initiative was developed to enable students to study a subject in a five-week framework roughly equivalent to a 1-credit class. No credit is given – quizzes and exams are simple and are intended to be aids to learning rather than rigorous tests for acquired skills. In the spirit of a research university, nanoHUB-U courses aim to bring new advances and understanding from research into the curriculum; in addition, simulation (often from nanoHUB) are heavily included in the courses. Every effort is made to present courses in a way that is accessible to beginning graduate students with a variety of different backgrounds with a minimum number of prerequisites. The ideal nanoHUB-U course is accessible to any students with an undergraduate degree in engineering or the physical sciences. Courses include nanoelectronics, nanoscale materials, and nanoscale characterization. nanoHUB-U courses are now a part of edX.

== See also ==
- Materials informatics
- Integrated computational materials engineering
- Multiscale modeling
