= Indiana Theory Review =

Academic journal

- Discipline: Music theory
- Language: English

Publication details
- History: 1977–present

Standard abbreviations
- ISO 4: Indiana Theory Rev.

Indexing
- ISSN: 0271-8022

Links
- Journal homepage

The Indiana Theory Review (ISSN 0271-8022) is a peer-reviewed academic journal specializing in music theory and analysis. It began publication in 1977, under the auspices of graduate students in music theory at the Jacobs School of Music, making it the second of the graduate-student produced theory journals to debut in the United States (after In Theory Only). Originally edited and managed wholly by graduate students, the journal more recently formed an editorial board of senior scholars in the field. The journal has published continuously since its inception and is currently (2018) in volume 34. The journal is published on the Public Knowledge Project's Open Journal Systems platform and all issues before the current one are available on JSTOR.
