= In Theory Only =

Academic journal

- Discipline: Music theory and analysis
- Language: English

Publication details
- History: 1975-present

Standard abbreviations
- ISO 4: In Theory Only

Links
- Archive

In Theory Only (ISSN 0360-4365) was a peer-reviewed academic journal specializing in music theory and analysis. It began publication in 1975, under the auspices of graduate students in music theory at the University of Michigan School of Music, Theatre & Dance, making it the first of the graduate-student produced theory journals to debut in the U.S. (followed two years later by Indiana Theory Review). The journal initially employed the subtitle "Newsletter of the Michigan Music Theory Society" (later dropped). The journal ceased regular publication in 1997, but had one final issue published in 2007.
