= Journal of the Electrochemical Society =

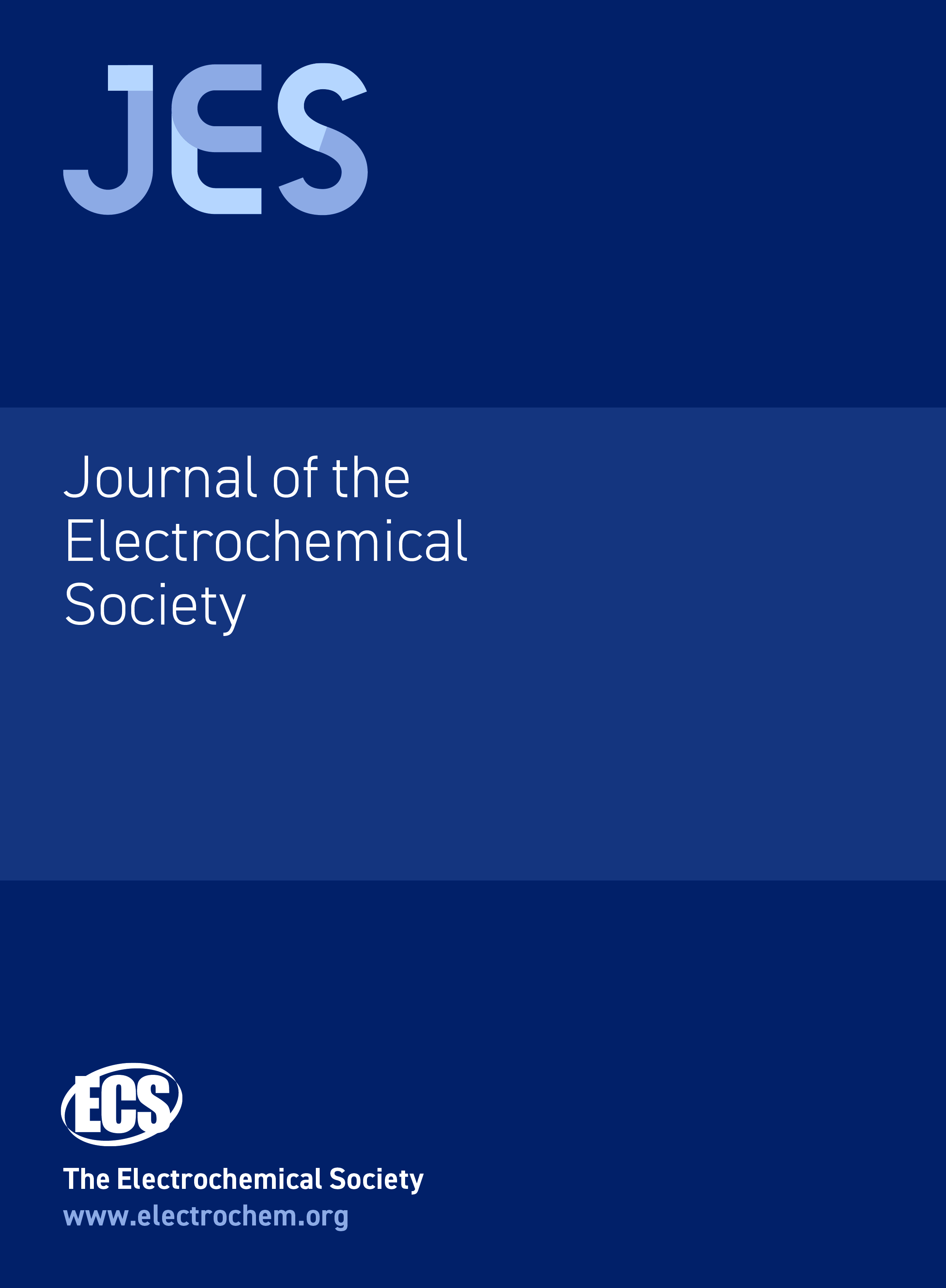
- Discipline: Electrochemistry
- Language: English
- Edited by: Rober Savinell

Publication details
- Former name(s): Transactions of the American Electrochemical Society; Transactions of the Electrochemical Society
- History: 1902–present
- Publisher: Electrochemical Society (United States of America)
- Frequency: Monthly
- Impact factor: 3.1 (2023)

Standard abbreviations
- ISO 4: J. Electrochem. Soc.

Indexing
- CODEN: JESOAN
- ISSN: 0013-4651 (print); 1945-7111 (web)
- LCCN: 48010635
- OCLC no.: 1029376

Links
- Journal homepage; Digital Library access; Focus Issues

The Journal of the Electrochemical Society is a monthly peer-reviewed scientific journal covering the field of electrochemical science and technology. It is published by the Electrochemical Society. According to the Journal Citation Reports, the journal has a 2023 impact factor of 3.1.

== History ==
The journal was established in 1902 as Transactions of the American Electrochemical Society. The first 58 volumes were published under this title. In 1931, the journal was renamed Transactions of the Electrochemical Society, until volume 96 published in 1949.

The transition from Transactions to the Journal occurred over two years 1948 (Vol. 93-94) and 1949 (Vol. 95-96). During this period, both the Transactions and the Journal published the same articles, with the same volume numbering and the same pagination. However, the Journal also incorporated the Bulletin of the Electrochemical Society in it, which the Transactions lacked. The Transactions were then discontinued.

Although the journal was originally meant to include only papers presented at society meetings, in 1952 a mix of unsolicited, as well as meeting papers, began to be published. Beginning in 1967, the journal was divided into 3 sections: Electrochemical Science and Technology, Solid-State Science and Technology, and Reviews and News. The Reviews and News section was forked off as Interface in 1992, and the Solid-State Science and Technology section became the ECS Journal of Solid State Science and Technology in 2012.
