= NASA Tech Briefs =

US monthly magazine

The National Aeronautics and Space Administration is required by its charter to report to industry any new, commercially significant technologies developed in the course of their R&D. Since the early 1960s, this has been accomplished primarily through the publication of NASA Tech Briefs.

NASA Tech Briefs were first published about 1963 by the Technology Utilization Office at NASA HQ (Washington, D.C.) as single-page documents. Over the years, hundreds of such documents were published and disseminated covering many areas of science and industry. The material for these documents was collected by TU offices in each of the NASA field centers, as well as from all of their contractors. Most work done under NASA contract was presumed to be the property of NASA and was freely disseminated to industry and the public. Compilations of these became available in the 1970s. Since then, it has been a joint publishing venture of NASA and Tech Briefs Media Group, a unit of SAE International, since 1985. It is headquartered in New York City and the publisher is Joe Pramberger.

The monthly magazine features reports of innovations developed by NASA and its industry partners/contractors. NASA Tech Briefs also contains articles on NASA spinoffs, NASA tech transfer resources, and application stories. Regular columns describe new patents, industry products, software, and literature.

The associated commercial ad-supported web site is privately owned and is not an official Web site of the National Aeronautics and Space Administration, nor is it sponsored by NASA.
