= Mark S. Lundstrom =

American professor of electrical engineering

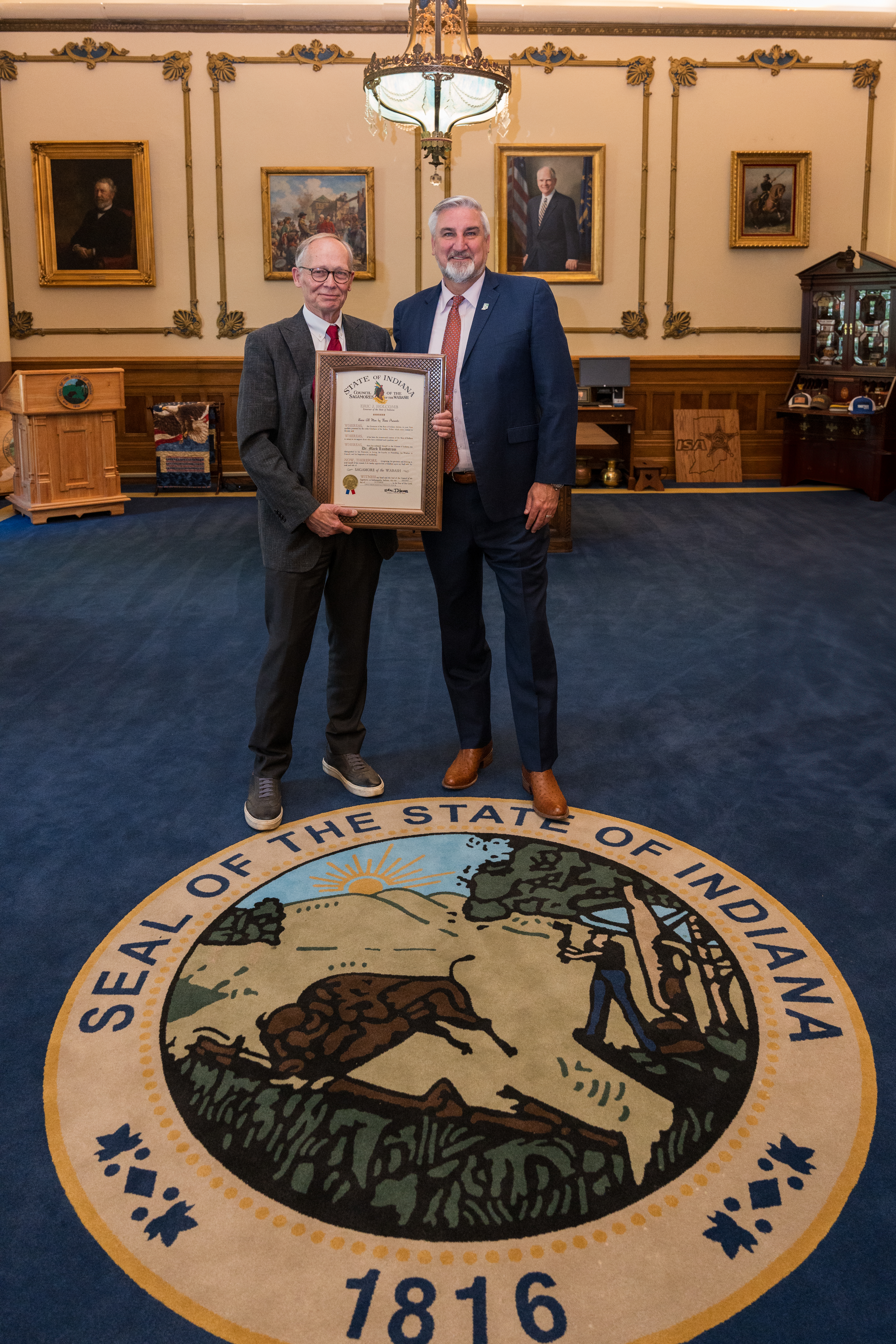
- Lundstrom in 2024
- Born: Alexandria, Minnesota, U.S.
- Known for: Lundstrom model of the nanotransistor
- Scientific career
- Fields: Electronic devices and Materials
- Workplaces: Purdue University
- Doctoral advisor: R. J. Schwartz

Mark S. Lundstrom is an American electrical engineering researcher, educator, and author. He is known for contributions to the theory, modeling, and understanding of semiconductor devices, especially nanoscale transistors, and as the creator of the nanoHUB, a major online resource for nanotechnology. Lundstrom is Don and Carol Scifres Distinguished Professor of Electrical and Computer Engineering and in 2020 served as Acting Dean of the College of Engineering at Purdue University, in West Lafayette, Indiana.

== Early life and education ==
Lundstrom was born and grew up in Alexandria, Minnesota and graduated from high school in 1969. He received his BEE from the University of Minnesota in 1973. As an undergraduate student, he was introduced to research by working in the laboratory of Aldert van der Ziel. Lundstrom received an MSEE degree from the University of Minnesota in 1974 for research on surface acoustic wave devices. He was a Member of the Technical Staff at Hewlett Packard Corporation in Colorado where he worked on integrated circuit process development. Lundstrom received his Ph.D. in Electrical Engineering from Purdue University in 1980 for research on silicon solar cells. His thesis advisor was Richard J. Schwartz, inventor of the Interdigitated Back Contact (IBC) solar cell. In 1980, Lundstrom joined Purdue University.

== Career ==
Lundstrom’s research focuses on understanding current flow in electronic devices. He has conducted studies on the theory, modeling, and numerical simulation of charge carrier transport in semiconductor devices – especially devices with dimensions at the nanoscale. He is the author of Fundamentals of Carrier Transport (Addison-Wesley, 1990), the second edition of which (Cambridge Univ. Press, 2000) has become a standard reference on charge carrier transport in semiconductors.

Lundstrom’s most important contribution is a conceptual model for nanoscale transistors backed up with rigorous numerical simulations, and elaborated in his books Fundamentals of Nanotransistors (World Scientific, 2017) and Nanoscale Transistors - Device Physics, Modeling and Simulation (Springer, 2006) as well as numerous journal articles. He has also contributed to the understanding, modeling and design of other semiconductor devices. His early work focused on heterostructure devices, namely solar cells and bipolar transistors. In 1994, with his student Greg Lush, he proposed the use of photon recycling to increase the efficiency of GaAs solar cells—a concept that later produced record efficiencies in single junction solar cells. His recent work extends his approach to electronic transport to thermal transport by phonons and coupled electro-thermal transport, effects that are important in the design and analysis of thermoelectric devices.

In 1995 with his colleagues Nirav Kapadia and Jose A.B. Fortes, Lundstrom created PUNCH – the Purdue University Network Computing Hub, which provided access to scientific simulations through a web browser, and was an early example of cloud computing. As founding director of the National Science Foundation-funded Network for Computational Nanotechnology, Lundstrom created the nanoHUB in 2000. The nanoHUB has grown into a major online resource for nanoelectronics, offering researchers, educators and students online access to sophisticated electronic device simulations as well as open-content educational resources. Most of the one million plus annual visitors to the nanoHUB access its educational resources. Lundstrom is a major contributor to nanoHUB content. More than 500,000 individuals have viewed his seminars, tutorials, and courses on nanoHUB.org.

In 2012, Lundstrom launched nanoHUB-U to provide free, online short courses on topics that were not yet widely taught. The goal of nanoHUB-U is to help students and working engineers acquire the breadth needed for the increasingly diverse electronics of the 21st Century – without requiring a long string of prerequisites. To complement nanoHUB-U, Lundstrom established the Lessons from Nanoscience Lecture Notes Series (World Scientific). In addition to bringing new content into the curriculum, the goal was to re-think the way traditional topics are understood so that working from the nanoscale to the system scale is seamless and intuitive.

On December 12, 2019, Lundstrom was named Acting Dean of the College of Engineering at Purdue University and served in that role until December 2020. He currently serves as Special Advisor on Microelectronics to the Executive Vice President for Strategic Initiatives at Purdue University.

== Awards ==
Lundstrom is the recipient of numerous awards. He was elected to the National Academy of Engineering in 2009 “For leadership in microelectronics and nanoelectronics through research, innovative education, and unique applications of cyberinfrastructure.” He was elected Fellow of the Institute of Electrical and Electronics Engineers (IEEE) in 1994 and elevated to Life Fellow status in 2017. Lundstrom was elected Fellow of the American Physical Society (APS) in 2000 “For insights into the physics of carrier transport in small semiconductor devices and the development of simple, conceptual models for nanoscale transistors.” He was elected Fellow of the American Association for the Advancement of Science (AAAS) in 2006 “For outstanding contributions in the area of simulating nanoscale metal-oxide-field-effect transistors, and for providing these simulations to users worldwide through the Internet.” In 2014, Lundstrom was included on the Thomson Reuters Corporation's list of The World’s Most Influential Scientific Minds.

Lundstrom has received two IEEE technical field awards: The 2002 IEEE Cledo Brunetti Award “For significant contributions to the understanding and innovative simulation of nano-scale electronic devices” and the 2018 IEEE Leon K. Kirchmayer Graduate Teaching Award “For creating a global online community for graduate education in nanotechnology as well as teaching, inspiring, and mentoring graduate students.” Lundstrom’s contributions to the semiconductor industry have been recognized by the Semiconductor Research Corporation’s Research Excellence Award (2002) “For creative, consistent contributions to the field of device physics and simulation of nanoscale MOSFETs” and by the Semiconductor Industry Association’s University Researcher Award (2005).

Lundstrom has also received awards for his contributions to education. He was the inaugural recipient of the IEEE Electron Device Society’s Education Award in 2006. In 2010, Lundstrom received the Aristotle Award from the Semiconductor Research Corporation, which recognizes outstanding teaching in its broadest sense. He received the IEEE Aldert van der Ziel Award in 2009 and the Frederick Emmons Terman Award from the American Society of Engineering Education in 1993.

Lundstrom’s contributions have also been recognized by Purdue University. In 2012, he received Purdue University’s Morrill Award, which is the highest honor the university confers on faculty in recognition of contributions to all three dimensions of a land grant university – teaching, research and engagement. Lundstrom also received the A. A. Potter Best Teacher Award from the College of Engineering in 1996 and the D.D. Ewing Teaching Award from the School of Electrical Engineering in 1995.

== Books ==
- Fundamentals of Carrier Transport, Vol. X of the Modular Series on Solid State Devices, Addison-Wesley Publishing Co. Reading, MA, 1990. (Second Ed. published by Cambridge University Press, October, 2000) ISBN 978-0-521-63724-4
- Nanoscale Transistors: Physics, Modeling, and Simulation (with Jing Guo), Springer, New York, 2006. ISBN 978-0-387-28002-8
- Near-equilibrium Transport: Fundamentals and Applications (with Changwook Jeong), World Scientific, Singapore, 2013. ISBN 978-981-4327-78-7
- Fundamentals of Nanotransistors World Scientific, Singapore, 2017. ISBN 978-981-4571-72-2
