= Purdue University School of Electrical and Computer Engineering =

Academic unit in West Lafayette, Indiana, US

Coordinates: 40°25.86′N 86°54.87′W

Elmore Family School of Electrical and Computer Engineering
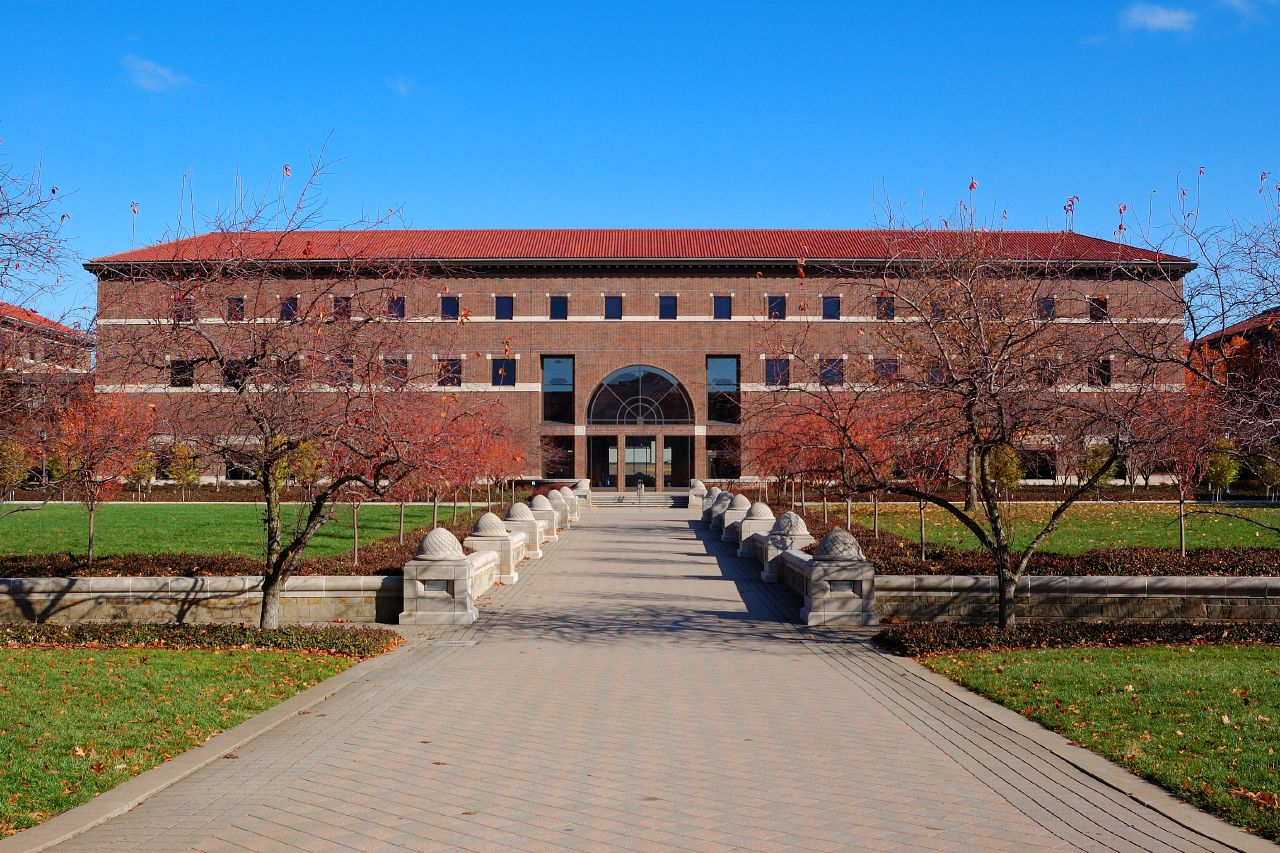
- MSEE Building
- Type: Public
- Established: 1888
- Affiliations: Purdue University
- Michael and Katherine Birck Head: Milind Kulkarni, Reilly Professor of Electrical and Computer Engineering
- Location: 465 Northwestern Ave. West Lafayette, IN 47907-2035, (United States) West Lafayette, Indiana, USA

The Elmore Family School of Electrical and Computer Engineering (ECE) is a department-level school within the College of Engineering at Purdue University.

The school offers both undergraduate B.S. degree as well as M.S. and Ph.D. graduate degrees in Electrical Engineering and Computer Engineering. The school enrolls over 1,900 undergraduates (sophomores through seniors) and over 1,300 graduate students. U.S. News & World Report ranks Purdue's Electrical Engineering 9th and Computer Engineering 10th at the Undergraduate level [America's Best Colleges 2023]. The Graduate programs in both Computer Engineering and Electrical Engineering are ranked 9th [America's Best Graduate Schools 2023] The online MS program in Electrical Engineering is ranked #1 in the nation (U.S. News & World Report, 2023).

== History ==
The School of Electrical and Computer Engineering (ECE) was established in 1888 with Louis Bell, Professor of Applied Electricity, as the head. At this time the first Electrical Engineering building was located opposite of Stanley Coulter Hall on the site of the present-day Wetherill Laboratory of Chemistry. Railroad tracks came alongside the building to provide a berth for the Purdue University Interurban Test Car.

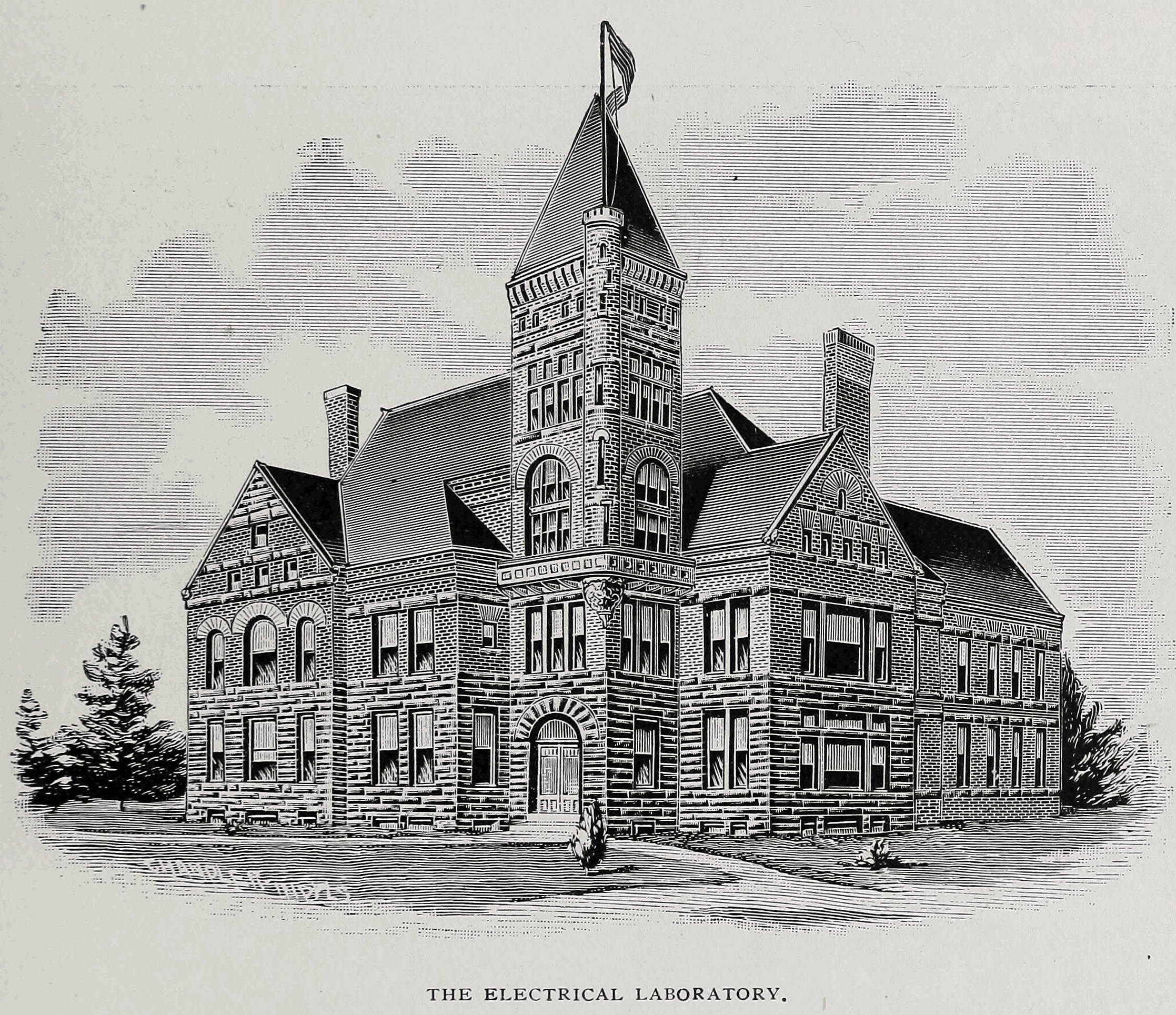
Purdue Electrical Laboratory, c. 1892

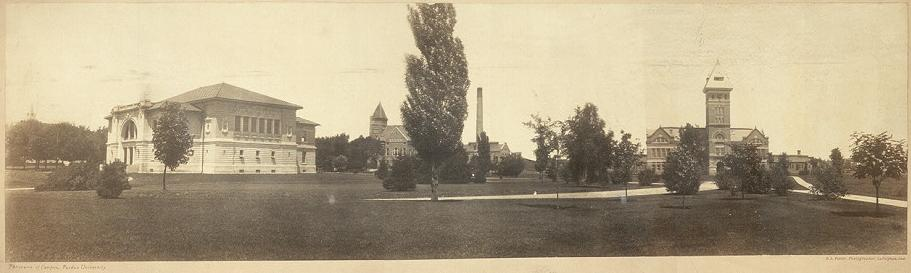
1904 Panorama of Purdue campus with Electrical Laboratory

In 1901, Telephone Engineering became part of ECE to accommodate the urgent need for engineers who understood how to expand telephone systems from city to city.

WBAA, Indiana's oldest surviving radio station, was started in Purdue ECE in 1922.

In 1924, a new Electrical Engineering building was constructed to celebrate Purdue's 50th birthday. Additions to the building were added in 1932 and 1940 made possible by Thomas Duncan, a Scottish immigrant who owned the nearby, highly successful Duncan Electric Company.

Purdue ECE played an important role in the early TV technology with Professor Roscoe George's many inventions including the first all-electronic television receiver.

The Lab for Applied Industrial Control was created in 1966.

The Materials and Electrical Engineering Building was built in 1988.

In 1996, the School of Electrical Engineering is officially renamed the School of Electrical and Computer Engineering.

In August 2021, the school was renamed as the Elmore Family School of Electrical and Computer Engineering, as a recognition of a $25M gift by venture capitalist Bill Elmore (BSEE75, MSEE76).

In September 2022, U.S. Secretary of State Antony Blinken, U.S. Secretary of Commerce Gina Raimondo, Indiana Governor Eric Holcomb, and Senator Todd Young toured the microelectronic training facilities at the Birck Nanotechnology Center to promote domestic semiconductor manufacturing in the U.S. as part of the 2022 CHIPS and Science Act.

=== School Heads ===
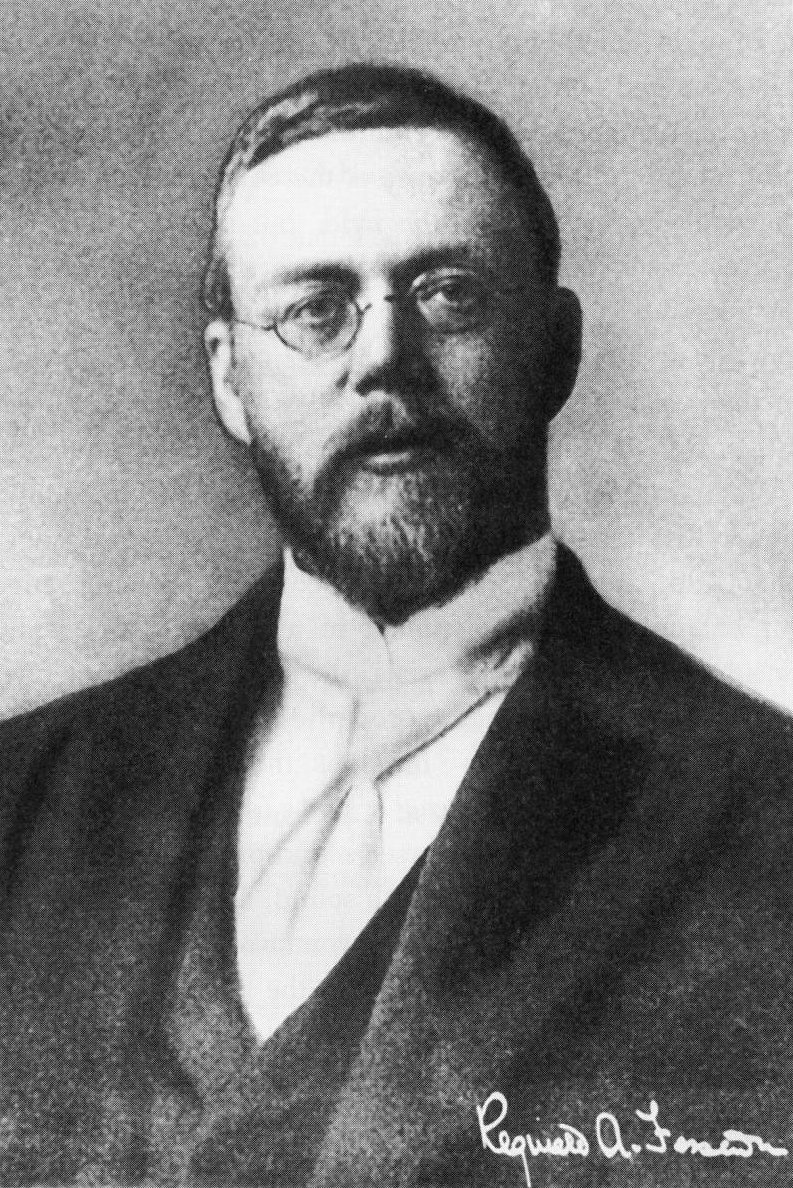
Reginald Fessenden, 3rd Head of Purdue ECE

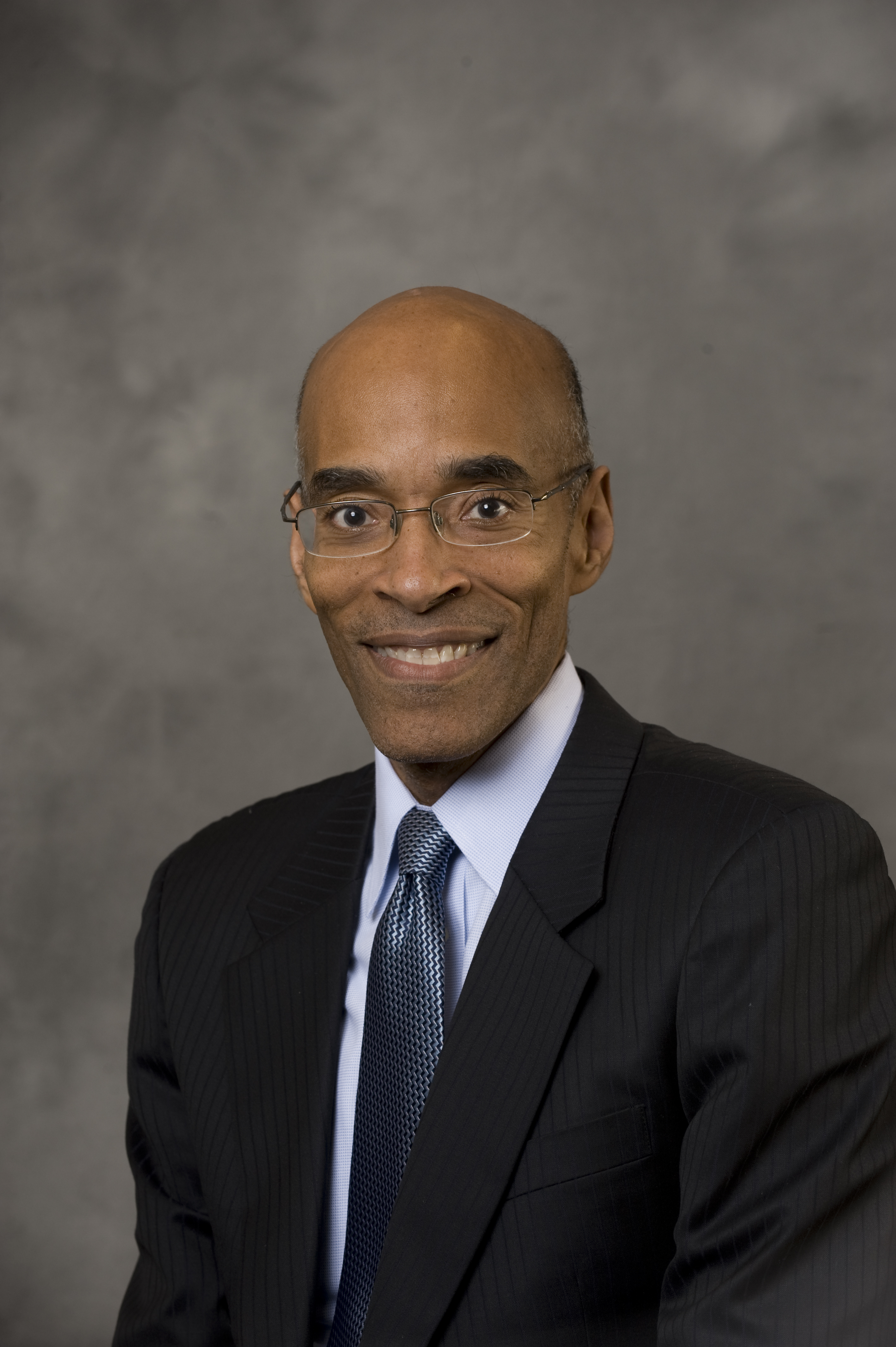
Mark Smith, 18th Head of Purdue ECE

Only non-interim heads are listed below.

- Milind Kulkarni, 2023-
- Dimitrios Peroulis, 2019–2023
- Ragu Balakrishnan, 2010–2018
- Mark J. T. Smith, 2003–2009
- Kent Fuchs, 1996–2002
- Richard Schwartz, 1985–1995
- Bernd Hoefflinger, 1984–1985
- Clarence Coates, 1972–1983
- John Hancock, 1965–1972
- William Hayt, 1962–1965
- Thomas Jones, 1958–1962
- Paul Chenea, 1957–1958
- J. Stuart Johnson, 1954–1957
- Dressel Ewing, 1942–1954
- Charles Francis Harding, 1908–1942
- Charles Matthews, 1904–1907
- Winder Goldsborough, 1896–1904
- Harold Smith, 1893–1896
- Reginald Fessenden, 1892–1893
- Albert Carman, 1889–1892
- Louis Bell, 1888–1889

== Student organizations ==
- Eta Kappa Nu, Beta Chapter (ΗΚΝ) - International Honor Society for Electrical Engineers
- IEEE - Student Chapter
- Purdue Student Engineering Foundation (PSEF)
- National Society of Black Engineers (NSBE)
- Society of Mexican American Engineers and Scientists (MAES)
- Society of Hispanic Professional Engineers (SHPE)
- Society of Women Engineers (SWE)
- Tau Beta Pi - National Engineering Honor Society
- Purdue Engineering Student Council (PESC)
- ECE Student Society (ECESS)

== Notable alumni ==
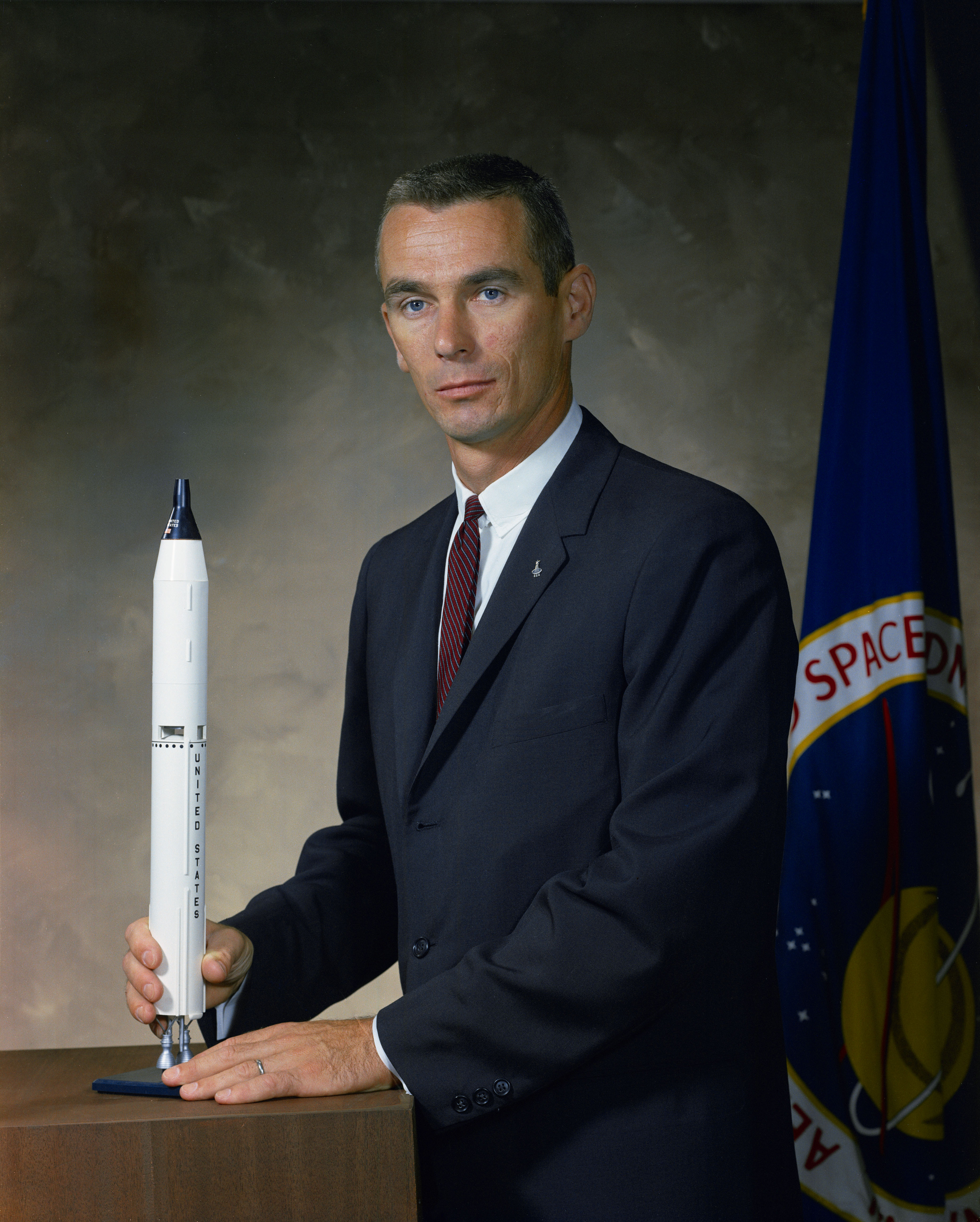
Eugene Cernan, BS'56

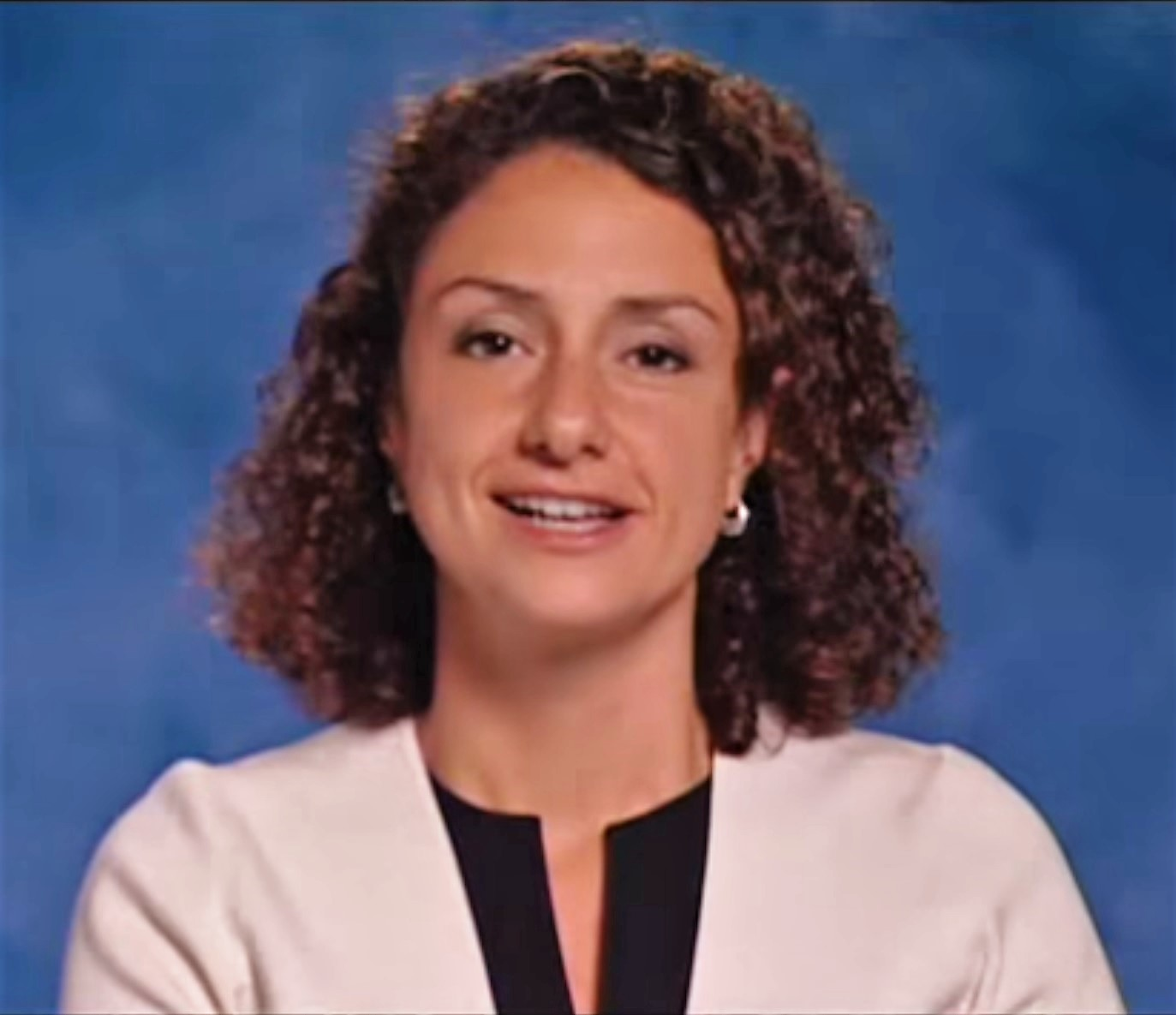
Lila Ibrahim, BS'93

- Edward W Davis, developed the taconite pellet process
- Fernley H. Banbury, inventor
- Rashid Bashir, dean of the University of Illinois at Urbana-Champaign Grainger College of Engineering
- Arthur J. Bond, dean of engineering at Alabama A&M, co-founder of NSBE
- Michael Birck, founder, former CEO, and chairman of Tellabs
- Eugene Cernan, NASA astronaut who walked on the Moon
- Clarence Cory, father of Electrical Engineering at UC Berkeley
- John Costas, inventor
- David Crosthwait, inventor who redefined the technology of indoor climate control
- Reginald Fessenden, former head, arranged first radio broadcast
- George H. Goble, 1996 Ig Nobel Prize winner
- Lila Ibrahim, COO at DeepMind
- Marwan Muasher, Jordanian ambassador to the U.S.
- Edward Purcell, Nobel Laureate for Nuclear Magnetism (MRI)
- George Mueller, director of NASA Apollo Moon landing project, father of Space Shuttle
- Valerie Taylor, computer scientist
- Don Thompson, Former President and CEO of McDonald's
- Blake Ragsdale Van Leer, 5th President of Georgia Institute of Technology
- Theodore Rappaport, a pioneer in wireless communication technology
- Edmund O Schweitzer III, (BSEE ‘68, MSEE ‘71) founder, president and CTO of Schweitzer Engineering Laboratories. Inventor of the first microprocessor based protection relay.
- William L. Wearly, CEO of Ingersoll-Rand
- David Wolf, NASA astronaut

== Notable faculty ==
- Jan Allebach
- Alexandra Boltasseva
- Carla Brodley, 1994–2004
- Mung Chiang
- Leon O. Chua, 1964–1970
- Clarence Coates, 1973–1988
- Supriyo Datta
- Reginald Fessenden, invented radio telephony
- King-Sun Fu, 1960–1985
- Kent Fuchs, 1996–2002
- Keinosuke Fukunaga
- Thomas Huang, 1973–1980
- Linda Katehi, 2002–2006
- Gerhard Klimeck
- Leah Jamieson
- Mark Lundstrom
- Dimitrios Peroulis
- Vladimir Shalaev
- Mark Smith, 2003–2017
- Andrew M. Weiner
- Jerry Woodall, 2005–2012
- Peide Ye
