= Dimitrios Peroulis =

American electrical engineer and educator

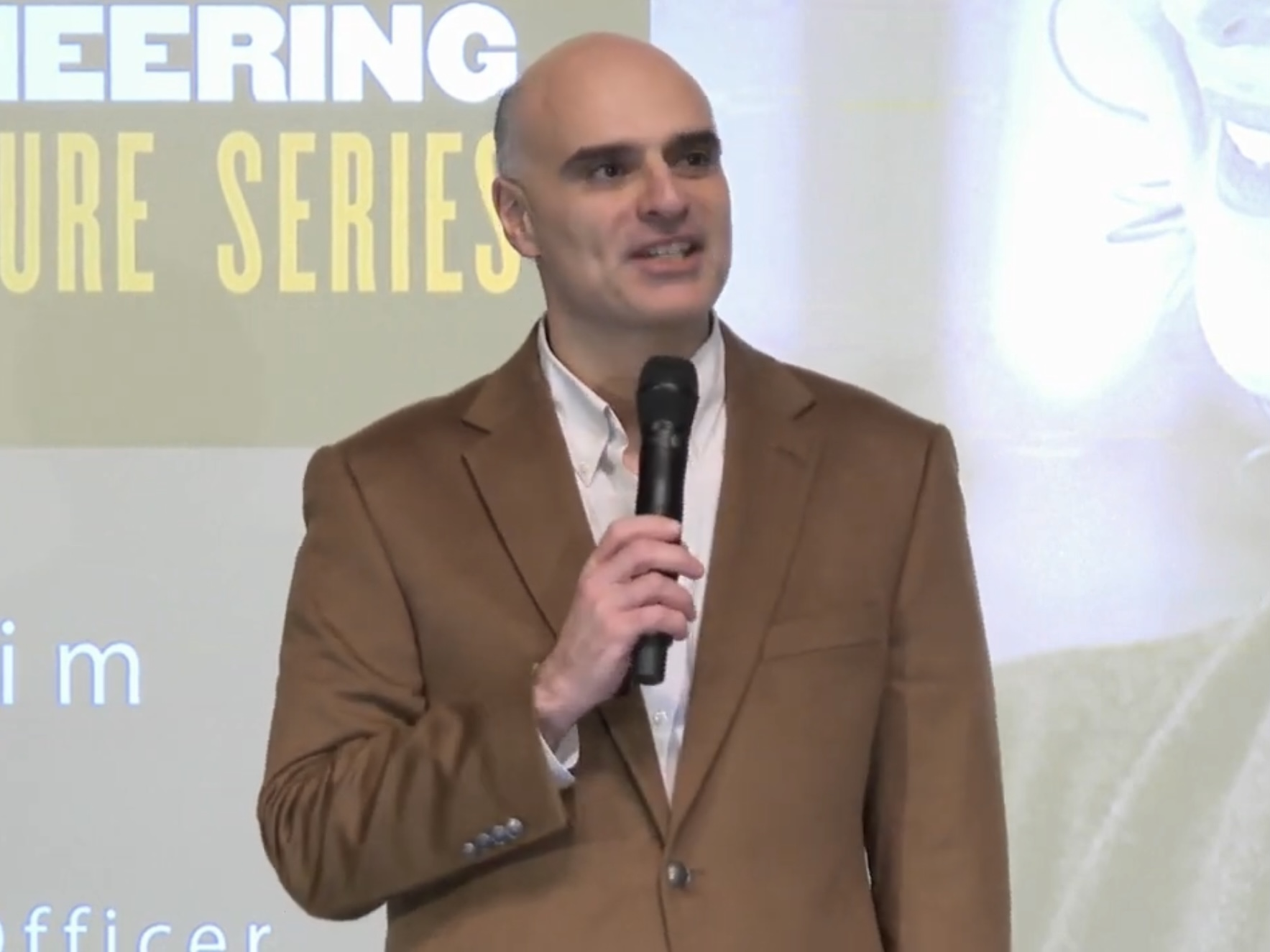
- Peroulis in 2019
- Education: University of Michigan, National Technical University of Athens
- Scientific career
- Fields: Applied electromagnetics; microwave engineering; RF MEMS; wireless sensors
- Workplaces: Purdue University
- Thesis: RF MEMS devices for multifunctional integrated circuits and antennas (2003)
- Doctoral advisor: Linda Katehi, Kamal Sarabandi

Dimitrios Peroulis is an American electrical engineer and educator. He is currently Reily Professor of Electrical and Computer Engineering and Senior Vice President for Purdue University Online. From 2019 to 2023, he was Michael and Katherine Birck Head of Elmore Family School of Electrical and Computer Engineering at Purdue University College of Engineering. Peroulis was elected IEEE Fellow in 2017 for his "contributions to MEMS-based tunable filters". He received, together with Andrea Alu and Mona Jarrahi, 2014 IEEE MTT-S Outstanding Young Engineer Award for "outstanding early career contributions to the microwave profession”. In 2013, Peroulis was inducted into the Purdue Book of Great Teachers which "honors outstanding teaching faculty who have demonstrated sustained excellence in the classroom". He was the recipient of a 2008 A. A. Potter Best of Engineering Teaching award and a 2010 Charles B. Murphy award, Purdue's highest undergraduate teaching honor.

Peroulis earned his M.S. and Ph.D. degrees from the University of Michigan. His undergraduate degree is from the National Technical University of Athens, Greece.

Peroulis is an inventor on 11 patents for reconfigurable RF systems and wireless sensor technologies.

== Books ==
- Electrical Engineering: Hands-on Learning (2012) Kendall Hunt Publishing Company, ISBN 146520573X.
- First Designs in Electrical Engineering (2016) Kendall Hunt Publishing Company, ISBN 1524903515.
- Tunable Evanescent-Mode Filters: Principles, Implementation, and Applications (2025) Wiley-IEEE Press, ISBN 1394216807.
