= Juliette Crosby =

American actress (1895–1969)

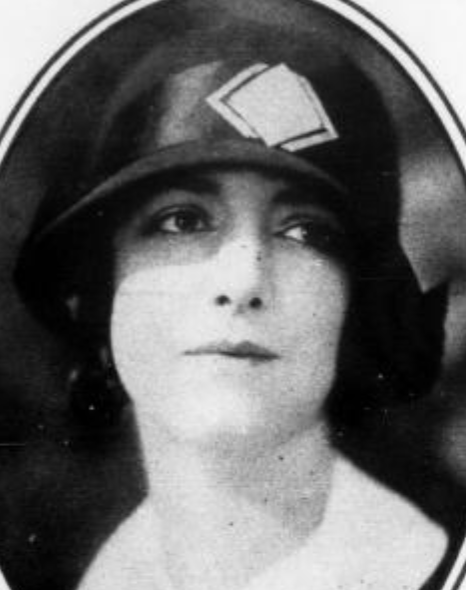
- Juliette Crosby, from a 1924 publication
- Born: September 14, 1895; Washington, D.C.
- Died: May 1, 1969 (aged 73); Plainville, Connecticut
- Occupation: Actress
- Spouse: Arthur Hornblow Jr. (m. 1924; div. 1936)
- Relatives: Miriam Caracciolo di Melito (sister)

Juliette Crosby (September 14, 1895 – May 1, 1969) was an American actress and debutante. She is perhaps best remembered for originating the role of Velma Kelly in Chicago in 1926.

== Early life ==
Crosby was born in Washington, D.C., the daughter of explorer and politician Oscar Terry Crosby and Jeanne Maria Bouligny Crosby (granddaughter of Charles Dominique Joseph Bouligny, US Senator from Louisiana). Her parents were both from Louisiana; her father was an author and traveler and served as Assistant Secretary of the Treasury in the Woodrow Wilson administration. She graduated from Holton-Arms School. She was presented as a debutante in Washington, D.C. Her older sister Miriam, also an actress, married Italian aristocrat Mario Carillo.

== Career ==
During World War I, Crosby went to France as a Red Cross nurse, while her father was director of the Commission for Relief in Belgium. Her Broadway credits included roles in Martinique (1920), The Nest (1922), The Love Child (1922 –1923), Home Fires (1923), The Show-Off (1924 –1925), Nirvana (1926), Chicago (1926–1927), and Charley's Aunt (1941). In the original production of Chicago, she was the first actress to play Velma Kelly. She appeared in two films, Paris Bound (1929) and Charming Sinners (1929). In 1935 and 1936, she toured in a production of Dodsworth with Walter Huston.

Crosby was considered stylish, and her dresses were photographed and described in detail in newspapers.

== Personal life ==
Crosby married playwright, theatre critic, and film producer Arthur Hornblow Jr. in 1923. They had a son, John Terry Hornblow. They divorced in 1936, a month before Hornblow married actress Myrna Loy. She died in Plainville, Connecticut in 1969, aged 73 years.
