= Venkataramanan =

Venkataramanan is a name. Notable people with the name include:

- P. Venkataramanan
- Venkataramanan Balakrishnan

== See also ==
- Venkataramana (disambiguation)
