= List of Phi Sigma Rho chapters =

Phi Sigma Rho is an American social sorority for individuals who identify as female or non-binary in science, technology, engineering, and mathematics. The sorority was founded in 1984 at Purdue University. In the following list, active chapters are indicated in bold and inactive chapters are in italics.

Chapter	Charter date and range	Institution	Location	Status	Ref.
**Alpha**	September 24, 1984	Purdue University	West Lafayette, Indiana	Active	
**Beta**	1988	Ohio State University	Columbus, Ohio	Active	
**Gamma**	1989	University of Dayton	Dayton, Ohio	Active	
**Delta**	1992	University of Toledo	Toledo, Ohio	Active	
**Epsilon**	1999	University of Kentucky	Lexington, Kentucky	Active	
**Zeta**	2000	University of Pittsburgh	Pittsburgh, Pennsylvania	Active	
**Eta**	2000	University of Michigan	Ann Arbor, Michigan	Active	
**Theta**	2001	University of Connecticut	Storrs, Connecticut	Active	
**Iota**	2001	Ohio Northern University	Ada, Ohio	Active	
**Kappa**	2002	University of Arkansas	Fayetteville, Arkansas	Active	
**Lambda**	2002	Pennsylvania State University	University Park, Pennsylvania	Active	
**Mu**	2002	University of Washington	Seattle, Washington	Active	
**Nu**	2003	University of California, Los Angeles	Los Angeles, California	Active	
**Xi**	2003	Rutgers University–New Brunswick	New Brunswick, New Jersey	Active	
**Omicron**	2003	Case Western Reserve University	Cleveland, Ohio	Active	
Pi	2004–2024	University of California, Irvine	Irvine, California	Inactive	
**Rho**	2004	Missouri University of Science and Technology	Rolla, Missouri	Active	(Note: Chapter formed from Gamma Beta Sigma, established in 1994.)
**Sigma**	2005	Oregon State University	Corvallis, Oregon	Active	
**Tau**	2005	University of Florida	Gainesville, Florida	Active	
**Upsilon**	2005	University of Houston	Houston, Texas	Active	
**Phi**	2006	Howard University	Washington, D.C.	Active	
**Chi**	2007	University of California, San Diego	San Diego, California	Active	
Psi	2011–2018	California State Polytechnic University, Pomona	Pomona, California	Inactive	
**Omega**	2011–2015, 2017	Virginia Commonwealth University	Richmond, Virginia	Active	
Alpha Alpha	2011–2025	Youngstown State University	Youngstown, Ohio	Inactive	
**Alpha Beta**	2011	University of Cincinnati	Cincinnati, Ohio	Active	
**Alpha Gamma**	2012	University of Louisville	Louisville, Kentucky	Active	
**Alpha Delta**	2012	Michigan State University	East Lansing, Michigan	Active	
**Alpha Epsilon**	March 2013	Grainger College of Engineering	Urbana, Illinois	Active	
Alpha Zeta	2013–2022	Wright State University	Fairborn, Ohio	Inactive	
**Alpha Eta**	2014	Vanderbilt University	Nashville, Tennessee	Active	
**Alpha Theta**	2015	University of California, Berkeley	Berkeley, California	Active	
Alpha Iota	2016–2022	Penn State Erie, The Behrend College	Erie, Pennsylvania	Inactive	
**Alpha Kappa**	2016	University of Arizona	Tucson, Arizona	Active	
**Alpha Lambda**	2016	Arizona State University	Tempe, Arizona	Active	
**Alpha Mu**	2017	University of Colorado Boulder	Boulder, Colorado	Active	
**Alpha Nu**	2017	Boise State University	Boise, Idaho	Active	
**Alpha Xi**	2017	University of California, Santa Barbara	Santa Barbara, California	Active	
**Alpha Omicron**	2018	University at Buffalo	Buffalo, New York	Active	
**Alpha Pi**	2019	University of Wyoming	Laramie, Wyoming	Active	
**Alpha Rho**	2019	Old Dominion University	Norfolk, Virginia	Active	
Alpha Sigma	2019–2025	University of Nevada, Reno	Reno, Nevada	Inactive	
**Alpha Tau**	2020	Northeastern University	Boston, Massachusetts	Active	
**Alpha Upsilon**	2020	Cleveland State University	Cleveland, Ohio	Active	
**Alpha Phi**	2020	Texas A&M University	College Station, Texas	Active	
Alpha Chi	2021-2025	Massachusetts Institute of Technology	Cambridge, Massachusetts	Inactive	
**Alpha Psi**	2022	Purdue University Fort Wayne	Fort Wayne, Indiana	Active	
**Alpha Omega**	2023	University of Akron	Akron, Ohio	Active	
**Beta Alpha**	2023	University of Alabama	Tuscaloosa, Alabama	Active	
**Beta Beta**	2023	North Carolina State University	Raleigh, North Carolina	Active	
**Beta Gamma**	2024	University of Utah	Salt Lake City, Utah	Active	
**Beta Delta**	2024	University of Georgia	Athens, Georgia	Active	
**Beta Epsilon**	2024	University at Albany	Albany, New York	Active	
**Beta Zeta**	2025	Miami University	Oxford, Ohio	Active	
**Prospective Chapter**	2026	Washington State University	Pullman, Washington	Active	
