= Mung Chiang =

Chinese American engineer (born 1977)

- 蒋濛
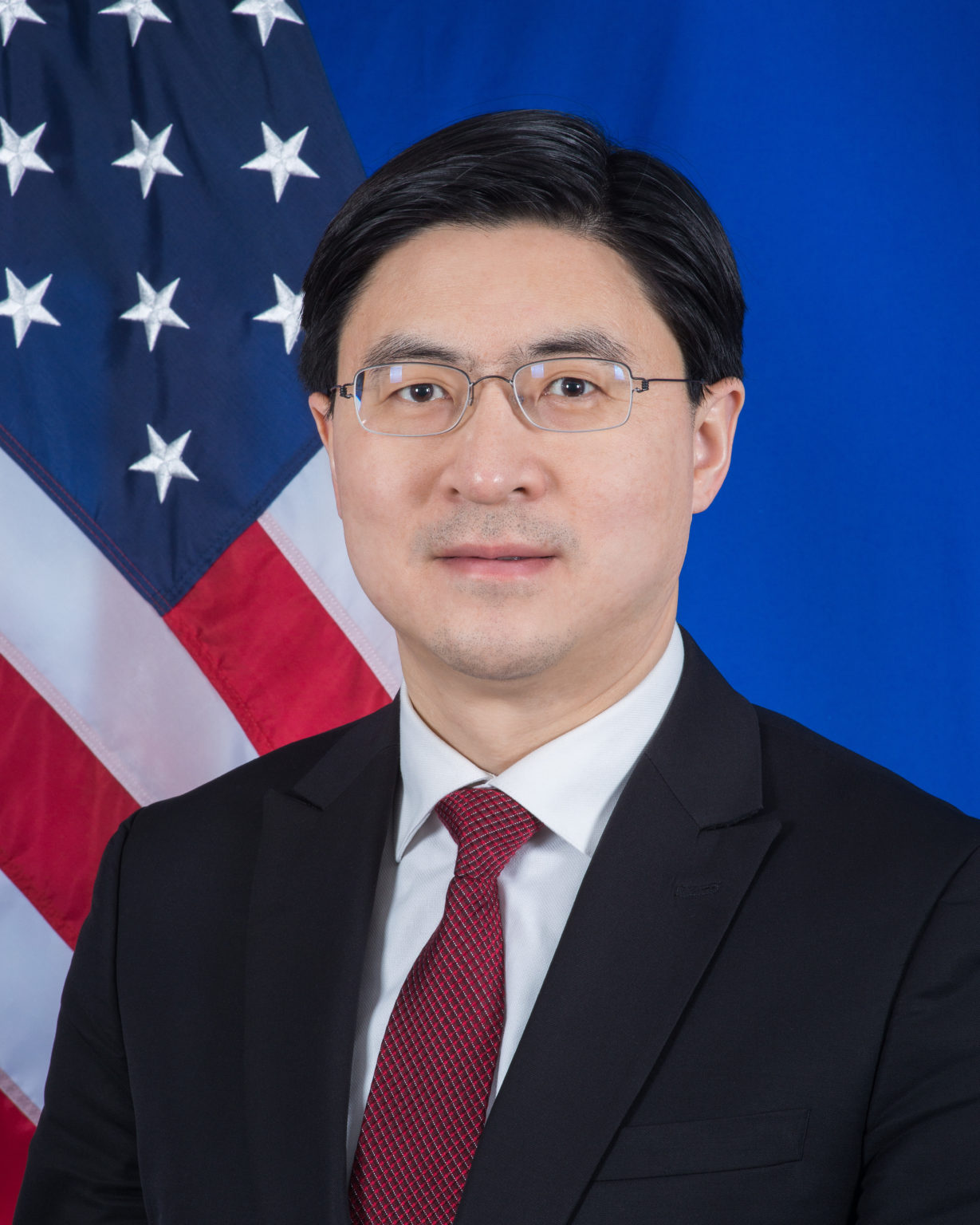
- Official portrait, 2020

18th President of Northwestern University
- Incumbent
- Assumed office July 1, 2026
- Preceded by: Henry Bienen (acting)

13th President of Purdue University
- In office January 1, 2023 – June 30, 2026
- Preceded by: Mitch Daniels
- Succeeded by: Mitch Daniels (acting)

6th Science and Technology Adviser to the Secretary of State
- In office December 16, 2019 – December 15, 2020
- President: Donald Trump
- Preceded by: Vaughan Turekian
- Succeeded by: Patricia Gruber

10th Dean of the Purdue University College of Engineering
- In office July 1, 2017 – June 30, 2022
- Preceded by: Leah Jamieson
- Succeeded by: Mark Lundstrom (acting)

Personal details
- Born: February 2, 1977 (age 49) Tianjin, China
- Education: Stanford University (BS, MS, PhD)
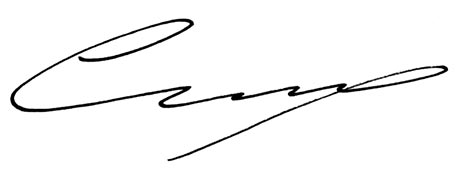
- Signature
- Scientific career
- Awards: Alan T. Waterman Award (2013); Guggenheim Fellow (2014); IEEE Founders Medal (2025)
- Fields: Electrical engineering Computer science
- Workplaces: Purdue University; Princeton University
- Thesis: Solving nonlinear problems in communication systems using geometric programming and dualities (2003)
- Doctoral advisor: Stephen P. Boyd; Thomas M. Cover

Mung Chiang (Chinese: 蒋濛; pinyin: Jiǎng Méng; born February 2, 1977) is a Chinese American electrical engineer who has been serving as the 18th president of Northwestern University since July 1, 2026.

Previously at Purdue University in Indiana, Chiang served as the 13th president from 2023 to 2026, as executive vice president for strategic initiatives from 2021 to 2023, and as dean of engineering from 2017 to 2023. He joined the faculty of Princeton University in 2003 and was appointed professor of electrical engineering in 2011.

== Early life and education ==
Mung Chiang was born on February 2, 1977, in Tianjin, China. In 1988, when Mung Chiang was 11 years old, his family went to Hong Kong to live with his grandmother. He re-took the fifth grade of primary school at Tak Sun School (德信學校), a full-time Catholic school for boys, and taught himself Cantonese, Traditional Chinese, and English.

After primary school, Chiang was admitted to Queen's College (皇仁書院) through examination by the school's independent admission quota. At his final semester in high school in 1995, he took the Hong Kong Certificate of Education Examination and obtained full A's in all 10 subjects. He was one of the four students of Queen's College that year who attained 10 A's in the exam. After graduating from high school, he traveled to the United States to enroll at Stanford University in 1995.

At Stanford, Chiang received a Bachelor of Science with double major in electrical engineering and mathematics in 1999, a Master of Science in electrical engineering in 2000, and a Ph.D. in electrical engineering in 2003.

== Career ==
=== Princeton University ===
Chiang was appointed assistant professor at Princeton University in 2004, associate professor with tenure in 2008, full professor in 2011, and the Arthur LeGrand Doty Professor of Electrical Engineering in 2013. While at Princeton, Chiang founded the Princeton EDGE Lab in 2009.

In 2015, Chiang, along with Helder Antunes and Tao Zhang, met to discuss the creation of a consortium to promote the standardization of fog computing, which eventually was formed as the OpenFog Consortium.

He received the 2016 Distinguished Teaching Award at the Princeton University School of Engineering and Applied Science.

=== Purdue University ===
On May 1, 2017, Purdue University named Chiang the dean of engineering, effective July 1, 2017. He was also appointed the Roscoe H. George Professor of Electrical and Computer Engineering. Starting in December 2019, Chiang took a one-year leave of absence to serve as the science and technology adviser to the United States secretary of state Mike Pompeo through the Intergovernmental Personnel Act Mobility Program.

On April 23, 2021, Purdue University named Chiang as Executive Vice President for Strategic Initiatives while continuing to lead the College of Engineering.

On June 10, 2022, the Purdue University Board of Trustees announced its unanimous election of Chiang to serve as the university's 13th president, effective January 1, 2023.

=== Northwestern University ===
On May 18, 2026, Northwestern University named Chiang the 18th president of the university, effective July 1, 2026.

== Awards and honors ==
- 2007 – ONR Young Investigator Award
- 2007 – Technology Review TR35 Young Innovator Award
- 2008 – Presidential Early Career Award for Scientists and Engineers
- 2012 – IEEE Kiyo Tomiyasu Award
- 2012 – IEEE INFOCOM Best Paper Award
- 2012 – IEEE Fellow
- 2013 – Alan T. Waterman Award
- 2013 – ASEE Frederick Emmons Terman Award in Engineering Education
- 2013 – IEEE SECON Best Paper Award
- 2014 – Guggenheim Fellow
- 2014 – INFORMS Information Systems Design Science Award
- 2016 – Princeton School of Engineering and Applied Sciences (SEAS) Distinguished Teacher Award
- 2020 – National Academy of Inventors fellow
- 2020 – Royal Swedish Academy of Engineering Sciences international fellow.
- 2022 – IEEE INFOCOM Achievement Award
- 2024 – Honorary Doctor of Science, Dartmouth College
- 2025 – IEEE Founders Medal

== Publication ==
Chiang co-authored an undergraduate technical textbook Networked Life: 20 Questions and Answers (Cambridge University Press, 2012; ISBN 978-1107024946) and a popular science book The Power of Networks: Six Principles That Connect Our Lives (Princeton University Press, 2016; ISBN 9780691183305). The first book received the PROSE Awards in Science and Technology Writing in 2013 from the Association of American Publishers. The second book was mentioned in various popular media, such as in TIME Magazine.
