= Richard Notebaert =

Businessman (born 1947)

Richard C. Notebaert
- Born: 1947 (age 78–79); Montreal, Canada
- Education: University of Wisconsin–Madison, BA, 1969; University of Wisconsin–Milwaukee, MBA, 1983
- Occupations: Chairman and CEO of Qwest, Tellabs and Ameritech
- Spouse: Peggy Notebaert
- Children: Michele and Nicole

Richard C. Notebaert (born 1947 in Montreal, Canada) is the former chairman and CEO of Qwest, Tellabs and Ameritech. He was credited for saving Qwest from bankruptcy, and making Ameritech the most successful "Baby Bell".

Notebaert is a member of the board of directors of Aon, Cardinal Health and American Electric Power He is also the chair of University of Notre Dame's board of trustees. In 2003, Notebaert was appointed by President George Bush to the National Security Telecommunications Advisory Committee.

== Career ==
Notebaert was born in Montreal, Quebec, Canada in 1947 and grew up in Columbus, Ohio. After graduating from University of Wisconsin–Madison with a bachelor's degree in 1969, he joined Wisconsin Bell marketing operation. He was promoted to the vice president of marketing and operations in 1983 after he obtained an MBA from University of Wisconsin–Milwaukee. After that he worked as president for Ameritech Mobile Communications, Indiana Bell Telephone Company, Ameritech Services. In 1994, he became the president and CEO of Ameritech Corporation. He was the chairman and CEO of Tellabs from 2000 to 2002. Notebaert became the chairman and CEO of Qwest in June 2002. He retired in August 2007.
