= Introduction to Statistical Pattern Recognition =

- Author: Keinosuke Fukunaga
- Language: English
- Subject: Statistical pattern recognition
- Genre: Non-fiction
- Published: 1972 (Academic Press)

Introduction to Statistical Pattern Recognition is a book by Keinosuke Fukunaga, providing an introduction to statistical pattern recognition. The book was first published in 1972 by Academic Press, with a 2nd edition being published in 1990.

== Synopsis ==
- Chapter 1: Introduction
- Chapter 2: Random Vectors and Their Properties
- Chapter 3: Hypothesis Testing
- Chapter 4: Parametric Classifiers
- Chapter 5: Parameter Estimation
- Chapter 6: Nonparametric Density Estimation
- Chapter 7: Nonparametric Classification and Error Estimation
- Chapter 8: Successive Parameter Estimation
- Chapter 9: Feature Extraction and Linear Mapping for Signal Representation
- Chapter 10: Feature Extraction and Linear Mapping for Classification
- Chapter 11: Clustering

== Reception ==
The book has received reviews from publications including Thomas M. Cover in the journal IEEE Transactions on Information Theory, Anthony J. Duben in the journal ACM Computing Reviews, and John Clements Davis in the journal Computers & Geosciences.

== Editions ==
- Introduction to Statistical Pattern Recognition (Academic Press, 1972)
- Introduction to Statistical Pattern Recognition - 2nd Edition (Academic Press, 1990)
- Introduction to Statistical Pattern Recognition - 2nd Edition (Academic Press, 2013)
