= Case School of Engineering =

Engineering college in Cleveland, Ohio, US

- Type: Private engineering school
- Established: 1880
- Parent institution: Case Western Reserve University
- Dean: Venkataramanan "Ragu" Balakrishnan
- Faculty: 118
- Students: 2,853
- Location: Cleveland, Ohio, U.S. 41°30′10″N 81°36′29″W
- Website: www.case.edu/engineering/

The Case School of Engineering is the engineering school of Case Western Reserve University, a private research university in Cleveland, Ohio. It traces its roots to the 1880 founding of the Case School of Applied Science. The school was endowed by Leonard Case, Jr. in 1877 and became the Case Institute of Technology in 1947 until merging with Western Reserve University in 1967. It was officially named the Case School of Engineering in 1992.

== Departments ==
- Biomedical Engineering
- Chemical & Biomolecular Engineering
- Civil And Environmental Engineering
- Computer & Data Sciences
- Electrical, Computer And Systems Engineering
- Macromolecular Science & Engineering
- Materials Science & Engineering
- Mechanical & Aerospace Engineering

== Notable alumni ==
- Paul Buchheit (BS '98, MS '98): 23rd Google employee and creator of Gmail
- Elizabeth Cosgriff-Hernandez: Professor of Biomedical Engineering at The University of Texas at Austin who works on scaffolds for tissue regeneration
- Herbert H. Dow (BS 1888): Founder of Dow Chemical
- Siegfried Hecker (BS '65, MS '67, PhD '68): Former director of Los Alamos National Laboratory and co-recipient of the 2009 Enrico Fermi Award
- Robert J. Herbold (MS '66, PhD '88): Former executive vice president and COO of Microsoft
- Samuel Hibben (BS '10): Pioneer in blacklight technology and lighting display designer for the Statue of Liberty, Washington Monument, and other United States monuments
- Alexander Kummant (BS '82): Former president and CEO of Amtrak
- Craig Newmark (BS '75, MS '77): Founder of Craigslist
- Frank Rudy (BS '50): Inventor of the Nike Air Sole
