= Eve's Secret =

1925 film directed by Clarence G. Badger

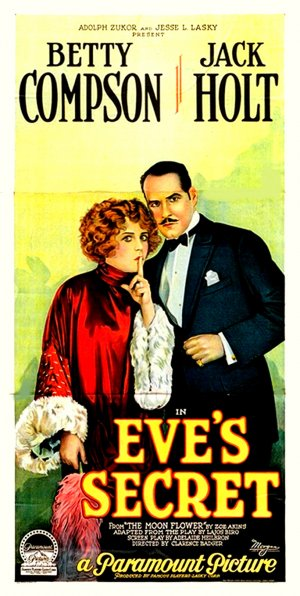
- Film poster
- Directed by: Clarence Badger
- Written by: Adelaide Heilbron (scenario)
- Based on: Moon-Flower by Zoë Akins
- Produced by: Adolph Zukor; Jesse L. Lasky
- Starring: Jack Holt; Betty Compson
- Cinematography: H. Kinley Martin
- Distributed by: Paramount Pictures
- Release date: May 11, 1925
- Running time: 60 minutes; 6 reels (6,305 feet)
- Country: United States
- Language: Silent (English intertitles)

Eve's Secret is a 1925 American silent romantic comedy film produced by Famous Players–Lasky and released by Paramount Pictures. It is based on a Broadway play, Moon-Flower, by Zoë Akins, adapted from a Hungarian play by Lajos Bíró. On Broadway Elsie Ferguson starred. Clarence Badger directed Betty Compson and Jack Holt.

== Plot ==
As described in a film magazine review, the Duke of Poltava meets Eve, the daughter of a cobbler, and, wishing to marry her, sends her to Paris to be educated. She becomes the object of attention and the Duke fights many duels because of his jealousy concerning her. When she meets Pierre, a childhood chum, she dines with him, which incurs the wrath of the Duke. During the duel, the Duke, believing that she loves Pierre, permits himself to be struck. The wound is slight. Eve finds that she loves the Duke greatly, culminating in their marriage.

== Cast ==
- Betty Compson as Eve
- Jack Holt as Duke of Poltava
- William Collier Jr. as Pierre
- Vera Lewis as The Duchess
- Lionel Belmore as The Baron
- Mario Carillo as Prince Boris
- E. La Croix Du Duit as The Duke's Physician

== Preservation ==
A complete 35mm print of Eve's Secret is held by the Library of Congress.
