= Leonora Hornblow =

American novelist

- Born: Leonora Salmon; June 3, 1920; New York City, US
- Died: November 5, 2005 (aged 85); Fearrington Village, North Carolina, US
- Occupation: Novelist; children's literature writer; socialite
- Genre: Children's fiction
- Years active: 1950–1989
- Spouses: Wayne Morris (m. 1939; div. 1940) Arthur Hornblow Jr. (m. 1945; died 1976)
- Children: 1

Leonora Hornblow (née Salmon; later Schinasi; June 3, 1920 – November 5, 2005) was an American novelist, children's literature writer and socialite. She wrote two novels in the 1950s, wrote for Liberty magazine and Los Angeles Daily News, edited a collection of short stories with publisher Bennett Cerf, and collaborated with her second husband Arthur Hornblow Jr. on a series of children's books from 1965 to 1974.

== Biography ==
Hornblow was born Leonora Salmon June 3, 1920, in New York City to Ruby and Sidney Salmon. When she was a baby, Hornblow was given the nickname "Bubbles" by her mother because Leonora was not considered "a baby's name", something which she later resented. Her mother married tobacco baron Leon Schinasi and Hornblow became his stepdaughter. She was raised in New York City, and began writing from an early age. In 1939, Hornblow married actor Wayne Morris; the 18-month marriage produced a son, Michael. She subsequently married film producer and writer Arthur Hornblow Jr. at the home of publisher Bennett Cerf in 1945.

The following year, she began writing fashion notes for Liberty magazine and later wrote book reviews for Los Angeles Daily News. Hornflow wrote her first novel, Memory and Desire, in 1950, centred on the film community. She joined the Authors Guild soon after. She had her sole appearance in a motion picture as a character actress in the 1952 war drama film Thunder in the East. In 1957, her second novel, The Love Seekers, was published, and she later moved into book editing with Cerf on a collection of short stories entitled Bennett Cerf’s Take Along Treasury. Hornblow wrote a children's book on the Egyptian queen Cleopatra in 1961. This was followed by a collaboration with her husband on more children's books as Birds Do the Strangest Things in 1965, Fish Do the Strangest Things the next year, Insects Do the Strangest Things in 1968, Reptiles Do the Strangest Things in 1970, and Prehistoric Monsters Did the Strangest Things in 1974.

After the death of her husband in 1976, Leonora's busy New York life included a passion for stationery shops. She returned to writing fiction. Hornblow’s final manuscript was lost while traveling. She moved to North Carolina to be closer to her son, Michael, in 2003. She died at her home in Fearrington Village, North Carolina, on November 5, 2005, after a short undisclosed illness.

Sidney Zion described Hornblow as "the savvieest broad in town". The personal papers and biographical details of Hornblow and her husband are housed in the Margaret Herrick Library, which is operated by the Academy of Motion Picture Arts and Sciences.
