= Keinosuke Fukunaga =

Japanese American scientist and educator

Keinosuke Fukunaga is a Japanese American scientist and educator known for his contributions to statistical pattern recognition. Fukunaga published some of the earliest monographs in the field of machine learning. He is the author of the book Introduction to Statistical Pattern Recognition, first published in 1972 by Academic Press.

Fukunaga was born in Himejishi, Japan on July 23, 1930. He graduated with a BS and PhD in Electrical Engineering from Kyoto University in 1953 and 1962, respectively. He also received an MS degree from the University of Pennsylvania in 1959. He has been on the faculty of Purdue University School of Electrical and Computer Engineering since 1966.

He was elected Fellow of the Institute of Electrical and Electronics Engineers "(f)or contributions to statistical pattern recognition" in 1979.
