= Louis Bell (engineer) =

American engineer, physicist, inventor and academic (1864–1923)

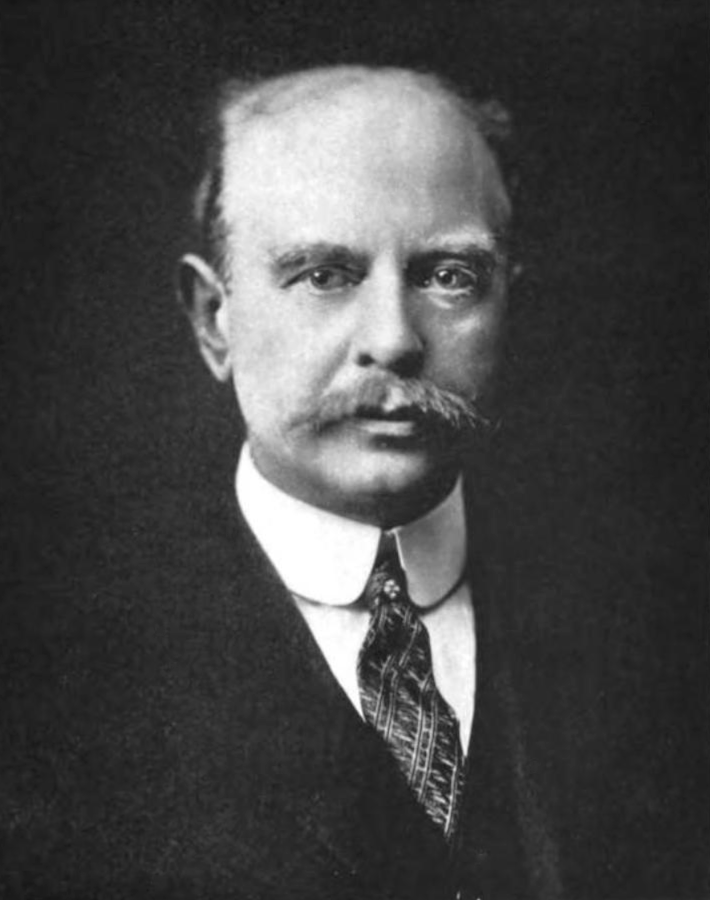
- Born: December 5, 1864; Chester, New Hampshire, US
- Died: June 14, 1923 (aged 58); West Newton, Massachusetts, US
- Resting place: Chester, New Hampshire
- Education: Ph.D., Johns Hopkins University, 1888
- Spouse: Sarah G. Hemenway
- Parents: Louis Bell (Sr.) (father); Mary Anne Persis Bouton (mother)
- Scientific career
- Thesis: On the Absolute Wave-length of Light (1888)
- Doctoral advisor: Henry A. Rowland

Louis Bell (December 5, 1864 – June 14, 1923) was an American engineer, physicist, inventor, and academic. He was an early pioneer in illumination engineering and the transmission of electricity, being awarded 25 patents in power transmission.

== Biography ==
Louis Bell was born December 5, 1864, in the small village of Chester, New Hampshire, the youngest child of Louis Bell (Sr.) and Mary Anne (Mollie) Persis Bouton. His father was a New Hampshire lawyer who died in 1865 while serving as a Union Army colonel at the battle of Fort Fisher during the American Civil War. His mother died shortly thereafter, leaving Louis Bell and his older sister Marion to be raised by their grandmother, Lucy G. Bell née Smith, the widow of prominent New Hampshire politician Samuel Bell.

An intelligent boy, Bell was an avid reader, and his studies were encouraged by his grandmother. At the age of ten he attended the nearby Northwood Academy. Two years later, Bell was sent to be educated at Phillips Exeter Academy, and he matriculated to Dartmouth College in 1880. There he studied physics and chemistry, among other subjects, while taking an interest in astronomy. He graduated with an A.B. in 1884, after winning final honors in physics, honorable mention in English, and serving as associate editor of The Dartmouth.

After remaining a year at Dartmouth as a post-graduate, he spent three years in residence at Johns Hopkins University studying physics and chemistry under Henry A. Rowland. Bell was awarded a Ph.D. in 1888 with a thesis titled On the Absolute Wave-length of Light. He next joined the staff of Purdue University as a professor seated in the newly established chair of applied electricity. While there he organized the instruction as head of the newly founded school of electrical engineering. Resigning at the end of the year, he joined the consulting firm of Bliss and Bell. In 1890, he became editor of Electrical World, a weekly journal owned by the W. J. Johnston company. Bell would maintain a literary connection with the publication for the remainder of this life.

In 1892, he was hired as chief engineer for the power transmission department of the General Electric company. Bell would design some of the nation's first polyphase power transmission plants. The same year, he published The Electric Railway in collaboration with Oscar T. Crosby. During 1893, he supervised the installation of the nation's first three-phase generators at the Redlands Power Plant in Mill Creek, California. He went on to work on the Folsom Powerhouse, which became the most powerful in the world at that time. Using a system Bell designed, this generator transmitted a now-standard 60 Hz frequency alternating current over long-distance lines, 35 miles (56 km) to Sacramento in 1895. It was the first facility in the nation to do this.

He married Sarah Gross Hemenway in 1893. Sarah was a Dartmouth alumni from the class of 1884. They would have one son, Louis Hemenway Bell.

Bell became a Boston engineering consultant in 1895, and he remained in this job for the rest of his life. Initially his focus was on power transmission, but later he specialized in the engineering of illumination. He lectured at both Harvard and the Massachusetts Institute of Technology. In 1897, he authored Electric Power Transmission, which became a standard textbook on the subject for several years. During the Spanish–American War (1898), Bell served as a technical officer in the Volunteer Electrical Corps.

His Art of Illumination was published in 1902 and became a standard work on the topic. He contributed articles on electric power transmission and electric motors to the 10th and 11th editions of Encyclopædia Britannica. In 1908, Bell served as the third president of the Illuminating Engineering Society. During World War I, he was a member of the advisory committee for the Council of National Defense. For a period of ten years he served as vice president of the Illuminating Engineering Society of Great Britain. During the early days of the automobile, he worked on headlights and the development of headlight lenses.

Bell retained an interest in astronomy for much of his life, and in 1922 he authored The Telescope. He was known to be a good shot and had a life-long love of the outdoors. He died June 14, 1923. An honorary Doctorate of Science was awarded to him by Dartmouth College shortly after his death.

== Bibliography ==
- Bell, Louis (July 1884), "Temperature of the spheroidal state", Science, 4 (74): 5, Bibcode:1884Sci.....4....5B, doi:10.1126/science.ns-4.74.5, PMID 17813385.
- Bell, Louis (1888), "The absolute wave-length of light", Philosophical Magazine, Series 5, 25 (155): 245–263, doi:10.1080/14786448808628181.
- Henry A, Rowland; Bell, Louis (July 1888), "On an explanation of the action of a magnet on chemical action", American Journal of Science, 36 (211), New Haven: 39, doi:10.1080/14786448808628244.
- Bell, Louis (1891), The elements of practical electricity.
- Bell, Louis (March 1891), "Electricity as the rival steam", Journal of the Franklin Institute, 131 (3): 212–227, Bibcode:1891FrInJ.131..212B, doi:10.1016/0016-0032(91)90250-7.
- Crosby, Oscar Terry; Bell, Louis (1892), The electric railway in theory and practice, W. J. Johnston Company.
- Bell, Louis (January 1896), "Urban growth and the electric railway", Street Railway Journal: 10–13.
- Bell, Louis (1897), Power distribution for electric railroads, Street Railway Publishing Company.
- Bell, Louis (1902), The art of illumination, McGraw Publishing Company.
- Bell, Louis (1906), Electric power transmission, a practical treatise for practical men (4th ed.), McGraw Publishing Company.
- Bell, Louis (1906), "Wake up, America! Manufacturing methods which imperil our trade", The Engineering Magazine, 31 (6), New York: 801–808.
- Bell, Louis (September 1907), "The physiological basis of illumination", Proceedings of the American Academy of Arts and Sciences, 43 (4): 77–96, doi:10.2307/20022310, JSTOR 20022310.
- Bell, Louis; Marks, L. B.; Ryan, W. D'A. (1907), "The illumination of the building of the Edison Electric Illuminating Company of Boston", Transactions of the Illuminating Engineering Society, 2 (7).
- Bell, Louis (1907), "Coefficients of diffuse reflections", Transactions of the Illuminating Engineering Society, 2 (7).
- Bell, Louis (March 1908), "Note on some meteorological Uses of the polariscope", Proceedings of the American Academy of Arts and Sciences, 43 (15): 407–412, doi:10.2307/20022354, JSTOR 20022354.
- "The principles of shades and reflectors", Transactions of the Illuminating Engineering Society, 4 (8), 1909.
- Bell, Louis (1910), "Street photometry", Transactions of the Illuminating Engineering Society, 5 (5).
- Bell, Louis (April 1911), "On the opacity of certain glasses for the ultra-violet", Proceedings of the American Academy of Arts and Sciences, 46 (24): 671–680, doi:10.2307/20022693, JSTOR 20022693.
- Bell, Louis (1911), "Photometry at low intensities", Transactions of the Illuminating Engineering Society, 6 (7).
- Bell, Louis (May 1914), "Types of abnormal color vision", Proceedings of the American Academy of Arts and Sciences, 50 (1): 3–13, doi:10.2307/20025503, JSTOR 20025503.
- Bell, Louis (March 1914), "Present tendencies in street lighting", General Electric Review, 17 (3), General Electric Company: 302–304.
- Verhoff, F. H.; Bell, L.; Walker, C. B. (1916), "The pathological effects of radiant energy upon the eye", Proceedings of the American Academy of Arts and Sciences, 51: 629–818.
- Bell, Louis (October 3, 1919), "Visibility of bright lines", Science, 50 (1292): 331–332, Bibcode:1919Sci....50..331B, doi:10.1126/science.50.1292.331, PMID 17834971.
- Bell, Louis (February 1921), "Ghosts and oculars", Proceedings of the American Academy of Arts and Sciences, 56 (2): 45–58, doi:10.2307/20025832, JSTOR 20025832.
- Bell, Louis (1922), The telescope, McGraw-Hill book Company, Incorporated.
