= Diplomacy (1926 film) =

1926 film

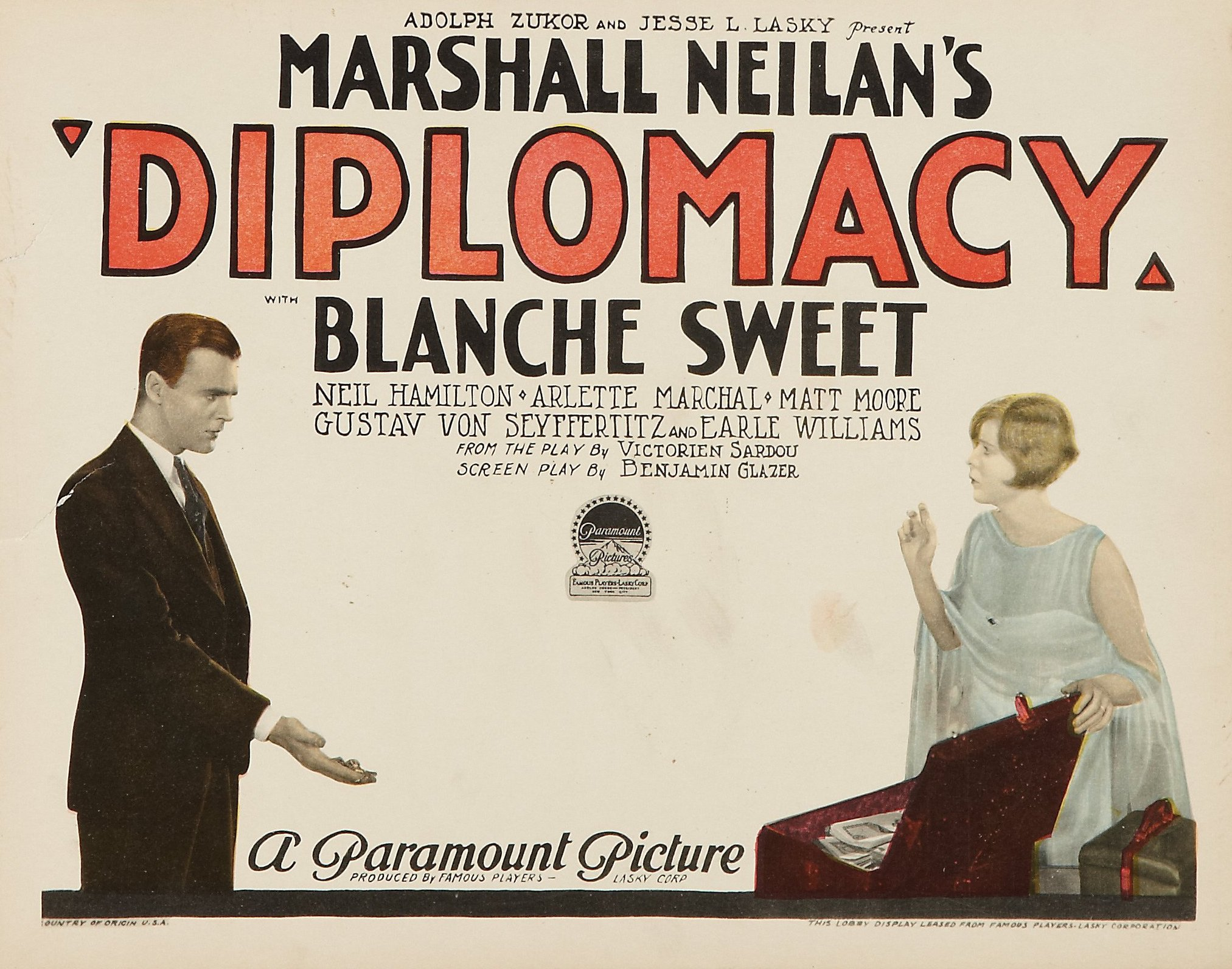
- Directed by: Marshall Neilan
- Written by: Benjamin Glazer (scenario)
- Based on: Dora by Victorien Sardou
- Starring: Blanche Sweet
- Cinematography: David Kesson; Donald Keyes
- Production company: Famous Players–Lasky
- Distributed by: Paramount Pictures
- Release date: September 20, 1926
- Running time: 70 minutes
- Country: United States
- Languages: Silent; English intertitles

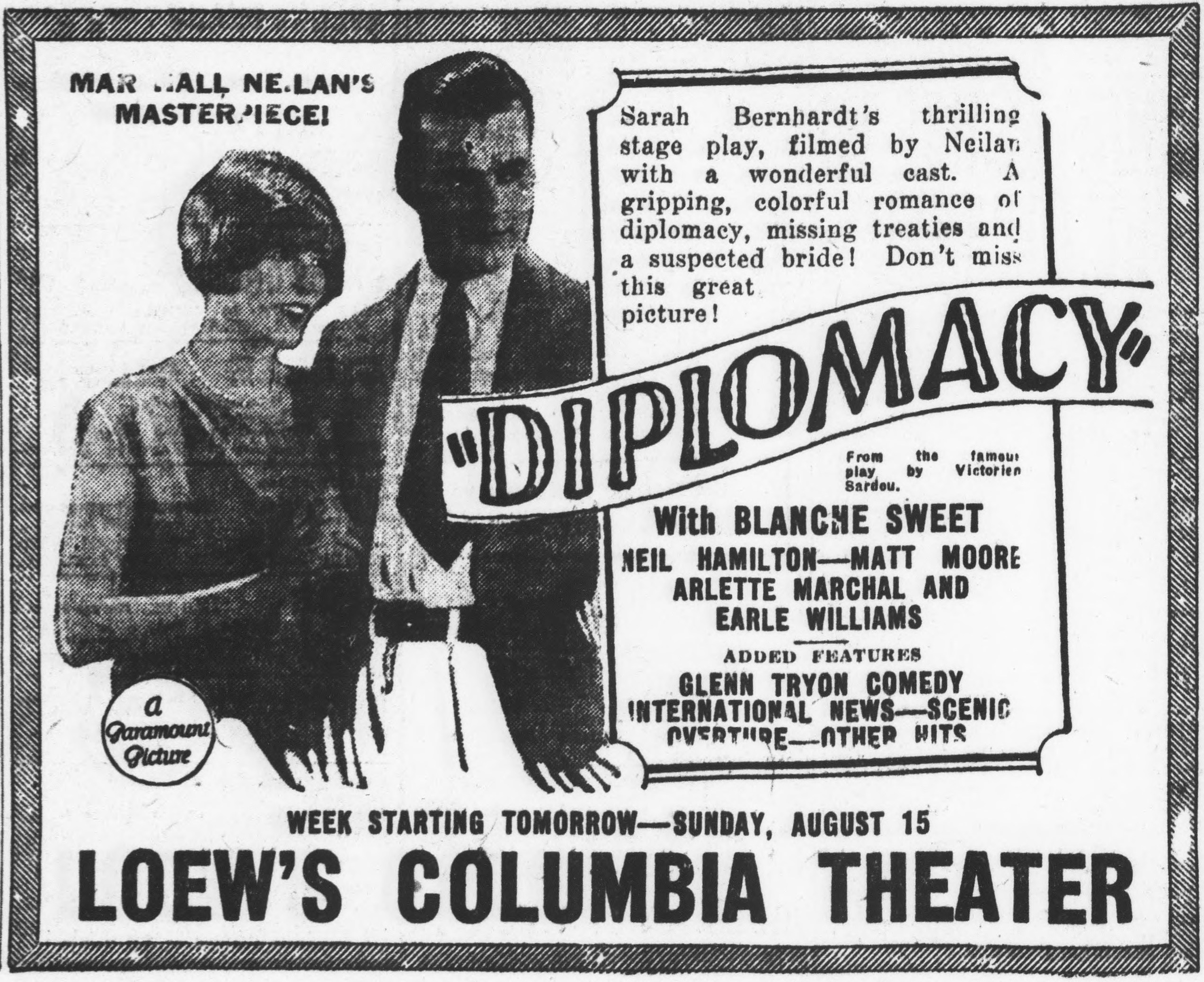
Contemporary newspaper advertisement

Diplomacy is a 1926 American silent mystery film produced by Famous Players–Lasky and distributed through Paramount Pictures. The movie is an update of the play Dora by Victorien Sardou. Marshall Neilan directs his then wife Blanche Sweet who stars.

== Cast ==
- Blanche Sweet as Dora
- Neil Hamilton as Julian Weymouth
- Arlette Marchal as Countess Zicka
- Matt Moore as Robert Lowry
- Gustav von Seyffertitz as Baron Ballin
- Earle Williams as Sir Henry Weymouth
- Arthur Edmund Carewe as Count Orloff
- Julia Swayne Gordon as Marquise de Zares
- David Mir as Reggie Cowan
- Charles "Buddy" Post as the baron's secretary
- Mario Carillo as John Stramir
- Sojin Kamiyama as Chinese diplomat
- Edgar Norton as servant
- Linda Landi as servant

== Preservation status ==
A copy of the film is preserved at the Library of Congress.

== See also ==
- Blanche Sweet filmography
