= Oscar Terry Crosby =

American engineer, executive, author and explorer

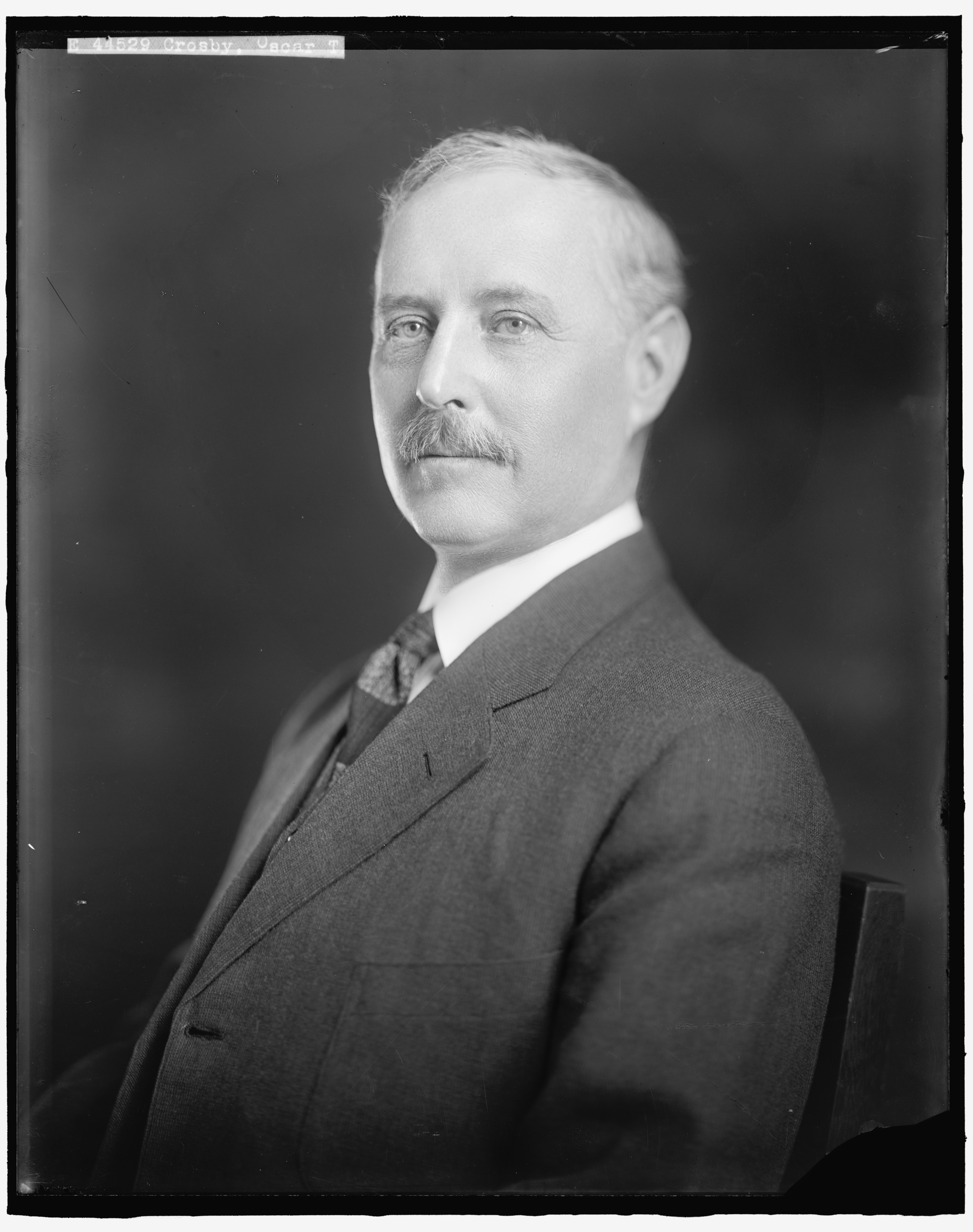
- Crosby in 1905
- Born: April 21, 1861; Ponchatoula, Louisiana
- Died: January 2, 1947 (aged 85); Warrenton, Virginia
- Education: United States Military Academy
- Title: United States Assistant Secretary of the Treasury
- Term: 1917–1918
- Predecessor: Andrew J. Peters
- Successor: Leo S. Rowe
- Spouse: Jeanne Maria Bouligny
- Children: Miriam Terry Crosby (b. 1886); Elizabeth (b. 1894); Juliette Crosby (b. 1895); Celeste (b. 1900); Junior
- Parents: George Locke Crosby (father); Elizabeth Terry (mother)
- Awards: Honorary LL. D., George Washington University (1907); Order of the Crown; Medal of French Gratitude; Legion of Honour

Oscar Terry Crosby (April 21, 1861 – January 2, 1947) was an American engineer, executive, author, and explorer. A West Point graduate, he served as the United States Assistant Secretary of the Treasury during World War 1.

== Biography ==
Crosby was born April 21, 1861, in Ponchatoula, Louisiana, son of Reverend George Locke Crosby and Elizabeth Terry. He grew up during the Reconstruction era, receiving an education at a private school in Brookhaven, Mississippi. At the age of 17, he purchased a one-way ticket to West Point where he passed the United States Military Academy admittance exam. On September 1, 1878, Curtis entered the academy as a cadet. He graduated second in his class on June 13, 1882, and was commissioned a second lieutenant in the Army Corps of Engineers. On September 30, he was assigned to the Army installation at Willet's Point, New York. Crosby attained the rank of first lieutenant on July 3, 1883.

He was married to Jeanne Maria Bouligny in 1886. Jeanne was the granddaughter of Dominique Bouligny, who served as a U.S. senator from Louisiana from 1824 to 1829. The couple would have five children, including the socialite Miriam Terry Crosby and actress Juliette Crosby. After an extended leave of absence starting on April 23, Crosby resigned his military commission on October 22, 1887.

=== Business career ===
He was hired by Frank J. Sprague as an assistant for a project to construct an electric streetcar line in Richmond, Virginia for the Richmond Union Passenger Railway. Despite the hurdles of making this new technology reliable, the line was operational by February 1888, although it took until May before it was operating satisfactorily. Crosby became a general superintendent of the Sprague Electric Railway and Motor Company.

In 1889, Crosby worked with Baltimore inventor David G. Weems to assemble a small experimental electric locomotive on a 28-gauge test track laid down in Laurel, Maryland. Invented by Weems, the goal of this vehicle was to achieve high-speed rail using electrical power. They were able to bring the small locomotive up to a top speed of 115 mph (185 km/h). Crosby's ideas for high-speed rail included regenerative braking, magnetic brakes, all-steel train cars, and streamlining. However, the concept was technologically ahead of its time and would be left for others to develop.

Crosby was a general manager for the railway department of General Electric Company. He served as president of various local public utilities in Chester, Pennsylvania; Wilmington, Delaware; and Washington D. C. In 1892, he collaborated with Louis Bell to publish The Electric Railway in Theory and Practice.

Crosby became the first president of the Potomac Electric Power Company (PEPCo) in 1896. On March 12, he applied to the city commissioners of Washington, D.C., for an agreement to extend power lines into the city. This was approved June 21 and the company began operations. He then bid on a contract to provide street lighting for the city. This contract was initially awarded to United States Electric Lighting, but Crosby was ultimately successful after a court challenge. This began a commercial contest between the two companies, which came to an end in January 1889 when the stock owners of PEPCO acquired their rival.

In 1897, a group of financiers led by Crosby took over the Anacostia & Potomac Railway. Crosby wanted to combine all Washington D.C. power and railway businesses into a single business. In this he was successful, and they merged into the Washington Traction and Electric Company. However, this effort floundered when the company defaulted on interest payments following the 1899–1900 recession, going bankrupt in June 1901. The business was acquired by Washington Railway and Electric Company in February, 1902.

Between February and June 1900, Crosby traveled from Zeila in Somaliland through Ethiopia to Khartoum in the Sudan. He wrote a travelogue about his experiences titled Notes on a journey from Zeila to Khartoum, and this was published in The Geographical Journal in 1901. For his African explorations, he was named a Fellow of the Royal Geographical Society (F.R.G.S.). In 1903, Crosby began an extended trip to Asia, starting from London, travelling across Russia by railway to Turkistan, then by foot (in sometimes extreme conditions) to Tibet. In Russia, he met Fernand Anginieur, a fellow explorer from France, and the two men traveled together. In 1905 he published his experiences in a book titled, Tibet and Turkestan, journey through old lands and a study of new conditions.

=== Retirement ===
In 1904, the Crosby family purchased a large property named the View Tree Farm, which covered 358 acres on top of Watery Mountain to the west of Warrenton, Virginia. Crosby built a 24-room manorial residence on this site in 1906. It would remain in the family until 1950, when it was acquired by the U.S. government. Their daughter Elizabeth drowned in the town's water reservoir in October 1906. Crosby was awarded an honorary Legum Doctor (LL.D.) degree by the George Washington University in 1907. He was considered for the post of minister to China in 1909. Crosby published a book titled, Strikes: when to strike, how to strike, a book of suggestion for the buyers and sellers of labour in 1910. At that time he was President of the Wilmington & Philadelphia Traction Company, but resigned from this position in 1913 and retired from the railroad business.

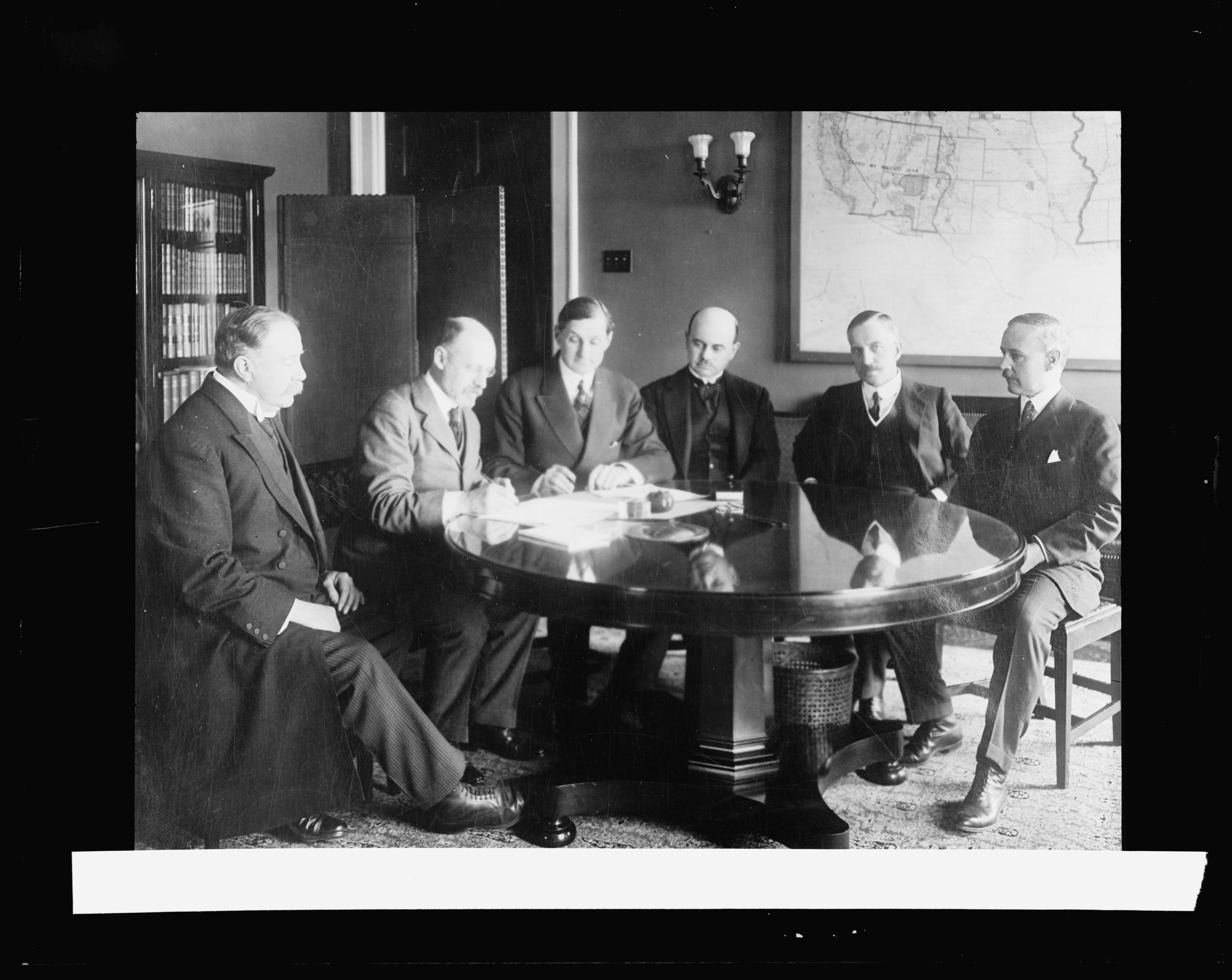
Signing the British War Loan, 1917; Crosby is at right

The newly elected President Woodrow Wilson favored Crosby for the post of Governor-General of the Philippines in 1913. However, this was objected to by Manuel L. Quezon because of Crosby's military background. Instead, Crosby's friend Francis B. Harrison was selected. When World War I broke out in Europe, Crosby was in China. He made his way back to the United States by travelling through Siberia and Europe. Herbert Hoover asked him to become the director of relief work in France and Belgium, a post he accepted in March 1915. After six months he returned home, then wrote a book.

The United States joined the war in April 1917, and Crosby was commissioned with the rank of Major of engineers in the Army reserve corps. However, his friend William G. McAdoo requested Crosby for the position of Assistant Secretary of the Treasury. Crosby assumed the post on April 15, 1917, and remained there for a period of six months. At the behest of President Wilson, Crosby was named the United States representative to the Inter-Allied Council on War Purchases in October 1917, and was voted President of this council based on the importance of the United States to their activities. When the war came to an end, Crosby was in poor health and had to remain in Paris for several months.

In 1919, he authored a book titled, International war, its causes and its cure. He was a proponent of the use of an international police force to enforce the rulings of an international tribunal. His book titled Adam and Eve was published in 1926. In 1927, he would resume his international travel, making trips to South West Africa in 1927; Tanganyika, Kenya and the Belgian Congo in 1936; and Romania, Russia, Poland, and Germany in 1937. He died January 2, 1947, in Warrenton.

For his international efforts, Crosby was made a Commander de la Légion d'honneur, and received the Order of the Crown of Italy and Order of the Crown from Belgium. He was a member of the Cosmos Club in Washington, D.C. His collected papers are held by the Manuscript Division of the Library of Congress.

== Bibliography ==
- Crosby, O. T.; Bell, L. (1892), The electric railway in theory and practice, New York: W. J. Johnston Co.
- Crosby, O. T. (1901), "Notes on a journey from Zeila to Khartoum", The Geographical Journal, 18, Royal Geographical Society, doi:10.2307/1775763, JSTOR 1775763.
- Crosby, O. T. (1902), "Personal Impressions of Menelik", The Century Magazine, 63 (6): 875–884.
- Crosby, O. T. (1905), Tibet and Turkestan, journey through old lands and a study of new conditions, New York; London: G. P. Putnam's Sons.
- Crosby, O. T. (1910), Strikes: when to strike, how to strike, a book of suggestion for the buyers and sellers of labour, New York: G.P. Putnam's Sons.
- Crosby, O. T. (July 1916), "An Armed International Tribunal the Sole Peace-Keeping Mechanism", The Annals of the American Academy of Political and Social Science, 66 (1): 32–34, doi:10.1177/000271621606600107, S2CID 143862414.
- Crosby, O. T. (1919), International war, its causes and its cure, London: Macmillan and Co., Limited.
- Crosby, O. T. (May 1920), "The Dangers of International Governmental Loans", The Annals of the American Academy of Political and Social Science, 89 (1): 227–233, doi:10.1177/000271622008900129, S2CID 143095059.
- Crosby, O. T. (July 1921), "The Essentials of a World Organization for the Maintenance of Peace", The Annals of the American Academy of Political and Social Science, 96 (1): 153–159, doi:10.1177/000271622109600132, JSTOR 1014224, S2CID 144318748.
- Crosby, O. T. (July 1923), "The European Tangle and Some Suggestions as to Its Unraveling", The Annals of the American Academy of Political and Social Science, 188 (1): 15–22, doi:10.1177/000271622310800103, JSTOR 1015104, S2CID 144603414.
- Crosby, O. T. (July 1924), "French Policy Since the Armistice", The Annals of the American Academy of Political and Social Science, 114 (1): 44–48, doi:10.1177/000271622411400109, JSTOR 1015349, S2CID 144845363.
- Crosby, O. T. (July 1925), "The Dawes Plan a Temporary Basis for Reparation Payments", The Annals of the American Academy of Political and Social Science, 120 (1): 11–15, doi:10.1177/000271622512000104, JSTOR 1015629, S2CID 144362639.
- Crosby, O. T. (August 1925), "The Enforcement of Prohibition", The North American Review, 221 (827): 621–625, JSTOR 25113424.
- Crosby, O. T. (1926), Adam and Eve, Boston: Stratford Company.
