= Mark Smith (fencer) =

American fencer

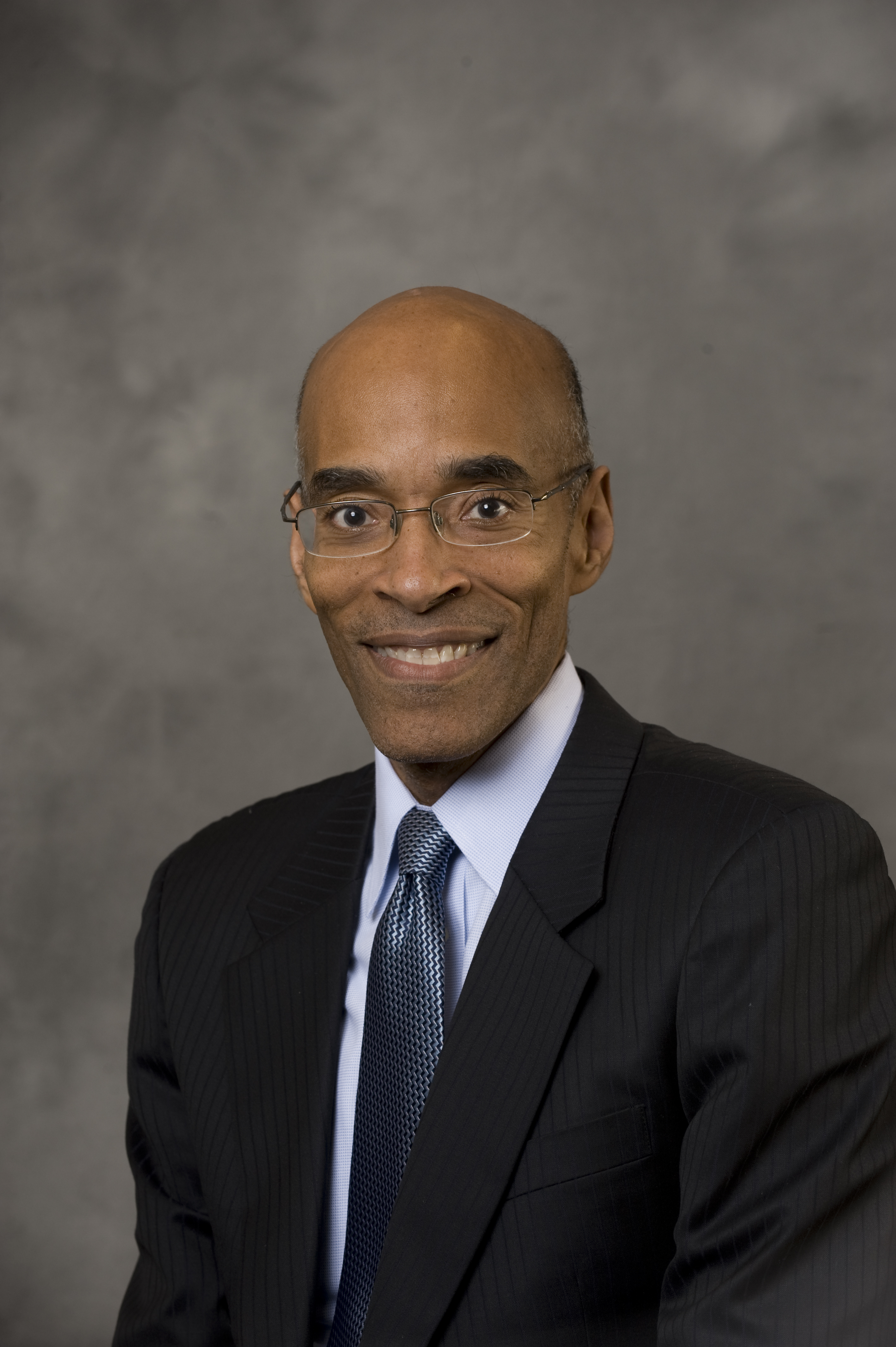
- Smith in 2009

Personal information
- Born: May 17, 1956 (age 70) New York, New York, United States

Sport
- Sport: Fencing

Mark Smith (born May 17, 1956) is an American fencer, engineer and educator. He competed in the team foil event at the 1984 Summer Olympics. From 2003 to 2009, he served as the 18th head of Purdue University School of Electrical and Computer Engineering. Smith is now the dean of the graduate school at the University of Texas at Austin.
