= Miriam Caracciolo di Melito =

American actress and socialite

Countess Miriam Caracciolo di Melito
- Born: Miriam Terry Crosby; 1888; New Orleans, United States
- Died: August 25, 1966 (aged 77–78); Rome, Italy
- Occupation: socialite
- Spouse: "Count" Mario Caracciolo di Melito
- Children: 1
- Parent(s): Oscar Terry Crosby; Jeanne Maria Bouligny
- Relatives: Juliette Crosby (sister)

Countess Miriam Terry Caracciolo di Melito (née Crosby; 1888 – 23 August 1966) was an American socialite. Born into a prominent family from New Orleans, she was the daughter of the United States Assistant Secretary of the Treasury. She grew up in Virginia and Washington, D.C., where she was a prominent debutante. She married the Italian-American actor Mario Carillo, becoming an Italian noblewoman upon her marriage and assuming the courtesy title of countess in society events. She was the sister of stage actress Juliette Crosby.

== Biography ==
Miriam Terry Crosby was born in New Orleans in 1888 to explorer and politician Oscar Terry Crosby (1861–1947) and his wife Jeanne Maria Bouligny Crosby (granddaughter of Charles Dominique Joseph Bouligny, US Senator from Louisiana). Her father was the United States Assistant Secretary of the Treasury during the Woodrow Wilson administration and as the president of the International Council of Finance during World War I. She was the older sister of Juliette Crosby and of Celeste Crosby. A prominent debutante, Crosby was well known in Washington D.C.'s high society.

She married the actor Mario Carillo, born Nobile Mario Caracciolo dei Duchi [of the Dukes] di Melito, aka "Count" Mario Caracciolo di Melito, a former Italian cavalry officer who immigrated to the United States to pursue a Hollywood career. The wedding, a private ceremony in Naples, was attended by the Duke of Cerranova, the Duke of Mondragone, the Baron Compagna, and Prince Ludovico Spada Veralli Potenziani. The Caracciolos had a son, Ludovico Caracciolo di Melito.

Countess Caracciolo di Melito remained a renowned society hostess in her adult life, hosting functions at View Tree, her parents' estate in Virginia, and attending society events in Virginia and Washington, D.C.

She died in Rome on 23 August 1966.
