= Arthur Hornblow Jr. =

American film producer

- Hornblow in 1936
- Born: March 15, 1893; New York City, US
- Died: July 17, 1976 (aged 83); New York City, US
- Occupation: Film producer
- Spouses: Juliette Crosby (m. 1924; div. 1936) Myrna Loy (m. 1936; div. 1942) Leonora Schinasi (m. 1945)

Arthur Hornblow Jr. (March 15, 1893 – July 17, 1976) was an American film producer. Four of his movies received Academy Award nominations for Best Picture.

== Biography ==
Hornblow was the son of Arthur Hornblow Sr. (1865–1942), a writer who edited Theatre Magazine in New York City.

Hornblow graduated from DeWitt Clinton High School, New York City, in 1911, before studying at Dartmouth College and New York Law School, and was a member of the fraternity Theta Delta Chi. He served in counter-intelligence during World War I, and then tried his hand at playwriting. He was then hired as a production supervisor by Sam Goldwyn at Paramount in 1927.

Initially, he specialized in the popular screwball comedies, eventually giving Billy Wilder his first directing job, and producing several films starring Bob Hope. These included The Cat and the Canary (1939), The Ghost Breakers (1940) and Nothing But the Truth (1941). In 1942 he moved to MGM where he produced Gaslight and several film noir. In the 1950s, as an independent producer rather than a studio employee, he worked on the musical Oklahoma and the courtroom drama Witness for the Prosecution, directed by his former Paramount colleague, Wilder.

He gave aspiring actress Marie Windsor her first screen test, and Constance Ockelman her new name, Veronica Lake.

Four of his movies received Academy Award nominations for Best Picture.

=== Death ===
Hornblow died on July 17, 1976 at Lennox Hill Hospital at the age of 83.

== Oscar nominations ==
As a producer he was nominated for an Academy Award 'Best Picture' Oscar four times, but failed to win.

- Ruggles of Red Gap (1935), comedy-western with Charles Laughton.
- Hold Back the Dawn (1941), romantic-comedy with Charles Boyer and Olivia de Havilland.
- Gaslight (1944), thriller with Ingrid Bergman, Charles Boyer and Joseph Cotten.
- Witness for the Prosecution (1957), courtroom drama with Charles Laughton, Tyrone Power, Marlene Dietrich, and Elsa Lanchester.

== Legacy ==
He allowed a version of his last name be used by C. S. Forester (who, together with Niven Busch, was a scriptwriter for one of the films he directed) for the fictional sea captain Horatio Hornblower.

== Selected filmography ==
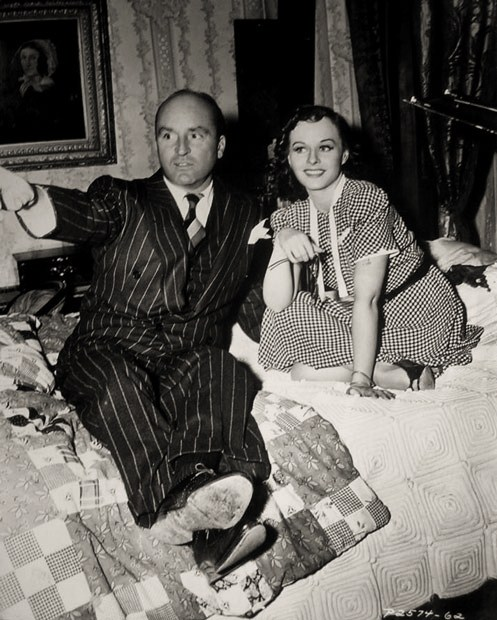
Hornblow and Paulette Goddard on the set of The Cat and the Canary (1939)

- Four Hours to Kill! (1935)
- The Princess Comes Across (1936)
- Easy Living (1937)
- High, Wide, and Handsome (1937)
- Midnight (1939)
- The Cat and the Canary (1939)
- The Ghost Breakers (1940)
- Arise, My Love (1940)
- The Major and the Minor (1942)
- Gaslight (1944)
- Desire Me (1947)
- The Hucksters (1947)
- Cass Timberlane (1947 film)
- The Asphalt Jungle (1950)
- Million Dollar Mermaid (1952)
- Oklahoma! (1955)
- The War Lover (1962)

== Books ==
- A History of the Theatre in America From its Beginnings to the Present Time Vol. 1 (J.B. Lippincott Company, 1919), ISBN 9781628452334
- A History of the Theatre in America From its Beginnings to the Present Time Vol. 2 (J.B. Lippincott Company, 1919), ISBN 9781628452594

With Leonora Hornblow:

- Animals Do the Strangest Things, illus. Michael K. Frith (Random House, 1964), 62 pp., LCCN 64-19132

The Hornblows, Frith, and Random House collaborated to produce numerous sequels, Birds Do the Strangest Things (1965), and so on.
