= Peide Ye =

Peide "Peter" Ye is the Richard J. and Mary J. Schwartz Professor of Electrical and Computer Engineering at Purdue University, and was named Fellow of American Physical Society in 2016, and Fellow of the Institute of Electrical and Electronics Engineers (IEEE) in 2013 "for contributions to compound semiconductor MOSFET materials and devices".

Ye earned his B.S. from Fudan University in Shanghai, China in 1988 and his Ph.D. from Max Planck Institute for Solid State Research in Stuttgart, Germany in 1996.
