= Phi Sigma Rho =

American engineering social sorority

- ΦΣΡ
- Founded: September 24, 1984; 42 years ago Purdue University
- Type: Social
- Affiliation: Independent
- Status: Active
- Emphasis: Engineering
- Scope: National
- Motto: "Together we build the future"
- Pillars: Friendship, Scholarship, Encouragement
- Colors: Wine red and silver
- Symbol: Star and pyramid
- Flower: Orchid
- Jewel: Pearl
- Mascot: Sigmand the penguin
- Publication: The Key
- Philanthropy: Blood Cancer United
- Chapters: 47
- Colonies: 1
- Members: > 2,700 active > 12,000 lifetime
- Nickname: Phi Rho or PSR
- Headquarters: PO Box 100545; Denver, Colorado 80250; United States
- Website: www.phisigmarho.org

Phi Sigma Rho (ΦΣΡ; also known as Phi Rho or PSR) is a social sorority for individuals who identify as female or non-binary in engineering and technology. The sorority was founded in 1984 at Purdue University. It has since expanded to more than 50 colleges across the United States.

== History ==
Phi Sigma Rho was founded on September 24, 1984, at Purdue University. Its founders were Rashmi Khanna and Abby McDonald who were unable to participate in traditional sorority rush due to the demands of the sororities and their engineering program; they decided to start a new sorority that would take their academic program's demands into consideration.

The Alpha chapter at Purdue University was founded with ten charter members: Gail Bonney, Anita Chatterjea, Ann Cullinan, Pam Kabbes, Rashmi Khanna, Abby McDonald, Christine Mooney, Tina Kershner, Michelle Self, and Kathy Vargo.

Phi Sigma Rho is a social sorority that accepts students pursuing degrees in engineering and technology who identify as female or who identify as non-binary. The sorority made the decision to include non-binary students in all chapters in the summer of 2021.

The sorority's headquarters is based in Denver, Colorado.

== Symbols ==
Phi Sigma Rho's core values or pillars are Friendship, Scholarship, and Encouragement. Its motto is "Together we build the future."

The colors of Phi Sigma Rho are wine red and silver. The sorority's flower is the orchid. Its jewel is the pearl. Its mascot is Sigmand the penguin. Its online magazine is The Key.

== Philanthropy ==
Phi Sigma Rho's national philanthropy is Blood Cancer United.

The Phi Sigma Rho Foundation was established as a separate nonprofit organization in 2005. It supports the educational and philanthropic efforts of the sorority's members and offers merit-based scholarships to sorority members.

== Chapters ==
As of 2026, Phi Sigma Rho has chartered 54 chapters in the United States, with 47 being active.

== Notable members ==
- Lila Ibrahim, computer scientist and Google DeepMind's first chief operating officer

== See also ==
- List of social sororities and women's fraternities
- Society of Women Engineers
