= Roscoe George =

Roscoe George (9 December 1896 – 27 December 1975) was an American electrical engineer, inventor and educator known for his contributions to the development of television technology. He received his BS degree from Purdue University School of Electrical and Computer Engineering in 1922. After completing military service, he received his MS EE degree in 1927, also from Purdue. Roscoe married Rosa Smith on December 19, 1917.

George was a prolific inventor and was awarded over 30 patents. In 1929, he developed the first electronic television receiver. In 1931, Roscoe established W9XG, the first TV station in Indiana. In 1940, he received patents for his television system, method for viewing infrared images, and a cathode ray tube. George also developed a signal receiver circuit for aircraft and received a patent for this in 1946. In 1952, he developed a static eliminator for aircraft. He retired from Purdue in 1965 after a 45-year tenure.
