= Lila Ibrahim =

American computer scientist

Lila Ibrahim FREng
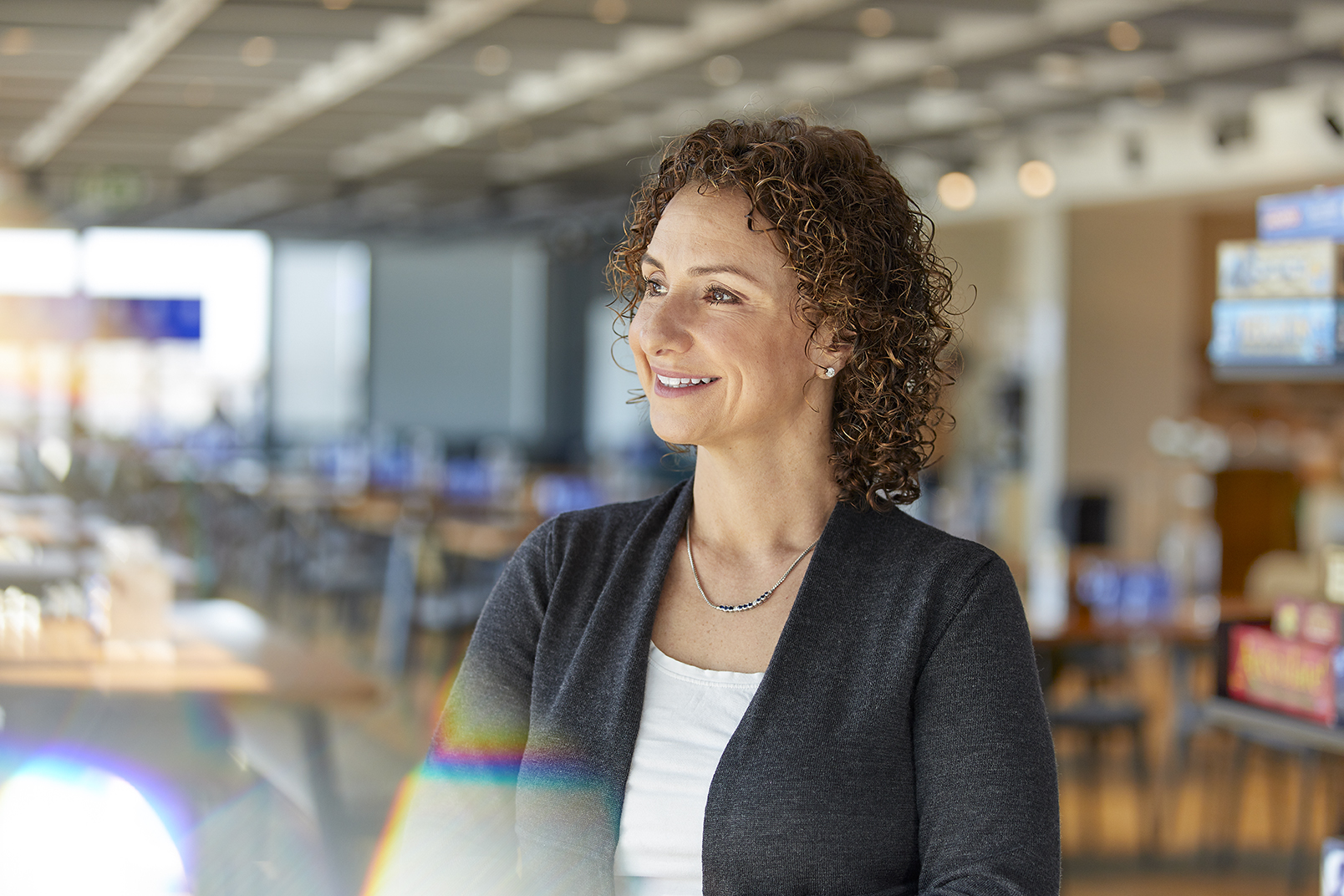
- Lila Ibrahim
- Born: 1969 or 1970 (age 56–57)
- Education: Electronic and Electrical Engineering, 1993
- Alma mater: Purdue University
- Employer: Google DeepMind

Lila Ibrahim is an American engineer and businesswoman. She was hired in 2018 as Google DeepMind's first chief operating officer.

Her previous roles include Chief Operations Officer at Coursera, Senior Operating Partner at Kleiner Perkins Caufield & Byers, and Chief of Staff to Intel CEO and Chairman Craig Barrett.

== Early life and education ==
Ibrahim's parents immigrated to the United States from Lebanon.

Ibrahim studied electrical and computer engineering at Purdue University. She earned her bachelor's degree in 1993. She was a member of the STEM sorority Phi Sigma Rho.

== Career ==
Ibrahim started in 1993 at Intel as a design engineer on the Pentium processor. During 18 years at Intel she held various technical, marketing, and leadership positions, including serving as Chief of Staff for Craig Barrett. As of 2010 she sat on the Global Council of Thunderbird School of Global Management.

Ibrahim was appointed Chief of Staff at venture capital firm Kleiner Perkins Caufield & Byers in 2010. Through Kleiner Perkins Caufield & Byers she began to work with Coursera. Ibrahim was made President of Coursera in 2013, later Chief Business and Operating Officer, and remained there until 2017. During this time she was appointed to the U.S. Secretary of Commerce's National Advisory Council on Innovation and Entrepreneurship.

In April 2018 Ibrahim was hired as the first Chief Operating Officer of DeepMind.

In 2023 Ibrahim and DeepMind founders Demis Hassabis and Shane Legg signed a Center for AI Safety statement declaring that "Mitigating the risk of extinction from AI should be a global priority alongside other societal-scale risks such as pandemics and nuclear war." According to Time, Ibrahim's duties at DeepMind include the management of that risk.

== Recognition ==
In 2007, Ibrahim was recognised by the World Economic Forum as a Young Global Leader. In 2009, she was featured on the cover of ForbesWoman for her role promoting women in technology. In 2010, she was awarded the Anita Borg Institute Women of Vision Award for Social Impact. In 2019, Ibrahim was named to Business Insider's list of Most Influential Leaders Shaping Business Tech in the UK and Most Interesting & Impactful Women in Tech in the UK. In 2023, she was included on Time's list of 100 Most Influential People in AI.

In 2026 she was elected a Fellow of the Royal Academy of Engineering.

== Personal life ==
Ibrahim is Lebanese-American. She has twin daughters.
