= Venkataramanan Balakrishnan =

Indian–American engineer

- Born: India

Academic background
- Education: B. Tech, IIT Madras; MS, electrical engineering, 1989, MS, statistics, 1992, PhD, electrical engineering, 1992, Stanford University
- Thesis: Global optimization in control system analysis and design (1992)

Venkataramanan "Ragu" Balakrishnan is an Indian–American engineer. He is the Charles H. Phipps Dean at the Case School of Engineering, having previously served as the Michael and Katherine Birck Head Professor of Electrical and Computer Engineering at Purdue University. In 2012, Balakrishnan was named a Fellow of the Institute of Electrical and Electronics Engineers (IEEE) for his contributions to convex optimization in control systems.

== Early life and education ==
Balakrishnan was born and raised in India. His father was a chemistry graduate who worked for a paper company while his sister works in computer systems. He received a Bachelor of Technology degree in Electronics and Communication Engineering from IIT Madras, receiving the President of India Gold Medal for academic excellence. He then travelled to the United States where he enrolled at Stanford University for his Master of Science (MS) degree in statistics followed by a M.S. and Ph.D. degrees in Electrical Engineering. Following his PhD, Balakrishnan conducted his postdoctoral research at the A. James Clark School of Engineering with Andre Tits. During this time, he focused on semi-definite programming and co-authored two papers: "Robustness under Bounded Uncertainty with Phase Information," and ISR Technical Report 97-23, "Absolute Stability Theory, Mu Theory and State-Space Verification of Frequency-Domain Conditions: Connections and Implications for Computation."

== Career ==
Following his postdoctoral research, Balakrishnan accepted an assistant professor position at Purdue University in 1994. He was quickly promoted to associate professor of electrical and computer engineering in 1998 and Full professor in 2003. Shortly following his promotion, Balakrishnan also became Purdue's assistant head for strategic initiatives and director of graduate admissions. In 2007, Balakrishnan was named associate dean for research in the College of Engineering. While serving as the associate dean, Balakrishnan was also named the Interim Head of the Purdue University School of Electrical and Computer Engineering (ECE). As the Interim Head of ECE, Balakrishnan was named a Fellow of the Institute of Electrical and Electronics Engineers (IEEE) for contributions to convex optimization in control systems. The following year, he was named the inaugural Michael and Katherine Birck Head of ECE.

In 2018, Balakrishnan left Purdue to become the Charles H. Phipps Dean at the Case School of Engineering.
