= Tellabs =

American technology company

- Type: Private
- Industry: Telecommunications equipment
- Founded: 1974
- Founder: Michael Birck
- Headquarters: Carrollton, Texas, United States
- Key people: CEO: Rich Schroder, President/CEO
- Products: Telecommunications equipment, local area network & network management
- Owner: Marlin Equity Partners
- Subsidiaries: Coherent Communications Systems Corp. Martis Oy
- Website: tellabs.com

Tellabs, Inc. is a global network technology company that provides networking and communications solutions to both private and governmental agencies. The company offers a range of products and services, including optical transport systems, access systems, managed access solutions, and network management software. The company was founded by Michael Birck in 1974 and is headquartered in Carrollton, Texas. It is currently owned by Marlin Equity Partners, who established an independent business for its product portfolio to accelerate the development of Optical local area network (OLAN) technology. Designed for enterprise and government clients, OLAN uses fiber, which is faster, more secure, and more stable compared to traditional copper infrastructure.

== History ==
=== Early years ===
Tellabs traces its roots to a meeting in 1974 over a kitchen table in suburban Chicago. According to company founder Michael Birck, a group of six men with backgrounds in electrical engineering and sales drank coffee and brainstormed ideas for a new telecom company. Their aim was to build a company that offered products and services tailored to customer needs. After raising $110,000 in capital, they incorporated as Tellabs in the spring of 1975; the name combined the idea of telephones and laboratories. The start-up only had a one-man research department, a second-hand soldering iron picked up for $25, and an outdated oscilloscope. In a matter of months, Tellabs began making echo suppressors, which suppress annoying echoes on phone calls. During this time, the founding partners drew no salaries.

The company went public in July 1980, ending the year with sales of $43.7 million. In September 1981, Tellabs introduced the industry's first echo canceller, an advance over the original echo suppressors that synthesized an echo and electronically subtracted it. By 1990, Tellabs had grown to 2,000 employees at 25 locations globally and sales of $211 million.

Tellabs made several acquisitions and expanded globally in the 1980s and into the 1990s, including Coherent Communications Systems Corp. and Martis Oy in Finland. In 1991, the company took a new direction, releasing its SONET-based TITAN 5500 digital cross-connect system. These systems switched traffic from one circuit to another, connecting traffic inside and between networks.

Richard Notebaert, who had led Ameritech, the Midwestern AT&T spin-off until it was acquired by SBC in 1999, took over Tellabs as CEO in September 2000. Pundits labeled Notebaert the “$6 billion man.” However, as the Chicago Sun-Times also reported, the telecom industry also collapsed. The Chicago Sun-Times reported: “Telecom went from boom to bust as venture capital dried up and customers cancelled orders for the sort of equipment made by Tellabs and its competitors, including Nortel Networks and Lucent Technologies.” In 2003, following industry trends and after 28 years as a manufacturer, Tellabs sold its last plant in Illinois and outsourced its manufacturing. The company continued downsizing.

=== 2003 to present ===
In 2003, Tellabs began offering residential Broadband PON in a partnership with Verizon FiOS. Krish Prabhu, former chief operating officer of Alcatel took over as CEO in February 2004. Prabhu saw opportunities as Internet usage grew demanding faster connections as well as video and better VoIP (Voice over Internet Protocol) calling. Tellabs acquired two companies in 2004. They purchased Advanced Fibre Communications (AFC), a provider of broadband access solutions with a customer base of more than 800 service providers worldwide at the time of the merger in a deal worth $1.9 billion and Marconi Communications North American Access, which sold fiber-access services to regional Bell operating companies and local exchange carriers. At the time of the merger, Marconi had a customer base that included many of the world's largest telecommunications operators, managing more than 4 million lines of capacity and about 1 million deployed lines. By 2007, nearly half of Tellabs' revenue came from products added since 2003.

Prabhu also presided over more cutbacks as the telecom industry continued to struggle. In January 2008, Tellabs announced that it was cutting 225 jobs during the year. This would leave Tellabs with about 3,500 jobs, down from a peak of 9,000 during the boom in 2001. Prabhu stepped down in March 2008 for personal reasons; Birck praised him at his departure. Tellabs internally promoted Robert W. Pullen, who had 23 years of varied experience at Tellabs, to succeed Prabhu as chief executive and president effective March 1, 2008. He was the chairman of the executive board of the Telecommunications Industry Association. In 2009 Tellabs acquired WiChorus, a San-Jose based Silicon Valley start-up with a mobile packet core platform, a decision that led to the decline of their data business. After Pullen was hospitalized in June 2012 due to cancer, Dan Kelly was appointed acting CEO and president; Kelly later assumed the full offices in November 2012, following Pullen's death. Kelly had previously served as executive vice president of global products and had worked with the company for over 25 years.

In 2013, Tellabs was acquired by Marlin Equity Partners, a global investment company. Marlin announced plans to establish an independent business for the Tellabs Access product portfolio, aiming to accelerate Tellabs' development of Optical local area network (OLAN) technology. Marlin announced it would target OLAN to Enterprise and Government agencies, while continuing to support and expand its Telecommunications portfolio. The Optical Transport, Metro Ethernet and Mobility business units of Tellabs were spun off into Coriant, a separate company owned by Marlin Equity. Mike Dagenais, an industry veteran who had previously served as CEO of Radisys Corporation and as president and CEO of Continuous Computing, was tapped to head Tellabs as president and CEO. The focus of Tellabs is now OLAN technology. OLAN uses fiber, which is faster, more secure, and more stable in comparison to traditional copper infrastructure. For service providers, Tellabs Access Platforms provide Broadband access to more than 5 million homes in North America. On October 11, 2017, it was announced that Jim Norrod had been named president and CEO of Tellabs, following the retirement of Mike Dagenais.

In December 2019, Tellabs announced that Rich Schroder had been appointed president and Chief Executive Officer. Mr. Schroder has held numerous positions within Tellabs and most recently served as Chief Operating Officer. Schroder is a telecom industry veteran with past experience running global multi-site organizations in Asia, Europe and across the U.S. on behalf of AFC, Marconi, RELTEC, DSC and Siemens.

== Corporate ==
Tellabs global corporate headquarters is located in the northwest quadrant of Dallas, Texas, in the city of Carrollton, Texas.

== Hardware ==
=== Optical Line Terminals ===
The optical line terminal provides centralized end-to-end LAN intelligence, management and control. It also provides aggregation and distribution functions and typically resides in the main data center of a building. An OLT has two primary functions. Converting the signal used by FiOS service providers to the frequency and framing being used in the PON system and coordinating the multiplexing between the conversion devices on the optical network terminals (ONTs) located on the customers' premises. Tellabs Optical Line Terminals minimize the physical space required within the main data center.

=== Optical Network Terminals ===
Tellabs designs Optical Network Terminals, aimed for use in high-volume passive optical network (PON) commercial deployments. Tellabs Optical Network Terminals provide narrowband and broadband subscriber services over a PON platform to the IP/Ethernet end-points; all services are supported natively over a single fiber, including analog voice, VoIP, high-speed data, IP video, RF video, smart buildings apps, security, surveillance, environmental and automation for modern high-performance LANs.

== Software ==
=== Element Management ===
Tellabs Panorama PON Manager is the cornerstone of an Optical LAN end-to-end system. It provides centralized intelligence and element management across the entire LAN, from OLT to ONT and extends to subtended powered devices. Tellabs describes its PON Manager as helping define LAN resources in software and then dynamically allocate them, based on real-time requirements.

=== Advanced Software Packages ===
Tellabs Optical LAN solution is designed to improve LAN availability uptime and increase operational efficiencies and network security. Tellabs offers multiple packages: Advanced Availability Software Package builds LANs that minimize annual network downtime while lowering costs, reducing human error, and improving security; Tellabs Advanced Operational Software Package improves IT efficiencies by increasing the speed of LAN configurations, monitoring, troubleshooting and MACs while once again reducing human error and network security risks; and Tellabs Advanced Security Software Package enhances physical LAN defensibility, enabling consistent protection policies that are centrally managed while continuing to reduce human error and increasing network stability.

== Services ==
Tellabs offers three services: Professional Network Services, which it describes as providing support at all stages of the network life cycle, Technical Support Services, which offers a variety of technical support agreement options to meet the specific needs of organization's network, and Network Training Services, which offers a variety of network training programs to keep staff up to date to support all phases of network's life cycle.
