= Mario Carillo =

Italian actor

- Born: Mario Caracciolo di Melito; 15 May 1883; Naples, Italy
- Died: 3 December 1958 (aged 75); Rome, Italy
- Occupation: Actor
- Years active: 1920–1930
- Spouse: Miriam Crosby (m. 1915)
- Parent(s): Filippo Caracciolo di Castagneto, Duke di Melito; Emilia Compagna dei Baroni Compagna

Mario Caracciolo dei Duchi di Melito (15 May 1883 – 3 December 1958), known professionally as Mario Carillo and in society events as Count Mario Caracciolo di Melito, was an Italian actor who worked in silent films in Hollywood in the 1920s.

== Biography ==
=== Origins ===
Mario was born as Nobile Mario Caracciolo dei Duchi [of the Dukes] di Melito (aka "Count" Mario Caracciolo di Melito) into the House of Caracciolo, a wealthy noble family in Naples, in 1883 (some sources claim his birth year as 1894). He was the cadet son of Filippo Caracciolo di Castagneto (1843-1904), 1st Duke di Melito, and wife the Duchess di Melito, born Donna Emilia Compagna dei Baroni [of the Barons] Compagna.

Mario served as an officer in the Italian cavalry before moving to the United States. He worked as an attaché at the Italian embassy in Washington, D.C., where he met and married Miriam Crosby in 1915. The pair had a son, Ludovico (1920-1941).

=== Hollywood career ===
Around 1920, he headed out to Hollywood alone to seek work as an actor. He also worked as a physiotherapist at the Los Angeles Athletic Club, where he met Rudolph Valentino. He also had a fling with a young actress named Lucille LeSueur (better by the stage name she took on later, Joan Crawford). Over the course of the decade, he appeared in several dozen films before returning to Italy with the aim of starting his own production company (it does not appear that he was successful in this endeavor).

=== Later life ===
Mario died in Rome, Italy, on 3 December 1958; he was survived by his wife.

There appears to be a case of mistaken identity at the heart of stories in the press that he was the Mario Caracciolo who was given supreme command of the Italian army's technical service by Mussolini during World War II. This man's full name appears to have been named Mario Caracciolo di Feroleto; the two were around the same age.

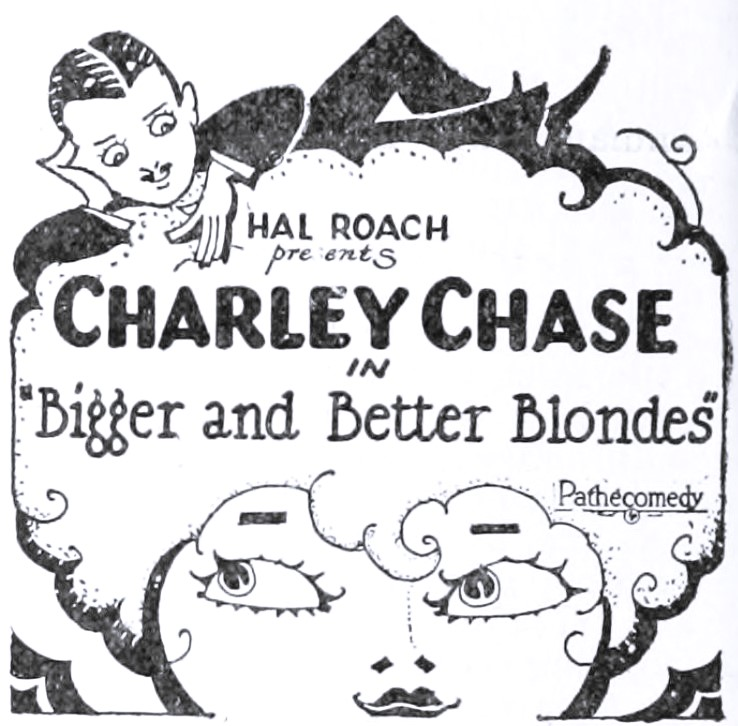
Bigger and Better Blondes (1927)

== Partial filmography ==
- A Stage Romance (1922)
- The Snitching Hour (1922)
- Slim Shoulders (1922)
- Queen of the Moulin Rouge (1922)
- The Prisoner (1923)
- The Remittance Woman (1923)
- Rosita (1923)
- The Song of Love (1923)
- Stepping Lively (1924)
- His Hour (1924)
- Eve's Secret (1925)
- Déclassé (1925)
- Lost: A Wife (1925)
- Her Sister from Paris (1925)
- The Eagle (1925)
- The Only Thing (1925)
- The Lure of the Wild (1925)
- Dance Madness (1926)
- The Girl from Montmartre (1926)
- Torrent (1926)
- The Barrier (1926)
- Don Juan's 3 Nights (1926)
- Diplomacy (1926)
- Perch of the Devil (1927)
- Evening Clothes (1927)
- Venus of Venice (1927)
- Bigger and Better Blondes (1927)
- Time to Love (1927)
- Ladies Beware (1927)
- The Private Life of Helen of Troy (1927)
- His Tiger Wife (1928)
- How to Handle Women (1928)
- Hot News (1928)
- Just Married (1928)
