= Michael Birck =

American businessman (1938–2015)

Michael J. Birck (January 25, 1938 – July 6, 2015) was a co-founder and chairman of Tellabs Inc. He began his career at Bell Telephone Laboratories, and helped found Tellabs in 1975. He was the CEO of the company from 2002 to 2004. He was a member of the Alumni Association at Purdue University.

== Biography ==
Birck was born January 25, 1938, in Missoula, Montana, and grew up in Clinton, Indiana. He received a BSEE degree at Purdue University in 1960 and an MSEE degree from New York University in 1962.

Birck began his career on the technical staff at AT&T’s Bell Telephone Laboratories. He went on to manage the Transmission System Design Department at Continental Telephone Laboratories. He was director of engineering at Wescom Inc. from 1968 to 1975. Birck and five other electrical engineers and salesmen came up with the idea for Tellabs in 1975. He was Chief Executive Officer of Tellabs from 2002 to 2004.

Birck died on July 6, 2015 at the age of 77.

== Sports endeavors ==
Birck came to the public's attention in 1999 when the Chicago Bears football team appeared to be up for sale. A radio show host on WSCR made the suggestion that Birck should buy the team. Birck told the Chicago Sun-Times: "It was kind of amusing. Some guy on The Score said, 'How about that Mike Birck guy? He ought to be able to buy the Bears.'" Birck decided not to buy the team.

Birck was pitcher at Purdue University. He funded the Birck Boilermaker Golf Complex, named after him by Purdue University, and donated $5 million to the renovation of the University’s Mackey Arena in 2008. Birck has also made contributions to Purdue University, Benedictine University, Loyola University, and Hinsdale Hospital, among others.

== Academic endeavors ==
Birck is past chairman of the Purdue Alumni Foundation Board and is a trustee of Purdue University. He was a director at the Purdue Research Foundation and was on the Dean’s Advisory Council of the Krannert School of Management. He is a member of the Board of Trustees of Benedictine University and of the Illinois Mathematics and Science Academy Fund Board.

== Honors ==
He was inducted into the Chicago Business Hall of Fame in 1998 and received the Chicago Area Entrepreneurship Hall of Fame Lifetime Achievement Award in 1999.

He was honored as a 2001 recipient of the IEEE Ernst Weber Engineering Leadership Recognition award. In 2003, the Electronic Industries Alliance presented him with the Medal of Honor Award for his achievements and leadership in the U.S. telecommunications industry.

Purdue and Benedictine University have awarded him honorary doctorate degrees. He received the Illinois High Tech Entrepreneur award from Peat Marwick and Mitchell/Crain’s Chicago Business in 1984 and the Outstanding Master Entrepreneur award by Inc. Magazine and Ernst & Young in 1995.
