= List of members of the National Academy of Sciences (engineering sciences) =

This list is a subsection of the List of members of the National Academy of Sciences, which includes more than 7,000 members and international members of the United States National Academy of Sciences, both living and deceased, each affiliated with one of 31 disciplinary sections. Members are listed under their primary section, and each person's name, primary institution, and election year are given. For deceased members, the year of death is noted. The designation (d) after the name means the member is deceased.

| Name | Institution | Year |
|---|---|---|
| Jan Achenbach (died 2020) | Northwestern University | 1992 |
| Andreas Acrivos (died 2025) | City College of the City University of New York | 1991 |
| Zhores Alferov (died 2019) | Russian Academy of Sciences | 1990 |
| Neal Amundson (died 2011) | University of Houston | 1992 |
| Kristi S. Anseth | University of Colorado Boulder | 2013 |
| Frances Arnold | California Institute of Technology | 2008 |
| Bishnu Atal | University of Washington | 1993 |
| David Auston | University of California, Santa Barbara | 1991 |
| Chunli Bai | Chinese Academy of Sciences | 2006 |
| Anna C. Balazs | University of Pittsburgh | 2021 |
| Zhenan Bao | Stanford University | 2024 |
| George K. Batchelor (died 2000) | University of Cambridge | 1994 |
| Frank S. Bates | University of Minnesota | 2017 |
| Zdeněk Bažant | Northwestern University | 2002 |
| Angela M. Belcher | Massachusetts Institute of Technology | 2022 |
| Alexis T. Bell | University of California, Berkeley | 2010 |
| Ted B. Belytschko (died 2014) | Northwestern University | 2011 |
| Manson Benedict (died 2006) | Massachusetts Institute of Technology | 1956 |
| Sangeeta N. Bhatia | Massachusetts Institute of Technology | 2017 |
| R. Byron Bird (died 2020) | University of Wisconsin–Madison | 1989 |
| Raymond L. Bisplinghoff (died 1985) | Tyco Laboratories, Inc. | 1967 |
| John F. Brady | California Institute of Technology | 2020 |
| Leonid Brekhovskikh (died 2005) | Russian Academy of Sciences | 1991 |
| Howard Brenner (died 2014) | Massachusetts Institute of Technology | 2000 |
| William Bridges (died 2024) | California Institute of Technology | 1981 |
| Lyman Briggs Jr. (died 1963) | National Bureau of Standards | 1942 |
| C. Jeffrey Brinker | The University of New Mexico | 2021 |
| Norman Brooks | California Institute of Technology | 1981 |
| Harold Brown (died 2019) | Center for Strategic and International Studies | 1977 |
| Robert A. Brown | Boston University | 2001 |
| Walter Brown (died 2017) | Lehigh University | 1986 |
| Arthur E. Bryson | Stanford University | 1973 |
| Solomon J. Buchsbaum (died 1993) | AT&T Bell Laboratories | 1974 |
| Bernard Budiansky (died 1999) | Harvard University | 1973 |
| Robert Byer | Stanford University | 2000 |
| Hui Cao | Yale University | 2021 |
| Federico Capasso | Harvard University | 1995 |
| Gang Chen | Massachusetts Institute of Technology | 2023 |
| Shu Chien | University of California, San Diego | 2005 |
| Sallie W. Chisholm | Massachusetts Institute of Technology | 2003 |
| Alfred Y. Cho | Nokia Bell Labs | 1985 |
| Marvin Chodorow (died 2005) | Stanford University | 1971 |
| Ray Clough (died 2016) | Independent Consultant | 1979 |
| James J. Collins | Massachusetts Institute of Technology | 2014 |
| Samuel C. Collins (died 1984) | Massachusetts Institute of Technology | 1969 |
| Stephen Crandall (died 2013) | Massachusetts Institute of Technology | 1993 |
| Yi Cui | Stanford University | 2022 |
| C. Chapin Cutler (died 2002) | Stanford University | 1976 |
| Sidney Darlington (died 1997) | University of New Hampshire | 1978 |
| Supriyo Datta | Purdue University | 2024 |
| Mark E. Davis | California Institute of Technology | 2006 |
| Stephen H. Davis (died 2021) | Northwestern University | 2004 |
| Pablo G. Debenedetti | Princeton University | 2012 |
| Don Deere (died 2018) | Independent Consultant | 1971 |
| Anthony DeMaria (died 2025) | Coherent, Inc. | 1997 |
| Jacob P. Den Hartog (died 1989) | Massachusetts Institute of Technology | 1953 |
| Charles S. Draper (died 1987) | Draper Laboratory | 1957 |
| Mildred Dresselhaus (died 2017) | Massachusetts Institute of Technology | 1985 |
| Charles B. Duke (died 2019) | Xerox Corporation | 2001 |
| James A. Dumesic | University of Wisconsin–Madison | 2014 |
| Floyd Dunn (died 2015) | University of Illinois at Urbana–Champaign | 1990 |
| Harold E. Edgerton (died 1990) | Massachusetts Institute of Technology | 1964 |
| Jennifer Hartt Elisseeff | Johns Hopkins University | 2023 |
| Howard W. Emmons (died 1998) | Harvard University | 1966 |
| Leo Esaki | Yokohama College of Pharmacy | 1976 |
| Anthony G. Evans (died 2009) | University of California, Santa Barbara | 2005 |
| Shanhui Fan | Stanford University | 2025 |
| Martin M. Fejer | Stanford University | 2016 |
| Stephen R. Forrest | University of Michigan | 2016 |
| T. Kenneth Fowler | University of California, Berkeley | 1987 |
| Lambert B. Freund (died 2024) | Brown University | 1997 |
| Glenn H. Fredrickson | University of California, Santa Barbara | 2021 |
| James G. Fujimoto | Massachusetts Institute of Technology | 2006 |
| Yuan-Cheng Fung (died 2019) | University of California, San Diego | 1992 |
| Harold P. Furth (died 2002) | Princeton University | 1976 |
| Huajian Gao | Tsinghua University | 2018 |
| James F. Gibbons | Stanford University | 1985 |
| Robert R. Gilruth (died 2000) | National Aeronautics and Space Administration | 1974 |
| Edward L. Ginzton (died 1998) | Varian Associates | 1966 |
| James Gordon (died 2013) | Lucent Technologies | 1988 |
| Roy Gould (died 2022) | California Institute of Technology | 1974 |
| Steve Granick | University of Massachusetts at Amherst | 2015 |
| Crawford Greenewalt (died 1993) | DuPont Company | 1952 |
| Julia R. Greer | California Institute of Technology | 2025 |
| Vladimir Haensel (died 2002) | University of Massachusetts at Amherst | 1971 |
| Paula T. Hammond | Massachusetts Institute of Technology | 2019 |
| N. Bruce Hannay (died 1996) | AT&T Bell Laboratories | 1977 |
| Thomas Hanratty (died 2016) | University of Illinois at Urbana–Champaign | 1999 |
| Cyril M. Harris (died 2011) | Columbia University | 1980 |
| Stephen Harris | Stanford University | 1981 |
| Hermann A. Haus (died 2003) | Massachusetts Institute of Technology | 1987 |
| William Hawthorne (died 2011) | Massachusetts Institute of Technology | 1965 |
| Karl Hess | University of Illinois Urbana-Champaign | 2003 |
| William R. Hewlett (died 2001) | Hewlett-Packard Company | 1977 |
| John P. Hirth | Washington State University | 1994 |
| Nick Holonyak Jr. (died 2022) | University of Illinois at Urbana–Champaign | 1984 |
| Hoyt C. Hottel (died 1998) | Massachusetts Institute of Technology | 1963 |
| George Housner (died 2008) | California Institute of Technology | 1972 |
| Evelyn L. Hu | Harvard University | 2008 |
| Yonggang Huang | Northwestern University | 2020 |
| Jeffrey Alan Hubbell | New York University | 2023 |
| Thomas J. R. Hughes | The University of Texas at Austin | 2009 |
| Jerome C. Hunsaker (died 1984) | Massachusetts Institute of Technology | 1935 |
| John W. Hutchinson | Harvard University | 1990 |
| Klavs F. Jensen | Massachusetts Institute of Technology | 2017 |
| Clarence L. Johnson (died 1990) | Lockheed Corporation | 1965 |
| William L. Johnson | California Institute of Technology | 2007 |
| Robert T. Jones (died 1999) | Stanford University | 1981 |
| Sumio Iijima | Meijo University | 2007 |
| Hiroshi Inose (died 2000) | National Institute of Informatics | 1977 |
| Erich P. Ippen | Massachusetts Institute of Technology | 1985 |
| Jacob Israelachvili (died 2018) | University of California, Santa Barbara | 2004 |
| Rakesh K. Jain | Harvard Medical School | 2009 |
| Zay Jeffries (died 1965) | General Electric Company | 1939 |
| Daniel Joseph (died 2011) | University of Minnesota, Minneapolis | 1991 |
| Wolfgang Kaiser (died 2023) | Technical University of Munich | 1989 |
| Ursula Keller | ETH Zürich | 2021 |
| Augustus B. Kinzel (died 1987) | Union Carbide Corporation | 1960 |
| Herwig Kogelnik | Nokia Bell Labs | 1994 |
| Robert A. Laudise (died 1998) | Lucent Technologies | 1991 |
| Cato T. Laurencin | University of Connecticut | 2021 |
| Sang Yup Lee | KAIST (Korea Advanced Institute of Science & Technology) | 2017 |
| Johanna Levelt Sengers (died 2024) | National Institute of Standards and Technology | 1996 |
| Jennifer A. Lewis | Harvard University | 2018 |
| Aizhen Li | Chinese Academy of Sciences | 2007 |
| J. C. R. Licklider (died 1990) | Massachusetts Institute of Technology | 1969 |
| Edwin Lightfoot (died 2017) | University of Wisconsin–Madison | 1995 |
| Arunava Majumdar | Stanford University | 2020 |
| Robert W. Mann (died 2006) | Massachusetts Institute of Technology | 1982 |
| Frank Marble (died 2014) | California Institute of Technology | 1989 |
| Max Mathews (died 2011) | Stanford University | 1975 |
| Kenneth McKay (died 2010) | AT&T Corporation | 1976 |
| Carver Mead | California Institute of Technology | 1989 |
| Robert Mehl (died 1976) | Naval Research Laboratory | 1958 |
| David A.B. Miller | Stanford University | 2008 |
| James Mitchell (died 2023) | Virginia Polytechnic Institute and State University | 1998 |
| John Moll (died 2011) | Hewlett-Packard Company | 1986 |
| H. Keith Moffatt | University of Cambridge | 2008 |
| Parviz Moin | Stanford University | 2011 |
| Roddam Narasimha (died 2020) | Jawaharlal Nehru Centre for Advanced Scientific Research | 2000 |
| Jens Bredal Nielsen | BioInnovation Institute | 2019 |
| William Nix | Stanford University | 2003 |
| Robert N. Noyce (died 1990) | SEMATECH | 1980 |
| Bernard M. Oliver (died 1995) | Hewlett-Packard Company | 1973 |
| Egon Orowan (died 1989) | Massachusetts Institute of Technology | 1969 |
| Julio M. Ottino | Northwestern University | 2022 |
| Morton Panish | AT&T Bell Laboratories | 1987 |
| Stuart S. P. Parkin | Max Planck Institute of Microstructure Physics | 2008 |
| C. Kumar Patel | Bell Laboratories | 1974 |
| Gerald L. Pearson (died 1987) | Stanford University | 1970 |
| Donald O. Pederson (died 2004) | University of California, Berkeley | 1982 |
| Michael Phelps | David Geffen School of Medicine at UCLA | 1999 |
| William H. Pickering (died 2004) | Lignetics, Inc. | 1962 |
| John R. Pierce (died 2002) | Stanford University | 1955 |
| Robert L. Pigford (died 1988) | University of Delaware | 1972 |
| E. R. Piore (died 2000) | International Business Machines Corporation | 1963 |
| H. Vincent Poor | Princeton University | 2011 |
| John Prausnitz | University of California, Berkeley | 1973 |
| Ronald Probstein (died 2021) | Massachusetts Institute of Technology | 1999 |
| Allen Puckett (died 2014) | Hughes Electronics Corporation | 1974 |
| Calvin Quate (died 2019) | Stanford University | 1975 |
| Simon Ramo (died 2016) | TRW Inc. | 1973 |
| Ramamoorthy Ramesh | University of California, Berkeley | 2024 |
| Norman C. Rasmussen (died 2003) | Massachusetts Institute of Technology | 1979 |
| Arthur E. Raymond (died 1999) | McDonnell Douglas Corporation | 1950 |
| Rebecca R. Richards-Kortum | Rice University | 2015 |
| Robert O. Ritchie | University of California, Berkeley | 2025 |
| John A. Rogers | Northwestern University | 2015 |
| Ares J. Rosakis | California Institute of Technology | 2016 |
| Emilio Rosenblueth (died 1994) | Universidad Nacional Autonoma de Mexico | 1970 |
| Anatol Roshko (died 2017) | California Institute of Technology | 2002 |
| Ian M. Ross (died 2013) | AT&T Corporation | 1982 |
| Maurice Roy (died 1985) | ONERA | 1964 |
| George S. Schairer (died 2004) | The Boeing Company | 1968 |
| William Schowalter | Princeton University | 1998 |
| Marlan Scully | Texas A&M University-College Station | 2001 |
| William R. Sears (died 2002) | University of Arizona | 1974 |
| H. Bolton Seed (died 1989) | University of California, Berkeley | 1986 |
| Mordechai (Moti) Segev | Technion-Israel Institute of Technology | 2015 |
| John H. Seinfeld | California Institute of Technology | 2013 |
| William Sellers (died 1905) | William Sellers & Co. | 1873 |
| Charles V. Shank | Howard Hughes Medical Institute | 1984 |
| Dan Shechtman | Technion-Israel Institute of Technology | 2023 |
| William Shockley (died 1989) | Stanford University | 1951 |
| Anthony Siegman (died 2011) | Stanford University | 1988 |
| Joseph Slepian (died 1969) | Westinghouse Electric | 1941 |
| C. Richard Soderberg (died 1979) | Massachusetts Institute of Technology | 1947 |
| Nancy R. Sottos | University of Illinois Urbana-Champaign | 2022 |
| Philip Sporn (died 1978) | American Electric Power Company, Inc. | 1962 |
| Katepalli R. Sreenivasan | New York University | 2007 |
| Kenneth Stevens (died 2013) | Massachusetts Institute of Technology | 1998 |
| Guyford Stever (died 2010) | Independent Consultant | 1973 |
| Howard A. Stone | Princeton University | 2014 |
| Julius A. Stratton (died 1994) | Massachusetts Institute of Technology | 1952 |
| Donna T. Strickland | University of Waterloo | 2020 |
| Chauncey Guy Suits (died 1991) | General Electric Company | 1946 |
| Zhigang Suo | Harvard University | 2019 |
| Subra Suresh | Massachusetts Institute of Technology | 2012 |
| Frederick E. Terman (died 1982) | Stanford University | 1946 |
| Ping Tien (died 2017) | Bell Laboratories, Lucent Technologies | 1978 |
| Matthew V. Tirrell | The University of Chicago | 2019 |
| Viola Vogel | ETH Zürich | 2021 |
| Ernst Weber (died 1996) | Harris Corporation | 1965 |
| Sheldon Weinbaum | City College of the City University of New York | 2002 |
| John Whinnery (died 2009) | University of California, Berkeley | 1972 |
| Jerome B. Wiesner (died 1994) | Massachusetts Institute of Technology | 1960 |
| Abel Wolman (died 1989) | Johns Hopkins University School of Medicine | 1963 |
| Dean Wooldridge (died 2006) | TRW Inc. | 1969 |
| Eli Yablonovitch | University of California, Berkeley | 2003 |
| Amnon Yariv | California Institute of Technology | 1991 |
| Walter H. Zinn (died 2000) | Combustion Engineering, Inc. | 1956 |
| Vladimir K. Zworykin (died 1982) | RCA Corporation | 1943 |
