= Mohammed A. Zikry =

American engineer

- Education: University of Kansas (BS); Johns Hopkins University (MS); University of California, San Diego (PhD)
- Known for: Micromechanics modeling; dislocation-density-based crystalline constitutive formulations
- Awards: Robert Henry Thurston Lecture Award (2017); Jefferson Science Fellowship; Fulbright Senior Research Award
- Scientific career
- Fields: Mechanical engineering Mechanics of materials Computational mechanics
- Workplaces: North Carolina State University

Mohammed A. Zikry is an American mechanical engineer and academic. He is the Zan Prevost Smith Professor in the Department of Mechanical and Aerospace Engineering at North Carolina State University, where his research focuses on the mechanics of materials, computational and multiscale modeling, and the failure behavior of crystalline and heterogeneous materials. He is best known as the recipient of the 2017 Robert Henry Thurston Lecture Award from the American Society of Mechanical Engineers (ASME).

== Education ==
Zikry received a Bachelor of Science in mechanical engineering from the University of Kansas in 1983, a Master of Science in mechanical engineering with a specialization in solid mechanics from Johns Hopkins University in 1986, and a Ph.D. in applied mechanics from the University of California, San Diego in 1990.

== Career and research ==
Zikry is the Zan Prevost Smith Professor at North Carolina State University. His research centers on multiscale modeling and mechanics, failure models for ductile and brittle systems, the dynamic behavior of structures and materials, experimental solid mechanics, and micromechanics. He is regarded as a leader in micromechanics modeling, having developed three-dimensional, dislocation-density-based crystalline constitutive formulations and computational schemes that account for microstructural effects such as grain-boundary orientation, grain size, and slip transmission in polycrystalline aggregates.

He served as Editor-in-Chief of the ASME Journal of Engineering Materials and Technology and has held editorial roles with other journals. He has also chaired the ASME's Materials Division and acted as a senior research advisor to the U.S. Army Research Office and the Department of Defense.

== Robert Henry Thurston Lecture Award ==
In 2017, Zikry was named the recipient of the Robert Henry Thurston Lecture Award, one of ASME's most distinguished honors. He was cited for pioneering contributions to the mechanics of materials, computational mechanics, multiscale modeling, and materials science.

The Thurston Lecture Award is the oldest named lectureship in mechanical engineering, with a single recipient named each year except for a hiatus during World War II. It was established in 1925 in honor of Robert Henry Thurston, the first president of ASME, and is presented annually to a leader in pure or applied science or engineering, who delivers the Thurston Lecture as a plenary address at the ASME International Mechanical Engineering Congress and Exposition (IMECE). The lectureship was elevated to a Society-level award in 2000. As ASME's lone society-level lectureship, the award places Zikry among a select group of recipients that includes Nobel laureate Jack Kilby and National Medal of Science recipients Theodore von Kármán and Yuan-Cheng Fung. Zikry delivered his lecture at the 2017 ASME IMECE conference in Tampa, Florida.

== Honors and awards ==
In addition to the Thurston Lecture Award, Zikry has received the Jefferson Science Fellowship as a senior science advisor to the U.S. State Department, Senior Research Fulbright Awards to Egypt and France, the Alcoa Foundation Distinguished Research Award, the Society of Automotive Engineers (SAE) Ralph Teetor Educational Award, and North Carolina State University's R.J. Reynolds Award for Excellence in Teaching, Research and Extension. He is a Fellow of ASME, the American Association for the Advancement of Science (AAAS), and the Society of Engineering Science (SES).
