= Paul Cooper (mechanical engineer) =

American mechanical engineer specializing in pump hydraulics and cavitation

- Education: Drexel University (B.S., 1957); Massachusetts Institute of Technology (M.S., 1959); Case Western Reserve University (Ph.D., 1972)
- Engineering career
- Discipline: Mechanical engineering
- Institutions: American Society of Mechanical Engineers (Life Fellow)
- Employer(s): TRW Inc. Ingersoll-Rand / Ingersoll-Dresser Pump Company (now part of Flowserve); Fluid Machinery Research, Inc.
- Projects: Analysis of single- and two-phase flow in turbopump inducers; computational fluid dynamics of centrifugal pumps; Pump Handbook
- Awards: ASME Fluid Machinery Design Award (1991); Henry R. Worthington Medal (1993); ASME Robert Henry Thurston Lecture Award (1995); ASME Fluids Engineering Award (2002)

Paul Cooper is an American mechanical engineer known for his work on the hydraulics of pumps, particularly the analysis of cavitation and two-phase flow in inducers, the application of computational fluid dynamics (CFD) to centrifugal pump design, and his role as a co-editor of the McGraw-Hill Pump Handbook. A Life Fellow of the American Society of Mechanical Engineers (ASME), he served as chair of ASME's Fluids Engineering Division (1985-1986) and received the society's Henry R. Worthington Medal for achievement in the field of pumping machinery. In 1995 he delivered ASME's Robert Henry Thurston Lecture, mechanical engineering's oldest lectureship, established in 1925 in honor of ASME's first president.

== Education ==
Cooper received a B.S. in mechanical engineering from Drexel University in 1957 and an M.S. in mechanical engineering from the Massachusetts Institute of Technology in 1959. He earned a Ph.D. in engineering from Case Western Reserve University in 1972.

== Career ==
Cooper began his career at TRW Inc., where he performed hydraulic design of fuel pumps and inducers for aerospace applications, as well as submersible centrifugal pumps for the oil field. While at TRW he published a 1967 analysis of single- and two-phase flows in turbopump inducers, a numerical treatment of cavitating flow that accounted for the thermodynamic effects of vaporization.

In 1977, Cooper joined the Ingersoll-Rand research center in Princeton, New Jersey, where he researched pumps and turbines. He subsequently served as director of research and development Ingersoll-Dresser Pump Company (later part of the Flowserve Corporation), directing work on pump hydraulics and cavitation. At Ingersoll-Dresser he and colleagues were early adopters of commercial CFD codes for pump design; their 1994 study computed suction and discharge recirculation in a centrifugal pump impeller across a wide flow range and used the results to design an impeller with smoother minimum-flow operation.

Cooper retired from Ingersoll-Dresser in 1999 after 22 years and became a consultant with Fluid Machinery Research, Inc., in Titusville, New Jersey. His later work has concentrated on multiphase pumping, with emphasis on the design and performance prediction of twin-screw pumps.

Within ASME, Cooper chaired the Pumping Machinery Committee (later the Fluid Machinery Committee) from 1978-1980 and chaired the Fluids Engineering Division Executive Committee in 1985-1986. Cooper was among the group of pump technologists assembled at the Texas A&M University Turbomachinery Laboratory in 1983 whose advisory committee organized the first International Pump Symposium (held in Houston in 1984), and he remained involved with the institution, now the International Pump Users Symposium.

=== Pump Handbook ===
Cooper is a co-editor, with Igor Karassik, Joseph P. Messina, and Charles C. Heald, of the fourth edition of McGraw-Hill's Pump Handbook (2008), a standard reference work on pump theory, design, and application.

== Thurston Lecture ==
In 1995 Cooper was selected to deliver the Robert Henry Thurston Lecture of the American Society of Mechanical Engineers. Established in 1925 in honor of Robert Henry Thurston, the first president of ASME, the lectureship provides an opportunity for a leader in pure or applied science or engineering to present to the society a lecture on a subject of broad interest to engineers.

== Awards and honors ==
- Life Fellow, American Society of Mechanical Engineers
- ASME Fluid Machinery Design Award (1991), for excellence in the design of fluid machinery involving significant fluid mechanics principles
- Henry R. Worthington Medal (1993), for eminent achievement in the field of pumping machinery
- ASME Robert Henry Thurston Lecture Award (1995)
- ASME Fluids Engineering Award (2002), for outstanding contributions over a period of years to the engineering profession, especially in the field of fluids engineering

== Selected publications ==
- Cooper, Paul (1967). "Analysis of Single- and Two-Phase Flows in Turbopump Inducers". Journal of Engineering for Power. 89 (4). ASME: 577–588. doi:10.1115/1.3616742.
- Cooper, Paul; Graf, Edward; Luce, Timothy (1994). "Computational Fluid Dynamical Analysis of Complex Internal Flows in Centrifugal Pumps". Proceedings of the Eleventh International Pump Users Symposium. College Station, Texas: Turbomachinery Laboratory, Texas A&M University. pp. 83–94. hdl:1969.1/164206.
- Karassik, Igor J.; Messina, Joseph P.; Cooper, Paul; Heald, Charles C., eds. (2008). Pump Handbook (4th ed.). New York: McGraw-Hill. ISBN 978-0-07-146044-6.
- Cooper, Paul (2009). "25 Years of Driving Pump Technology: The Contribution of the Pump Symposium". Proceedings of the Twenty-Fifth International Pump Users Symposium. College Station, Texas: Turbomachinery Laboratory, Texas A&M University. pp. 145–150. hdl:1969.1/163907.
- Cooper, Paul; Martin, C. Samuel; O'Hern, Timothy J. (2016). "History of the Fluids Engineering Division". Journal of Fluids Engineering. 138 (10): 100801. doi:10.1115/1.4033976.
