= Hipwell =

Hipwell is an English surname. Notable people with the surname include:

- Cynthia Hipwell, American mechanical engineer
- James Hipwell, British journalist, formerly with the Daily Mirror
- John Hipwell, Australian rugby union player
- John Hipwell (architect) (1920–2007), Australian architect
- Mike Hipwell, Ireland rugby union player
