= Robert McMeeking =

Scottish-born engineer (born 1950)

Robert M. McMeeking
- Born: May 22, 1950 (age 76); Glasgow, Scotland
- Awards: Timoshenko Medal; William Prager Medal

Academic background
- Education: Allan Glen's School
- Alma mater: University of Glasgow; Brown University
- Doctoral advisor: James R. Rice

Academic work
- Institutions: UC Santa Barbara

Robert Maxwell McMeeking (born May 22, 1950) is a Scottish-born engineer. He is currently Tony Evans Distinguished Professor of Structural Materials and of Mechanical Engineering at the University of California, Santa Barbara. McMeeking has been widely recognized for his contributions to applied mechanics for which was awarded the 2014 Timoshenko Medal. He is a fellow of the Royal Society of Edinburgh, National Academy of Engineering and American Society of Mechanical Engineers.

== Early life and education ==
Robert Maxwell McMeeking was born on May 22, 1950, in Glasgow, Scotland. After graduating from Allan Glen's School, he attended the University of Glasgow, earning a Bachelor of Science in 1972. At the university, he studied under Ian Sneddon; Sneddon recommended McMeeking pursue graduate studies at Brown University, where James R. Rice was teaching at the time. McMeeking earned a M.Sc. and Ph.D. at Brown University in 1974 and 1977, respectively, under the direction of Rice.

== Career ==
McMeeking held positions at Stanford University and the University of Illinois Urbana-Champaign before joining the faculty of the University of California, Santa Barbara in 1985. From 1992 to 1995 and 1999 to 2003, McMeeking chaired the university's Department of Mechanical and Environmental Engineering. In 2015, he was named the inaugural Tony Evans Chair in Structural Materials.

In 2014, McMeeking received the Timoshenko Medal in recognition of his "pioneering contributions to broad areas of applied mechanics." The same year, he was elected a Fellow of the Royal Society of Edinburgh for “significant contributions in the understanding of how complex materials deform and break and for advancing fundamental engineering knowledge.” He is a member of the National Academy of Engineering and a fellow of the American Society of Mechanical Engineers.

== Honors and awards ==
- 2015, William Prager Medal, Society of Engineering Science
- 2014, Timoshenko Medal, American Society of Mechanical Engineers
- 2007, Brown Engineering Alumni Medal, Brown University School of Engineering
- 2005, Elected member, National Academy of Engineering
- 2004, Alexander von Humboldt Research Award for Senior U.S. Scientists
- 1998, Elected fellow, American Society of Mechanical Engineers
