= Stephen H. Crandall =

Stephen Harry Crandall (December 2, 1920 – October 29, 2013) was a professor of mechanical engineering at MIT. He earned his master's degree in engineering at Stevens Institute of Technology in Hoboken, New Jersey and his Ph.D. from MIT. He joined the MIT faculty in 1946 and taught dynamics and strength of materials until his retirement in 1991. He was a prolific author of texts in solid mechanics, numerical methods, and random vibration. His mentor at MIT was J. P. Den Hartog. He was awarded the American Society of Mechanical Engineers (ASME) Robert Henry Thurston Lecture Award in 1988 and the ASME Timoshenko Medal in 1990 "in recognition of distinguished contributions to the field of applied mechanics." He was elected to the National Academy of Sciences in 1993.

== Publications ==
Crandall, Stephen H., Dahl, Norman C. -Editors, An Introduction to Mechanics of Solids, McGraw-Hill Book Company, New York, (1959)

Crandall, Stephen H., Engineering Analysis. A Survey of Numerical Procedures, ISBN 978-0-07-013430-0 ISBN 0070134308, (1956)

Crandall, Stephen H., Random Vibration, MIT PRESS, ISBN 978-1-124-06977-7, (1959)
