= Robert Henry Thurston Lecture Award =

American Society of Mechanical Engineers lectureship and award

- Description: A lecture on a subject of broad interest to engineers, delivered by a leader in pure or applied science or engineering
- Country: United States
- Presented by: American Society of Mechanical Engineers (ASME)
- First award: 1925; 101 years ago
- Website: www.asme.org/about-asme/honors-awards/achievement-awards/robert-henry-thurston-lecture-award

The Robert Henry Thurston Lecture Award (Thurston Award or Thurston Lecture) is an honor of the American Society of Mechanical Engineers (ASME) and the oldest named lectureship in mechanical engineering. Established in 1925, it is named in honor of Robert Henry Thurston, the first president of ASME, and is awarded each year to a leader in pure and/or applied science or engineering to deliver a lecture on a subject of broad interest to engineers. It is the only award administered directly by ASME's central scientific body, the Technical and Engineering Communities Sector, and the recipient delivers the Thurston Lecture as the main plenary lecture at the ASME International Mechanical Engineering Congress and Exposition (IMECE).

== History ==
The lectureship was established in 1925 in honor of Robert Henry Thurston (1839–1903), who served as the first president of ASME. The inaugural lecture was delivered in 1925 by the metallurgist Zay Jeffries, on the subject "Engineering and Science".

For most of its history the lecture was administered at the division level. In 2000 ASME elevated it to a Society-level award, beginning with recipient John W. Hutchinson in 2001. As a Society-level award, a single recipient is named each year and selected as a leader in pure and/or applied science or engineering.

== Recipients and notable lectures ==
Recipients of the lectureship include engineers and scientists who have received major national and international honors. Jack Kilby (1990) was awarded the Nobel Prize in Physics for his invention of the integrated circuit, as well as the National Medal of Science and the National Medal of Technology and Innovation. Other recipients have received the National Medal of Science, including Theodore von Kármán and Yuan-Cheng Fung (1985), while Chauncey Starr (1976) received the National Medal of Technology.

Over 80% of recipients since the founding of the National Academy of Engineering are fellows of the NAE, and several, such as Fung, Hutchinson, George F. Carrier, Stephen Crandall, Jacob Den Hartog, Hugh Dryden, Howard Emmons, Huajian Gao, Yonggang Huang, Van C. Mow, Robert Nerem, John Rogers, Ares Rosakis, Zhigang Suo and Savio Woo belong to multiple United States national academies.

Several Thurston Lectures have had a lasting scholarly influence. The 1950 lecture by Theodore von Kármán, "What Price Speed?", introduced the concept of specific power and the diagram now known as the Gabrielli–von Kármán diagram, comparing the efficiency of different modes of transport.

=== Society-level award (2001–present) ===
Year	Recipient
2026	Guy M. Genin
2025	Gang Bao
2024	Xin Zhang
2023	Ramamoorthy Ramesh
2022	Robert O. Ritchie
2021	M. Cynthia Hipwell
2020	Andrew Alleyne
2019	Yonggang Huang
2018	Guruswami Ravichandran
2017	Mohammed A. Zikry
2016	Romesh C. Batra
2015	Horacio D. Espinosa
2014	Ken P. Chong
2013	John A. Rogers
2012	Zhigang Suo
2011	Francis C. Moon
2010	Ares J. Rosakis
2009	Huajian Gao
2008	Vijay K. Dhir
2007	Wing Kam Liu
2006	Sia Nemat-Nasser
2005	Savio L-Y. Woo
2004	Bharat Bhushan
2003	Yogesh Jaluria
2002	Elias P. Gyftopoulos
2001	John W. Hutchinson

=== Division-level award (1969–2000) ===
Year	Recipient
2000	Duncan Dowson
1999	Adrian Bejan
1998	Van C. Mow
1997	Raymond Viskanta
1996	Don P. Giddens
1995	Paul Cooper
1994	Robert M. Nerem
1993	Chang-Lin Tien
1992	John H. Lienhard
1991	Frank Kreith
1990	Jack S. Kilby
1989	Stephen J. Kline
1988	Stephen H. Crandall
1987	Simon Ostrach
1986	Daniel C. Drucker
1985	Yuan-Cheng B. Fung
1984	Robert A. Frosch
1983	Ernst R. G. Eckert
1982	Hans M. Mark
1981	John Erik Jonsson
1980	Milton S. Plesset
1979	W. Dale Compton
1978	Allen F. Rhodes
1977	Robert C. Dean Jr.
1976	Chauncey Starr
1975	Myron Tribus
1974	Howard W. Emmons
1973	Henry M. Paynter
1972	George F. Carrier
1971	Milton C. Shaw
1970	Jacob P. Den Hartog
1969	Jakob Ackeret

=== Notable earlier awardees (1925-1969) ===
Year	Lecturer	Lecture
1966	George R. Irwin	"The Leading Edges of Fracture Mechanics"
1965	Hugh L. Dryden	A lecture on how "the space program was already having an impact on engineering because of new requirements in weight, size, performance, and reliability under extreme environmental conditions."
1950	Theodore von Kármán	"What Price Speed?"
1925	Zay Jeffries	Inaugural lecture, "Engineering and Science"

== See also ==
- List of engineering awards
- American Society of Mechanical Engineers#Awards
