= Dale Compton =

Dale Compton may refer to:

- Dale L. Compton (born 1935), American aerospace engineer
- W. Dale Compton (1929–2017), American physicist and engineering executive
