= William Prager Medal =

Mechanical engineering award

The William Prager Medal is an award given annually by the Society of Engineering Science (SES) to an individual for "outstanding research contributions in either theoretical or experimental Solid Mechanics or both". This medal was established in 1983. The actual award is a medal with William Prager's likeness on one side and an honorarium of US$2000.

== William Prager Medal recipients ==
- 1983 – Daniel C. Drucker
- 1986 – Rodney J. Clifton
- 1988 – James R. Rice
- 1989 – Richard M. Christensen
- 1991 – John W. Hutchinson
- 1994 – George J. Dvorak
- 1996 – Zdenek P. Bazant
- 1998 – John R. Willis
- 1999 – Kenneth L. Johnson
- 2000 – L. Ben Freund
- 2001 – Jan D. Achenbach
- 2002 – Siavouche Nemat-Nasser
- 2004 – Salvatore Torquato
- 2006 – Alan Needleman
- 2007 – Graeme Walter Milton, University of Utah, Expertise: Composites, Metamaterials
- 2008 – Richard D. James, University of Minnesota, Expertise: Quasicontinuum theory, Ferroelectric materials, Phase transformations
- 2009 – Alan Wineman, University of Michigan Ann Arbor, Expertise: Viscoelasticity, Polymers
- 2010 – Raymond W. Ogden, University of Glasgow, Expertise: Nonlinear elasticity, Elastomers
- 2011 – Ted Belytschko, Northwestern University, Expertise: Computational mechanics, Finite element method
- 2012 – Zhigang Suo, Harvard University, Expertise: Fracture mechanics, Electroactive polymers
- 2013 – George J. Weng, Rutgers University, Expertise: Micromechanics, Composites, Nanocomposites
- 2014 – Robert M. McMeeking, University of California, Santa Barbara
- 2015 – Huajian Gao, Brown University
- 2018 – Lallit Anand, MIT
- 2019 – Horacio Espinosa, Northwestern University
- 2020 – K. Ravi-Chandar, The University of Texas at Austin
- 2021 – Gerhard A. Holzapfel, Graz University of Technology and Norwegian University of Science and Technology, Expertise: Biomechanics, Constitutive equation, Mechanobiology
- 2022 – Vikram Deshpande, University of Cambridge Expertise: Micro-architected solids, Plasticity, Mechanobiology
- 2023 – Norman Fleck, Cambridge
- 2024 – Pierre Suquet, French Academy of Sciences
- 2025 – John Bassani, University of Pennsylvania
- 2026 – Samuel Forest, Mines Paris, French Academy of Sciences

== See also ==
- List of mechanical engineering awards
- Mechanician
