= Timoshenko Medal =

Award in recognition of distinguished contributions to the field of applied mechanics

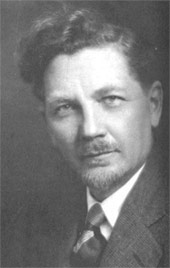
Stephen Timoshenko

The Timoshenko Medal is an award given annually by the American Society of Mechanical Engineers (ASME) to an individual "in recognition of distinguished contributions to the field of applied mechanics."

The Timoshenko Medal, widely regarded as the highest international award in the field of applied mechanics, was established in 1957 in honor of Stephen Timoshenko, an authority in the field. The Medal "commemorates his contributions as author and teacher."

The actual award is a bronze medal and honorarium. The first award was given in 1957 to Stephen Prokofyevich Timoshenko.

== Nomination procedure ==
The Timoshenko Medal Committee consists of the five recent Timoshenko Medalists, the five members of the executive committee of the ASME International Applied Mechanics Division (AMD), and the five recent past chairs of the AMD. See the list of current members of the Committee Upon receiving recommendations from the international community of applied mechanics, the Committee nominates a single medalist every year. This nomination is subsequently approved by the ASME; no case has been reported that the ASME has ever overruled a nomination of the Timoshenko Medal Committee.

== Acceptance speech ==
Every year, at the Applied Mechanics Dinner at the ASME winter annual meeting, the Timoshenko Medalist of the year delivers a lecture. Taken as a whole, these lectures provide a long perspective of the field of applied mechanics, as well as capsules of the lives of extraordinary individuals. A project has been initiated to post all Timoshenko Medal Lectures online.

== Timoshenko Medal recipients ==
- 2026 – Nancy Sottos, University of Illinois at Urbana–Champaign, USA.
- 2025 – Norman Fleck, University of Cambridge, UK.
- 2024 – Pierre Suquet, French National Centre for Scientific Research, France.
- 2023 – Guruswami Ravichandran, California Institute of Technology, USA.
- 2022 – Michael A. Sutton, University of South Carolina, USA.
- 2021 – Huajian Gao, Nanyang Technological University, Singapore.
- 2020 – Mary Cunningham Boyce, Columbia University, USA.
- 2019 – J. N. Reddy, Texas A&M University, USA.
- 2018 – Ares J. Rosakis, California Institute of Technology, USA.
- 2017 – Viggo Tvergaard, Technical University of Denmark
- 2016 – Raymond Ogden, University of Glasgow, Scotland, UK.
- 2015 – Michael Ortiz, California Institute of Technology, USA.
- 2014 – Robert McMeeking, UC Santa Barbara, USA.
- 2013 – Richard M. Christensen, Stanford University, USA.
- 2012 – Subra Suresh, National Science Foundation (NSF)
- 2011 – Alan Needleman, The University of North Texas (United States)
- 2010 – Wolfgang Knauss, Caltech (United States)
- 2009 – Zdenek P. Bazant, Northwestern University (United States)
- 2008 – Sia Nemat-Nasser, Department of Mechanical and Aerospace Engineering, University of California, San Diego (United States)
- 2007 – Thomas J. R. Hughes, Institute for Computational Engineering and Sciences, The University of Texas at Austin (United States)
- 2006 – Kenneth L. Johnson, The University of Cambridge (United Kingdom)
- 2005 – Grigory Isaakovich Barenblatt, Department of Mathematics, University of California, Berkeley (United States)
- 2004 – Morton E. Gurtin, Department of Mathematical Sciences, Carnegie Mellon University (United States)
- 2003 – L. Ben Freund Brown University (United States)
- 2002 – John W. Hutchinson, Harvard University (United States)
- 2001 – Ted Belytschko, Northwestern University
- 2000 – Rodney J. Clifton
- 1999 – Anatol Roshko, California Institute of Technology, USA.
- 1998 – Olgierd C. Zienkiewicz, Imperial College London, Institute for Numerical Methods in Engineering at the University of Wales (United Kingdom)
- 1997 – John R. Willis, University of Cambridge (United Kingdom)
- 1996 – J. Tinsley Oden, Institute for Computational Engineering and Sciences, The University of Texas at Austin (United States)
- 1995 – Daniel D. Joseph, University of Minnesota (United States)
- 1994 – James R. Rice, Harvard University (United States)
- 1993 – John L. Lumley, Cornell University (United States)
- 1992 – Jan D. Achenbach, Northwestern University (United States)
- 1991 – Yuan-Cheng Fung, Department of Bioengineering, University of California, San Diego (United States)
- 1990 – Stephen H. Crandall, Massachusetts Institute of Technology (United States)
- 1989 – Bernard Budiansky, Harvard University (United States)
- 1988 – George K. Batchelor
- 1987 – Ronald S. Rivlin
- 1986 – George Rankine Irwin
- 1985 – Eli Sternberg
- 1984 – Joseph B. Keller
- 1983 – Daniel C. Drucker
- 1982 – John W. Miles
- 1981 – John H. Argyris, Imperial College London (UK), University of Stuttgart (Germany)
- 1980 – Paul M. Naghdi
- 1979 – Jerald L. Ericksen
- 1978 – George F. Carrier, Harvard University (United States)
- 1977 – John D. Eshelby
- 1976 – Erastus H. Lee
- 1975 – Chia-Chiao Lin
- 1974 – Albert E. Green
- 1973 – Eric Reissner
- 1972 – Jacob P. Den Hartog
- 1971 – Howard W. Emmons, Harvard University (United States)
- 1970 – James J. Stoker
- 1969 – Jakob Ackeret
- 1968 – Warner T. Koiter
- 1967 – Hillel Poritsky
- 1966 – William Prager
- 1965 – Sydney Goldstein
- 1964 – Raymond D. Mindlin, Columbia University (United States)
- 1963 – Michael James Lighthill
- 1962 – Maurice A. Biot
- 1961 – James N. Goodier
- 1960 – Cornelius B. Biezeno
  – Richard Grammel
- 1959 – Sir Richard Southwell, University of Cambridge, Imperial College London (UK)
- 1958 – Arpad L. Nadai
  – Sir Geoffrey Taylor
  – Theodore von Kármán, California Institute of Technology, USA
- 1957 – Stephen P. Timoshenko

== See also ==
- List of engineering awards
- List of mechanical engineering awards
- List of awards named after people
- American Society of Mechanical Engineers
- Applied mechanics
- Applied Mechanics Division
- Mechanician

== Footnotes ==
- Timoshenko Lectures: A project has started to make the Timoshenko Medalist Lectures available on-line
