= Ken P. Chong =

- 張建平
- Born: Linpin, China
- Education: National Cheng Kung University (B.S.); University of Massachusetts Amherst (M.S.); Princeton University (M.A., M.S.E., Ph.D.)
- Awards: ASME Robert Henry Thurston Lecture Award (2014); NSF Distinguished Service Award (highest NSF honor, 2004); ASCE Edmund Friedman Award (1997)
- Scientific career
- Fields: Mechanics, Structures, Materials science
- Workplaces: National Science Foundation; National Institute of Standards and Technology; George Washington University; University of Wyoming

Ken P. Chong (Chinese: 張建平) is a Chinese-born mechanician and materials scientist who served at the U.S. National Science Foundation (NSF) as Engineering Advisor, Interim Division Director and program director of Mechanics and Materials at various times for 21 years, and is a former associate at the National Institute of Standards and Technology (NIST). He is the only NSF employee to have ever received the American Society of Mechanical Engineers (ASME) society-level Robert Henry Thurston Lecture Award. He currently serves as a Research Professor at George Washington University, in addition to appointments overseas.

== Early life and education ==
After attending Queen Elizabeth School, Hong Kong, Chong graduated from National Cheng Kung University with a B.S. in Taiwan,in civil engineering and structural engineering. He then obtained a M.S. in structural mechanics from the University of Massachusetts Amherst and earned an M.A., M.S.E., and Ph.D. in solid mechanics and structural engineering from Princeton University in 1969. After receiving his doctorate, he completed post-doctoral management training at the Federal Executive Institute, for senior federal executives, Class 221, 1996.

== Career ==
=== Government service: National Science Foundation and NIST ===
Chong spent 21 years at the U.S. NSF, where he served at various times as Engineering Advisor, Interim Division Director, and program director of Mechanics and Materials. In this role he directed the NSF Mechanics Program and helped nurture the emerging field of nanomechanics, including planning and supporting the NSF Nanomechanics (and Materials) Summer Institute. For this work he received the NSF Distinguished Service Award, the agency's highest honor. He has also been an associate at the National Institute of Standards and Technology (NIST).

Since 2011 he has served on engineering panels for the Hong Kong Research Grants Council and has acted as an expert panelist for Research Assessment Exercise and university research proposals with the Hong Kong University Grants Committee and the Innovation and Technology Commission. He was also involved in planning the Hong Kong University of Science and Technology in 1988–89.

=== Academic appointments and teaching ===
Chong is a Research Professor at George Washington University. He has taught at the University of Wyoming, the University of Hong Kong, the University of Houston, and George Washington University, and has held visiting professorships at MIT (1988) and the University of Washington (1987). He has also been a visiting professor at Tsinghua University, an honorary professor at the University of Hong Kong (1981), and the 49th honorary professor at the Harbin Institute of Technology from 2013. He was listed in Stanford University's top 2% of scientists globally in October 2022.

=== Research ===
In the 1970s Chong pioneered the analysis and development of re-usable, energy- and structurally efficient sandwich panels with cold-formed steel facings and rigid foamed cores, now widely used in industrial and commercial building systems. He also invented new semi-circular fracture specimens for core-based brittle materials, now widely cited and adopted as a standard. His research on the design of hybrid girders has been incorporated into AISC manuals. His experimental research on racket "sweet spots" in the 1970s influenced the design of tennis and other rackets. At the University of Wyoming he was principal investigator on more than 20 federally funded research projects (NSF, DOD, DOE, DOI), mostly on the mechanics of solids. He currently works on smart materials and the cloaking of seismic waves.

He has published over 200 refereed papers and is the author or coauthor of twelve books, including Elasticity in Engineering Mechanics, "Numerical Methods in Mechanics of Materials" with Applications from Nano to Macro Scales, CRC Press in 2018.Modeling and Simulation-Based Life Cycle Engineering, Mechanics of Oil Shale, and Materials for the New Millennium.

=== Editorial roles ===
Chong was a co-founder and honorary editor of the Journal of Smart & Nano Materials and editor of the CRC Press book series Structural Engineering: Mechanics and Design. He was the North American Editor of Elsevier "Thin-Walled Structures" for 26 years (1987-2013).

=== Honors and awards ===
Chong was honored with the Robert Henry Thurston Lecture Award from ASME in 2014. He has also received the NSF Distinguished Service Award, the agency's highest honor, for "his exemplary direction of the Mechanics Program and for his role in nurturing the emerging field of nanomechanics, including his planning, encouragement, and support of the NSF Nanomechanics (and Materials) Summer Institute"; the 2011 ASME Ted Belytschko Applied Mechanics Award for "significant contributions in the practice of engineering mechanics"; the 1997 ASCE Edmund Friedman Professional Recognition Award; the National Cheng Kung University Distinguished Alumnus Award; and the 2024 Lifetime Achievement Award from the Chinese Association for Science and Technology (CAST) in the US, in recognition of his "lifelong contributions to Science and Engineering and their lasting impact on Society".

Chong was elected a Fellow of the American Society of Mechanical Engineers (ASME) in 2008, and is also a fellow of the American Academy of Mechanics, the Society for Experimental Mechanics, and the American Society of Civil Engineers (ASCE), of which he is a distinguished member. His biographical profile appears in the American Men and Women of Science.

He has delivered the Mindlin Lecture at Columbia University in 2005, the Sadowsky Lecture at RPI in 2006, the Raouf Lecture at the US Naval Academy in 2012, and the Distinguished Lecture at the University of Macau in 2015.
