= Gang Bao =

Chinese-American bioengineer

- Education: Shandong University (B.S., M.S.); Lehigh University (Ph.D.)
- Known for: Nanomedicine, molecular imaging, CRISPR/Cas9 genome editing
- Awards: ASME Thurston Lecture Award (2025); Fellow, American Association for the Advancement of Science (2009); Fellow, American Society of Mechanical Engineers (2009)
- Scientific career
- Fields: Bioengineering, nanomedicine, genome editing, cell mechanics
- Workplaces: Rice University; Georgia Institute of Technology; Emory University; Johns Hopkins University

Gang Bao is a Chinese-American bioengineer and the Foyt Family Professor of Bioengineering at Rice University, where he is also a Cancer Prevention and Research Institute of Texas (CPRIT) Scholar in Cancer Research. His research spans nanomedicine, molecular imaging, cell mechanics, and genome editing, including the development of CRISPR/Cas9-based tools for treating single-gene disorders such as sickle cell disease. In 2025 he was selected to receive the Robert Henry Thurston Lecture Award from the American Society of Mechanical Engineers (ASME).

== Education ==
Bao received a Bachelor of Science in mechanical engineering in 1976 and a Master of Science in applied mechanics in 1981, both from Shandong University in China. He earned a Ph.D. in applied mathematics from Lehigh University in 1987, and from 1988 to 1991 was a postdoctoral fellow in the materials department at the University of California, Santa Barbara.

== Career ==
Bao began his academic career as a faculty member at Johns Hopkins University, where he worked from 1991 to 1999. In 1999 he joined the Georgia Institute of Technology and Emory University, where he held the Robert A. Milton Chair in the Wallace H. Coulter Department of Biomedical Engineering and directed a nanomedicine research center. In 2015, Bao joined the faculty of Rice University's George R. Brown School of Engineering.

== Awards and honors ==
In 2025, Bao was selected to receive the Robert Henry Thurston Lecture Award from ASME for his contributions to the mechanics of composites, cell mechanics, and nanomedicine. The award, established in 1925 in honor of ASME's first president, provides an opportunity for a leader in pure or applied science or engineering to deliver a lecture at the society's International Mechanical Engineering Congress & Exposition.

He is an elected fellow of the Biomedical Engineering Society (2017), the American Association for the Advancement of Science (2009), the American Society of Mechanical Engineers (2009), the American Physical Society (2007), and the American Institute for Medical and Biological Engineering (2007).
