= Savio L-Y Woo =

American bioengineer (born 1942)

Savio L-Y Woo is an American bioengineer currently the Distinguished University Professor of Bioengineering at University of Pittsburgh. He was born in Shanghai, China, in 1942 and immigrated to the United States prior to entering university.

Woo was elected to the National Academy of Medicine in 1991 and the National Academy of Engineers in 1994 for "contributions to orthopaedic bio-mechanics and tissue engineering and understanding of sports injury, repair, and remodeling". He was honored with the Robert Henry Thurston Lecture Award from the American Society of Mechanical Engineers in 2005.

In honor of his contributions to the field of biomechanics, the Bioengineering Division of the American Society of Mechanical Engineers established the Savio L.Y. Woo medal in 2016. This medal is awarded annually to an engineer who has demonstrated excellence in the translation of biomedical science and engineering to clinical practice.
