= Ares J. Rosakis =

Professor of Aeronautics (born 1956)

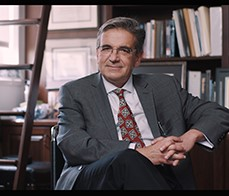
- Born: 12 September 1956 (age 70); Athens, Greece
- Education: Athens College; Oxford University; Brown University
- Known for: dynamic materials failure at various length; scales supershear earthquakes
- Spouse: Ioanna Dimitracopoulou (m. 1990)
- Children: 3
- Awards: Royal Society (2024); Zdenek Bazant Medal (2021); Horace Mann Medal (2021); Timoshenko Medal (2018); Theodore von Kármán Medal (2016); P.S. Theocaris Award SEM (2013); Commandeur dans l'Ordre des Palmes Académiques (2012); NAS (2016); NAE (2011); ASME Thurston Lecture Award (2010); AAA&S (2009); Presidential Young Investigator Award (1985)
- Scientific career
- Workplaces: California Institute of Technology
- Website: rosakis.caltech.edu

Ares J. Rosakis is a mechanical engineer and applied mechanician who is Theodore von Kármán Professor of Aeronautics and Mechanical Engineering at the California Institute of Technology (Caltech). His research spans dynamic fracture, experimental mechanics, earthquake physics, materials failure, impact mechanics, and solid mechanics. He is particularly known for pioneering experimental techniques for observing extremely rapid fracture and deformation processes, his discovery of supershear earthquake rupture in laboratory experiments, and his development of laboratory-earthquake methods for investigating earthquake physics.

== Education and career ==
Ares J. Rosakis graduated from Athens College, a Greek-American school, in June 1975. He subsequently moved to the United Kingdom to study engineering science at the University of Oxford, where he earned his bachelor’s degree in 1978. He then continued his graduate studies at Brown University, receiving a Sc.M. in 1980 and a Ph.D. in engineering in 1982, specializing in solid mechanics and structures with a minor in materials science.

In 1982, Rosakis joined the California Institute of Technology (Caltech) as an assistant professor, becoming an associate professor in 1988 and a full professor in 1993. In 2004, he was appointed the Theodore von Kármán Professor of Aeronautics and Professor of Mechanical Engineering. From 2004 to 2009, he served as director of Caltech’s Graduate Aerospace Laboratories (GALCIT), where he oversaw the development of new research and educational programs and strengthened collaborations with academic, government, and industrial partners. In 2005, he was a Distinguished Visiting Professor in the Department of Terre, Atmosphère et Océan at the École Normale Supérieure in Paris, and in 2008 he served as the Astor Visiting Professor at the University of Oxford.

From 2009 to 2015, Rosakis served as chair (Dean) of Caltech’s Division of Engineering and Applied Science (EAS). During his tenure, he oversaw the restructuring and expansion of the division, including the establishment of new academic and research initiatives in medical engineering, energy and sustainability, autonomous systems, and space solar power. He also promoted international academic partnerships and collaborations with institutions including the Indian Space Research Organization, the University of Seville, and École Polytechnique. In 2013, he was appointed the inaugural Otis Booth Leadership Chair of the Division of Engineering and Applied Science.

Rosakis’s career has been distinguished by major contributions to experimental mechanics, dynamic fracture, materials failure, and earthquake seismology, as well as by leadership in engineering education and research. He has been elected to several national and international scientific academies, including the U.S. National Academy of Engineering in 2011, the National Academy of Sciences in 2016, and the Academy of Athens. In 2024, he was elected a Foreign Member of the Royal Society, the United Kingdom’s national academy of sciences and one of the world’s oldest continuously operating scientific academies. He was formally inducted into the Royal Society on July 10, 2026. The Royal Society recognized his interdisciplinary contributions to dynamic fracture and impact mechanics, including his development of high-speed optical and infrared diagnostic techniques, his experimental discoveries concerning intersonic fracture and supershear rupture, and his pioneering use of laboratory earthquakes to investigate earthquake physics. His election made him the first Caltech professor of mechanics and mechanical engineering to be elected to the Royal Society.

== Honors and awards ==
Rosakis has received numerous national and international honors for his contributions to mechanics, materials science, aerospace engineering, experimental methods, and earthquake science. His distinctions recognize pioneering research on dynamic fracture and the failure of materials and structures, the development of high-speed optical and infrared diagnostic techniques, and experimental investigations of earthquake rupture and friction.

- 2026 -
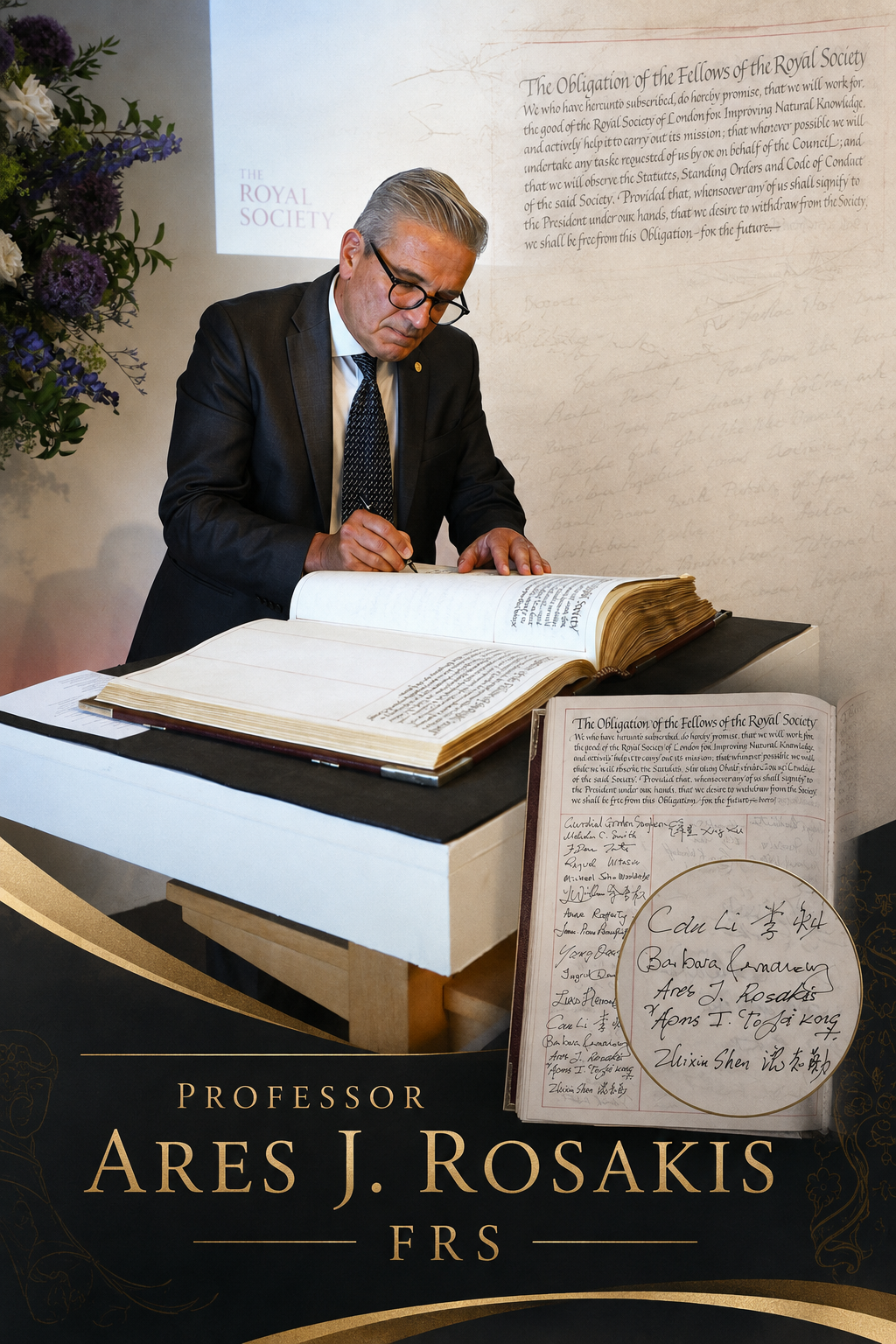
  Signing of the Royal Society Charter Book 4.10.26
  Formally admitted as a Foreign Member of the Royal Society (FRS) following his 2024 election, for inventing high-speed optical and infrared diagnostic methods for studying dynamic fracture, shear localization and impact phenomena, and pioneering the use of laboratory earthquakes to study earthquakes worldwide.
- 2023 -
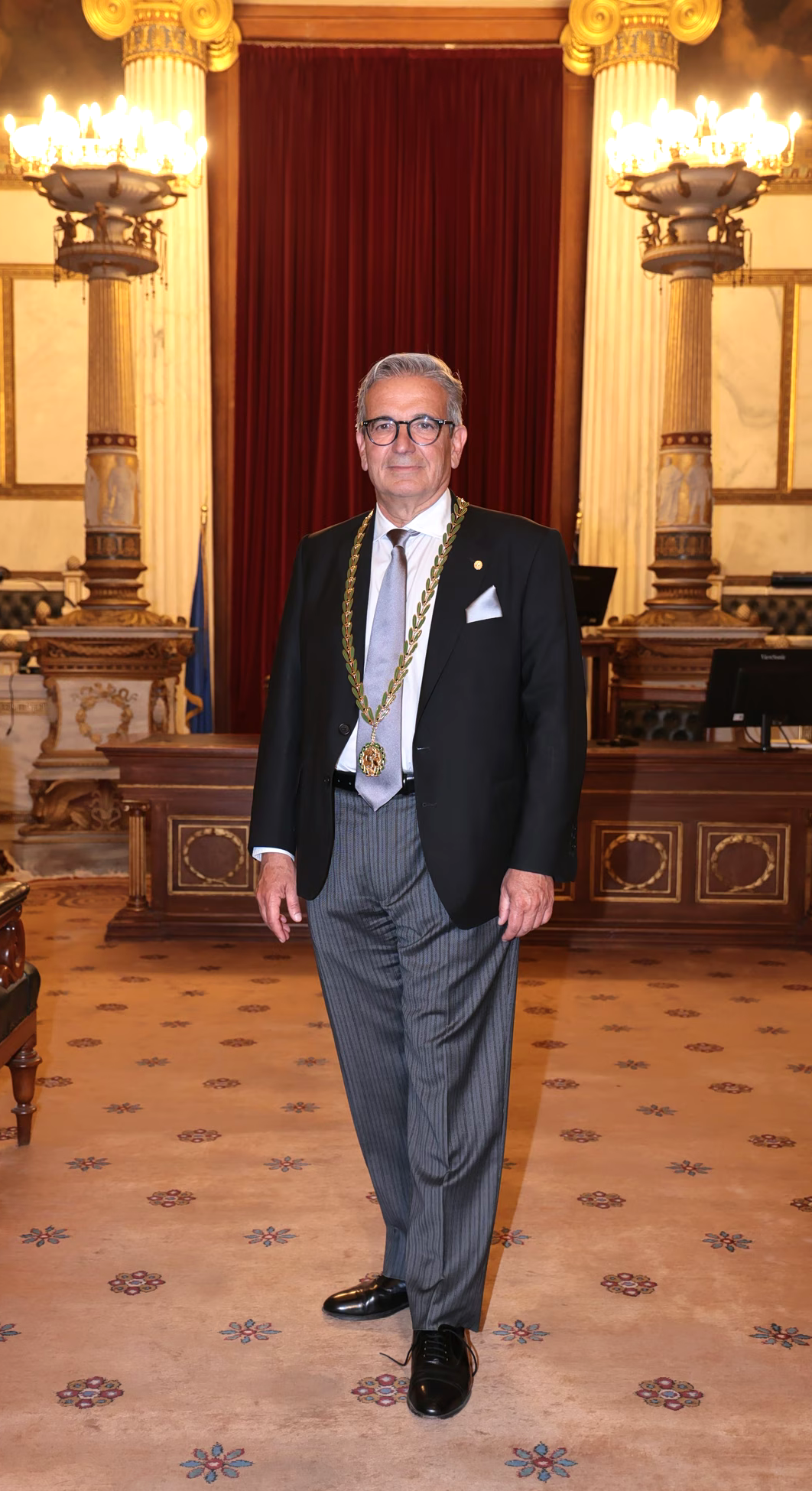
  At the Academy of Athens after his induction ceremony 5.16.26
  Elected full member of the Academy of Athens (AA) in recognition of his exceptional contributions to experimental science, solid mechanics and aerospace engineering, including pioneering research into the dynamic failure of materials and the mechanics of earthquakes.
- 2021 - Received the Zdenek Bazant Medal (ASCE) for Failure and Damage Prevention “For ground breaking contributions to Earthquake Mechanics, specifically for inventing “laboratory Earthquakes” which have transformed our understanding of failure and damage processes in the Earth that have proven central to infrastructure damage prevention”. This medal is the only recognition exclusively devoted to the field of materials failure.
- 2021 - Recipient of the Horace Mann Medal (Distinguished Alumnus Award) “For his research and mentoring skills, as well as being a champion of societal impact that can be realized through the sciences”, and was a 2021 Commencement Forum speaker at Brown University.
- 2020 - Elected member of the European Academy of Sciences (EurASc) in recognition of his pioneering contributions to experimental mechanics, dynamic fracture, earthquake physics and aerospace engineering.
- 2019 - Awarded the Aurel Stodola Medal from ETH Zurich in recognition of the lasting impact of his research on engineering science.
- 2018 - Received the Stephen P. Timoshenko Medal from the American Society of Mechanical Engineers, (ASME) “For pioneering contributions to the mechanics of dynamic failure of geological materials and systems, earthquake source physics and seismic hazard mitigation”. The Timoshenko Medal is the flagship award in the field of Mechanics of Materials and one of ASME's oldest and highest honors.
- 2017 - Elected honorary International Congress on Fracture fellow (IFC) in recognition of his pioneering research and major contributions to dynamic fracture mechanics and the experimental study of rapidly propagating cracks.
- 2017 - Elected fellow of the American Association for the Advancement of Science (AAAS) for, "Distinguished contributions in the field of aeronautics and mechanical engineering, particularly for fracture mechanics of materials ranging from thin films to earthquakes."
- 2017 - Elected fellow of the American Geophysical Union (AGU) for, “monumental achievements in the field of experimental fracture dynamics that have transformed our understanding of earthquake rupture processes”.
- 2016 - Received the Theodore von Kármán Medal from the American Society of Civil Engineers (ASCE) for “discovering several fundamental physical phenomena in dynamic fracture of heterogeneous materials and interfaces at various length and time scales”. This Medal is ASCE's highest recognition.
- 2016 - Elected member of US National Academy of Sciences (NAS) in recognition of his distinguished research in mechanics and engineering.
- 2015 - Given the Sia Nemat-Nasser Medal from the same society “for his interdisciplinary utilization of experimental mechanics to advance other fields of science, in particular Earthquake Source Mechanics”.
- 2014 - Elected member of Academia Europaea (AE) in recognition of his internationally significant contributions to aerospace engineering, solid mechanics, dynamic fracture and earthquake mechanics.
- 2013 - Received the P.S. Theocaris Award from the Society for Experimental Mechanics (SEM) “for his lifelong contribution to experimental science and mechanics”.
- 2013 - Elected foreign fellow of Indian National Academy of Engineering(INAE) in recognition of his eminence and outstanding accomplishments is engineering and technology.
- 2013 - Elected member of European Academy of Sciences and Arts (EASA) in recognition of his distinguished contributions to engineering and science, particularly his research in aerospace engineering, solid mechanics, dynamic fracture and earthquake mechanics.
- 2013 - Elected corresponding Member of Academy of Athens (AA) in recognition of his internationally distinguished contributions to mechanical and aerospace engineering, solid mechanics, experimental mechanics, and the study of dynamic fracture and earthquake rupture.
- 2012 - Made Commander of the Order of Academic Palms (Commandeur dans l'Ordre des Palmes Académiques) by the Prime Minister of the Republic of France “for his eminent contribution to French Engineering and Technical Education”.
- 2011 - Received the A.C. Eringen Medal from the Society of Engineering Science (SES) for sustained outstanding achievements in engineering science.
- 2011 - Elected member of US National Academy of Engineering(NAE) for discovery of intersonic rupture, contributions to understanding dynamic failure and methods to determine stresses in thin-film structures.
- 2010 - Awarded the Brown Engineering Alumnus Medal (BEAM) for an exceptional record of accomplishments in engineering, particularly his pioneering contributions to solid mechanics, dynamic failure and experimental mechanics.
- 2010 - Awarded the Robert Henry Thurston Award from the American Society of Mechanical Engineers (ASME), delivering a plenary lecture on "Intersonic Earthquakes: What Laboratory Earthquakes Teach Us About Real Ones."
- 2009 - Elected Society for Experimental Mechanics (SEM) fellow for having made significant accomplishments to the field of mechanics.
- 2009 - Elected fellow of American Academy of Arts and Sciences (AAA&S) in recognition of his pioneering contributions to fracture and failure mechanics.
- 2007 - Received the D.R. Harting Award from the Society for Experimental Mechanics (SEM) for the "Best Paper" published in Experimental Mechanics.
- 2005 - Received the William M. Murray Medal and Lecture “for his life-long contributions to the development and application of advanced methods for accurate measurement of transient, dynamic phenomena”.
- 2003 - Received the Frocht Award, which recognizes “outstanding achievement as an educator in the field of experimental mechanics”.
- 1996 - Awarded the B. L. Lazan Award recognizing individuals who have made outstanding original technical contributions to experimental mechanics.
- 1992 - Received the Hetényi Award, an honor given for the best research paper published in Experimental Mechanics.
- 1989 - Awarded the Rudolf Kingslake Medal and Prize from the International Society of Optical Engineering (SPIE) for his work in designing optical diagnostics.
- 1985 - Received the U.S. Presidential Young Investigator Award (White House 1985, awarded by US President Ronald Reagan) in recognition of his promising research contributions in experimental mechanics and dynamic fracture.

== Research ==
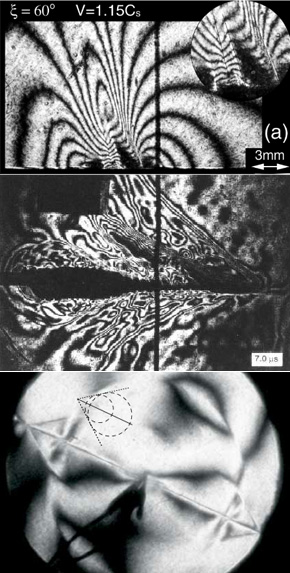
The fastest super-shear cracks on Earth: Bimaterial delamination; shear rupture of a graphite composite; and rupture of a frictional interface simulating a laboratory earthquake.

Rosakis is the author of more than 260 works on quasi-static and dynamic failure of metals, composites, interfaces and micro-electronic structures, with emphasis on the use of high speed visible and IR diagnostics and laser interferometry for the study of thermal fatigue, catastrophic failure and dynamic localization. His early work includes the study of dynamic, ductile failure of structural metals by using high speed photography, the real-time measurement of temperature fields at the vicinity of dynamically growing cracks and adiabatic shear bands and the development of a variety of optical and dynamic infrared diagnostic methods. He and his coworkers invented Coherent Gradient Sensing, CGS, interferometry, a method sensitive to gradients of optical path gradients which has been used in both fracture mechanics and thin film stress and reliability measurements at the wafer level. Other interests include dynamic fragmentation; shear dominated intersonic rupture of inhomogeneous materials and composites, rupture mechanics of crustal earthquakes, shielding of spacecraft from hypervelocity micrometeoroid impact threats, the reliability of thin films and wafer level optical metrology. Rosakis holds thirteen US patents on thin-film stress measurement and in situ wafer level metrology as well as on high speed infrared thermography.

In the late eighties, Rosakis introduced the concept of "laboratory earthquakes" and since then his research interests have included on the mechanics of seismology, the physics of dynamic shear rupture and frictional sliding and on laboratory seismology. The goal of this body of work is to create, in a controlled and repeatable environment, surrogate laboratory earthquake scenarios mimicking various dynamic shear rupture process occurring in natural earthquake events. Such, highly instrumented, experiments are used to observe new physical phenomena and to also create benchmark comparisons with existing analysis and field observations. The experiments use high-speed photography, full-field photoelasticity, digital image correlation (DIC) and laser velocimetry as diagnostics. The fault systems are simulated using two photoelastic plates held together in frictional contact. The far field tectonic loading is simulated by pre-compression while the triggering of dynamic rupture (spontaneous nucleation) is achieved by suddenly dropping the normal stress in a small region along the interface. The frictional interface (fault) forms various angles with the compression axis to provide the shear driving force necessary for continued rupturing. Rosakis and his co-workers, investigate the characteristics of rupture, such as rupture speed, rupture mode, associated ground motion under various conditions such as tectonic
load, interface complexity and roughness.

A Dynamic shear rupture, is captured propagating (left to right) along a frictional interface between two elastic plates at supershear speeds (speeds exceeding the shear wave speed of the solid). The images are created by using high-speed, digital photography (10^{6} frames/second) and Digital Image Correlation (DIC). DIC identifies gray level patterns in small pixel subsets and tracks their motion (From: Rosakis, Rubino and Lapusta, JAM, 2020, [DOI: 10.1115/1.4045715]).

Both homogeneous and bimaterial interfaces (abutted by various elastic and damaged media) are investigated. Rosakis and his coworkers have been credited with the experimental discovery of the "intersonic" or "supershear rupture" phenomenon. They also have investigated this new phenomenon in various engineering and geophysical settings involving shear dominated rupture in the presence of weak interfaces or faults. Their experimental discoveries of supershear rupture has refocused the attention of the geophysics community to the study of supershear earthquakes.

Another recent research interest for Rosakis is hypervelocity impact. Hypervelocity impact is a rising concern in spacecraft missions where man-made debris in low Earth orbit (LEO) and meteoroids are capable of compromising or depleting the structural integrity of spacecraft. To address these concerns, the goal of current research is to experimentally investigate the underlying mechanisms responsible for deformation and damage evolution during hypervelocity impact utilizing Caltech/JPL's Small Particle Hypervelocity Impact Range (SPHIR) facility. By combining high speed photography, optical, spectroscopic and infrared techniques, including Coherent Gradient Sensing (CGS) interferometry, the dynamic perforation behavior involving crater morphology, debris and ejecta formation and solid/fluid/plasma transitions and interactions have been examined.

== Academic leadership ==
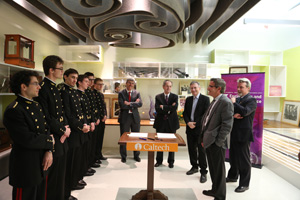
Caltech President Jean-Lou Chameau and Rosakis addressing École Polytechnique students during a ceremony to sign an agreement for a Master's Education Exchange Program in Aeronautics/Space Engineering and Mechanics (2013)

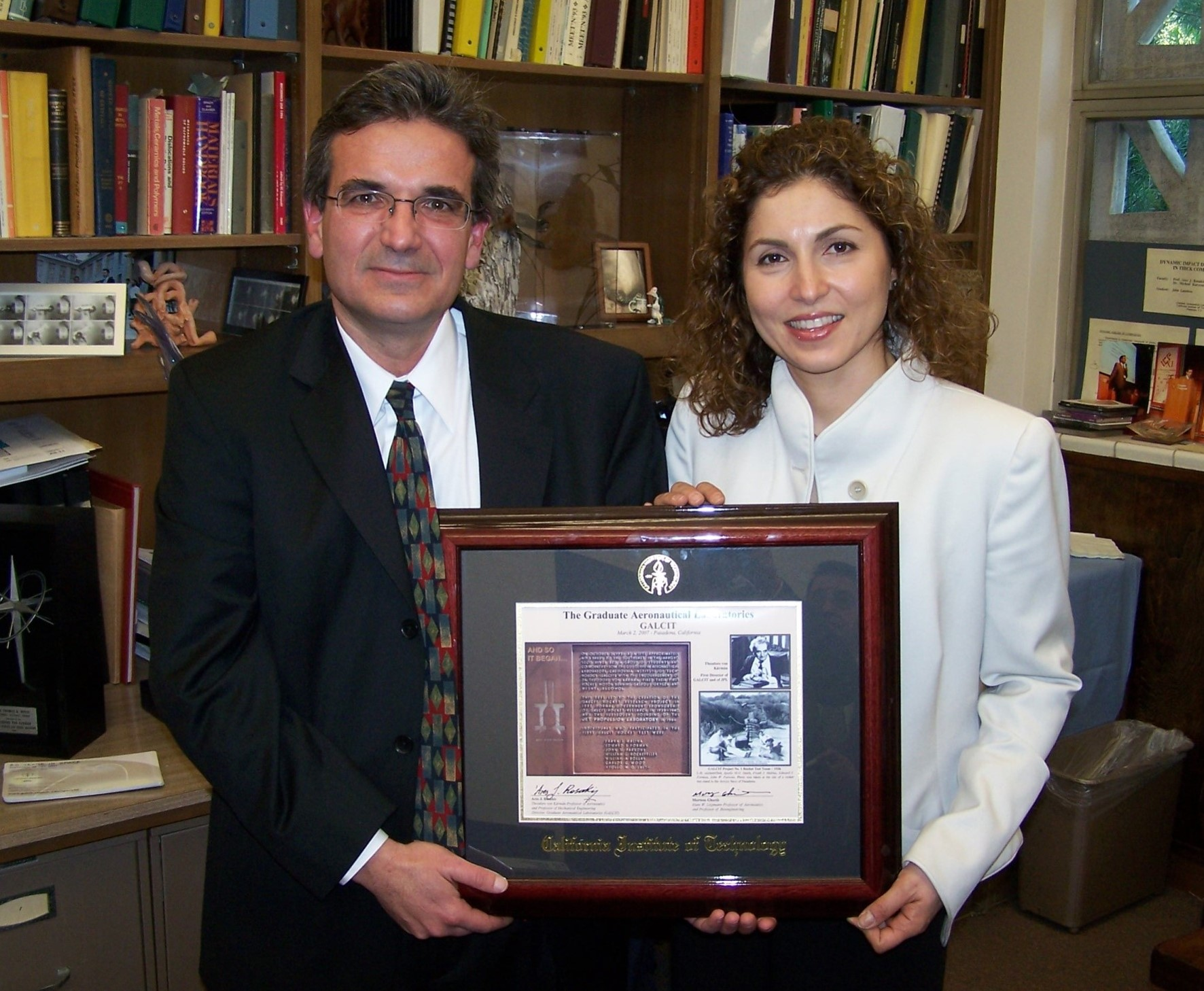
Anousheh Ansari, Space Station Astronaut and X Prize Foundation (XPRIZE) CEO and Rosakis (2009)

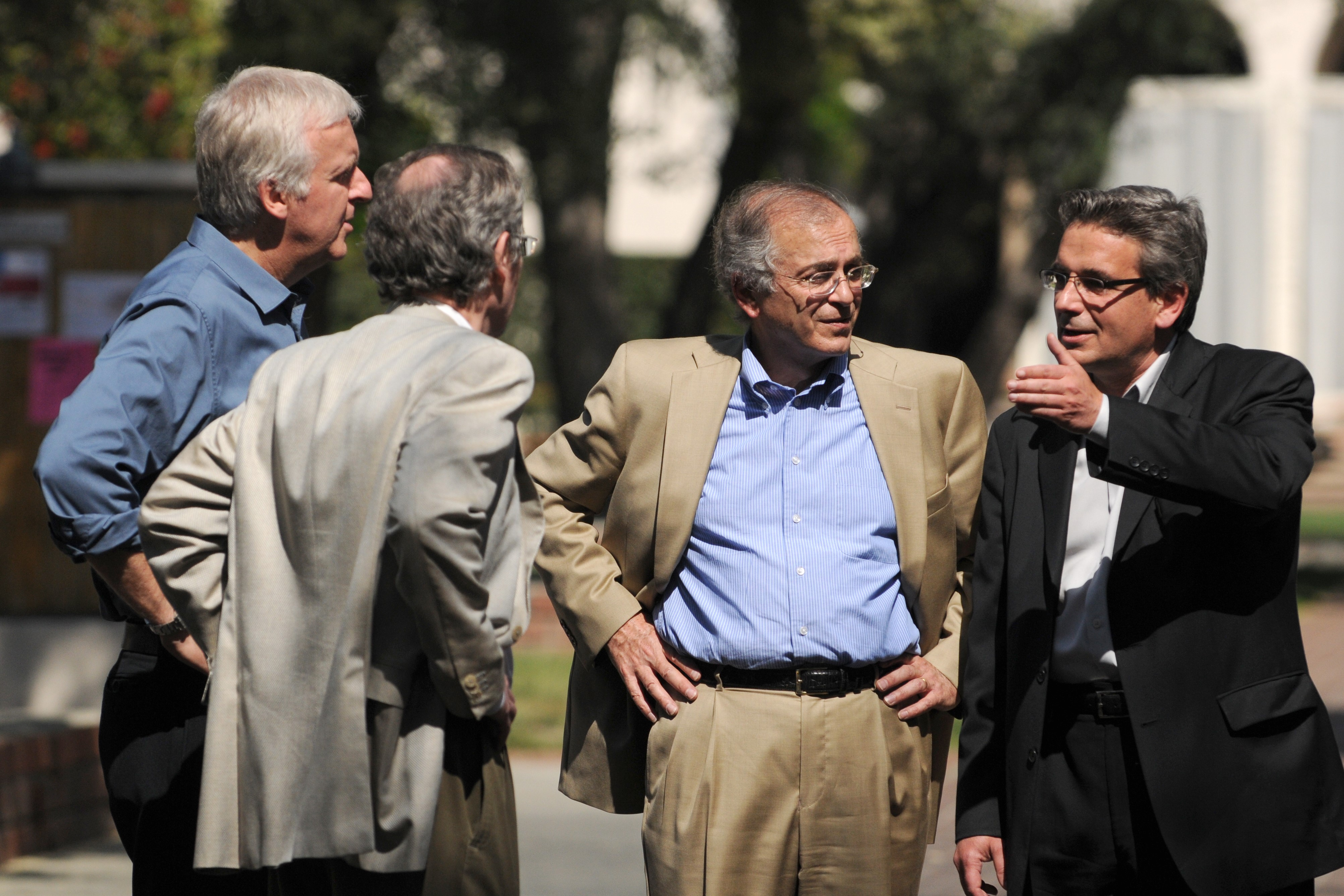
James Cameron, Filmmaker, Jean-Lou Chameau, Caltech President, Charles Elachi, JPL Director and Rosakis (2010)

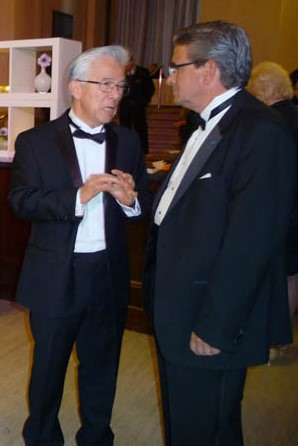
Professor Shih Choon Fong, Founding President KAUST (left) and Rosakis (right) at the Franklin Institute Awards Ceremony honoring Professor Subra Suresh, President, Carnegie Mellon University (2013)

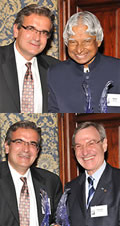
Top: Rosakis with Wings Award winner Abdul Kalam (11th President of India). Bottom: Rosakis with Wings Award winner, and Chairman of CNES, Yannick d'Escatha (2009).

2004 – 2009, as Director of GALCIT

- Led the initiative to revitalize the Graduate Aerospace Laboratories (GALCIT). Caltech was ranked #1 or #2 in Aerospace Engineering for the last six years by the U.S. News & World Report.
- Five new faculty members hired between 2005 and 2007, increased the size of GALCIT faculty by 40%.
- Established Masters Program in Space Engineering, in collaboration with the Jet Propulsion Laboratory (JPL); initiated follow-on PhD program in Space Engineering; guaranteed the long-term viability of these programs through new fundraising for lectureships and fellowships.
- Established a two-year dual masters' program between GALCIT and École Polytechnique in France. The program received the 2010 Andrew Heiskell Award for Innovation in International Education from the Institute of International Education in New York.
- Established a Master's of PhD exchange program with the Government of Andalucía and the University of Seville.
- Oversaw extensive fundraising and renovation of the historic Guggenheim Laboratory following removal of 10-foot wind tunnel. Four labs built, the Laboratory for Large Space Structures, the Allen Puckett Laboratory of Computational Fluid Mechanics, the Gordon Cann Laboratory of Experimental Innovation, and the Joseph Charyk Center for Bio-Inspired Design; Kármán Conference room renovated and GALCIT Archives created (made possible by Robert Herzog); and extensive new classroom, conference, office, and social spaces created.
- Established the GALCIT Director's advisory board to extend the fundraising reach of GALCIT.
- Contributed to the establishment of the Keck Institute for Space Studies at Caltech and JPL.
- Led systematic effort to formally involve GALCIT and EAS faculty in joint research projects with JPL, the newly established Keck Institute for Space Studies, and the aerospace industry.
- Co-organized (with JPL and Northrop Grumman) an international conference to celebrate the 50th Anniversary of Space Exploration.
- Incorporated the Aerospace Historical Society (AHS) into GALCIT and became its president. Among other outreach activities the Society is annually responsible for awarding the International von Kármán Wings Award.

2009 – 2015, as EAS Division Chair

- For three years in a row Engineering and Technology at Caltech was ranked #1 by the Times Higher Education World University Ranking (Thomson Reuters) for 2010–2011, 2011–2012, and 2012–2013.
- Presided over the structural re-organization of the Division of Engineering and Applied Science (EAS) at Caltech.
- Replaced the amorphous degree option structure with seven EAS departments and presided over their administrative restructuring.
- Introduced a system of multiple fundraising advisory councils, composed of Caltech alumni and Institute trustees, corresponding to each new department.
- Established the Center for Technology and Management Education (CTME) which provides executive training, courses and certificate programs to international companies and government agencies.
- Involved in the establishment and oversight of the Resnick Energy Sustainability Institute which aims to foster transformational advances in energy science and technology through research, education, and communication.
- Member of the oversight board for the Joint Center for Artificial Photosynthesis (JCAP) with the mission to keep the United States at the forefront of solar fuel research.
- Oversaw the fundraising and renovation of the Jorgensen Laboratory to serve as the new home for two of Caltech's key energy and sustainability research efforts: the Resnick Institute and the Joint Center for Artificial Photosynthesis.
- Presided over, along with the Chair of the Division of Geology and Planetary Sciences, the establishment of the interdisciplinary Terrestrial Hazard Observation and Reporting (THOR) Center.
- Established a graduate student exchange program between the Caltech's Division of Engineering and Applied Science and Institut Supérieur de l'Aéronautique et de l'Espace, located in Toulouse, France.
- Appointed by the President of Ecuador as a founding member of the Board of Trustees of Yachay International University.
- Created a partnership program with the Indian Space Research Organization (ISRO) and established the “Satish Dhawan” endowed fellowship sponsored by ISRO and the Government of India. Also created the “Abdul Kalam” prize in Aerospace.
- Established the Charles M. Vest Engineering Grand Challenges Scholarship at Caltech for International collaboration (endorsed by NAE and RAE).
- Founded the new Department of Medical Engineering at Caltech within the Division of Engineering and Applied Science.
- Facilitated the establishment of the Caltech - Northrop Grumman Space Solar Power Initiative (SSPI).
- Spearheaded the establishment of the Foster and Coco Stanback Center for Autonomous Systems and Technology (CAST).

2016–present: International and academic leadership

- Founding Chair, Board of Trustees, Yachay Tech University, Ecuador: Appointed by the President of Ecuador as a founding member and Chair of the university’s Board of Trustees (Comisión Gestora), helping establish Yachay Tech as a research-oriented international university.
- Served on the National Academy of Engineering Mechanical Engineering Peer Committee and was an honorary member of Yachay Tech University during 2016–2017.
- Vice President, International Congress on Fracture: Served as Vice President of the International Congress on Fracture and subsequently remained active in international fracture-mechanics organizations.
- Returned to the chairmanship of the Aerospace Historical Society, having previously served as its chair from 2006 to 2009.
- Chaired the search advisory committee for the positions of Joint Dean of Engineering and Dean of Science at Nanyang Technological University (NTU) in Singapore.
- Served as a Nanyang Visiting Professor at Nanyang Technological University, Singapore, continuing his academic collaboration and leadership activities there.
- Served as a member of the Graduate College Advisory Board at Nanyang Technological University.
- Served on the organizing committee of the first International Conference on Mechanics for Global Challenges, held in Singapore.
- Became a founding member of KOINON, an international community bringing together national and regional academies to promote cooperation among scientific and engineering academies.
- Continues to serve at Caltech as Theodore von Kármán Professor of Aeronautics and Mechanical Engineering. His principal Caltech administrative leadership positions have included Director of GALCIT (2004–2009), Chair of the Division of Engineering and Applied Science (2009–2015), and Booth Leadership Chair (2013–2015).

== National and international academy memberships ==
- 2026 - Elected formally as foreign fellow of the Royal Society.(FRS)
- 2023 - Elected full member of the Academy of Athens.(AA)
- 2020 - Elected member of the European Academy of Sciences.(EurASc)
- 2016 - Elected member of US National Academy of Sciences.(NAS)
- 2014 - Elected member of Academia Europaea.(AE)
- 2013 - Elected foreign fellow of Indian National Academy of Engineering.(INAE)
- 2013 - Elected member of European Academy of Sciences and Arts.(EASA)
- 2013 - Elected corresponding Member of Academy of Athens.(AA)
- 2011 - Elected member of US National Academy of Engineering. (NAE)
- 2009 - Elected fellow of American Academy of Arts and Sciences.(AAA&S)
