= Xin Zhang (engineer) =

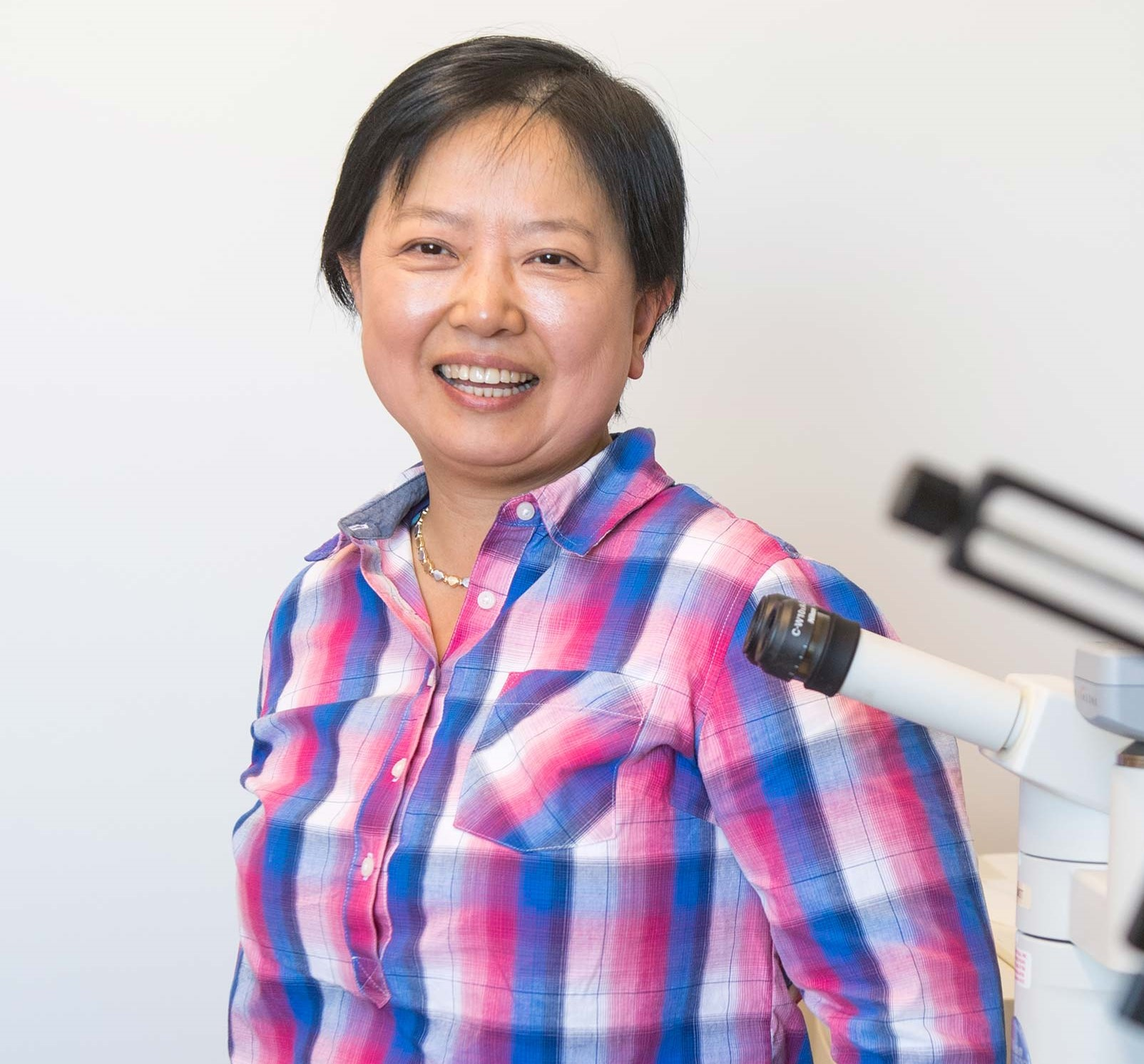
- Education: Hong Kong University of Science and Technology; Massachusetts Institute of Technology
- Known for: Metamaterials, Microsystems
- Title: Distinguished Professor of Engineering
- Awards: ASME Honorary Member (2026); Fast Company World Changing Ideas Awards Honoree (2025; 2026); ASME Thomas A. Edison Patent Award (2025); Fast Company Innovation By Design Awards Honoree (2024); ASME Robert Henry Thurston Lecture Award (2024); Member of European Academy of Sciences and Arts (2023); Sigma Xi Walston Chubb Award for Innovation (2023); IEEE EMBS Technical Achievement Award (2023); ASME Per Bruel Gold Medal (2023); STAT Madness All-Star Award (2023); Guggenheim Fellowship (2022); Fellow of National Academy of Inventors (2019); IET Innovation Award (2019); Charles DeLisi Award and Distinguished Lecture (2018); IEEE Sensors Council Technical Achievement Award (2016)
- Scientific career
- Fields: Mechanical Engineering, Electrical Engineering, Biomedical Engineering, Materials Science
- Workplaces: Boston University
- Website: sites.bu.edu/xinzhang-lab/

Xin Zhang is a Distinguished Professor of Engineering at Boston University (BU).

== Education ==
Dr. Zhang obtained her Ph.D. from the Hong Kong University of Science and Technology (HKUST). She subsequently served as a postdoctoral researcher and research scientist at the Massachusetts Institute of Technology (MIT).

== Career ==
Dr. Zhang joined the faculty of Boston University in 2002 and currently holds the esteemed title of Distinguished Professor of Engineering. Her appointment spans across the Departments of Mechanical Engineering, Electrical & Computer Engineering, Biomedical Engineering, and Materials Science & Engineering.

== Current research ==
Dr. Zhang directs the Laboratory for Microsystems Technology (LMST) at Boston University, which specializes in metamaterials and microelectromechanical systems (MEMS or microsystems). Her recent research endeavors in metamaterials have captured widespread global attention. Her pioneering work encompasses the creation of metamaterials tailored for highly efficient air-permeable sound silencing and noise reduction, alongside innovations that notably enhance MRI signal-to-noise ratio, thereby revolutionizing MRI performance. These groundbreaking achievements have resonated across hundreds of media outlets, eliciting profound interest from both the scientific community and industry leaders.

== Professional memberships ==
- Fellow of the American Society of Mechanical Engineers (2015)
- Fellow of the Optica (2016)
- Fellow of the American Institute for Medical and Biological Engineering (2016)
- Associate Fellow of the American Institute of Aeronautics and Astronautics (2017)
- Fellow of the American Association for the Advancement of Science (2016)
- Fellow of the Institute of Electrical and Electronics Engineers (2017)
- Fellow of the American Physical Society (2019)
- Fellow of the National Academy of Inventors (2019)
- Member of the European Academy of Sciences and Arts (2023)

== Honors, awards and special recognitions ==
- 2026: ASME Honorary Member
- 2026: Fast Company Fast Company World Changing Ideas Awards Honoree
- 2025: Fast Company Fast Company World Changing Ideas Awards Honoree
- 2025: ASME Thomas A. Edison Patent Award
- 2024: Fast Company Innovation By Design Awards Honoree
- 2024: ASME Robert Henry Thurston Lecture Award
- 2024: Falling Walls Science Breakthroughs of the Year Finalist
- 2023: Member, European Academy of Sciences and Arts
- 2023: IET Excellence and Innovation Awards – International Award Finalist
- 2023: Sigma Xi Walston Chubb Award for Innovation
- 2023: Falling Walls Science Breakthroughs of the Year Finalist
- 2023: IEEE EMBS Technical Achievement Award
- 2023: ASME Per Bruel Gold Medal
- 2023: STAT Madness All-Star Award
- 2022: IET Innovation Awards – Chief Engineer of the Year Finalist
- 2022: Guggenheim Fellowship
- 2022: Distinguished Professor of Engineering, Boston University
- 2021: Rajen Kilachand Fund for Integrated Life Science and Engineering Award
- 2021: IET Innovation Awards – Digital Health and Social Care Finalist
- 2021: IET Innovation Awards – Tech for Good Finalist
- 2021: Invented Here! Honoree, Boston Patent Law Association
- 2020: IET Achievement Medal Finalist
- 2020: Invented Here! Honoree, Boston Patent Law Association
- 2020: IET Innovation Awards – Excellence in R&D Finalist
- 2019: Fellow, National Academy of Inventors
- 2019: IET Innovation Awards – Emerging Technology Design Winner
- 2018: Boston University Innovator of the Year Award
- 2018: Charles DeLisi Award and Distinguished Lecture
- 2016: IEEE Sensors Council Technical Achievement Award (Advanced Career)

== Education and outreach ==
Dr. Zhang serves as the Director for both the National Science Foundation (NSF) Research Experiences for Undergraduates (REU) Site and Research Experiences for Teachers (RET) Site in Integrated Nanomanufacturing at Boston University. Additionally, she holds the role of Associate Director at the Boston University Nanotechnology Innovation Center.
