= George F. Carrier =

American mathematician

George Carrier
- At Harvard University, ca. 1952
- Born: May 4, 1918; Millinocket, Maine
- Died: March 8, 2002 (aged 83); Boston, Massachusetts
- Education: Cornell University
- Known for: Fluid dynamics Combustion; Tsunamis
- Awards: Otto Laporte Award (1976); Theodore von Karman Medal (1977); ASME Thurston Lecture Award (1972); ASME Timoshenko Medal (1978); Fluid Dynamics Prize (APS) (1984); National Medal of Science (1990)
- Scientific career
- Fields: Mathematics
- Workplaces: Harvard University; Brown University
- Thesis: Investigations in the Field of Aeolotropic Elasticity and the Bending of the Sectorial-Plate
- Doctoral advisor: J. Norman Goodier
- Doctoral students: Harvey P. Greenspan; Simon Ostrach

George Francis Carrier (May 4, 1918 – March 8, 2002) was an engineer and physicist, and the T. Jefferson Coolidge Professor of Applied Mathematics Emeritus of Harvard University. He was particularly noted for his ability to intuitively model a physical system and then deduce an analytical solution. He worked especially in the modeling of fluid mechanics, combustion, and tsunamis.

Born in Millinocket, Maine, he received a master's in engineering degree in 1939 and a Ph.D. in 1944 from Cornell University with a dissertation in applied mechanics entitled Investigations in the Field of Aeolotropic Elasticity and the Bending of the Sectorial-Plate under the supervision of J. Norman Goodier. He was co-author of a number of mathematical textbooks and over 100 journal papers.

Carrier was elected to the American Academy of Arts and Sciences in 1953, the United States National Academy of Sciences in 1967, and the American Philosophical Society in 1976. In 1990, he received the National Medal of Science, the United States' highest scientific award, presented by President Bush, for his contributions to the natural sciences.

He died from esophageal cancer on March 8, 2002.

== Carrier's Rule ==
Carrier is known for "Carrier's Rule", a humorous explanation of why divergent asymptotic series often yield good approximations if the first few terms are taken even when the expansion parameter is of order one, while in the case of a convergent series many terms are needed to get a good approximation: “Divergent series converge faster than convergent series because they don't have to converge.”

== Sources ==
- The Harvard Gazette Online
