= Allen F. Rhodes =

Allen Franklin Rhodes
- Born: October 3, 1924; Estherville, Iowa, U.S.
- Died: 2007 (aged 82–83)
- Education: Rice University; Villanova University; University of Houston (M.B.A.)
- Occupations: Mechanical engineer, business executive
- Known for: 89th President of ASME (youngest at the time of election)
- Spouse: Carol J. (Haisler) Rhodes (m. 1962)
- Awards: ASME Robert Henry Thurston Lecture Award (1978); Howard Coonley Medal; Richards Memorial Award; National Academy of Engineering (1985)

Allen Franklin Rhodes (October 3, 1924 – 2007) was an American mechanical engineer and business executive known for his contributions to petroleum production technology. He was a member of the National Academy of Engineering (NAE), elected in 1985, and a recipient of the American Society of Mechanical Engineers (ASME) Robert Henry Thurston Lecture Award in 1978.

== Early life and education ==
Rhodes was born in Estherville, Iowa, the son of Esther Butler Rhodes and Edwin James Rhodes, and spent most of his life in Houston, Texas. He earned a degrees in Mechanical Engineering from Rice University and Villanova University, followed by an M.B.A. from the University of Houston. From 1943-1946 he served as a lieutenant in the U.S. Navy, flying as a torpedo bomber pilot aboard the escort carrier USS Vella Gulf (CVE-111) in the North Pacific.

== Career ==
Rhodes began his career in 1947 at Hughes Tool Company. He moved to McEvoy Company, where he rose to president. After McEvoy merged with Rockwell in 1963, he held senior roles at Rockwell and organized the company's first central research laboratory. He served as a corporate planning executive at ACF Industries and as president and CEO of McEvoy Oilfield Equipment Company. He held 22 U.S. patents in oil and gas production equipment. He later served as an adjunct professor of mechanical engineering at the University of Houston.

== Honors and professional service ==
Rhodes was 89th president of the ASME, the youngest person to hold that office at the time of election. He was elected to the National Academy of Engineering in 1985 "for contributions to petroleum production technology and to the growth of the engineering profession." He received the ASME Robert Henry Thurston Lecture Award in 1978, the Howard Coonley Medal from the American National Standards Institute, and the Richards Memorial Award. The ASME Petroleum Division's annual service award, originally the OilDrop Award, was renamed the Rhodes OilDrop Award in his honor.
