= Zhigang Suo =

Chinese-born American scientist (born 1963)

- Born: 15 June 1963 (age 63); Xi'an, China
- Education: Xi'an Jiaotong University; Harvard University
- Known for: Solid mechanics
- Awards: Humboldt Research Award; Pi Tau Sigma Gold Medal (ASME); Special Achievement Award for Young Investigators in Applied Mechanics (ASME); William Prager Medal (Society of Engineering Science); Thurston Lecture Award (2012, ASME); Member, United States National Academy of Engineering; Member, United States National Academy of Sciences
- Scientific career
- Fields: Solid mechanics
- Workplaces: Harvard University
- Doctoral advisor: John W. Hutchinson

Zhigang Suo (Chinese: 锁志刚; born June 15, 1963) is the Allen E. and Marilyn M. Puckett Professor of Mechanics and Materials in the Harvard School of Engineering and Applied Sciences. His research centers on the mechanical behavior of materials and structures.

== Early life and education ==
Suo received a B.S. degree in solid mechanics from Xi'an Jiaotong University in 1985 and a Ph.D. in mechanical engineering from Harvard University in 1989, advised by John W. Hutchinson.

== Career ==
Suo joined the faculty of the University of California at Santa Barbara, and established a research group studying the mechanics of materials and structures. The group moved to Princeton University in 1997, and to Harvard University in 2003. He studied basic processes, including fracture, deformation, polarization, and diffusion, driven by various thermodynamic forces (e.g., stress, electric field, electron wind, chemical potential). He developed applications for microelectronics, large-area electronics, soft materials, active materials, and lithium-ion batteries.

With Teng Li, Suo co-founded iMechanica, the web of mechanics and mechanicians. In 2015, iMechanica has over 20,000 registered users. He is a member of the Executive Committee (2005-2010, Chair 2010) of the Applied Mechanics Division, of the American Society of Mechanical Engineers (ASME), and is a member at large of the US National Committee on Theoretical and Applied Mechanics (2006-2012).

Suo is a recipient of the Humboldt Research Award. He won the Pi Tau Sigma Gold Medal and the Special Achievement Award for Young Investigators in Applied Mechanics, both from ASME. He received the William Prager Medal, Society of Engineering Science. He received the 2012 Thurston Lecture Award from the American Society of Mechanical Engineers, delivering an award lecture entitled "Soft materials and soft machines." He is a member of the US National Academy of Engineering and the US National Academy of Sciences.

Suo is the author of many peer-reviewed articles, including "Mixed mode cracking in layered materials", (JW Hutchinson, Z Suo), Advances in applied mechanics 29 (63) and "Fracture mechanics for piezoelectric ceramics", (Z Suo, CM Kuo, DM Barnett, JR Willis), Journal of the Mechanics and Physics of Solids 40 (4). In 2015, he contributed to the article "Syringe-injectable electronics", which was published in Nature Nanotechnology.
