= W. Dale Compton =

American physicist and engineering executive

- Born: Walter Dale Compton; January 7, 1929; Chrisman, Illinois, U.S.
- Died: February 7, 2017 (aged 88); West Lafayette, Indiana, U.S.
- Education: Wabash College (BA); University of Oklahoma (MS); University of Illinois at Urbana–Champaign (PhD)
- Known for: Color centers in solids; leadership of corporate and academic engineering research; NSF Engineering Research Centers
- Awards: ASME Thurston Lecture Award (1979); Member, National Academy of Engineering (1981); George E. Pake Prize (2014)
- Scientific career
- Fields: Condensed matter physics Manufacturing engineering Engineering management
- Workplaces: University of Illinois at Urbana–Champaign; Ford Motor Company; Purdue University

Walter Dale Compton (January 7, 1929 - February 7, 2017), known as W. Dale Compton, was an American physicist and engineering executive. He was vice president of research at the Ford Motor Company from 1973 to 1986 and later the inaugural Lillian M. Gilbreth Distinguished Professor of Industrial Engineering at Purdue University. He was elected to the National Academy of Engineering in 1981 and was the recipient of the 1979 ASME Thurston Lecture Award.

== Early life and education ==
Born in Chrisman, Illinois, in 1929, Compton earned a B.A. in physics from Wabash College in 1949 and an M.S. in physics from the University of Oklahoma in 1951. He completed a Ph.D. in experimental condensed matter physics at the University of Illinois at Urbana–Champaign in 1955.

== Career ==
Compton began as a research physicist at the U.S. Naval Ordnance Test Station at China Lake, California, and the Naval Research Laboratory in Washington, D.C. In 1961, he joined the University of Illinois as a physics professor, and in 1965 became director of the Coordinated Science Laboratory, which focused on control, computer, and communication systems.

In 1970 he moved to Ford Motor Company, where he served as vice president of research from 1973 to 1986. In 1988, he joined Purdue University as the first Lillian M. Gilbreth Distinguished Professor of Industrial Engineering, where he worked on manufacturing systems and the management of technology until retiring as professor emeritus in 2004.

Compton worked on creation of the National Science Foundation's Engineering Research Centers program, which links university research with industry. He was also an co-author of the book Color Centers in Solids (with James H. Schulman, 1962).

== Honors and recognition ==
Compton received the 1979 Thurston Lecture Award from the ASME. He was 'elected to the National Academy of Engineering in 1981 and named the first NAE Senior Fellow in 1986. He later served the NAE as a councillor (1990–1996) and as home secretary (2000–2008). Other honors included the M. Eugene Merchant Manufacturing Medal (1999) and the George E. Pake Prize (2014). He was a fellow of the American Physical Society and the American Association for the Advancement of Science.
