= Cynthia Hipwell =

American nanotechnologist and tribologist

- Awards: ASME Thurston Lecture Award (2021)

Academic background
- Education: BSc, 1991, Rice University; MSc, PhD, 1996, University of California, Berkeley
- Thesis: Short time-scale energy transport in light-emitting porous silicon (1996)
- Website: www.theinventlab.com

Mary Cynthia Hipwell is an American nanotechnologist and tribologist. She is the Oscar S. Wyatt, Jr. '45 Chair II Professor of mechanical engineering at Texas A&M University College of Engineering. Hipwell was elected a member of the National Academy of Engineering in 2016, "for leadership in the development of technologies to enable areal density increases in hard disk drives". She is a member of the National Academy of Inventors, and in 2021 received the American Society of Mechanical Engineers' Robert Henry Thurston Lecture Award, delivering a lecture entitled "Heat-Assisted Magnetic Recording (HAMR): A Nanoscale Heat Transfer Adventure."

== Education ==
Hipwell studied mechanical engineering as an undergraduate at Rice University, and completed her Master's degree and Ph.D. at the University of California, Berkeley.

== Career ==
After completing her doctorate, Hipwell worked for electronic storage company Seagate Technology, and later for food and materials processing company Bühler, Inc.. While serving as Vice President of Engineering for Bühler, Hipwell was elected a Fellow of the National Academy of Engineering for "her leadership in the development of technologies to enable areal density and reliability increases in hard disk drives." In 2017, Hipwell was recruited to Texas A&M University College of Engineering with a $3 million grant from the Governor’s University Research Initiative. Upon joining the faculty at Texas A&M, Hipwell established the INnoVation tools and Entrepreneurial New Technology (INVENT) laboratory. She was also elected a Fellow of the National Academy of Inventors in 2018. The following year, Hipwell was recognized by the Aggie Women Network with their 2019 Eminent Scholar Award. In 2024, Hipwell became Deputy Director of the Human AugmentatioN via Dexterity (HAND) center and helped develop robots capable of enhancing human labor.
