= Zay Jeffries =

American engineer and metallurgist (1888–1965)

- Born: April 22, 1888; Willow Lake, South Dakota, US
- Died: May 21, 1965 (aged 77); Pittsfield, Massachusetts, U.S.
- Resting place: Pittsfield Cemetery; 42°28′1″N 73°15′28″W
- Education: South Dakota School of Mines and Technology (BSc, MSc); Harvard University (DSc)
- Spouse: Frances Schrader
- Children: 2 daughters
- Engineering career
- Discipline: Metallurgy
- Institutions: Case Western Reserve University
- Employer: General Electric
- Projects: Manhattan Project
- Awards: ASME Thurston Lecture Award (1925); AAES John Fritz Medal (1946); United States Medal for Merit (1948)

Zay Jeffries (April 22, 1888 – May 21, 1965) was an American mining engineer, metallurgist, consulting engineer, recipient of the inaugural (1925) ASME Thurston Lecture Award, and recipient of the 1946 John Fritz Medal.

== Biography ==
Jeffries was born in Willow Lake, South Dakota as one of the nine children of Johnston Jeffries and Florence (Sutton) Jeffries. He obtained his BSc in mining engineering at the South Dakota School of Mines and Technology in 1910. Three years later, he also obtained his MSc in metallurgical engineering from the same school, and in 1918 Harvard University awarded him his Doctor of Science degree.

After his graduation in 1910 he started as an assayer for the Custer mining company in South Dakota, and later that year he accepted an appointment as an instructor at Case Western Reserve University in Cleveland. In 1916, he was promoted to appointed assistant.

In 1914, he also started as a consulting engineer in the Cleveland-area. Later he consulted for metallurgy laboratories, and at the University of Chicago; he participated in the Manhattan Project.

Jeffries was elected a member of the National Academy of Sciences in 1939. In 1946, he was awarded the John Fritz Medal. He was elected to the American Philosophical Society in 1948.

In 1950, Jeffries became the Leonard Case Professor on Educational Policy at Case Western.

Jeffries was also a vice president of General Electric: as such, he and other officers were prosecuted in 1948 for violating federal law; that same year, he also received the Medal for Merit. In his later years, Jeffries retired to Pittsfield, Massachusetts, where he died of cancer in May 1965, survived by his wife and daughter.

== Pardon ==
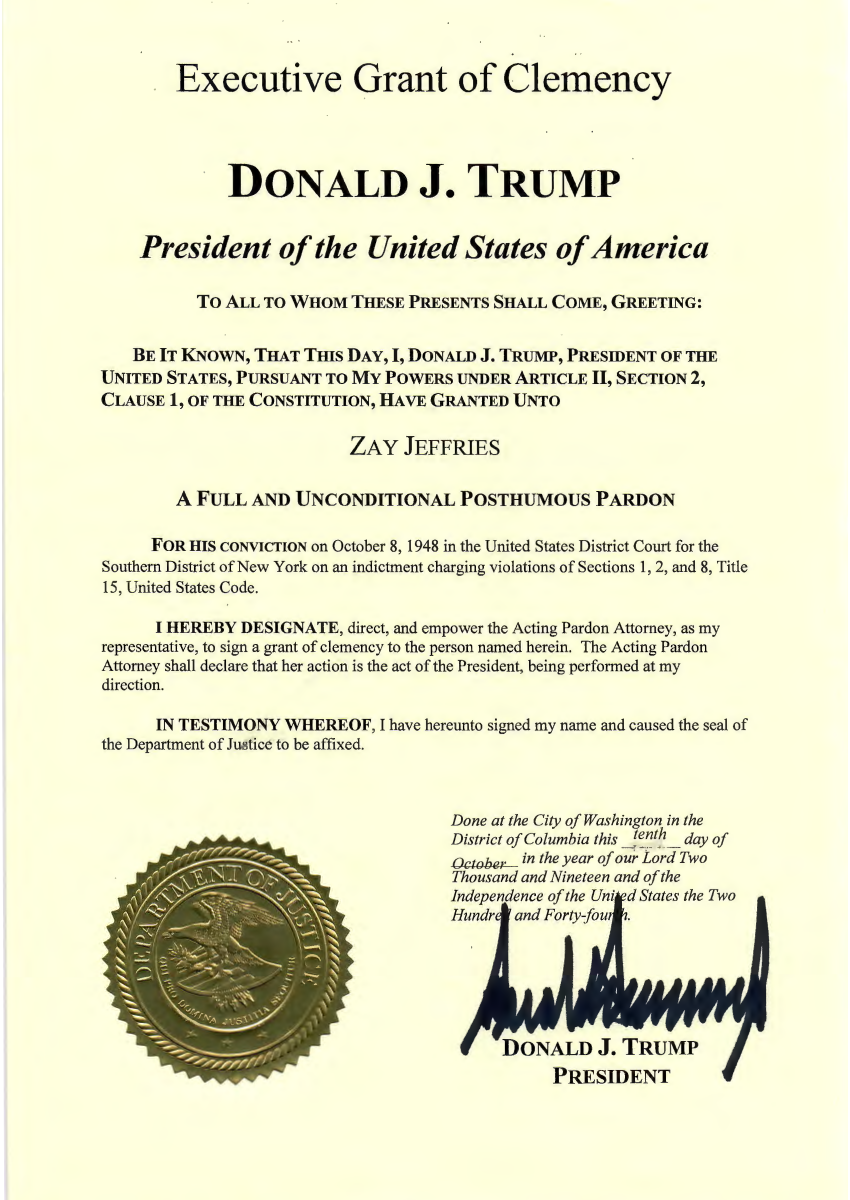
Pardon of Zay Jeffries by President Donald Trump on 10 October 2019

On October 10, 2019, President Donald Trump issued a full pardon to Jeffries for a conviction for engaging in anti-competitive practices in violation of the Sherman Antitrust Act of 1890, for which Jeffries had been convicted in 1948, and assessed a $2,500 fine (equivalent to $34,000 in 2025) with no jail time.

== Selected publications ==
- Jeffries, Zay, and Robert Samuel Archer. The science of metals. McGraw-Hill, 1924.
- Edwards, Junius David, Francis Cowles Frary, and Zay Jeffries. The aluminum industry. Vol. 1. McGraw-Hill book company, inc., 1930.
- Edwards, Junius David, Francis Cowles Frary, and Zay Jeffries. The Aluminum Industry: Aluminum products and their fabrication. Vol. 2. McGraw-Hill book company, Incorporated, 1930.

Articles, a selection

- Jeffries, Zay. "Effect of temperature, deformation, and grain size on the mechanical properties of metals." Trans. AIME 60 (1919): 474–576.
- Jeffries, Zay, and R. S. Archer. "The slip interference theory of the hardening of metals." Chem. and Met. Eng 24.24 (1921): 1057.
- Jeffries, Zay. "The trend in the science of metals."Transactions of the American Institute of Mining and Metallurgical Engineers, 70 (1924): 303–327.

== See also ==
- List of people pardoned or granted clemency by the president of the United States
