= Siavouche Nemat-Nasser =

Sia Nemat-Nasser
- Born: Siavouche Nemat-Nasser; April 14, 1936; Tehran, Iran
- Died: January 4, 2021 (aged 84)
- Education: Sacramento State College; University of California, Berkeley
- Known for: Micromechanics, mechanical behavior of heterogeneous materials
- Awards: National Academy of Engineering (2001); ASME Robert Henry Thurston Lecture Award (2006); Timoshenko Medal (2008); ASME Medal (2013)
- Scientific career
- Fields: Mechanics and materials, micromechanics
- Workplaces: University of California, San Diego; Northwestern University

Siavouche "Sia" Nemat-Nasser (April 14, 1936 – January 4, 2021) was an Iranian-American engineer and materials scientist who was Distinguished Professor of Mechanics and Materials in the Department of Mechanical and Aerospace Engineering at the University of California, San Diego (UC San Diego). He was a theoretician and experimentalist known for his work in micromechanics and the mechanical behavior of heterogeneous materials.

== Early life and education ==
Nemat-Nasser was born on April 14, 1936, in Tehran, Iran, and immigrated to the United States in 1958 to complete his undergraduate degree in civil engineering at Sacramento State College (now California State University, Sacramento). He earned MS (1961) and PhD (1964) degrees in structural mechanics from the University of California, Berkeley.

== Career ==
Nemat-Nasser joined the UC San Diego faculty twice. He was first on the faculty from 1966 to 1970, then spent a 15-year career at Northwestern University before returning to UC San Diego in 1985. At UC San Diego he founded and directed the campus-wide Materials Science and Engineering Program and initiated a program on the mechanical behavior of materials. He served as co-director and later director of the National Science Foundation-supported Institute for Mechanics and Materials from 1992 to 2000, and remained active as a researcher through his Center of Excellence for Advanced Materials until his retirement in 2019.

His research examined how a broad range of materials fail, including ceramics and ceramic composites, high-strength alloys, rocks and geomaterials, and advanced composites with electromagnetic, self-healing, and self-sensing properties, as well as shape-memory alloys.

== Recognition ==
In 2001, Nemat-Nasser was elected a member of the National Academy of Engineering "for pioneering micromechanical modeling and novel experimental evaluations of the responses and failure of modes of heterogeneous solids and structures."

In 2006, he received the Robert Henry Thurston Lecture Award of the American Society of Mechanical Engineers (ASME), the society's oldest named lectureship.

Other honors included the Timoshenko Medal (2008) and the ASME Medal (2013) from ASME, the Theodore von Kármán Medal from the American Society of Civil Engineers (2008), the William Prager Medal of the Society of Engineering Science (2002), and the UC San Diego Academic Senate Distinguished Teaching Award (2015).
