= International Mechanical Engineering Congress and Exposition =

Annual mechanical engineering conference and exposition organized by ASME

- Status: Active
- Genre: Academic conference and exposition
- Frequency: Annual
- Venue: Varies
- Locations: Primarily the United States, occasionally Canada
- Inaugurated: 1994; 32 years ago
- Participants: ~3,000-4,000 (attendees from 50+ countries)
- Organizer: American Society of Mechanical Engineers (ASME)
- Website: event.asme.org/IMECE

The International Mechanical Engineering Congress and Exposition (IMECE) is an annual academic conference and industry exposition organized by the American Society of Mechanical Engineers (ASME). First held under its present name in 1994, it is the society's flagship technical conference; ASME describes it as its largest research-and-development conference, and as one of the largest and most prominent annual gatherings globally in the field of mechanical engineering, with a program spanning essentially the entire discipline and its allied fields. The congress pairs a large multi-track technical program with an exhibition, and it serves as the principal annual meeting at which ASME's technical divisions meet.

IMECE is the successor to ASME's long-running Winter Annual Meeting. ASME, founded in 1880, held a winter meeting as its main general gathering for much of the 20th century; the society adopted the "International Mechanical Engineering Congress and Exposition" name in 1994, beginning with the meeting held that November in Chicago. The congress is typically held in November in a major North American city, and its proceedings are published by ASME and indexed in the ASME Digital Collection.

The program is built around ASME's technical divisions, and IMECE thus serves as the venue at which those divisions hold their annual business and committee meetings. The 2024 congress featured 18 technical tracks and more than 1,900 presentations and posters, with participants representing more than 50 countries. The proceedings of IMECE cover research across all mechanical engineering disciplines, including aerospace, manufacturing, biomedical and biotechnology engineering, dynamics and control, energy, fluids engineering, heat transfer, mechanics of solids, acoustics, micro- and nanosystems, transportation, and emerging technologies; they have been published in the ASME Digital Collection since 2002.

== Robert Henry Thurston Lecture ==
IMECE is the setting for the Robert Henry Thurston Lecture, established in 1925 in honor of ASME's first president. The Thurston Lecture is the oldest of ASME's named lectures and is regarded as the oldest named lecture in the field of mechanical engineering; it provides a leading figure in pure or applied science or engineering the opportunity to address the society on a subject of broad interest to engineers. The lecture has been delivered at the society's principal annual meeting since its inception: first the Winter Annual Meeting and, since 1994, IMECE. It was elevated to a society-wide award in 2000.

== History ==
ASME was established in 1880 and developed a winter general meeting that became known as the Winter Annual Meeting, which for decades served as the society's principal gathering for technical presentations. In 1994 the society rebranded this meeting as the International Mechanical Engineering Congress and Exposition, beginning with the congress held in Chicago on November 6-11, 1994. Over the following decades IMECE was held in major U.S. cities and, periodically, in Canada:Vancouver in 2010 and 2026, and Montreal in 2014. The 2020 and 2021 editions were held as virtual conferences during the COVID-19 pandemic. In September 2025, ASME launched a regional edition, IMECE India.

== Host cities ==
The table below lists the host cities of IMECE since the conference adopted its current name in 1994. The 2020 and 2021 editions were held virtually.

Host cities of the International Mechanical Engineering Congress and Exposition
Year	Dates	Host city	Notes
1994	November 6-11	Chicago, Illinois	First congress under the IMECE name
1995	November 12-17	San Francisco, California	
1996	November 17-22	Atlanta, Georgia	
1997	November 16-21	Dallas, Texas	
1998	November 15-20	Anaheim, California	
1999	November 14-19	Nashville, Tennessee	
2000	November 5-10	Orlando, Florida	
2001	November	New York, New York	
2002	November 17-22	New Orleans, Louisiana	
2003	November 15-21	Washington, D.C.	
2004	November 13-19	Anaheim, California	
2005	November 5-11	Orlando, Florida	
2006	November 5-10	Chicago, Illinois	
2007	November 11-15	Seattle, Washington	
2008	October 31 - November 6	Boston, Massachusetts	
2009	November 13-19	Lake Buena Vista, Florida	
2010	November 12-18	Vancouver, British Columbia, Canada	
2011	November 11-17	Denver, Colorado	
2012	November 9-15	Houston, Texas	
2013	November 15-21	San Diego, California	
2014	November 14-20	Montreal, Quebec, Canada	
2015	November 13-19	Houston, Texas	
2016	November 11-17	Phoenix, Arizona	
2017	November 3-9	Tampa, Florida	
2018	November 9-15	Pittsburgh, Pennsylvania	
2019	November 8-14	Salt Lake City, Utah	
2020	November 16-19	Virtual conference	Originally planned for Portland, Oregon; held online during the COVID-19 pandemic
2021	November 1-5	Virtual conference	
2022	October 30 - November 3	Columbus, Ohio	
2023	October 29 - November 2	New Orleans, Louisiana	Ernest N. Morial Convention Center
2024	November 17-21	Portland, Oregon	Oregon Convention Center
2025	November 16-20	Memphis, Tennessee	Renasant Convention Center
2026	November 8-12	Vancouver, British Columbia, Canada	Vancouver Convention Centre

== See also ==
- American Society of Mechanical Engineers
- Robert Henry Thurston Lecture
- List of mechanical engineering topics
