= Robert O. Ritchie =

American engineer (born 1948)

Robert Ritchie ForMemRS FREng
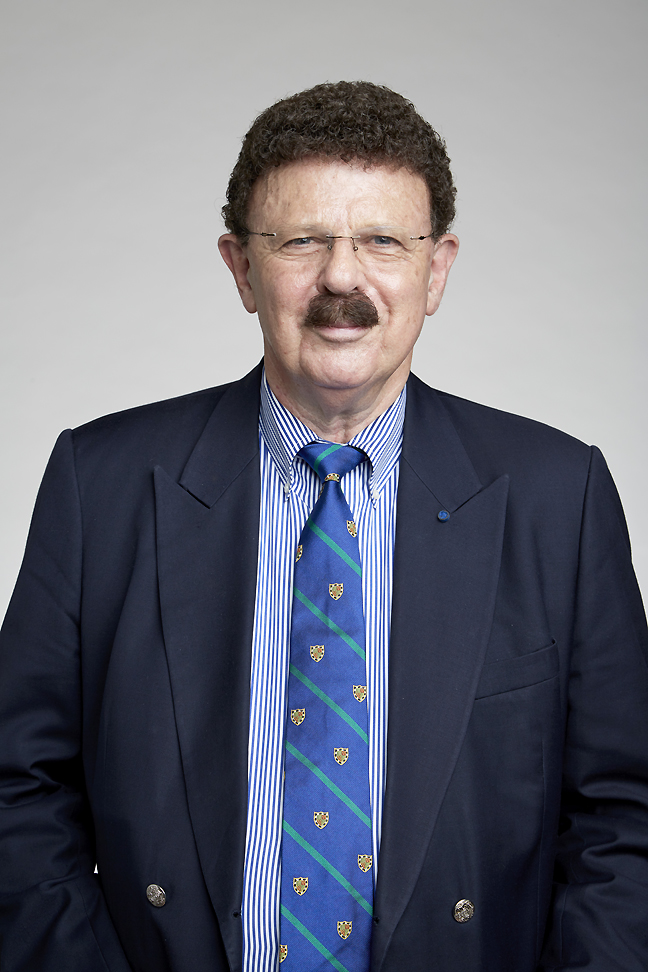
- Robert Ritchie at the Royal Society admissions day in London, July 2017
- Born: Robert Oliver Ritchie
- Education: University of Cambridge (BA, MA, PhD, ScD)
- Awards: Sir Alan Cottrell Gold Medal (2009); Eringen Medal (2010); David Turnbull Lectureship (2013); Acta Materialia Gold Medal (2014); Morris Cohen Award (2017); ASME Thurston Lecture Award (2022)
- Scientific career
- Fields: Materials science; Biomaterials; Fracture mechanics; Fatigue; Bone
- Workplaces: University of California, Berkeley; Lawrence Berkeley National Laboratory
- Thesis: Cyclic crack growth in steels (1973)
- Doctoral advisor: John F. Knott
- Doctoral students: Subra Suresh
- Website: www2.lbl.gov/ritchie

Robert Oliver Ritchie is an American engineer who is the H.T. and Jessie Chua Distinguished Professor of Engineering at the University of California, Berkeley and senior faculty scientist at the Lawrence Berkeley National Laboratory.

== Education ==
Ritchie received Master of Arts (MA), Doctor of Philosophy (PhD) and Doctor of Science (ScD) degrees in physics and materials science from the University of Cambridge. During his PhD, he worked with John F. Knott.

== Career and research ==
Ritchie is known for his research into the mechanics and micromechanisms of fracture and fatigue of a broad range of biological and structural materials, where he has provided a microstructural basis for their damage tolerance and fatigue limits. As of 2017 his interests are focused on high entropy alloys and bulk metallic glasses, the structural integrity of human bone, and the development of novel structural materials from biologically inspired engineering.

== Awards and honors ==
Ritchie won the David Turnbull Lectureship from the Materials Research Society in 2013, the Acta Materialia Gold Medal in 2014, and the Morris Cohen Award from The Minerals, Metals & Materials Society (TMS) in 2017. He was also the inaugural winner of the Sir Alan Cottrell Gold Medal from the International Congress on Fracture in 2009. In 2006, Ritchie was distinguished with the August Wöhler Medal given by the European Structural Integrity Society.

Ritchie is a Fellow of the Royal Academy of Engineering, the National Academy of Engineering of the United States, the Russian Academy of Sciences and the Royal Swedish Academy of Engineering Sciences and was elected a Foreign Member of the Royal Society (ForMemRS) in 2017.
