= Jacob Pieter Den Hartog =

Dutch American mechanical engineer

- Born: Jacob Pieter den Hartog; 23 July 1901; Ambarawa, Dutch East Indies
- Died: 17 March 1989 (aged 87); Hanover, New Hampshire, USA
- Citizenship: Netherlands; United States
- Education: Delft University of Technology; University of Pittsburgh; University of Göttingen
- Known for: Mechanical vibration
- Awards: ASME J P Den Hartog Award; ASME Thurston Lecture Award (1970)
- Scientific career
- Fields: Engineering
- Doctoral students: Li Minhua

Jacob Pieter Den Hartog (July 23, 1901 – March 17, 1989) was a Dutch-American mechanical engineer and Professor of Mechanical Engineering at MIT.

== Biography ==
J. P. Den Hartog was born in 1901 in Ambarawa, the Dutch East Indies. In 1916, his family moved to Holland. After attending high school in Amsterdam, he enrolled at Delft University of Technology in 1919 and received his MSc degree in electrical engineering in 1924. Unable to find suitable work in the Netherlands, he emigrated to the United States in 1924.

From 1924 to 1930, he worked as an electrical engineer in the research laboratory of Westinghouse Electric (1886) in Pittsburgh. There under the influence of Stephen P. Timoshenko, who took him as his assistant, he began to study electrical and mechanical vibrations. At the same time, he attended night classes in Mathematics at the University of Pittsburgh, where he became an authority in problems on mechanics and vibration and received a doctorate in 1929.

In 1930–1931, he studied at the University of Göttingen where he collaborated in the laboratory of Ludwig Prandtl (whose fellow Oscar Carl Gustav Titens previously worked for Westinghouse). From 1932 to 1945, he taught at Harvard University and took part in the organization of the International Congress of Applied Mechanics in Cambridge (Massachusetts) 1938.

During the Second World War, Den Hartog volunteered to serve in the US Navy, was engaged in the problems of vibration in shipbuilding. Commissioned as a lieutenant commander in the Naval Reserve, he was promoted to commander effective 1 August 1942 and then to captain on 20 July 1943.

In mid 1944, Den Hartog was chosen to be one of the four US Navy members of the Alsos Mission deployed to Europe to evaluate captured German technology and, in particular, anything related to nuclear weapons research. The other three Navy engineering officers were Captains Albert G. Mumma, Wendell P. Roop and Henry A. Schade. After the Alsos Mission determined that the Germans had not made significant progress toward a bomb, the Navy team shifted their focus to the detailed study of German submarine and rocket technology from January to September 1945. After the war, Den Hartog retained his reserve commission until December 1953.

From 1945 to 1967, he taught dynamics and strength of materials at MIT in the Department of Mechanical Engineering. Den Hartog was an outstanding classroom teacher. Every second year, MIT's Mechanical Engineering Department gives one professor the J. P. Den Hartog Distinguished Educator Award, to recognize sustained excellence in classroom teaching over a period of many years.

In 1962, Den Hartog was jointly appointed as a professor in the MIT Department of Naval Architecture and Marine Engineering. He became Professor Emeritus upon his retirement in 1967.

Den Hartog's former doctoral student Roger Gans credits Den Hartog as a major contributor to his derivation of Gansian notation, the practice of repeatedly interchanging non-interchangeable variables.

Jacob Pieter Den Hartog died at the age of 87 on March 17, 1989 in Hanover, New Hampshire.

== Awards ==
Den Hartog was elected an honorary member of the American Society of Mechanical Engineers (ASME) in 1964. He was awarded the ASME Thurston Lecture Award in 1970, and the ASME Timoshenko Medal in 1972 "in recognition of distinguished contributions to the field of applied mechanics." In 1987 the Design Division of ASME announced the establishment of the J. P. Den Hartog Award for "sustained meritorious contributions to vibration engineering" at its eleventh vibration conference; Den Hartog himself was the first recipient. Den Hartog's other honors include:

- American Academy of Arts and Sciences, Fellow
- Japan Society of Mechanical Engineers, Honorary member
- National Academy of Sciences, Member
- National Academy of Engineering, Member
- Royal Dutch Academy of Arts and Sciences, Foreign member
- Charles Russ Richards Medal, Worcester Reed Warner Medal,
- Founders Award of the National Academy of Engineering
- Lamme Medal of the American Society of Engineering Education

== Selected publications ==
He was a prolific author. His writings include:

- J. P. Den Hartog, Mechanical Vibrations, Fourth Edition, McGraw-Hill Book Company, New York, 1956
- J. P. Den Hartog, Mechanics, Dover Publications, Inc., corrected reprint of 1948 edition, ISBN 0-486-60754-2
- J. P. Den Hartog, Strength of Materials, paperback reprint of 1949 edition, Dover Publications, ISBN 0-486-60755-0, 1977
- J. P. Den Hartog, Advanced Strength of Materials, paperback reprint of 1952 edition, Dover Publications, ISBN 0-486-65407-9, 1987
