= Huajian Gao =

Chinese–American mechanician (born 1963)

- 高华健
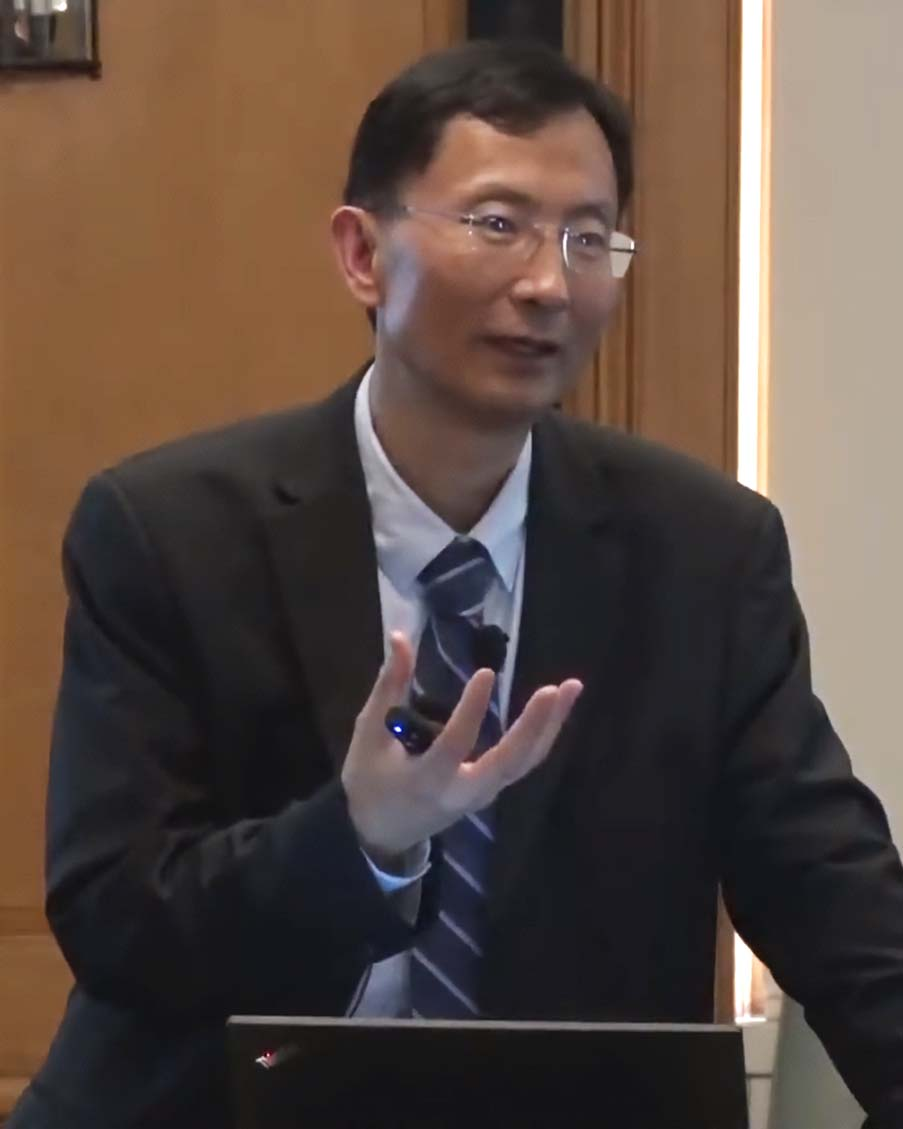
- Born: December 7, 1963 (age 62); Chengdu, Sichuan, China
- Citizenship: U.S.
- Education: Xi'an Jiaotong University, Harvard University
- Known for: Micro- and nanomechanics of thin films, hierarchically structured materials, and cell-nanomaterials interactions.
- Awards: ASME Thurston Lecture Award (2009); Rodney Hill Prize in Solid Mechanics from International Union of Theoretical and Applied Mechanics.; ASME Medal (2023)
- Scientific career
- Fields: Solid Mechanics, Mechanical Engineering, Materials Science
- Workplaces: Brown University; Max Planck Institute for Metals Research; Stanford University; Nanyang Technological University; Tsinghua University; Institute of High Performance Computing

Huajian Gao FRS (Chinese: 高华健; pinyin: Gāo Huájiàn, born December 7, 1963) is a Chinese-American mechanician who is widely known for his contributions to the field of solid mechanics, particularly on the micro- and nanomechanics of thin films, hierarchically structured materials, and cell-nanomaterial interactions. He is a professor at Tsinghua University, a Distinguished University Professor at Nanyang Technological University in Singapore and Walter H. Annenberg Professor Emeritus of Engineering at Brown University. He is the editor-in-chief of Journal of the Mechanics and Physics of Solids.

Gao was elected a member of the National Academy of Engineering in 2012 for contributions to micromechanics of thin films and hierarchically structured materials. In 2021 he received the Timoshenko Medal for "pioneering contributions to nanomechanics of engineering and biological systems."

== Education and career ==
Huajian Gao was born in Chengdu, Sichuan on December 7, 1963.

He received his B.S. in Engineering Mechanics from Xi'an Jiaotong University of China in 1982, and his M.S. and Ph.D. in Engineering Science from Harvard University in 1984 and 1988, respectively. He taught at Stanford University between 1988 and 2002, where he was promoted to Associate Professor with tenure in 1994 and to full Professor in 2000. He joined the Max Planck Society in 2001 as a Director at the Max Planck Institute for Metals Research in Stuttgart, Germany. In 2006 he moved to Brown University as the Walter H. Annenberg Professor of Engineering. In 2019, he joined Nanyang Technological University as 2019 Distinguished University Professors, also jointly affiliated as scientific director of Institute of High Performance Computing, A*STAR, Singapore. Gao is the editor of the Journal of the Mechanics and Physics of Solids. In January 2024 it was announced that Huajian Gao would be joining Tsinghua University in a full time chair professor position.

== Research ==
Gao has a background in applied mechanics and engineering science. His research interests span over Solid Mechanics, Nanomechanics and Biomechanics. He works on mechanics of thin films and hierarchically structured materials, mechanics of biological and bio-inspired materials, mechanics of nanostructured and nanotwinned materials, mechanics of cell adhesion, mechanics of cell-nanomaterials interactions, mechanics of energy storage systems, and mechanics of metallic glasses.

== Awards ==
Gao received academic honors including a John Simon Guggenheim Fellowship in 1995 and the Humboldt Prize from Germany and the Robert Henry Thurston Lecture Award from the American Society of Mechanical Engineers in 2009. He received the Rodney Hill Prize in Solid Mechanics from the International Union of Theoretical and Applied Mechanics (IUTAM) in 2012. He was elected to the National Academy of Engineering in 2012, to the Chinese Academy of Sciences (as a foreign academician) in 2015, the German Academy of Sciences Leopoldina in 2017, the National Academy of Sciences in 2018 and American Academy of Arts and Sciences in 2019.

In 2021 he received the Timoshenko Medal for "pioneering contributions to nanomechanics of engineering and biological systems."

In 2023, he was elected a Fellow of The Royal Society.
