= Yuan-Cheng Fung =

Chinese-American bioengineer and writer (1919–2019)

Yuan-Cheng Fung 馮元楨
- Born: September 15, 1919; Changzhou, Jiangsu, China
- Died: December 15, 2019 (aged 100); San Diego, California, U.S.
- Citizenship: American
- Education: National Central University; California Institute of Technology
- Known for: Bioengineering; Biomechanics
- Spouse: Luna Yu Hsien-Shih
- Children: 2
- Awards: von Karman Medal (1976); Otto Laporte Award (1977); ASME Thurston Lecture Award (1985); ASME Timoshenko Medal (1991); National Medal of Science (2000); Jordan Allen Medal (1991); Russ Prize (2007)
- Scientific career
- Fields: Bioengineering; Biomechanics
- Workplaces: California Institute of Technology; UC San Diego
- Doctoral advisor: Ernest Sechler

Yuan-Cheng "Bert" Fung (September 15, 1919 – December 15, 2019) was a Chinese-American bioengineer and writer. He is regarded as a founding figure of bioengineering, tissue engineering, and the "Founder of Modern Biomechanics".

== Biography ==
Fung was born in Jiangsu Province, China in 1919. He earned a bachelor's degree in 1941 and a master's degree in 1943 from the National Central University (later renamed Nanjing University in mainland China and reinstated in Taiwan), and earned a Ph.D. from the California Institute of Technology in 1948. Fung was Professor Emeritus and Research Engineer at the University of California San Diego. He published prominent texts along with Pin Tong who was then at Hong Kong University of Science & Technology. Fung died at Jacobs Medical Center in San Diego, California, aged 100, on December 15, 2019.

Fung was married to Luna Yu Hsien-Shih, a former mathematician and cofounder of the UC San Diego International Center, until her death in 2017. The couple raised two children.

== Research ==
He is the author of numerous books including Foundations of Solid Mechanics, Continuum Mechanics, and a series of books on Biomechanics. He is also one of the principal founders of the Journal of Biomechanics and was a past chair of the ASME International Applied Mechanics Division. In 1972, Fung established the Biomechanics Symposium under the American Society of Mechanical Engineers. This biannual summer meeting, first held at the Georgia Institute of Technology, became the annual Summer Bioengineering Conference. Fung and colleagues were also the first to recognize the importance of residual stress on arterial mechanical behavior.

=== Fung's Law ===
Fung's famous exponential strain constitutive equation for preconditioned soft tissues is

$$w = \frac{1}{2}\left[q + c\left( e^Q -1 \right) \right]$$

with

$$q=a_{ijkl}E_{ij}E_{kl} \qquad Q=b_{ijkl}E_{ij}E_{kl}$$

quadratic forms of Green-Lagrange strains $E_{ij}$ and $a_{ijkl}$, $b_{ijkl}$ and $c$ material constants. $w$ is a strain energy function per volume unit, which is the mechanical strain energy for a given temperature. Materials that follow this law are known as Fung-elastic.

== Honors and awards ==
- Theodore von Karman Medal, 1976
- Otto Laporte Award, 1977
- Worcester Reed Warner Medal, 1984
- ASME Robert Henry Thurston Lecture Award, 1985
- Jean-Leonard-Marie Poiseuille Award, 1986
- ASME Timoshenko Medal, 1991
- Lissner Award for Bioengineering, from ASME
- Borelli Medal, from ASB
- Landis Award, from Microcirculation Society
- Alza Award, from BMES
- Melville Medal, 1994
- United States National Academy of Engineering Founders Award (NAE Founders Award), 1998
- National Medal of Science, 2000
- Fritz J. and Dolores H. Russ Prize, 2007 ("for the characterization and modeling of human tissue mechanics and function leading to prevention and mitigation of trauma.")
- Revelle Medal, from UC San Diego, 2016

Fung was elected to the United States National Academy of Sciences (1993), the National Academy of Engineering (1979), the Institute of Medicine (1991), the Academia Sinica (1968), and was a Foreign Member of the Chinese Academy of Sciences (1994 election).
