= Robert Henry Thurston =

American engineer (1839–1903)

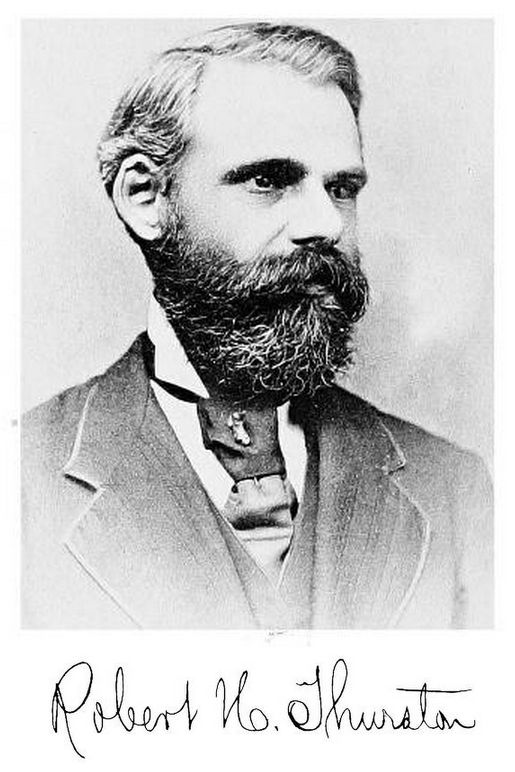
- Born: October 25, 1839; Providence, Rhode Island
- Died: October 25, 1903 (aged 64); Ithaca, New York

Robert Henry Thurston (October 25, 1839 – October 25, 1903) was an American engineer, and the first professor of mechanical engineering at Stevens Institute of Technology.

He was assistant professor at the US Naval Academy in Annapolis and a published specialist on iron and steel as well as steam engines, when he was invited in 1871 by Stevens' president Henry Morton to head mechanical engineering at Stevens. The same year Thurston was appointed the first professor of mechanical engineering at Stevens Institute of Technology.

== Biography ==
Thurston was born 1839 in Providence, Rhode Island, the eldest son of Robert Lawton and Harriet Thurston of Providence. He was trained in the workshop of his father, and graduated from Brown University in 1859.

Thurston was engaged with the business firm of which his father was senior partner until 1861, when he entered the navy as an officer of engineers. He served during the civil war on various vessels, and was present at the Battle of Port Royal and at the Siege of Charleston. He was attached to the North and South Atlantic squadrons until the close of 1865.

In 1865, he was stationed as Assistant Professor of Natural and Experimental Philosophy at the United States Naval Academy at Annapolis, where he also acted as lecturer on chemistry and physics. In 1870 he visited Europe, for the purpose of studying the British iron manufacturing districts, and in 1871 was appointed professor of mechanical engineering at the Stevens Institute of Technology. In that year he conducted, in behalf of a committee of the American Institute, a series of experiments on steam boilers, in which, for the first time, all losses of heat were noted, and by condensing all the steam generated, the quantity of water entrained by the steam was accurately noted.

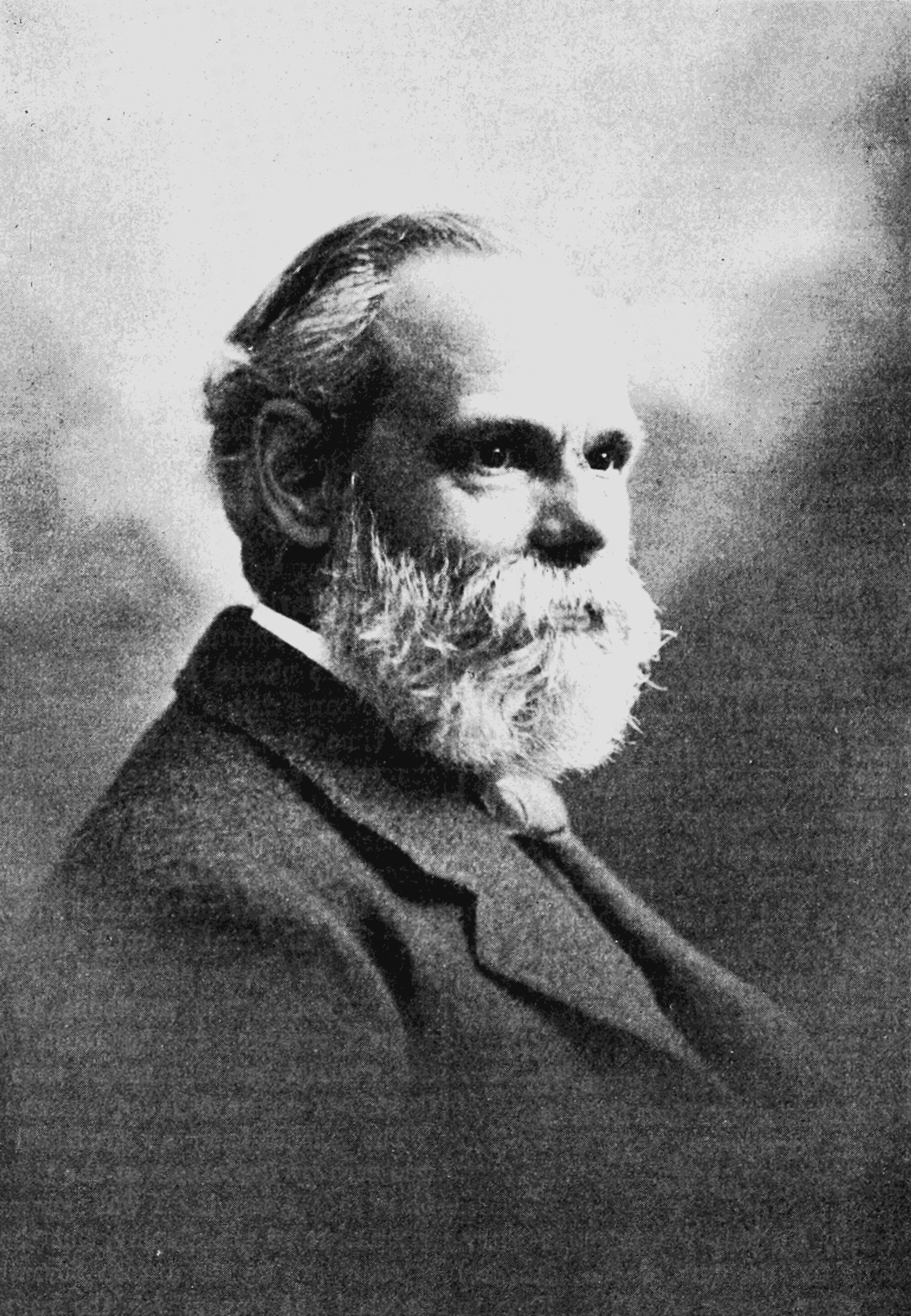
Robert Henry Thurston, 1903

In 1873, he was appointed a member of the United States Scientific Commission to the Vienna Exhibition; served upon the international jury, edited the Report of the Commissioners (in which he published his own report on machinery and manufactures), in five volumes, 1875–6. In 1874 and subsequently he conducted, at the Stevens Institute of Technology, a series of researches on the efficiency of prime movers and machines, and upon the strength and other essential properties of the materials of construction. In 1875, he was appointed a member of the United States Commission on the causes of boiler explosions, and of the Board to test the metals used in construction. He was a member of various scientific associations in the United States, Great Britain, France, and Germany, wrote numerous papers on technical subjects, which appeared in scientific journals in Europe and America, and prepared articles on similar topics for Johnson's Universal Cyclopedia of 1879.

He was made vice-president of the American Institute of Mining Engineers in 1875; he was made vice-president of the American Association for the Advancement of Science, at Nashville, in 1877, in the absence of Professor Pickering, elected at the preceding meeting, and was regularly elected to serve again in 1878, at the St. Louis meeting of the association. From 1880 to 1882 Thurston was the first president of the American Society of Mechanical Engineers. In 1885 he left the Stevens Institute of Technology to replace John Edison Sweet as director of Sibley College at Cornell University, reorganizing it as a college of mechanical engineering.

In 1885, he received an honorary degree from Stevens. In 1902, he was elected as a member to the American Philosophical Society. He died on October 25, 1903, his 64th birthday, in Ithaca, New York.

== Work ==
Thurston's research interest was in the areas of materials, thermodynamics, steam engines and boilers, friction and energetics.

=== Mechanical engineering curriculum ===
At the Stevens Institute of Technology he established Stevens' mechanical engineering curriculum. He was committed to the French and German science-based models of technical education and soon would gain an international reputation for his view of engineering as applied science. His enthusiasm in involving students in funded research led to remarkable pioneering success of the early Stevens' graduates.

Historians credit Thurston with establishing the first US mechanical engineering laboratory for conducting funded research at an academic institution for higher learning.

=== Other papers ===
Thurston wrote a number of papers embodying accounts of original investigations of the strength and other properties of construction materials. Among his numerous inventions are the magnesium ribbon lamp, a magnesium-burning naval and army signal apparatus, an autographic recording testing machine, a new form of steam engine governor, and an apparatus for determining the value of lubricants. In 1875, he also developed the three-coordinate solid diagram for testing iron, steel, and other metals. He made a significant contribution to the field of tribology and Duncan Dowson named him one of the 23 "Men of Tribology".

Thurston pronounced as economically feasible a plan to enable year-round operation of the Erie Canal by the application of artificially generated heat.

=== Patents ===
Thurston held two patents: one for an autographic recording testing machine for material in torsion and the other for a machine for testing lubricants.

== Publications ==
Books, a selection:

- 1878. A history of the growth of the steam engine. D. Appleton and Company; 4th, revised ed. 1902 (online)
- 1884. Stationary steam engines; especially as adapted to electric lighting purposes. New York, J. Wiley & sons, 1884.
- 1884. Materials of Engineering. J. Wiley, 1884, Parts, 1, 2 & 3
- 1889. The development of the philosophy of the steam-engine. An historical sketch. New York, J. Wiley & sons.
- 1890. Heat as a form of energy. Boston and New York, Houghton, Mifflin and company, 1890.
- 1891. A manual of the steam-engine. For engineers and technical schools; advanced courses. New York, J. Wiley & sons, 1891.
- 1894. The animal as a machine and a prime motor, and the laws of energetics. New York, J. Wiley & sons.

Some of his more important papers are the following:

- 1865. On Losses of Propelling Power in the Paddle Wheel
- 1865. Steam Engines of the French Navy
- 1870. H. B. M. Iron Clad Monarch
- 1870. Iron Manufactures in Great Britain
- 1871. Experimental Steam Boiler Explosions
- 1871. Report on Test Trials of Steam Boilers
- 1872. Traction Engines and Road Locomotives
- 1874. Efficiency of Furnaces Burning Wet Fuel
- 1874. The Mechanical Engineer, his Preparation and his Work
- 1877, On a New Method of Planning Researches and of Representing to the Eye the Results of Combination of three or more Elements in Varying Proportions
