= Alan Howard =

Alan Howard may refer to:

- Alan Howard (actor) (1937–2015), English actor
- Alan Howard (cricketer) (1909–1993), English cricketer
- Alan Howard (engineer) (1905–1966), American engineer
- Alan Howard (hedge fund manager) (born 1963), hedge fund manager
- Alan Howard (nutritionist) (1929–2020), English nutritionist
- Alan Howard (dancer) (1931–2003), American ballet dancer, choreographer and teacher
- Alan Howard (Coronation Street)
- Alan Howard (artist), artist; see List of public art in Reading, Berkshire
- Alan Howard (born 1941), English musician, original member of The Tremeloes

== See also ==
- Gregory Allen Howard (born 1962), American screenwriter
