= List of mechanical engineering awards =

This list of mechanical engineering awards is an index to articles about notable awards for mechanical engineering.

== Awards ==
Country	Award	Sponsor	Notes
United States	ASME Burt L. Newkirk Award	American Society of Mechanical Engineers	Individuals under the age of 40 who have made a notable contribution to the field of tribology in research or development
United States	ASME Honorary Member	American Society of Mechanical Engineers	This highest level of membership in ASME is granted for For "distinguished service that contributes significantly to the attainment of the goals of the engineering profession." First awarded in 1880. The ASME Medal ranks closely with honorary membership.
United States	ASME Medal	American Society of Mechanical Engineers	The ASME Medal, established in 1920, is the highest award that the Society can bestow and is to recognize “eminently distinguished engineering achievement.”
United Kingdom	Bessemer Gold Medal	Institute of Materials, Minerals and Mining	Outstanding services to the steel industry
United Kingdom	British Engineering Excellence Awards	Eureka, New Electronics	Engineering design and innovation
United States	Dick Volz Award	Georgia Tech	Outstanding Ph.D. thesis in the field of robotics and automation
United States	Drucker Medal	American Society of Mechanical Engineers	Distinguished contributions to the fields of applied mechanics and mechanical engineering
International	Edison Award	Edison Awards	Honoring excellence in innovation
United States	Edwin F. Church Medal	American Society of Mechanical Engineers	Eminent service in increasing the value, importance and attractiveness of mechanical engineering education
United States	Elmer A. Sperry Award	American Society of Mechanical Engineers	Distinguished engineering contribution which, through application, proved in actual service, has advanced the art of transportation whether by land, sea, air, or space
United Kingdom	Engineering Heritage Awards	Institution of Mechanical Engineers	Artefacts, locations, collections and landmarks of significant engineering importance
United States	Eringen Medal	Society of Engineering Science	Sustained outstanding achievements in Engineering Science
United States	Eshelby Mechanics Award for Young Faculty	American Society of Mechanical Engineers	Junior faculty who exemplify the creative use and development of mechanics
United States	George Westinghouse Medal	American Society of Mechanical Engineers	Eminent achievement or distinguished service in the power field of mechanical engineering
United States	Heat Transfer Memorial Award	American Society of Mechanical Engineers	for outstanding contributions to the field of heat transfer (first awarded in 1961)
United States	Holley Medal	American Society of Mechanical Engineers	Outstanding and unique act(s) of an engineering nature, accomplishing a noteworthy and timely public benefit
United States	Hoover Medal	American Society of Mechanical Engineers	Outstanding extra-career services by engineers to humanity
United States	Hyperloop pod competition	SpaceX	Subscale prototype transport vehicle to demonstrate technical feasibility of various aspects of the Hyperloop concept
United Kingdom	James Watt International Gold Medal	Institution of Mechanical Engineers	Outstanding mechanical engineer
United Kingdom	James Watt Medal	Institution of Civil Engineers	For papers having a substantial mechanical engineering content
United States	Koiter Medal	American Society of Mechanical Engineers	Distinguished work in the field of solid mechanics
United States	Max Jakob Memorial Award	American Society of Mechanical Engineers	Eminent scholarly achievement and distinguished leadership in the field of heat transfer
United States	Mayo D. Hersey Award	American Society of Mechanical Engineers	Bestowed on an individual in recognition of distinguished and continued contributions over a substantial period of time to the advancement of the science and engineering of tribology.
United States	Mechanisms and Robotics Award	American Society of Mechanical Engineers	Lifelong contribution to the field of mechanism design or theory
United States	Percy Nicholls Award	American Society of Mechanical Engineers, American Institute of Mining, Metallurgical, and Petroleum Engineers.	Notable scientific or industrial achievement in the field of solid fuels
Japan	Robot Award	Ministry of Economy, Trade and Industry	Robots that have made, or are highly likely to make, significant contribution to future market development
United States	Rufus Oldenburger Medal	American Society of Mechanical Engineers	Significant contributions and outstanding achievements in the field of automatic control
United States	Ted Belytschko Applied Mechanics Award	American Society of Mechanical Engineers	Significant contributions in the practice of engineering mechanics
United States	Thomas J.R. Hughes Young Investigator Award	American Society of Mechanical Engineers	Young investigators in Applied Mechanics
United States	Thomas K. Caughey Dynamics Award	American Society of Mechanical Engineers	Significant contributions to the field of nonlinear dynamics
United States	Timoshenko Medal	American Society of Mechanical Engineers	Distinguished contributions to the field of applied mechanics
United Kingdom	Tribology Gold Medal	Institution of Mechanical Engineers	Outstanding and supreme achievement in the field of tribology.
United Kingdom	Whitworth Scholarship	Whitworth Society, Institution of Mechanical Engineers	Outstanding engineers, who have excellent academic and practical skills and the qualities needed to succeed in industry
United States	William Prager Medal	Society of Engineering Science	outstanding research contributions in either theoretical or experimental Solid Mechanics or both
United States	Worcester Reed Warner Medal	American Society of Mechanical Engineers	For seminal contribution to the permanent literature of mechanical engineering.

== See also ==
- Lists of awards
- Lists of science and technology awards
- List of engineering awards
