= Stephen J. Pigott =

American marine engineer

Sir Stephen Joseph Pigott (January 30, 1880 – February 27, 1955) was an American-born British mechanical and marine engineer, and managing director of the Scottish shipbuilding firm John Brown & Company. He was awarded the ASME Medal in 1938.

Pigott was born in Cornwall, New York, where he attended the local High School. Afterwards he started to work in various engineering jobs, among others at the Columbia Electric Vehicle Company and at the E. W. Bliss Company in Brooklyn. After three years he started to study mechanical and marine engineering at the Columbia University, where he obtained his engineering degree in 1903.

After his graduation in 1903 he became assistant to Charles Gordon Curtis, assisting in the development of the impulse turbine for marine propulsion. In 1908 he moved to England on invitation of the British Admiralty, where he started his lifelong career working at the Scottish marine engineering and shipbuilding firm John Brown & Company. He worked his way up from designer to manager of the engine works, to local director in 1920. In 1934 he was appointed director, and in 1935 managing director, where he served until his retirement in 1948.

His daughter Nancy married American politician Estes Kefauver.
