= Dornbrook =

Dornbrook is a surname. Notable people with the surname include:

- Fred L. Dornbrook (1875–1967), American mechanical engineer and inventor
- Thom Dornbrook (born 1956), American football player
