= Armacost =

Armacost is a surname. It is a variant of the Americanized German surname Armagost. Notable people with the surname include:

- Audrey Mika Armacost (born 2000), American singer and songwriter
- Austin Armacost (born 1988), American TV personality and model
- Michael Armacost (1937–2025), American diplomat
- Samuel Armacost (born 1940), American businessman, former CEO of BankAmerica Corporation
- Wilbur H. Armacost (1893–1971), American mechanical engineer
