= Église Notre-Dame de l'Assomption, Rouffach =

Coordinates: 47°57′24″N 7°18′01″E

- Église paroissiale Notre-Dame de l'Assomption; Église Saint-Arbogast
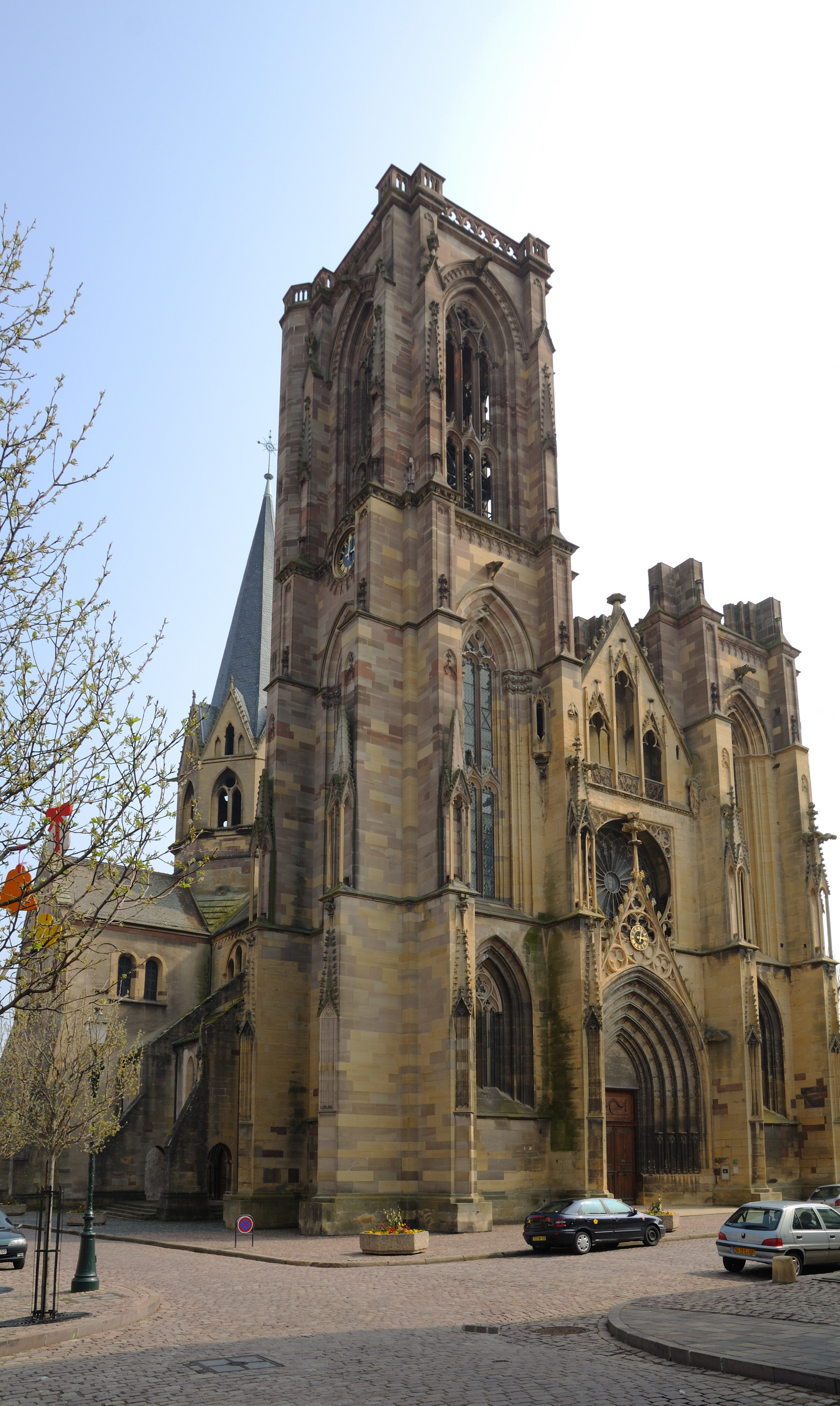
- Église Notre-Dame de l'Assomption, Rouffach
- Location: Rouffach
- Country: France
- Denomination: Roman Catholic Church
- Website: https://paroisses-rouffach-nds.org/

History
- Status: parish church
- Founded: 1050

Architecture
- Heritage designation: Monument historique
- Designated: 1841
- Architectural type: church
- Style: Romanesque architecture Gothic architecture Gothic revival architecture
- Completed: never

Specifications
- Length: 68 metres (223 ft)
- Width: 36 metres (118 ft)
- Height: 68 metres (223 ft)

Administration
- Archdiocese: Strasbourg
- Parish: Communauté de Paroisses de Rouffach

The Église Notre-Dame de l'Assomption (Our Lady of the Assumption Church) is a Roman Catholic parish church of the town of Rouffach in southern Alsace. It is one of the largest medieval churches in the Haut-Rhin département of France. The church is also known as Saint-Arbogast Church (Église Saint-Arbogast). It lies on the "Route Romane d'Alsace". Although work started in the 11th century and was carried on with interruptions until 1870, the building remains unfinished.

== History and architecture ==
The church is made of yellow and pink sandstone and was built in the Romanesque and Gothic styles, with Neo-Gothic additions. The oldest part of the building, the transept, dates from the second half of the 11th century; the nave is from the 12th and 13th century and displays both late Romanesque walls and early Gothic side portals; the choir is in late Gothic style. Work on the building both outside and inside continued until 1508; however, the twin-towered façade remained unfinished. A rood screen that had been built around 1300 was demolished in the 18th century and only two lateral staircases remain. Notre-Dame de l'Assomption suffered severe damage during the French Revolution and now appears relatively unadorned on both the outside and the inside. The large-scale volume of the church and the presence of several medieval building styles appear all the more evidently to the visitor. The Church is listed as a Monument historique since 1841 by the French Ministry of Culture. A comprehensive restoration of the building, which was undertaken from 1866 by the French architect Maximilien Émile Mimey, had to be stopped in 1870 because of the outbreak of the Franco-Prussian War. The planned heightening and completion of the double-towered façade was never carried out. Only the crest of the north tower was completed, in pink Vosges sandstone, in striking colour contrast to the yellow tower base. A sacristy was added to the building after 1918.
The north tower is 56 m (184 ft) high, the south tower only 42 m (138 ft). The top of the octagonal crossing tower, which was restored in 1854, reaches a height of 68 m (223 ft). The total exterior length of the church is 68 meters as well, and the total interior length is 64 m (210 ft). The interior width of the nave is 20 m (66 ft), and 28 m (92 ft) at the transept. The maximal exterior width is 36 m (118 ft).

== Furnishing ==
The great façade portal was vandalized during the French Revolution, when the statues and other sculptures that adorned it were shattered. On the front gable and the clerestory area, as well as on top of the apse, regions too high to be reached by ladder, some sculptures are still to be seen. Inside, some late gothic capitals – among which the "Rouffach smile" (sourire de Rouffach), the smiling heads of a young girl and a young boy facing each other – still testify to the ornamental style employed by some of the church's designers.

Rouffach's main church owns a pipe organ from the year 1855 (a work by Claude-Ignace Callinet) in which some of the pipes from the previous organ, of 1626, are still to be found. These are the oldest still-functioning organ pipes of Alsace. The rose window of the façade (14th century) is, by the number of lancets composing it (20) as well as by overall design, the most complex in Alsace, before the much larger one of Strasbourg Cathedral, which has only 16 lancets. Apart from the baptismal font, the tabernacle and the tombstone of the knight Werner Falk, all three in an ornate Gothic style, the rest of the interior furnishing is mainly Neo-Gothic.

== Gallery ==
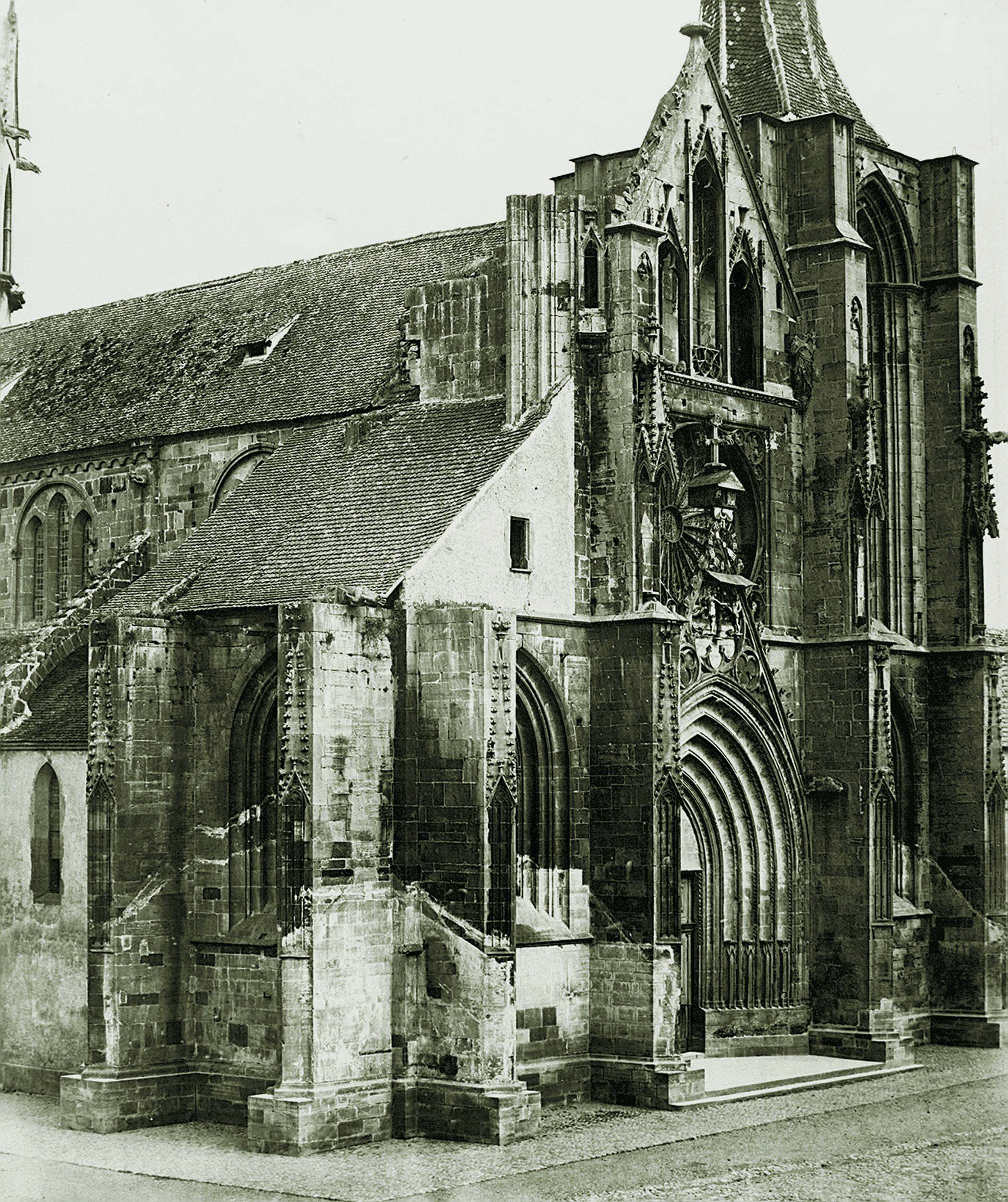
The church in 1859, without the unfinished twin towers

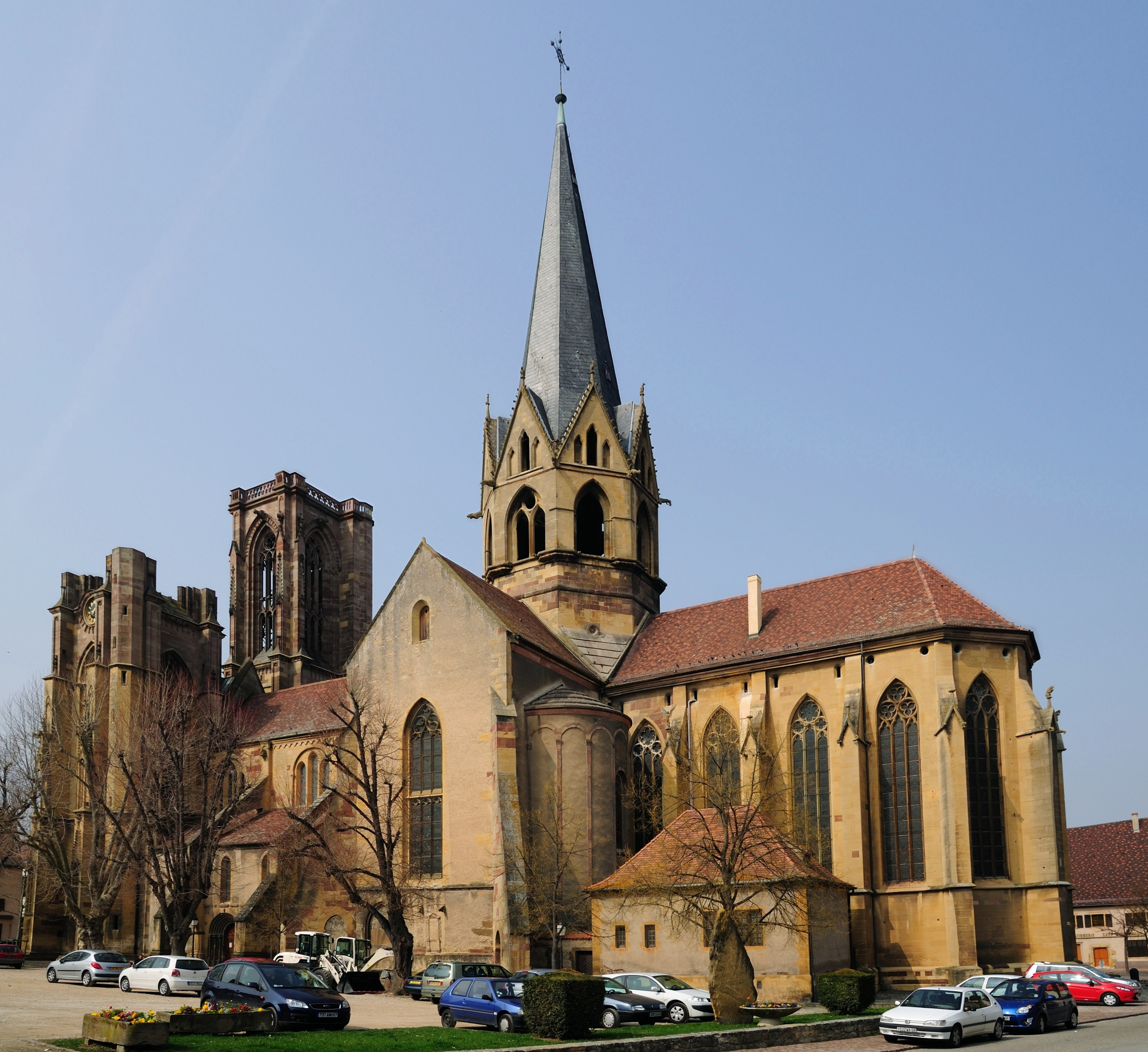
South East side of the church

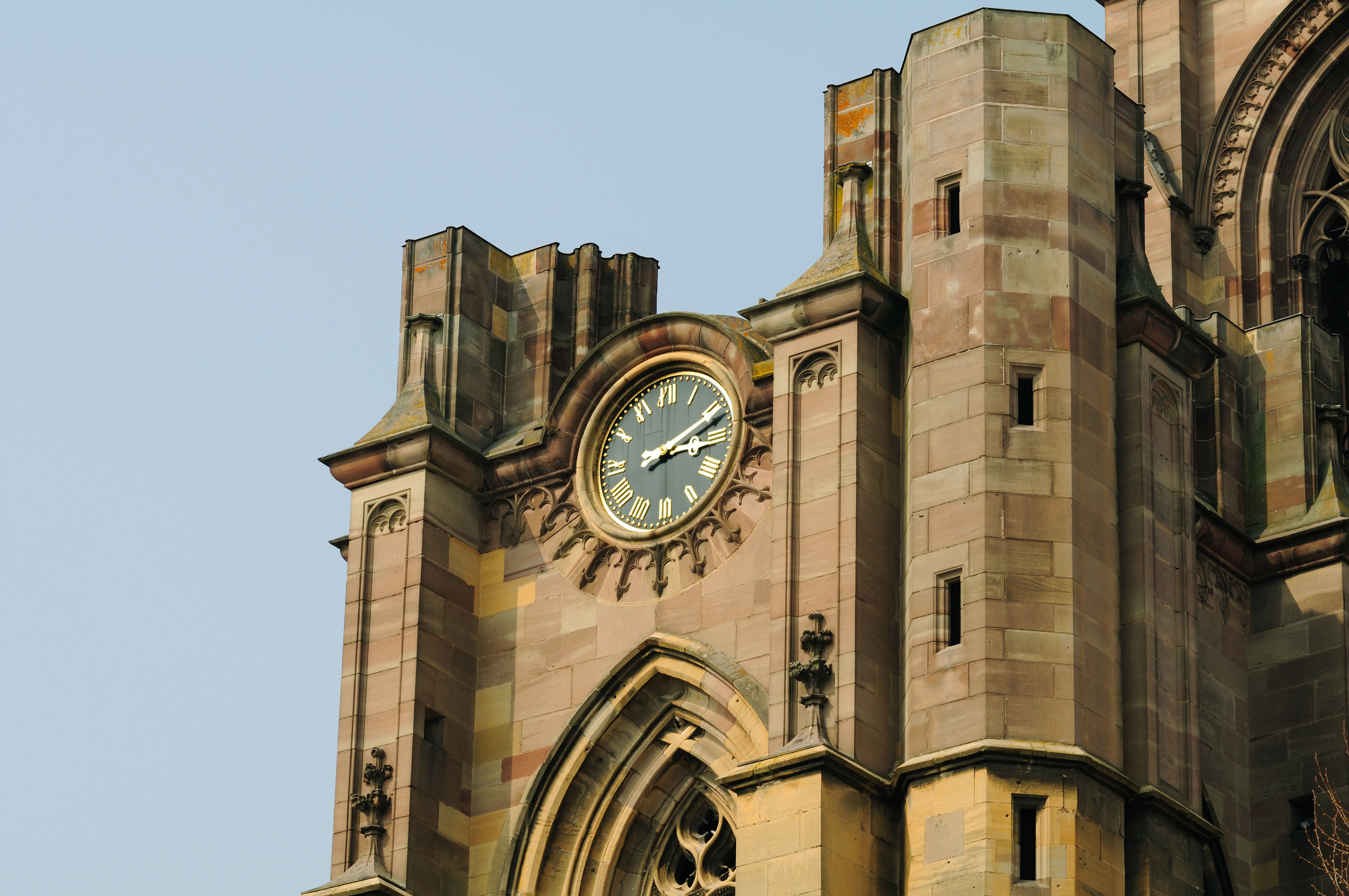
Clock on the unfinished tower

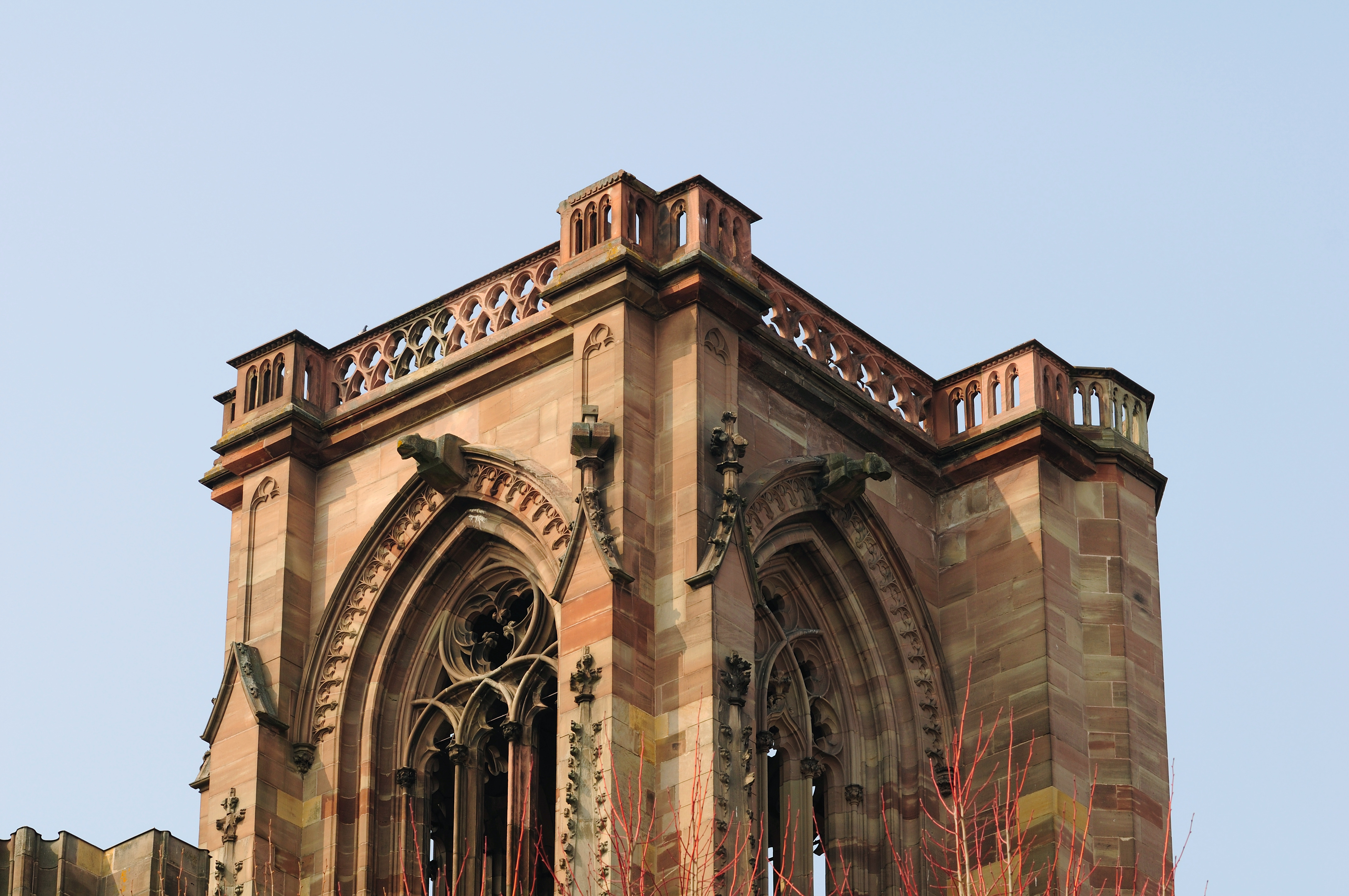
Top of the finished tower

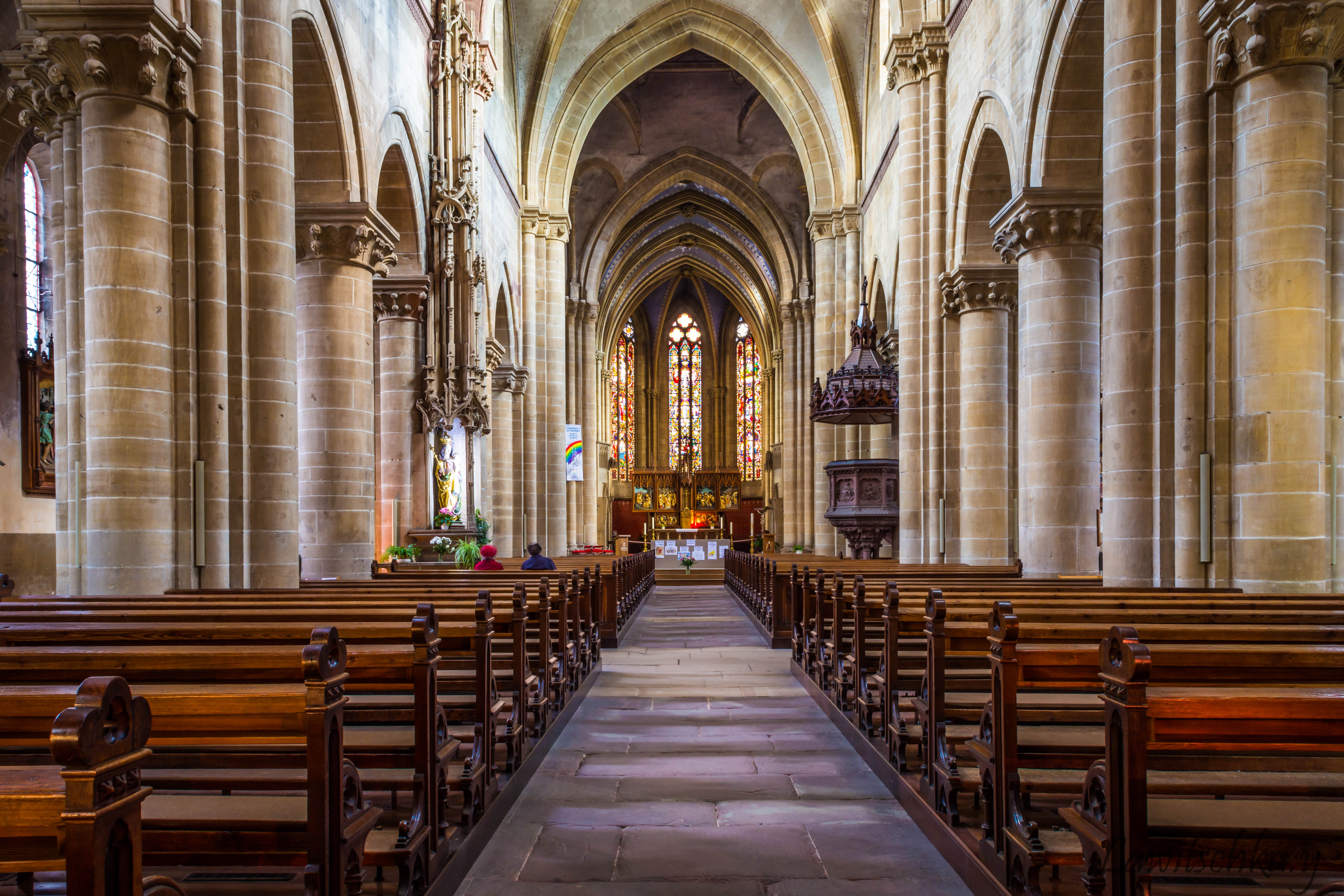
Inside view towards the choir. Opposite the pulpit is the tabernacle.

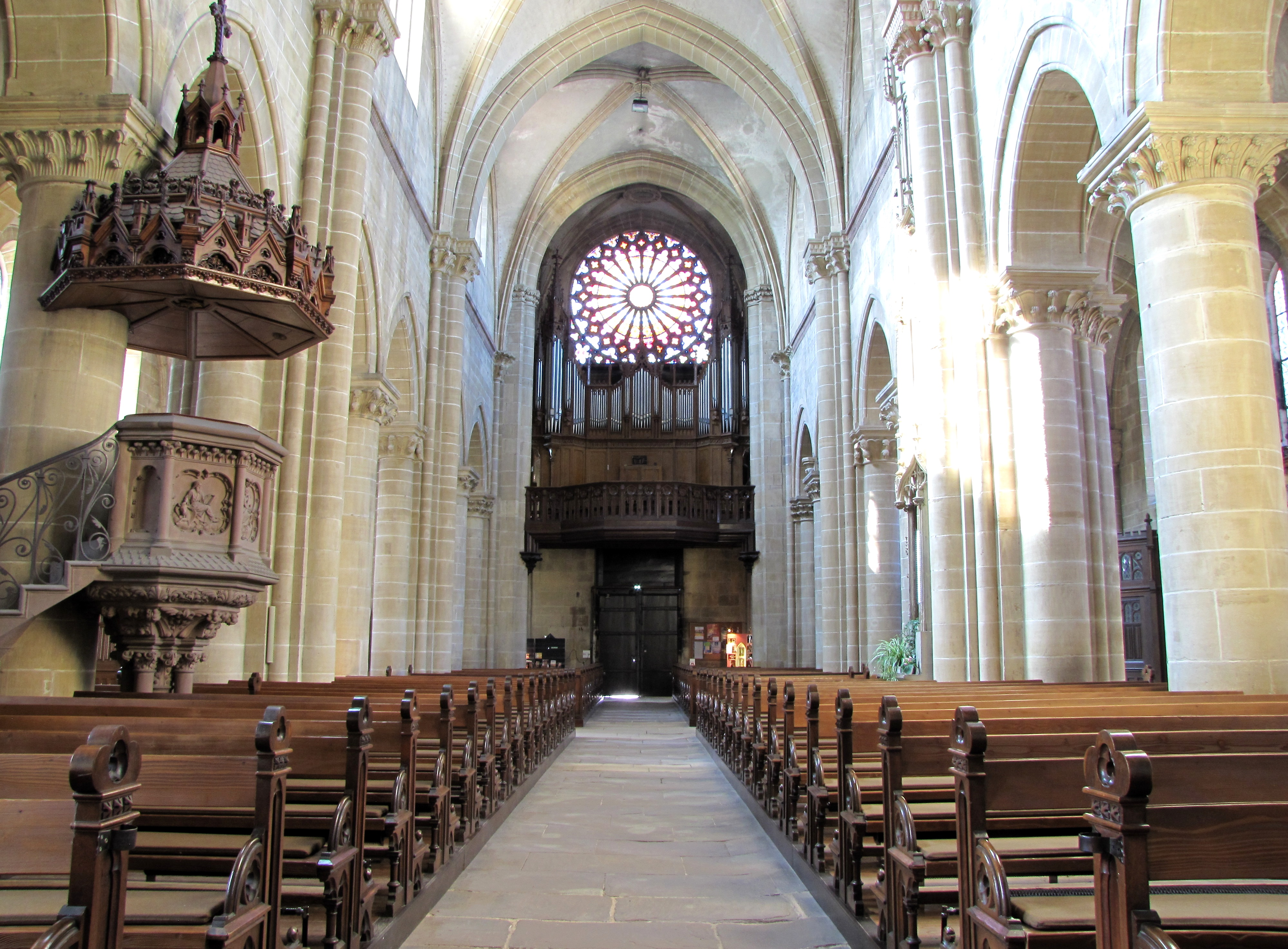
Inside view towards the pipe organ and the rose window
