= Armagost =

Armagost is a surname. It is the Americanized version of the German surname Arbogast. Notable people with the surname include:

- Jason Armagost, United States Air Force major general who serves as the commander of the Eighth Air Force
- Ryan Armagost, American representative for District 64 of the Colorado House of Representatives

== See also ==
- Mount Armagost
- Armacost, variant form
