= Kate Bellingham =

British engineer and television presenter

Katherine Bellingham, FWES (born 1963) is a British engineer and television presenter known for her role presenting the BBC1 science show Tomorrow's World from 1990 to 1994. She champions science education and in particular, the participation of women in science and engineering. Bellingham has received numerous awards and honorary degrees for her efforts in STEM communication.

== Early life ==
Bellingham was born in Buckrose, East Riding of Yorkshire, and educated at the independent Mount School in York. She subsequently studied at Oxford University where she graduated with a BA in Physics in 1984. In 2003, she received an MSc degree in Electronic Communications Systems Engineering from the University of Hertfordshire.

== Career ==
=== Broadcasting ===
Bellingham was a BBC radio engineer working in the BBC Broadcasting House in 1988 when she was selected to co-host the annual Faraday Lecture sponsored by the Institution of Electrical Engineers – a tour of live shows for school pupils around the UK. A BBC Schools producer saw her perform and she was offered a presenting role on a new Design and Technology programme called Techno.

She returned to her engineering training, but then applied for Tomorrow's World and joined the team of presenters working on the show in 1990 for four years.

Programmes she has presented include:

- Radio Five Live – The Acid Test from 1994 to 1997 and Splitting the Difference in 1996
- BBC School Radio
- Radio 4 – Testing Times (four-part series in November 1999)
- BBC2 – Working in Engineering in 1999
- The Open University
- Children's ITV – The Big Bang from 1996 to 2004
- BBC Schools - Showcase - A preview programme detailing various subjects.

After around five years of regular television work, hosting numerous live events and presenting corporate video programmes, Bellingham decided to focus first on her young family and then to follow her core professional interest by returning to university to secure an MSc in Electronics.

=== Promotion of engineering (especially for women) ===
She trained and then worked as a maths teacher until July 2007, but returned to media work and to promoting STEM (science, technology, engineering and maths) to general public audiences, particularly school pupils. She is the DCSF's STEM Careers Champion (NSCC), Education Ambassador for the Bloodhound Engineering Adventure. Bellingham returned to TV screens in March 2010 as a regular co-presenter for Museum of Life, a documentary series for BBC2 about the Natural History Museum. She was one of the celebrity judges at the National Science + Engineering Competition at The Big Bang Fair in March 2012, which rewards students who have achieved excellence in a science, technology, engineering or maths project and awarded prizes for the Talent 2030 National Engineering Competition for Girls in 2015.

She was also involved with the British Engineering Excellence Awards (BEEAs) in October 2010, an event, organised by British-based Eureka and New Electronics, which aims to promote the engineering achievements of British companies. During the awards Kate wore the "e-dress" (designed by Abigail Williams from Amman Valley School and created by Francesca Rosella and Ryan Genz of CuteCircuit), discussed the role of Design Technology (DT) in schools and its significance to British Engineering in the future.

== Awards ==
In 1997, Bellingham was awarded the honorary degree of Doctor of Technology (Hon DTech) from the University of Staffordshire. In 2004, she received the Public Promotion of Engineering Medal by the Royal Academy of Engineering. In 2011, she was awarded a Women of Outstanding Achievement Award, partly in recognition for her work as National STEM Coordinator for Sheffield Hallam University's Centre for Science Education. In 2012, she was awarded an honorary Doctor of Science degree (Hon DSc) by the University of West of England. Bellingham received an honorary Doctorate of Science (Hon DSc) from the University of Kent in 2013, in recognition of her contribution to the public understanding of science and science education. She also was awarded in 2014 an honorary Doctorate of Technology (Hon DTech) from De Montfort University as well an honorary Doctor of Science degree (Hon DSc) from the University of Hull. In 2015, she was elected a Fellow of the Women’s Engineering Society (FWES) and awarded an Honorary Doctorate of Engineering (Hon DEng) by the University of Bradford.

She is President of Young Engineers, the national network of engineering clubs in schools and colleges. She is also a Patron of WISE, a charitable organization that encourages young women to pursue careers in Science, Engineering and Construction.

== Personal life ==
Bellingham is married to BBC maintenance engineer, Martin Young. They have two children and settled in Hertfordshire.
