= Glenn Warren =

Glenn Warren may refer to:

- Glenn E. Warren (born 1943), American politician in the New York State Assembly
- Glenn B. Warren (1898–1979), American mechanical engineer, business executive and inventor
