= Alan Howard (cricketer) =

English cricketer

Personal information
- Full name: Alan Raymond Howard
- Born: 11 December 1909; Leicester, Leicestershire, England
- Died: March 1993 (aged 83); Hanworth, Middlesex, England
- Batting: Left-handed
- Bowling: Left-arm medium
- Relatives: Arthur Howard (father); Jack Howard brother

Domestic team information
- Years: Team
- 1930: Wales
- 1928–1933: Glamorgan

Career statistics
Competition	First-class
Matches	60
Runs scored	1,181
Batting average	12.17
100s/50s	–/3
Top score	63
Balls bowled	108
Wickets	0
Bowling average	–
5 wickets in innings	–
10 wickets in match	–
Best bowling	–
Catches/stumpings	35/–
- Source: Cricinfo, 20 June 2012

Alan Raymond Howard (11 December 1909 – March 1993) was an English cricketer. Howard was a left-handed batsman who bowled left-arm medium pace. He was born at Leicester, Leicestershire.

Howard made his first-class debut for Glamorgan against Worcestershire at New Road, Worcester, in the 1927 County Championship. A semi-regular in the Glamorgan side, he made 58 further first-class appearances for the county, the last of which came against Lancashire at Old Trafford in the 1933 County Championship. Howard's role within the Glamorgan team was as a batsman, in that role he scored 1,181 runs in his 59 first-class matches for the county, which came at an average of 12.13, with a high score of 63. One of three half centuries he made for Glamorgan, this score came against Derbyshire in 1930. He also made a single first-class appearance for Wales against the Marylebone Cricket Club in 1930 at Lord's. In a match which Wales lost by an innings and 44 runs, Howard made scores of 6 and 22.

He died in March 1993 at Hanworth, Middlesex. His father, Arthur, and brother, Jack, both played first-class cricket for Leicestershire.
