= Rouffach =

Commune in Grand Est, France

- Commune
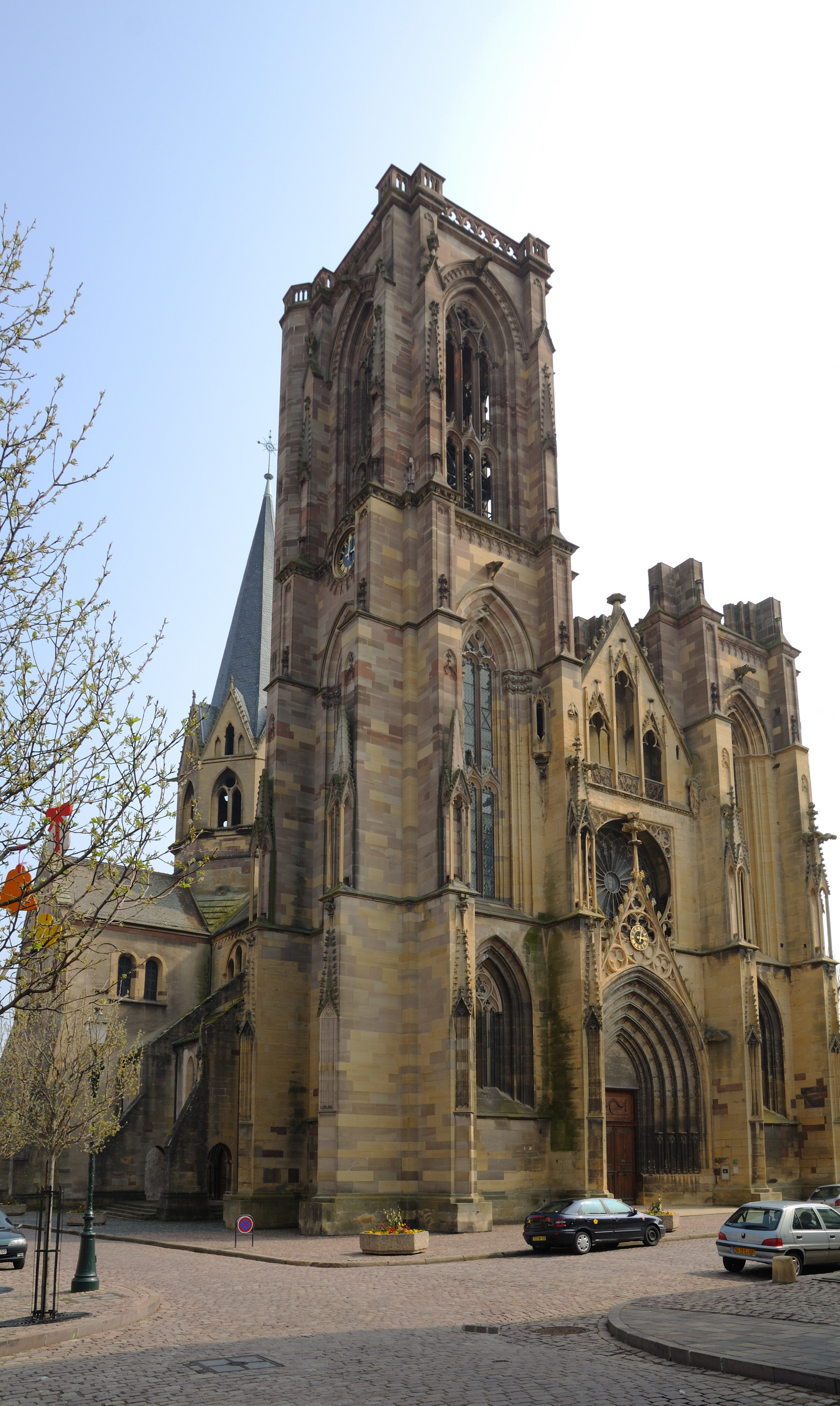
- The church in Rouffach

- Coat of arms
- Location of Rouffach
- Location within France Location within Grand Est
- Coordinates: 47°57′30″N 7°17′54″E
- Country: France
- Region: Grand Est
- Department: Haut-Rhin
- Arrondissement: Thann-Guebwiller
- Canton: Wintzenheim
- Intercommunality: Pays de Rouffach, Vignobles et Châteaux

Government
  - Mayor (2020–2026): Jean-Pierre Toucas
- Area^{1}: 40.05 km^{2} (15.46 sq mi)
- Elevation: 210 m (690 ft)
- Highest elevation: 980 m (3,220 ft)
- Lowest elevation: 195 m (640 ft)
- Population (2023): 4,238
  - Density: 105.8/km^{2} (274.1/sq mi)
- Time zone: UTC+01:00 (CET)
  - Summer (DST): UTC+02:00 (CEST)
- INSEE/Postal code: 68287 /68250
- ^{1} French Land Register data, which excludes lakes, ponds, glaciers > 1 km^{2} (0.386 sq mi or 247 acres) and river estuaries.

Rouffach (French pronunciation: [ʁufak]; German and Alsatian: Rufach) is a commune in the Haut-Rhin department in Grand Est in north-eastern France.

Rouffach lies along the Alsatian wine route (Route des Vins d'Alsace). Its vineyards produce one of the finest Alsatian wines: the Grand Cru Vorbourg.

== Geography ==
Rouffach is situated on the Lauch River, 15 km (9.3 mi) south of Colmar and 28 km (17 mi) north of Mulhouse, on the vineyards of the eastern foothills of the Vosges Mountains. The most important transportation routes between the towns are the N83 (Lyon–Strasbourg) and the railway line Strasbourg-Mulhouse-Basel.

=== Climate ===
Rouffach has an oceanic climate (Köppen climate classification Cfb). The average annual temperature in Rouffach is 11.2 °C (52.2 °F). The average annual rainfall is 629.0 mm (24.76 in) with May as the wettest month. The temperatures are highest on average in July, at around 20.3 °C (68.5 °F), and lowest in January, at around 1.9 °C (35.4 °F). The highest temperature ever recorded in Rouffach was 39.3 °C (102.7 °F) on 13 August 2003; the coldest temperature ever recorded was −17.5 °C (0.5 °F) on 13 January 1987.

Climate data for Rouffach (1981–2010 averages, extremes 1986−present)
Month	Jan	Feb	Mar	Apr	May	Jun	Jul	Aug	Sep	Oct	Nov	Dec	Year
Record high °C (°F)	18.8 (65.8)	21.5 (70.7)	26.2 (79.2)	29.5 (85.1)	34.0 (93.2)	37.7 (99.9)	38.0 (100.4)	39.3 (102.7)	33.5 (92.3)	29.1 (84.4)	23.1 (73.6)	17.2 (63.0)	39.3 (102.7)
Mean daily maximum °C (°F)	4.6 (40.3)	6.9 (44.4)	11.2 (52.2)	15.8 (60.4)	20.1 (68.2)	23.5 (74.3)	25.6 (78.1)	25.3 (77.5)	20.7 (69.3)	15.4 (59.7)	9.1 (48.4)	5.2 (41.4)	15.3 (59.5)
Daily mean °C (°F)	1.9 (35.4)	3.5 (38.3)	7.1 (44.8)	11.0 (51.8)	15.2 (59.4)	18.4 (65.1)	20.3 (68.5)	19.9 (67.8)	15.9 (60.6)	11.4 (52.5)	6.2 (43.2)	2.7 (36.9)	11.2 (52.2)
Mean daily minimum °C (°F)	−0.8 (30.6)	0.1 (32.2)	3.0 (37.4)	6.2 (43.2)	10.3 (50.5)	13.3 (55.9)	15.0 (59.0)	14.6 (58.3)	11.0 (51.8)	7.5 (45.5)	3.2 (37.8)	0.1 (32.2)	7.0 (44.6)
Record low °C (°F)	−17.5 (0.5)	−14.7 (5.5)	−12.5 (9.5)	−3.5 (25.7)	0.2 (32.4)	4.2 (39.6)	7.4 (45.3)	6.0 (42.8)	2.0 (35.6)	−4.4 (24.1)	−10.2 (13.6)	−17.0 (1.4)	−17.5 (0.5)
Average precipitation mm (inches)	35.6 (1.40)	30.5 (1.20)	37.6 (1.48)	40.8 (1.61)	76.0 (2.99)	63.2 (2.49)	67.8 (2.67)	69.8 (2.75)	55.7 (2.19)	62.4 (2.46)	42.6 (1.68)	47.0 (1.85)	629.0 (24.76)
Average precipitation days (≥ 1.0 mm)	6.9	7.6	7.7	8.5	11.3	9.8	9.7	10.2	7.7	9.7	8.4	8.7	105.9
Source: Météo France

== Population ==
Historical population
Year	Pop.	±% p.a.
1968	5,053	—
1975	4,768	−0.83%
1982	4,615	−0.46%
1990	4,303	−0.87%
1999	4,187	−0.30%
2007	4,664	+1.36%
2012	4,561	−0.45%
2017	4,518	−0.19%
2023	4,238	−1.06%
Source: INSEE

== Etymology ==
in pago qui vocatur Rubiaco (charter, 662), Rubiacum 12th century, Rufiacum 13th century. In records of the diocese of Strasbourg it is called Upper Mundat.

The name derives from the Gallo-Roman male's name Rubbius or Rubius ending with Celtic suffix -āko > -acum (cf. Welsh -og).

Similar place-names in France : Royat (Rubiacum 1147), Robiac (Robiaco 1119).

== History ==
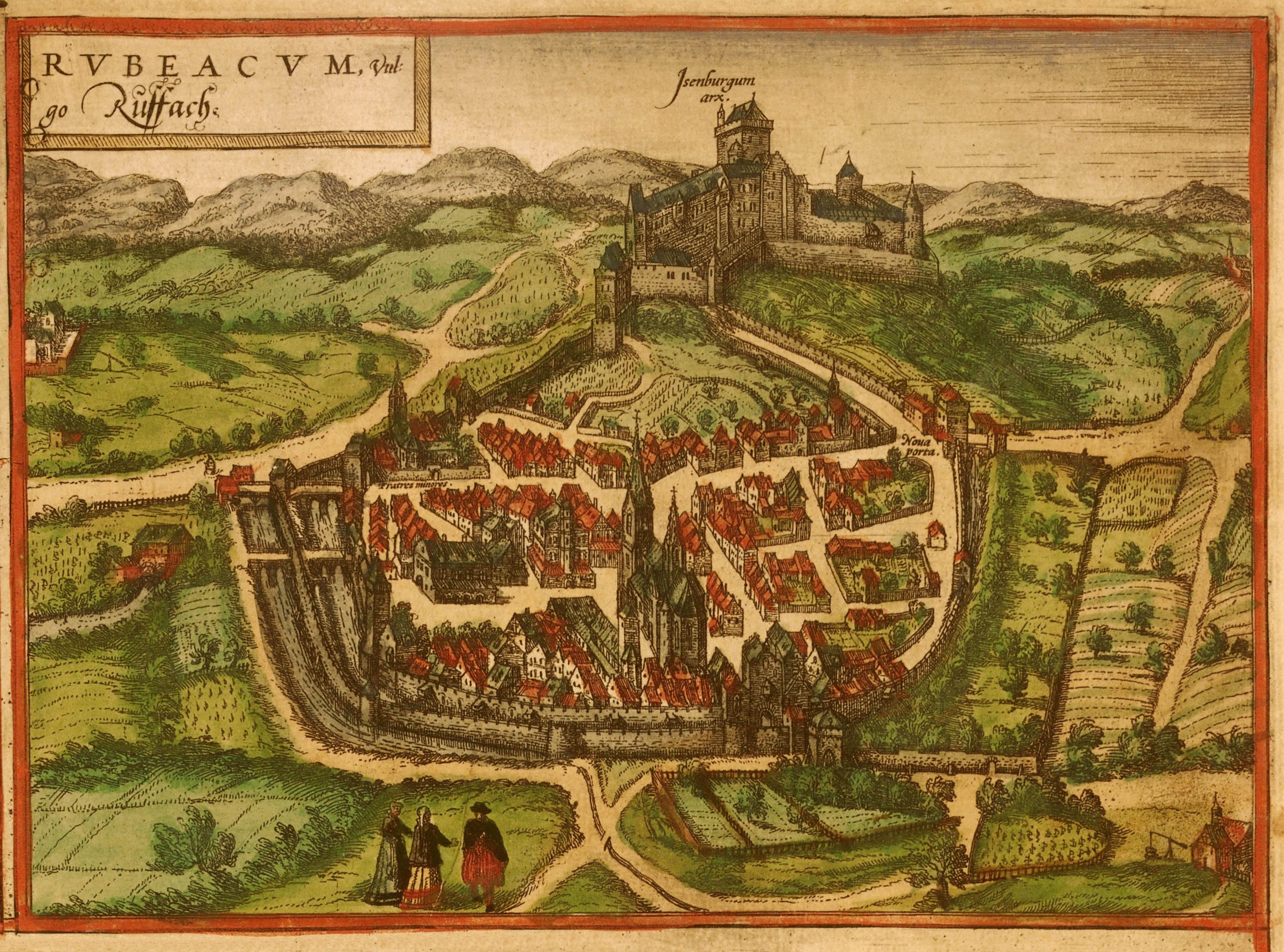
View of Rouffach & Isenburg according to Frans Hogenberg (about 1570)

In the 5th century, the walled village (oppidum) beneath the stronghold of Isenburg was a residence of the Merovingian kings. According to pious legend recorded in the chronicle of Ebersmunster, the son of King Dagobert II gave the city to Arbogast, bishop of Strasbourg, in the 7th century, after the bishop had re-awakened his son Sigebert from death in a hunting incident. More certainly the fief was one of the most ancient belonging to Strasbourg. It finally became the main town of an episocopal fief, which also included Eguisheim. The city quickly developed and a wall was built around it.

The golden age ended abruptly with the Thirty Years' War, when the town was devastated by the Swedes. Archduke Leopold Wilhelm of Austria held court in the city when he was in Alsace. At the end of the war, when Alsace was conquered by France, the fief was abolished. The city again achieved prosperity, chiefly due to wine growing and the production of kirsch from the cherry orchards connected with the chateau, and because it was spared during the following wars.

During the time of Nazi annexation, a Nationalpolitische Erziehungsanstalt (National Political Institute of Education, NEPA, popularly known as Napola) was housed in a former sanatorium of the city (as of October 1940).

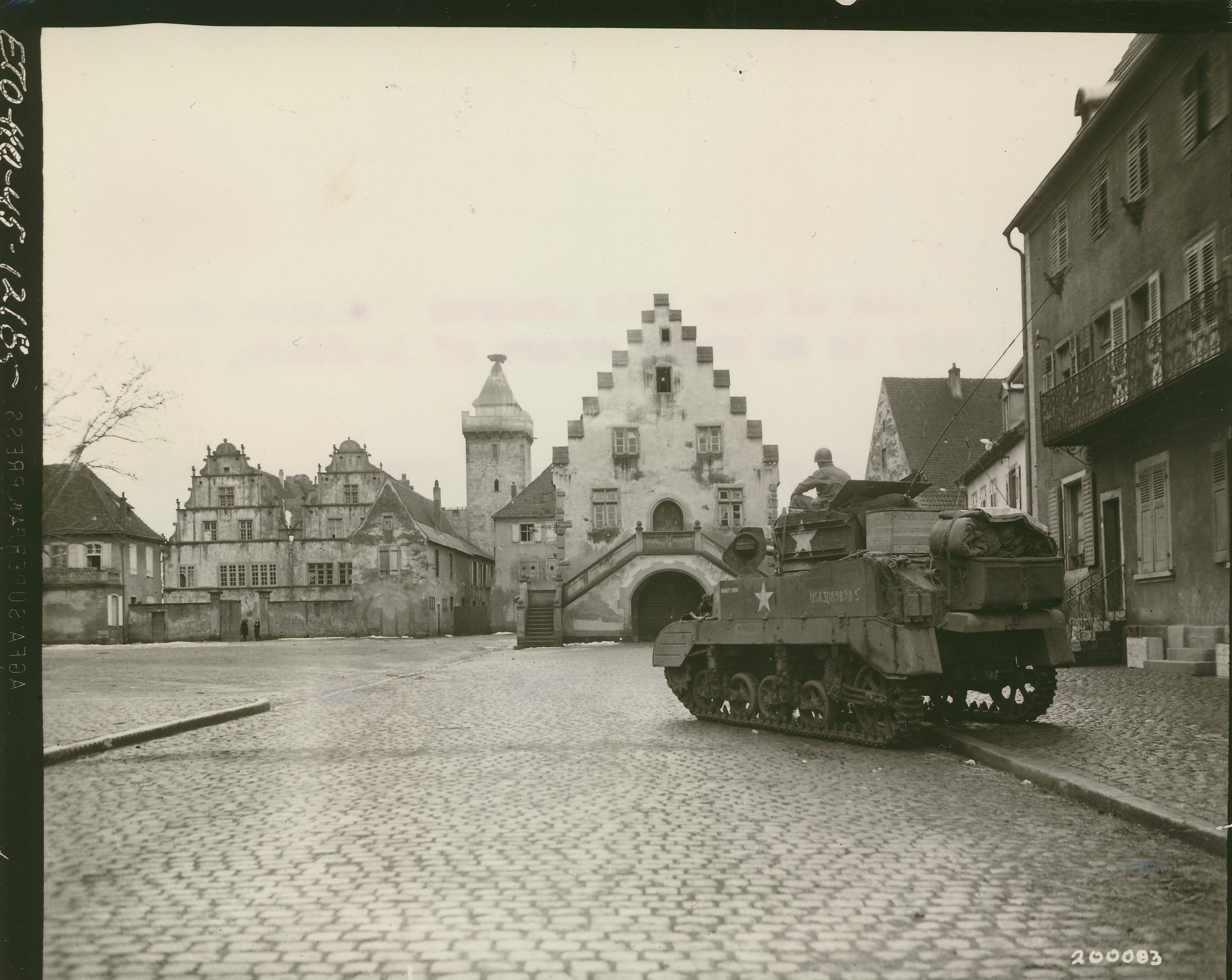
A light tank of the 12th Armored Division in Rouffach, 5 Feb. 1945

== Sightseeing ==
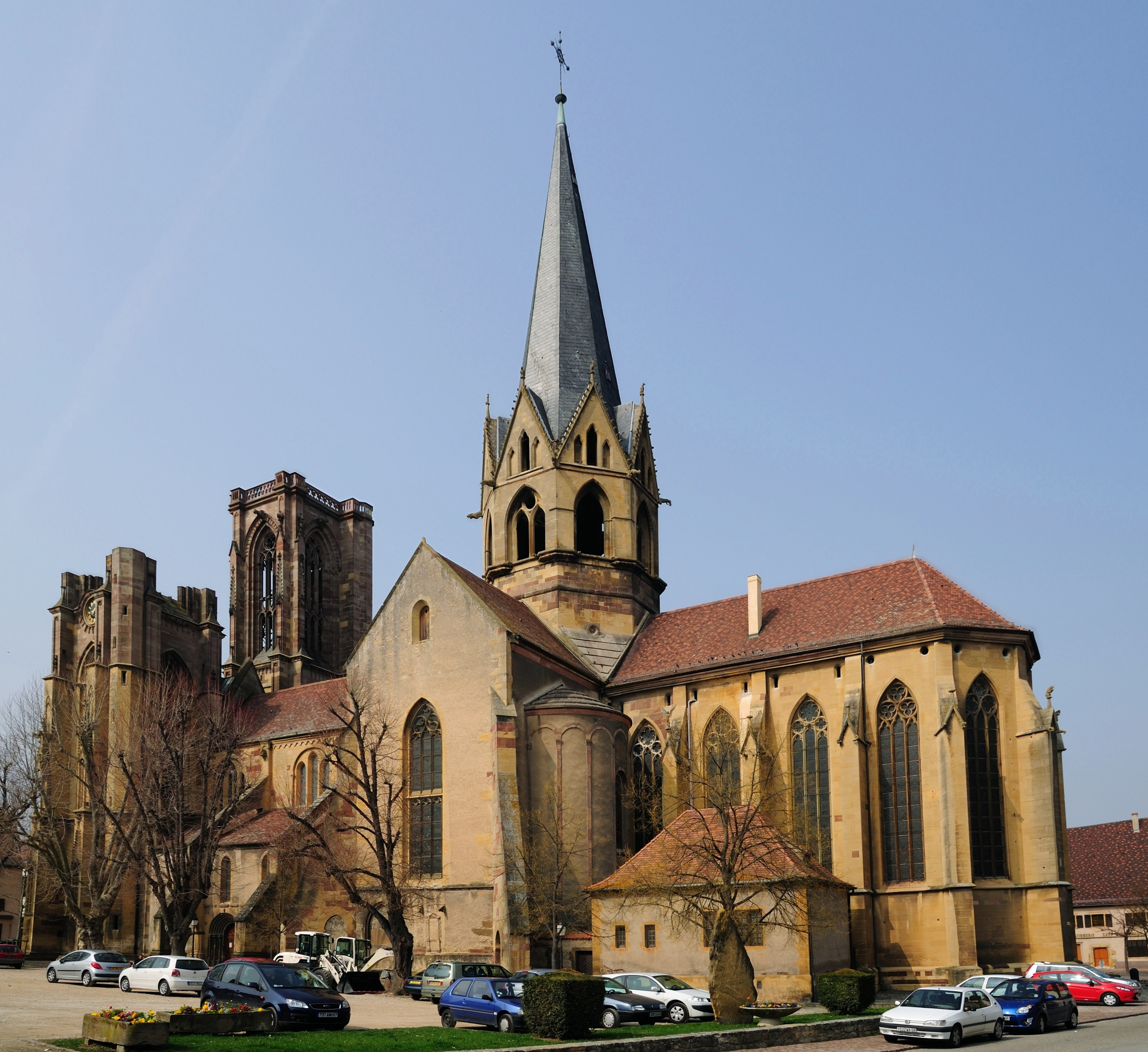
South side of Notre Dame

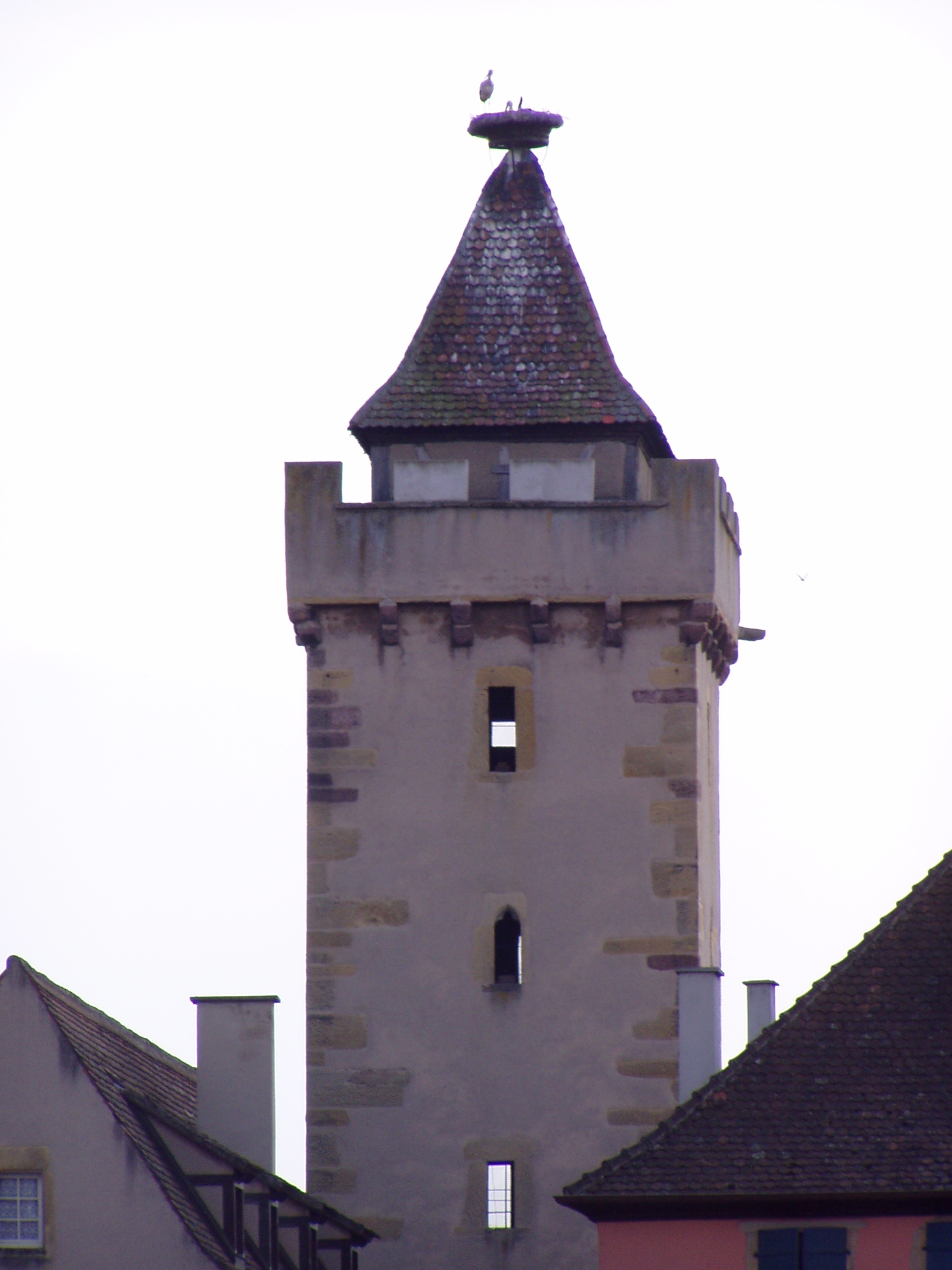
Witch tower with stork's nest

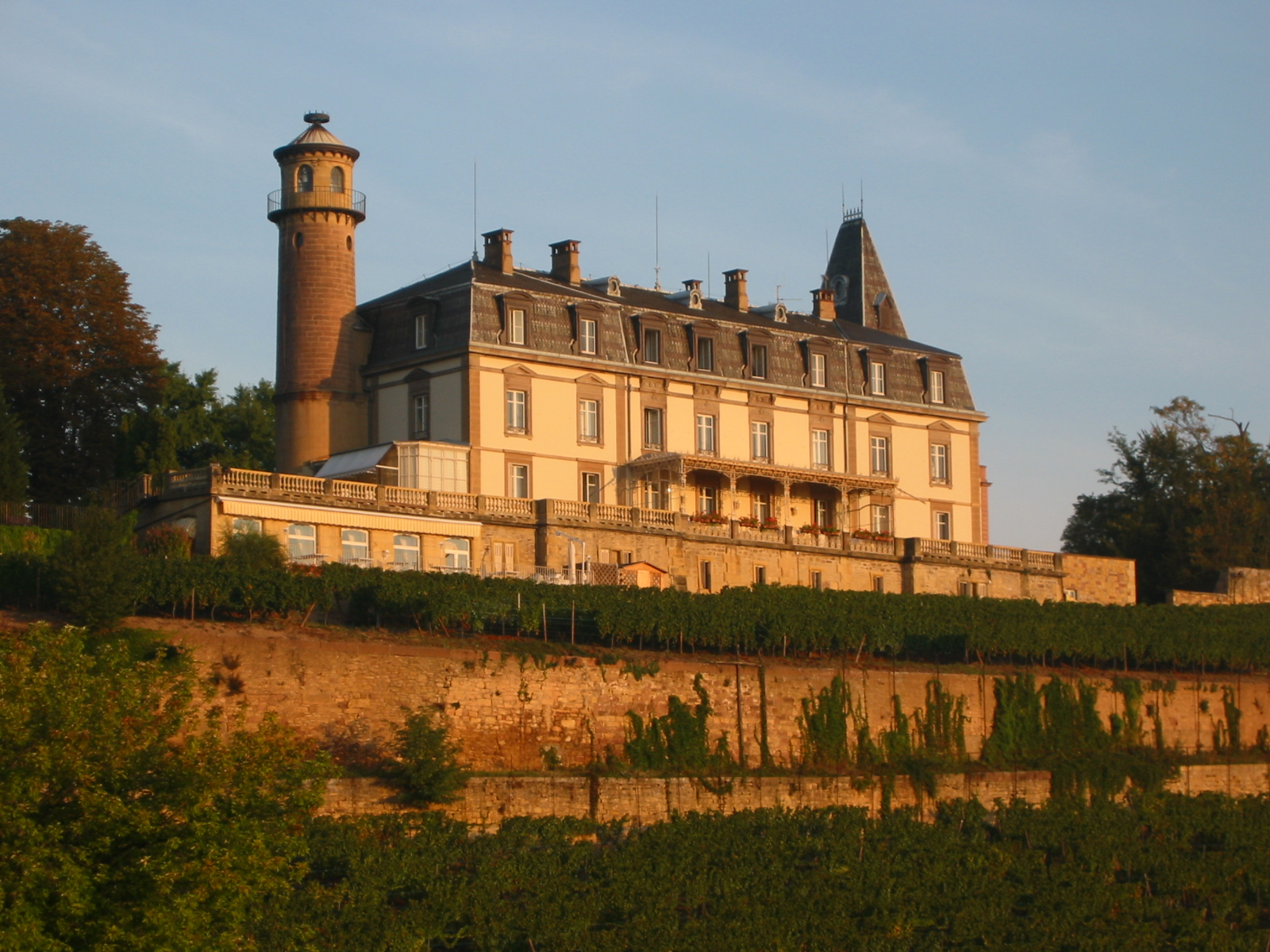
Isenbourg castle

Rouffach is a station on the Romanesque Route of Alsace (Route Romane d'Alsace).

- The Notre-Dame de l’Assomption Church of yellow sandstone was built in the Romanesque and Gothic styles. The transept is from the second half of the 11th century, the Gothic nave is from the 12th and 13th centuries, with Romanesque side portals. Construction on the building continued until 1508; the double steeple facade was never completed. The northern steeple is 56 m high, the southern steeple is only 42 m high. The tip of the crossing steeple reaches a height of 68 m. The building suffered severe damage during the French Revolution and appears relatively plain today. The voluminous structure of the church and the existence of several medieval styles of construction are all the more apparent to the observer, though. The rose window in the facade (14th century) is one of the most ambitiously designed in Alsace.
- The church (monastery) of the Franciscans was built at the end of the 15th century.
- Numerous buildings from the late Middle Ages and the Renaissance (old city hall, old granary) still give the city a medieval character.
- The Witch Tower, built in the 13th to the 15th centuries, served as a prison.
- The castle of Isenbourg, residence of King Dagobert II and his son Sigbert, and later the Strasbourg bishop also, no longer remains. Today, a luxury hotel is housed in a reconstruction from the 19th century.
- The Établissement public local d’enseignement agricole de Rouffach is a secondary school for technology, agriculture and wine growing.

== Partner towns ==
Since 1964, Rouffach has been a partner of the German city of Bönnigheim in Baden-Württemberg.

== Notable people ==
Born in Rouffach:

- Konrad Pelikan, 1478–1556, reformer and theologian
- Valentin Boltz, 1515–1560, theologian and author
- Conrad Lycosthenes (1518–1561), Humanist and encyclopedist
- François Joseph Lefebvre (1755–1820), French Revolutionary general and Marshal of France

Resident in Rouffach:

- Sebastian Münster, Humanist, was a student of Konrad Pelikan in Rouffach from 1509 to 1511

== See also ==
- Communes of the Haut-Rhin department
