= Crosby Field =

American mechanical and electrical engineer

Crosby Field (March 12, 1889 – September 20, 1972) was an American mechanical and electrical engineer, manufacturer, vice president of the Brillo Manufacturing Company, and inventor. He is particularly known as inventor of the process to manufacture steel wool continuously, and as recipient of the 1953 ASME Medal.

== Biography ==
=== Youth, education, and early career ===
Field was born in Jamestown, New York, in 1889 as only child. His father was a clergyman, and his mother a member of "the southern branch of the Crosby family, which settled originally in Massachusetts in the Colonial period." He obtained his BSc from New York University in 1909, his M.E. in mechanical engineering from Cornell University in 1912, and his MSc in electrical engineering from Union College in 1914.

After his graduation in 1912 Field had started working at General Electric, among others at the Protective Apparatus Laboratory under Charles Proteus Steinmetz. After making a start with his own private practice as consulting engineer in 1914-15, he became chief engineer at Standard Aniline Products Corporation, now part of Allied Corp. After the outbreak of World War I, he served as in the United States Army Ordnance Department as inspector in ordnance, in which he rose to major.

=== Further career and acknowledgment ===
After World War I he returned to chemical industry as engineering manager of the National Aniline and Chemical Works, which would also merge into Allied Corp. In 1923 he to the Brillo Manufacturing Company, where he eventually served as vice president until 1942.

In World War II Fields again served in the US ARMY Ordnance Corps in the rank as colonel and assistant director of safety in the Office of the Chief of Ordnance.

Field was elected Fellow of the American Society of Mechanical Engineers, and was awarded the ASME Medal in 1953. He served as president of the American Society of Heating, Refrigerating and Air-Conditioning Engineers (ASHRAE), and on the council of the American Institute of Chemical Engineers. Over the years he had obtained more than 140 patents.

== Selected publications ==
- Crosby Field. Unit processes and principles of chemical engineering / by John C. Olsen,... ; in collaboration with Crosby Field, Alfred L. Webre, Theodore Baker... [et al.], 1932
- Crosby Field. The study of missiles resulting from accidental explosions; a manual for investigators. Washington, DC, United States Atomic Energy Commission, 1947.

Patents, a selection

- Patent US1646396 - Scrubbing device and material therefor
- Patent US1886661 - Plant apparatus and method for making metal
- Patent US1886662 - Wire shaving machine
- Patent US1976013 - Lubricating apparatus for metal cutting
