= Robot Award =

Robot Award is an annual awards event set up by Japan's Ministry of Economy, Trade and Industry (METI) in 2006. It aims to promote research and development for the commercialization of robots and the use of robotics. In 2008, eight winners were selected from 65 applications.

Robots that have provided outstanding services in the past year are eligible for the award. The program selects and recognizes robots that have made, or are highly likely to make, significant contribution to future market development.

In this program, a robot is defined as an intelligent mechanical system that incorporates three technological elements: sensing, intelligence and control, and drive. Robots (and their parts and software) that fall within the following categories are eligible.

- Service Robot - designed for service in offices, homes and public facilities.
- Industrial Robot - designed to take part in manufacturing processes on the shop floor.
- Public and Frontier Robot - designed to work for special purposes, such as survivor search and recovery operations at disaster sites and space and deep-sea exploration.
- Parts and Software - parts and software used in robot manufacture.

The selection process consisting of experts evaluating entries based on contribution to and potential for future market development. The selection criteria include: (a) social needs, (b) value from the user's point of view, and (c) technological innovativeness.

== See also ==
- List of mechanical engineering awards
