= Lloyd H. Donnell =

American mechanical engineer

Lloyd Hamilton Donnell (May 25, 1895 – November 7, 1997) was an American mechanical engineer, and Professor of Mechanical Engineering at the Illinois Institute of Technology. He is considered internationally renowned expert in engineering mechanics, specifically known for his work on shell analysis and thin-shell structure. He was recipient of the 1969 ASME Medal.

== Biography ==
=== Youth, education and early career ===
Donnell was born Kents Hill, Maine in 1895, son of Albert Webb Donnell and Annie Morrell Hamilton Donnell. His father was a teacher and his mother an author. After regular education he obtained his BSc in Mechanical Engineering from the University of Michigan in 1915. In 1930 he also obtained his PhD at the University of Michigan under Stephen Timoshenko.

After his graduation in 1915, Donnell had started teaching at University of Michigan. From 1930 to 1933 he was research assistant at the Aeronautical Laboratory of Caltech at Theodore von Kármán. From 1933 to 1939 he was engineer at Goodyear Zeppelin Company, where he worked on the design of airships.

=== Further career and acknowledgment ===
In 1939 Donnell joined the Illinois Institute of Technology faculty, where he served as Professor of Mechanical Engineering until his retirement in 1962. Afterwards he was Professor at Stanford University, and in 1974 guest professor at the University of Houston.

Donnell was founding editor of the engineering journal Applied Mechanics Reviews. He was awarded the honorary doctor degree by the Illinois Institute of Technology. In 1960 he received the Worcester Reed Warner Medal of the American Society of Mechanical Engineers (ASME), the Theodore von Karman Medal in 1968 and the ASME Medal in 1969.

== Work ==
Donnell is known for his "stress-analysis research into cylindrical shells, which advanced development of monocoque (wherein the external frame helps supports structural load) bodies for automobiles and planes. He also studied dynamics, elasticity, instability, and wave propagation."

== Selected publications ==
- Donnell, Lloyd Hamilton. Longitudinal wave transmission and impact. University of Michigan, 1930.
- Donnell, Lloyd Hamilton. Stability of thin-walled tubes under torsion. NACA Report No. 479, 1935.
- Donnell, Lloyd Hamilton. Beams, plates and shells. McGraw-Hill Companies, 1976.
- Donnell, Lloyd Hamilton. Symposium on the Theory of Shells (1966 : University of Houston). Proceedings, 1967
