= Ervin G. Bailey =

American mechanical engineer

Ervin George Bailey (December 25, 1880 – December 18, 1974) was an American mechanical engineer, founding president of Bailey Meter Company, manufacturer of industrial meters and controls, and inventor. He was recipient of the 1942 ASME Medal, and served as 67th president of the American Society of Mechanical Engineers.

Bailey was born in Damascus, Ohio as son of George W. Bailey and Ruthetta (Butler) Bailey He obtained his MSc in Mechanical Engineering from the Ohio State University in 1903. After his graduation he started his career at the Fairmont Coal Company in Fairmont, West Virginia as test engineer. In 1907 to 1909 he was head of the coal department of Arthur D. Little Inc. in Boston, and from 1909 to 1915 mechanical engineer and partner in the Fuel Testing Corporation in Boston. In 1916 he founded the Bailey Meter Company in Boston, which he moved to Cleveland, Ohio in 1919. The Bailey Meter Company grew out to a major manufacturer of industrial meters and controls.

Bailey obtained 141 patents for his inventions. Among the many engineering honors he received, the Franklin Institute awarded him the Longstreth Award in 1930, the ASME Medal, and the Percy Nicholls Award in 1942, and the American Association of Engineering Societies the John Fritz Medal in 1952. Bailey served as president of the American Society of Mechanical Engineers in the year 1948-49.

== Selected publications ==
- Patent US1107740 - Radii-averaging instrument, 1914.
- Patent US1190701 - Integrator, 1915.
- Patent US 1823927 A - Device for retaining furnace wall blocks against tubes, 1927-31
- Patent US1939650 - Furnace wall, 1933.
- Patent US3346672 - Method for heating solid inorganic material. 1966.
