= Nevin E. Funk =

American electrical engineer

Nevin Elwell Funk (November 4, 1883 – April, 1973) was an American electrical engineer, vice president engineering at the Philadelphia Electric Company, now PECO Energy Company. He is known as president of the American Institute of Electrical Engineers in 1943–44, and recipient of 1952 ASME Medal.

== Biography ==
=== Youth, education and early career ===
Funk was born in Bloomsburg, Pennsylvania, in 1883 to Nevin Ilrsinus Funk and Mary Louise (Elwell) Funk. He obtained his BSc in electrical engineering from Lehigh University in 1905.

After his graduation in 1905-06 Funk started his career as apprentice in the Westinghouse Electric Corporation in East Pittsburgh, Pennsylvania. In 1906 he was sub-foreman at the New York Central Railroad for a few months, and next from 1906 to 1907 assistant professor at Georgia School of Technology, now Georgia Institute of Technology.

=== Further career and acknowledgement ===
In 1907, Funk's career at the Philadelphia Electric Company took off. Only in between, in 1912–13, he was sales manager at Sterling Switchboard Co. He advanced at the Philadelphia Electric Company from assistant foremen to executive vice-president in charge of engineering since 1929, and retired in 1950.

In 1943 Lehigh University awarded Funk the honorary doctorate in engineering. From 1943 to 1945 he served as president of the Lehigh University Alumni Association board. In 1952 he was awarded the ASME Medal by the ASME for "pioneering achievements in economic operation of interconnected power systems," and in 1953 he received the Engineer of the Year award from Engineer's Week.
