= Martin Frisch =

Hungarian/American mechanical engineer and inventor

Martin Frisch (November 22, 1899 – June 16, 1959) was a Hungarian/American mechanical engineer, director of Foster Wheeler Corporation in New York City, and inventor. He is known for his contributions to the "development of modern practices in fuel pulverizing and steam generation.", and as recipient of the 1958 ASME Medal

== Biography ==
=== Early life and education ===
Frisch was born 1899 in Csebze, Hungary, now Cebza in Timiș County in Romania. He came with his family to the United States in 1909, where they settled in St. Louis, and naturalized in 1917. Frisch was named after his father, also engineer and inventor, who filed his first patent request from St. Louis in 1914.

After regular education Frisch was a student at Washington University from 1917 to 1919, and from the University of Illinois Urbana-Champaign from 1919 to 1921. In 1921 he obtained his BSc in Mechanical Engineering from the University of Illinois.

=== Further career and acknowledgement ===
After his graduation in 1921 Frisch started as manager of field engineering at the Combustion Engineering company. In 1929 Frisch joined the Foster Wheeler Corporation in New York City, an Industrial Research Laboratory, where he worked his way up. He started as engineer in charge of engineering in the furnace and pulverizer division of the corporation in 1929, and made it chief engineer in 1940. In 1948 he was vice-president in charge of engineering, and elected as a director of the corporation, a double position he still held in 1952.

Frisch was awarded over 50 patents in "fuel pulverization, steam generation, combustion, manufacturing methods and other areas of heat engineering." In 1958 the ASME awarded him their highest recommendation, the ASME Medal.

== Selected publications ==
- Frisch, Martin. "Pulverized-fuel-burning furnace." U.S. Patent No. 1,734,669. 5 Nov. 1929.
- Eric, Lundgren, and Frisch Martin. "Finely divided fuel burning furnace." U.S. Patent No. 1,866,404. 5 Jul. 1932.
- Frisch, Martin. "Pulverizing apparatus." U.S. Patent No. 1,898,086. 21 Feb. 1933.
- Frisch, Martin. "Burner." U.S. Patent No. 1,950,980. 13 Mar. 1934.
- Frisch, Martin. "Heater." U.S. Patent No. 2,305,611. 22 Dec. 1942.
- Frisch, Martin, "Method and apparatus for Method and apparatus for temperature regulation," Patent US2319223, 1943.
- Frisch, Martin, "Vapor generator," U.S. Patent No. 2,405,573. 13 Aug. 1946.
