= Lewis K. Sillcox =

American mechanical engineer

Lewis Ketcham Sillcox (April 30, 1886 – March 4, 1989) was an American mechanical engineer for railroads, business executive, 73rd president of the American Society of Mechanical Engineers, and recipient of the 1943 ASME Medal.

Born in Germantown, Philadelphia as son of George Washington Sillcox (1844–1924) and Georgiana (Parker) Sillcox (1866–1968), Sillcox received his education in Belgium. He obtained his engineering degree in 1903 from the L'Ecole Polytechnique in Brussels, nowadays part of the Université libre de Bruxelles.

Sillcox started his career in railroad companies in the United States and Canada. In 1927 he was appointed vice president at New York Air Brake. After his retirement from industry in 1959, he served another year as director of New York State Department of Transportation. In 1943 he was awarded the ASME Medal, and in 1954 he was elected president of the American Society of Mechanical Engineers for the year 1954–55.

== Selected publications ==
- Sillcox, Lewis Ketcham. Safety in Early American Railway Operation, 1853–1871. Printed at the Princeton University Press, 1936.
- Sillcox, Lewis Ketcham. The Rail-Highway Issue. Graduate School of Business Administration, Harvard University, 1936.
- Sillcox, Lewis Ketcham. Mastering momentum; a discussion of modern transport trends and their influence upon the equipment of American railways.. 1941.'
- Sillcox, Lewis Ketcham. Head-end horsepower... Syracuse university, 1949.
- Sillcox, Lewis Ketcham. Bulk Freight Battle. Graduate School of Business Administration, Harvard University, 1964.

== Archives and records ==
- Louis Ketchum Sillcox papers at Baker Library, Harvard Business School.
