= Robert Wellesley Mann =

American biomedical engineer

- Born: 1924; Brooklyn, New York, U.S.
- Died: 2006 (aged 81–82)
- Education: Massachusetts Institute of Technology (SB, 1950; SM, 1951; ScD, 1957)
- Known for: Biomechanics research
- Awards: Institute of Medicine (1971); American Academy of Arts and Sciences (1972); National Academy of Engineering (1973); ASME Medal (1977); National Academy of Sciences (1982)
- Scientific career
- Fields: Biomedical engineering, prosthetics
- Workplaces: Massachusetts Institute of Technology
- Notable students: Woodie C. Flowers

Robert Wellesley Mann (1924, Brooklyn, New York – 2006) was an American biomedical engineer and MIT professor known for his work in biomechanics and prosthetics.

== Biography ==
Mann graduated from Brooklyn Technical High School before serving in the Pacific theater in the Army during WWII. He came to MIT in 1947 on the GI Bill and received the S.B. degree in 1950, the S.M. in 1951 and the Sc.D. in 1957.

In the 1960s and 1970s, Mann and others developed software and machinery for converting English text into Braille. The goal was to allow blind readers faster access to published material.

In September 1968, a team of physicians and designers, led by Mann, introduced the "Boston Digital Arm", the first prosthetic limb controlled by a brain–computer interface, wherein the wearer could control the movement of the arm by the electric signals sent by the brain to electronic instruments designed to interpret the signals.

Mann also studied the forces in artificial hip joints while they were in motion.

Mann died on June 16, 2006.

== Awards ==
Mann was elected to the Institute of Medicine in 1971, the American Academy of Arts and Sciences in 1972, the National Academy of Engineering in 1973, and the National Academy of Sciences in 1982.

Mann received the ASME Medal in 1977.
