= Harvey C. Knowles =

Harvey Coles Knowles (March 11, 1891 – March 2, 1964) was an American engineer, business executive and inventor who was vice president of Procter & Gamble, Cincinnati. In 1950 he was awarded the ASME Medal.

Knowles was born in New York City to Andrew A. Knowles and Anna (Coles) Knowles. He graduated from Yale University with a Bachelor of Philosophy in 1912. He started his career in industry as manager of the New York works of the Westinghouse Lamp Company. In 1921 he joined the Procter and Gamble Company as general superintendent in charge of factories and mills. In 1930 he was appointed general manufacturing manager, and in 1942 he was promoted to vice president and director. During World War II he served as vice president of Procter & Gamble Defense Corporation, which was operating the Wolf Creek Ordnance Plant and Gulf Ordnance Plant. He retired from Procter & Gamble in 1961.

In 1950 Knowles was awarded the ASME Medal by the ASME. He died in 1964 in Montego Bay in Jamaica during vacation.

== Selected publications ==
- Harvey C. Knowles. "System for conveying and inspecting soap," US Patent 1,636,235, 1927.
