= ASME Medal =

- Awarded for: highest award bestowed to recognize “eminently distinguished engineering achievement.”
- Country: United States
- Presented by: ASME
- Rewards: Certificate, honorarium and Medal
- First award: 1920

The ASME Medal, created in 1920, is the highest award bestowed by the ASME (founded as the American Society of Mechanical Engineers) Board of Governors for "eminently distinguished engineering achievement". The award has been presented every year since 1996 (first medalist was awarded in 1921), and it consists of a $15,000 honorarium, a certificate, a travel supplement not to exceed $750, and a gold medal inscribed with the words, "What is not yet, may be".

ASME also gives out a number of other awards yearly, including the Edwin F. Church Medal, the Holley medal, and the Soichiro Honda medal.

== List of recipients ==
Source: ASME

- 1921: Hjalmar G. Carlson
- 1922: Frederick A. Halsey
- 1923: John R. Freeman
- 1926: Robert Andrews Millikan
- 1927: Wilfred Lewis
- 1928: Julian Kennedy
- 1930: W. L. R. Emmet
- 1931: Albert Kingsbury
- 1933: Ambrose Swasey
- 1934: Willis Carrier
- 1935: Charles T. Main
- 1936: Edward Bausch
- 1937: Edward P. Bullard, Jr.
- 1938: Stephen J. Pigott
- 1939: James E. Gleason
- 1940: Charles F. Kettering
- 1941: Theodore von Karman
- 1942: Ervin G. Bailey
- 1943: Lewis K. Sillcox
- 1944: Edward G. Budd
- 1945: William F. Durand
- 1946: Morris E. Leeds
- 1947: Paul W. Kiefer
- 1948: Frederick G. Keyes
- 1949: Fred L. Dornbrook
- 1950: Harvey C. Knowles
- 1951: Glenn B. Warren
- 1952: Nevin E. Funk
- 1953: Crosby Field
- 1954: E. Burnley Powell
- 1955: Granville M. Read
- 1956: Harry F. Vickers
- 1957: Llewellen M.K. Boelter
- 1958: Wilbur H. Armacost
- 1959: Martin Frisch
- 1960: C. Richard Soderberg
- 1962: Philip Sporn
- 1963: Igor I. Sikorsky
- 1964: Alan Howard
- 1965: Jan Burgers
- 1967: Mayo D. Hersey
- 1968: Samuel C. Collins
- 1969: Lloyd H. Donnell
- 1970: Robert Rowe Gilruth
- 1971: Horace Smart Beattie
- 1972: Waloddi Weibull
- 1973: Christopher C. Kraft, Jr.
- 1974: Nicholas J. Hoff
- 1975: Maxime A. Faget
- 1976: Raymond D. Mindlin
- 1977: Robert W. Mann
- 1979: Jacob P. Den Hartog
- 1980: Soichiro Honda
- 1981: Robert S. Hahn
- 1983: Jack N. Binns, Sr.
- 1984: Aaron Cohen
- 1985: Milton C. Shaw
- 1986: Orlan W. Boston
- 1987: Philip G. Hodge
- 1988: Eric Reissner
- 1989: William R. Sears
- 1990: Harley A. Wilhelm
- 1992: Daniel C. Drucker
- 1993: Richard H. Gallagher
- 1996: Robert C. Dean, Jr.
- 1997: Bernard Budiansky
- 1998: Frank Kreith
- 1999: H. Norman Abramson
- 2000: Arthur E. Bergles
- 2001: Warren M. Rohsenow
- 2002: Leroy S. "Skip" Fletcher
- 2003: Norman R. Augustine
- 2004: Bradford W. Parkinson
- 2005: Robert E. Uhrig
- 2006: Richard J. Goldstein
- 2007: Dean L. Kamen
- 2008: Frank E. Talke
- 2009: Nam Pyo Suh
- 2010: John Abele
- 2011: C. Daniel Mote, Jr.
- 2012: Jan D. Achenbach
- 2013: Siavouche Nemat-Nasser
- 2014: Van C. Mow
- 2015: James R. Rice
- 2016: J. N. Reddy
- 2017: Zdeněk P. Bažant
- 2018: Thomas J.R. Hughes
- 2019: Reginald I. Vachon
- 2020: Subra Suresh
- 2021: Pol D. Spanos
- 2022: Katepalli R. Sreenivasan
- 2023: Huajian Gao
- 2024: Adrian Bejan
- 2025: Timothy C. Lieuwen
- 2026: Yonggang Huang

== See also ==
- List of engineering awards
- ASME Leonardo Da Vinci Award
