= Granville M. Read =

American mechanical engineer (1894–1962)

Granville Moorman Read (March 18, 1894 – December 1, 1962) was an American mechanical engineer and Chief Engineer at E. I. du Pont de Nemours & Co., Inc. from 1946 to 1959. In 1955 the ASME awarded Read the ASME Medal ""for his outstanding leadership in developing men and in organizing and completing projects of extraordinary national and industrial importance."

== Biography ==
=== Youth, education and early career ===
Read was born in Bedford County, Virginia in 1894, son of Daniel Warwick Read and Laura Moorman Read. His father was a lawyer and teacher, and both parents had been teachers at the New London Academy from 1885 to 1896.

Read attended Virginia Polytechnic Institute, now Virginia Tech, the Drexel Institute, and the École des Beaux-Arts in Paris, France. After his graduation in 1915 he started his lifelong career at E.l. du Pont de Nemours & Co.

=== Further career and acknowledgement ===
In 1915 Read started at Du Pont as a "material checker at the smokeless-powder plant in Hopewell, Va., which the company operated for the federal government during the First World War." From 1930 to 1940 he served as Assistant Director of the Industrial Engineering Division.

In World War II he participated in the Manhattan Project. As deputy of E.G. Ackart, Du Pont's chief engineer and Engineering Department head, Read was primary responsibility for the construction aspects of the plutonium program at Du Pont. From 1946 to 1959 Raed was Chief Engineer at Du Pont as successor of E.G. Ackart.

In 1955 Read was awarded the ASME Medal by the ASME, and in 1957 the National Society of Professional Engineers granted him the NSPE Award for Outstanding Service to the engineering profession. On May 29, 1960 the North Carolina State University awarded Read an Honorary degree.

=== Home and family ===
Read lived at the stately home, called Read-Moor, in Bedford County, Virginia near the New London Academy on Route 811. Read bought it in 1936 from his uncle Barlow Read, the original owner. Read remodelled and modernized the old house and named it Read-Moor.

Read died at his home in Westover Hills, Wilmington, Delaware on December 1, 1962.
