= Horace Smart Beattie =

American engineer

- Born: 19 July 1909; United States
- Died: 1993 (aged 83–84); Lexington, Kentucky
- Education: Massachusetts Institute of Technology
- Occupation: IBM Engineer
- Scientific career
- Fields: Computer Science, Electrical Engineering
- Workplaces: IBM

Horace Smart Beattie (19 July 1909 – 6 September 1993) was an American computer scientist and electric engineer. He is most well known for being the inventor of the IBM Selectric typewriter.

== Education ==
He received his B.A. from Williams College, and had a B.S. from the Massachusetts Institute of Technology.

== Career ==
He joined IBM in June 1933 as a customer serviceman.

He rose up ranks at IBM to become the corporate vice-president in 1972.

=== Patents ===
He filed several patents related to the design and functioning of IBM Selectric Typewriters.

== Awards and honours ==
He received the ASME Medal in 1971.
