= Willibald Trinks =

German-American mechanical engineer (1874–1966)

Charles Leopold Willibald Trinks
- Born: 10 December 1874; Berlin, Germany
- Died: 24 May 1966 (aged 91); Tucson, Arizona, US
- Education: Technische Hochschule Berlin
- Known for: Industrial furnaces Steel mill roll pass design
- Awards: Percy Nicholls Award (1958)
- Scientific career
- Fields: Mechanical Engineering Professor
- Workplaces: Carnegie Tech

Charles Leopold Willibald Trinks (10 December 1874 in Berlin – 24 May 1966 in Tucson, Arizona, United States) was a German scientist who emigrated to Pennsylvania soon after getting his degree from the Technische Hochschule in Charlottnburg (now Technische Universität Berlin). Working as an engineer in different US companies he became the world authority in industrial furnaces. At the Carnegie Institute of Technology he organized the Department of Mechanical Engineering.

== Life ==
Willibald Trinks was born 1874 in Berlin, Kingdom of Prussia. He got his tertiary education at Königlich Technische Hochschule Berlin-Charlottenburg (now Technische Universität Berlin). Then after working in Germany for two years he emigrated to Pennsylvania in the United States. He had three marriages: Maud Alice Moore, whom he married in 1902 in Allegheny County. After her death he married her sister Edith Moore. In 1938 he married Ruth Eudora Waxham in Pittsburgh. His two sons died early: Charles Henry Gisbert Trinks (1903 - 1914), and Harold A. Trinks (1911 - 1929). Willibald Trinks died in 1966.

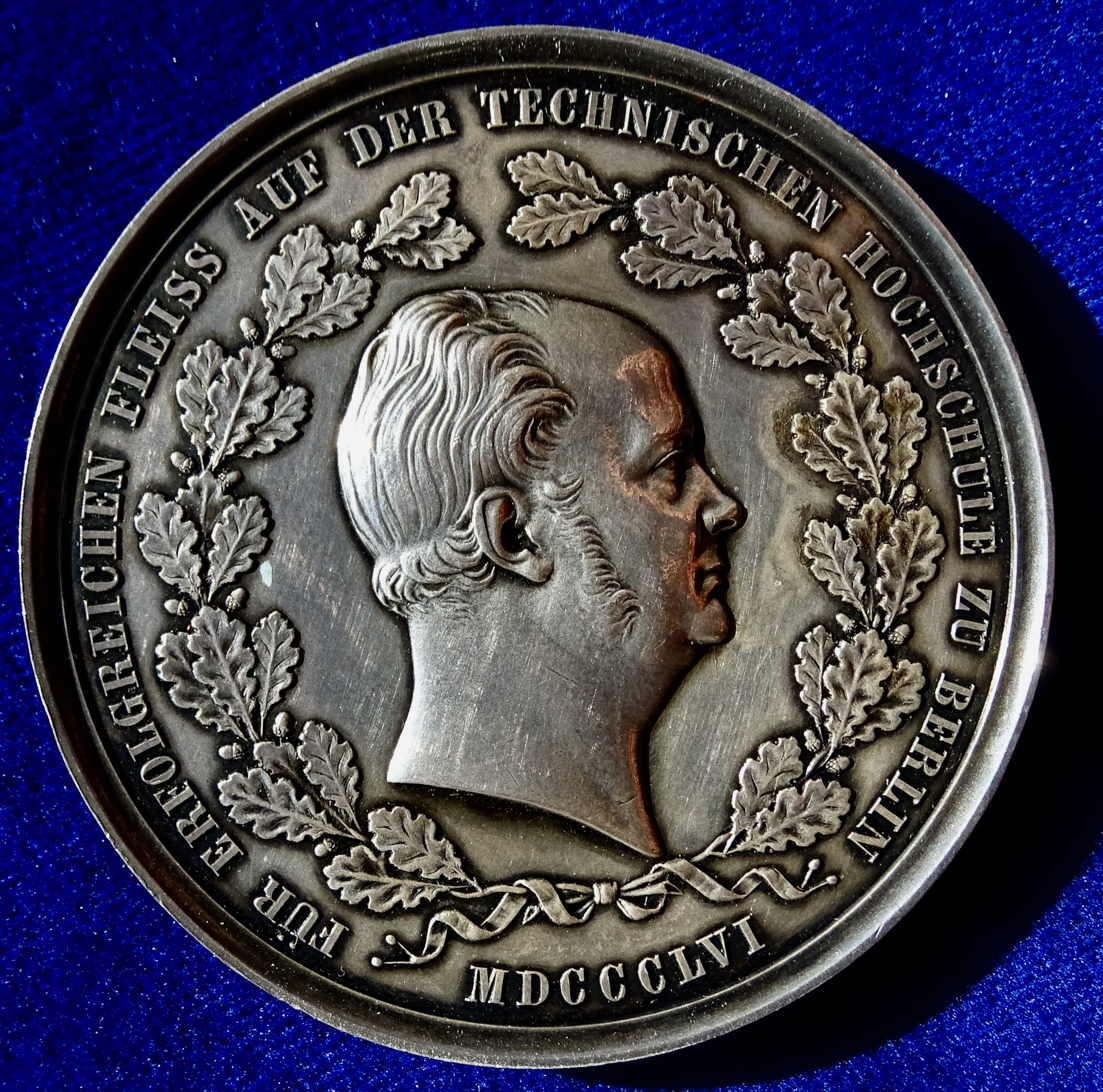
The obverse of the award medal introduced in 1856 by King Friedrich Wilhelm IV of Prussia, that was won by Trinks

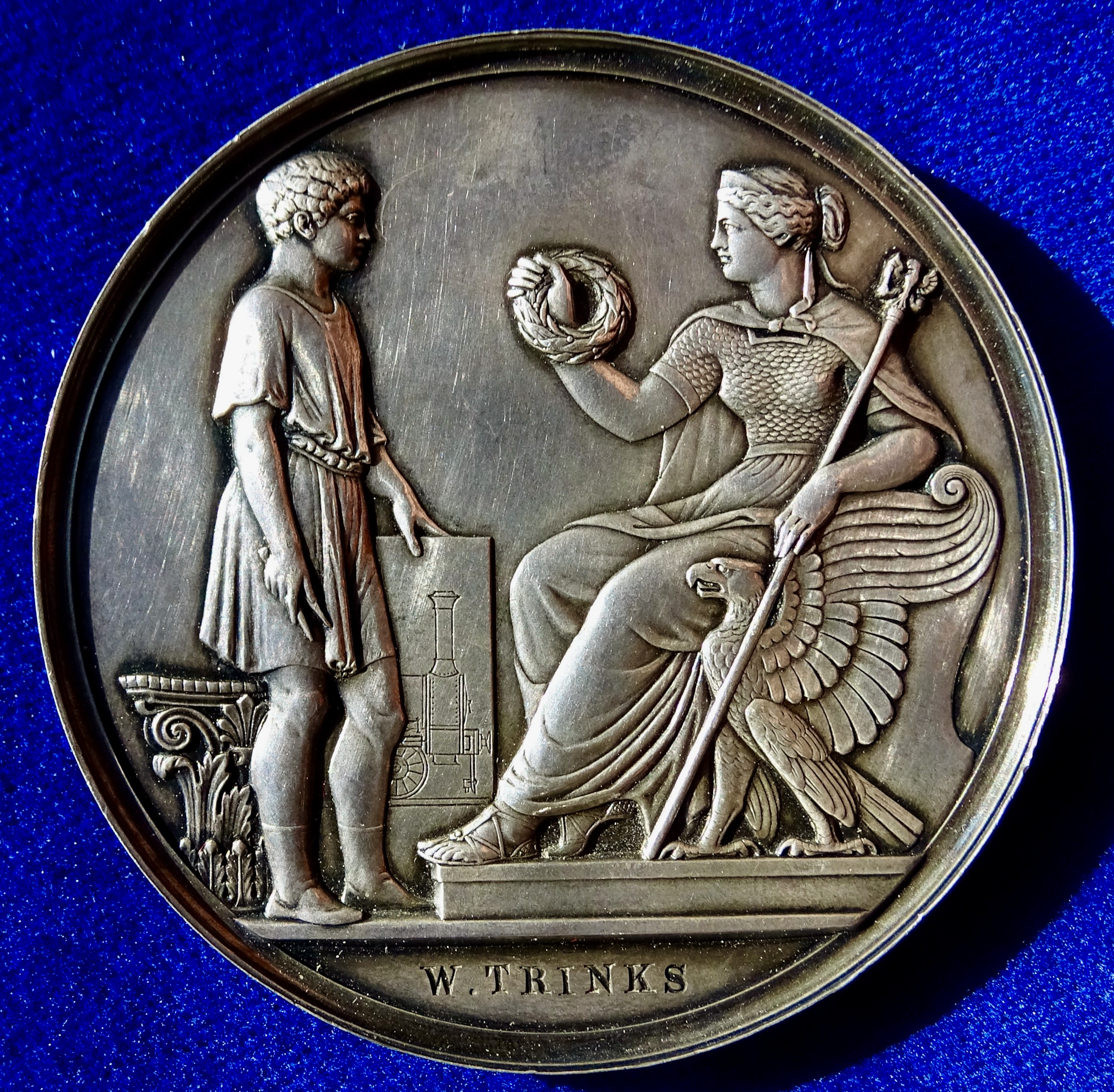
The reverse of that medal carrying the name W. Trinks as a prize for his outstanding graduation in engineering

== Career ==
W. Trinks graduated with distinction from the Technische Hochschule Charlottenburg in 1897. Before his emigration to the US he worked as a mechanical engineer in Germany for two years.

In the United States he was engineer at William Cramp & Sons Ship & Engine Building Company Philadelphia, Southwark Foundry and Machine Company in Philadelphia, then Chief Engineer at Westinghouse Electric & Manufacturing Company Pittsburgh, Pennsylvania.

Professor Trinks was one of the first appointments of the Carnegie Institute of Technology in Pittsburgh, where he headed the Department of Mechanical Engineering for 38 years.

== Scientific publications ==
- Shaft Governors (1918), D. van Nostrand Company, New York
- Governors and the Governing of Prime Movers (1919), D. van Nostrand Company, New York
- Industrial Furnaces: Volume 1 (1923), John Wiley & Sons, New York
- Industrial Furnaces: Volume 2 (1925), John Wiley & Sons, New York
- Roll Pass Design Volume 1 (1933), Penton Publishing Company, Cleveland, Ohio
- Roll Pass Design Volume 2 (1934), Penton Publishing Company, Cleveland, Ohio

== Awards ==
- Percy Nicholls Award (1958)
