= British Engineering Excellence Awards =

The British Engineering Excellence Awards (BEEAs) were established in 2009 as a means to demonstrate the high calibre of engineering design and innovation within the UK. Small and large British companies are encouraged to submit their entries into the appropriate categories for consideration. Here they compete on a level playing field where the quality of engineering design is the primary factor.

Organised by Dartford based Eureka and New Electronics, the BEEAs have received support from individuals with a vested interest in the future of UK engineering, such as Richard Nobel (Director of The BLOODHOUND Project) and Kate Bellingham.

The most prestigious award offered by the BEEAs is the British Engineering Excellence Grand Prix, chosen by judges from winning entries in the programme. In 2009 the award was received by Flybrid Systems, and then in 2010 by Andrew Burrows of i20 Water.

The Judges’ Special Award, an award issued at the judges’ discretion to an entrant of any of the award categories, was received in 2009 by Lotus Engineering and then by Dexela in 2010.

== Categories ==
The award categories for the BEEAs are as follows:

- Design Engineer of the Year
- Young Design Engineer of the Year
- Consultancy of the Year
- Small Company of the Year
- Start Up of the Year
- Green Product of the Year
- New Product of the Year (Electronic)
- New Product of the Year (Mechanical)
- Mechatronic Design of the Year
- British Engineering Excellence Grand Prix
- Judges’ Special Award

== Venue ==
The venue for the British Engineering Excellence Awards has been the UnderGlobe in London’s Shakespeare’s Globe Theatre and, as of the 2015, The Hurlingham Club.

== See also ==
- List of mechanical engineering awards
