= Thomas Goode Jones School of Law =

Law school in Montgomery, Alabama, US

- Motto: Learn Law. Seek Justice.
- Parent school: Faulkner University (since 1983)
- Established: 1928; 98 years ago
- School type: Private
- Parent endowment: $18.5 million (2008)
- Dean: Charles Campbell
- Location: Montgomery, Alabama, U.S. 32.383°N 86.218°W
- Enrollment: 304
- Faculty: 17 full time, 13 part time
- USNWR ranking: 164 (tied) (2026)
- Bar pass rate: 71.43% (2024 first-time takers)
- Website: www.faulkner.edu/law
- ABA profile: Jones Profile

The Thomas Goode Jones School of Law (FaulknerLaw, Jones Law, JLS, or JSL) is the law school of Faulkner University, located in Montgomery, Alabama.

== History ==
Jones School of Law was founded in 1928 by Montgomery County Circuit Judge Walter B. Jones. The law school is named after Jones' father, Thomas Goode Jones, a Confederate veteran who was governor of Alabama and U.S. District Judge for the Northern and Middle Districts of Alabama.

In 1972, the University of Alabama Board of Trustees purchased Jones, changed the name to Jones Law Institute, and set up a not-for-profit corporation to operate the school. Jones Law Institute then moved to Huntingdon College in 1973 before Faulkner University acquired the school in 1983, renaming it Jones School of Law.

In 1996, the school was moved into Marjorie Y. Snook Building as the permanent law school building.

In 1998, the Faulkner University Board of Trustees moved forward with seeking accreditation by the American Bar Association. In 2006, the American Bar Association granted Jones provisional status as an accredited law school. In 2009, Jones School of Law received full accreditation from the American Bar Association.

== Admissions ==
For the class entering in 2023, the school accepted 247 (58.25%) of applicants, with 118 of those accepted enrolling, a 47.77% yield rate. One student was not included in the acceptance statistics. The class consists of 119 students. The median LSAT score was 150 and the median undergraduate GPA was 3.21. Its 25th/75th percentile LSAT scores and GPA were 148/152 and 2.77/3.57. Six students were not included in the LSAT calculation and two not included in the GPA calculation.

== Rankings ==
In 2025, U.S. News & World Report ranked Thomas Goode Jones No.178-195 out of 197 ABA accredited law schools.

== Bar examination passage ==
In 2024, the overall bar examination passage rate for the law school's first-time examination takers was 71.43%. The Ultimate Bar Pass Rate, which the ABA defines as the passage rate for graduates who sat for bar examinations within two years of graduating, was 88.10% for the class of 2022.

== Employment ==
According to the schools's official ABA-required disclosures for 2024 graduates, within ten months after graduation 95% of the 74 member graduating class was employed in full-time positions requiring bar passage (i.e. as attorneys) and 9% were employed in full-time JD advantage positions. Positions were in various size law firms, most being in 1-10 attorney firms with none in firms of 250 or more attorneys, three graduates obtained local or state judicial clerkships and one a federal clerkship. 13 were employed in public interest, government, higher education, or business employment. 26% of the class was unemployed.

== Costs ==
Tuition at Thomas Goode Jones School of Law for the 2023–2024 academic year was $39,900.00, while projected living expenses for 2020-2021 was $28,400.00.

== Programs ==
Thomas Goode Jones School of Law offers a joint JD / LL.M in dispute resolution, as well as a JD program.

== Notable alumni ==
- Reginald I. Vachon (1937 – 2020) (JD 1969), mechanical engineer, business executive, lawyer, inventor, and former president of the American Society of Mechanical Engineers
- Charles Williamson ‘Will’ Barfoot (JD 2001), member of the Alabama State Senate
- Perry Hooper Jr. (JD 1979), former member of the Alabama House of Representatives (1984 – 2003)
- Charles Larimore Jones (1932 – 2006) (JD 1981), attorney, educator, former an architect of the U.S. Air Force's forward air control doctrine
- Bobby Bright (JD 1982), former member of the United States House of Representatives representing Alabama's 2nd congressional district and the 55th Mayor of Montgomery
- Tommy Bryan (JD 1983), associate justice of the Supreme Court of Alabama
- Durell Peaden (JD 1987) former member of the Florida Senate
- Tom Whatley (JD 1998), former member of the Alabama State Senate
- Alisa Kelli Wise (JD 1995), associate justice of the Supreme Court of Alabama
- Greg Albritton (J.D. 1995), Member of the Alabama State Senate
- Patrice ‘Penni’ McClammy (JD 2002), attorney and member of the Alabama House of Representatives
- Jim Zeigler (J.D. 1978), former Alabama State Auditor and former member of the Alabama Public Service Commission
- Isaac Whorton (J.D. 2006), former member of the Alabama House of Representatives; Circuit Court Judge for the 5th Judicial Circuit

== Notable faculty ==
- John Eidsmoe, former professor of law emeritus.
- Allison Garrett, assistant professor of law (2004 to 2007); as of 2024, chancellor of the Oklahoma State System of Higher Education
