= Holley Medal =

The Holley Medal is an award of ASME (the American Society of Mechanical Engineers) for "outstanding and unique act(s) of an engineering nature, accomplishing a noteworthy and timely public benefit by one or more individuals for a single achievement, provided the contributions are equal or comparable."

The award was established in 1924 in honor of the American mechanical engineer, inventor and charter member of ASME Alexander Lyman Holley (1832-1888).

== List of recipients ==
- 1924, Hjalmar G. Carlson
- 1928, Elmer Ambrose Sperry
- 1930, Baron Chuza-buro Shiba
- 1934, Irving Langmuir
- 1936, Henry Ford
- 1937, Frederick Gardner Cottrell
- 1938, Francis Hodgkinson
- 1939, Carl Edvard Johansson
- 1940, Edwin Howard Armstrong
- 1941, John Garand
- 1942, Ernest Lawrence
- 1943, Vannevar Bush
- 1944, Carl Norden
- 1945, Sanford Alexander Moss
- 1946, Norman Gibson
- 1947, Raymond D. Johnson
- 1948, Edwin H. Land
- 1950, Charles Gordon Curtis
- 1951, George R. Fink
- 1952, Sanford Lockwood Cluett
- 1953, Philip M. McKenna
- 1954, Walter A. Shewhart
- 1955, George J. Hood
- 1957, Charles Stark Draper
- 1959, Col. Maurice J. Fletcher
- 1961, Thomas Elmer Moon
- 1963, William Shockley
- 1968, Chester Carlson
- 1973, Harold Eugene Edgerton, Kenneth J. Germeshausen
- 1975, George M. Grover
- 1976, Emmett Leith, Juris Upatnieks
- 1977, J. David Margerum
- 1979, Bruce G. Collipp, Douwe de Vries
- 1980, Soichiro Honda
- 1982, Jack Kilby
- 1985, John Vincent Atanasoff
- 1986, Wilson Greatbatch
- 1987, Robert J. Moffat
- 1988, Vernon D. Roosa
- 1989, Jack S. Kilby, Jerry D. Merryman, James H. Van Tassel
- 1990, Roy J. Plunkett
- 1991, James R. Thompson
- 1994, Dominick Danna, Richard W. Newman, William C. Moore
- 1996, Bernard J. Miller
- 1998, Donna Shirley
- 2001, Heinz Erzberger
- 2005, James D. Walker
- 2008, David G. Lilley
- 2010, Ashwani K. Gupta
- 2020, Yogesh Jaluria
- 2023, Robert Hauck
- 2024, Kenneth A. Warren

== See also ==
- List of mechanical engineering awards
