= Arbogast =

Arbogast may refer to:

== People ==
=== As a given name ===
- Arbogast (magister militum), a 4th-century Frankish general
- Arbogast (Count of Trier), a 5th-century Frankish-Roman comes in Trier who may have been Bishop of Chartres
- Saint Arbogast (c. 600s–700), an Irish missionary and Bishop of Strasbourg

=== As a surname ===
- Bob Arbogast (1927–2009), American radio broadcaster, voice actor and television host
- Carl Arbogast, compiler of the eponymous Arbogast Method used in selection cutting silviculture
- Louis François Antoine Arbogast (1759 – 1803), a French mathematician who published a well-known calculus treatise in 1800
- Luc Arbogast (1975 –), a French musician, singer and songwriter
- Roy Arbogast (born 1941), American special effects artist
- Thierry Arbogast, a French cinematographer known for his collaboration with director Luc Besson
- Todd Arbogast, an American mathematician known for his work in subsurface modeling

== Characters and fictional entities ==
- Carl Arbogast, River Phoenix's character in the film Sneakers
- Chief Dino Arbogast, a senior officer of the New York Police Department in the TV series Blue Bloods
- Dr. Larry Arbogast, Danny DeVito's character in the film Junior
- Detective Milton Arbogast, the investigator in Alfred Hitchcock's film Psycho
- UNS Arboghast, a scientific research spaceship in the TV series The Expanse
