= E. Burnley Powell =

American engineer

Edwin Burnley Powell (September 23, 1880 – 1963) was an American mechanical and consulting engineer. He was awarded the 1954 ASME Medal for many years of consulting engineering. The ASME had argued, that in these days he was "probably the most widely consulted engineer in the public-utility field."

== Biography ==
=== Youth, education and early career ===
Powell was born in Brookhaven, Mississippi in 1880 to Edward F. Powell and Hardinia Burnley Powell Howie, an artist, instructor in applied arts, and student of William Merritt Chase. He attended Millsaps College in Jackson, Mississippi, where he obtained his BSc in 1904.

In 1900 Powell had started his career in 1900 at the New York Edison Company, now Consolidated Edison, at the meter and testing department. After his graduation in 1904 until 1907 he was as chemist in charge of the Chemical Laboratory & Mechanical Testing Department.

=== Further career and acknowledgement ===
In 1907 Powell moved to the Stone & Webster engineering services company in Stoughton, Massachusetts, where he started as engineer on the engineering department. From 1914 to 1920 he was betterment engineer, supervising charge betterment work on several power stations. In 1920 he was appointed consulting engineer for the organization, specializing in power stations.

In 1952 Powell was elected Fellow of ASME, and in the same year he celebrated fifty years of continuous membership. In 1954 the ASME awarded his that year the ASME Medal for "distinguished service in engineering and science."

=== Family ===
Powell married Jessie Elizabeth (Walker) Powell. Their son, Edwin Burnley Powell, Jr. (27 Sept. 1909 – June 1985) followed into his footsteps. He graduated from MIT in 1932 and published a series articles about a method of measuring and displaying generator rotor angles in the late 1950s.

== Selected publications ==
- Powell, Edwin Burnley Boiler-furnace refractories, New York, American society of mechanical engineers, 1925.

Articles, a selection

- E. B. Powell. "Requirements in the Design of Steam Power Stations for Hydraulic Relay," Mech. Eng., vol.43, no. 10, Oct. 1921, pp. 650, 652 and 674
- Powell, E. B. "Design of the Steam-Power Station for Hydraulic Relay." Power. Vol. 53, 12, pp. 482–5
