= Museum of Life (film) =

- Genre: Documentary
- Directed by: Sophie Elwin-Harris; Ian A. Hunt; Richard Farish
- Presented by: Jimmy Doherty; Kate Bellingham; Liz Bonnin; Mark Carwardine; Chris van Tulleken
- Composers: David Ayers; Felix Tod
- Country of origin: United Kingdom
- Original language: English
- No. of episodes: 6

Production
- Executive producer: Ludo Graham
- Producers: Sophie Elwin-Harris; Ian A. Hunt; Richard Farish
- Production company: BBC Cymru Wales

Original release
- Network: BBC Two
- Release: 18 March – 22 April 2010

Museum of Life is a 2010 BBC Two documentary, that takes a look behind the scenes at the Natural History Museum, London. It is introduced and co-presented by Jimmy Doherty, who was a volunteer at the Natural History Museum ten years previously. Other presenters are Kate Bellingham, Liz Bonnin, Mark Carwardine, and Chris van Tulleken.

The six-part programme ranges over topics such as the care and maintenance of the museum's 70 million specimens, and the relevance of research by the museum scientists to contemporary problems such as biodiversity loss and the spread of tropical disease.

== Episodes ==
Episode No.	Title of Episode	Original Air Date
1.	"A Museum in a Modern World"	18 March 2010
2.	"Digging Up the Past"	25 March 2010
3.	"All Creatures Great and Small"	1 April 2010
4.	"Discovery"	8 April 2010
5.	"The Power of Insects"	15 April 2010
6.	"A Collection for the Future"	22 April 2010
