= Reginald I. Vachon =

American mechanical engineer, lawyer and inventor

President of the American Society of Mechanical Engineers
- In office 2003–2004

Personal details
- Born: Reginald Irenee Vachon; January 29, 1937 Norfolk, Virginia, U.S.
- Died: December 24, 2020 (aged 83)
- Parent(s): Rene Albert Vachon; Regina (Galvin) Radcliffe Vachon
- Education: United States Naval Academy; Auburn University (BSc, MSc); Oklahoma State University (PhD); Thomas Goode Jones School of Law (LLB)
- Profession: Mechanical engineer, business executive, lawyer, inventor
- Awards: ASME Medal (2019)

Reginald Irenee Vachon (January 29, 1937 – December 24, 2020) was an American mechanical engineer, business executive, lawyer and inventor, known as former president of the American Society of Mechanical Engineers.

== Biography ==
=== Youth, education and early career ===
Vachon was born in Norfolk, Virginia, son of Rene Albert Vachon and Regina (Galvin) Radcliffe Vachon. After his high school graduation in 1954, he attended the United States Naval Academy in 1954–55. He continued his studies at Auburn University, where he obtained his BSc in mechanical engineering in 1958, and his MSc in nuclear science in 1960.

Vachon further continued his studies at Oklahoma State University, where he obtain his Ph.D. in mechanical engineering in 1963. In 1969 he would also obtained his Bachelor of Laws at the Thomas Goode Jones School of Law. In the meantime Vachon had started his academic career at Auburn University in 1958 as a research assistant, became a research associate in 1963, and was associate professor from 1963 to 1978.

=== Further career ===
In 1977, Vachon founded Vachon Nix & Associates, where he is president ever since. From 1981 to 1990 he worked as chief operating officer at the Thacker Construction Company. In 1991-92 he was president and CEO of Compris Technology, Inc., and has served as an executive in some other companies ever since, including United Information Technologies, Inc. and Direct Measurements, Inc.

=== Honours and awards ===
He was President of the American Society of Mechanical Engineers International in 2003–2004.

He was awarded the 2019 ASME Medal by the American Society of Mechanical Engineers.

== Selected publications ==
Articles, a selection

- Fong, J. T., Ranson, W. F., Vachon, R. I., & Marcal, P. V. (2008, January). Structural Aging Monitoring via Web-Based Nondestructive Evaluation (NDE) Technology. In ASME 2008 Pressure Vessels and Piping Conference (pp. 1565-1613). American Society of Mechanical Engineers.

Patents, a selection

- Vachon, Reginald I. "Apparatus and method for determining stress and strain in pipes, pressure vessels, structural members and other deformable bodies." U.S. Patent No. 4,591,996. 27 May 1986.
- Vachon, Reginald I., and William F. Ranson. "Apparatus and method for determining the stress and strain in pipes, pressure vessels, structural members and other deformable bodies." U.S. Patent No. 5,065,331. 12 Nov. 1991.
- Vachon, Reginald I. "Finite element analysis fatigue gage." U.S. Patent No. 6,874,370. 5 Apr. 2005.
