= Hjalmar G. Carlson =

American metal worker and inventor

Hjalmar Gotfried Carlson (1879 - c. 1930s) was an American sheet metal worker, expert in metal drawing, superintendent, and inventor, who worked in Worcester, Massachusetts. He is known for being awarded the first ASME Medal in 1921, and the first Holley Medal in 1924.

== Life and work ==
Carlson was born in 1879 in Östergötland in Sweden at an industrial estate, who arrived in the United States in 1900. Carlson settled in Worcester, Massachusetts.

Carlson worked most of his career at the Rockwood Sprinkler Company of Massachusetts. He had started working as sheet metal worker, and made his way up to general superintendent and mechanical engineer. In most of his patented inventions Carlson acted as assignor to the Rockwood Sprinkler Co. In 1930 when Rockwood Sprinkler Co. was absorbed by the Gamewell Co., manufacturer of fire alarm systems, Carlson had resigned as superintendent.

In 1921 Carlson was awarded the first ASME Medal for "his invention and part in the production of 20,000,000 Mark III drawn steel booster casings used principally as a component of 75-mm high explosive shells and bombs." In 1924 the ASME also awarded him the Holley Medal for "inventions and processes in the field of Ordnance which materially aided victory in the World War."

== Work ==
=== 1921 ASME Medal ===
In 1921 Carlson was awarded the first ASME Medal for his part in the production of state of the art ammunition for the United States Army Ordnance Corps during World War I. An ASME committee made the following outline of Mr. Carlson's achievements relative to the production of these casings:

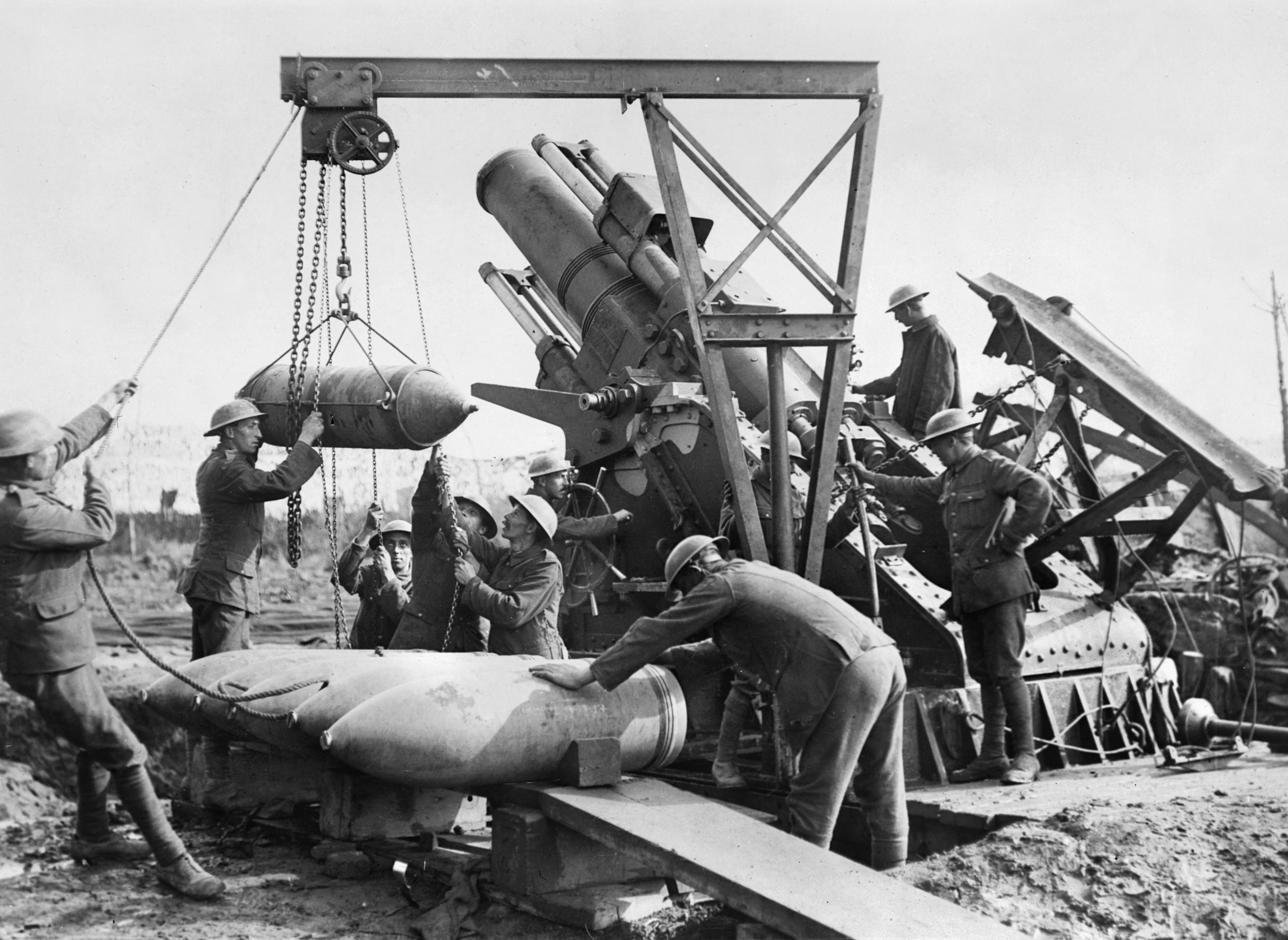
15 inch high-explosive howitzer shells, circa 1917

"A booster consisting of a booster casing, charge of high explosive, and a fuse socket, is one of the components essential to the proper functioning of a high-explosive shell at the target. The production of boosters is dependent upon the booster casing, a component entirely new to the manufacturers of this country and even to the Ordnance Department before the war."
"For many years before the war and throughout its duration the French used in their 75-mm. gun a shell having a tapered booster casing made by hot-drawing a short round billet, until the approximate shape was obtained, and then either finish-forming in process, or machining it to the exact shape."

And more specific about Carlson invented a process of cold-drawing, and his role in selling it to the US Ordnance Department:

Basic drawing process for a wire, bar or tube.

"About a year before the war Mr. Carlson invented a process of cold-drawing, without subsequent machining, the French type of booster casing from “dead soft, deep drawing” sheet steel. Soon after the United States entered the war, in a talk with the officer in charge of the design and production of artillery ammunition, he found that the French type of shell and components had been decided upon, but that the design of the booster casing had been modified by doing away with the taper on its outside because of its being too difficult to permit of manufacture in large quantities, and substituting for it a straight cylindrical surface. Furthermore, Mr. Carlson found that the Department, having been advised by competent manufacturers that even the straight-sided booster casing could not be drawn from the flat sheet, owing to its enlarged threaded end, had fully decided to machine all casings from the solid bar in automatic screw machines. The Department was prepared to pay 14 cents each for these casings so made."
"Mr. Carlson convinced the officials of the Ordnance Department that their substitute design for the French type could and should be cold-drawn from flat stock rather than machined from bars in automatic screw machines, and also that the exact French tapered model could also be thus reproduced."

The method developed by Carlson was further perfected for practical manufacture, as the ASME committee further explained:

"The Rockwood Sprinkler Company, Worcester, Mass., of which Mr. Carlson was general superintendent, contracted to make these casings for the Ordnance Department. Mr. Carlson made a series of inventions to perfect his method of manufacture and make it entirely practical and organized a new manufacturing department which made over twenty million casings. Due to the large saving in material and in plant cost and expense of operation, the Rockwood Company was able to produce the casings at a much lower price than that first estimated, delivered them several weeks ahead of the contract time of delivery, and did much in helping other government contractors to fill their contracts."

The 20,000,000 steel booster casings had been used as component of 75-mm high-explosive shells in World War I, but also in bombs, gas shells and other munitions.

=== Reception ===
His grand-grandson Evan Carlson (2017) summarized about Carlson's inventions that "most things he invented would go unnoticed like so many great innovations do but these inventions changed people’s lives. For instance, as city densities exponentially increased & larger apartment buildings were constructed in the United States there was a massive increase in fires that would destroy entire buildings & lives. To help combat this problem, Hjalmar Carlson developed the overhead sprinkler system which can be seen on ceilings around the world today. Not nearly as impactful but he also developed an early version of today’s bottle cap."

== Patents, a selection ==
- Patent US984647 - Hanger-block, 1909–12
- Patent US1165316 - Method of making bicycle crank-hangers, 1912–15
- Patent US1185543 - Valve for automatic sprinkler systems, &c, 1913–16
- Patent US1572379 - Flier, 1924–26
