= Fred L. Dornbrook =

American mechanical engineer and inventor

Frederick L. Dornbrook (April 4, 1875 – May 17, 1967) was an American mechanical engineer and inventor, who was chief engineer of the Power Plants of the Wisconsin Electric Power Company, now part of WEC Energy Group. He was especially known as pioneer in the use of pulverized coal, and in 1949 was awarded the ASME Medal.

Dornbrook was born in Wisconsin as son of John Dornbrook and Henrietta (Schultz) Dornbrook. After regular education, he started his lifelong career at the Wisconsin Electric Power Company, where he worked for five decades at its Power Plant department. He worked his way up from coal passer, fireman, oiler and assistant engineer to chief engineer of operation. Eventually he was appointed superintendent of power plants and chief engineer of power plants—Wisconsin Electric Power Company.

In 1948 the University of Wisconsin–Madison College of Engineering awarded him a Distinguished Service Award. In 1949 the ASME awarded him the ASME Medal.

== Selected publications ==
- Dornbrook, F.L. "Developments in Burning Pulverized Coal." Mechanical Engineering 70, 967–974 (1948)

Patents, a selection

- Dornbrook, Frederick L. "Safety appliance for steam-boilers." U.S. Patent No. 1,293,730. 11 Feb. 1919.
- Dornbrook, Fred L. "Boiler soot-blower." U.S. Patent No. 1,337,828. 20 Apr. 1920.
- Dornbrook, Fred L. "Apparatus for handling pulverulent materials." U.S. Patent No 1,844,642, 1932.
- Dornbrook, Fred L. "Supplementary auxiliary apparatus for prime movers." U.S. Patent No 2,347,471, 1944.
- Dornbrook, Fred L. "Steam turbine control mechanism." U.S. Patent No 2,409,024, 1946.
