= Frederick G. Keyes =

American chemist

Frederick George Keyes (June 24, 1885 – April 14, 1976) was an American physical chemist. Keyes was most notable for inventing a method to sterilize milk using ultraviolet rays, and discovering that ultraviolet rays kill germs. According to the National Academies Press, Keyes was also notable for "advances in thermodynamics, equations of state of gases, and thermodynamic properties, in particular liquid water and steam".

Keyes received a B.Sc. degree from the University of Rhode Island and an M.Sc. and Ph.D. from Brown University.

Keyes was head of the department of chemistry at MIT, and was a member of the National Academy of Sciences, the American Academy of Arts and Sciences, and the American Philosophical Society.
