= Wilbur H. Armacost =

American mechanical engineer and inventor

- Born: Wilbur Hering Armacost, Jr. August 6, 1893; Green Valley, Illinois
- Died: September 23, 1971 (aged 78); Litchfield Park, Arizona
- Resting place: Prairie Rest Cemetery
- Education: Armour Institute of Technology
- Parents: Daniel Nicholas Armacost (father); Mary Ellen McCord (mother)
- Engineering career
- Discipline: Mechanical engineering
- Awards: 1948 ASM; 1951 Stevens Honor Award Medallion; 1958 ASME Medal

Wilbur Hering Armacost, Jr. (August 6, 1893 - September 23, 1971) was an American mechanical engineer, vice president-consultant of Combustion Engineering, Inc., New York, and inventor. He is known as pioneer developer of materials adaptable to high temperatures and pressure, and designer of high-temperature high-pressure steam engines. He was recipient of the 1958 ASME Medal for distinguished service in engineering and science.

== Biography ==
=== Youth, family education, and early career ===
Armacost was born in the 1893 in Green Valley, Illinois, son of Daniel Nicholas Armacost (1851–1940), and Mary Ellen (McCord) Armacost (1857–1947). Armacost was named after his grandfather Wilbur Hering Armacost, Sr., who had been a tax collector in the 8th district in Western Maryland.

Armacost graduated from the Armour Institute of Technology, now Illinois Institute of Technology, with a BSc in mechanical engineering in 1916. He had written a BSc thesis with Frederic P. Strauch, entitled "Capacity and efficiency test of an autovacuum refrigerating machine."

After his graduation in 1916 he started working as engineer at the Union Stock Yard & Transit Co. in the meatpacking district in Chicago, and became member of the American Society of Mechanical Engineers. Next he worked for the Armour and Company in Chicago as superintendent of 1600 boiler at the H-P plant for reclaiming potash from cotton seed in 1916-17.

=== Further career and acknowledgement ===
In the interbellum Armacost worked as research and design engineer for the Ford Motor Company in Detroit, and the Locomotive Superheater Company, before it merged into and Combustion Engineering in 1948. In 1937 Armacost started at Combustion Engineering as chief engineer.

In 1944 he was elected vice-president of the Combustion Engineering Co. in charge of marine activities, to succeed the late engineer and inventor F. H. Rosencrants. and in 1948 vice-president in charge of engineering. Bij 1958 Armacost was vice president-consultant and chairman of the technical committee at Combustion Engineering.

Armacost received an award for distinguished service from the American Society for Metals (ASM) in 1948, the Stevens Honor Award Medallion from the Stevens Institute of Technology in 1951, and the ASME Medal from the ASME in 1958. He received about 75 patents.

Armacost died September 23, 1971, in Litchfield Park, Arizona, and he was buried at the Prairie Rest Cemetery in Tazewell County, Illinois.

== Selected publications ==
- Frederic P Strauch & Wilbur H Armacost. Capacity and efficiency test of an autovacuum refrigerating machine. Armour Institute of Technology, 1916

Patents, a selection

- Armacost, Wilbur H. "Boiler with reheater." U.S. Patent No. 1,931,948. 24 Oct. 1933.
- Armacost, Wilbur H., and David M. Schoenfeld. "Gas turbine plant." U.S. Patent No. 2,404,938. 30 Jul. 1946.
- Armacost, Wilbur H. "Combined radiant and convection superheater." U.S. Patent No. 2,213,185. 3 Sep. 1940.
- Armacost, Wilbur H., and Leonard J. Marshall. "Art of generating and heating steam." U.S. Patent No. 2,781,746. 19 Feb. 1957.
- Armacost, Wilbur H. "Apparatus and method for controlling a forced flow once-through steam generator." U.S. Patent No. 3,038,453. 12 Jun. 1962.
