= Jack Howard (cricketer) =

English cricketer

Jack Howard (24 November 1917 – 17 September 1998) was an English cricketer active from 1946 to 1948 who played for Leicestershire. He was born and died in Leicester. He appeared in 41 first-class matches as a lefthanded batsman who occasionally kept wicket and scored 589 runs with a highest score of 38 not out.
