= Glenn B. Warren =

American mechanical engineer (1898–1979)

Glenn Barton Warren (February 28, 1898 – January 11, 1979) was an American mechanical engineer, business executive and inventor, who was vice president and general manager of the turbine division of General Electric. In 1951 he was awarded the ASME Medal.

Born in Rich Hill, Missouri, Warren grew up in Girard, Kansas. He obtained his BSc at the University of Wisconsin in 1919 with a thesis on combined gas-steam cycles. After graduating in 1919, he started his lifelong career at General Electric. He started as member of the Test Engineering Program, and made it vice president and general manager of the turbine division at General Electric.

Warren was awarded the ASME Medal in 1951, and in the year 1959-60 served as president of the American Society of Mechanical Engineers (ASME). In 1964, he was elected an honorary member of ASME. In 1970 he was awarded the John Fritz Medal by the American Association of Engineering Societies.

== Selected publications ==
- Walter Edward Blowney, Glenn B. Warren. The Increase in Thermal Efficiency Due to Resuperheating in Steam Turbines. University of Wisconsin—Madison, 1924.
- Glenn B. Warren. Proposed Reciprocating Internal Combustion Engine with Constant Pressure Combustion: Combustion Chamber Separated from Cylinders (modified Brayton Cycle). Society of Automotive Engineers, 1969.
- Glenn B. Warren, Some factors influencing motorcar fuel consumption in service, 1965.

Patents, a selection

- Glenn B. Warren. "Patent US1631660 - Elastic-eltrid turbine," 1927.
- Glenn B. Warren and Arthur R. Smith, "Patent US2451261 - High and low pressure turbine rotor cooling," 1948.
- Glenn B. Warren. "US2552239 - Turbine rotor cooling arrangement," 1951.
