= Arthur Howard (English cricketer) =

English cricketer

Arthur Howard (27 July 1882 – 5 August 1946) was an English cricketer active in 1921 who played for Leicestershire. He was born in Whitwick and died in Leicester. He appeared in three first-class matches as a righthanded batsman who scored 60 runs with a highest score of 27.
