= Alan Howard (engineer) =

American businessman

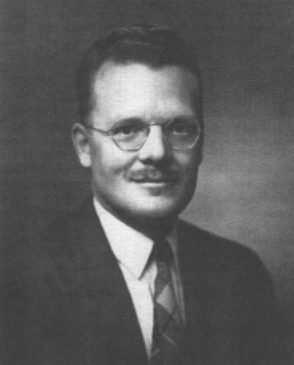
Alan Howard (1905-1966)

Alan Howard (August 19, 1905 – May 19, 1966) was an American engineer, general manager of the Gas Turbine Department at General Electric Co., and inventor. He was known as "one of the world's leading authorities on the development and application of gas turbines," and was a recipient of the 1964 ASME Medal.

== Biography ==
=== Youth, education and early career ===
Howard was born in Washington, D.C., in 1905. He obtained his BSc in electrical engineering from Purdue University in 1927.

After his graduation in 1927, Howard started his lifelong career at the General Electric Company in Schenectady, New York as electrical engineer. He advanced rapidly various positions, and moved into steam turbine activities in 1941.

=== Further career and acknowledgement ===
In World War II at General Electric, Howard managed the development of aircraft gas turbine engine for the United States Air Force, and developed the TG 100 and TG 180 turboprop engine. After the war, Howard became responsible for the "development of all GE's heavy-duty, industrial gas turbines, including the first locomotive gas turbine in the United States." In 1949, Howard had been appointed assistant to the vice-president and general manager, and in 1951, he became appointed general manager of the gas turbine department.

Howard had been awarded the Charles E. Coffin Award by General Electric for his "accomplishments in connection with the design and development of the TG100 and TG180 aircraft gas turbines." In 1954, he was awarded the honorary degree of doctor of engineering by Purdue University. In 1962, he had been elected Fellow of the American Society of Mechanical Engineers, and in 1964, he was awarded the ASME Medal.

== Selected publications ==
- Arthur H. Morey and Alan Howard, "Gas turbine power plant." U.S. Patent No. 2,403,388. 2 Jul. 1946.
- Alan Howard, "Gas turbine power plant with axial flow compressor," U.S. Patent No. 2.548,886. April 17, 1951.
- Alan, Howard, and Bruce O. Buckland. "Power plant frame structure having air-cooling means for turbine rotors and exhaust frame struts." U.S. Patent No. 2,591,399. 1 Apr. 1952.
