= Todd Arbogast =

American mathematician

Todd Arbogast is an American mathematician. He is a professor of mathematics at the University of Texas at Austin, where he is a W. A. "Tex" Moncrief, Jr. Simulation-Based Engineering and Sciences Professor and Frank E. Gerth III Faculty Fellow. His research concerns the numerical analysis of partial differential equations.

Arbogast did his undergraduate studies at the University of Minnesota, in mathematics and physics, graduating in 1981. He received his Ph.D. in mathematics from the University of Chicago in 1987 under the supervision of Jim Douglas, Jr.

In 2012, Arbogast became a Fellow of the American Mathematical Society.

== See also ==
Louis François Antoine Arbogast
