= Charles Gordon Curtis =

American Engineer

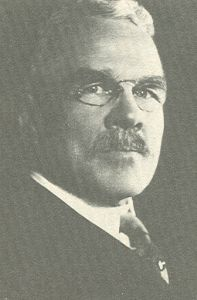
Charles Gordon Curtis

Charles Gordon Curtis (April 20, 1860 in Boston – March 1953 in Central Islip, Suffolk County, New York) was an American engineer, inventor, and patent attorney. He is best known as the developer of the eponymous Curtis steam turbine.

== Early life ==
Curtis graduated in 1881 from Columbia University with a degree in civil engineering, followed by two years at New York Law School.

== Career ==
After graduating in 1883, Curtis worked first as a patent attorney, then started his own patent law firm. Eight years later, he partnered with friends Charles Crocker and Schuyler S. Wheeler to form 'The Curtis, Crocker, Wheeler Company', with the intention of making and marketing electric appliances, such as motors and fans.

=== Steam turbine ===
In 1896, Curtis patented two types of steam turbines. He combined the principles of the Laval turbine and the Parsons turbine into a multi-stage impulse turbine (similar to the independently developed Rateau Turbine). Curtis' turbine reached a lower efficiency than the Parsons' turbine. It was, however, much smaller and simpler in design, thus making it suitable for simple applications and mobile use (e.g.on steamships).

Curtis spoke to various companies about his turbines, but met no interest until he met Edwin W. Rice of General Electric. In 1901 he sold the rights to his patent to GE.

The Curtis turbine was developed by the International Marine Curtis Turbine Company for use as in marine propulsion, which in turn licensed it to the British shipyard John Brown & Company. The latter built the Brown-Curtis turbine used in many ships in the Royal Navy.

In 1910, Curtis was awarded the Rumford Premium Prize of the American Academy of Arts and Sciences for his improvements to the steam turbine.

=== Gas turbine and others ===
In 1899 Curtis developed the first functioning gas turbine in the United States. To this end, Curtis received the annual award of the gas turbine Division of ASME in 1948 and the Holley Medal of ASME in 1950.

In addition to the above-mentioned turbines, Curtis worked on improvements to internal combustion engines (on two-stroke diesel engines) and on the drive of torpedoes.

== Bibliography ==
- Encyclopedia Britannica Online: Charles Gordon Curtis (14 Oct. 2008)
- Charles Gordon Curtis ASME.org
- Harris, F R, The Parsons Centenary-a hundred years of steam turbines
