= New Electronics =

- Discipline: Electronic Engineering Design
- Language: English
- Edited by: Neil Tyler

Publication details
- Publisher: Findlay Media Limited (UK)
- Frequency: Bi-weekly

Standard abbreviations
- ISO 4: New Electron.

Indexing
- ISSN: 0047-9624
- OCLC no.: 1063337321

Links
- Journal homepage

New Electronics is a British bi-weekly magazine dedicated to UK electronic engineering design. It was established in 1968 and is published by Findlay Media

The magazine is available both in print and electronic format and is free for electronic design engineers. New Electronics reaches a circulation 12,401, which is audited annually by the ABC (Auditing Bureau of Circulations).

The magazine covers a range of topics including news, technology features, product information and interviews with industry experts.

== Website ==
The New Electronics magazine has a complementary website, created to provide engineers and managers with up-to-date information about the electronics industry. Much like the magazine it features news and technology articles, product information and interviews, but also incorporates interactive elements such as videos and blogs.

The New Electronics website also houses an electronic engineering jobs site.

== Awards ==
New Electronics are organisers of the annual British Engineering Excellence Awards. The awards are in their third year and aim to promote the success of British companies competing on a global scale.
