= Saint Arbogast =

7th-century missionary; Bishop of Strasbourg

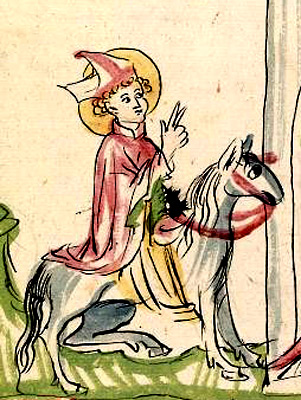
- Arbogast entering Strasbourg, illustration from the Alsacian Legenda Aurea (1419)
- Died: c. 678 AD; Austrasia
- Venerated in: Catholic Church; Eastern Orthodox Church
- Feast: 21 July

Arbogast of Strassburg; German: Arbogast von Straßburg; French: Arbogast de Strasbourg; Latin: Arbogastus; c. 600s) was a 7th-century missionary in the Frankish Empire and an early Bishop of Strasbourg.

== Biography ==
Only little historical facts of his life can be stated with certainty, other than that he came to Francia, was appointed Bishop of Strasbourg and was venerated from the early medieval period as the saint who brought Christianity to the Alsace. Because of this, the given name Arbogast became especially popular in the region. His origin is variously given as Scotland or Ireland, Aquitania or Francia.

According to the vita, a 10th-century hagiographical account of his life, Arbogast found a warm friend in the Merovingian King Dagobert. On Dagobert's accession, Arbogast was appointed Bishop of Strasbourg, and was famed for sanctity and miracles.

Still according to the vita, Arbogast brought back to life Dagobert's son, Siegebert, who had been killed by a fall from his horse. Siegebert had been boar hunting with his father's huntsmen in forests along the Ill River near Ebersheim, and became separated from the others. He encountered a boar, and his startled horse reared, throwing him and trampling him while his foot was caught in his stirrup. His companions found him and took him home, where he died the next day. King Dagobert summoned Arbogast, and the holy man prayed to Saint Mary, mother of Jesus: as she had carried the life of the entire world, would she not intercede for the life of this one boy? Siegebert stood up in his burial shroud. When the king offered bishop Arbogast money in reward, he declined, suggesting instead that land be donated to build a cathedral at Strasbourg.

Arbogast built a small hermitage outside the city, on the banks of the River Ill to which he had frequent recourse.

According to the vita, he was buried outside of the city. He was buried either in the old Roman necropolis or on the side of Hangman's Hill, where a gallows was located and only malefactors were interred. The site of his burial was subsequently deemed suitable for a church, and a chapel to was built in honor of St Michael. Arbogast is commemorated on 21 July.

Arbogast appears on the coat of arms of Batzendorf.

== Sources ==
- Ward, Donald (translator), The German Legends of the Brothers Grimm, Vol. II, Institute for the Study of the Human Issues, Philadelphia (1981), legend 437.

Catholic Church titles
Preceded by Solarius	Bishop of Strasbourg unknown	Succeeded by Florentius
