= Kaushik Bhattacharya =

American material scientist

- Education: University of Minnesota
- Scientific career
- Fields: Material Science, Mechanical Engineering
- Workplaces: Caltech; Courant Institute of Mathematical Sciences
- Thesis: Microstructure of Martensite (1991)
- Doctoral advisor: Richard James

Kaushik Bhattacharya is an Indian American mechanician and material scientist. He is currently the Howell N. Tyson, Sr., Professor of Mechanics and Professor of Materials Science at the California Institute of Technology (Caltech). He is also vice-provost at Caltech.

Bhattacharya is known for his mathematical and computational contributions to material science, especially the study of microstructure.

== Education and career ==
Bhattacharya received a B.Tech degree from the Indian Institute of Technology, Madras, in 1986. He received his Ph.D. in 1991 from the University of Minnesota under the supervision of Richard James. He was a post-doctoral associate at the Courant Institute of Mathematical Sciences between 1991 and 1993. He joined Caltech in 1993 and has held visiting positions at Cornell University (1988), Heriot-Watt University (1992), Max Planck Institute for Mathematics in the Sciences (1997-98), Isaac Newton Institute at the University of Cambridge (1999), Indian Institute of Science (2001) and the Jet Propulsion Laboratory (2006). In 2016, he was named vice provost at Caltech. He also served as editor of the Journal of the Mechanics and Physics of Solids from 2004 to 2015.

== Awards and recognition ==
- Koiter Medal in 2015 awarded by the American Society of Mechanical Engineers
- Theodore von Kármán Prize in 2020 awarded by the Society for Industrial and Applied Mathematics.
- Infosys Prize in 2023 awarded by the Infosys Science foundation.
