= Alan Needleman =

American professor (born 1944)

- Education: Harvard University
- Employers: Brown University (1996–2009); Massachusetts Institute of Technology; University of North Texas
- Awards: Guggenheim Fellowship (applied mathematics, 1977); Timoshenko Medal (University of North Texas, 2011); Drucker Medal (2006); William Prager Medal (2006); honorary doctor of the École normale supérieure de Cachan (2006)
- Scientific career
- Workplaces: Brown University (1996–2009); Massachusetts Institute of Technology; University of North Texas
- Doctoral advisor: John W. Hutchinson
- Doctoral students: Nicolas Triantafyllidis

Alan Needleman (born September 2, 1944) is a professor of materials science & engineering at Texas A&M University. Prior to 2009, he was Florence Pirce Grant University Professor of Mechanics of Solids and Structures at Brown University in Providence, Rhode Island.

== Early life and education ==
Needleman received his B.S. from the University of Pennsylvania in 1966, an M.S. and Ph.D. from Harvard University in 1967 and 1970 respectively, advised by John W. Hutchinson.

== Research and career ==
He was an instructor and assistant professor in the Department of Applied Mathematics at the Massachusetts Institute of Technology from 1970 to 1975. He was a professor of engineering at Brown University starting in 1975, and served as the dean of the Engineering Department from 1988 to 1991. He was the chair of the Applied Mechanics Division.

Needleman's main research interests are in the computational modeling of deformation and fracture processes in structural materials, in particular metals. A general objective is to provide quantitative relations between the measurable (and hopefully controllable) features of the materials' micro-scale structure and its macroscopic mechanical behavior. Ongoing research projects involve studies of ductile fracture and ductile-brittle transitions; crack growth in heterogeneous microstructures with particular emphasis on the role of interfaces; nonlocal and discrete dislocation plasticity; fatigue crack growth; and fast fracture in brittle solids.

Professor Needleman often collaborates with Viggo Tvergaard, John Hutchinson, Subra Suresh, and Erik van der Giessen among others in both materials science and mechanics.

== Awards and honors ==
Needleman is a member of the National Academy of Engineering, a fellow of the American Society of Mechanical Engineers, a fellow of the American Academy of Mechanics, an honorary member of MECAMAT (Groupe Français de Mecanique des Matériaux) and a foreign member of the Danish Center for Applied Mathematics and Mechanics. He has been recognized by Institute for Scientific Information (ISI) Science Citation Index as a highly cited author both in engineering and in materials science. In 1994, his work on 3D modeling of metallic fracture was a finalist in the Science Category for the Computerworld-Smithsonian Award. In 2006 he was the recipient of both the William Prager Medal and the Drucker Medal and received an Honorary Doctorate from Technical University of Denmark (DTU). He is also the recipient of Timoshenko Medal in 2011.

== Selected publications ==
- V. Tvergaard; A. Needleman (January 1984). "Analysis of the cup-cone fracture in a round tensile bar". Acta metallurgica. 32 (1): 157–169. doi:10.1016/0001-6160(84)90213-x. ISSN 0001-6160. Wikidata Q105187572.
- A. Needleman (1 September 1987). "A Continuum Model for Void Nucleation by Inclusion Debonding". Journal of Applied Mechanics. 54 (3): 525–531. doi:10.1115/1.3173064. ISSN 0021-8936. Zbl 0626.73010. Wikidata Q105184969.
- X.-P. Xu; A. Needleman (September 1994). "Numerical simulations of fast crack growth in brittle solids". Journal of the Mechanics and Physics of Solids. 42 (9): 1397–1434. doi:10.1016/0022-5096(94)90003-5. ISSN 0022-5096. Zbl 0825.73579. Wikidata Q56432783.
