= Yonggang Huang =

Chinese American mechanical engineer

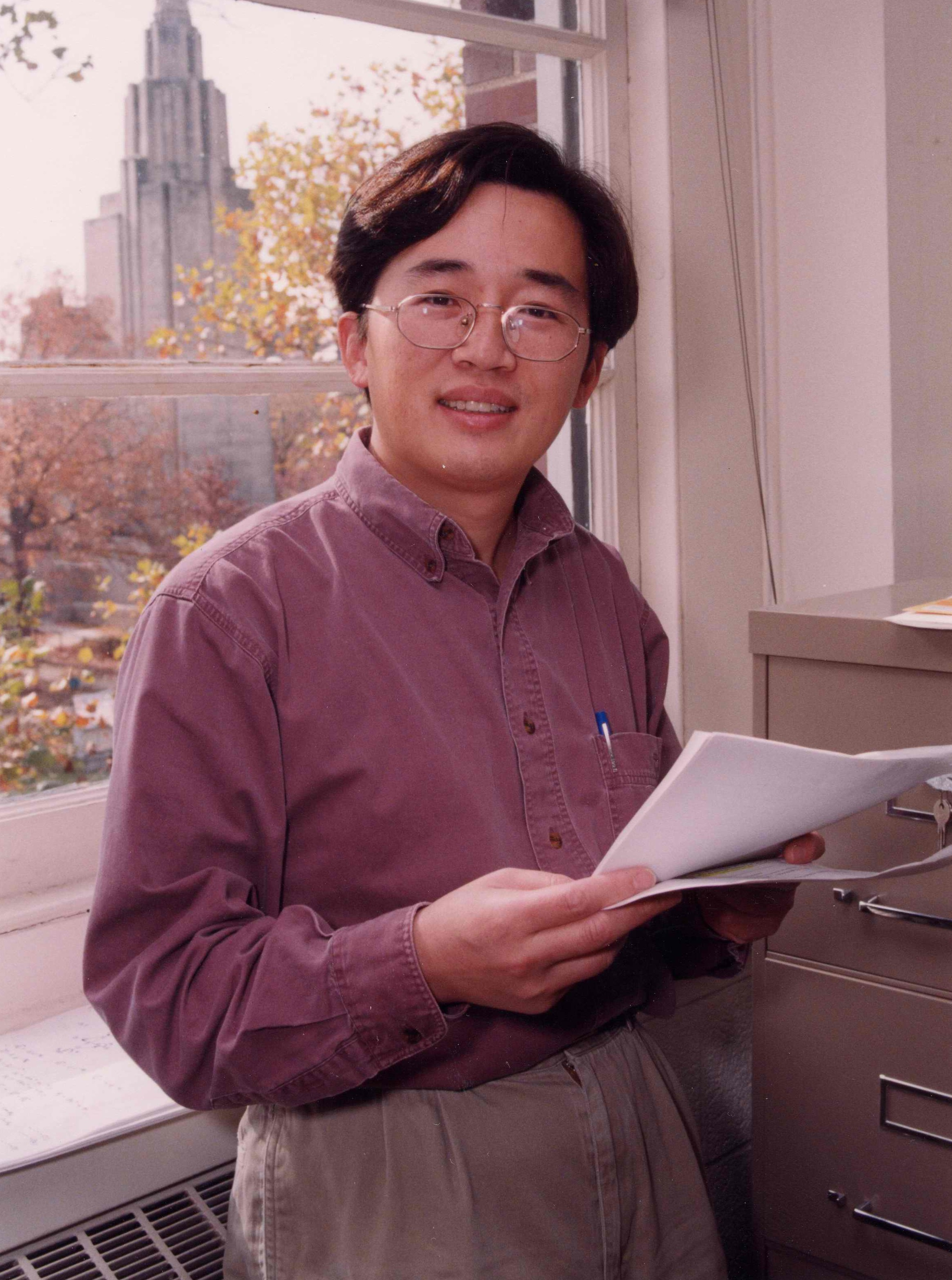
- Born: 2 November 1962 (age 64); Beijing, China
- Citizenship: United States
- Education: Peking University, Harvard University
- Known for: Mechanics of materials and structures across multiple scales Mechanics of stretchable and dissolvable electronics Mechanics-guided, deterministic 3D assembly
- Awards: Guggenheim Fellowship (2008), National Academy of Engineering (2017), ASCE van Karman Medal (2019), American Academy of Arts and Sciences (2020), National Academy of Sciences (2020), Foreign Member, The Royal Society of London (2023) International Fellow, Royal Academy of Engineering (2025) ASME Medal (2026)
- Scientific career
- Fields: Mechanics of materials and structures
- Workplaces: University of Arizona; Michigan Technological University; University of Illinois at Urbana-Champaign (UIUC); Northwestern University

Yonggang Huang (Chinese: 黄永刚; born 1962) is the Jan and Marcia Achenbach Professor of Mechanical Engineering (50%), Civil and Environmental Engineering (50%), and Materials Science and Engineering (0%) at Northwestern University.

Huang was elected a member of the National Academy of Engineering in 2017, a member of National Academy of Sciences and a fellow of American Academy of Arts and Sciences in 2020, a foreign member of Royal Society, London in 2023, a foreign member of Royal Academy of Engineering in 2025, and a Honorary Fellow of the European Academy of Sciences in 2026 (2 Honorary Fellows are elected each year. The other recipient in 2026 is Ingrid Daubechies, recipient of Wolf Prize and US National Medal of Science.). He was the 5th person in the history elected as a foreign (international) member of both Royal Society and Royal Academy of Engineering [4th from USA, after Frances Arnold (Nobel Laurette), Steven Chu (Nobel Laurette) and Vincent Poor]. He is ranked #1 worldwide in the 2026 Edition of Ranking of Best Scientists in the field of Mechanical and Aerospace Engineering by Research.com, 2026.

== Education and career ==
Yonggang Huang received his BS degree in mechanics from Peking University in 1984. He moved to the United States to study engineering science in 1986, and earned his ScM and PhD degrees in engineering science (advisor: John W. Hutchinson) from Harvard University in 1987 and 1990, respectively. He stayed at Harvard as a post-doctoral fellow (advisors: Bernard Budiansky and James R. Rice) for one year, and joined the University of Arizona as an assistant professor in 1991. He moved to Michigan Technological University as an associate professor in 1995, and to University of Illinois at Urbana-Champaign (UIUC) in 1998. He was promoted to full professor in 2001, Grayce Wicall Gauthier Professor in 2003, and Shao Lee Soo Professor in 2004, at UIUC. He joined Northwestern University as the Joseph Cummings Professor in 2007, became the Walter P. Murphy Professor in 2015, and has been the Jan and Marcia Achenbach Professor of Mechanical Engineering since 2020.

== Research interests ==
Huang has been working on mechanics of materials and structures across multiple scales, such as the mechanism-based strain gradient plasticity theory, and atomistic-based continuum theory for carbon nanotubes. In recent years he has focused on mechanics of stretchable electronics with applications to medicine, and mechanically guided, deterministic 3D assembly. His work on the electronic tattoos has been reported by NBC Learn (the education arm of NBC).

== Service to the academic societies ==
He is the Editor-in-Chief of Applied Mechanics Reviews (an ASME Journal); under his leadership the journal impact factor reached 19.1 in 2026, and is the second highest among all mechanics journals according to Journal Citation Reports. In 2024 it was ranked #7 among all mechanical engineering journals according to Citescore, below Nature Materials, Materials Science and Engineering R: Reports, Advanced Materials, Materials Today, Science Robotics, and International Materials Reviews. He is co-Editor-in-Chief of International Journal of Mechanical System Dynamics, and Reviews Editor for Proceedings of the Royal Society A.

Huang was the Editor-in-Chief of the Journal of Applied Mechanics (Transactions of ASME), and transformed the journal to be the fastest one in mechanics. For example, among all papers submitted in 2017, the average time from submission to final decision (i.e., reject or accept) is less than 16 days, which include the time for review and the time for the authors’ revision (if needed). The journal impact factor quadrupled under his leadership. He also served as the co-Editor-in-Chief of Theoretical and Applied Mechanics Letters.

For Society of Engineering Sciences, he was a member of the Board of Directors (2012-2015), Vice President (2013), President (2014), and Past President (2015).

For ASME, he was a member of the Executive Committee (2015-2020), Co-Chair (2016–2017) and Chair (2017-2018) of the mechanics track for IMECE conference, Vice Chair (2018-2019) and Chair (2019–2020) of the Applied Mechanics Division. He was a member of the Drucker Medal Committee (2014-2015), Nadai Medal Committee (2017-2020), Pi Tau Sigma Awards Committee (2018-2022), Awards Committee of the Applied Mechanics Division (2020-2025), Thurston Lecture Award Committee (2023-2024), and Search Committee for Editor-in-Chief of Journal of Applied Mechanics (2026). He is a member of the Journal of Applied Mechanics Award Committee (2023-) and Donnell Applied Mechanics Reviews Paper Award Committee (2024-).

For American Society of Civil Engineers, he was a member of the Awards Committee (2016-2018) and Nomination Committee (2016-2018) of the Engineering Mechanics Institute, Bazant Medal Committee (2019-2020, 2023-2024), Mindlin Medal Committee (2020-2021), and von Karman Medal Committee (2021-2023, chair 2025-2026).

For the US National Committee of Theoretical and Applied Mechanics, he is a member (2018-2022, 2024-2028), chaired the Solid Mechanics Subcommittee for IUTAM papers (2020), and was on the Nomination Subcommittee (2022).

He is a member of the selection committee for Eshelby Mechanics Award for Young Faculty (2012-), and JN Reddy Medal Committee (2023-2027).

For National Academy of Engineering, he was a member of the Committee of Membership (2022-2023), a member (2020-2023), Vice Chair (2021-2022) and Chair (2022-2023) of the Peer Committee and a member of the Search Committee (2021-2023) for Mechanical Engineering Section, and a member of the NAE 2025 Nominating Committee for election of NAE president, officers, and council members. He was the secretary (2022-2024) and Vice Chair (2024-2026), and is the Chair (2026-2028) of the Mechanical Engineering Section.

For National Academy of Sciences, he was a member of the Temporary Nominating Group (2022-2026) and Voluntary Nominating Group (2025-2026) for Class III (including applied math, applied physics, computer science, and engineering). He is a member of the Class Membership Committee (2025-2029) for Class III, and the chair of its Engineering Section (2026-2029). He is on the Editorial Board for the Proceedings of the National Academy of Sciences of the United States of America (PNAS), and is a member of the PNAS Cozzarelli Prize Committee for Class III.

For Royal Society (London), he was a member (2023-2026) and the chair (2024-2026) of Sectional Committee 4: Engineering and Materials Science. He is the only foreign member in the Royal Society history to serve as the chair of an election committee.

For International Union of Theoretical and Applied Mechanics, he is a member in the Congress Committee (2024-2028).

For US National Association for Computational Mechanics, he was a member in the Belytschko Medal Committee (2025).

For International Congress of Basic Science, he is a member in the Medal Selection Committee in Engineering and Computer Science (2026, 2027).

For Tencent Foundation, he is a nominator for the Xplorer Prize (2026).

For Royal Society of Canada, he is a member of the Paidoussis Medal Committee (2026).

He has served on the review committee for many engineering programs at institutions across the world (e.g., Massachusetts Institute of Technology). These include civil and environmental engineering, electrical engineering and computer science, high-performance computation, interdisciplinary research, materials science and engineering, mechanical engineering, and mechanics.

== Awards and Recognitions ==
Yonggang Huang is a member of US National Academy of Engineering, a member of US National Academy of Sciences, a fellow of American Academy of Arts and Sciences, a foreign member of the European Academy of Sciences and Arts, a foreign member of Academia Europaea, a foreign member of Chinese Academy of Sciences, a foreign member of Canadian Academy of Engineering, an international fellow of Royal Society of Canada, a foreign member of Royal Society, London, and an international member of Royal Academy of Engineering. He is a Highly Cited Researcher in Engineering (2009), in Materials Science and Engineering (2014-), in Physics (2018), and in Biology and Biochemistry(2026). He was recognized by the inaugural Mechanical and Aerospace Engineering Leader Award for 2023 by Research.com, ranked #4 in USA and #6 worldwide in the 2023 Edition of Ranking of Best Scientists in the field of Mechanical and Aerospace Engineering. He was ranked
--#4 in USA and #4 worldwide in the 2024 Edition of Ranking of Best Scientists in the field of Mechanical and Aerospace Engineering, 2024,
--#3 in USA and #3 worldwide in the 2025 Edition, and
--#1 worldwide in the 2026 Edition.

Yonggang Huang has been honored with many recognitions for his research in mechanics and mechanical engineering including
--Research Fellowship for US Scientists and Scholars (2001) and Research Award (2024) from Alexander von Humboldt Foundation;
--Larson Award (2003), Melville Medal (2004), Richards Award (2010), Drucker Medal (2013), Nadai Medal (2016), ASME Robert Henry Thurston Lecture Award (2019) (2019), Honorary Member (2021) and ASME Medal (2026) from the American Society of Mechanical Engineers (ASME);
--Young Investigator Medal (2006) and Prager Medal (2017) from the Society of Engineering Sciences (SES);
--International Journal of Plasticity Medal (2007);
--Guggenheim Fellowship (2008) from the John Simon Guggenheim Memorial Foundation;
--Bazant Medal (2018) and von Karman Medal (2019) from the American Society of Civil Engineers (ASCE);
--J.N. Reddy Medal (2022) from the journal Mechanics of Advanced Materials and Structures;
--Honorary Degree in Mechanical Engineering (2023) from University of Parma, Italy (approved by Italian Ministry of University and Research);
--Cataldo Agostinelli e Angiola Gili Agostinelli International Prize for Mechanics (2023) from the Accademia Nazionale dei Lincei (“Lincei” National Academy of Sciences), Italy;
--Hill Prize (2024) from International Union of Theoretical and Applied Mechanics;
--Paidoussis Medal (2024) from Royal Society of Canada;
--Atluri Medal (2025) from International Conference on Computational & Experimental Engineering and Sciences;
--Beltrami Senior Scientist Prize from the journal Mathematics & Mechanics of Complex Systems; and
--Honorary Fellow from European Academy of Sciences [2 Honorary Fellows are elected each year. According to the description on its website, “Honorary Fellows are distinguished scientists of exceptional international recognition (e.g., Nobel Prize, Fields Medal, Wolf Prize, Abel Prize, or equivalent)”. The other recipient in 2026 is Ingrid Daubechies, recipient of Wolf Prize and US National Medal of Science. The recipients in 2025 were Pablo Jarillo-Herrero and Helmut Schwarz, both recipients of Wolf Prize.]

Yonggang Huang’s papers have received recognitions: Paper on stretchable silicon (Science, 2006) selected for one of “10 Technologies That Will Change the World” by MIT Technology Review Magazine, 2006; Paper titled “An atomistic-based finite-deformation shell theory for single-wall carbon nanotubes” (JMPS, 2008) selected as a “Hot Paper” in engineering by Science Watch, May, 2009 (one paper is selected from all fields of engineering every two months based on citation); Work on stretchable electronics selected as the cover of the National Science Foundation budget request to United States Congress for fiscal year 2011; Paper titled “Mechanics of hemispherical electronics” selected by the Editors at Applied Physics Letters as one of the most notable papers in recent years, for highlight in the 50th anniversary edition of the journal, 2012; Work on epidermal electronics featured by NBC Learn, the education arm of NBC, 2013; Paper titled “Mechanics and thermal management of stretchable inorganic electronics” (National Science Review, 2016) received the Outstanding Paper Award, National Science Review, 2017; Paper titled “Epidermal radio frequency electronics for wireless power transfer” (Microsystems & Nanoengineering, 2016) awarded “An Outstanding Paper of Microsystems & Nanoengineering”, 2020. Paper titled “Flexible electronics with dynamic interfaces for biomedical monitoring, stimulation and characterization” received the Best Paper Award, International Journal of Mechanical System Dynamics, 2022. Paper titled “Millimetre-scale, bioresorbable optoelectronic systems for electrotherapy” (Nature, 2025) selected one of Time’s Best Inventions in 2025. He was an Honorary Professor from Nanjing University of Posts and Telecommunications, Xi’an Jiaotong University, Southwest Jiaotong University, Huazhong University of Science and Technology, Nanjing University of Science and Technology, Nanjing Tech University, Nanjing University of Aeronautics and Astronautics, Xiangtan University, Beihang University and Shanghai University.

Yonggang Huang’s recognitions for undergraduate teaching and advising include the Most Supportive Junior Faculty Member from the Department of Aerospace and Mechanical Engineering, University of Arizona in 1993; On the list of “Teachers Ranked as Excellent by Their Students” in Spring 2003, Spring and Fall 2004, Spring 2005, Fall 2006, and Spring 2007, University of Illinois at Urbana-Champaign; Engineering Council Award for Excellence in Advising from the College of Engineering, University of Illinois at Urbana-Champaign in 2007; Cole-Higgins Award for Excellence in Teaching (one award for a tenured/tenure-track faculty member in engineering each year), McCormick School of Engineering, Northwestern University in 2016 and 2024 (He is the only tenured/tenure-track faculty member to have won it twice in the award history); and Associated Student Government Faculty and Administrator Honor Roll, Northwestern University in 2018 and 2020.

== Honors Bearing His Name ==
In 2024 the Society of Engineering Science renamed its Engineering Science Medal to Yonggang Huang Engineering Science Medal.
--The inaugural recipient was Hanqing Jiang from West Lake University in 2025.
--The recipient in 2026 was Dimitris Lagoudas from Texas A&M University.
--The recipient in 2027 is Markus Buehler from Massachusetts Institute of Technology.

In 2025 the Hagler Institute for Advanced Study at Texas A&M University announced the John Rogers/Yonggang Huang Medal. This is an annual award ($10,000) for the best collaborative research paper by a Hagler Fellow with a Texas A&M student among the co-authors, and each co-author receives a Rogers/Huang Medal.
--The inaugural recipients were Edwin Thomas (Hagler Fellow) and Zhen Sang (Hagler Fellowship recipient) from Texas A&M University in 2025, for the paper “Supersonic puncture-healable and impact resistant covalent adaptive networks” by Sang Z, Eoh HK, Xiao KL, Kurouski D, Shan WP, Hyon JH, Sukhishvili SA, and Thomas EL, Materials Today, v 83, pp 43–53, 2025.
--The recipients in 2026 are Andrew Feinberg (Hagler Fellow) from Johns Hopkins University and Alexandra Naron (Ph.D. student) from Texas A&M University, for their paper “Non-Mendelian inheritance of DNA methylation patterns in mice” by Davidovich A, Cuomo D, Su H, Kambhampati S, Gong QQ, Naron A, Tryggvadottir R, McMillan L, Kasper DH, Threadgill DW, and Feinberg AP, Nature Genetics, v 58, pp 1409-1422, 2026.

In 2025 the International Conference on Computational & Experimental Engineering and Sciences established the John Rogers/Yonggang Huang Medal. This is an annual award for outstanding researchers (a single person or a pair who collaborate) with a strong, sustained history of collaboration in the general fields of engineering and science. The inaugural recipients are George Pharr from Texas A&M University and Warren Oliver from KLA Corporation in 2026.

== Publications ==
Professor Huang is the author of over 700 publications in international journals, including multidisciplinary journals (16 in Science, 24 in Science Advances, 10 in Nature, 23 in Nature Communications, 2 in Nature Protocols and 34 in the Proceedings of the National Academy of Sciences of the United States of America) and journals in multiple fields such as mechanics (54 papers in the Journal of the Mechanics and Physics of Solids), electronics (6 in Nature Electronics, 2 in Science Robotics, and 1 in Nature Sensors), materials (31 in Advanced Materials, 10 in Nature Materials, 1 in Nature Reviews Materials), mechanical engineering (1 in Nature Mechanical Engineering), medicine (1 in CELL, 2 in Neuron, 2 in Nature Biotechnology, 2 in Nature Medicine, 3 in Nature Neuroscience, 7 in Science Translational Medicine and 15 in Nature Biomedical Engineering), nanotechnology (12 in ACS Nano, 8 in Nano Letters and 2 in Nature Nanotechnology), physics (2 in Physical Review Letters), and other Nature Index journals (40 in Advanced Functional Materials, 1 in Angewandte Chemie International Edition, 16 in Applied Physics Letters and 2 in Energy & Environmental Science).
