= Hilary Bart-Smith =

Scottish mechanical engineer

Hilary Bart-Smith is a Scottish mechanical engineer known for her work on biologically inspired structures including robot fish. She is professor of mechanical and aerospace engineering at the University of Virginia, where she is the founder of both the Multifunctional Materials and Structures Laboratory and the Bio-inspired Engineering Research Laboratory.

== Education and career ==
Bart-Smith studied mechanical engineering at the University of Glasgow, graduating with first-class honours in 1995. She undertook a PhD in engineering sciences at Harvard University and was supervised by Anthony G. Evans and John W. Hutchinson. She completed her PhD in 2000.

After postdoctoral research at Princeton University, she joined the department of mechanical and aerospace engineering at the University of Virginia in 2002.

== Research ==
Bart-Smith's doctoral dissertation, Metallic Foams: Performance and Use in Ultralight Sandwich Structures, concerned the structural properties of metal foams and metal sandwich panels. Her subsequent research has included the development of underwater robot fish whose swimming motions mimic manta rays and tuna. Her research has also included the use of tensile structures to provide portable emergency shelter.
