= Vikram Deshpande =

Indian engineer

Vikram Deshpande FRS FREng
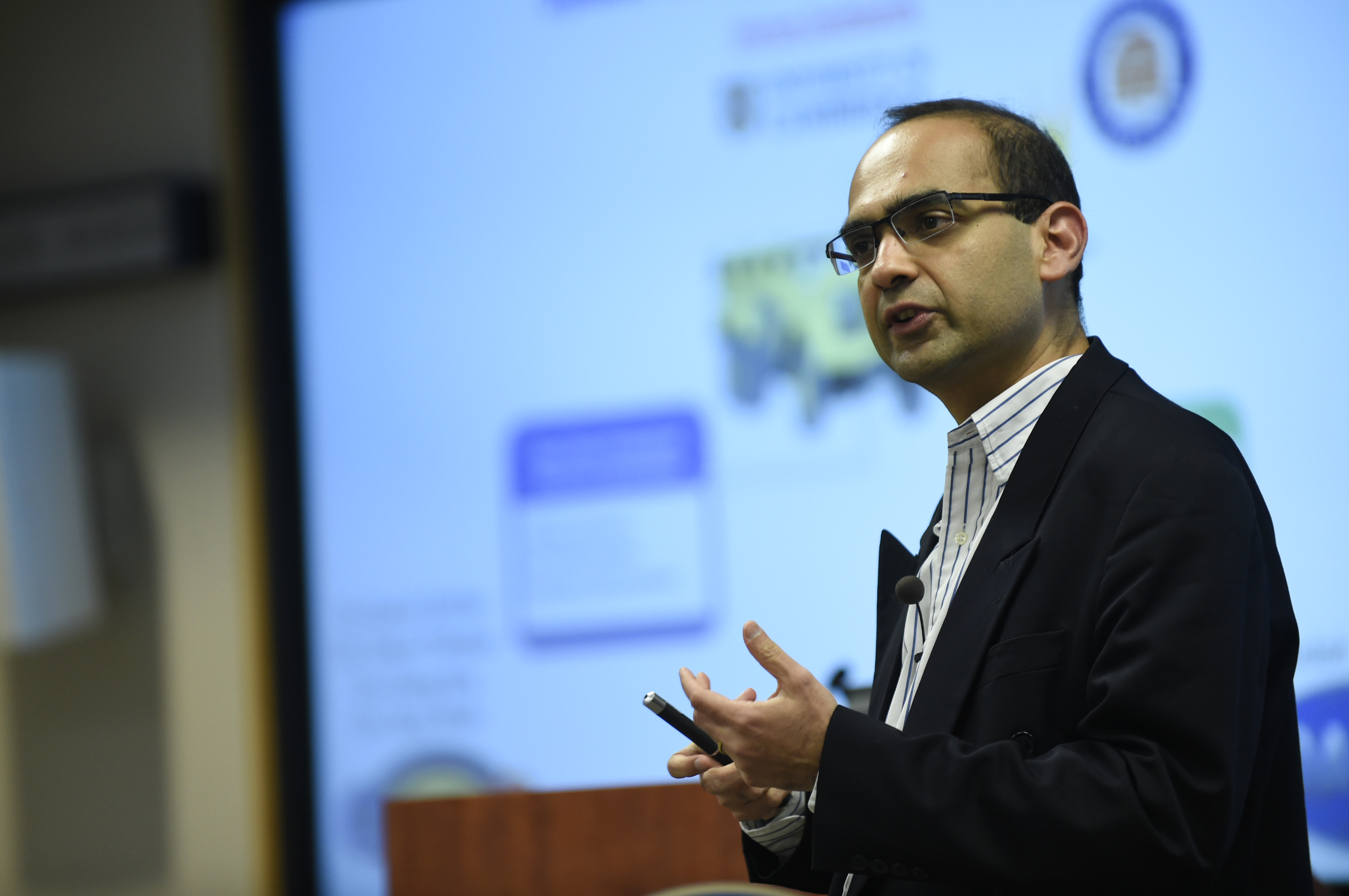
- Vikram Deshpande delivering a lecture at the Office of Naval Research in 2018
- Born: 29 February 1972 (age 54); Mumbai
- Education: Indian Institute of Technology; University of Cambridge
- Known for: Materials Engineering
- Awards: Nadai Medal 2025; Euromech Solid Mechanics prize 2025; Bazant Medal 2024; William Prager Medal 2022; Warner T. Koiter Medal 2022: Gili Agostinelli Prize 2021; Rodney Hill Prize 2020; Sir William Hopkins Prize 2018; Werner Koester Award 2017; Philip Leverhulme Prize 2003
- Scientific career
- Workplaces: University of Cambridge
- Website: Official website

Vikram Sudhir Deshpande (born 29 February 1972), is an Indian-born British engineer and materials scientist. He is currently Professor of Materials Engineering in the Department of Engineering at the University of Cambridge.

== Early life and education ==
Deshpande grew up in Dadar, Mumbai, studied at Bombay Scottish School in Mahim, and gained a B.Tech. from the Indian Institute of Technology in 1994. That year, he moved to Cambridge, UK to take an M.Phil. in engineering, initially working on transportation with David Cebon, and earning his Ph.D. in 1998.

== Career ==
Later, he became interested in materials and mechanics, including small-scale materials, and began a long collaboration with Norman Fleck on micro-architectured materials. After further research in the United States, he returned to Cambridge, became a fellow of Pembroke College in 1999, a lecturer in engineering in 2001, and a professor in 2010. He has been a visiting professor at Brown University and Università Campus Bio-Medico in Rome, on the faculty of University of California at Santa Barbara in the US, University of Eindhoven in the Netherlands. He is the current editor in chief of the Journal of the Mechanics and Physics of Solids (JMPS).

== Research and achievements ==
His achievements include the development of "metallic wood", which comprises nickel sheet with wood-like, nanoscale pores that make it as strong as titanium but four to five times lighter.

== Awards ==
Deshpande has received multiple awards for his work, including the Warner T. Koiter Medal from the American Society of Mechanical Engineers 2022, William Prager Medal, in 2022, the 2021 Gili Agostinelli Prize, the 2020 Rodney Hill Prize in Solid Mechanics awarded by IUTAM International Union of Theoretical and Applied Mechanics, the 2018 Sir William Hopkins Prize in Mathematical and Physical Sciences, and the 2003 Philip Leverhulme Prize. He was elected a Fellow of the Royal Society in 2020 in recognition of "significant contributions in fields ranging from the design of micro-architectured materials to modelling soft and active materials", "innovations [that] have helped define the modern frontiers of solid mechanics", and research that "has had a major impact in materials engineering". He was elected a Fellow of the Royal Academy of Engineering in 2023 for "seminal contributions to the mechanics of engineering materials". He was elected a foreign member of the National Academy of Engineering in 2023 "for contributions to mechanics of microarchitected solids with applications to structures under extreme dynamic loading".. In November 2024 he was awarded the Zdenek P. Bazant Medal for Failure and Damage Prevention for pioneering contributions to damage and failure prevention of metal alloys, lattice-cored sandwich structures, and micro-architected materials across length scales. In November 2025, he was awarded the Nadai Medal for his significant advancements in “microstructural mechanics” through pioneering new architected materials, linking theory and experiment across scales, and broadening the field of materials engineering with novel materials design, failure mechanics, and innovative applications. In August 2026, Deshpande was awarded the Satya N. Atluri ICCES Medal by the International Conference on Computational & Experimental Engineering and Sciences and the Tech Science Press to an individual who has had a significant impact on the world of engineering, the sciences, and commerce, and the well-being of the society at large as a result.

== Selected publications ==
- Deshpande, V.S.; Fleck, N.A. (1 June 2000). "Isotropic constitutive models for metallic foams". Journal of the Mechanics and Physics of Solids. 48 (6): 1253–1283. Bibcode:2000JMPSo..48.1253D. doi:10.1016/S0022-5096(99)00082-4.
- Deshpande, V.S.; Ashby, M.F.; Fleck, N.A. (April 2001). "Foam topology: bending versus stretching dominated architectures". Acta Materialia. 49 (6): 1035–1040. Bibcode:2001AcMat..49.1035D. doi:10.1016/S1359-6454(00)00379-7. ISSN 1359-6454.
- Deshpande, V.S.; Ashby, M.F.; Fleck, N.A. (1 August 2001). "Effective properties of the octet-truss lattice material". Journal of the Mechanics and Physics of Solids. 49 (8): 1747–1769. Bibcode:2001JMPSo..49.1747D. doi:10.1016/S0022-5096(01)00010-2. S2CID 53347572.
- Fleck, N.A.; Deshpande, V.S.; Ashby, M.F. (30 June 2010). "Micro-architectured materials: past, present and future". Proceedings of the Royal Society A: Mathematical, Physical and Engineering Sciences. 466 (2121): 2495–2516. Bibcode:2010RSPSA.466.2495F. doi:10.1098/rspa.2010.0215. S2CID 138092878.
