= Donald A. Danielson =

- Education: MIT; Harvard University
- Scientific career
- Fields: Applied Mathematics
- Workplaces: University of Virginia, University of California, San Diego, and Naval Postgraduate School
- Doctoral advisors: Bernard Budiansky and John W. Hutchinson

Donald A. Danielson is Professor Emeritus in the Department of Applied Mathematics and the Space Systems Academic Group at the Naval Postgraduate School.

== Early life and education ==
Danielson received a B.S. degree in mathematics from MIT in 1964 and a Ph.D. in applied mathematics from Harvard University in 1968.

== Career ==
Danielson joined the faculty of the University of Virginia in 1968. He moved to the University of California, San Diego in 1979, and to the Naval Postgraduate School in 1985. Danielson is an applied mathematician with contributions to structural mechanics, biomechanics, and orbital dynamics. Publications include: "Dynamic Buckling Loads of Imperfection Sensitive Structures from Perturbation Procedures", AIAA Journal 1506-1510 (1969); "Nonlinear Shell Theory with Finite Rotation and Stress Function Vectors", Journal of Applied Mechanics 1085 - 1090 (1972); "Human Skin as an Elastic Membrane", Journal of Biomechanics 539-546 (1973); "Tension Field Theory and the Stress in Stretched Skin", Journal of Biomechanics 135-142 (1975); "Tension Field Theories for Soft Tissues", Bulletin of Mathematical Biology 161-182 (1978); "A Beam Theory for Large Global Rotation, Moderate Local Rotation, and Small Strain", Journal of Applied Mechanics 179-184 (1988); "Fiber-optic Ellipsoidal Flextensional Hydrophones"; Journal of Lightwave Technology 1995-2002 (1989); "Parallelization of the Naval Space Surveillance Satellite Motion Model", Journal of Astronautical Sciences 207-216 (1993); "Semianalytic Satellite Theory", Naval Postgraduate School Technical Report NPS-MA-95-002 (1995); "The Naval Space Command Automatic Differential Correction Process", Proceedings of the AAS Astrodynamics Conference 991-1008 (1999); "Buckling of Stiffened Plates with Bulb Flat Flanges", International Journal of Solids and Structures 6407-6427 (2004). He also wrote a graduate textbook on Vectors and Tensors.
