= Cato Nathan =

American politician

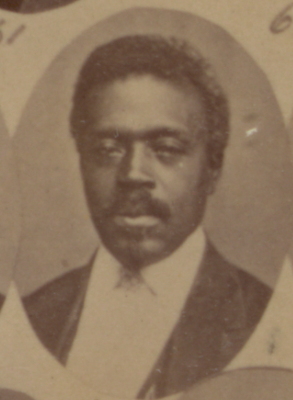

Cato Nathan was an American politician and state legislator in Mississippi. He represented Monroe County, Mississippi, in the Mississippi House of Representatives in 1874 and 1875. He represented Monroe County, Mississippi.

Nathan and A. P. Huggins were seated after an committee's investigation of the election.

Nathan and others signed a letter opposed convict labor outside penitentiaries. He reportedly refused a deal from R. K. Bruce.

== See also ==
- African American officeholders from the end of the Civil War until before 1900
