= Satya N. Atluri ICCES Medal =

Satya N. Atluri ICCES Medal is a Medal awarded annually by ICCES (International Conference on Computational & Experimental Engineering and Sciences) and Tech Science Press to an individual who has had a significant impact on the world of engineering, the sciences, and commerce, and the well-being of the society at large as a result. This Medal is presented at the Awards Banquet of the annual ICCES Conference. The recipient of the Medal is invited to deliver a Plenary Lecture, on a topic of her/his choosing, at the ICCES conference. This Medal honors Professor Satya N. Atluri of UCI, who founded ICCES in 1986, and founded the journals, "CMES: Computer Modeling in Engineering & Sciences" (2000), "CMC: Computers, Materials, & Continua" (2004), "MCB: Molecular & Cellular Biomechanics" (2004), "SL: Structural Longevity" (2008), and "ACM: Advances in Computational Mechanics" (2008), all of which are published by Tech Science Press. All these journals are in the frontier disciplines of engineering and the sciences, and especially at the interfaces of engineering and the sciences. Previously, Professor Atluri founded, and was Editor-in-Chief of the international journal, "Computational Mechanics", during 1986-2000.

The ICCES conferences are held annually: Tokyo (1986); Atlanta (1988); Melbourne, Australia (1991); Hong Kong (1992); Big Island, Hawaii (1995); San Jose, Costa Rica (1997); Atlanta (1998); Los Angeles (2000); Puerto Vallarta, Mexico (2001); Reno, Nevada (2002); Corfu, Greece (2003); Madeira, Portugal (2004); Chennai, India (2005); Miami (2007); Honolulu (2008); Phuket, Thailand (2009), Las Vegas (2010), and Nanjing, China (2011), Crete, Greece (2012), Seattle, USA (2013), Changwon, South Korea (2014), Reno (2015); Madeira, Portugal (2017), and Tokyo, Japan (2019). All these conferences bring together each year, about 500 of the world’s leading academic, industrial, and government researchers in multidisciplinary engineering, sciences, technologies, and pertinent policies. All aspects of theory, computation, and experimentation are emphasized at these conferences. It is in this spirit that the Satya N. Atluri ICCES Medal honors: 1. Either an individual for her or his multifaceted and exemplary contributions in the broadest sense, and for their impact on society, or 2. An engineering/scientific/technological achievement by a group of individuals, which by its global visibility, benefits the well-being of vast segments of people.

The recent recipients of the Satya N. Atluri Medal include:

2025: Professor Vikram Deshpande, Cambridge University, UK
2025: Professor Yonggang Huang, Northwestern University, USA
2024: Professor Huajian Gao, Tsinghua University, Beijing, China
2020: Professor Sudhir K. Jain, Director (President) of the Indian Institute of Technology, Gandhi Nagar
2019: Professor Anurag Kumar, Director (i.e., the President) of the Indian Institute of Science, Bangalore, India
2013: Chancellor John A. White, University of Arkansas, USA
2012: Chancellor Henry Yang, University of California, Santa Barbara, USA
2011: Dr. Guangjing Cao, President, Three Gorges Dam Groups, China
2010: Dr. Ratan Naval Tata, Chairman, Tata Sons, Mumbai, India
2009: Dr. Subra Suresh, Director, National Science Foundation
2008: Prof. Demosthenes Polyzos, Vice Rector, University of Patras, Greece
