= Warner T. Koiter =

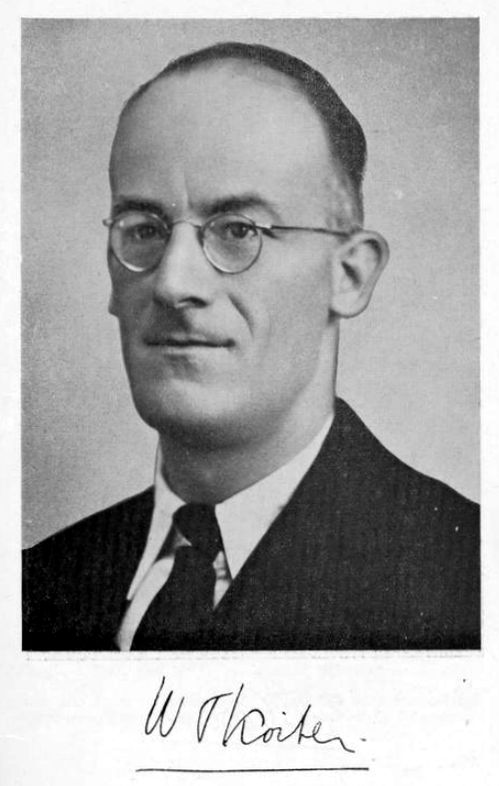
Prof. dr. ir. W. T. Koiter, 1950

Warner Tjardus Koiter (Amsterdam, June 16, 1914 – Delft, September 2, 1997) was an influential mechanical engineer and the Professor of Applied Mechanics at Delft University of Technology in the Netherlands from 1949 to 1979.

== Life and education ==
Warner Tjardus Koiter was born in Amsterdam. After primary and secondary education, he enrolled into Delft University of Technology in 1931, graduating with honours as a mechanical engineer in 1936.

After graduation, he worked at the Dutch National Aeronautical Research Institute (NLL) in Amsterdam to work on airworthiness checking of aircraft structures. In 1938, he moved to the Government Patent Office and in 1939, he joined the Government Civil Aviation Office.

During the war, he worked at NLL on subjects of his own choice. These investigations led to his PhD thesis, On the Stability of Elastic Equilibrium, which was defended in Delft, November 1945; it was supervised by C. B. Biezeno. The thesis was written in Dutch, since the occupying forces only allowed theses to be written in either German or Dutch. As a consequence, its contents became only known to the broad scientific community after an English translation was edited by NASA 15 years later. (Translation by Eduard Riks)

In 1949, he was appointed Professor of Applied Mechanics in Delft, where he stayed until his retirement in 1979.

== Achievements ==
Koiter is primarily known for his asymptotic theory of initial post-buckling stability. Other contributions are in linear and non-linear thin shell theory, plasticity, elasticity and accompanying mathematics. One of his contributions on the 'best' linear thin shell theory got the title 'All you need is Love'. He published approximately 150 reports and papers.

== Awards and honors ==
Koiter was awarded the Von Karman medal by the ASCE and the Timoshenko Medal by the ASME. He obtained honorary doctorates from Universities of Leicester, Glasgow, Bochum, and Ghent. Koiter was elected a member of the Royal Netherlands Academy of Arts and Sciences in 1959. In 1977 he was elected an international member of the National Academy of Engineering (NAE) of the United States. He was elected a Foreign Member of the Royal Society in 1982. In 1996, the American Society of Mechanical Engineers instated the Warner T. Koiter medal for achievements in solid mechanics, and awarded him the first one in 1997.
