= Satya N. Atluri =

American aerospace engineer (1945–2023)

- Born: October 7, 1945; Gudivada, Madras State, British India, (now Andhra Pradesh, India)
- Died: August 4, 2023 (aged 77)
- Citizenship: American
- Education: Andhra University; Indian Institute of Science; MIT
- Known for: Computational mechanics, meshless method, Meshless Local Petrov Galerkin (MLPG) Method, nonlinear dynamical systems, Fragile Points Method, numerical/analytical alternating method in fracture mechanics, Orbital Mechanics, Digital Twins of Aerospace Systems
- Awards: AIAA Structural Dynamics Medal (1988); AIAA Pendray Aerospace Literature Award (1998); AIAA Crichlow Trust Prize ($100,000 Global Aerospace Prize) (2015); Padma Bhushan, President of India (2013) Eringen Medal (1995) Nadai Medal (2012); Outstanding Achievement Award, U.S. National Academy of Engineering (1995); Excellence in Aviation Award (FAA) (1998); The Hilbert Medal (2003)
- Scientific career
- Fields: Aerospace engineering Mechanical engineering
- Workplaces: Texas Tech; Georgia Tech; UCLA; UCI; MIT

Satya Atluri (October 7, 1945 – August 4, 2023) was an Indian-American engineer, educator, researcher, and scientist. He served as a Distinguished Professor Emeritus of Aerospace Engineering at the University of California, Irvine.

In 1996, Atluri was elected a member of the National Academy of Engineering for his work on computational methods in fracture mechanics and aerospace structures. He was subsequently elected to the Indian National Academy of Engineering (1997), the European Academy of Sciences (2002), the World Academy of Sciences (2003), the National Academy of Sciences of Ukraine (2008, Stephen Timoshenko Institute), and the Academy of Athens (2013).

On January 25, 2013, then Indian president Pranab Mukherjee awarded him the Padma Bhushan Award, the Republic of India's third-highest civilian honor, in the category of science and technology.

His research focused on aerospace engineering, mechanical engineering, applied mechanics & mathematics, and computer modelling in engineering & sciences. He authored and/or edited 65 research monographs and more than 800 research papers.

== Education and career ==
Atluri completed his pre-university studies at Government College, Rajahmundry. He earned a bachelor’s degree in engineering from Andhra University’s College of Engineering, Kakinada, in 1964, a master’s degree from the Indian Institute of Science in 1966, and a Doctor of Science degree from the Massachusetts Institute of Technology in 1969.

He received honorary Doctor of Science degrees from the National University of Ireland (1988); the Slovak Academy of Sciences (2005); the University of Patras, Greece (2007); the University of Nova Gorica, Slovenia (2009); and the University of Montenegro, Podgorica (2020).

Atluri’s academic appointments began as a research associate at MIT (1969–1971), followed by an assistant professorship in aeronautics and astronautics at the University of Washington (1971–1973). He joined Georgia Tech in 1973 as a professor of engineering science and mechanics, becoming Regents’ Professor in 1979 and Institute Professor in 1991, and serving until 1998.

From 1991 to 1998, he directed the FAA National Center for Aircraft Structures and held the Hightower Chair in Engineering at Georgia Tech (1996–1998). He served as Jerome C. Hunsaker Professor of Aeronautics at MIT (1990–1991), Distinguished Professor of Aerospace Engineering at UCLA (1996–2002), and Theodore von Karman Chair Professor and Distinguished Professor at UC Irvine (2002–2015).

He served as Presidential Chair and University Distinguished Professor at Texas Tech University from 2015 to 2023 and has held the title Distinguished Professor Emeritus at UC Irvine since June 2023.

Atluri held honorary and visiting positions internationally, including Faculty Fellow at the Hagler Institute for Advanced Study, Texas A&M University; Distinguished Professor of Multidisciplinary Engineering and Computer Science at King Abdulaziz University; Honorary Chair Professor at National Tsing Hua University; Visiting Professor under the World-Class University Program at Pusan National University; Honorary Professorships at Tsinghua University, Lanzhou University, Southwest Jiaotong University–Emei, and the University of Patras; and Visiting Professorship at the University of Tokyo under the Japan Society for the Promotion of Science.

== Professional affiliations ==
Atluri was a fellow of the American Academy of Mechanics (1981); the American Institute of Aeronautics and Astronautics (1991); the American Society of Mechanical Engineers (1998); the Aeronautical Society of India (1990); the Chinese Society of Theoretical and Applied Mechanics (1984); the United States Association for Computational Mechanics (1995); the International Association of Computational Mechanics (1997); and an honorary fellow of the International Congress on Fracture (1993).

He was elected to membership in the U.S. National Academy of Engineering (1996), the Indian National Academy of Engineering (1997), The World Academy of Sciences (2001), the European Academy of Sciences (2002), the National Academy of Sciences of Ukraine (2008), the Academy of Athens, Greece (2013), and the Academy of Medicine, Engineering and Science of Texas (2016).

== Government and professional service ==
Atluri served on U.S. federal advisory bodies and academy committees, including as chair of the panel that recommends recipients of the National Medal of Technology and Innovation and as a member of the Federal Aviation Administration’s Research, Engineering, and Development Advisory Committee in the 1990s. He also served on National Research Council panels for the National Academies and on the Board of Visitors for the U.S. Army Research Office.

Within the National Academy of Engineering, he held committee roles that included vice chair and chair of the Aerospace Section peer review committee and membership on the Committee on Membership.

== Recognition ==
Atluri was awarded the Padma Bhushan in Science and Engineering by the President of India in 2013 for contributions to science and engineering.

In April 2014, he was inducted as a corresponding member of the Academy of Athens in Greece.

He received the Walter J. and Angeline H. Crichlow Trust Prize from the American Institute of Aeronautics and Astronautics (AIAA) in 2015; the AIAA Structures, Structural Dynamics, and Materials Medal in 1988; the AIAA Structures, Structural Dynamics, and Materials Lecture Award in 1998; and the AIAA Pendray Aerospace Literature Medal in 1998.

Atluri received the Nadai Medal from the American Society of Mechanical Engineers in 2012 and the Aerospace Structures and Materials Award from the American Society of Civil Engineers in 1986.

He received the Outstanding Achievement Award from the National Academy of Engineering in 1995; the Eringen Medal from the Society of Engineering Science in 1995, and the Computational Mechanics Medal from the Japan Society of Mechanical Engineers in 1991.

At Georgia Institute of Technology, he received the Class of 1934 Distinguished Professor Award in 1986 and the Outstanding Researcher Award in 1991 and 1993.

He was awarded a fellowship from the Japan Society for the Promotion of Science in 1998 and served as a Midwestern Mechanics Lecturer in 1989 and a Southwestern Mechanics Lecturer in 1987.

== Other activities ==
In 1986, Atluri co-founded the International Conference on Computational & Experimental Engineering & Sciences (ICCES), which convenes researchers across computational and experimental engineering and related sciences. ICCES confers several named awards and recognitions at its meetings.

Atluri has been associated with the Global Forum on Structural Longevity, an initiative focused on structural health, failure prevention, and infrastructure rehabilitation; the first meeting was held in Suzhou, China, in 2010.

He was involved in founding Tech Science Press and developing several of its journals, including Computer Modelling in Engineering & Sciences and Computers, Materials & Continua.

Atluri’s philanthropy included support for endowments at the Indian Institute of Science, notably the Revati and Satya Nadham Atluri Chair in the Division of Biological Sciences and the Revati and Satya Nadham Atluri Medal in Nanoscience and Engineering.

== Citation metrics ==
From the Science Citation Index, he is on the original list of 100 most highly cited researchers in engineering, 1980–2000, and one of the 3000 most highly cited researchers in the world in all disciplines, based on research published during 2002–2018. From the Google Scholar citation, he is also ranked as the most highly cited researcher in the world in aerospace engineering, the second most highly cited researcher in the world in fracture mechanics, the sixth most highly cited researcher in the world in mechanics, and the 12th most highly cited researcher in the world in applied mathematics. Five out of the ten most highly cited papers in the journal Computational Mechanics (Springer) from 1985 to 2014 were authored by Atluri. Six out of the ten most highly cited papers in the journal CMES: Computer Modeling in Engineering & Sciences (Tech Science Press) from 1999 to 2014 were authored by Atluri.

== Selected publications ==
- Atluri, S.N. (2005). Methods of Computer Modeling in Engineering & the Sciences. Tech Science Press. ISBN 0-9657001-9-4.
- Atluri, S.N. (2004). The Meshless Method (MLPG) for Domain & BIE Discretizations. Tech Science Press. ISBN 0-9657001-8-6.
- Atluri, S.N.; Zhu, T.L. (1998). "A New Meshless Local Petrov-Galerkin (MLPG) Approach in Computational Mechanics" (PDF). Computational Mechanics. 22 (2): 117–127. Bibcode:1998CompM..22..117A. doi:10.1007/s004660050346. S2CID 3688083. Archived from the original (PDF) on 10 June 2010.
- Atluri, Satya N. (1997). Structural Integrity and Durability. Tech Science Press, 1998. 900 pages. ISBN 0965700119.

== Selected honors and awards ==
- Revati & Satya Nadham Atluri Chair in Biological Sciences, Indian Institute of Science (2018)
- Crichlow Trust Prize, AIAA (a $100,000 Global Aerospace Prize)
- Padma Bhushan (India), 2013
- The NADAI Medal (ASME), 2012
- Excellence in Aviation Award (FAA), 1998
- The Structures, Structural Dynamics, and Materials Medal (AIAA), 1988
- The Structures, Structural Dynamics and Materials Lecture Award (AIAA), 1998
- The Pendray Aerospace Literature Medal (AIAA), 1998
- The Aerospace Structures and Materials Award (ASCE), 1986
- Hilbert Medal (ICCES), 2003
- ICCES Medal (ICCES), 1992
- Eringen Medal (Society of Engineering Science), 1995
- The Satya N. Atluri ICCES Medal, ICCES
