= List of fellows of the Royal Society elected in 1961 =

Fellows of the Royal Society elected in 1961.

== Fellows ==
1. Sir James Baddiley
2. Harold Everard Monteagle Barlow
3. Maurice Stevenson Bartlett
4. Rupert Everett Billingham
5. Sir Clifford Charles Butler
6. Joseph Chatt
7. Brian Flowers, Baron Flowers
8. Louis Harold Gray
9. Sidney Henry Haughton
10. Rodney Hill
11. Howard Everest Hinton
12. Robert George Spencer Hudson
13. Frank Kearton, Baron Kearton
14. Heinz London
15. Montague Maizels
16. Irene Manton
17. Leo Edmond Marion
18. Arnold Ashley Miles
19. Douglas Geoffrey Northcott
20. George Joseph Popjak
21. Sir John Pople
22. Sir Rutherford Ness Robertson
23. Salimuzzaman Siddiqui
24. Sir Alec Skempton
25. Michael James Denham White

== Foreign members ==
1. Olaf Holtedahl
2. Solomon Lefschetz
3. Elmer Verner McCollum
4. Aleksandr Nikolaevich Nesmeyanov
