= Mary Wheeler =

American mathematician

Mary Fanett Wheeler
- Born: December 28, 1938 (age 87); Cuero, Texas, US
- Education: University of Texas (BS, BA, MA); Rice University (PhD)
- Known for: numerical methods for PDEs, domain decomposition
- Awards: Theodore von Kármán Prize; Humboldt Prize
- Scientific career
- Fields: Numerical Analysis; Partial Differential Equations; Scientific Computation
- Workplaces: Rice University; University of Houston; University of Texas
- Thesis: A Priori L_{2} Error Estimates for Galerkin Approximations to Parabolic Partial Differential Equations (1971)
- Doctoral advisor: Henry H. Rachford, Jr. Jim Douglas, Jr.
- Doctoral students: Beatrice Rivière; Carol S. Woodward

Mary Fanett Wheeler (born December 28, 1938) is an American mathematician. She is known for her work on numerical methods for partial differential equations, including domain decomposition methods.

In 1998, Wheeler was elected a member of the National Academy of Engineering for "the computer simulation of subsurface flow and the underlying mathematical algorithms".

In 2009 she was awarded the Theodore von Kármán Prize by the Society for Industrial and Applied Mathematics (SIAM).

== Personal background ==
Mary Fanett Wheeler was born on December 28, 1938, in Cuero, Texas. She earned a double major in social sciences and mathematics from the University of Texas in 1960, and a Master's degree in 1963. She did her masters thesis on the Peaceman-Rachford method, and later went on to do her Ph.D. under Rachford at Rice University in 1971.

== Professional background ==
Wheeler studies finite element analysis and porous media problems with applications in engineering, oil-field exploitation, and the cleaning up of environmental pollution. Her early work consisted of fundamental contributions to finite element methods and numerical analysis. She then moved into porous media problems, using her numerical expertise to study problems in the oil industry such as managing oil-field extraction. She also studies environmental problems such as cleaning up underground reservoirs, spills of toxic waste, and carbon dioxide sequestration. In addition, Wheeler has worked with the United States Army Corps of Engineers on environmental impact in the Chesapeake Bay, Delaware Bay, and Florida Bay.

On the matter of pure versus applied math, Wheeler has been noted to say "To me it is important to see your work used. I do abstract things as well, and I don't know if I will live to see them applied."

Wheeler worked at the Rice University from 1971 to 1995, with a two-year hiatus at University of Houston from 1988 to 1990. In 1995 she moved to the University of Texas at Austin (UT) where she served as the director of the Center for Subsurface Modeling at the Oden Institute for Computational Engineering and Sciences. She retired from UT in 2024.

Wheeler is a Professional Engineer registered with the State of Texas since 1999. In 1989, she gave the prestigious Noether Lecture for the Association for Women in Mathematics in Phoenix, Arizona. Her talk was titled "Large Scale Modeling of Problems Arising in Flow in Porous Media".

== Awards ==
- Noether Lecture (1989)
- Theodore von Kármán Prize (2009)
- Humboldt Prize (2011)

== Memberships ==
- Fellow, Society for Industrial and Applied Mathematics
- Society of Petroleum Engineers
- Fellow, International Association for Computational Mechanics
- National Academy of Engineering
- American Academy of Arts and Sciences
