= Gerhard A. Holzapfel =

Austrian biomechanician

- Born: May 22, 1961 (age 65); Graz, Styria, Austria
- Education: Graz University of Technology (PhD)
- Known for: Constitutive and computational modeling of fiber-reinforced materials, soft biological tissues including blood vessels in health and disease
- Awards: William Prager Medal (2021); Warner T. Koiter Medal (2021)
- Scientific career
- Fields: Nonlinear Solid Mechanics, Biomechanics, Mechanobiology
- Workplaces: Graz University of Technology; Norwegian University of Science and Technology

Gerhard Alfred Holzapfel (born May 22, 1961) is an Austrian scientist and biomechanician. He is a professor of biomechanics, and has been head of the Institute of Biomechanics at Graz University of Technology, Austria, since 2007. He is the international chair of biomechanics (adjunct professorship) at the Norwegian University of Science and Technology (NTNU).

Holzapfel works in nonlinear solid mechanics, constitutive and computational modeling of fiber-reinforced materials and soft biological tissues including blood vessels in health and disease.

== Education and training ==
Gerhard A. Holzapfel received his M.S. degree in Civil Engineering and his Ph.D. in Mechanical Engineering from Graz University of Technology in 1985 and 1990, respectively. He received his Habilitation in Mechanics from the Vienna University of Technology, Austria, in 1996.

== Research ==
Holzapfel's research focuses on nonlinear continuum mechanics, constitutive and computational modeling of fiber-reinforced materials, and the biomechanics of soft biological tissues, particularly cardiovascular tissues. Together with his research group, he has combined experimental biomechanics, continuum mechanics modeling, finite element methods, and imaging techniques to study tissue structure and mechanics across scales.

== Select awards and honors ==
- 2003: Josef-Krainer Würdigungspreis
- 2011: Erwin Schrödinger Prize
- 2021: William Prager Medal
- 2021: Warner T. Koiter Medal
- 2024: Doctor Honoris Causa from the Institut Mines-Télécom, École des Mines de Saint-Étienne, France
- 2025: Honorary Degree in Mechanical Engineering from the University of Parma, Italy
- 2025: The Huiskes Medal for Biomechanics from the European Society of Biomechanics

== Books ==
- Holzapfel, Gerhard A. (2000). Nonlinear solid mechanics: a continuum approach for engineering. Chichester: Wiley. ISBN 0-471-82304-X. OCLC 43561722.
