= John W. Hutchinson =

Scholar in the field of applied mechanics

John Woodsides Hutchinson
- Born: April 10, 1939 (age 87)
- Education: Lehigh University; Harvard University
- Known for: Solid mechanics
- Awards: William Prager Medal (1991); ASME Thurston Lecture Award (2001); Timoshenko Medal (2002)
- Scientific career
- Fields: Solid mechanics
- Workplaces: Harvard University
- Doctoral advisor: Bernard Budiansky
- Doctoral students: Donald A. Danielson; Alan Needleman; Shih Choon Fong; Zhigang Suo; Yonggang Huang; Hilary Bart-Smith

John W. Hutchinson (born April 10, 1939) is the Abbott and James Lawrence Research Professor of Engineering in the School of Engineering and Applied Sciences at Harvard University. He works in the field of solid mechanics concerned with a broad range of problems in structures and engineering materials.

Hutchinson was elected a member of the National Academy of Engineering in 1983 for the fundamental contributions to the understanding of the elastic and plastic buckling of structures and the mechanical behavior and fracture of engineering materials.

== Early life and education ==
John Hutchinson was born in Hartford, Connecticut, in 1939, the eldest child of John W. Hutchinson and Evelyn Eastburn Hutchinson. A month or so after he was born, the family moved to Bridgeton, New Jersey, where Hutchinson's father, a newly ordained Presbyterian minister, assumed the pastorship of the First Presbyterian Church. Hutchinson grew up in Bridgeton and attended the local high school. He matriculated at Lehigh University for his undergraduate studies eventually electing to major in the newly created Department of Engineering Mechanics. He attended Lehigh during the period 1956 to 1960 when space achievements, particularly those of the Soviet Union, had considerable influence on aspiring young engineers. He was further motivated in this direction in the summer of 1959 by a summer job at Boeing in Seattle. Hutchinson decided to pursue graduate work in mechanical engineering at Harvard University where he conducted his Ph.D. research under Bernard Budiansky, an expert in solid mechanics and structures who had come to Harvard from NACA (the predecessor to NASA). Hutchinson's thesis was on the theory of polycrystalline plasticity, an early effort to characterize the nonlinear plastic behavior of structural metals at the engineering scale based on the microscopic behavior of the single crystal grains comprising the polycrystal.

== Academic career ==
After finishing his thesis in the spring of 1963, Hutchinson spent a six-month post-doctoral period at the Technical University of Denmark in Copenhagen hosted by Frithof Niordson, the head of the solid mechanics department. The connection with Denmark would prove to be an enduring one. While in Denmark, he was invited to return to Harvard to join the faculty as an assistant professor. This would also prove to be an enduring connection. He worked his way through the ranks at Harvard and served on the faculty for fifty years and continues at the university as a Research Professor (emeritus status). He also holds the position of adjunct professor at the Technical University of Denmark and a Visiting Professorship at the University of California at Santa Barbara.

When Hutchinson assumed his faculty position at Harvard in 1964, he was greatly influenced by a number of remarkable senior colleagues. In addition to Budiansky, there were George Carrier (fluids and applied mathematics), Bruce Chalmers (metallurgy) and Lyell Sanders (solids), to name just a few. The 1960s saw significant growth in engineering and applied science in American universities, and Harvard, given its head start as the country's oldest university and its strong tradition for research, was an exciting place for a young faculty member. When hired as an assistant professor, Hutchinson was told forthrightly by his Dean that there would be no possibility of a tenure slot opening up and he should view his position as a temporary five-year job. As a reflection of the optimism of those times, this prognosis hardly mattered because a young faculty member could realistically assume plenty of jobs would be available elsewhere when the time came to move on. In any case, the Dean was wrong, a tenure slot did open up, and in 1969 Hutchinson became the Gordon McKay Professor of Applied Mechanics and for a period of time the youngest professor in the Faculty of Arts and Sciences.

After his thesis work, Hutchinson collaborated extensively for several years with Budiansky on the buckling of shell structures. As the basic structures used in aerospace applications, shells are an engineering challenge because for some critically important configurations even a carefully manufactured shell may buckle catastrophically at a load which is a small fraction of what is predicted theoretically for a “perfect” version. All real shells have some level of imperfection. The work of Budiansky and Hutchinson characterized and quantified the buckling imperfection-sensitivity of important shell structures. In doing so, they made heavy use of the fundamental work on elastic stability of Warner Koiter of the Technical University of Delft in Holland, whose work at the time was only available in his Ph.D. thesis published in Dutch. Hutchinson's interactions with Koiter were the beginning of much productive and enjoyable collaboration with foreign colleagues as well as those in America.

== Research ==
The 1960s was a period in which researchers in mechanics and materials science greatly increased their interactions. Solid mechanics became increasingly focused on problems arising in materials. On the mechanics side, Budiansky at Harvard and Frank McClintock at MIT were pioneers in this shift in emphasis and both contributed to Hutchinson's interest in what became known as the micro-mechanics of materials. In the late 1960s and well into the 1980s Hutchinson worked on the fracture mechanics of materials and, in particular, on the development of nonlinear fracture mechanics applicable to cracking of tough structural metal alloys. The linear fracture mechanics existing at the time was not applicable when extensive plastic deformation occurred prior to cracking, which is typically the case for many engineering alloys. One paper published in 1968, characterized the stress and strains near the tip of a crack in materials undergoing plastic deformation. In the same journal issue a similar crack analysis was published by Rice and Rosengren. The HRR crack tip fields, as they came to be known, provide a theoretical underpinning of nonlinear fracture mechanics. James Rice, who was at Brown University at that time, would join the faculty at Harvard in 1981 and become Hutchinson's close colleague.

In the late 1970s while serving on the Materials Research Council (later called the Defense Science Research Council) sponsored by DARPA, Hutchinson began a collaboration with the materials scientist and engineer A.G. (Tony) Evans which lasted over thirty years until Evans' death in 2009. Evans was an excellent judge of technological problems with an unmatched flair for forming teams of engineers, chemists, physicists and materials scientists to tackle challenging problems. Hutchinson's skills in mechanics modeling and analysis complemented Evans' broad knowledge of materials and their behavior. Together they contributed to the engineering science of many technological areas, including toughening mechanisms in ceramics, ceramic matrix composite materials for high temperature applications, thin film mechanics, the mechanics of interface failure for bonded materials, and the delamination and spalling of ceramic thermal barrier coatings used in aircraft engines and power generating turbines. In all, the two co-authored 74 papers together.

In the 1990s, and thereafter, Hutchinson's continued research on a wide variety of applied problems. Moreover, he never fully abandoned subjects he had earlier pursued thereby gradually accumulating a fairly large array of research interests and technical expertise. New areas included a major effort to develop a comprehensive mechanics of the fracture and delamination of layered materials, such as thin films and coatings and the multilayers used in electronics and optics, and the extension of the classical plasticity theory of metals to small scales where strong effects related to size become dominant. Most recently Hutchinson has focused his attention on the stability of deformation of soft materials such as elastomers and gels, which have emerged as being of major interest, especially because of potential bio-medical applications.

== Perspective ==
It is fair to say that Hutchinson has been fortunate in many respects, not only in having the privilege to work in an environment which provides strong support to research with stellar colleagues and students, but also to have ripened as an engineering scientist at a time when the nation was heavily investing in engineering and applied science. He has been the thesis adviser to 36 Ph.D. students. A telling statistic, which is not as unusual as it might sound for an active researcher these days, at least one who has been working for over fifty years, is that Hutchinson has published almost 350 technical papers and the number of different co-authors (i.e., distinct individuals) is nearly 200. Of these co-authors about 65% were in America, at least at the time the work was conducted, and 35% worked in other countries. Approximately 25% of his co-authors were Harvard students, post-docs or faculty. A further statistic which might interest younger colleagues contending with today's academic pressures is that in the first decade after publishing his first paper, Hutchinson published an average of only 2.3 papers/year, in the second decade 3.8 papers/year, in the third decade 5.6 papers/year, in the fourth decade 9.5 papers/year, and in the fifth decade 6.6 papers/year.

== Awards and honors ==
Hutchinson has been recognized throughout his career with the highest honors of his field and across science. From the American Society of Mechanical Engineers, he has received the Robert Henry Thurston Lecture Award in 2001, the Timoshenko Medal of the American Society of Mechanical Engineers awarded in 2002. In 2015 the science society, Sigma Xi, awarded Hutchinson the Ferst Award in recognition of his contributions to mentoring students. Many of his former Ph.D. students were present at a festive ceremony at Georgia Tech. Hutchinson was elected to the American Academy of Arts and Sciences in 1976, the U.S. National Academy of Engineering in 1983 and the National Academy of Sciences in 1990. In 2013 he was elected as a foreign member to the Royal Society of London. He has been awarded honorary doctoral degrees by the Royal Institute of Technology, Stockholm (1985), The Technical University of Denmark (1992), Northwestern University (2002), Lehigh University (2004) and The University of Illinois (2005).

Hutchinson was awarded the Ludwig-Prandtl-Ring from the Deutsche Gesellschaft für Luft- und Raumfahrt (German Society for Aeronautics and Astronautics) for "outstanding contribution in the field of aerospace engineering" in 2012.
