= Olvi L. Mangasarian =

Iraqi-born American mathematician (1934–2020)

- Born: January 12, 1934; Baghdad, Iraq
- Died: 15 March 2020 (aged 86); Madison, Wisconsin
- Education: Harvard University
- Scientific career
- Fields: Mathematics
- Workplaces: University of Wisconsin–Madison
- Doctoral advisor: Bernard Budiansky

Olvi Leon Mangasarian (12 January 1934 – 15 March 2020) was the John von Neumann Professor Emeritus of Mathematics and Computer Sciences in Department of Mathematics, University of California, San Diego and Professor Emeritus of Computer Sciences at the University of Wisconsin-Madison and a recognised expert on optimization, data mining, and classification. In 2000, while professor in the Computer Science Department of the University of Wisconsin–Madison, he was awarded the Frederick W. Lanchester Prize for pioneering work in introducing the use of Operations Research techniques to the field of data mining with a particularly notable application being to breast cancer diagnosis.

== Selected publications ==
- Mangasarian, O. L. (1993). Nonlinear programming (Vol. 10). SIAM.

== Festschrift ==
- Pang, J. S. (1999). Computational Optimization: A Tribute to Olvi Mangasarian, Volumes I and II. Kluwer Acad. Publ.
