= Paul Garabedian =

American mathematician (1927–2010)

Paul R. Garabedian
- Paul Garabedian
- Born: August 2, 1927; Cincinnati, Ohio
- Died: May 13, 2010 (aged 82); Manhattan, New York
- Education: Brown University; Harvard University
- Scientific career
- Fields: Mathematics
- Workplaces: Courant Institute of Mathematical Sciences
- Thesis: Schwarz's lemma and the Szegő kernel functions (1948)
- Doctoral advisor: Lars Ahlfors

Paul Roesel Garabedian (August 2, 1927 – May 13, 2010) was a mathematician and numerical analyst. Garabedian was the Director-Division of Computational Fluid Dynamics at the Courant Institute of Mathematical Sciences, New York University. He is known for his contributions to the fields of computational fluid dynamics and plasma physics, which ranged from elegant existence proofs for potential theory and conformal mappings to the design and optimization of stellarators. Garabedian was elected a member of the National Academy of Sciences in 1975.

== Education and career ==
Born in Cincinnati, Ohio, Garabedian received a bachelor's degree from Brown University in 1946 and a master's degree from the Harvard University in 1947, both in mathematics. He received his Ph.D., also from Harvard University, in 1948 under the direction of Lars Ahlfors. It was at Brown University that he met his longtime colleague and collaborator, Frances Bauer.

In 1949 Garabedian joined the faculty at the University of California as an Assistant Professor and became associate professor in 1952. In 1956, he moved to Stanford University as a professor of mathematics. In 1959 he moved to the Institute of Mathematical Sciences [later renamed the Courant Institute] at New York University. In 1978 he was appointed the Director-Division of Computational Fluid Dynamics at the Courant Institute of Mathematical Sciences, New York University. In a long and fruitful academic career, Garabedian supervised 27 Ph.D. theses. The first was in 1953 (Edward McLeod) and the last came in 1997 (Connie Chen).

== Honors and awards ==
- Sloan Fellowship, 1961–63
- Guggenheim Fellowship, 1966
- Fairchild Distinguished Scholar Caltech, 1975
- NASA Public Service Group Achievement Award by NASA Langley Research Center, 1976
- Boris Pregel Award, New York Academy of Sciences, 1980
- Birkhoff Prize of the AMS and SIAM, 1983
- Theodore von Kármán Prize, SIAM, 1989

== Books ==
- Partial Differential Equations, 2nd ed., Chelsea Pub. Co. (1998). ISBN 0-8218-1377-3
- Magnetohydrodynamic Equilibrium and Stability of Stellarators, with F. Bauer and O. Betancourt. Springer-Verlag (1984). ISBN 0-387-90966-4
- Supercritical Wing Sections II, with F. Bauer, D. Korn and A. Jameson. Lecture Notes in Economics and Mathematical Systems, Springer-Verlag (1975), ISBN 0-387-07029-X.
