= Polyconvex function =

In the calculus of variations, the notion of polyconvexity is a generalization of the notion of convexity for functions defined on spaces of matrices. The notion of polyconvexity was introduced by John M. Ball as a sufficient conditions for proving the existence of energy minimizers in nonlinear elasticity theory. It is satisfied by a large class of hyperelastic stored energy densities, such as Mooney-Rivlin and Ogden materials. The notion of polyconvexity is related to the notions of convexity, quasiconvexity and rank-one convexity through the following diagram:

$$f\text{ convex}\implies f\text{ polyconvex}\implies f\text{ quasiconvex}\implies f\text{ rank-one convex}$$

== Motivation ==
Let $\Omega\subset\mathbb{R}^n$ be an open bounded domain, $u:\Omega\rightarrow\mathbb{R}^m$ and $W^{1,p}(\Omega,\mathbb{R}^m)$ denote the Sobolev space of mappings from $\Omega$ to $\mathbb{R}^m$. A typical problem in the calculus of variations is to minimize a functional, $E:W^{1,p}(\Omega,\mathbb{R}^m)\rightarrow\mathbb{R}$ of the form

$$E[u]=\int_\Omega f(x,\nabla u(x))dx$$,

where the energy density function, $f:\Omega\times\mathbb{R}^{m\times n}\rightarrow[0,\infty)$ satisfies $p$-growth, i.e., $|f(x,A)|\leq M(1+|A|^p)$ for some $M>0$ and $p\in(1,\infty)$. It is well-known from a theorem of Morrey and Acerbi-Fusco that a necessary and sufficient condition for $E$ to be weakly lower-semicontinuous on $W^{1,p}(\Omega,\mathbb{R}^m)$ is that $f(x,\cdot)$ is quasiconvex for almost every $x\in\Omega$. With coercivity assumptions on $f$ and boundary conditions on $u$, this leads to the existence of minimizers for $E$ on $W^{1,p}(\Omega,\mathbb{R}^m)$. However, in many applications, the assumption of $p$-growth on the energy density is often too restrictive. In the context of elasticity, this is because the energy is required to grow unboundedly to $+\infty$ as local measures of volume approach zero. This led Ball to define the more restrictive notion of polyconvexity to prove the existence of energy minimizers in nonlinear elasticity.

== Definition ==
A function $f:\mathbb{R}^{m\times n}\rightarrow\mathbb{R}$ is said to be polyconvex if there exists a convex function $\Phi:\mathbb{R}^{\tau(m,n)}\rightarrow\mathbb{R}$ such that

$$f(F)=\Phi(T(F))$$

where $T:\mathbb{R}^{m\times n}\rightarrow\mathbb{R}^{\tau(m,n)}$ is such that

$$T(F):=(F,\text{adj}_2(F),...,\text{adj}_{m\wedge n}(F)).$$

Here, $\text{adj}_s$ stands for the matrix of all $s\times s$ minors of the matrix $F\in\mathbb{R}^{m\times n}$, $2\leq s\leq m\wedge n:=\min(m,n)$ and

$$\tau(m,n):=\sum_{s=1}^{m\wedge n}\sigma(s),$$

where $\sigma(s):=\binom{m}{s}\binom{n}{s}$.

When $m=n=2$, $T(F)=(F,\det F)$ and when $m=n=3$, $T(F)=(F,\text{cof}\,F,\det F)$, where $\text{cof}\,F$ denotes the cofactor matrix of $F$.

In the above definitions, the range of $f$ can also be extended to $\mathbb{R}\cup\{+\infty\}$.

== Properties ==
- If $f$ takes only finite values, then polyconvexity implies quasiconvexity and thus leads to the weak lower semicontinuity of the corresponding integral functional on a Sobolev space.
- If $m=1$ or $n=1$, then polyconvexity reduces to convexity.
- If $f$ is polyconvex, then it is locally Lipschitz.
- Polyconvex functions with subquadratic growth must be convex, i.e., if there exists $\alpha\geq 0$ and $0\leq p<2$ such that

$f(F)\leq\alpha (1+|F|^p)$ for every $F\in \mathbb{R}^{m\times n}$, then $f$ is convex.

== Examples ==
- Every convex function is polyconvex.
- For the case $m=n$, the determinant function is polyconvex, but not convex. In particular, the following type of function that commonly appears in nonlinear elasticity is polyconvex but not convex:

$$f(A) = \begin{cases} \frac1{\det (A)}, & \det (A) > 0; \\ + \infty, & \det (A) \leq 0; \end{cases}$$
