= Beatrice Rivière =

French applied mathematician

Beatrice Marie Riviere is a computational and applied mathematician. She is the Noah Harding Chair and Professor in the department of computational and applied mathematics at Rice University. Her research involves developing efficient numerical methods for modeling fluids flowing through porous media.

== Education and career ==
Rivière earned a diploma in engineering from École Centrale Paris in 1995, and a master's degree in 1996 from the Pennsylvania State University. She moved to the University of Texas at Austin for her doctoral studies, completing her Ph.D. there in 2000. Her dissertation, Discontinuous Galerkin Methods for Solving the Miscible Displacement Problem in Porous Media, was supervised by Mary Wheeler.

Before joining the Rice University faculty in 2008, she worked as an associate professor of mathematics at the University of Pittsburgh. She was department chair from 2015 to 2018.

In 2018 she was elected chair of the Activity Group on Geosciences (SIAG/GS) of the Society for Industrial and Applied Mathematics (SIAM).

== Book ==
Rivière is the author of the book Discontinuous Galerkin methods for solving elliptic and parabolic equations: theory and implementation (SIAM, 2008).

== Recognition ==
Rivière was named a SIAM Fellow in the 2021 class of fellows, "for contributions in numerical analysis, scientific computing, and modeling of porous media". In 2021 she was elected to SIAM's board of trustees for a term running January 1, 2022 - December 31, 2024. In 2022 she will become a fellow of the Association for Women in Mathematics, "For her important contributions to numerical analysis, scientific computing and modeling of porous media; for her exemplary mentorship and supervision of women in applied and computational mathematics; and for her distinguished record of service and outreach."
