= Carol S. Woodward =

American mathematician

- Education: Louisiana State University, Rice University
- Scientific career
- Fields: Computational mathematics
- Workplaces: Lawrence Livermore National Laboratory
- Thesis: Mixed Finite Element Methods for Variably Saturated Flow
- Academic advisors: Clint Dawson, Mary Wheeler

Carol San Soucie Woodward is an American computational mathematician who works in the Center for Applied Scientific Computing at Lawrence Livermore National Laboratory. She was elected as a fellow of the Society for Industrial and Applied Mathematics (SIAM) in 2017, "for the development and application of numerical algorithms and software for large-scale simulations of complex physical phenomena".

Carol Ann San Soucie did her undergraduate studies at Louisiana State University (LSU), earning a bachelor's degree in mathematics. Her undergraduate honors thesis at LSU was supervised by Guillermo Ferreyra. She did her graduate studies at Rice University, with Clint Dawson and Mary Wheeler as her doctoral advisor. When Wheeler moved from Rice to the University of Texas at Austin in 1995, San Soucie moved with her, but she earned her doctorate from Rice in 1996, with a dissertation on Mixed Finite Element Methods for Variably Saturated Flow. She joined LLNL in the same year. At LLNL, she is in charge of the SUNDIALS project, a package of time integration and nonlinear equation solving software for use in simulations.

Woodward has been an active member of the Association for Women in Mathematics (AWM). She was elected to the executive committee of AWM and served on that committee from 2016 to 2020. In addition, she chaired the AWM Awards Committee from 2016 to 2018. Woodward was selected as a Fellow of the Association for Women in Mathematics in the Class of 2021 "for her sustained commitment to supporting and promoting women in the mathematical sciences through the AWM, including her leadership of the AWM Awards Committee, and through her work with the Society for Industrial and Applied Mathematics, and the Joint Committee on Women in the Mathematical Sciences".
