= Stuart S. Antman =

American mathematician

Stuart Sheldon Antman is an American mathematician. He is Distinguished University Research Professor at the University of Maryland. His research involves continuum mechanics, elasticity, and nonlinear partial differential equations.

Antman did his undergraduate studies at the Rensselaer Polytechnic Institute, graduating in 1961. He earned a Ph.D. in 1965 from the University of Minnesota, under the supervision of William H. Warner. He joined the New York University faculty in 1967, and moved to Maryland in 1972. He became Distinguished University Professor at Maryland in 2001, and Distinguished University Research Professor in 2014.

Antman became a fellow of the Society for Industrial and Applied Mathematics in 2009, and a fellow of the American Mathematical Society in 2012. He was awarded a Guggenheim Fellowship in 1978, and with John M. Ball he won the Theodore von Kármán Prize in 1999. In 1987 Antman won a Lester R. Ford Award. and in 2015 the Lyapunov Award from the American Society of Mechanical Engineers.

Antman is the author of the book Nonlinear Problems of Elasticity (Springer, 1995; 2nd ed., 2005).
