= A. P. Huggins =

American soldier & politician (1839–1916)

Allen Pardee Huggins (1839–1916) was a Union Army soldier, Freedmen’s Bureau official, sheriff, county school superintendent, tax official, and state legislator in Mississippi.

He was born in Ohio and grew up in Niles, Michigan. Described as a “carpetbagger” who sympathized with African Americans, he served as Monroe County’s superintendent of education. He worked to establish public schools for African Americans.

He was attacked by Ku Klux Klan members who demanded he leave Monroe County. Huggins refused and "was taken a quarter of a mile down the road and given 75 lashes with a stout leather stirrup strap. He testified about Ku Klux Klan activities. Benjamin Butler reportedly waved his bloody shirt while speaking in the U.S. Congress. After Klan members arrested for harassing and intimidating a teacher were bonded they were given an ovation upon their return to Aberdeen. Huggins explained that they were men of society, culture, and standing in the community who had by their own account whipped a Yankee and killed a “few niggers”.

During the American Civil War he commanded troops in Aberdeen, Mississippi.

He attended an 1874 convention in Chattanooga as a representative from Mississippi.

The waving of his bloodied shirt became emblematic of the dismissal by many Southern whites of violence against Blacks and their allies. It is referred to in the title of a book by Stephen Budiansky about violence after the American Civil War during the Reconstruction era. He served as a revenue agent for the U.S. government.
