= Richard D. James (scientist) =

American materials scientist (born 1952)

- Education: Johns Hopkins University (PhD); Brown University (BcS Engineering)
- Scientific career
- Fields: Phase transitions Mechanics; Materials Science; Applied Mathematics
- Workplaces: University of Minnesota; Brown University
- Doctoral advisor: J.L. Ericksen

Richard D. James (born 1952) is a mechanician and materials scientist. He is currently the Russell J. Penrose Professor and Distinguished McKnight University Professor at the Department of Aerospace Engineering and Mechanics at the University of Minnesota.

James is known for his research in phase transitions, especially reversible transformation in martensitic materials, including cases in which the phase transition is highly reversible and one phase is strongly magnetic or strongly ferroelectric.

== Education and career ==
James was educated at Brown University in 1974 and received his PhD from Johns Hopkins University in 1979 under the direction of J.L. Ericksen. He was a professor of engineering at Brown University before moving to the University of Minnesota in 1985.

== Awards and honors ==
James has received several awards, including the Theodore von Kármán Prize in 2014, Alexander von Humboldt Senior Research Award in 2006, the William Prager Medal in 2008, and the Brown Engineering Alumni Medal in 2009. The ASME awarded him the Warner T. Koiter Medal in 2008 for "pioneering the modern vision of phase transformations and materials instabilities in solids, explaining how microstructures form and evolve, and demonstrating how to take advantage of this to design new active materials".

With John M. Ball, he has served as one of the chief editors of the Archive for Rational Mechanics and Analysis.
