= Theodore von Kármán Prize =

Prize in applied mathematics

The Theodore von Kármán Prize in applied mathematics is awarded every five years to an individual who has made a significant contribution to the application of mathematics in mechanics and/or engineering sciences. Established and funded in 1968 by the Society for Industrial and Applied Mathematics (SIAM), the prize honors the legacy of Theodore von Kármán.

== List of recipients ==
- 1972 Geoffrey Ingram Taylor
- 1979 George F. Carrier and Joseph B. Keller
- 1984 Julian D. Cole
- 1989 Paul R. Garabedian
- 1994 Herbert B. Keller
- 1999 Stuart S. Antman, John M. Ball
- 2004 Roland Glowinski
- 2009 Mary F. Wheeler
- 2014 Weinan E and Richard D. James
- 2020 Kaushik Bhattacharya
- 2024 Karen Willcox

== See also ==
- List of mathematics awards
