= Rodney Hill =

British mathematician (1921–2011)

- Born: 11 June 1921
- Died: 2 February 2011 (aged 89)
- Awards: FRS
- Scientific career
- Fields: Plasticity
- Institutions: University of Cambridge

Rodney Hill FRS (11 June 1921 – 2 February 2011) was an applied mathematician and a former Professor of Mechanics of Solids at Gonville and Caius College, Cambridge.

== Career ==
In 1953 he was appointed Professor of Applied Mathematics at the University of Nottingham. His 1950 The Mathematical Theory of Plasticity work forms the foundation of plasticity theory. Hill is widely regarded as among the foremost contributors to the foundations of solid mechanics over the second half of the 20th century. His early work was central to founding the mathematical theory of plasticity. This deep interest led eventually to general studies of uniqueness and stability in nonlinear continuum mechanics, work which has had a profound influence on the field of solid mechanics—theoretical, computational and experimental alike—over the past decades. Hill was the founding editor of the Journal of the Mechanics and Physics of Solids, still among the principal journals in the field.

== Recognition ==
Hill's work is recognized worldwide for its concise style of presentation and exemplary standards of scholarship. Publisher Elsevier, in collaboration with IUTAM, established a quadrennial award in the field of solid mechanics, known as the Rodney Hill Prize, first presented at ICTAM in Adelaide in August 2008. The prize consists of a plaque and a cheque for US$25,000. Its first recipient is Michael Ortiz, for his contribution to nonconvex plasticity and deformation microstructures (California Institute of Technology, USA).

Hill won the Royal Medal in 1993 for his contribution to the theoretical mechanics of soil and the plasticity of solids. He was elected a Fellow of the Royal Society (FRS) in 1961. He was awarded an Honorary Degree (Doctor of Science) by the University of Bath in 1978.

== Death ==
He died on 2 February 2011.
