= Koiter Medal =

The Warner T. Koiter Medal was established in 1996 by the American Society of Mechanical Engineers. It is awarded in recognition of distinguished work in the field of solid mechanics.

The award was funded by the Technical University of Delft in the honor of Warner T. Koiter, who was a professor at the university from 1949 till 1979. Koiter's most influential work dealt with the non-linear stability of structures.

The recipient is given an honorarium and a bronze medal.

== Nomination procedure ==
The Koiter Medal Committee consists of the five recent Koiter Medalists, the five members of the executive committee of the ASME International Applied Mechanics Division (AMD), and the five recent past chairs of the AMD. Upon receiving recommendations from the international community of applied mechanics, the Committee nominates a single medalist every year. This nomination is subsequently approved by the ASME Committee on Honors.

== Koiter Medal recipients ==
- 2024 – H. Jerry Qi
- 2023 – Yiu-Wing Mai
- 2022 – Vikram Deshpande
- 2021 – Gerhard A. Holzapfel, Graz University of Technology, Austria
- 2020 – Anthony Waas, University of Michigan
- 2019 – K. T. Ramesh, Johns Hopkins University
- 2018 – M. Taher A. Saif, University of Illinois
- 2017 – Wei Yang, Zhejiang University
- 2016 – Pedro Ponte Castañeda, University of Pennsylvania
- 2015 – Kaushik Bhattacharya, California Institute of Technology
- 2014 – G. Ravichandran, California Institute of Technology
- 2013 – Norman A. Fleck, Cambridge University
- 2012 – Erik van der Giessen, Rijksuniversiteit Groningen
- 2011 – James G. Simmonds
- 2010 – Nicolas Triantafyllidis
- 2009 – Stelios Kyriakides
- 2008 – Richard. D. James, University of Minnesota
- 2007 – Chin-Teh Sun
- 2006 – Pierre Suquet
- 2005 – Raymond W. Ogden
- 2004 – Zenon Mróz, Polish Academy of Sciences
- 2003 – David R. J. Owen
- 2002 – James K. Knowles, California Institute of Technology
- 2001 – Wolfgang G. Knauss, California Institute of Technology
- 2000 – Giulio Maier
- 1999 – Charles R. Steele
- 1998 – Viggo Tvergaard
- 1997 – Warner T. Koiter

== See also ==
- American Society of Mechanical Engineers – Mechanical engineering professional society
- Applied mechanics – Practical application of mechanics
- Applied Mechanics Division
- List of mechanical engineering awards
- Mechanician
