= John M. Ball =

British mathematician

Professor Sir John Ball FRS FRSE
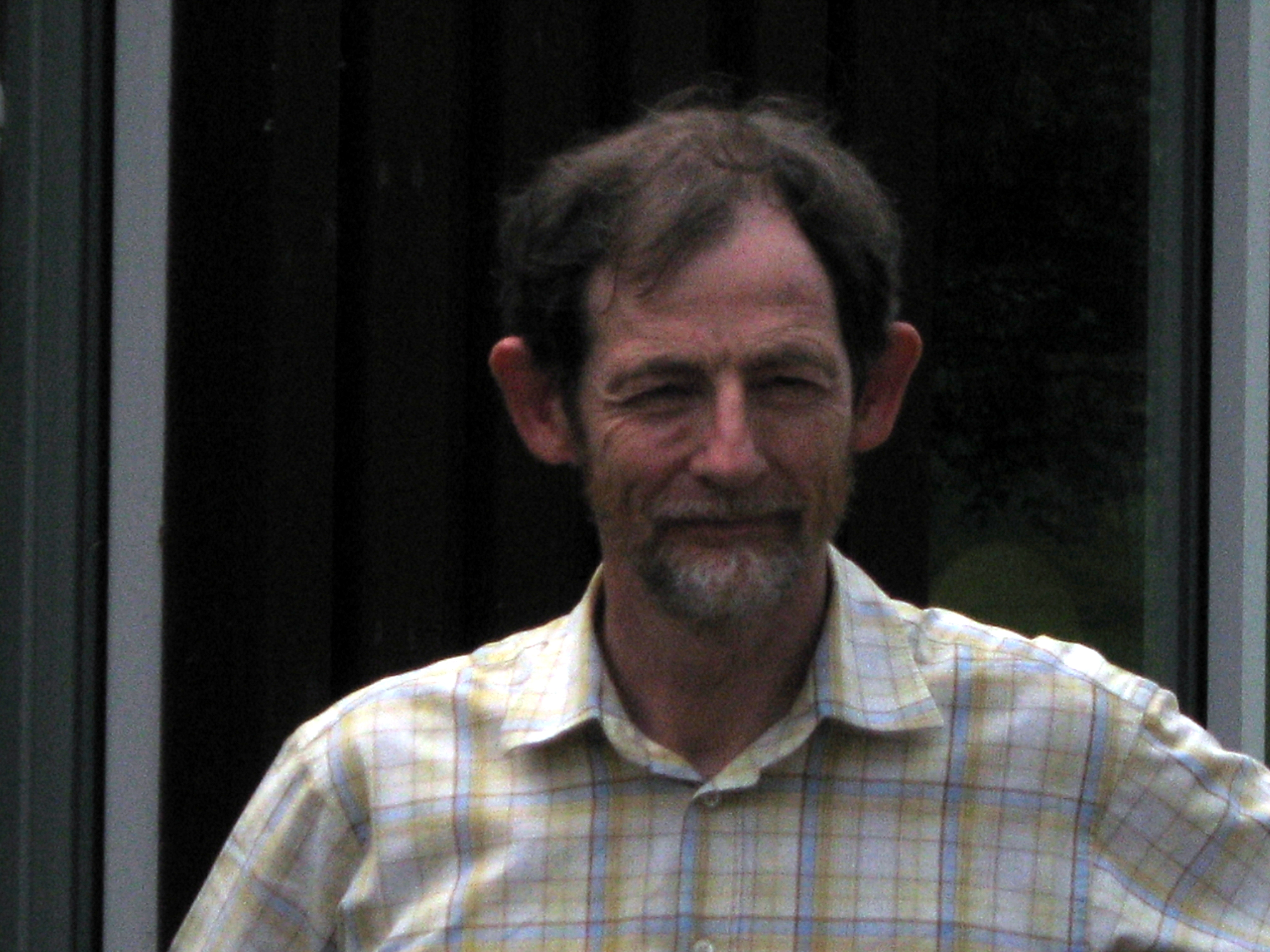
- Sir John Macleod Ball
- Born: 19 May 1948 (age 78); Farnham, Surrey, England, UK
- Education: University of Cambridge; University of Sussex
- Awards: Whittaker Prize (1981); Junior Whitehead Prize (1982); David Crighton Medal (2003); Sylvester Medal (2009); King Faisal International Prize (2018)
- Scientific career
- Workplaces: Heriot-Watt University; University of Oxford; University of Edinburgh
- Doctoral advisor: David Eric Edmunds

Sir John Macleod Ball (born 19 May 1948) is a British mathematician and former Sedleian Professor of Natural Philosophy at the University of Oxford. He was the president of the International Mathematical Union from 2003 to 2006 and a Fellow of Queen's College, Oxford.

Ball was educated at St. John's College, Cambridge and Sussex University, and prior to taking up his Oxford post was a professor of mathematics at Heriot-Watt University in Edinburgh.

Ball's research interests include elasticity, the calculus of variations, and infinite-dimensional dynamical systems. He was knighted in the New Year Honours list for 2006 "for services to Science". He is a member of the Norwegian Academy of Science and Letters and a fellow of the American Mathematical Society.

He was a member of the first Abel Prize Committee in 2002 and for the Fields Medal Committee in 1998. From 1996 to 1998 he was president of the London Mathematical Society, and from 2003 to 2006 he was president of the International Mathematical Union, IMU. In October 2011, he was elected on the executive board of ICSU for a three-year period starting January 2012. Ball is listed as an ISI highly cited researcher.

Along with Stuart S. Antman he won the Theodore von Kármán Prize in 1999. In 2018, he received the King Faisal International Prize in Mathematics.

Ball received an Honorary Doctorate from Heriot-Watt University in 1998.

He was elected a Fellow of The Royal Society of Edinburgh in 1980. He also holds a visiting position at the University of Edinburgh.

== Personal life ==
He is married to Lady Sedhar Chozam-Ball, actress, and has three children.

== See also ==
- Polyconvex function
