= Science Robotics =

American academic journal

- Journal's cover for August 21, 2019
- Discipline: Robotics, Artificial intelligence, Computer science, Mechanical engineering
- Language: English
- Edited by: Holden Thorp

Publication details
- History: 2016–present
- Publisher: AAAS
- Frequency: Monthly
- Impact factor: 25.0 (2022)

Standard abbreviations
- ISO 4: Sci. Robot.

Indexing
- ISSN: 2470-9476
- LCCN: 2016201475
- OCLC no.: 971988960

Links
- Journal homepage

Science Robotics is a peer-reviewed scientific journal published by the American Association for the Advancement of Science. The editor-in-chief is Holden Thorp of AAAS. Subjects covered are Artificial intelligence, Mathematics, Computer science, Mechanical Engineering, macro, micro and nano robots, advanced materials, and biologically influenced designs. Its scope includes theoretical research and real world applications. The 2022 impact factor is 25.0.

== Abstracting and indexing ==
- Science Citation Index
- Current Contents - Engineering, Computing & Technology
- Scopus
- MEDLINE
- Index Medicus
