= Fast fracture =

In structural engineering and material science, fast fracture is a phenomenon in which a flaw (such as a crack) in a material expands quickly, and leads to catastrophic failure of the material. It proceeds in high speed and requires a relatively small amount of accumulated strain energy, making it a dangerous failure mode.

== Flaw ==
Stress acting on a material when fast fracture occurs is less than the material's yield stress. A very representative example of this is what happens when poking a blown up balloon with a needle, that is, fast fracture of the balloon's material. The energy in the balloon comes from the compressed gas inside it and the energy stored in the rubber membrane itself. The introduction of the flaw, which in this case is the pin prick, would lead to the explosion as the membrane fails by fast fracture. However, if the same flaw is introduced to a balloon with less energy - as in the case of a partially inflated balloon - the fast fracture will not occur, unless the balloon is punctured progressively so that it reaches a critical pressure at which fast fracture occurs.

The occurrence of fast fracture can depend on the material. For instance, it transpires in the cases of brittle materials with less capacity for deformation even if the flaw only involves small defects caused by the manufacturing process.

== See also ==
- Yield (engineering)
