= Stephen Budiansky =

American writer, historian, and biographer (born 1957)

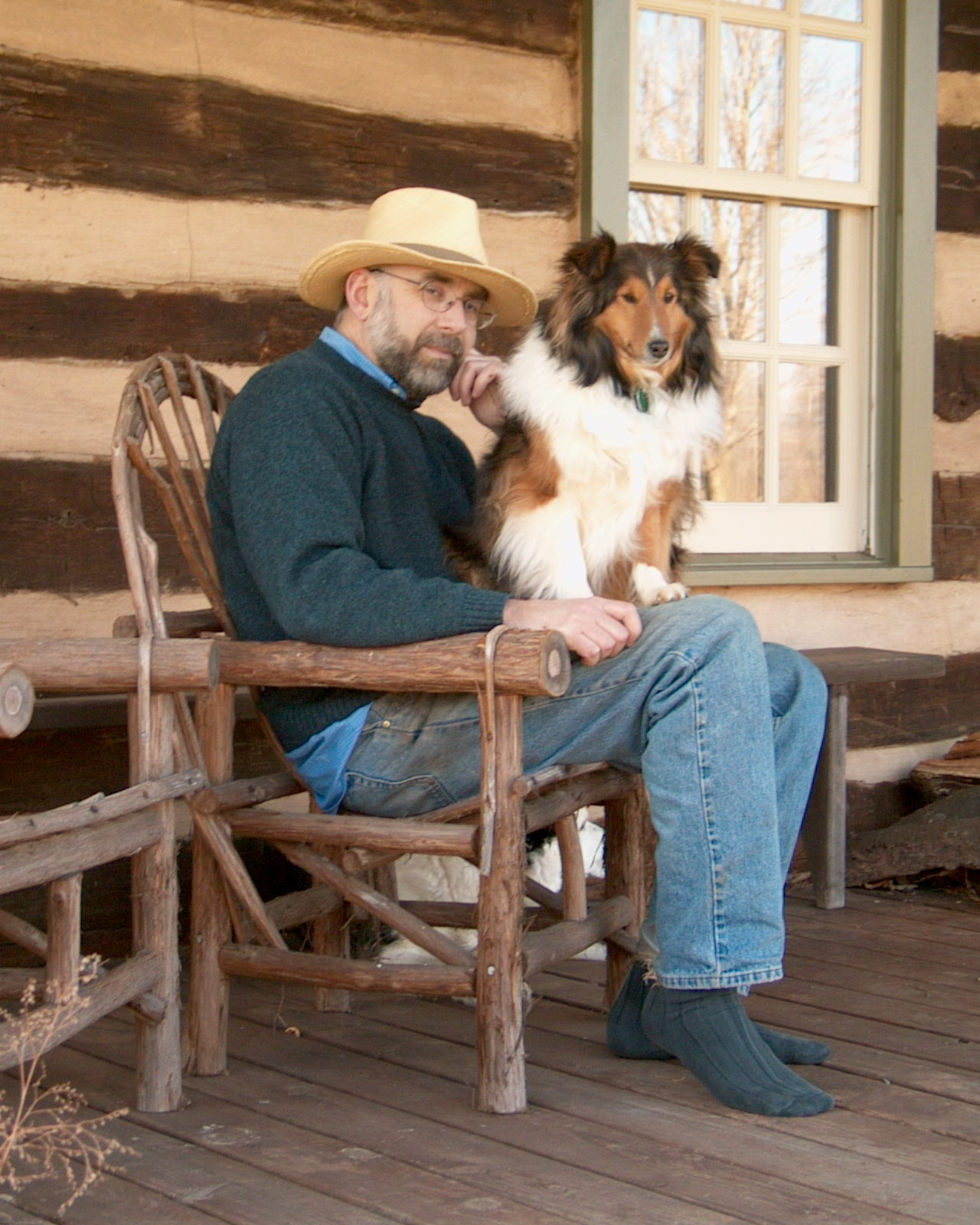
- Born: March 3, 1957 (age 69); Boston, Massachusetts, U.S.
- Education: Yale University (BS); Harvard University (MS)
- Occupations: Writer, historian and biographer
- Spouse: Martha Polkey (m. 1982)
- Children: 2
- Father: Bernard Budiansky
- Website: www.budiansky.com

Stephen Budiansky (/bʌdiˈænski/; born March 3, 1957) is an American writer, historian and biographer, best known for his books on animal behaviour and his criticism of animal rights. He is also the author of a number of scholarly publications about the history of cryptography, military and intelligence history, and music.

== Early life and career ==
Stephen Budiansky was born on March 3, 1957, in Boston, the son of Bernard Budiansky, who was a professor of structural mechanics at Harvard University. He grew up in Lexington, Massachusetts, and graduated from Lexington High School. He graduated with a B.S. in chemistry at Yale University in 1978 and an M.S. in applied mathematics at Harvard University in 1979. From 1979 to 1982 he was a magazine editor and radio producer at the American Chemical Society in Washington, D.C. He was editor for the American Chemical Society's journal Environmental Science & Technology and was the producer for the Society's radio show Man and Molecules.

== Journalism and books ==
Budiansky joined the staff of the science journal Nature as Washington correspondent and later served as its Washington editor. In 1985–86 he was a Congressional Fellow at the U.S. Congress Office of Technology Assessment, where he co-authored a study of advanced conventional weapons technologies as a means for reducing NATO's reliance on nuclear deterrence.

In 1986 Budiansky joined the staff of U.S. News & World Report, where he worked for twelve years in a variety of writing and editing positions, covering science and national security issues. He ultimately served as the magazine's deputy editor, the No. 3 editorial position. After leaving U.S. News, Budiansky criticized its college and university rankings.

Since 1998, Budiansky has been a full-time author and freelance contributor to publications including The Atlantic Monthly, The New York Times, The Washington Post, and The Economist. His writing has focused on three main areas: intellectual biography; military history; and the evolution and behavior of domesticated animals.

From 2007 to 2008 he was the editor of World War II magazine, where he oversaw a complete redesign and brought in well-known writers and historians to contribute to the publication. He is also a member of the editorial board of Cryptologia, the scholarly journal of codes and codebreaking.

His 2005 article "The Kids Play Great. But That Music..." in The Washington Post on the poor quality of school-music repertoire generated considerable attention and controversy among music educators and composers. He subsequently collaborated with Tim Foley, the 26th director of the United States Marine Band, on a scholarly article further exploring the problem and recommending solutions.

== Views on animals ==
Budiansky is a staunch critic of animal rights and has defended animal agriculture. He has said that he disagrees with animal rights on "moral, biological, social, legal, philosophical, evolutionary, and aesthetic grounds". He supports fox hunting and is a member of the Loudoun Hunt Club.

In 1998, Budiansky's authored If a Lion Could Talk: Animal Intelligence and the Evolution of Consciousness a critical look at experimental research on animal cognition. In it he denies animal consciousness and also speculates that animals might not feel pain. Budiansky contends that animals lack consciousness because they do not have language and has stated that "whether or not languages causes consciousness, language is so intimately tied to consciousness that the two seem inseparable". Budiansky explains animal behaviour through a neo-Darwinian perspective as associative learning and evolutionary adaptation for survival. He argues that animals do not deserve equal consideration because unlike humans they do not have moral agency.

Biologist Jerry Coyne negatively reviewed the book, noting that "the main problems with Budiansky's own conclusions are clear to those familiar with the scientific literature. The author makes seemingly devastating and unrebutted attacks on experiments, but in reality many of these studies seem quite credible." Philosopher Jerry Fodor gave the book a mixed review, claiming it is easy to read and well researched but taking issue with Budiansky for trying to explain cases of animal intelligence by associative learning. Fodor remarked that it is "primarily his passion for Morgan's Canon that turns Budiansky's book into an obsessive hunt for flaws in arguments or experiments that suggest that animals might be smart."

Budiansky in his book The Covenant of the Wild argues that domestication of animals is not an act of exploitation but an evolutionary strategy that has benefited animals and humans. The book has been described as an attempt to discredit animal rights and the environmental movement. Palaeontologist Niles Eldredge negatively reviewed much of The Covenant of the Wild, noting that many of Budiansky's arguments convey a false message and were driven by emotion. Eldredge suggested that Budiansky lacks knowledge about evolutionary biology, as he confused artificial selection with natural selection and criticized the book for lumping together the animal rights movement with conservationist concerns about species extinction. Eldredge concluded that "conservationists are not teary-eyed sentimentalists or folks who want to return to some fantasy of a pristine natural state, as Budiansky strives so mightily to convince us." Budiansky's idea that domestication originated through an "animal contract" with humans has been described as "successfully discredited".

Budiansky authored The Nature of Horses, which received positive reviews. Palaeontologist Christine Janis praised Budiansky for his personal interest in horses and recommended the book as suitable for an undergraduate seminar. Janis suggested that "the book presents excellent coverage of recent scientific discoveries and ideas that concern horses, written for both the layperson and the scientist".

== Personal life ==
Stephen Budiansky lives on a small farm in Loudoun County, Virginia. He married Martha Polkey in 1982; they have a daughter and a son.

== Awards ==
Budiansky was awarded a John Simon Guggenheim Memorial Foundation Fellowship in 2011 to complete his biography of the American composer Charles Ives. In 2006, he was the Caroline D. Bain scholar-in-residence at Smith College. He received the Army Historical Foundation's Distinguished Writing Award in 2004 for an article in American Heritage on the Civil War intelligence chief George H. Sharpe. Two of his books have been short-listed for the Rhône-Poulenc Prize for Science Books.

== Selected publications ==
- A Day in September: The Battle of Antietam and the World It Left Behind. (2024). ISBN 978-1-324-03575-6.
- Journey to the Edge of Reason: The Life of Kurt Gödel (2021). ISBN 978-0-393-35820-9.
- Oliver Wendell Holmes: A Life in War, Law, and Ideas (2019). ISBN 978-0-393-63472-3.
- Code Warriors: NSA's Codebreakers and the Secret Intelligence War Against the Soviet Union (2017). ISBN 978-080-417-097-0.
- Mad Music: Charles Ives, the Nostalgic Rebel (2014). University Press of New England. ISBN 978-1-61168-399-8.
- Blackett's War: The Men Who Defeated the Nazi U-Boats and Brought Science to the Art of Warfare (2013). Knopf. ISBN 978-0307595966, detailing the contributions to the war effort made by Patrick Blackett and his scientific colleagues in the early 1940s.
- Perilous Fight: America's Intrepid War with Britain on the High Seas, 1812–1815 (2011). Knopf. ISBN 978-0-307-27069-6.
- Murder, by the Book (2008). Black Sheep Press. ISBN 978-1-4348-3767-7.
- The Bloody Shirt: Terror After the Civil War (2007). Viking. ISBN 978-0-452-29016-7.
- Her Majesty's Spymaster: Elizabeth I, Sir Francis Walsingham, and the Birth of Modern Espionage (2005). Viking. ISBN 978-0-452-28747-1.
- Air Power: The Men, Machines, and Ideas That Revolutionized War, from Kitty Hawk to Iraq (2004). Viking. ISBN 0-14-303474-X.
- The Character of Cats (2002). Viking. ISBN 0-670-03093-7.
- The Truth About Dogs (2000). Viking. ISBN 0-670-89272-6.
- The World According to Horses: How They Run, See, and Think (2000). Henry Holt. ISBN 0-8050-6054-5.
- Battle of Wits: The Complete Story of Codebreaking in World War II (2000). Free Press. ISBN 978-0-7432-1734-7.
- If a Lion Could Talk: Animal Intelligence and the Evolution of Consciousness (1998). Free Press. ISBN 0-684-83710-2.
- The Nature of Horses (1997). Free Press. ISBN 978-0-684-82768-1.
- Nature's Keepers (1995). Free Press. ISBN 0-02-904915-6.
- The Covenant of the Wild (1992). Yale University Press (reprint ed., 1999). ISBN 978-0-300-07993-7.
