= Robot fish =

Robot designed to move like a living fish

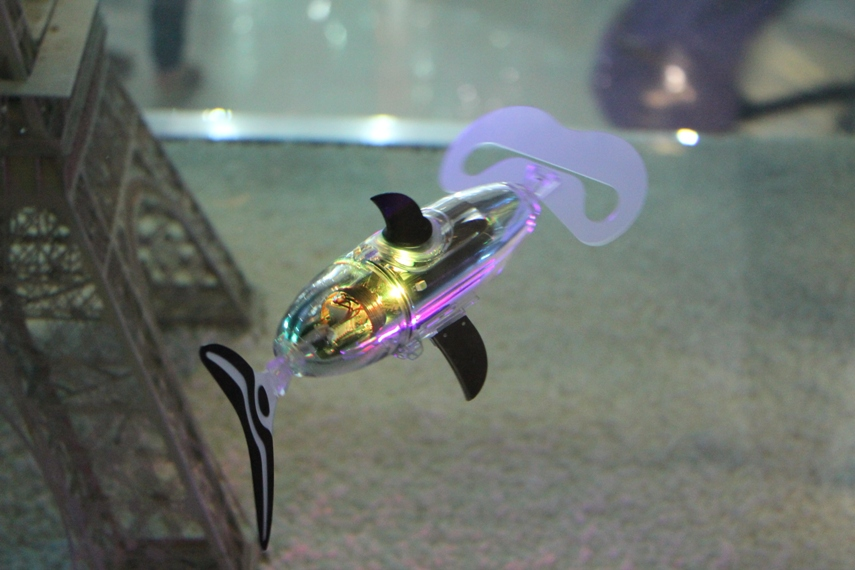
Jessiko robot fish on France Pavilion at Yeosu 2012 World Expo

A robot fish is a type of bionic robot that has the shape and locomotion of a living fish. Most robot fish are designed to emulate living fish which use body-caudal fin (BCF) propulsion, and can be divided into three categories: single joint (SJ), multi-joint (MJ) and smart material-based "soft-body" design.

Since the Massachusetts Institute of Technology first published research on them in 1989, there have been more than 400 articles published about robot fish. According to these reports, approximately 40 different types of robot fish have been built, with 30 designs having only the capability to flip and drift in water. The most important parts of researching and developing robot fish are advancing their control and navigation, enabling them to interact and "communicate" with their environment, making it possible for them to travel along a particular path, and to respond to commands to make their "fins" flap.

== Design ==
The basic biomimetic robotic fish is made up of three parts: a streamlined head, a body, and a tail.

- The head is often made of a rigid plastic material (i.e. fiberglass) and contains all control units including a wireless communication module, batteries, and a signal processor.
- The body may be made of multiple jointed segments, which are connected by servomotors. Servomotors control the rotation angle of the joint. Some designs have pectoral fins fixed on both sides of the body to ensure stability in the water
- An oscillating caudal (tail) fin connected with joints and driven by a motor provides motive power.

=== Design inspiration ===
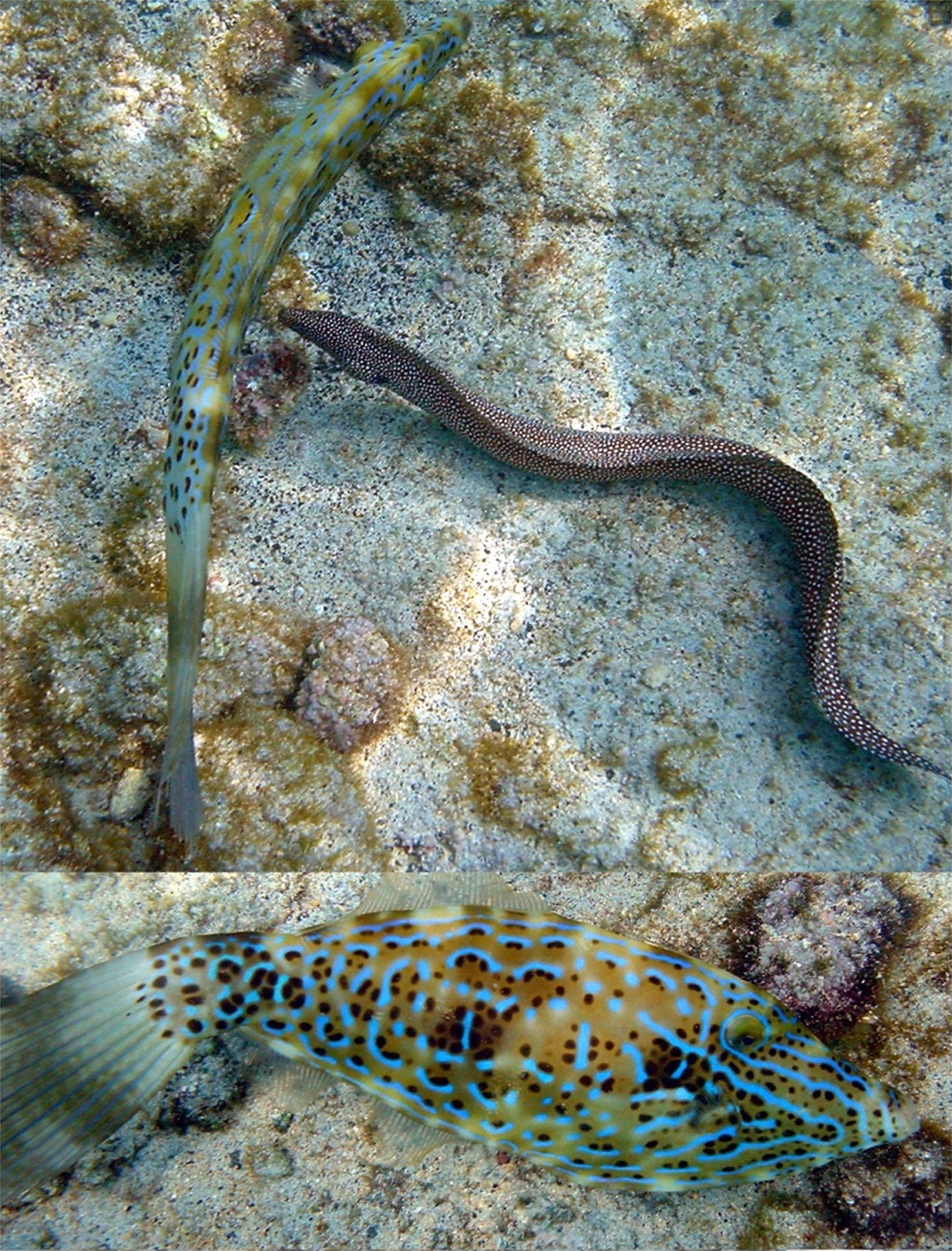
Eel and fish locomotion

Engineers often focus on functional design. For example, designers attempt to create robots with flexible bodies (like real fish) that can exhibit undulatory motion. This kind of body enables the robot fish to swim similar to the way live fish swim, which can adapt and process a complicated environment. The first robot fish (MIT's RoboTuna) was designed to mimic the structure and dynamic properties of a Tuna. In an attempt to gain thrust and maneuvering forces, robot fish control systems are capable of controlling the body and caudal fin, giving them a wave-like motion.

In order to control and analyze robotic fish movement, researchers study the shape, dynamic model and lateral movements of the robotic tail. One of the many tail shapes found on robot fish is lunate, or crescent shaped. Some studies show this kind of tail shape increases swimming speeds and creates a high-efficiency robot fish.

The posterior tail creates thrust force, making it one of the most important parts of the robot fish. Living fish have powerful muscles that can generate lateral movements for locomotion while the head remains in a relatively motionless state. Thus, researchers have focused on tail kinematics when developing robot fish motion.

Slender-body theory is often used when studying robot fish locomotion. The mean rate of work of the lateral movements is equal to the sum of the mean rate of work available for producing the mean thrust and the rate of shedding of kinetic energy of lateral fluid motions. The mean thrust can be calculated entirely from the displacement and swimming speed at the trailing edge of the caudal fin. This simple formula is used when calculating the locomotion of both robot and living fish.

Realistic Propulsion Systems can help improve autonomous maneuvering and exhibit a higher level of locomotion performance. A diverse option of fins can be used in the creation of robot fish to achieve this goal. By including pectoral fins, robot fish can perform force vectoring and perform complex swimming behaviors instead of forward swimming only.

=== Control ===
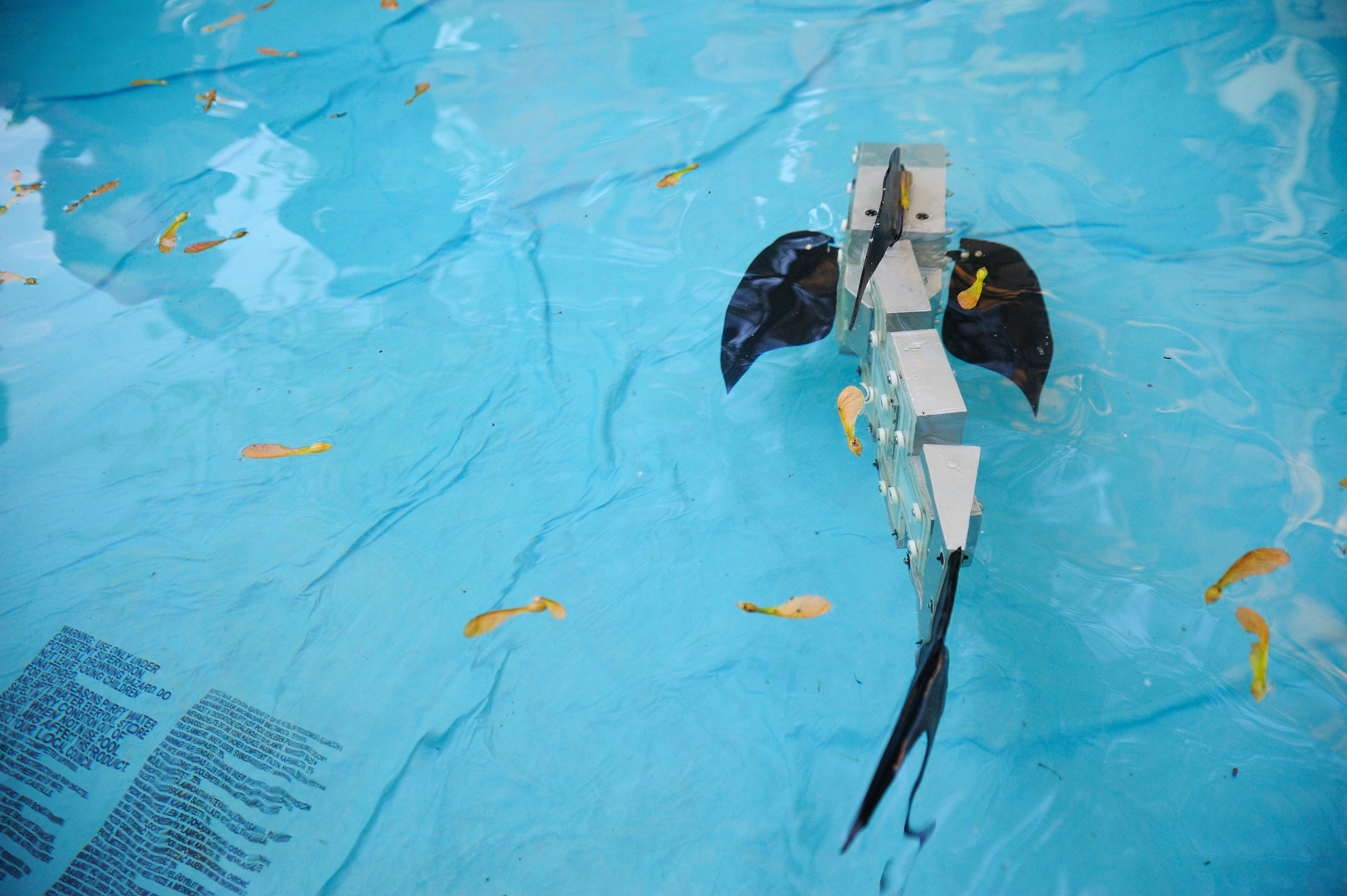
Multi-joint robotic fish

The shapes and sizes of fins vary drastically in living fish, but they all help to accomplish a high level of propulsion through the water. In order for robot fish to achieve the same type of rapid and maneuverable propulsion, robot fish need multiple control surfaces. The propulsive performance is related to the position, mobility, and hydrodynamic characteristics of the control surfaces.

The key to controlling a multi-joint robotic fish is creating a simplified mechanism that is able to generate a reasonable amount of control. Designers should consider some important factors, including lateral body motions, kinematic data and anatomical data. When designers mimic a BCF-type robot fish, the link-based body wave of the robot fish must provide motions similar to that of a living fish. This kind of body wave-based swimming control should be discrete and parameterized for a specific swimming gait. Ensuring swimming stability gait can be difficult, and transitioning smoothly between two different gaits can be tricky in robot fish.

A central neural system known as a "Central Pattern Generator" (CPGs) can govern multilink robotic fish locomotion. The CPG is located in every segment, and can connect and stimulate contracting or stretching muscles. The cerebrum, the most anterior part of the brain in vertebrates, can control signal inputs to startup, stop and turn. After the systems form a steady locomotion, the signal from the cerebrum stops and the CPGs can produce and modulate locomotion patterns.

Similar to their role in living fish, neural networks are used to control robot fish. There are several key points in the design of bionic neural networks. First, the bionic propeller adopts one servomotor to drive a joint while the fish has two group muscles in each joint. Designers can implement one CPG in each segment to control the corresponding joint. Second, a discrete computational model stimulates the continuous biological tissues. Finally, the connection lag time between neurons determines the intersegmental phase lag. The lag time function in the computational model is necessary.

== Uses ==
=== Studying fish behavior ===
Achieving a consistent response is a challenge in animal behavioral studies when live stimuli are used as independent variables. To overcome this challenge, robots can be used as consistent stimuli for testing hypotheses while avoiding large animal training and use. The controllable machines can be made to "look, sound, or even smell" like animals. We can obtain a better perception of animal behavior by turning to robot use in place of live animals because robots can produce a steady response in a set of repeatable actions. Moreover, with various field deployments and a greater degree of independence, robots hold the promise of assisting behavioral studies in the wild.

=== Toys ===
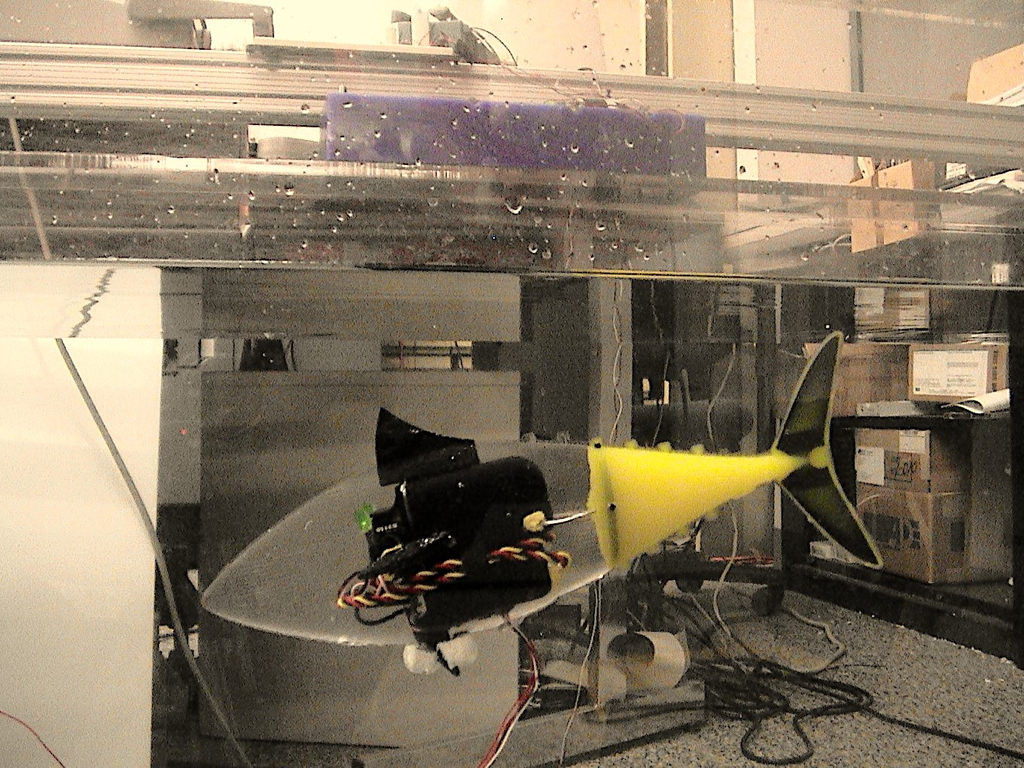
A simple robot fish consisting of a flexible visco-elastic body

Toy robot fish are the most common robot toys on the market. they are most commonly used for entertainment, although some are used for research. The design of these toys are simple and inexpensive. They are usually divided into two categories: automatic cruise robot fish and controlled movement robot fish. The simplest ones consist of a soft body (MJ), motor (tail) and head (basic electric control element). They use a battery to provide energy for the motor to produce movement and use the remote control systems to achieve the power of steering. In contrast, the complexity of toys and robot fish, with the purpose of research, is almost the same. They are not only fully automated, but can simulate fish behavior. For example, if you put a foreign object in the water with the robot fish, it will produce a movement similar to that of a real fish. It will move away from the foreign object and the speed of swimming will increase. It exhibits a state of shock and confusion to the foreign object much like a real fish would. Robot fish record this type of behavior in advance.

=== Application on AUV ===
Military defense and marine protection are of rising concern in the research field. As missions become more complicated, high-performance Autonomous underwater vehicle (AUVs) become necessary. AUVs require fast propulsion and multidirectional maneuverability. Robotic fish are more competent than current AUVs propelled by motion because the fish is a paradigm of bio-inspired AUV. Like living fish, robot fish can operate in complex environments. They can not only perform underwater exploration and discover new species, but they can also salvage and set up underwater facilities. When operating in dangerous environments, robot fish display a heightened performance when compared to other machines. For example, in the coral zone, soft robotic fish can better cope with the environment. Unlike existing AUVs which are non-flexible, robot fish can access narrow caves and tunnels.

=== Education ===
Besides their vast potentials for research, robotic fish also show many opportunities to engage students and the general public. Bio-inspired robots are valuable and effective, and can attract students to various areas of science, technology, engineering and math. Robotic fish have been used as auxiliary educational tools all over the world. For example, thousands of youth were attracted to the carp-like robots during a recent exhibit at London Aquarium. Scientists and other researchers have presented various kinds of robotic fish at many outreach programs, including the first and second USA Science and Engineering Festivals, in 2010 and 2012, respectively. At these events, visitors were given the opportunity not only to see the robotic fish in action, but also interacted with the lab members to understand the technology and its applications.

== Examples ==
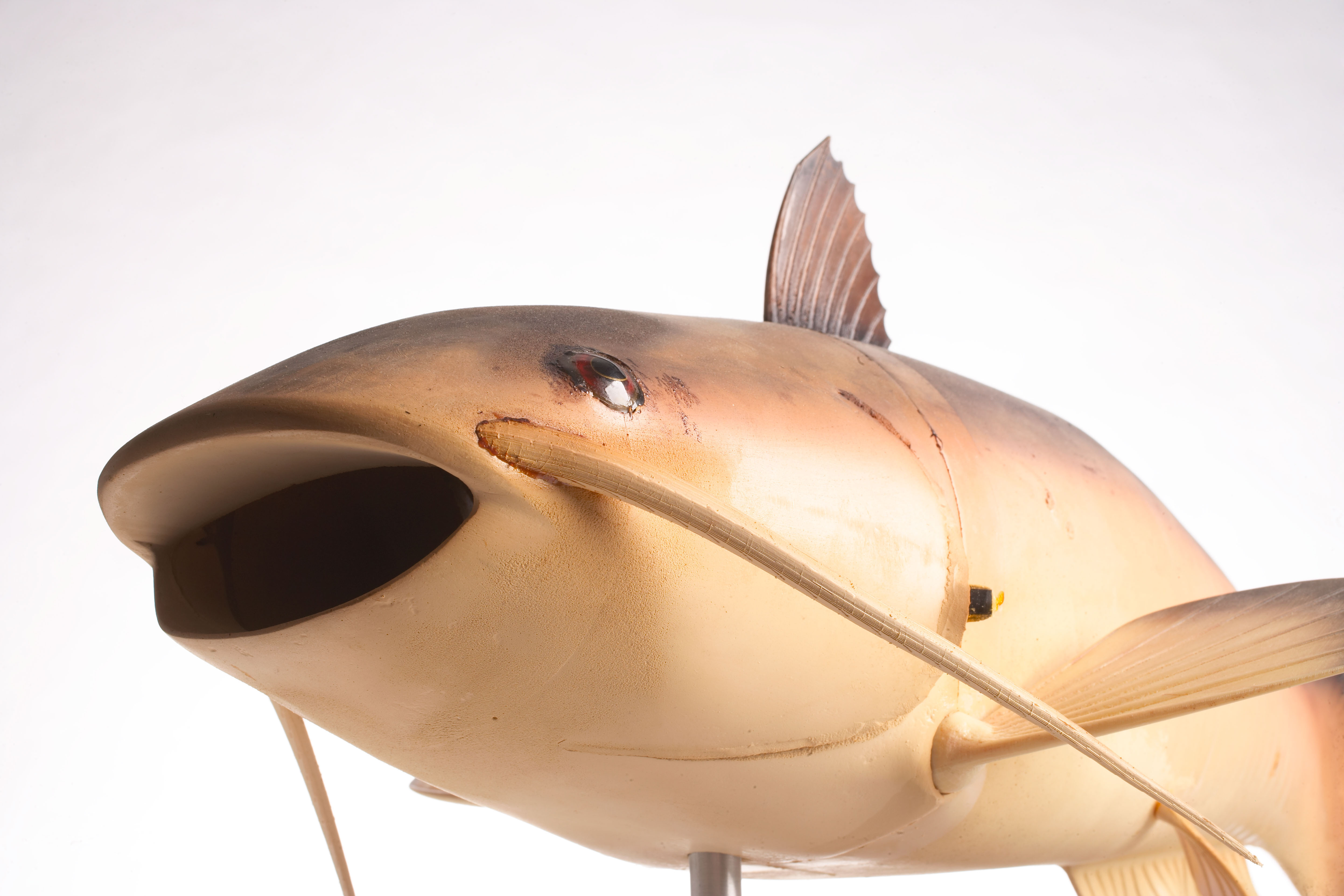
"Charlie", a robotic catfish built by the CIA

- In the 1990s, the CIA's Office of Advanced Technologies built a robotic catfish named "Charlie" as part of a study of the feasibility of unmanned underwater vehicles. The robot was designed to collect underwater intelligence and water samples while remaining undetected, and was controlled by a line-of-sight wireless radio handset.
- The RoboTuna is a robotic fish with the shape and function of the real tuna fish, which was designed and built by a team of scientists at the Massachusetts Institute of Technology (MIT). It has a complicated system of stainless-steel cables and pulleys which act as muscles and tendons. The outer body is composed of a flexible layer of foam covered with Lycra, an elastic polyurethane fiber, to emulate the flexibility and smoothness of tuna skin. It is controlled by six powerful servomotors at two horse-power each. It can adjust its motions in real-time because of force sensors positioned on the side of the ribs which provide continuous feedback to the robot.
- Robot Pike is the world's first free-swimming robot fish designed and built by a team of scientists at MIT. It is controlled by human intervention. The complex computer system interprets the commands and returns the signals to each engine in the robot fish. It has a skin composed of silicone rubber and a spring-wound fiberglass exoskeleton which makes the robot fish flexible. It can accelerate at a rate of eight to twelve m/s in the water, but it cannot avoid obstructions because it is not equipped with sensors.
- The Essex Robotic Fish was built by scientists at Essex University. It can swim autonomously like a real fish, and achieve different types of displacement. It has four computers, five motors, and over ten sensors placed in various places on the body. It can swim around a tank and avoid objects, and can also adapt to uncertain and unpredictable stimuli in its environment. It is intended to have a broad range of uses, including seabed exploration, detection of leaks in oil pipelines, sea life exploration, and spying.
- The Jessiko is an underwater robot created by French start-up company Robotswim. It is only 22 cm long, making it one of the smallest robotic fish in the world. It is very easy to control, can travel backward, shift colors, and imitate living fish performance. Because of these functions, it can share emotions and even interact with people. It exhibits artificial intelligence and potential communication uses, giving it the ability to swim with more than ten fish to create exciting choreography and light effects, using fins to navigate throughout the water. It has demonstrated that a small robot fish can swim autonomously for hours.
- The Robotic Fish SPC-03 was designed by the Chinese Academy of Sciences (CASIA). It can swim 1,23-meters away from the controlling source in the water. It is steady, particle in its design, and is controlled remotely by technicians. It can work 2 to 3 hours immersed at the maximum speed of 4 km/h. The fish can capture and transfer photos, perform cartography of the underwater funds, and transport small objects.
- The Robotic Koi was designed and developed by Ryomei Engineering of Hiroshima, Japan. It is 80 centimeters and weighs 12 kg, and is remote controlled. The Robotic Koi can be used to study the oxygen concentration in the water through the sensors located on its mouth. It can gather information about the other species in its environment by swimming among them and reporting on the health of fish. Equipped with a camera, it can record the resources present in depths of the water. It could also be used to survey damage to bridges and oil platforms underwater.
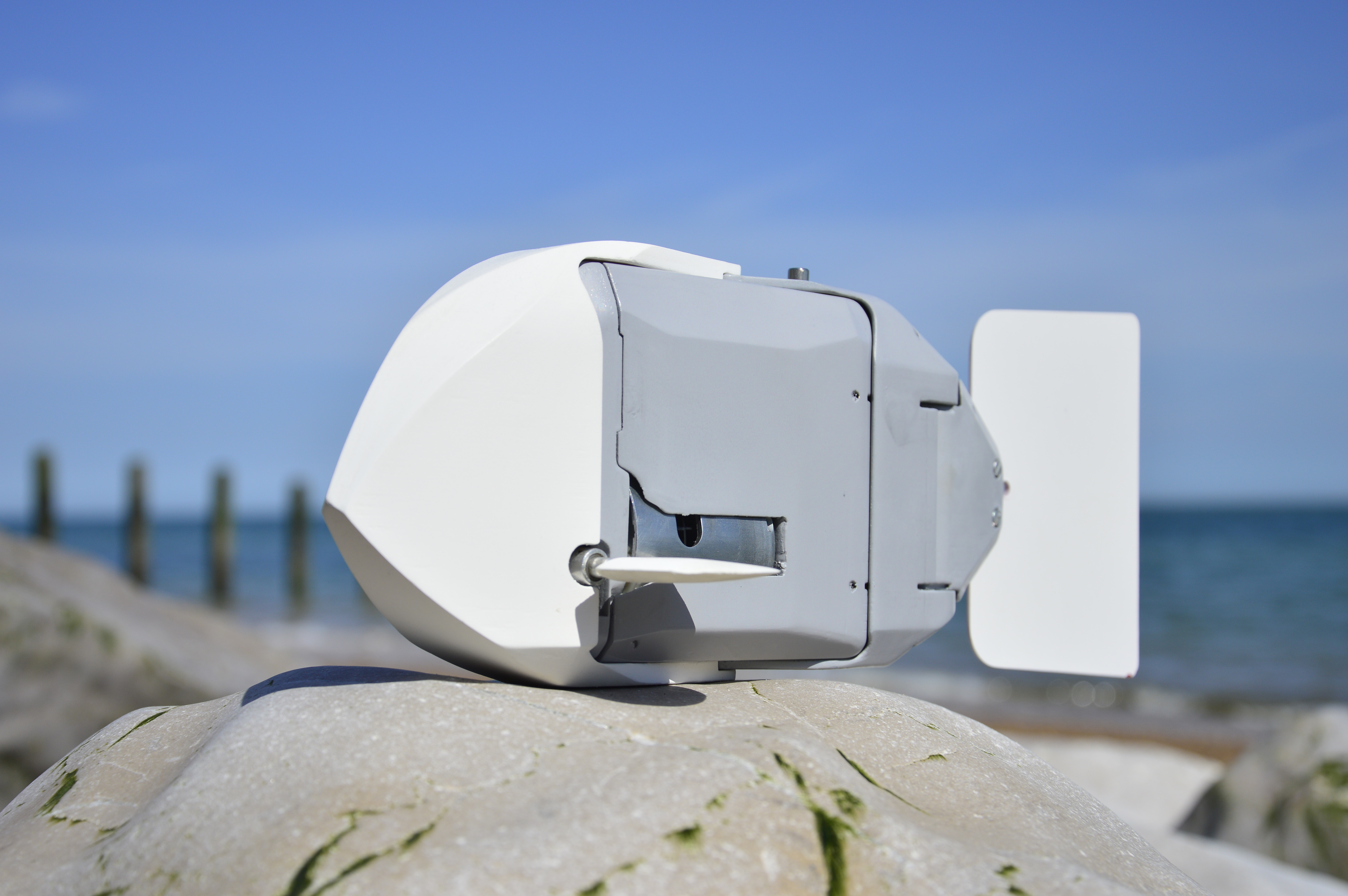
  Robotic Fish: iSplash-II
- In 2014, iSplash-II was developed by PhD student Richard James Clapham and Prof. Huosheng Hu at Essex University. It was the first robotic fish capable of outperforming real carangiform fish, a fish that moves its head slightly but builds considerable amplitude of motion towards the tail, in terms of average maximum velocity (measured in body lengths/ second) and endurance. iSplash-II attained swimming speeds of 11.6BL/s (i.e. 3.7 m/s). The first build, iSplash-I (2014) was the first robotic platform to apply a full-body length carangiform swimming motion, which was found to increase swimming speed by 27% over the traditional approach of a posterior confined waveform.
- Aquaai Corporation has developed a supersized clownfish underwater drone equipped with a payload of cameras and sensors to provide data in an effort to help protect the seas. The drone blends in with the natural environment better than the average robot and has been used in both California and Norway to check water quality and fish health. Aquaai is now aiming to help the Middle East by using the robotic clownfish for water management, sustainable aquaculture operations, detecting ghost fishing gear, and coral health monitoring.
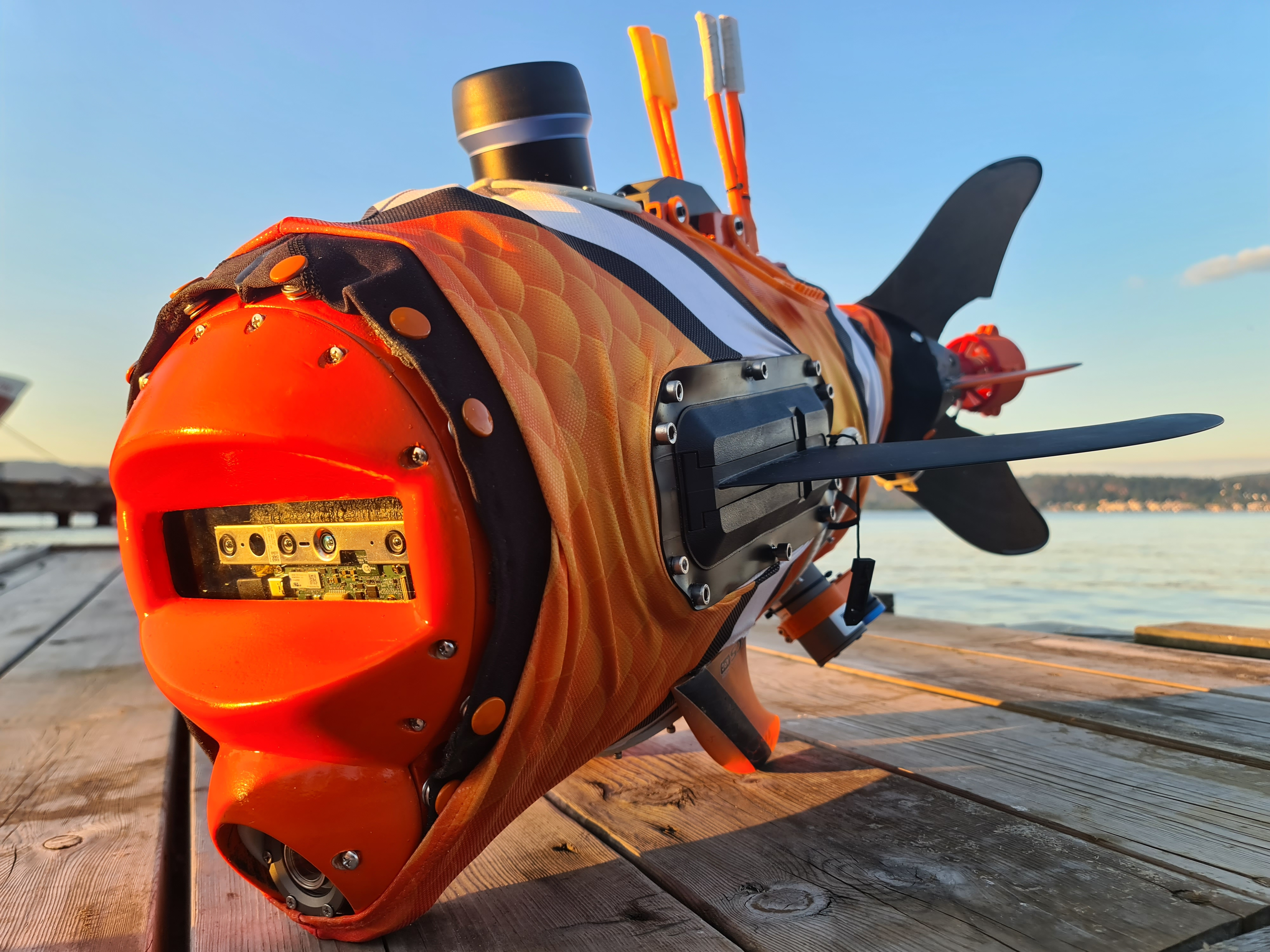
  Aquaai's robot clownfish
