= Bernard Budiansky =

American applied mechanics engineer (1925–1999)

- Born: 8 March 1925
- Died: 23 January 1999 (aged 73)
- Education: B.S., City College of New York, 1944, Ph.D., Brown University, 1950
- Awards: Eringen Medal (1985)
- Scientific career
- Fields: plasticity Buckling shell structures
- Workplaces: Harvard
- Doctoral advisor: William Prager
- Doctoral students: John W. Hutchinson; Olvi L. Mangasarian

Bernard Budiansky (/bʌdiˈænski/; 8 March 1925 – 23 January 1999) was an American scholar in the field of applied mechanics, and made seminal contributions to the mechanics of structures and mechanics of materials. He was a recipient of the Timoshenko Medal.

== Biography ==
Budiansky was born in New York City on March 8, 1925, to Russian immigrant parents, Louis and Rose (Chaplick) Budiansky. Upon obtaining a Bachelor of Civil Engineering degree from City College of New York in 1944 when he was barely over 19, he became an aeronautical research scientist at the National Advisory Committee for Aeronautics (NACA, forerunner to NASA) at Langley Field, Virginia.

He took an educational leave from NACA to enroll in 1947 in the graduate program in applied mathematics at Brown University, completing his Ph.D. in 1950 with a dissertation entitled Fundamental Theorems and Consequences of the Slip Theory of Plasticity. He returned to Langley in 1950 and, in 1952, was appointed Head of the Structural Mechanics Branch. He joined the faculty of Harvard in 1955.

He made widely cited contributions on the way that fissures and joints in rocks affect the propagation of seismic waves, which has become a standard basis for inferring rock properties in the Earth, and contributed to understanding stressing and deformation in the inflation of the human lung.

His work of the later years was focused on problems in the domain of materials science, explaining mechanical properties of solids in terms of microscopic mechanisms. He referred to this important area as "micromechanics". He was one of its pioneers, and contributed to explanation of the fracture of ductile metals and the toughening of normally brittle ceramics and composite materials.

Budiansky won many honors including the AIAA 1970 Dryden Research Lecturer; CCNY 1974 Townsend Harris Medal; ASCE 1982 von Karman Medal; Society of Engineering Science 1985 Eringen Medal; ASME 1989 Timoshenko Medal. He received honorary doctorates from Northwestern University 1986 and Technion Israel Institute of Technology. In addition he was a member of the National Academy of Sciences, the National Academy of Engineering, the American Academy of Arts and Sciences; the Royal Netherlands Academy of Arts and Sciences; and the Danish Center for Applied Mathematics and Mechanics. Professional affiliations included: ASCE, ASME, AIAA, and AGU.

Bernard Budiansky died January 23, 1999, at his home in Lexington, Massachusetts, aged 73. He was survived by his wife and two sons, one of whom is writer Stephen Budiansky.

== See also ==
- Mechanicians
- Applied mechanics
