= Journal of the Mechanics and Physics of Solids =

- Discipline: Physics of solid mechanics
- Language: English
- Edited by: Vikram Deshpande

Publication details
- History: Since 1952
- Publisher: Elsevier
- Frequency: Monthly
- Open access: Hybrid
- Impact factor: 6.2 (2025)

Standard abbreviations
- ISO 4: J. Mech. Phys. Solids

Indexing
- CODEN: JMPSA8
- ISSN: 0022-5096 (print); 1873-4782 (web)

Links
- Journal homepage; Online archive

The Journal of the Mechanics and Physics of Solids is a monthly peer-reviewed scientific journal covering research, theory, and practice concerning the properties of solid materials. The journal was established in 1952 by Rodney Hill and is published by Elsevier. As of February 2025, the editor-in-chief is Vikram Deshpande (University of Cambridge). According to the Journal Citation Reports, the journal has a 2025 impact factor of 6.2.

== Abstracting and indexing ==
The journal is abstracted and indexed in:

- Applied Mechanics Reviews
- Chemical Abstracts Service
- Ei Compendex
- INIS Atomindex
- Mathematical Reviews
- PASCAL
- Science Abstracts
- Scopus
- Science Citation Index Expanded

== See also ==
- Solid mechanics
- Materials science
