= International Association for Computational Mechanics =

International scientific society for computational mechanics

- Abbreviation: IACM
- Formation: 1981; 45 years ago
- Founders: Richard H. Gallagher, J. Tinsley Oden, Olgierd Zienkiewicz
- Type: International scientific society
- Headquarters: Secretariat in Barcelona, Spain
- Region served: Worldwide
- Members: 33 affiliated national and regional associations
- President: John Dolbow
- Main organ: General Council; Executive Council
- Publication: IACM Expressions
- Affiliations: International Union of Theoretical and Applied Mechanics
- Website: iacm.info

The International Association for Computational Mechanics (IACM) is an international scientific society dedicated to computational mechanics, specifically developing and applying numerical methods and digital computers to solve problems in engineering and the applied sciences. Established in 1981 through the efforts of Richard H. Gallagher, J. Tinsley Oden, and Olgierd Zienkiewicz, the association unites 33 affiliated national and regional associations across the Americas, the Asia-Pacific region, and Europe, the Middle East, and Africa.

The association organizes the biennial World Congress on Computational Mechanics (WCCM) and confers several international awards, the highest of which is the IACM Congress Medal, also known as the Gauss–Newton Medal. The 2026 congress in Munich, held jointly with ECCOMAS, drew more than 5,000 participants from 65 countries. Since 1984, IACM has been an affiliated organization of the IUTAM.

== History ==
In 1981, Richard H. Gallagher, J. Tinsley Oden, and Olgierd C. Zienkiewicz wrote to colleagues to propose an international body for the emerging field of computational mechanics. The letter led to a meeting of twelve people at the Georgia Institute of Technology in Atlanta in April 1981, where the group proposed a network of international centers of computational mechanics. The meeting led to the association's formal announcement and the creation of a Founding Council and a constitution.

In its early years, the association was managed by a committee formed by John Argyris, Gallagher, Harold Liebowitz, Tsuyoshi Kawai, Oden and Zienkiewicz. Zienkiewicz served as the first president from 1986 to 1990 and was succeeded by Oden, who had chaired the first World Congress on Computational Mechanics in Austin, Texas, in 1986. Oden remained a member of the Executive Council until 2022.

The association became affiliated with IUTAM in 1984. In 1996 the IUTAM General Assembly appointed a set of working parties to strengthen cooperation with its affiliated organizations, among them a working party on computational mechanics associated with IACM.

== Organization ==
According to its constitution, IACM assigns equal importance to three regions: the Americas, Asia–Australia, and Europe, the Middle East, and Africa. The association's objectives include promoting education, research, and practice in computational mechanics, fostering interdisciplinary exchange, providing forums for knowledge dissemination, and upholding high ethical standards in research.

The association is governed by two bodies:

- The General Council sets general policy and meets at each World Congress. Each affiliated association is represented in proportion to its membership; the council also includes presidents of affiliated associations, Executive Council members, and honorary members.
- The Executive Council manages the scientific, technical and financial affairs of the association. It has up to 21 ordinary members, elected by the General Council for six-year terms, with one third renewed every two years.

Every four years the Executive Council elects from among its members a president, three vice-presidents (one for each region) and a secretary-general. The secretariat is based in Barcelona, on the North Campus of the Polytechnic University of Catalonia.

Membership categories include individual members, members of affiliated national or regional associations, institutional members, corporate members, and honorary members.

=== Presidents ===
In addition to Zienkiewicz and Oden, past presidents of the association include Thomas J. R. Hughes, Eugenio Oñate, Alf Samuelsson, Genki Yagawa, Wing Kam Liu (2014–2018), Antonio Huerta (2018–2022) and Kenjiro Terada (2022–2026). As of 2026, the president is John Dolbow (United States) and the secretary-general is Marek Behr (Germany).

=== Affiliated associations ===
IACM has 33 affiliated associations. They include the U.S. Association for Computational Mechanics (USACM), the German Association for Computational Mechanics (GACM), the Japan Society for Computational Engineering and Science (JSCES), the Japan Association for Computational Mechanics (JACM), the Chinese Association of Computational Mechanics (CACM), the UK Association for Computational Mechanics (UKACM), the Spanish Society of Computational Mechanics and Engineering (SEMNI), the Argentine Association for Computational Mechanics (AMCA) and the Brazilian Association for Computational Methods in Engineering (ABMEC).

== World Congress on Computational Mechanics ==
The World Congress on Computational Mechanics (WCCM) is the association's principal meeting. Held every four years from 1986 to 1998, the congress has met biennially since 2002, rotating among the three designated regions. Several editions have been organized in collaboration with regional bodies, including the European Community on Computational Methods in Applied Sciences (ECCOMAS).

World Congresses on Computational Mechanics
Edition	Year	Host city	Notes
1st	1986	Austin, United States	Chaired by J. Tinsley Oden
2nd	1990	Stuttgart, Germany	
3rd	1994	Tokyo, Japan	
4th	1998	Buenos Aires, Argentina	Joint with CILAMCE
5th	2002	Vienna, Austria	
6th	2004	Beijing, China	
7th	2006	Century City, United States	
8th	2008	Venice, Italy	Joint with ECCOMAS
9th	2010	Sydney, Australia	Joint with APCOM
10th	2012	São Paulo, Brazil	Joint with CILAMCE
11th	2014	Barcelona, Spain	Joint with ECCOMAS
12th	2016	Seoul, South Korea	
13th	2018	New York, United States	
14th	2021	Paris, France (online)	Joint with ECCOMAS; originally scheduled for 2020
15th	2022	Yokohama, Japan (online)	Joint with APCOM
16th	2024	Vancouver, Canada	Joint with PANACM
17th	2026	Munich, Germany	Joint with ECCOMAS
18th	2028	Busan, South Korea	Joint with APCOM; scheduled

== Awards ==
IACM confers the following awards, usually presented at the World Congress:

- The IACM Congress Medal (Gauss–Newton Medal), the association's highest honour, for outstanding and sustained contributions to computational mechanics over a substantial part of a career.
- The O. C. Zienkiewicz Award, named after Olgierd Zienkiewicz, for outstanding and sustained contributions to the broad field of computational mechanics.
- The Oden Computational Mechanics Award, named after J. Tinsley Oden, for significant contributions to basic or applied computational mechanics.
- The John Argyris Award for Young Scientists and the Simo–Ladyzhenskaya Award.
- The IACM Fellows Award, which recognizes members with a distinguished record of research and sustained support of the association. It was first given in 1998 to 39 recipients.

=== Gauss–Newton Medal recipients ===
- 1986: Ray W. Clough
- 1990: John Argyris
- 1991: Richard H. Gallagher, Olgierd Zienkiewicz
- 1994: J. Tinsley Oden
- 1998: Thomas J. R. Hughes, Erwin Stein
- 2002: Ted Belytschko, Robert L. Taylor
- 2004: Franco Brezzi, D. R. J. Owen
- 2006: Ivo Babuška
- 2008: Ekkehard Ramm
- 2010: Eugenio Oñate
- 2012: Wing Kam Liu
- 2014: Charbel Farhat
- 2016: Bernhard A. Schrefler
- 2018: Pierre Ladevèze
- 2020: Xavier Oliver
- 2022: J. N. Reddy
- 2024: Peter Wriggers
- 2026: Alfio Quarteroni

In its early years the association also awarded a John von Neumann Medal; Richard H. Gallagher was among its recipients.

== Publications ==
The association publishes the bulletin IACM Expressions, which documents its activities and those of its affiliated associations. Issue 56 was released in May 2026.

== See also ==
- Computational mechanics
- European Community on Computational Methods in Applied Sciences
- International Union of Theoretical and Applied Mechanics
