= European Community on Computational Methods in Applied Sciences =

International scientific society

- Abbreviation: ECCOMAS
- Formation: 1993
- Type: Scientific organization
- Members: 23 member associations
- President: Trond Kvamsdal
- Website: eccomas.org

The European Community on Computational Methods in Applied Sciences (ECCOMAS) is a scientific organization comprising European associations focused on computational methods in science and technology. Established in 1993, ECCOMAS includes 23 member associations. Its mission is to foster collaboration among universities, research institutes, and industry in the development and application of numerical methods and computer simulation for engineering and applied sciences.

== History ==
The congress series predates the association itself. The first congress was held in Brussels in 1992, and ECCOMAS was founded the following year, in 1993. Its first president, Jacques Périaux, wanted an association at European scale that could carry knowledge on computational methods from universities and industry. He also built contacts with the European Commission and other European associations, and he strongly advocated cooperation with industry.

Oskar Mahrenholtz (1996–2000) built the first firm link between ECCOMAS' two main strands. He also negotiated an agreement with the International Association for Computational Mechanics (IACM) that settled early differences between the two associations.

Eugenio Oñate (2000–2004) introduced thematic conferences on specific, state-of-the-art topics. Their success raised ECCOMAS' profile worldwide, and other associations adopted the same model.

Herbert Mang (2005–2009) strengthened ties with industry and the European Commission. He also led the integration of the field's sub-disciplines, which made ECCOMAS a fully multidisciplinary association.

Manolis Papadrakakis (2009–2013) took office just after new bylaws were approved. During his term, ECCOMAS launched a newsletter, the Young Investigators Conferences and Olympiads for distinguished postdoctoral researchers.

Ekkehard Ramm (2013–2017) revised the constitution, formally establishing the executive committee and separating the mandates of the managing board and the general assembly. He merged the ECCM and ECFD conferences, uniting the solid and fluid mechanics communities. During this period, ECCOMAS also expanded onto social media and set up advanced schools and courses for young researchers.

In 2014, ECCOMAS co-organized the 11th World Congress on Computational Mechanics in Barcelona with the IACM, alongside the ECCM V and ECFD VI conferences. The association's 25th anniversary in 2018 was marked by joint ECCM and ECFD conferences in Glasgow.

Michal Kleiber (2017–2021) introduced a new constitution. He steered ECCOMAS through the early months of the COVID-19 pandemic and kept the community together. His term also marked the change from a four-year to a two-year cycle for the flagship congress. Until 2018, the congress, the ECCM conference, and the ECFD conference had formed a four-year cycle of main events.

The joint WCCM-ECCOMAS 2020 congress was held virtually in January 2021.

Ferdinando Auricchio was elected president in late 2020 and took office in 2021. Trond Kvamsdal leads ECCOMAS for the 2026–2032 term.

=== Presidents ===
Term	President
1993–1996	Jacques Périaux
1996–2000	Oskar Mahrenholtz
2000–2004	Eugenio Oñate
2005–2009	Herbert Mang
2009–2013	Manolis Papadrakakis
2013–2017	Ekkehard Ramm
2017–2021	Michal Kleiber
From 2021	Ferdinando Auricchio
2026–2032	Trond Kvamsdal

== Governance and membership ==
ECCOMAS is governed by two principal bodies. The general assembly is the highest authority and makes major decisions. The managing board oversees scientific, technical, and financial matters and includes representation from each member association. The executive committee oversees daily administrative operations.

The officers for the 2026–2032 term are:

Role	Officer
President	Trond Kvamsdal
Vice-president	Gianluigi Rozza
Secretary general	Stefanie Elgeti
Treasurer	Elie Hachem

Four technical committees address computational solid and structural mechanics, computational fluid dynamics, computational applied mathematics, and scientific computing. In addition, a Young Investigators Committee and an Industry Interest Group support early-career researchers and industry collaboration.

ECCOMAS covers solid and structural mechanics, fluid dynamics, acoustics, electromagnetics, physics, chemistry, applied mathematics, and scientific computing.

The 23 member associations consist of national and regional societies. Certain associations, such as the Central European Association for Computational Mechanics and the Nordic Association for Computational Mechanics, represent multiple countries. Membership also extends to associations in Israel, Russia, and Turkey.

== Congresses and conferences ==
The principal event is the biennial European Congress on Computational Methods in Applied Sciences and Engineering. The congress features invited lectures, special technological sessions, contributed papers from both academia and industry, and organized minisymposia.

The 9th congress took place in Lisbon from 3 to 7 June 2024 and was organized by the Portuguese association APMTAC. The program included eight plenary lectures, 20 semi-plenary lectures, 75 keynote lectures, 188 minisymposia, and approximately 2,600 presentations.

The 10th congress was held jointly with the 17th World Congress on Computational Mechanics, organized by the International Association for Computational Mechanics (IACM) and ECCOMAS. The event took place at the International Congress Centre in Munich from 19 to 24 July 2026.

Congresses to date:

Edition	Dates	Place	Notes
11th ECCOMAS	July 2028	Milan, Italy	Planned
17th WCCM and 10th ECCOMAS	19–24 July 2026	Munich, Germany	Joint with the IACM
9th ECCOMAS	3–7 June 2024	Lisbon, Portugal	Organized by APMTAC
8th ECCOMAS	5–9 June 2022	Oslo, Norway	
WCCM-ECCOMAS 2020	11–15 January 2021	Virtual	Joint with the IACM
ECCOMAS 2016	5–10 June 2016	Crete, Greece	
WCCM XI and ECCOMAS 2014	20–25 July 2014	Barcelona, Spain	Joint with the IACM
ECCOMAS 2012	10–14 September 2012	Vienna, Austria	
ECCOMAS 2008	30 June–5 July 2008	Venice, Italy	
ECCOMAS 2004	24–28 July 2004	Jyväskylä, Finland	
ECCOMAS 2000	11–14 September 2000	Barcelona, Spain	
ECCOMAS 1996	1996	Paris, France	
ECCOMAS 1992	1992	Brussels, Belgium	First congress

ECCOMAS endorses thematic, special-interest, and regional conferences. Thematic conferences were established during Eugenio Oñate's presidency, and the ECCM and ECFD series were consolidated under Ekkehard Ramm.

The ECCOMAS Young Investigators Conference is held biennially in odd-numbered years. Young researchers, supported by senior scientists, organize the conference, which targets PhD students, postdoctoral researchers, and scientists under 35. Previous editions have taken place in Aveiro (2012), Bordeaux (2013), Aachen (2015), Milan (2017), Kraków (2019), Valencia (2021), Porto (2023), and Pescara (2025). The ninth edition is scheduled for Turin from 8 to 10 September 2027.

ECCOMAS established the Olympiads to recognize distinguished postdoctoral researchers. The 2024 congress hosted the 14th PhD Olympiad.

== Awards ==
ECCOMAS confers three medals to established researchers, two awards to young scientists, and two awards for outstanding PhD theses.

=== Medals ===
The Walther Ritz–Boris Galerkin Medal is the highest distinction awarded by ECCOMAS. ECCOMAS presents it every four years at the Congress to honor sustained, outstanding contributions to computational methods in applied sciences. The Ludwig Prandtl Medal (for computational fluid dynamics) and the Leonhard Euler Medal (for computational solid and structural mechanics) are awarded biennially. An independent awards committee selects recipients, who must be members in good standing.

Laureates, 2008–2024:

Year	Ritz-Galerkin	Prandtl	Euler
2024	Alfio Quarteroni (Italy)	Remi Abgrall (Switzerland)	Ernst Rank (Germany)
2022	—	Harald van Brummelen (Netherlands)	Alfio Quarteroni (Italy)
2020	Eugenio Oñate (Spain)	Spencer Sherwin (UK)	Alessandro Reali (Italy)
2018	—	Ramon Codina (Spain)	Ekkehard Ramm (Germany)
2016	Franco Brezzi (Italy)	Wolfgang A. Wall (Germany)	Ferdinando Auricchio (Italy)
2014	—	Sergio Idelsohn (Argentina)	Franco Brezzi (Italy)
2012	Erwin Stein (Germany)	Roger Ohayon (France)	Herbert Mang (Austria)
2010	—	Ken Morgan (UK)	Bernhard Schrefler (Italy)
2008	Giulio Maier (Italy)	Antonio Huerta (Spain)	Peter Wriggers (Germany)

=== Young investigator awards ===
The Olgierd Cecil Zienkiewicz Award (for computational engineering sciences) and the Jacques-Louis Lions Award (for computational mathematics) are presented biennially at the Congress. Each award includes a diploma, complimentary registration, and a €2,000 prize. In 2024, Emilio Martínez-Pañeda received the Zienkiewicz Award and Walter Boscheri received the Lions Award.

=== PhD awards ===
Two PhD awards are presented annually. Each member association nominates one thesis, and a selection committee chooses two recipients. Each awardee receives a €2,000 prize and reimbursement of travel expenses.
