= Markus J. Buehler =

American materials scientist and engineer

- Markus J. Buehler (MIT)
- Born: 1977 (age 48–49)
- Citizenship: American
- Education: University of Stuttgart (undergraduate studies; PhD, 2004); Michigan Technological University (MS, 2001); Max Planck Institute for Metals Research (doctoral research)
- Known for: Artificial intelligence for science and engineering; computational materials science of biological materials, including collagen, silk, amyloids, intermediate filaments, and synthetic peptide materials; multiscale modeling; nanoscience and nanotechnology of carbon-based materials; materiomics; sonification and musical composition; science–art collaborations
- Awards: Materials Research Society Gold Graduate Student Award (2004); NSF CAREER Award (2007); U.S. Navy Young Investigator Award (2008); Air Force Office of Scientific Research Young Investigator Award (2008); DARPA Young Faculty Award (2008); Presidential Early Career Award for Scientists and Engineers (2009); MIT Harold E. Edgerton Faculty Achievement Award (2010); ASME Sia Nemat-Nasser Early Career Award (2010); Alfred Noble Prize (2011); ASME Thomas J. R. Hughes Young Investigator Award (2011); ASCE Leonardo da Vinci Award (2011); AIME Rossiter W. Raymond Memorial Award (2011); American Ceramic Society Stephen Brunauer Award (2011); Materials Research Society Outstanding Young Investigator Award (2012); Society of Engineering Science Young Investigator Medal (2012); IEEE Holm Conference Morton Antler Lecture Award (2012); TMS Robert Lansing Hardy Award (2013); TMS Structural Materials Division Best Paper Award (2013); ASME Journal of Applied Mechanics Award (2014); Fellow, American Institute for Medical and Biological Engineering (2015); Feynman Prize in Nanotechnology, theory (2015; announced 2016); NANOSMAT Outstanding Young Scientist Award (2016); Fellow, NANOSMAT (2016); International Journal of Applied Mechanics Most Cited Paper Award (2016); Clarivate Highly Cited Researcher; Materials Horizons Outstanding Paper award 2018; Daniel C. Drucker Medal (2021); MIT CEE Distinguished Service and Leadership Award (2021); Society of Engineering Science James R. Rice Medal (2022); International Association for Computational Mechanics Fellows Award (2022); Member, National Academy of Engineering (2023); Washington Award (2025); Fellow, Royal Society of Chemistry (2026); Gebhardt Distinguished Lectureship (2026)
- Scientific career
- Fields: Materials science; artificial intelligence; engineering science; mechanical engineering; biomechanics; solid mechanics; computational mechanics; biology; nanoscience; nanotechnology; physics; materiomics; sonification; musical composition; classical music
- Workplaces: Massachusetts Institute of Technology (CEE department head, 2013–2020); California Institute of Technology; Max Planck Institute for Metals Research
- Doctoral advisor: Huajian Gao William A. Goddard III
- Doctoral students: Sinan Keten; Denvid Lau; Steven Cranford; Zhao Qin; Shu-Wei Chang; Chia-Ching Chou; Tristan Giesa; Leon Dimas; Chun-Teh Chen; Anna Tarakanova; Grace Gu; Gang-Seob Jung
- Other notable students: Bo Ni; Seunghwa Ryu; Arun Nair; Jingjie Yeo; Zhiping Xu; Shangchao Lin; Shengjie Ling; Reza Mirzaeifar; Alfonso Gautieri; Raffaella Paparcone
- Website: Laboratory for Atomistic and Molecular Mechanics; MIT faculty profile

Markus J. Buehler (born 1977) is an engineer and materials scientist at the Massachusetts Institute of Technology (MIT), where he is the Jerry McAfee (1940) Professor of Engineering, with appointments in civil and environmental engineering, mechanical engineering, the Schwarzman College of Computing, and the Institute for Medical Engineering and Science (IMES). He directs the Laboratory for Atomistic and Molecular Mechanics. His research combines materials science, computational mechanics, and artificial intelligence to investigate the relationships between molecular structure, the organization of materials at different scales, and mechanical behavior.

His work has included the mechanics of silk, collagen, and bone; the design of bioinspired composites; and AI methods for materials discovery and protein design. He is also a composer of classical and experimental music and has investigated sonification as a way to represent molecular structures and spider webs through music. Buehler served as head of MIT's Department of Civil and Environmental Engineering from 2013 to 2020. He was elected to the National Academy of Engineering in 2023.

== Education and career ==
Buehler was born in 1977. He completed undergraduate studies in chemical and process engineering at the University of Stuttgart in 2000 and earned a master's degree in engineering mechanics at Michigan Technological University in 2001. He received a doctorate in chemistry, specializing in materials science, from the University of Stuttgart in 2004, conducting his research at the Max Planck Institute for Metals Research. His doctoral advisor was Huajian Gao.

From 2004 to 2005, he was a postdoctoral scholar and director of multiscale modeling and software integration at the California Institute of Technology's Materials and Process Simulation Center. His postdoctoral advisor was William A. Goddard III. He was a postdoctoral associate and lecturer at MIT from 2005 to 2006. He joined MIT's faculty in 2006, became a full professor in 2013, and was appointed to the McAfee professorship in 2015. His appointment in mechanical engineering began in 2021. He directed the MIT–Germany program from 2010 to 2023.

=== Department leadership ===
Buehler became head of MIT's Department of Civil and Environmental Engineering on July 1, 2013, succeeding Andrew Whittle. He served until 2020; Ali Jadbabaie succeeded him on September 1, 2020. During his tenure, his departmental work included faculty recruitment, undergraduate curriculum development, and the Rising Stars program for women considering academic careers. In 2021, the department recognized his contributions with its Distinguished Service and Leadership Award.

== Research ==
=== Fracture and multiscale mechanics ===
Buehler's research uses molecular and multiscale simulations to examine how chemical bonding and material structure affect deformation and fracture. The approach connects the behavior of atoms and molecules to larger structures, including protein assemblies and composite materials. In research published in 2006, he investigated how nonlinear elastic behavior near a crack tip affects the stability of a moving crack. The simulations related changes in crack propagation to local stiffening or softening of the material.

=== Biological and bioinspired materials ===
His work on collagen has examined how molecules assemble into fibrils and how their arrangement contributes to mechanical strength. A model reported in 2006 linked the geometry of collagen assemblies to their deformation and failure. Subsequent research on mineralized collagen examined the interactions between collagen and mineral components in bone, connecting the structure of the composite to its mechanical response.

He has also investigated how molecular changes associated with disease affect mechanical behavior. A 2009 study used atomistic and mesoscale models to examine how mutations associated with osteogenesis imperfecta alter collagen packing, intermolecular adhesion, and fibril strength. His work on amyloid materials has considered their mechanical properties in biological function, disease, and materials design.

In a 2010 study, Buehler and colleagues investigated how the small dimensions of beta-sheet crystals in silk affect their strength and toughness. Molecular simulations examined the role of hydrogen bonds and the confinement of the crystalline regions. A 2012 study considered the larger scale of spider webs. It showed how silk's nonlinear response to stretching, together with the arrangement of strands, allows damage to remain localized while other parts of a web continue to carry load.

The group has also combined computational modeling with 3D printing to test designs inspired by biological materials. In work reported in 2013, researchers fabricated composites with stiff and soft polymers arranged in patterns inspired by bone and nacre. Mechanical tests examined how the geometry of these components influenced resistance to fracture.

Buehler's research on mussel byssal threads, reported in 2013, examined how the distribution of stiff and compliant regions enables the threads to withstand wave-induced impacts. The study combined mechanical testing and modeling to investigate the performance of the attachment network.

His work has also applied biological design principles to filtration membranes. A 2017 study combined computational modeling with fabrication of layered membranes made from silk nanofibrils and hydroxyapatite. The arrangement of soft and rigid components was used to combine filtration, water transport, and structural support.

=== Architected materials and cement ===
In 2017, Buehler and colleagues studied porous, three-dimensional structures assembled from graphene sheets. The research combined atomistic simulations with tests of larger, 3D-printed models to investigate how curved, interconnected geometries affect strength and density. The work emphasized the contribution of structural geometry to mechanical performance.

He has also collaborated on molecular modeling of cement hydrates. A 2014 study examined how the ratio of calcium to silicon affects the organization and mechanical properties of the material that binds concrete. The calculations investigated compositions that could improve mechanical performance and reduce the amount of cement needed for a given application.

=== Mathematical representations of materials ===
Buehler's work has used the universality-diversity paradigm to examine how variations in the organization of a limited set of molecular building blocks produce different material functions. This approach relates the diversity of biological material properties to structural hierarchy and interactions among constituents.

Buehler has explored the use of category theory to describe relationships between structure and function. A 2011 study represented hierarchical protein materials using mathematical descriptions called ologs, and compared their organization with that of social networks. The method was proposed as a way to express and compare the roles of components in different systems.

== Artificial intelligence and materials design ==
In a 2020 interview with Machine Design, Buehler described artificial intelligence, virtual reality, and additive manufacturing as complementary approaches to multiscale materials design.

=== Machine learning for mechanical properties ===
Buehler's work on machine learning includes methods for predicting material behavior and designing structures to meet specified mechanical objectives. In 2017, his group combined machine learning with simulations, additive manufacturing, and experiments to design hierarchical composites. The approach used computed structure–property relationships to guide the search for arrangements of constituent materials.

In 2021, his group reported a generative adversarial network that estimated stress and strain fields from images of a material's internal structure. The model was trained on paired representations of microstructures and their mechanical responses, allowing it to approximate the results of more computationally intensive calculations within the studied setting.

His FieldPerceiver model, published in 2022, used an attention-based neural network to predict physical fields and material properties from descriptions of microstructure. A 2023 study applied an attention-based diffusion model to both property prediction and inverse design of hierarchical materials. It generated candidate structures for prescribed nonlinear mechanical responses, including different structures that met the same design objective, and evaluated them with simulations.

=== Language models, knowledge graphs, and scientific agents ===
MechGPT, described in 2024, adapted a large language model to questions in mechanics and materials science. The work investigated the use of information extracted from scientific sources, together with graph-based representations and retrieval, to connect concepts across length scales and research areas. Buehler has also studied knowledge graphs constructed from research literature as a means of identifying relationships between concepts that appear in different disciplines.

His group developed SciAgents, which combines a knowledge graph with multiple AI agents assigned different roles. The agents propose research hypotheses, develop possible methods, and critique the proposals. The system was demonstrated on materials-science research questions, including connections between biological structures and synthetic materials.

Other work has connected language-model agents to scientific software. MechAgents, published in 2024, organized agents to formulate elasticity problems, generate and run finite-element calculations, and revise solutions using execution results and feedback from other agents. The group's AtomAgents system, published in 2025, connects language-model agents to physics-based computational tools for alloy design. The agents coordinate tasks such as selecting calculations, running atomistic simulations, and analyzing material properties. The reported demonstrations concerned computational investigations of alloys.

Buehler's PRefLexOR framework (2025) investigated preference-based training and recursive revision of intermediate reasoning, with knowledge graphs providing context for scientific questions. In 2026, his group reported SparksMatter, a multi-agent system for computational inorganic-materials discovery that combines planning, scientific calculations, and critique in an iterative process. The study explored candidate materials for thermoelectric, semiconductor, and oxide applications.

=== Generative protein design ===
In 2024, Buehler's group reported ForceGen, a generative model that proposes protein sequences from specified mechanical unfolding responses. The model combines a protein language model with a diffusion-based approach, and its proposed sequences were evaluated using molecular simulations. Design targets included unfolding energy, strength, and force–extension behavior.

ProtAgents, also published in 2024, combined agents for retrieving information, analyzing protein structures, running physical simulations, and interpreting results. It was demonstrated on protein-design tasks that included calculating molecular vibrational properties.

In 2026, his group reported VibeGen, which generates protein sequences with specified patterns of motion. It combines a model that proposes sequences with another that predicts their dynamic behavior. The research treated protein motion as a design objective alongside structural considerations. The reported designs were evaluated computationally; experimental laboratory validation was described as future work.

== Music and art scholarship ==
Buehler has developed and used scientific methods to explore relationships between molecular structures, mechanical behavior, and musical composition; based on a framework referred to has materiomusic. In work reported in 2019, his group translated amino-acid vibrations into audible frequencies and represented protein sequences using a 20-tone scale. The researchers also used machine learning to generate variations in the musical representations and translate them back into proposed protein sequences.

He collaborated on Spider's Canvas, an interactive musical work based on a scanned three-dimensional spider web. The project was performed in connection with Tomás Saraceno's ON AIR exhibition at the Palais de Tokyo in Paris in 2018. Its instrument linked the geometry of web strands to sound and allowed performers to navigate a visual representation of the web.

In 2020, he created Viral Counterpoint of the Coronavirus Spike Protein (2019-nCoV), based on the amino-acid sequence and structure of the SARS-CoV-2 spike protein. Scores and audio are held in the Library of Congress's Performing Arts Response to COVID-19 Collection.

Further work in 2021 produced a virtual spider-web instrument. Users could explore the web visually and musically in a virtual-reality environment. In an interview on NPR's Morning Edition, he discussed translating the structure of spider webs into sound and investigating how spiders respond to vibrations.

His public presentations include the TED and TEDx talks If a virus could sing and Turning sound into matter, which discuss connections between molecular structures, sound, and materials design.

== Teaching and professional service ==
Buehler has taught engineering mechanics, atomistic modeling, and the application of machine learning to mechanics and materials. MIT OpenCourseWare publishes materials from Engineering Mechanics I, which he co-taught in 2007. His professional-education teaching has included multiscale materials design and machine learning for materials informatics. He has also organized mechanics and materials research camps for school students through U.S. Army educational-outreach programs.

He served as president of the Society of Engineering Science in 2019. He was appointed editor-in-chief of the Journal of the Mechanical Behavior of Biomedical Materials in January 2016. In 2019, the Materials Research Society appointed him editor of the new Impact section of MRS Bulletin, which publishes original research. He was also selected as a chair of the society's 2021 Fall Meeting.

His editorial service has included an editor-in-chief role at BioNanoScience and editorial positions with PLOS ONE, International Journal of Applied Mechanics, Journal of Engineering Mechanics, Journal of Nanomechanics and Micromechanics, Computational Materials Science, and Journal of the Royal Society Interface. His MIT faculty profile also lists editorial board service with APL Machine Learning, Biophysical Journal, and Extreme Mechanics Letters.

Buehler chaired the Biomechanics Committee of the American Society of Civil Engineers' Engineering Mechanics Institute from 2008 to 2014. He co-chaired the steering committee for ASME's NanoEngineering for Medicine and Biology Congress from 2010 to 2013 and served on the ASME Materials Division Executive Committee from 2015 to 2018.

=== Doctoral and postdoctoral mentoring ===
Former doctoral students include Sinan Keten, Denvid Lau, Steven Cranford, Zhao Qin, Shu-Wei Chang, Chia-Ching Chou, Tristan Giesa, Leon Dimas, Chun-Teh Chen, Anna Tarakanova, Grace Gu, and Gang-Seob Jung.

Researchers who trained in his laboratory as postdoctoral researchers include Bo Ni, Seunghwa Ryu, Arun Nair, Jingjie Yeo, Zhiping Xu, Shangchao Lin, Shengjie Ling, Reza Mirzaeifar, Alfonso Gautieri, and Raffaella Paparcone.

== Honors and recognition ==
Markus J. Buehler delivering a plenary lecture

=== Academy membership and fellowships ===
Buehler was elected to the National Academy of Engineering in 2023 for applying nanomechanics to the modeling and design of fracture-resistant bioinspired materials. He became a fellow of the American Institute for Medical and Biological Engineering in 2015 and of NANOSMAT in 2016, received the International Association for Computational Mechanics Fellows Award in 2022, and became a fellow of the Royal Society of Chemistry in 2026. He was an invited participant in the NAE Frontiers of Engineering symposium in 2007 and a plenary speaker in 2008 and 2013.

=== Awards and honors ===
- 2004 – Materials Research Society Gold Graduate Student Award.
- 2007 – NSF CAREER Award.
- 2008 – U.S. Navy Young Investigator Award, Air Force Office of Scientific Research Young Investigator Award, and DARPA Young Faculty Award.
- 2009 – Presidential Early Career Award for Scientists and Engineers.
- 2010 – MIT Harold E. Edgerton Faculty Achievement Award.
- 2010 – ASME Sia Nemat-Nasser Early Career Award.
- 2011 – Alfred Noble Prize
- 2011 – ASME Thomas J. R. Hughes Young Investigator Award and ASCE Leonardo da Vinci Award.
- 2011 – AIME Rossiter W. Raymond Memorial Award and American Ceramic Society Stephen Brunauer Award.
- 2012 – Materials Research Society Outstanding Young Investigator Award.
- 2012 – Society of Engineering Science Young Investigator Medal.
- 2012 – IEEE Holm Conference Morton Antler Lecture Award.
- 2013 – Robert Lansing Hardy Award.
- 2013 – TMS Structural Materials Division Best Paper Award.
- 2014 – ASME Journal of Applied Mechanics Award
- 2015 – Feynman Prize in Nanotechnology
- 2016 – NANOSMAT Outstanding Young Scientist Award.
- 2021 – Daniel C. Drucker Medal, American Society of Mechanical Engineers.
- 2021 – Distinguished Service and Leadership Award, MIT Department of Civil and Environmental Engineering.
- 2022 – James R. Rice Medal, Society of Engineering Science.
- 2025 – Washington Award, recognizing his work in computational modeling and biological-materials mechanics, engineering education, and academic leadership.
- 2026 – Gebhardt Distinguished Lectureship.

=== Citation metrics ===
He is a highly cited researcher, with an h-index of 130, and an i10-index of 524 as reported on his Google Scholar profile. He was named a Clarivate Highly Cited Researcher.

His MIT faculty profile also reports a position within the top 0.09 percent of researchers in nanoscience in a 2020 citation analysis.

== Selected publications ==
=== Books ===
- Buehler, Markus J., ed. (2008). Atomistic Modeling of Materials Failure. Springer. doi:10.1007/978-0-387-76426-9. ISBN 978-0-387-76425-2.
- Cranford, Steven W.; Buehler, Markus J. (2012). Biomateriomics. Springer. doi:10.1007/978-94-007-1611-7. ISBN 978-94-007-1610-0.

=== Research articles ===
- Buehler, Markus J.; Gao, Huajian (2006). "Dynamical fracture instabilities due to local hyperelasticity at crack tips". Nature. 439 (7074): 307–310. Bibcode:2006Natur.439..307B. doi:10.1038/nature04408. PMID 16421566.
- Keten, S.; Xu, Z.; Ihle, B.; Buehler, M. J. (2010). "Nanoconfinement controls stiffness, strength and mechanical toughness of β-sheet crystals in silk". Nature Materials. 9 (4): 359–367. Bibcode:2010NatMa...9..359K. doi:10.1038/nmat2704. PMID 20228820.
- Cranford, Steven W.; Tarakanova, Anna; Pugno, Nicola M.; Buehler, Markus J. (2012). "Nonlinear material behaviour of spider silk yields robust webs". Nature. 482 (7383): 72–76. Bibcode:2012Natur.482...72C. doi:10.1038/nature10739. PMID 22297972.
- Gu, Grace X.; Chen, Chun-Teh; Richmond, Deon J.; Buehler, Markus J. (2018). "Bioinspired hierarchical composite design using machine learning: simulation, additive manufacturing, and experiment". Materials Horizons. 5 (5): 939–945. doi:10.1039/C8MH00653A.
- Buehler, Markus J. (2024). "MechGPT, a Language-Based Strategy for Mechanics and Materials Modeling That Connects Knowledge Across Scales, Disciplines, and Modalities". Applied Mechanics Reviews. 76 (2) 021001. arXiv:2310.10445. Bibcode:2024ApMRv..76b1001B. doi:10.1115/1.4063843.
- Ghafarollahi, Alireza; Buehler, Markus J. (2025). "Automating alloy design and discovery with physics-aware multimodal multiagent AI". Proceedings of the National Academy of Sciences. 122 (4) e2414074122. Bibcode:2025PNAS..12214074G. doi:10.1073/pnas.2414074122. PMC 11789045. PMID 39854228.
