= Matthias Faes =

Belgian engineer and academic (born 1991)

Matthias G. R. Faes
- Born: 15 October 1991 (age 35); Lier, Belgium
- Education: KU Leuven
- Awards: ECCOMAS O. C. Zienkiewicz Award (2026); EASD Junior Research Prize (2023); IJAR Young Researcher Award (2019)
- Scientific career
- Fields: Reliability engineering, uncertainty quantification, computational mechanics
- Workplaces: TU Dortmund University; KU Leuven; Leibniz University Hannover
- Thesis: Interval methods for the identification and quantification of inhomogeneous uncertainty in Finite Element models (2017)
- Doctoral advisor: David Moens

Matthias G. R. Faes (born 15 October 1991) is a Belgian engineer and academic who works on uncertainty quantification and reliability engineering. Since February 2022 he has been a full professor at TU Dortmund University, where he heads the Chair for Reliability Engineering (CRE) in the Department of Mechanical Engineering.

== Early life and education ==
Faes was born in Lier, Belgium. He studied engineering technology at the De Nayer campus in Sint-Katelijne-Waver, obtaining a bachelor's degree in 2012 and a master's degree in engineering technology with a specialization in manufacturing engineering in 2013, which he completed summa cum laude.

He then carried out his doctoral research in the Department of Mechanical Engineering of KU Leuven under the supervision of David Moens. He obtained his PhD in engineering technology in 2017 with a dissertation on interval methods for the identification and quantification of inhomogeneous uncertainty in finite element models.

== Career ==
From 2013 to 2017 Faes worked as a scientific and teaching assistant at KU Leuven. After completing his doctorate he remained there as a postdoctoral researcher, from 2019 to 2022 as a postdoctoral fellow of the Research Foundation – Flanders (FWO). In 2020 he received a postdoctoral research fellowship from the Alexander von Humboldt Foundation, which he held at the Institute for Risk and Reliability of Leibniz University Hannover.

In February 2022 he was appointed full professor (W3) of Reliability Engineering at the Technical University of Dortmund.

== Research ==
Faes's research concerns computational methods for uncertainty quantification and reliability analysis of engineering structures and systems. The main areas of his work are positioned in the reliability analysis of complex structures, uncertainty quantification under scarce data and the extension of numerical models with scientific machine learning and artificial intelligence tools.

His doctoral and early postdoctoral work developed interval field methods, which represent spatially varying non-probabilistic uncertainty in finite element models, together with inverse methods to identify such uncertainty from measurement data. His later work addresses the efficient estimation of small failure probabilities, including first-passage problems in stochastic structural dynamics, Bayesian active learning with Gaussian process surrogate models, the propagation of imprecise probabilities such as probability boxes, and reliability-based design optimization of complex systems.

== Awards and honours ==
- 2018: ECCOMAS Award for the best PhD theses of 2017 on computational methods in applied sciences and engineering, one of two winners selected from 17 nominated theses.
- 2018: Second laureate of the award of the Belgian National Committee on Theoretical and Applied Mechanics for the best PhD thesis of 2017.
- 2019: IJAR Young Researcher Award of the International Symposium on Imprecise Probabilities: Theories and Applications (ISIPTA), shared with Arthur Van Camp.
- 2023: Junior Research Prize in the area of Development of Methodologies for Structural Dynamics of the European Association for Structural Dynamics (EASD).
- 2026: Olgierd Cecil Zienkiewicz Young Investigator Award of the European Community on Computational Methods in Applied Sciences (ECCOMAS), presented at the WCCM-ECCOMAS 2026 Congress in Munich.

== Professional service ==
Faes is an associate editor of the journals Reliability Engineering & System Safety and Mechanical Systems and Signal Processing, and associate managing editor of the ASCE-ASME Journal of Risk and Uncertainty in Engineering Systems.
