= Thomas J. R. Hughes =

American engineer

Thomas Joseph Robert Hughes
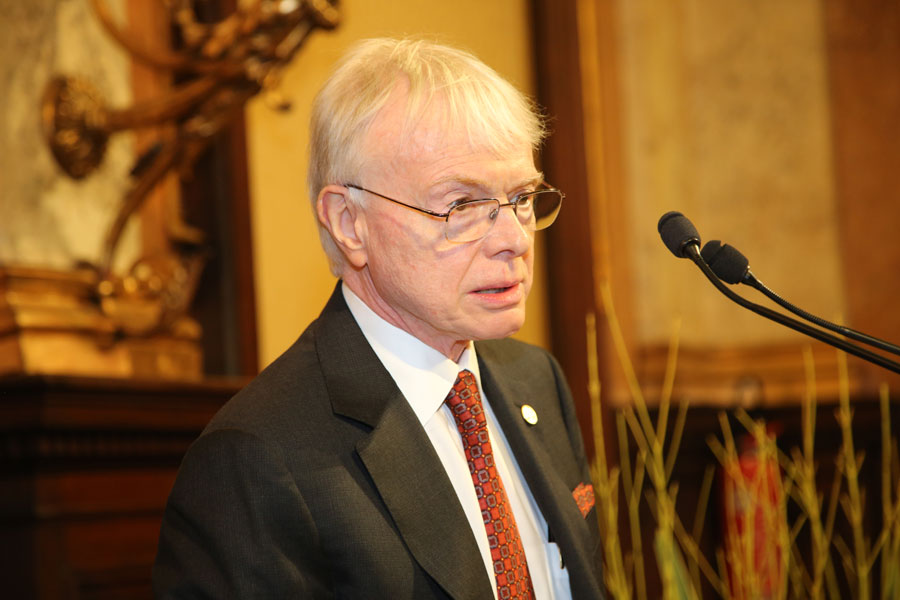
- Thomas J.R. Hughes 2014
- Born: July 25, 1943 (age 83)
- Education: Pratt Institute; University of California, Berkeley
- Known for: Computational mechanics Finite element method
- Awards: ASME Medal (2018); Timoshenko Medal (2007); Theodore von Karman Medal (2009); Society for Industrial and Applied Mechanic's (SIAM) Ralph E. Kleinman Prize (2021)
- Scientific career
- Fields: Computational mechanics Finite element method
- Workplaces: The University of Texas at Austin

Thomas Joseph Robert Hughes (born 1943) is a Professor of Aerospace Engineering and Engineering Mechanics and currently holds the Computational and Applied Mathematics Chair (III) at the Oden Institute for Computational Engineering and Sciences at The University of Texas at Austin. Hughes has been listed as an ISI Highly Cited Author in Engineering by the ISI Web of Knowledge, Thomson Scientific Company.

A leading expert in computational mechanics, Hughes has received numerous academic distinctions and awards for his work. He is a research fellow of the National Academy of Sciences, National Academy of Engineering, American Academy of Arts & Sciences, the American Academy of Mechanics, the American Society of Mechanical Engineers (ASME), the U.S. Association for Computational Mechanics (USACM), the International Association for Computational Mechanics (IACM), the American Association for the Advancement of Science, and has been elected as a foreign member of The Royal Society. He is a founder and past President of USACM and IACM, and past chairman of the Applied Mechanics Division of ASME.

== Career ==
Hughes began his career as a mechanical design engineer at Grumman Aerospace, subsequently joining General Dynamics as a research and development engineer. After receiving his Ph.D. from University of California, Berkeley, he joined the Berkeley faculty, eventually moving to California Institute of Technology. He then moved to Stanford University before joining The University of Texas at Austin. At Stanford, he served as chairman of the Division of Applied Mechanics, chairman of the Department of Mechanical Engineering, and chairman of the Division of Mechanics and Computation, where Hughes occupied the Mary and Gordon Crary Chair of Engineering. While at Stanford, he served as a member of International Advisory Committee, ICTACEM (2001).

Hughes has developed computational methods for understanding solid, structural and fluid mechanics. He recently has applied this expertise to develop customized models of blood flow for patients using their individual imaging records such as CT scans and MRIs.

Hughes was elected to the National Academy of Engineering in 1995 for contributions to the development of finite element methods for solid-structural and fluid mechanics.

== Books ==
- Thomas J. R. Hughes and Jerrold E. Marsden, A Short Course in Fluid Mechanics, Mathematics lecture series, v. 6, Boston: Publish or Perish, 1976.
- Thomas J. R. Hughes, D. Gartling, Robert L. Spilker, Applied Mechanics Division, Vol. 44: New Concepts in Finite Element Analysis, ASME, 1981.
- Thomas J. R. Hughes, A. Pifko, A. Jay, Applied Mechanics Division, Vol. 48: Nonlinear Finite Element Analysis of Plates and Shells, ASME, 1981.
- Thomas J. R. Hughes, Stress-point algorithm for a pressure-sensitive multiple-yield-surface plasticity theory, Unknown Binding, Available from National Technical Information Service, 1982.
- Computational methods for transient analysis, edited by Ted Belytschko and Thomas J.R. Hughes, Computational methods in mechanics, Volume 1: Mechanics and mathematical methods, New York: Elsevier Science Pub. Co., 1983.
- Thomas J. R. Hughes and Englewood Cliffs, The finite element method: linear static and dynamic finite element analysis, NJ: Prentice-Hall, (1987), 1985.
- Thomas J. R. Hughes, Ernest Hinton. Finite Element Methods for Plate and Shell Structures, Volume 1: Element Technology, Pineridge Press Ltd, 1986.
- Thomas J. R. Hughes, Ernest Hinton. Finite Element Methods for Plate and Shell Structures, Volume 2: Formulation and Algorithms, Pineridge Press Ltd, 1986.
- Jerrold E. Marsden and Thomas J. R. Hughes, Mathematical Foundations of Elasticity, Dover Publications, 1994.
- J.C. Simo and T.J.R. Hughes, Interdisciplinary applied mathematics, Volume 7: Computational inelasticity, New York: Springer, 1998.
- Thomas J. R. Hughes, The Finite Element Method: Linear Static and Dynamic Finite Element Analysis, Dover Publications, 2000.
- Erwin Stein, René de Borst, Thomas J.R. Hughes, Encyclopedia of Computational Mechanics, Volume 1: Fundamentals, Wiley, 2004.
- Erwin Stein, René de Borst, Thomas J.R. Hughes, Encyclopedia of Computational Mechanics, Volume 2: Solids and Structures, Wiley, 2004.
- Erwin Stein, René de Borst, Thomas J.R. Hughes, Encyclopedia of Computational Mechanics, Volume 3: Fluids, Wiley, 2004.
- J. Austin Cottrell, Thomas J. R. Hughes, Yuri Bazilevs, Isogeometric Analysis: Toward Integration of CAD and FEA, Wiley, 2009.

== Awards and honors ==
- Hughes has received several awards, including the Walter L. Huber Civil Engineering Research Prize from ASCE, the Melville Medal from ASME, the Computational Mechanics Award from the Japan Society of Mechanical Engineers, the von Neumann Medal from USACM and the Gauss-Newton Medal from IACM.
- In 1995 he was elected a member of the National Academy of Engineering
- In 1998 he was awarded the Worcester Reed Warner Medal and in 2007 the Timoshenko Medal, both by ASME.
- In 2007 he was awarded an honorary degree by the University of Pavia, Italy.
- In 2009 he was awarded an honorary doctorate by the Norwegian University of Science and Technology (NTNU).
- In 2011 he was elected a Foreign Member of the Royal Society.
- On June 21, 2013, Professor T.J.R. Hughes has named Doctor Honoris Causa from Escuela Técnica Superior Engenieros de Caminos, Canales y Puertos (E.T.S.I.C.C.P), at University of A Coruña (U.D.C) - Spain, into the ambit of Civil Engineering for his contributions in computational mechanics.
- In 2020 he was awarded the Eringen Medal of the Society of Engineering Science.
- In 2021 he was inducted as an Honorary Member into the Japan Association for Computational Mechanics (JACM).
- In 2021 he was awarded the Society for Industrial and Applied Mechanic's (SIAM) Ralph E. Kleinman Prize.
- In 2024 he was awarded an honorary doctorate by National Institute of Applied Sciences (INSA) Lyon, France.

== Videos ==
- Together with the Texas Advanced Computing Center, he developed the video "Simulating Patient-specific Nanoparticulate Drug Delivery for the Treatment of Vulnerable Plaques".
