= John Argyris =

Greek pioneer of computer applications

- Born: Johann Hadjiargyris; 19 August 1913; Volos, Greece
- Died: 2 April 2004 (aged 90); Stuttgart, Germany
- Education: National Technical University of Athens; Technical University of Munich; ETH Zurich
- Known for: Finite element method
- Awards: Theodore von Karman Medal (1975); FRS (1986)
- Scientific career
- Workplaces: Imperial College London; University of Stuttgart

Johann Hadjiargyris FRS (Greek: Ιωάννης Χατζιαργύρης; 19 August 1913 – 2 April 2004) was a Greek pioneer of computer applications in science and engineering, among the creators of the finite element method (FEM), and later Professor at the University of Stuttgart and Director of the Institute of Structural Mechanics and Dynamics in Aerospace Engineering.

== Education ==
He was born in Volos, Greece but the family moved to Athens where he was educated in the Classical Gymnasium.

He studied civil engineering for four years at the National Technical University of Athens and then at the Technische Hochschule München (now Technical University of Munich), receiving his Engineering Diploma in 1936.

Following his escape from Nazi Germany he completed his Doctorate at ETH Zurich in 1942.

== Career ==
His first job was at the Gollnow company in Stettin, where he was involved among other things in high radio transmitter masts. In 1943, he joined the research department of the Royal Aeronautical Society in England. Starting from 1949 he was lecturer in aeronautical engineering at the Imperial College London of the University of London, where he assumed a chair in 1955.

In 1959, Argyris was appointed a professor at the Technische Hochschule in Stuttgart (today University of Stuttgart) and director of the Institute of Structural Mechanics and Dynamics in Aerospace Engineering. He created the Aeronautical and Astronautical Campus of the University of Stuttgart as focal point for applications of digital computers and electronics.

Argyris was involved in and developed to a large extent the Finite Element Method along with Ray William Clough and Olgierd Zienkiewicz after an early mathematical pre-working of Richard Courant.

== Awards and honours ==
Argyris was awarded the Royal Aeronautical Society Silver Medal in 1971 and an honorary Doctorate of Science in Maths from Athens University in 1989.

He was elected a Fellow of the Royal Society in March 1986. His nomination reads:

Professor Argyris commenced his scientific career at Imperial College in 1949 and subsequently accepted in 1959 a joint appointment as Professor at Imperial College and Professor and Director of the Institute of Astronautical Structures at Stuttgart. Professor Argyris pioneered in the United Kingdom and Europe computer mechanics and established in the early 1950s the matrix structural theory introducing the first finite elements concepts including effects of material and geometrical nonlinearities. This work initiated an explosive development of computational mechanics which is still an expanding area. In this field he continued without interruption as one of the leading figures and published a prodigious number of papers (over 300) ranging in applications from structural problems through fluid mechanics, lubrication, celestial mechanics. The computer system ASKA developed under his direction was the model for many subsequent industrial developments. Professor Argyris has been honoured abroad by a great number of distinctions including the Theodore von Karman Medal, Timoshenko Medal [sic] (ASME), I. B. Laskowitz Gold Medal in Astronautics (N.Y. Acad. Of Sc.) and Copernicus Medal (Polish Acad. Of Sc.).

== Personal life ==
When World War II started Argyris was in Berlin at the Technische Hochschule (now Technische Universität Berlin). He was arrested and accused of passing research secrets to the Allies. He was saved from execution by Admiral Canaris (thought to be of Greek descent, he was not) who arranged his escape. After swimming the Rhine during an air-raid, he made his way to Switzerland. There he entered ETH Zurich to complete his Doctorate.

Argyris died in Stuttgart and is buried in the Sankt Jörgens Cemetery in the city of Varberg, Sweden.

His mother's uncle, Constantin Carathéodory, was a Greek mathematician of the Modern Era.
