= J. Tinsley Oden =

American engineer (1936–2023)

John Tinsley Oden
- Born: December 25, 1936; Alexandria, Louisiana, U.S.
- Died: August 27, 2023 (aged 86)
- Education: Louisiana State University; Oklahoma State University
- Known for: Finite Element Method
- Awards: Eringen Medal (1989); Theodore von Kármán Medal (1992); Timoshenko Medal (1996); Honda Prize (2013)
- Scientific career
- Fields: Computational mechanics
- Workplaces: Oklahoma State University; The University of Alabama in Huntsville; The University of Texas at Austin
- Doctoral students: J. N. Reddy

John Tinsley Oden (December 25, 1936 – August 27, 2023) was an American engineer. He was the Associate Vice President for Research, the Cockrell Family Regents' Chair in Engineering #2, the Peter O'Donnell, Jr. Centennial Chair in Computing Systems, a Professor of Aerospace Engineering and Engineering Mechanics, a Professor of Mathematics, and a Professor of Computer Science at The University of Texas at Austin. Oden has been listed as an ISI Highly Cited Author in Engineering by the ISI Web of Knowledge, Thomson Scientific Company.

Oden was the founding director of the Oden Institute for Computational Engineering and Sciences, which was started in January 2003 as an expansion of the Texas Institute for Computational and Applied Mathematics (TICAM), also directed by Oden for over a decade. The Oden Institute, formerly known as ICES, was named in his honor in 2019.

Oden earned a B.S. degree in civil engineering from LSU in 1959. Oden earned a PhD in engineering mechanics from Oklahoma State University in 1962. He taught at OSU and The University of Alabama in Huntsville, where he was the head of the Department of Engineering Mechanics prior to going to Texas in 1973. He has held visiting professor positions at other universities in the United States, England, and Brazil.

An author of over 500 scientific publications: books, book chapters, conference papers, and monographs, he is an editor of the series, Finite Elements in Flow Problems and of Computational Methods in Nonlinear Mechanics. He has published extensively in this field and in related areas over the last three decades.

Oden died on August 27, 2023, at the age of 86.

== Honors and awards ==
Oden was an Honorary Member of the American Society of Mechanical Engineers and was a Fellow of six international scientific/technical societies: IACM, AAM, ASME, ASCE, SES, and BMIA. He was a Fellow, founding member, and first President of the U.S. Association for Computational Mechanics and the International Association for Computational Mechanics. He was a Fellow and past President of both the American Academy of Mechanics and the Society of Engineering Science. Oden was awarded the A. Cemal Eringen Medal in 1989, the Worcester Reed Warner Medal, the Lohmann Medal, the Theodore von Karman Medal, the John von Neumann medal, the Newton/Gauss Congress Medal, and the Stephan P. Timoshenko Medal. He was also knighted as “Chevalier des Palmes Academiques” by the French government and he held four honorary doctorates, honoris causa, from universities in Portugal (Technical University of Lisbon), Belgium (Faculte Polytechnique), Poland (Cracow University of Technology), and the United States (Presidential Citation, The University of Texas at Austin). Oden was also elected a member of the U.S. National Academy of Engineering in 1988 for pioneering work in computational mechanics, which significantly advanced the transformation of nonlinear continuum mechanics into a powerful and widely used engineering tool.

== Books ==
- Finite Elements of Nonlinear Continua, Dover Publications, 2006.
- An Introduction to the Mathematical Theory of Finite Elements, with J. N. Reddy, John Wiley & Sons Inc., 1976.
- Applied Functional Analysis, Prentice Hall, 1979.
- Mechanics of Elastic Structures, 2nd ed., with E. A. Ripperger, McGraw-Hill Inc., 1981.
- Finite Elements an Introduction, volume 1, with E. B. Becker and G. F. Carey, 1981.
- Finite Elements in Fluids, volume 2, with O. C. Zienkiewicz, R. H. Gallagher, and C. Taylor, John Wiley & Sons, New York, 1976.
- Finite Elements in Fluids, volume 4 with R. H. Gallagher, D. N. Norrie, and O. C. Zienkiewicz, Wiley, Chichester, 1982.
- Finite Elements in Fluids, volume 6, with R. H. Gallagher, G. F. Carey, and O.C. Zienkiewicz, Wiley, Chichester, 1985.
- State of the Art Survey in Computational Fluid Mechanics, with A. K. Noor, ASME, 1988.
- Computational Methods in Nonlinear Mechanics, North-Holland, Amsterdam, 1980.
