= Ernest Hinton =

British engineer and professor (1946–1999)

- Ernest Hinton
- Born: 16 March 1946; Liverpool, UK
- Died: 18 November 1999; Swansea, UK
- Education: University of Wales Swansea
- Known for: Computational mechanics
- Scientific career
- Fields: Civil Engineering
- Doctoral advisor: John Davies

Ernest Hinton (16 March 1946 – 18 November 1999) was a British civil engineer and engineering professor. He was born in Liverpool, England in 1946 and was educated at University of Wales Swansea. After receiving the BSc (1967), MSc (1968) and PhD (1971) at Swansea he joined the faculty of the Department of Civil Engineering where served until his death in 1999.

== Career ==
Ernest Hinton received the BSc Honours in Civil Engineering at Swansea in 1967. His studies at Wales continued with the award of the MSc in 1968 (Least squares analysis using finite elements.), and the PhD in 1971 (Design of reinforced concrete slabs.). In recognition of his many contributions to his field of research he was awarded the D.Sc. in 1988. In 1989 he was also awarded a personal chair in recognition of his world class research. Dr. Hinton was a Charted Civil Engineer (C.Eng.), Member of the British Computer Society (M.B.C.S.) and Member of the Institution of Structural Engineers (M.I.Struct.E.).

== Contributions ==
One of the early pioneers of the finite element method and computational mechanics, Prof. Hinton had an extremely prolific career. His early paper with Professor Bruce Irons (1968) was titled "Least squares smoothing of experimental data using finite elements" and proved to be the beginning of a career in computational mechanics at Swansea. He went on to supervise the doctoral research of over 40 students many of whom choose to join diverse universities and continue the work begun with Prof Hinton. In addition he published around 250 journal and conference papers and was author, coauthor or editor of more than ten books.

In recounting the significance of Hinton's work on structural topology optimisation, Akin and Arjona-Baez wrote "Like several of his colleagues at the University of Wales, Swansea Prof. Hinton made significant contributions to the field of engineering computations. He was among the first to be concerned with reducing the error in a FEA (Finite Element Analysis) and with quantifying overall and local errors." He and colleagues continued to make notable contributions to the emerging computational mechanics field led at Swansea by O. C. Zienkiewicz. Especially significant are the series of books he coauthored with D. R. J. Owen, one of the most widely respected and referenced of these is the 1980 book "Finite Elements in Plasticity". Professors Hinton and Owen also collaborated to edit 17 international conference proceedings and together with Prof. K. J. Bathe were chief editors of the journal "Engineering Computations".

Of his many journal papers a series of three on the subject of homogenisation and topology optimisation published together with B. Hassani in 1998 in "Computers and Structures" have been extremely influential and widely cited.

Ernest Hinton died in Swansea in 1999 at the age of 53 after a protracted illness.

== Books ==
Hinton, E.; Owen, D. R. (1977), Finite element programming, Academic Press, pp. 305 p

Hinton, E.; Owen, D. R. J. (1980), A simple guide to finite elements, Pineridge Pubs, pp. 136 p

Owen, D. R.; Hinton, E. (1980), Finite elements in plasticity: theory and practice, Pineridge Pubs, pp. 594 p

Hinton, E.; Owen, D. R. (1981), An introduction to finite element computations, Pineridge Pubs, pp. 385 p

Hinton, Ernest; Owen, D. R. J.; Taylor, Cedric (1982), Recent advances in non-linear computational mechanics, Pineridge Press, pp. 277 p

Smith, Alan A.; Hinton, E.; Lewis, Roland W. (1983), Civil engineering systems analysis and design, John Wiley & Sons, pp. 473 p

Lewis, R. W.; Bettess, P.; Hinton, E. (1984), Numerical methods in coupled systems, John Wiley & Sons, pp. 618 p

Hinton, E.; Owen, D. R. J. (1984), Finite element software for plates and shells, Pineridge Pubs

Hinton, E.; Owen, D. R. J. (1986), Computational modelling of reinforced concrete structures, Pineridge Pubs, pp. 384 p

Hinton, Ernest; Hughes, Thomas J. R. (Editors) (1986), Finite Element Methods for Plate and Shell Structures, Volume 2: Element Technology, Pineridge Pubs, p. 445

Hinton, Ernest; Hughes, Thomas J. R. (Editors) (1986), Finite Element Methods for Plate and Shell Structures, Volume 2: Formulations and Algorithms, Pineridge Pubs, p. 400

Hinton, Ernest, ed. (1987), Numerical Methods and Software for Dynamic Analysis of Plates and Shells, Pineridge Pubs, pp. 550 p

Hassani, Behrooz; Hinton, Ernest (1999), Homogenization and Structural Topology Optimization: Theory, Practice and Software, Springer, pp. 268 p

Hinton, Ernest; Sienz, Johann; Özakca, Mustafa (2003), Analysis and Optimization of Prismatic and Axisymmetric Shell Structures: Theory, Practice and Software, Springer, pp. 496 p
