= Perugia (disambiguation) =

Perugia is a city in central Italy, the capital of Umbria.

Perugia may also refer to:

== Art, entertainment, and media ==
- Cippus of Perugia, a stone tablet bearing an Etruscan inscription
- "From Perugia", a poem by American Quaker poet John Greenleaf Whittier
- Perugia (album), a 1974 jazz album by American pianist Roland Hanna
- Polyptych of Perugia, a Renaissance painting by Italian artist Piero della Francesca

== Military ==
- 151 Infantry Division Perugia, an Italian infantry division of World War II
- Battle of Perugia, an ancient Roman battle

== People ==
- André Perugia (1893-1977), French shoe designer
- Andrew of Perugia (died c. 1332), Franciscan friar and bishop
- Constantius of Perugia (died c. 170 AD), Christian martyr, bishop, and saint
- Giannicolo da Perugia (c. 1460–1544), Italian painter during the Renaissance
- Herculanus of Perugia (died 549 AD), bishop of Perugia and Christian martyr
- Ilaria Perugia (born 1969), Italian mathematician
- John of Perugia and Peter of Sassoferrato (13th century), Franciscan friars
- Matteo da Perugia (fl. 1400–1416), Medieval Italian composer
- Niccolò da Perugia (fl. 14th century), Italian composer of the "ars nova"
- Paul of Perugia (14th century), Italian mythographer
- Vincenzo Peruggia (1881–1925), the man who stole the Mona Lisa

== Places ==
- Duchy of Perugia, a duchy in the Italian part of the Byzantine Empire
- Province of Perugia, Umbria, Italy

== Other uses ==
- A.C. Perugia Calcio, an Italian football (soccer) club based in Perugia
- Cippus of Perugia, a stone tablet discovered near Perugia, Italy, in 1822
- Perugia Cathedral, Perugia, Italy
- Perugia Press, an American poetry press
- Perugia's limia, a small fish of the family Poeciliidae
- University of Perugia, Perugia, Italy
