= Ted Belytschko =

American mechanical engineer (1943–2014)

Ted Bohdan Belytschko
- Born: 13 January 1943
- Died: 15 September 2014 (aged 71)
- Education: Illinois Institute of Technology
- Awards: William Prager Medal (2011); John von Neumann Medal (2001); Timoshenko Medal (2001)
- Scientific career
- Workplaces: Northwestern University
- Thesis: Numerical methods for the limit analysis of plates (1968)
- Doctoral advisor: Philip Gibson Hodge

Ted Bohdan Belytschko (January 13, 1943 – September 15, 2014) was an American mechanical engineer. He was Walter P. Murphy Professor and McCormick Professor of Computational Mechanics at Northwestern University. He worked in the field of computational solid mechanics and was known for development of methods like element-free Galerkin method and the Extended finite element method.

Belytschko received his B.S. in Engineering Sciences (1965) and his Ph.D. in Mechanics (1968) from the Illinois Institute of Technology. He was named in ISI Database as the fourth most cited engineering researcher in January 2004. He was also the editor of the International Journal for Numerical Methods in Engineering. He died at the age of 71 on September 15, 2014.

== Awards and honors ==
- William Prager Medal, 2011.
- Member of the National Academy of Sciences (2011)
- Member of the National Academy of Engineering (1992)
- John von Neumann Medal of the United States Association for Computational Mechanics (2001)
- Timoshenko Medal of the American Society of Mechanical Engineers (2001)
- Fellow of the American Academy of Arts and Sciences (2002)
- Gauss Newton Medal of the International Association for Computational Mechanics (2002)
- Theodore von Karman Medal, 1999.
