= Paola Antonietti =

Italian applied mathematician (born 1980)

Paola F. Antonietti (born 1980) is an Italian applied mathematician and numerical analyst whose research concerns numerical methods for partial differential equations, and particularly domain decomposition methods, with applications in scientific computing and Applied Sciences such as the computational modelling of neurodegenerative disorders and simulating the propagation of seismic waves. She is Professor of Numerical Analysis at the Polytechnic University of Milan.

== Education and career ==
Antonietti was born in 1980 in Milan. She earned a laurea cum laude from the University of Pavia in 2003, and continued there for a Ph.D. in 2007. Her dissertation, Domain decomposition, spectral correctness and numerical testing of discontinuous Galerkin methods, was jointly supervised by Annalisa Buffa and Ilaria Perugia, and included time as a visiting student at the University of Oxford.

After postdoctoral research at the University of Nottingham, she returned to Italy as a tenure-track assistant professor in the Polytechnic University of Milan in 2008. She was given tenure as an associate professor in 2015, promoted to full professor in 2019, and was appointed head of the Laboratory of Modeling and Scientific Computing (MOX) by Irene Sabadini in 2023.

== Recognition ==
As a student, Antonietti won the S. Cinquini and M. Cinquini Cibrario Prize of the University of Pavia.

In 2008, the Italian Society for Industrial Applications of Mathematics (SIMAI) gave her their F. Saleri prize, and she was the winner of the 2015 SIMAI prize.

In 2020, the European Community on Computational Methods in Applied Sciences (ECCOMAS) gave her their Jacques-Louis Lions award.

She is the recipient of the “NEMESIS” ERC SYNERGY grant 2023.
