= Centro de Investigación de Métodos Computacionales =

Research institute in Santa Fe, Argentina

Coordinates: 31.634505°S 60.671054°W

Centro de Investigación de Métodos Computacionales (CIMEC, Research Center for Computational Methods) is a research institute located at Predio CONICET Santa Fe Santa Fe, Argentina.

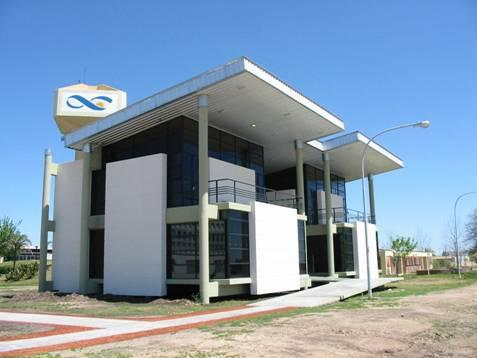
View of CIMEC's building

It depends on the Universidad Nacional del Litoral, and on the National Scientific and Technical Research Council (CONICET). The main area of research is Computational mechanics, i.e. the application of numerical methods to various areas of engineering.

The center was formerly known as Centro Internacional de Métodos Computacionales en Ingeniería.

Additional information in the official site below.
