= Clemens van Blitterswijk =

Dutch scientist

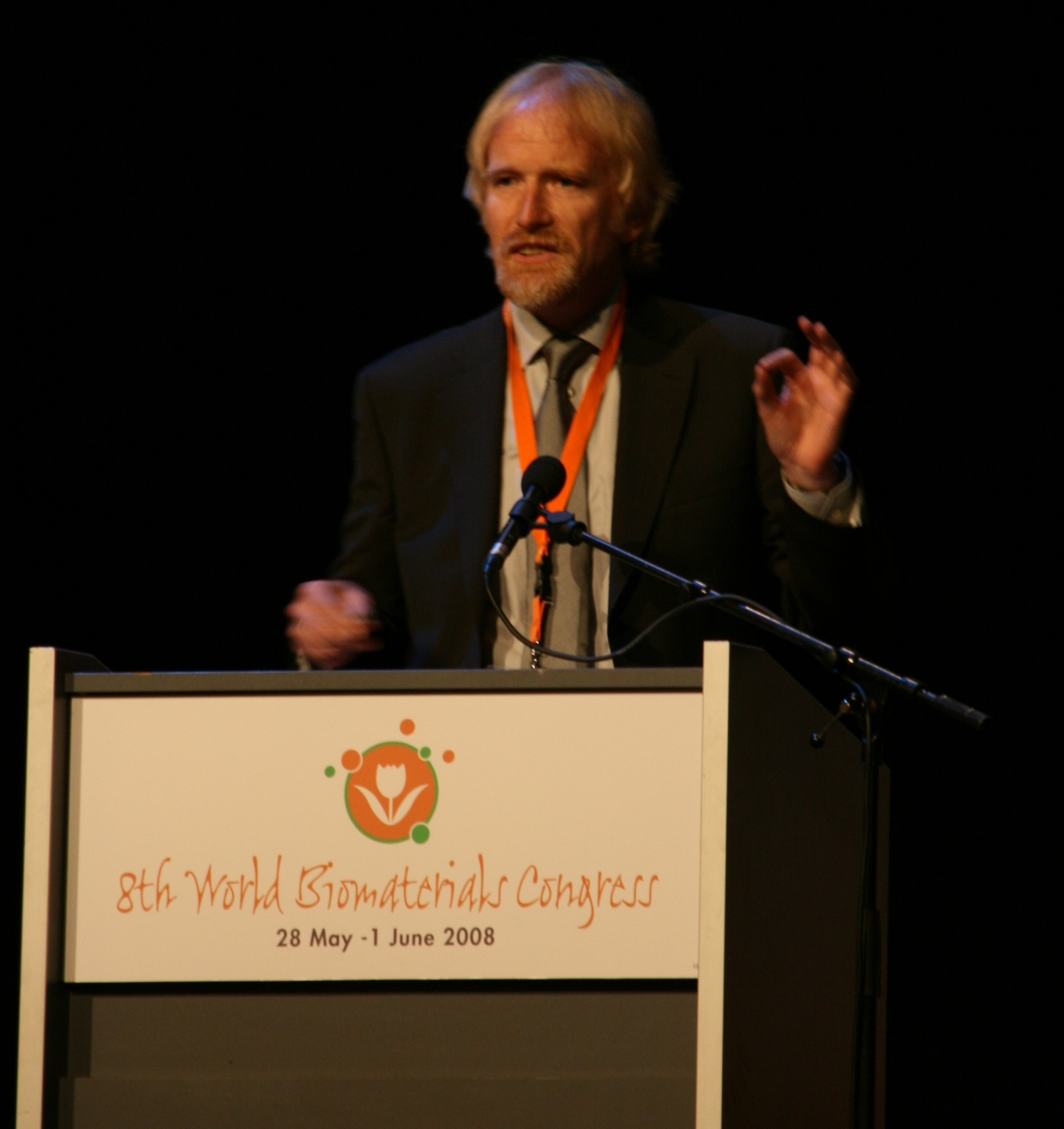
- Clemens van Blitterswijk
- Born: 1957 (age 68–69); The Hague, Netherlands
- Education: University of Leiden
- Awards: Jean Leray Award; The Marie Parijs Award; The Klein Award; George Winter Award; Huibregtsen Prize; Career Achievement Award;
- Scientific career
- Fields: Biomedical engineering, biomaterials, tissue engineering
- Workplaces: University of Maastricht

Clemens A. van Blitterswijk (1957, The Hague) is a Dutch tissue engineer who contributed to the use of biomaterials to heal bone injuries, especially using osteoinductive ceramics. In collaboration with Jan de Boer and others, he has contributed to screening microtextures to study cell-biomaterial interactions, an approach termed materiomics.

== Career ==
Blitterswijk graduated from a bachelor in cell biology at Leiden University and defended his PhD thesis in 1985 at the same university on artificial ceramic middle ear implants under the supervision of Professor Jan Grote and Klaas de Groot, for which he was awarded the Jean Leray young scientist award from the European Society for Biomaterials in 1987. From 1985 to 1996, he worked on hydroxyapatite biomaterials for middle ear implants under the mentorship of Jan Grote and Klaas De Groot at Leiden University.

In 1996, he left Leiden University and co-founded, together with Klaas De Groot, IsoTis BV, a life sciences company focused on bone biomaterials and tissue engineering.

In 1997, he became a professor at University of Twente. Later, he was appointed director of the University of Twente's MIRA Institute for Biomedical Technology and Technical Medicine institute (the institute no longer exists). In collaboration with Jan de Boer, Hemant Unadkat, and Dimitrios Stamatialis, he contributed to the development of a high-throughput assay to design and select micrometer-scale surface textures that could enhance specific biological functions (TopoChip).

In 2012, he became a partner of the Life Science Partner (LSP) private investment firm where he invests in private companies and startups related to healthcare innovations.

In 2014, he became a distinguished professor at Maastricht University. Until 2018, he was the director and department chair at the MERLN Institute at Maastricht University. In 2015, he was awarded an ERC Advanced grant that aimed at developing microfabricated and microfluidic cell culture platforms for improving organoids. The conception of this grant application and the research relative to it were done by several principal investigators at Maastricht University.

== Valorization ==
He has served as CEO of IsoTis., a company that underwent an Initial Public Offering and was subsequently acquired by Integra LifeSciences. In 2018, he became the chairman of the board of directors of Kuros Biosciences.

== Teaching ==
Blitterswijk has been the official supervisor of over 80 PhD candidates who, in their large majority, have worked in the laboratories of other faculty members. He has participated as an editor of four textbooks, including one dedicated to tissue engineering.

== Awards ==
- Jean Leray award in 1989 for the work in his PhD thesis
- Professor de Kleijn award in 1989 for the work in his PhD thesis
- George Winter senior scientist award in 1997
- Federa award in 2012
- "Most entrepreneurial scientist" award in 2012
- Career Achievement award of the EU Chapter of the Tissue Engineering and Regenerative Medicine International Society in 2013
- Huibregtsen award in 2015
- ESB Klaas de Groot award in 2021

== Ten outstanding publications as a co-author or corresponding author ==
- Levenberg S, Rouwkema J, Macdonald M, Garfein ES, Kohane DS, Darland DC, Marini R, van Blitterswijk CA, Mulligan RC, D'Amore PA, Langer R (July 2005). "Engineering vascularized skeletal muscle tissue" (PDF). Nature Biotechnology. 23 (7): 879–84. doi:10.1038/nbt1109. PMID 15965465. S2CID 28136064.
- Moroni L, de Wijn JR, van Blitterswijk CA (March 2006). "3D fiber-deposited scaffolds for tissue engineering: influence of pores geometry and architecture on dynamic mechanical properties" (PDF). Biomaterials. 27 (7): 974–85. doi:10.1016/j.biomaterials.2005.07.023. PMID 16055183.
- Rouwkema J, de Boer J, Van Blitterswijk CA (September 2006). "Endothelial cells assemble into a 3-dimensional prevascular network in a bone tissue engineering construct" (PDF). Tissue Engineering. 12 (9): 2685–93. doi:10.1089/ten.2006.12.2685. PMID 16995802.
- Meijer GJ, de Bruijn JD, Koole R, van Blitterswijk CA (February 2007). "Cell-based bone tissue engineering". PLOS Medicine. 4 (2) e9. doi:10.1371/journal.pmed.0040009. PMC 1800310. PMID 17311467.
- Jukes JM, Both SK, Leusink A, Sterk LM, van Blitterswijk CA, de Boer J (May 2008). "Endochondral bone tissue engineering using embryonic stem cells". Proceedings of the National Academy of Sciences of the United States of America. 105 (19): 6840–5. Bibcode:2008PNAS..105.6840J. doi:10.1073/pnas.0711662105. PMC 2374550. PMID 18467492.
- Yuan H, Fernandes H, Habibovic P, de Boer J, Barradas AM, de Ruiter A, Walsh WR, van Blitterswijk CA, de Bruijn JD (August 2010). "Osteoinductive ceramics as a synthetic alternative to autologous bone grafting". Proceedings of the National Academy of Sciences of the United States of America. 107 (31): 13614–9. Bibcode:2010PNAS..10713614Y. doi:10.1073/pnas.1003600107. PMC 2922269. PMID 20643969.
- Unadkat HV, Hulsman M, Cornelissen K, Papenburg BJ, Truckenmüller RK, Carpenter AE, Wessling M, Post GF, Uetz M, Reinders MJ, Stamatialis D, van Blitterswijk CA, de Boer J (October 2011). "An algorithm-based topographical biomaterials library to instruct cell fate". Proceedings of the National Academy of Sciences of the United States of America. 108 (40): 16565–70. Bibcode:2011PNAS..10816565U. doi:10.1073/pnas.1109861108. PMC 3189082. PMID 21949368.
- Rivron NC, Vrij EJ, Rouwkema J, Le Gac S, van den Berg A, Truckenmüller RK, van Blitterswijk CA (May 2012). "Tissue deformation spatially modulates VEGF signaling and angiogenesis". Proceedings of the National Academy of Sciences of the United States of America. 109 (18): 6886–91. Bibcode:2012PNAS..109.6886R. doi:10.1073/pnas.1201626109. PMC 3344996. PMID 22511716.
- Danoux C, Sun L, Koçer G, Birgani ZT, Barata D, Barralet J, van Blitterswijk C, Truckenmüller R, Habibovic P (March 2016). "Development of Highly Functional Biomaterials by Decoupling and Recombining Material Properties". Advanced Materials. 28 (9): 1803–8. Bibcode:2016AdM....28.1803D. doi:10.1002/adma.201504589. PMID 26689847. S2CID 205265234.
- Rivron NC, Frias-Aldeguer J, Vrij EJ, Boisset JC, Korving J, Vivié J, Truckenmüller RK, van Oudenaarden A, van Blitterswijk CA, Geijsen N (May 2018). "Blastocyst-like structures generated solely from stem cells" (PDF). Nature. 557 (7703): 106–11. Bibcode:2018Natur.557..106R. doi:10.1038/s41586-018-0051-0. PMID 29720634. S2CID 13749109.
