= Materiomics =

Scientific study of material systems

Materiomics is the holistic study of material systems. Materiomics examines links between physicochemical material properties and material characteristics and function. The focus of materiomics is system functionality and behavior, rather than a piecewise collection of properties, a paradigm similar to systems biology. While typically applied to complex biological systems and biomaterials, materiomics is equally applicable to non-biological systems. Materiomics investigates the material properties of natural and synthetic materials by examining fundamental links between processes, structures and properties at multiple scales, from nano to macro, by using systematic experimental, theoretical or computational methods.

The term has been independently proposed with slightly different definitions in 2004 by T. Akita et al. (AIST/Japan), in 2008 by Markus J. Buehler (MIT/USA), and Clemens van Blitterswijk, Jan de Boer and Hemant Unadkat (University of Twente/The Netherlands) in analogy to genomics, the study of an organism's entire genome. Similarly, materiomics refers to the study of the processes, structures and properties of materials from a fundamental, systematic perspective by incorporating all relevant scales, from nano to macro, in the synthesis and function of materials and structures. The integrated view of these interactions at all scales is referred to as a material's materiome.

New techniques for evaluating materials at the tissue level, such as reference point indentation (RPI) and raman spectroscopy are lending insight into the nature of these highly complex, functional relationships.

Materiomics is related to proteomics, where the difference is the focus on material properties, stability, failure and mechanistic insight into multi-scale phenomena.

In higher education, innovative study programmes in materiomics are emerging.

== See also ==
- Genomics
- Bionanotechnology
- Universality-diversity paradigm

== Other References ==
- : Buehler, M.J., Materiomics: Materials Science of Biological Protein Materials, from Nano to Macro. The A to Z of Materials. (February, 2010).
- Going nature one better (MIT News Release, October 22, 2010).
- M.J. Buehler, Tu(r)ning weakness to strength, Vol. 5(5), pp. 379–383, 2010.
- D.I. Spivak, T. Giesa, E. Wood, M.J. Buehler, Category Theoretic Analysis of Hierarchical Protein Materials and Social Networks, PLoS ONE, Vol. 6(9), pp. e23911, 2011. doi:10.1371/journal.pone.0023911
- T. Giesa, D. Spivak, M.J. Buehler, Reoccurring Patterns in Hierarchical Protein Materials and Music: The Power of Analogies, BioNanoScience, Vol. 1(4), pp. 153–161, 2011, doi:10.1007/s12668-011-0022-5
- Materiomics: High-Throughput Screening of Biomaterial Properties
- Biomateriomics
