= Annalisa Buffa =

Italian mathematician

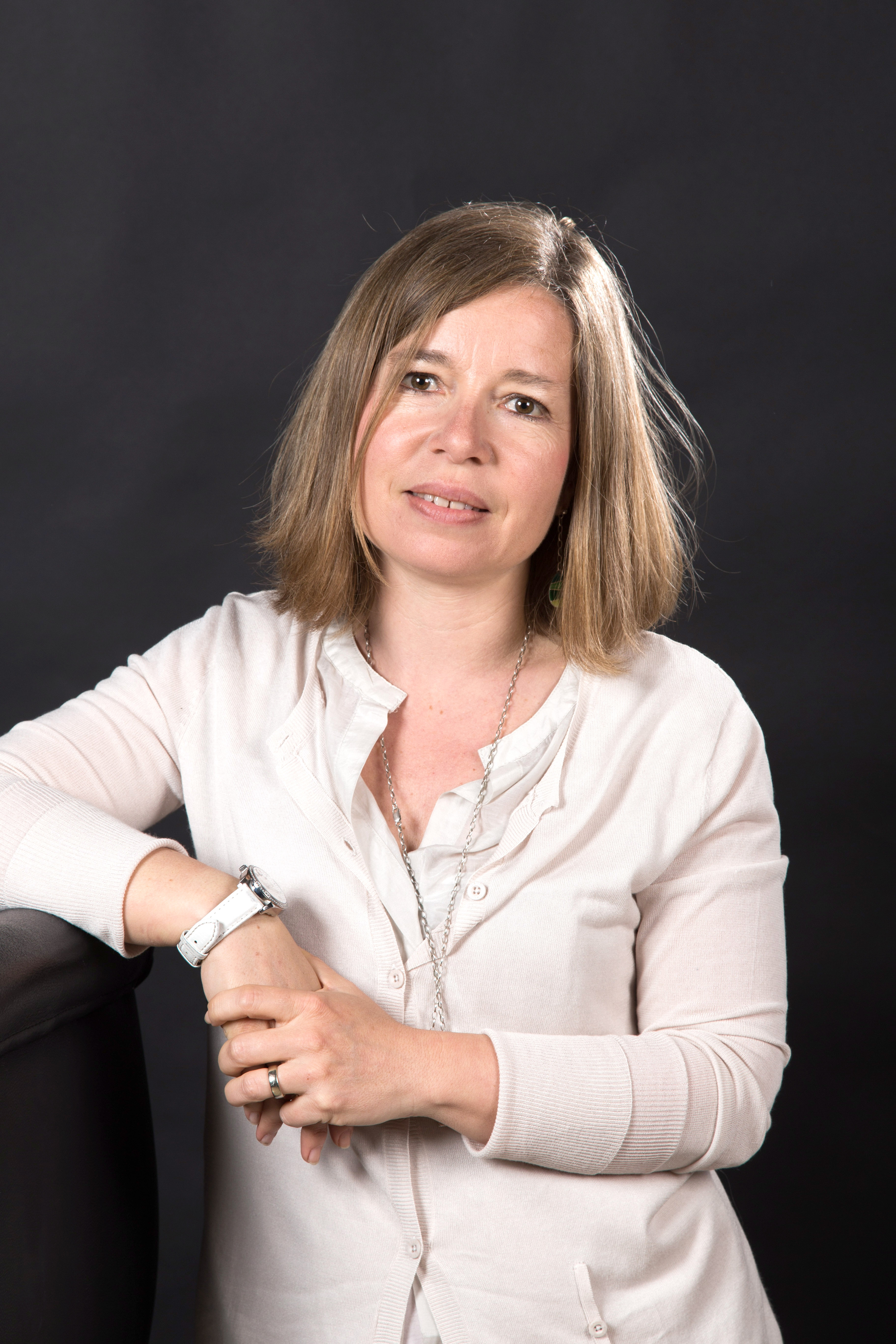
- Buffa in 2020
- Born: 14 February 1973 (age 53)
- Occupation: Mathematician
- Awards: Bartolozzi Prize; Collatz Prize

Academic background
- Education: Mathematics
- Alma mater: University of Milan
- Thesis: Some numerical and theoretical problems in computational electromagnetism (2000)
- Doctoral advisor: Franco Brezzi

Academic work
- Discipline: Mathematics
- Sub-discipline: Numerical analysis; Partial differential equation
- Institutions: EPFL (École Polytechnique Fédérale de Lausanne)
- Doctoral students: Paola Antonietti
- Main interests: Isogeometric analysis; Fully compatible discretization of PDEs; Linear and non linear elasticity; Contact mechanics
- Website: mns.epfl.ch

Annalisa Buffa (born 14 February 1973) is an Italian mathematician, specializing in numerical analysis and partial differential equations (PDE). She is a professor of mathematics at EPFL (École Polytechnique Fédérale de Lausanne) and holds the Chair of Numerical Modeling and Simulation.

== Education and career ==
Buffa received her master's degree in computer engineering in 1996 and received her PhD in 2000, with supervisor Franco Brezzi, from the University of Milan with thesis Some numerical and theoretical problems in computational electromagnetism. From 2001 to 2004 she was a Researcher, from 2004 to 2013 a Research Director (rank equivalent to Professor), and from 2013 to 2016 she was the Director at the Istituto di matematica applicata e tecnologie informatiche "E. Magenes" (IMATI) of the CNR in Pavia.

In 2016 she was promoted to Full Professor of Mathematics. She holds the Chair of Numerical Modeling and Simulation at EPFL.

She has been a visiting scholar at many institutions, including the Laboratoire Jacques-Louis Lions at the University of Paris VI, the École Polytechnique, the ETH Zürich, and the University of Texas at Austin (Institute for Computational Engineering and Sciences, ICES).

== Contributions ==
Buffa's research deals with a wide range of topics in PDEs and numerical analysis: "isogeometric analysis, fully compatible discretization of PDEs, linear and non linear elasticity, contact mechanics, integral equations on non-smooth manifolds, functional theory for Maxwell equations in non-smooth domains, finite element techniques for Maxwell equations, non-conforming domain decomposition methods, asymptotic analysis, stabilization techniques for finite element discretizations."

== Recognition ==
In 2007 Buffa was awarded the Bartolozzi Prize. In 2015 she was awarded the Collatz Prize "for her spectacular use of deep and sophisticated mathematical concepts to obtain outstanding contributions to the development of computer simulations in science and industry" (Laudatio). In 2014, she was an Invited Speaker at the International Congress of Mathematicians in Seoul with talk Spline differential forms. In 2008, she received an ERC Starting Grant and in 2016 an ERC Advanced Grant. She became a member of the Academia Europaea in 2016.

== Selected works ==
- Ji, M.; Ferrari-Trecate, G.; Egerstedt, M.; Buffa, A. (2008). "Containment Control in Mobile Networks". IEEE Transactions on Automatic Control. 53 (8): 1972–1975. Bibcode:2008ITAC...53.1972J. doi:10.1109/TAC.2008.930098. hdl:1853/38429. S2CID 4812106.
- Andriulli, Francesco P.; Cools, Kristof; Bagci, Hakan; Olyslager, Femke; Buffa, Annalisa; Christiansen, Snorre; Michielssen, Eric (2008). "A Multiplicative Calderon Preconditioner for the Electric Field Integral Equation". IEEE Transactions on Antennas and Propagation. 56 (8): 2398–2412. Bibcode:2008ITAP...56.2398A. doi:10.1109/TAP.2008.926788. hdl:1854/LU-677703. S2CID 38745490.
- Buffa, A.; Costabel, M.; Sheen, D. (2002). "On traces for H(curl,Ω) in Lipschitz domains". Journal of Mathematical Analysis and Applications. 276 (2): 845–867. doi:10.1016/S0022-247X(02)00455-9.
- Buffa, A.; Ciarlet, P. (2001). "On traces for functional spaces related to Maxwell's equations Part I: An integration by parts formula in Lipschitz polyhedra". Mathematical Methods in the Applied Sciences. 24 (1): 9–30. Bibcode:2001MMAS...24....9B. doi:10.1002/1099-1476(20010110)24:1<9::AID-MMA191>3.0.CO;2-2.
- Buffa, A.; Sangalli, G.; Vázquez, R. (2010). "Isogeometric analysis in electromagnetics: B-splines approximation". Computer Methods in Applied Mechanics and Engineering. 199 (17–20): 1143–1152. Bibcode:2010CMAME.199.1143B. doi:10.1016/j.cma.2009.12.002.
- Buffa, Annalisa; Christiansen, Snorre H. (2007). "A dual finite element complex on the barycentric refinement". Mathematics of Computation. 76 (260): 1743–1770. Bibcode:2007MaCom..76.1743B. doi:10.1090/S0025-5718-07-01965-5.
- Buffa, Annalisa; Maday, Yvon; Patera, Anthony T.; Prud'Homme, Christophe; Turinici, Gabriel (2012). "A prioriconvergence of the Greedy algorithm for the parametrized reduced basis method". Esaim: Mathematical Modelling and Numerical Analysis. 46 (3): 595–603. doi:10.1051/m2an/2011056. hdl:1721.1/79573.
- Auricchio, F.; Da Veiga, L. Beirão; Buffa, A.; Lovadina, C.; Reali, A.; Sangalli, G. (2007). "A fully "locking-free" isogeometric approach for plane linear elasticity problems: A stream function formulation". Computer Methods in Applied Mechanics and Engineering. 197 (1–4): 160–172. Bibcode:2007CMAME.197..160A. doi:10.1016/j.cma.2007.07.005.
