= Wing Kam Liu =

American mechanical engineer and computational scientist

- Education: University of Illinois at Chicago (B.S.); California Institute of Technology (M.S., Ph.D.)
- Known for: Computational mechanics, mechanistic data science, HiDeNN-AI
- Awards: ASME Robert Henry Thurston Lecture Award (2007); USACM John von Neumann Medal (2007); IACM Gauss–Newton Medal (2012)
- Scientific career
- Fields: Computational mechanics Finite element method Multiscale modeling
- Workplaces: Northwestern University; Sungkyunkwan University

Wing Kam Liu is an American mechanical engineer and computational scientist. He is the Walter P. Murphy Professor of Mechanical Engineering and Civil and Environmental Engineering, and (by courtesy) of Materials Science and Engineering, at Northwestern University. He is known for his contributions to computational mechanics, and has received a number of the field's top honors, including the American Society of Mechanical Engineers (ASME) Robert Henry Thurston Lecture Award.

== Education ==
Liu received a Bachelor of Science in engineering science from the University of Illinois at Chicago, and a Master of Science and a PhD from the California Institute of Technology.

== Career and research ==
Liu is a faculty member in the Department of Mechanical Engineering at Northwestern University. Since 2009 he has also served as a Visiting Distinguished World Class University Professor at Sungkyunkwan University in South Korea.

His research centers on computational mechanics and the integration of established scientific principles with data-driven methods, including work on "mechanistic data science" and an artificial intelligence framework known as HiDeNN-AI. His work spans the finite element method, multiscale modeling and simulation, additive and advanced manufacturing, and materials systems design. He was cited by the Institute for Scientific Information as one of the most highly cited and influential researchers in engineering, and was an original member of its highly cited researchers database in 2001.

== Awards and honors ==
Liu has received several of the major honors in computational mechanics and mechanical engineering, including:

- Gauss–Newton Medal, International Association for Computational Mechanics (2012)
- Robert Henry Thurston Lecture Award, American Society of Mechanical Engineers (2007)
- John von Neumann Medal, U.S. Association for Computational Mechanics (2007)
