= Eugenio Oñate =

Spanish mechanical engineer

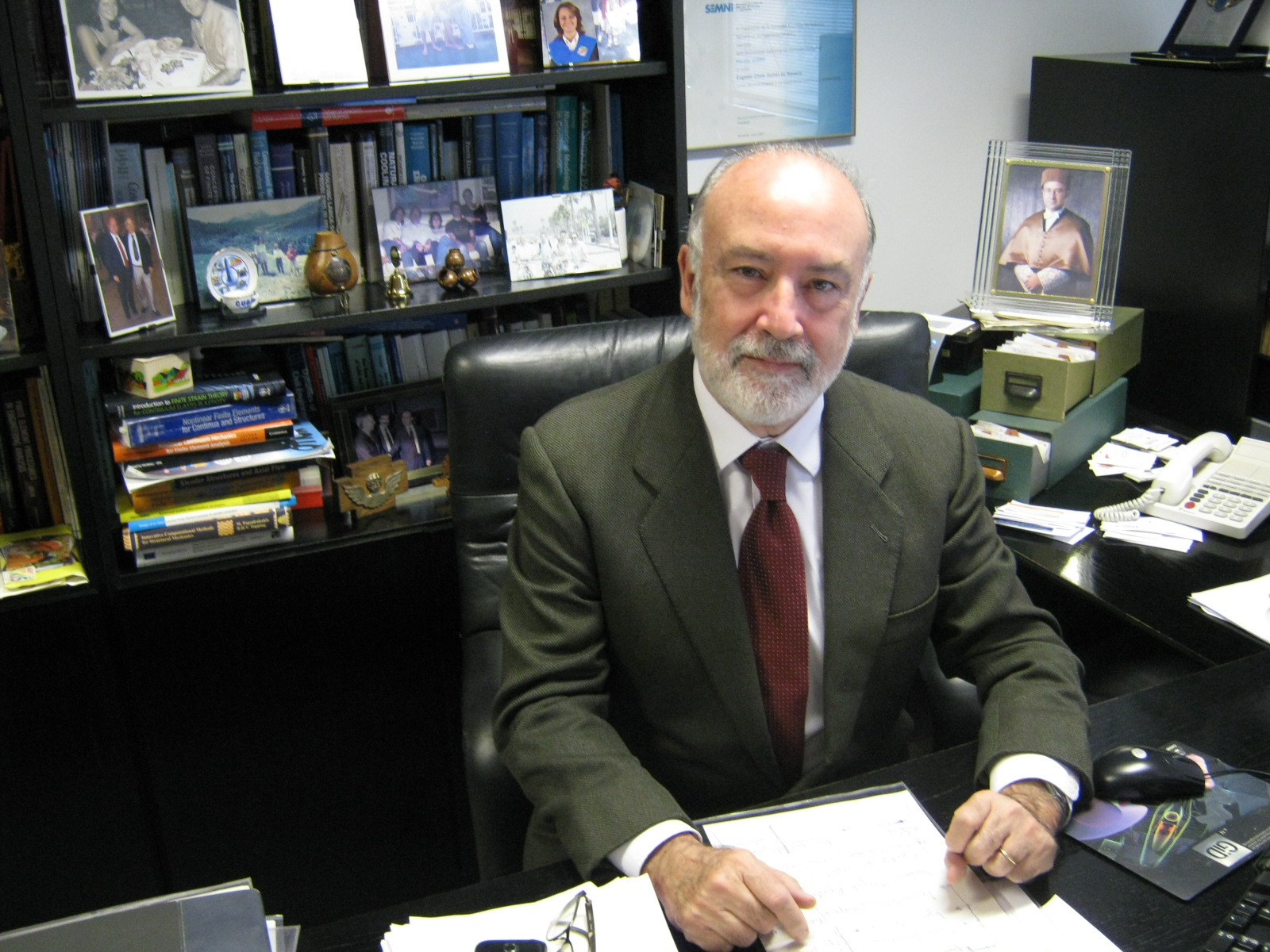
- Eugenio Oñate
- Born: 28 March 1953 (age 73); Valencia, Spain
- Education: Polytechnic University of Valencia; University College of Swansea
- Known for: Finite element method Particle finite element method
- Scientific career
- Fields: Structural mechanics Computational mechanics Finite element method
- Doctoral advisor: Olgierd Zienkiewicz

Eugenio Oñate Ibañez de Navarra (Valencia, 28 March 1953), often referred as Eugenio Onãte, is a Spanish engineer who works in computational mechanics.

== Books ==
- Oñate E., Kröplin B., Textile Composites and Inflatable Structures (Computational Methods in Applied Sciences), Springer 2005.
- Oñate E., Owen R., Computational Methods in Applied Sciences, Volume 7: Computational Plasticity, Springer 2007.
- Oñate E., Structural Analysis with the Finite Element Method. Linear Statics, Volume 1: Basis and Solids (Lecture Notes on Numerical Methods in Engineering and Sciences), Springer 2009.
- Oñate E., Structural Analysis with the Finite Element Method. Linear Statics, Volume 2: Beams, Plates and Shells (Lecture Notes on Numerical Methods in Engineering and Sciences), Springer 2010.
