= J. N. Reddy (engineer) =

American academic (born 1945)

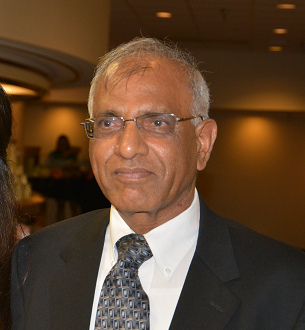
- Born: 12 August 1945 (age 81); Warangal, Hyderabad State, British India (now Telangana, India)
- Education: Osmania University, Oklahoma State University, University of Alabama in Huntsville
- Known for: Finite element method, plate and shell theory, micromechanics, applied mathematics, computational mechanics
- Awards: ASME Medal & Timoshenko Medal (2016 & 2019)
- Scientific career
- Workplaces: University of Oklahoma, Virginia Tech, Texas A&M University
- Doctoral advisor: Tinsley Oden

Junuthula N. Reddy (born 12 August 1945) is a Distinguished Professor and the inaugural Oscar S. Wyatt Endowed Chair in Mechanical Engineering at Texas A&M University. He is known for his contributions to the finite element method, solid mechanics, plate theory, composite materials, and applied mathematics. Reddy has published over 620 journal articles, authored 20 books, and delivered more than 150 invited talks worldwide. He is listed among the ISI Highly Cited Researchers in Engineering, with over 54,000 citations, an h-index of 123, and an i10-index of 721on Google Scholar.

== Education ==
He has a PhD from University of Alabama in Huntsville, Alabama, a M.S. In Mechanical Engineering from Oklahoma State University in Stillwater, Oklahoma, and a B.E. in Mechanical Engineering from Osmania University.

== Awards ==
- 2023 Leonardo da Vinci Award
- Timoshenko Medal, American Society of Mechanical Engineers, 2019.
- ASME Medal, American Society of Mechanical Engineers, 2016.
- Prager Medal, Society of Engineering Science (medal presented at 53rd Annual Technical Meeting at University of Maryland, 4–6 October 2016).

== Books ==
- J. T. Oden and J. N. Reddy, A Mathematical Theory of Finite Elements, Wiley-Interscience (1976)
- J. T. Oden and J. N. Reddy, Variational Methods in Theoretical Mechanics, 2nd ed., Springer-Verlag (1982)
- J. N. Reddy and M. L. Rasmussen, Advanced Engineering Analysis, John Wiley (1982) reprinted by Krieger, Melbourne, FL, 1990
- J. N. Reddy, Applied Functional Analysis and Variational Methods in Engineering, McGraw-Hill (1986); reprinted by Krieger, Melbourne (1991)
- O. O. Ochoa and J. N. Reddy, Finite Element Analysis of Composite Laminates, 2nd ed., Kluwer Academic Publishers, The Netherlands (1992) ISBN 0-7923-1125-6
- J. N. Reddy and A. Miravete, Practical Analysis of Laminated Composite Structures, 3rd ed., CRC Press, FL, 1995. ISBN 0-8493-9401-5
- C. M. Wang, J. N. Reddy and K.H. Lee, Shear Deformation Theories of Beams and Plates Dynamics Relationships with Classical Solution, Elsevier, U.K., 2000. ISBN 0-08-043784-2
- J. N. Reddy, Energy Principles and Variational Methods in Applied Mechanics, 2nd ed., John Wiley (2002) ISBN 0-471-17985-X, 3rd edition to appear in 2017.
- J. N. Reddy, An Introduction to Nonlinear Finite Element Analysis, Oxford University Press, USA (2004). ISBN 0-19-852529-X
- J. N. Reddy, Mechanics of Laminated Composite Plates and Shells: Theory and Analysis, 2nd ed., CRC Press (2004). ISBN 0-8493-1592-1
- J. N. Reddy, An Introduction to the Finite Element Method, 3rd ed., McGraw-Hill Education (2005). ISBN 0-07-124473-5
- J. N. Reddy and D. K. Gartling, The Finite Element Method in Heat Transfer and Fluid Dynamics, 3rd ed., CRC Press, FL, 2010. ISBN 1-4200-8598-0
- J. N. Reddy, Theory and Analysis of Elastic Plates and Shells, 2nd ed., Taylor & Francis (2007) ISBN 0-8493-8415-X
- C. M. Wang, C. Y. Wang, and J. N. Reddy, Exact Solutions for Buckling of Structural Members, CRC Press (2005) ISBN 0-8493-2222-7
- J. N. Reddy, Principles of Continuum Mechanics. A Study of Conservation Principles with Applications, Cambridge University Press (2010) ISBN 0-521-51369-3
- R. T. Fenner and J. N. Reddy, Mechanics of Solids and Structures, 2nd ed., CRC Press (2012) ISBN 0-632-02018-0
- J. N. Reddy, An Introduction to Continuum Mechanics with Applications, 2nd ed., Cambridge University Press (2013) ISBN 978-0-521-87044-3
- J. N. Reddy, An Introduction to Nonlinear Finite Element Analysis, 2nd ed., Oxford University Press (2015) ISBN 0-19-852529-X
- Ashwin Rao, A.R. Srinivasa and J. N. Reddy, Design of Shape Memory Alloy (SMA) Actuators, Springer (2015) ISBN 978-3-319-03187-3 (Print) and ISBN 978-3-319-03188-0 (Online)
- K.S. Surana and J.N. Reddy, The Finite Element Method for Boundary Value Problems, Mathematics and Computations, CRC Press, to appear (2017)
- J. N. Reddy, Introduction to the Finite Element Method, 4th ed., McGraw-Hill Education (2019). ISBN 978-9-390-38527-0
