= Ken Morgan =

Ken Morgan may refer to:

- Dakta Green (born 1950), New Zealand cannabis law reform activist
- Ken Morgan (trade unionist) (1928–2015), English trade union leader
- Ken Morgan (footballer) (1932–2008), Welsh footballer
- Ken Morgan (politician) (born 1951), American politician
