= Ilaria Perugia =

Italian applied mathematician

Ilaria Perugia (born 1969) is an Italian applied mathematician and numerical analyst whose research concerns numerical methods for partial differential equations, especially Galerkin methods. She works at the University of Vienna in Austria as Professor of the Numerics of Partial Differential Equations.

== Early life and education ==
Perugia was born on 23 October 1969 in Milan. She studied mathematics at the University of Pavia, working there with Gianni Arrigo Pozzi and Franco Brezzi. She earned a laurea in 1993, winning the university's triennial Berzolari Prize for best laurea thesis.

Next, she moved to the University of Milan for graduate study in computational mathematics and operations research, completing her Ph.D. in 1998. Her doctoral dissertation, Discretization of Linearly Constrained Problems And Applications In Scientific Computing, was again supervised by Brezzi.

== Career ==
Perugia held a research appointment at the University of Pavia from 1995 to 2001, during which time she also visited the University of Minnesota as a postdoctoral researcher. In 2001 she was given an associate professorship at the University of Pavia, and in 2011 she became Professor of Numerical Analysis there. She moved to her present position in Vienna in 2013, and became deputy director of the Erwin Schrödinger International Institute for Mathematics and Physics at the University of Vienna in 2016.

She has also held a research associate position with the Italian National Research Council (CNR), in their Pavia-based Institute for Applied Mathematics and Information Technologies (IMATI), since 2001.
