= Universality–diversity paradigm =

The universality–diversity paradigm (UDP) is the analysis of biological materials based on the universality and diversity of its fundamental structural elements and functional mechanisms. The analysis of biological systems based on this classification has been a cornerstone of modern biology.

== Example: proteins ==
For example, proteins constitute the elementary building blocks of a vast variety of biological materials such as cells, spider silk or bone, where they create extremely robust, multi-functional materials by self-organization of structures over many length- and time scales, from nano to macro. Some of the structural features are commonly found in many different tissues, that is, they are highly conserved. Examples of such universal building blocks include alpha-helices, beta-sheets or tropocollagen molecules. In contrast, other features are highly specific to tissue types, such as particular filament assemblies, beta-sheet nanocrystals in spider silk or tendon fascicles. This coexistence of universality and diversity is an overarching feature in biological materials and a crucial component of materiomics. It might provide guidelines for bioinspired and biomimetic material development, where this concept is translated into the use of inorganic or hybrid organic-inorganic building blocks.

== See also ==
- Bionics
- Materiomics
- Nanotechnology
- Phylogenetics
