= Gianluigi Rozza =

Italian mathematician (born 1977)

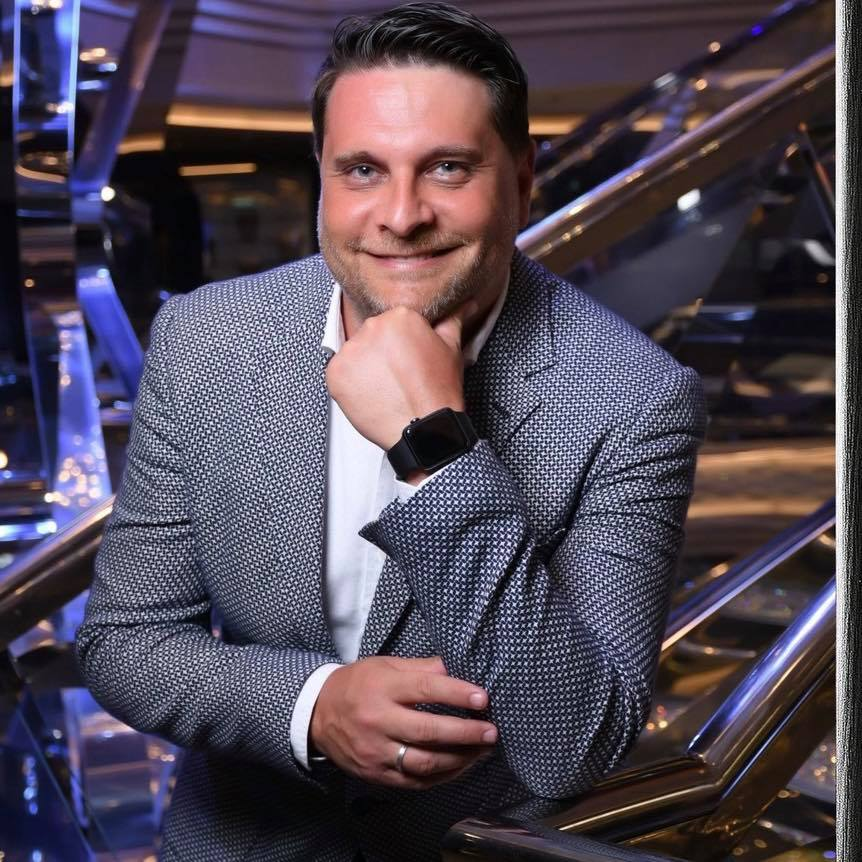
- Self-portrait photograph
- Born: April 20, 1977 (age 49); Sant'Angelo Lodigiano, Italy
- Education: Polytechnic University of Milan (MSc, 2002); École Polytechnique Fédérale de Lausanne (PhD, 2005)
- Known for: Reduced order methods for parametrized PDEs
- Awards: SIAM Fellow (2025); ECCOMAS Fellow (2026); J.-L. Lions Award (2014)
- Scientific career
- Fields: Numerical analysis, computational science
- Workplaces: SISSA; MIT; EPFL
- Thesis: Shape Design by Optimal Flow Control and Reduced basis Techniques: Applications to Bypass Configurations in Haemodynamics (2005)
- Doctoral advisors: Alfio Quarteroni; Anthony T. Patera

Gianluigi Rozza (born 1977) is an Italian applied mathematician and aerospace engineer known for his work on reduced order methods for parametrized partial differential equations, particularly in computational fluid dynamics. He is a full professor of numerical analysis and scientific computing at the International School for Advanced Studies (SISSA) in Trieste, where he leads the SISSA mathLab laboratory. He was elected President of the Italian Society for Applied and Industrial Mathematics (SIMAI) in 2025 and Vice President of the European Community on Computational Methods in Applied Sciences (ECCOMAS) in 2026.

== Early life and education ==
Rozza was born in Sant'Angelo Lodigiano, Italy. He studied aerospace engineering at the Polytechnic University of Milan, graduating in 2002, and then moved to the École Polytechnique Fédérale de Lausanne (EPFL), where he received a PhD in 2005 with the thesis Shape design by optimal flow control and reduced basis techniques: applications to bypass configurations in haemodynamics, supervised by Alfio Quarteroni and Anthony T. Patera.

== Career ==
After his doctorate, Rozza remained at EPFL for about a year in Quarteroni's group. From 2006 to 2008 he was a postdoctoral associate in the Department of Mechanical Engineering at the Massachusetts Institute of Technology (MIT), in Patera's group. He then returned to EPFL as a senior research scientist in the Chair of Modelling and Scientific Computing and lecturer at the Doctoral School of Mathematics.

In 2012 he joined SISSA, where he became associate professor in 2014 and full professor in 2018. At SISSA he leads the SISSA mathLab laboratory. He coordinated the PhD programme in Mathematical Analysis, Modelling, and Applications (AMMA) from 2018 to 2020 and the Mathematics Area from 2020 to 2024. As of 2026, he is vice-coordinator of the Mathematics Area and the Director's Delegate for Innovation, Valorisation, Knowledge and Technology Transfer.

== Research ==
Rozza works on reduced order methods for partial differential equations that depend on parameters, such as geometry, material properties or flow conditions. Simulating such systems with standard techniques like the finite element method can take hours or days for each parameter value, which makes design optimization, control, uncertainty quantification and real-time applications impractical. Reduced order methods split the computation into an expensive "offline" stage, in which a limited number of high-fidelity solutions are computed and compressed into a low-dimensional basis, and an inexpensive "online" stage, in which solutions for new parameter values are obtained rapidly by working only in that reduced space.

His doctoral research combined reduced basis methods with optimal control theory for the shape optimization of arterial bypass grafts. At MIT he contributed to the "certified" reduced basis framework, which provides rigorous a posteriori bounds on the error introduced by the reduction, and co-developed the software package rbMIT.

At SISSA his work has focused on extending reduced order methods to computational fluid dynamics, including nonlinear and turbulent flows and bifurcation problems, with applications in naval, aeronautical, mechanical and biomedical engineering. This was the subject of his ERC Consolidator Grant project AROMA-CFD, which also produced the open-source library ITHACA. His election as a SIAM Fellow in 2025 recognized his "contributions to the development of reduced order models for CFD applications".

=== Research grants ===
In 2016 Rozza was awarded a European Research Council (ERC) Consolidator Grant for the project AROMA-CFD (2016–2022), followed in 2022 by an ERC Proof of Concept grant for the project ARGOS. In 2025 he received a grant from the Italian Science Fund (FIS) of the Italian Ministry of University and Research for the project ROSA (Reduced Order and Surrogate methods for advanced Applications).

=== Professional service and technology transfer ===
Rozza joined the Executive Committee of ECCOMAS in 2022 and was elected its Vice President in July 2026. In September 2025 he was elected President of the Italian Society for Applied and Industrial Mathematics (SIMAI). He coordinates Spoke 9 of iNEST (Interconnected Nord-Est Innovation Ecosystem), a research consortium funded by Italy's National Recovery and Resilience Plan.

In 2022 he co-founded FAST Computing, a SISSA spin-off company, of which he is scientific director. He is also president of Simplifica, a joint venture between FAST Computing and Bio4Dreams.

== Awards and honours ==
- 2004 – Bill Morton Prize, ICFD Conference on Numerical Methods for Fluid Dynamics, Oxford
- 2006 – ECCOMAS Award for the best PhD thesis of 2005 in computational methods in applied sciences and engineering
- 2009 – Springer Computational Science and Engineering (CSE) Prize, with Phuong Huynh and Ngoc-Cuong Nguyen, for the rbMIT software package
- 2014 – ECCOMAS J.-L. Lions Award for Young Scientists in Computational Mathematics
- 2025 – Fellow of the Society for Industrial and Applied Mathematics
- 2025 – Gili Agostinelli Prize, Accademia delle Scienze di Torino
- 2026 – Fellow of ECCOMAS (inaugural class)

== Selected publications ==
- Rozza, G.; Huynh, D. B. P.; Patera, A. T. (2008). "Reduced basis approximation and a posteriori error estimation for affinely parametrized elliptic coercive partial differential equations". Archives of Computational Methods in Engineering. 15 (3): 229–275. doi:10.1007/s11831-008-9019-9.
- Quarteroni, A.; Rozza, G.; Manzoni, A. (2011). "Certified reduced basis approximation for parametrized partial differential equations and applications". Journal of Mathematics in Industry.
- Quarteroni, A.; Rozza, G., eds. (2014). Reduced Order Methods for Modeling and Computational Reduction. MS&A. Springer.
- Hesthaven, J. S.; Rozza, G.; Stamm, B. (2016). Certified Reduced Basis Methods for Parametrized Partial Differential Equations. SpringerBriefs in Mathematics. Springer.
- Benner, P.; et al., eds. (2021). Model Order Reduction. Vol. 1–3. De Gruyter.
- Rozza, G.; Stabile, G.; Ballarin, F., eds. (2022). Advanced Reduced Order Methods and Applications in Computational Fluid Dynamics. SIAM.
