= Alfio Quarteroni =

Italian mathematician (born 1952)

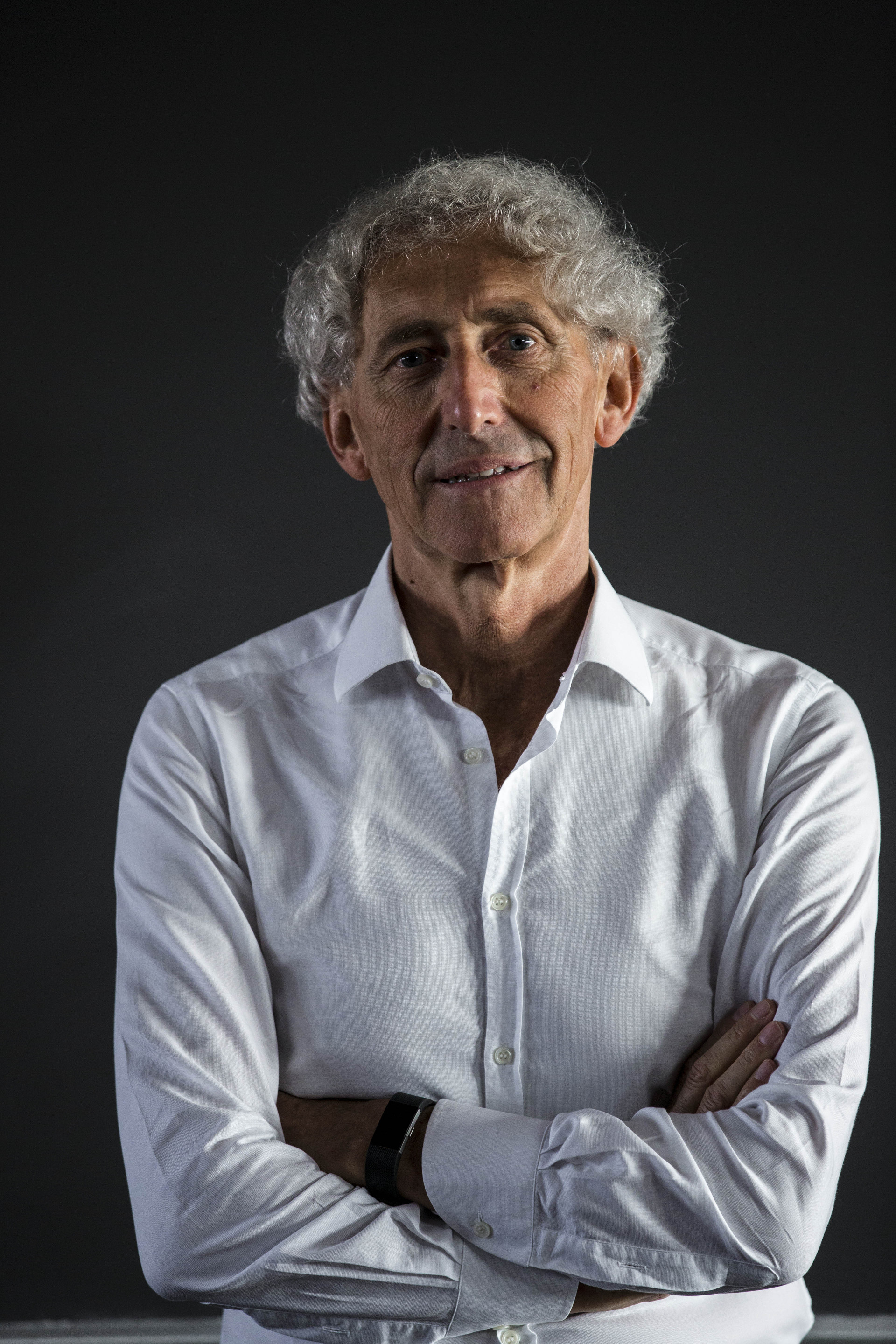
- Self-portrait photograph
- Born: May 30, 1952 (age 74)
- Education: U. of Pavia
- Occupation: Mathematician
- Scientific career
- Thesis: Numerical Analysis of Biharmonic Operators with Hybrid Finite Element Method (1975)
- Doctoral advisor: Franco Brezzi
- Doctoral students: Gianluigi Rozza, Fabio Nobile, Alessandro Veneziani, Luca Dede’, Simone Deparis, Andrea Manzoni, Paolo Zunino, Annalisa Quaini, Goncalo Pena, Peng Chen, Niccolò Del Santo, Francesco Ballarin, Francesco Regazzoni, Simona Perotto, Benjamin Stamm, Paola Gervasio, Nicola Parolini

Alfio Quarteroni (born 30 May 1952) is an Italian and Swiss mathematician.

He is Professor Emeritus at Politecnico di Milano and at the École Polytechnique Fédérale de Lausanne (EPFL), Senior Research Fellow at the University of Texas at Austin, Professor at the Chinese University of Hong Kong, Shenzhen, Commander of the Order of Merit of the Italian Republic, and President of the Fondazione Comunitaria della Provincia di Lodi (a philanthropic foundation).

He is the founder (and first director) of MOX at Politecnico of Milan (2002) and MATHICSE at EPFL, Lausanne (2010). He is co-founder (and President) of MOXOFF, a spin-off company at Politecnico of Milan (2010).

He is member of the Italian Academy of Science (Accademia Nazionale dei Lincei), the European Academy of Science, the Academia Europaea (Academy of Europe), the Lisbon Academy of Sciences, the Istituto Lombardo Accademia di Scienze e Lettere and the Italian Academy of Engineering and Technology.

He is author of 26 books (some of them translated into up to 7 languages), editor of 8 books, author of more than 400 papers published in international Scientific Journals and Conference Proceedings, member of the editorial board of 25 International Journals, and Editor in Chief of two-book series published by Springer.

He has been an invited or plenary speaker in more than 300 International Conferences and Academic Departments, he has been plenary speaker at ICM 2006 in Madrid.

Among his awards and honors are: the NASA Group Achievement Award for the pioneering work in Computational Fluid Dynamics in 1992, the Fanfullino della Riconoscenza 2006, Città di Lodi, the Premio Capo D'Orlando 2006, the Ghislieri prize, 2013, the International Galileo Galilei prize for Sciences 2015. He is recipient of the Galileian Chair from the Scuola Normale Superiore, Pisa, Italy, 2001, doctor Honoris Causa in Naval Engineering from University of Trieste, Italy, 2003, SIAM Fellow (first row) since 2009, IACM (International Association of Computational Mechanics) Fellow since 2004, honorary fellow of ECCOMAS since 2015, the Courant Lectures 2010, the Euler Lecture 2017, the Russell Marker Lectures 2018, the Pedro Nunes Lectures 2018, the Euler Medal from Eccomas (2021–22), the Lagrange Prize from ICIAM (2020–23), the Blaise Pascal Medal in Mathematics in 2024 from the European Academy of Sciences, the Ritz-Galerkin medal from ECCOMAS (2021–24), the Ralph E. Kleinman Prize 2024-2025 by SIAM, the Olof Widlund Prize 2026, the Gauss-Newton Medal (2025-2026) by IACM

He has been a member of the IMU Fields Medal Committee for ICM (the International Congress of Mathematicians) 2022.

He is the recipient of the ERC Advanced Grant for the project "MATHCARD" in 2008, of two ERC PoC (Proof of Concept) grants: "Math2Ward" in 2012 and "Math4AAARisk" in 2015, and of another ERC Advanced Grant for the project "iHEART" in 2017."

His research interests concern Mathematical Modelling, Numerical Analysis, Scientific Computing, Scientific Machine Learning, and application to fluid mechanics, environment, geophysics, medicine, and the improvement of sports performance. He has been the director of 70 Phd students. His research Group at EPFL has contributed to the preliminary design of Solar Impulse, the Swiss long-range experimental solar-powered aircraft project, and has carried out the mathematical simulation for the optimization of performances of the Alinghi yacht, the winner of two editions (2003 and 2007) of the America's Cup.

In 2026 he was ranked n.55 in the Top Scientist-Mathematics from research.com, n.1 in Italy.
