= Franco Brezzi =

Italian mathematician

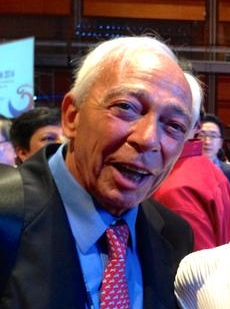
Brezzi in 2014

Franco Brezzi (born 29 April 1945 in Vimercate) is an Italian mathematician.

== Education ==
Brezzi graduated in 1967 at the Università di Pavia under the supervision of Enrico Magenes. He was full professor of Mathematical Analysis at the Politecnico di Torino from 1976 to 1977 and then from 1977 to 2006 at the Università di Pavia. He was a professor of Numerical Analysis at the Istituto Universitario di Studi Superiori (IUSS) in Pavia from 2006 until his retirement in 2015. Presently he is Emeritus Professor at IUSS and Associate Researcher at IUSS (Istituto Universitario di Studi Superiori) of Italian CNR (Consiglio Nazionale delle Ricerche)

== Research ==
His research deals with, among other subjects, the theory and applications of the finite element method in structural mechanics, fluid mechanics, and electrodynamics. Brezzi's best-known result is the independent derivation in 1974 of the Ladyschenskaja-Babuška-Brezzi condition, often called the inf-sup condition. The LBB condition is a sufficient condition for the numerical stability of mixed finite element problems with saddle point structure, such as the discretization of the incompressible Navier-Stokes equations or the treatment of Darcy's law in differential form.

His doctoral students include Annalisa Buffa and Alfio Quarteroni. Brezzi is serving as a managing editor for Mathematical Models & Methods in Applied Sciences, as the editor-in-chief of Calcolo and of Numerische Mathematik, and as a member of the editorial staffs of numerous journals.

== Academy of Sciences ==
He is a member of the Accademia dei Lincei, of the European Academy of Sciences and of the Istituto Lombardo, Accademia di Scienze e Lettere. He was elected in 2002 a fellow of the International Association of Computational Mechanics (IACM) and in 2015 a fellow of the Society for Industrial and Applied Mathematics (SIAM).* "SIAM News > Home". SIAM. 17 October 2022. He is a Highly Cited Researcher of the ISI.

== Leadership positions ==
Brezzi was the President of the Italian Mathematical Union from 2006 to 2012. He was the Director of the Istituto di Analisi Numerica of the CNR from 1992 to 2002 and of the Istituto di Matematica Applicata e Tecnologie Informatiche of CNR from 2002 to 2012. He was a Member of the Executive Committee of the European Mathematical Society from 2009 to 2012, and then Vice-President from 2013 to 2016.

== Awards ==
In 2004 he was awarded the Gauss-Newton gold medal of the International Association for Computational Mechanics (IACM) of the World Congress of Computational Mechanics in Beijing.

In 2006 he was an Invited Speaker at the ICM in 1986 in Berkeley.

In 2006 he was made Commendatore al merito of the Italian Republic.

In 2009 he was honored by the Society for Industrial and Applied Mathematics as the John von Neumann Lecturer for 2009.

In 2010 the Accademia delle Scienze di Torino awarded him the Gili Agostinelli Prize for mathematical applications in the physical or natural sciences.

In 2012 he received the Blaise Pascal Medal for Mathematics for his contributions to the theory of finite element methods.

In 2013 he received the Civica Benemerenza di San Siro with a gold medal from the city of Pavia.

In 2014 in Barcelona he was awarded the Leonhard Euler Medal of the European Community on Computational Methods in Applied Science (ECCOMAS).

In 2014 he was a Plenary Speaker at the ICM in Seoul with talk The great beauty of VEMs.

In 2016 he received the Ritz-Galerkin Medal of ECCOMAS in Crete, Grece.

In 2017 he was chosen as Feng Kang Lecturer by the Beijing Academy of Sciences.
