= Olgierd Zienkiewicz =

British academic of Polish descent, mathematician and civil engineer

Professor Olgierd Zienkiewicz CBE FRS FREng
- Born: 18 May 1921; Caterham, UK
- Died: 2 January 2009 (aged 87); Swansea, UK
- Education: Imperial College
- Engineering career
- Discipline: Civil engineer, Structural engineer
- Institutions: Institution of Civil Engineers, Institution of Structural Engineers
- Significant advance: Finite element method in structural mechanics
- Awards: IStructE Gold Medal; Royal Medal (1990); Timoshenko Medal (1998)

Olgierd Cecil Zienkiewicz (18 May 1921 – 2 January 2009) was a British academic of Polish descent, mathematician, and civil engineer. He was born in Caterham, England. He was one of the early pioneers of the finite element method. Since his first paper in 1947 dealing with numerical approximation to the stress analysis of dams, he published nearly 600 papers and wrote or edited more than 25 books.

== Early education ==
His school education took place in Poland, where his father was a judge of the Katowice district. He and his family moved to the UK due to World War II. Zienkiewicz studied in the early 1940s at Imperial College London for an undergraduate BSc (Hons) degree in civil engineering which he obtained in 1943 with first class honours. Then, after being offered a scholarship, he stayed for two more years at Imperial College to carry out research on dams under the supervision of Professors Alfred Pippard and Sir Richard V. Southwell. He was awarded the PhD degree in 1945 with his thesis title "Classical theories of gravity dam design in the light of modern analytical methods".

== Contributions to science ==
Zienkiewicz was notable for having recognized the general potential for using the finite element method to resolve problems in areas outside the area of solid mechanics. The idea behind finite elements design is to develop tools based in computational mechanics schemes that can be useful to designers, not solely for research purposes. His books on the Finite Element Method were the first to present the subject and to this day remain the standard reference texts. He also founded the first journal dealing with computational mechanics in 1968 (International Journal for Numerical Methods in Engineering), which is still the major journal for the field of Numerical Computations.

== International recognition ==
The international range of Zienkiewicz' academic experiences has been geographically diverse. He became a lecturer at the Department of Engineering, University of Edinburgh, UK (1949–1957) before becoming Professor of Structural and Civil Engineering at Northwestern University, Illinois, USA (1957–1961). From 1961 to 1988 he was Head of the Department of Civil Engineering at Swansea University. He was latterly Professor Emeritus of this institution. Other teaching positions have included:

- International Centre for Numerical Methods in Engineering (CIMNE), Barcelona, Spain—Professor of Numerical Methods in Engineering
- Polytechnic University of Catalonia, Barcelona, Spain—UNESCO Chair of Numerical Methods in Engineering
- University of Texas, Austin—Joe C. Walter Chair of Engineering.

=== Honours ===
Zienkiewicz received over 30 honorary degrees from Ireland, Belgium, Norway, Sweden, China, Poland, Scotland, Wales, France, England, Italy, Portugal, Hungary and the United States.

He was elected to a number of learned societies, including:

- Royal Society
- Royal Academy of Engineering, 1979
- United States National Academy of Engineering (foreign member)
- Polish Academy of Sciences
- Italian National Academy of Sciences
- Chinese Academy of Sciences

He has been the recipient of many honours, awards, and medals. including

- Commander of the Order of the British Empire
- Royal Medal (Royal Society)
- Carl Friedrich Gauss Medal (West German Academy of Science)
- Nathan Newmark Medal (American Society of Civil Engineers)
- Newton Gauss Medal (International Association for Computational Mechanics)
- Gold Medal (Institution for Mathematics and its Applications)
- Gold Medal (Institution of Structural Engineers)
- Timoshenko Medal (American Society of Mechanical Engineers)
- Prince Philip Medal (Royal Academy of Engineering),
- Zienkiewicz has been listed as an ISI Highly Cited Author in Engineering by the ISI Web of Knowledge, Thomson Scientific Company.

He was instrumental in setting up the association of computational mechanics in engineering for the United Kingdom (now the UK Association for Computational Mechanics, UKACM) in 1992 and was the honorary president for the association for the rest of his life.

The Institution of Civil Engineers awards a prize in his honour biennially. The Zienkiewicz Numerical Methods in Engineering Prize was instituted in 1998 following a donation by John Wiley & Sons Ltd to commemorate his work in Numerical Methods in Engineering.

== See also ==
- Imperial College Civil & Environmental Engineering
