= Nancy Sottos =

American materials scientist

- Education: University of Delaware
- Spouse: Scott White
- Scientific career
- Fields: Materials science and engineering, molecular and electronic nanostructures
- Workplaces: University of Illinois at Urbana–Champaign
- Doctoral advisor: Roy McCullough

External videos
- Nancy Sottos,"BP-ICAM Webinar Series 2016: Polymers with Biologically-Inspired Autonomous Functions", The BP International Centre for Advanced Materials

Nancy Sottos is an American materials scientist and professor of engineering. She is the Swanlund Endowed Chair and the head of the Department of Materials Science and Engineering at the University of Illinois at Urbana–Champaign. She is also a co-chair of the Molecular and Electronic Nanostructures Research Theme at the Beckman Institute for Advanced Science and Technology. She heads the Sottos Research Group.

Sottos studies deformation and failure of materials at mesoscale, microscale, and nanoscale levels, and has made significant contributions in self-healing material, advanced polymer matrix composites, and thin films. She is a pioneer in the area of adaptive materials, creating the first self-healing polymers with Jeffrey S. Moore, Scott R. White, and others as of 2000.

== Education ==
Nancy Sottos studied mechanical engineering at the University of Delaware, receiving her B.S. in 1986 and her Ph.D. in 1991. She also participated in women's varsity track and field and was active on the Athletic Governing Board and the Commission on the Status of Women.

== Career ==
Sottos accepted a faculty position in the College of Engineering at the University of Illinois at Urbana–Champaign in 1991. She was a member of the Department of Theoretical and Applied Mechanics, eventually serving as its interim head. In 2006 she joined the Department of Materials Science and Engineering. She was named the Donald B. Willet Professor of Engineering of the Department of Materials Science and Engineering and a University Scholar. She was appointed co-chair of the Molecular and Electronic Nanostructures Research Theme at the Beckman Institute for Advanced Science and Technology in 2004, succeeding Jeffrey Moore.

Sottos has been active on the editorial boards of Experimental Mechanics (1999–2006) and Composites Science and Technology (2002–present). She is a Fellow of the Society of Engineering Science (2007) and Fellow of the Society for Experimental Mechanics (2012). She was the president of the Society for Experimental Mechanics for 2014–2015. She was elected a member of the National Academy of Engineering in 2020 for contributions to the design and applications of self-healing and multifunctional materials.

== Research ==
=== Self-healing polymers ===
Sottos helped develop the first polymeric self-healing material with colleagues including Jeffrey Moore and Scott White. The work was completed in 2000, and published in Nature in 2001. They have shown that microencapsulated healing agents can polymerize to heal areas of damage such as cracks smaller than a human hair. Their approach was to develop a polymeric matrix which involved both a reactive liquid healing agent and a catalyst. While undamaged, these were kept structurally separate. The liquid agent was contained inside non-reactive reservoirs within the material, while the catalyst was dispersed throughout the polymer. Once the material was damaged and a crack occurred, the reservoirs broke open, and capillary action caused the liquid agent to disperse into the damaged area, where it reacted with the catalyst and solidified to seal the crack. They have studied both the use of a contained healing agent and a dispersed catalyst, and the use of a dispersed healing agent and a contained catalyst. Using dicyclopentadiene (DCPD) and Grubbs' catalyst in an epoxy matrix, polycyclopendiene was formed to seal cracks, recovering up to 75% of the original fracture toughness.

They have since developed a catalyst-free self-healing system using chlorobenzene microcapsules for the active solvent. Cracking releases the chlorobenzene solvent, which washes pockets of unreacted epoxy monomers into the crack. There polymerization occurs to fill the crack. Tests of the catalyst-free self-healing system have restored up to 82% of the fracture's strength.

Both approaches are examples of autonomous self-healing, in which the repair mechanism is triggered by the occurrence of damage. Materials that autonomously self-repair can retain their structural integrity under stress and last longer.

=== Microvascular networks ===
Sottos has also focused on the design of microvascular networks for the distribution of active fluids in autonomous materials systems. Such designs offer possibilities for "self-healing, regeneration, self-sensing, self-protection and self-cooling" properties, similar to those of biological systems.

To create such a material, a three-dimensional pattern of organic inks is laid down, and the interstitial pores in the pattern are filled with epoxy resin. The polymer is left to cure, and then the ink is removed. The spaces it leaves form well-defined, three-dimensional microchannel networks, which can be filled with healing agents. With this design, a greater supply of self-healing agent can be incorporated into the created material. The process of constructing such a material is very complex. This approach has been used to support repeated self-healing in fiber-reinforced composite materials. An epoxy resin and a hardener can be stored in adjacent overlapping microchannel networks. Damage to the network structure causes the healing agents to autonomously mix and polymerize, effectively glueing together the damaged area. Healing was reported to occur at nearly 100 percent efficiency over multiple fracture cycles. This approach has potential applications in the design and use of fiberglass and other composite materials for structures including airplanes and wind turbines. It is reported that microvascular networks can support healing of larger-scale damage, up to 11.2 mm.

=== Self reporting materials ===
A team led by Sottos and Wenle Li has developed polymeric structural materials that can indicate the presence of damage by changing color. Such self-reporting materials can act as a color changing warning system. The researchers created a polymer that contained microcapsules of epoxy resin and PH-sensitive dye. Damage to the polymer causes the capsules to break open and the epoxy and dye to mix. The resulting reaction causes the color of the material to change from yellow to red. The deeper the damage, the more intense the color change. This autonomous visual indicator can enable engineers to detect mechanical damage and intervene before a structure is compromised.

=== Smart materials ===
Sottos is involved in the development of self-sensing, mechano- and thermo- chemically active polymeric materials. These smart inorganic polymers belong to the class of smart materials, exhibiting stimuli-responsive functions. A specific input stimulus such as a change in force or temperature can trigger a desired change in one or more properties of the polymer.

==== Sensitivity to mechanical force ====
Mechanical force can provide a source of energy used by a desired chemical reaction. To create such materials, mechanically sensitive chemical groups called mechanophores are built into the chemical structure of the polymer. In one set of experiments, researchers used spiropyran molecules to detect mechanical stress. The spiropyran (SP) mechanophore was covalently bonded into a stretchy barbell-shaped polymer called polymethyl acrylate (PMA) and a small, glasslike bead-shaped polymer called polymethyl methacrylate (PMMA). SP transformed into a fluorescent merocyanine (MC) form in response to stress. The orientation of the MC subspecies relative to the tensile force could be characterized based on the anisotropy of the fluorescence polarization. Spiropyrans were normally colorless but turned vivid shades of red or purple when stressed. They also fluoresce. The researchers have also demonstrated that mechanical force can power a chemical response in the polymer, changing the covalent bonding. A next step in this research is to explore the potential to use mechanochemical reactions to activate chemical pathways in materials to respond to shock waves in positive ways, by altering or enhancing properties of the material.

==== Thermal sensitivity ====
Another area of research focuses on the prevention of thermal runaway in batteries. The researchers coated the anode or separator layer of the battery with microspheres sensitive to heat. An increase in temperature causes the microspheres to melt, blocking transmission of the lithium ions and causing the battery to shut down. Microspheres of both polyethylene and paraffin wax were tested with CR2032 Li-ion batteries and demonstrated both successful operation of the battery at normal temperatures and shutdown of the battery at temperatures below those at which the battery's separator would become damaged.

=== Thin films ===
Sottos has also been involved in research on thin films, and the measurement techniques for dynamic interfacial energy measurements of adhesion in multilayer thin films.

== Awards ==
Sottos has received numerous awards for her teaching and research. These include:

- The University of Delaware Presidential Citation for Outstanding Achievement (2002)
- The Hetényi Award from the Society for Experimental Mechanics (2004) for J. Wang, R. L. Weaver, N. R. Sottos "A parametric study of laser induced thin film spallation" Experimental Mechanics 42, no. 1 (2002): 74–83.
- The Hetényi Award from the Society for Experimental Mechanics (2016) for E.M.C. Jones, M.N. Silberstein, S.R. White, N.R. Sottos "In Situ Measurements of Strains in Composite Battery Electrodes during Electrochemical Cycling" Experimental Mechanics 54, no. 6 (2014): 971–985.
- Scientific American's SciAm 50 Award (2008)
- The M.M. Frocht and B.J. Lazan awards from the Society for Experimental Mechanics (2011)
- Tau Beta Pi Daniel C. Drucker Eminent Faculty Award (2014)
- The C.E. Taylor award from the Society for Experimental Mechanics (2020)
- National Academy of Engineering (2020)
- The W.M. Murray award and lecture from the Society for Experimental Mechanics (2021)
- American Academy of Arts and Sciences (2022)
- National Academy of Sciences (2022)

== Culture ==
Self-healing materials created by Sottos and others at the Beckman Institute were included in the exhibit Science Storms at the Museum of Science and Industry in Chicago in 2010.
