= Isaac M. Daniel =

American engineering scientist (1933–2026)

- Born: October 7, 1933
- Died: September 3, 2026 (aged 92)
- Education: Illinois Institute of Technology (PhD); Illinois Institute of Technology (MS); Illinois Institute of Technology (BS)
- Scientific career
- Fields: Mechanics; Composite Materials
- Workplaces: Northwestern University

Isaac Mordochai Daniel (October 7, 1933 – September 3, 2026) was a Greek-American engineer and academic.

== Education ==
Daniel attended the National Technical University of Athens in Greece. He received a B.S. in 1957, M.S. in 1959, and Ph.D. in 1964 in Civil Engineering from the Illinois Institute of Technology.

== Research and career ==
After completing his PhD, Daniel stayed on at IIT, managing the IIT Research Institute which he inherited from August J. Durelli and as a professor. In 1982 he moved to Northwestern University where he was the Walter P. Murphy professor and Director of the Center for Intelligent Processing of Composites. He was professor emeritus with Northwestern. His research encompassed composite materials, nondestructive evaluation, wave propagation, fracture mechanics, and nanotechnology. He was active in the Society for Experimental Stress Analysis and later renamed Society for Experimental Mechanics, being named an Honorary Member of the Society in 2007. He was a member of the European Academy of Sciences. In 2002, a symposium in his honor was held in conjunction with 14th U.S. National Congress of Theoretical and Applied Mechanics and the proceedings published in "Recent Advances in Experimental Mechanics - In Honor of Isaac M. Daniel.”

== Death ==
Daniel died on September 3, 2026, at the age of 92.

== Awards and recognition ==
- Society for Experimental Mechanics Hetényi (1969 & 1975)
- Society for Experimental Mechanics Fellow (1981)
- Society for Experimental Mechanics Lazan (1984)
- SEM Murray Lecture and Award (1998)
- American Society of Mechanical Engineers Fellow (1999)
- Society for Experimental Mechanics Frocht (2006)
- American Institute of Aeronautics and Astronautics Associate Fellow (2006)
- Society for Experimental Mechanics Theocaris (2007)
- Society for Experimental Mechanics Honorary Member (2007)
- American Society for Composites Fellow (2007)
- Society for Experimental Mechanics Taylor (2014)
- Medal of Excellence in Composite Materials (2014)
- American Academy of Mechanics Fellow
