= List of fellows of the Society for Experimental Mechanics =

The Society for Experimental Mechanics honors members with the designation of Fellow for having made significant accomplishments to the field of mechanics.

== 1975 ==
- D.C. Drucker
- M. Hetényi
- J.H. Meier
- F.G. Tatnall
- A.J. Durelli
- M.M. Leven
- W.M. Murray
- T.J. Dolan

The highest honor bestowed by the Society for Experimental Mechanics is the designation of Honorary Member, with a limit of ten living honorary members at any given time. From the first naming of Francis G. Tatnall as an Honorary Member in 1953 to the introduction of the rank of Fellow in 1975, a total of nine Honorary Members had been named. The inaugural class of Fellows consisted of all of the Honorary Members to that time with the exception of Max M. Frocht who had died the year before. The bylaws have since stipulated that anyone named Honorary Member who was not already named Fellow would be automatically given this distinction, although only Raymond D. Mindlin has since been named Fellow and Honorary Member in the same year.

== 1976 ==
- F.C. Bailey
- S.S. Manson
- R.E. Peterson
- P.K. Stein
- C.E. Taylor
- W.T. Bean
- F.J. McCormick
- C.R. Smith
- F.B. Stern
- F. Zandman

== 1977 ==
- G. Ellis
- C.C. Perry
- W. Ramberg
- B.E. Rossi
- J.C. Telinde
- A.S. Kobayashi
- D. Post
- W.F. Riley
- C.W. Smith
- D.K. Wright

== 1978 ==
- J.W. Dally
- A.E. Johnson
- E.O. Stitz
- M. Holt
- D.E. Niles
- W.F. Swinson

== 1979 ==
- J.W. Dalley
- R.H. Homewood
- L.S. Srinath
- D.J. DeMichele
- S.S. Redner
- P.S. Theocaris

== 1980 ==
- P.H. Adams
- L.J. Weymouth
- R.J. Sanford
- W.C. Young

== 1981 ==
- I.M. Daniel
- V.J. Parks
- J. Dorsey
- C.E. Work

== 1982 ==
- E.E. Day
- R.E. Rowlands
- E.I. Riegner
- C.A. Sciammarella

== 1983 ==
- F.P. Chiang
- W.L. Fourney
- T.D. Dudderar
- D.R. Harting

== 1984 ==
- C.W. Bert
- M.E. Fourney
- H.F. Brinson

== 1985 ==
- C.P. Burger
- K.G. McConnell
- G.R. Irwin
- W.F. Ranson

== 1986 ==
- K.H. Laermann
- R.D. Mindlin
- R. Mark
- J.T. Pindera

== 1987 ==
- N.J. Hoff
- M.L. Williams, Jr.
- W.G. Knauss
- C. Lipson

== 1988 ==
- J.F. Bell
- K.A. Stetson
- J. Der Hovanesian

== 1992 ==
- W.N. Sharpe, Jr.
- S.E. Swartz

== 1993 ==
- J.A. Gilbert
- T.C. Huang

== 1994 ==
- A. Shukla
- J.L. Turner

== 1995 ==
- I.M. Allison
- G.E. Maddux

== 1996 ==
- M. Nisida
- R. Prabhakaran

== 1997 ==
- T. Kunio
- S.P. Wnuk, Jr.
- J.B. Ligon

== 1998 ==
- M. Ramulu
- M.Y.Y. Hung
- J.F. Kalthoff

== 1999 ==
- Michael M. Lemcoe
- Michael A. Sutton
- Thomas W. Corby, Jr.

== 2000 ==
- K. Ravi-Chandar
- J. McKelvie
- Y.J. Chao

== 2001 ==
- G.L. Cloud
- J.F. Doyle
- R.J. Pryputniewicz

== 2002 ==
- R. Chona
- A. Lagarde

== 2003 ==
- C.T. Liu
- M. Takashi
- K.M. Liechti

== 2004 ==
- S.K. Foss
- E.E. Gdoutos

== 2005 ==
- Mark Tuttle
- W.C. Wang

== 2006 ==
- Bongtae Han
- Edwin K. P. Chong

== 2007 ==
- Eann Patterson
- S.C. "Max" Yen

== 2009 ==
- Igor Emri
- Horacio D. Espinosa
- Ares J. Rosakis

== 2010 ==
- Randall J. Allemang
- Yoshiharu Morimoto
- Jian Lu
- Guruswami Ravichandran

== 2011 ==
- José L.F. Freire
- Sia Nemat-Nasser
- Carmine Pappalettere
- Hareesh V. Tippur

== 2012 ==
- Edwin O'Brien
- Nancy Sottos
- Daniel Rittel

== 2013 ==
- K.T. Ramesh
- John Lambros
- David Brown
- Fabrice Pierron

== 2014 ==
- Archie A.T. Andonian
- Weinong (Wayne) Chen
- David J. Ewins
- Wolfgang Osten

== 2015 ==
- Hugh Bruck
- Wendy C. Crone
- Peter G. Ifju
- Ghatu Subhash

== 2016 ==
- Janice Dulieu-Barton
- K. Jane Grande-Allen
- Xiaodong Li
- Hongbing Lu

== 2017 ==
- Eric N. Brown
- Jon Rogers
- Daniel Inman

== 2018 ==
- Charles (Chuck) Farrar
- Michel Grédiac
- Francesco Lanza di Scalea
- Carlos Ventura

== 2019 ==
- Amos Gilat
- Yu-Lung Lo
- Tusit Weerasooriya
- Alan Zehnder

== 2020 ==
- Ioannis Chasiotis
- Phillip L. Reu
- Satoru Yoneyama
- Kristin Zimmerman

== 2021 ==
- Douglas Adams
- Francois Hild
- Yasushi Miyano
- Michael Prime

== 2022 ==
- Peter Avitabile
- Randall Mayes
- Vikas Prakash
- Gary Schajer
