= Daniel Post =

American engineering scientist (1929–2026)

- Born: April 1929; New York City, U.S.
- Died: January 25, 2026 (aged 96)
- Education: University of Illinois Urbana-Champaign (PhD)
- Scientific career
- Fields: Mechanics; Moire photoelasticity strain gauges
- Workplaces: Virginia Tech
- Thesis: (1957)

Daniel Post (April 1929 – January 25, 2026) was an American engineer and was a professor at the Virginia Tech.

== Education ==
Post studied at the Pratt Institute of New York from 1947 to 1948, completing his BS at the University of Illinois Urbana-Champaign in 1950. He received his MS in 1951 and PhD in 1957 in Theoretical and Applied Mechanics from the University of Illinois Urbana-Champaign. He was co-advised by Thomas J. Dolan and Charles E. Taylor, being Taylor's first graduate student.

== Research and career ==
Following his graduate studies, Post moved to Rensselaer Polytechnic Institute as an Adjunct Associate Professor, where he also held to the position of Associate Professor. He did work with Francis G. Tatnall and Vishay Intertechnology on the development of new strain gauges. He developed a unique production method for foil-tyle strain gauges in 1963. Throughout his career he consulted to government and industry. He was a professor at Virginia Polytechnic Institute and State University from 1978 to 1991 when he retired and became professor emeritus. He was one of the investigators on the 1969 Department of Defense Themis grant that served as the genesis of Virginia Tech's international leadership in composite and advanced materials. In 1979 he invented a white light Moire interferometry technique and later authored "High Sensitivity Moiré: Experimental Analysis for Mechanics and Materials", serving the major book on the topic of Moiré Interferometry. Post was active in the Society for Experimental Stress Analysis (SESA) (later the Society for Experimental Mechanics (SEM)) and was named the eighteenth Honorary Member of the society in 1999.

== Death ==
Post died on January 25, 2026, at the age of 96.

== Awards and recognition ==
- Society for Experimental Mechanics Murray Lecture and Award (1971)
- Society for Experimental Mechanics Fellow (1977)
- Society for Experimental Mechanics Frocht Award (1988)
- Virginia Polytechnic Institute & State University Alumni Research Award (1989)
- Royal Society of London Award (1995)
- Society for Experimental Mechanics Honorary Member (1999)
- Society for Experimental Mechanics Taylor (2006)
