= Albert S. Kobayashi =

American engineering scientist (born 1924)

Albert Satoshi Kobayashi
- Born: December 9, 1924 (age 101); Chicago, Illinois, U.S.
- Education: Illinois Institute of Technology (PhD) University of Washington (M.S.) University of Tokyo (B.S.)
- Scientific career
- Fields: Mechanics; Fracture; Elasticity
- Workplaces: University of Washington
- Thesis: (1958)
- Website: https://www.me.washington.edu/people/faculty/albert_kobayashi

Albert Satoshi Kobayashi (born December 9, 1924) is an American engineer and scientist.

== Early life and education ==
Kobayashi was born in Chicago on December 9, 1924. He graduated from the University of Tokyo with a bachelor's degree in 1947. He earned a master's degree from the University of Washington in 1952 and a doctorate in mechanics from the Illinois Institute of Technology in 1958.

== Research and career ==
From 1947 to 1950 Kobayashi worked as an engineer at Konishiroku Photo Industry in Japan. From 1953 to 1955 he worked as an engineer at Illinois Tool Works and from 1958 to 1975 at Boeing. He became an assistant professor in 1958 and later professor at the University of Washington. From 1988 to 1995 he was the Boeing Pennell Professor of Structural Analysis. He has been a professor emeritus in the Department of Mechanical Engineering since 1997. His research includes the mechanics of brittle fractures, experimental stress analysis, Moiré interferometry, elasticity theory, statics and dynamics of mechanical structures. In 1997 he received the Japanese Order of the Rising Sun. He was elected to the National Academy of Engineering in 1986, received the Japan Society for the Promotion of Science, and was a Fellow and an honorary member of the Society for Experimental Mechanics. From 1977 to 1984 he was Associate Editor of the Journal of Applied Mechanics. The International Conference on Computational & Experimental Engineering and Sciences named the Kobayashi Award after him. He was the president of the Society for Experimental Mechanics from 1989 to 1990.

== Awards and recognition ==
- National Academy of Engineering
- Fellow of the Japan Society for the Promotion of Science
- Fellow of the Society for Experimental Mechanics
- Honorary Member of the Society for Experimental Mechanics
- American Society of Mechanical Engineers Daniel C. Drucker Medal
- American Society of Mechanical Engineers Nadai Medal
- Society for Experimental Mechanics M.M. Frocht Award
- Society for Experimental Mechanics B.J. Lazan Award
- Society for Experimental Mechanics W.M. Murray Lecture Award
- Society for Experimental Mechanics F.G. Tatnall Award
- Society for Experimental Mechanics R.E. Peterson Award

== Translation ==
This article is based in part or in whole on a translation of this version of the German Wikipedia article Albert S. Kobayashi. The editors of the original article are listed in its page history. This indication merely indicates the origin of the wording and does not serve as a source for the information in this article.
