= Milton M. Leven =

American engineering scientist

- Born: June 8, 1911
- Died: April 22, 1979 (aged 67)
- Education: Carnegie Mellon University (M.S.) Carnegie Mellon University (B.S.)
- Scientific career
- Fields: Mechanics photoelasticity
- Workplaces: Westinghouse Research Laboratories

Milton Maxwell Leven (8 June 1911 — 22 April 1979) was an American engineer. He was an engineering and manager of Experimental Mechanics at Westinghouse Research Laboratories and held numerous service roles in the Society for Experimental Stress Analysis (SESA) (now Society for Experimental Mechanics) including as the president of the society from 1956 to 1957. He was born to Jacob Leven and Anna J Leven (born Walters) of Russian descent in Pennsylvania. He went by Milt.

== Education ==
Leven attended Carnegie Mellon University receiving a BS in electrical engineering in 1935 and MS in mechanics in 1940. While at Carnegie Mellon University he was an early, and one of the best, students of Max M. Froct.

== Research and career ==
After completing his MS at Carnegie Mellon University Leven continued on as an instructor and research assistant until 1942 when he joined the US Navy during World War II. Leven joined Westinghouse Research Laboratories in Pittsburgh, PA in 1946 where he was well known for leading a laboratory utilizing photoelastic stress analysis. He employed three dimensional photoelasticity for the development of nuclear reactor vessels and turbo-machinery components. He was promoted to fellow engineer 1954, advisory engineer in 1966 and to manager of experimental mechanics in 1967 until his retirement in 1977. He was the president of the Society for Experimental Stress Analysis (SESA) (now Society for Experimental Mechanics) from 1956 to 1957. He gave the SESA William M. Murray Lecture in 1972 . He was named the sixth honorary member of the society in 1969, a position held until his death in 1979. When SESA introduced the rank of Fellow, Leven was among the first class of SESA Fellows in 1975 along with the seven other living Honorary Members of the society.

== Awards and recognition ==
- Society for Experimental Mechanics Murray Lecture and Award (1952)
- Society for Experimental Mechanics Honorary Member (1968 to 1990)
- Society for Experimental Mechanics Tatnall Award (1972)
- Society for Experimental Mechanics Fellow (1975)
- Society for Experimental Mechanics Lazan Award (1979)
