= J. Hans Meier =

American engineering scientist (1913–2006)

- Born: 1913
- Died: 2006 (aged 92–93)
- Education: Massachusetts Institute of Technology (PhD)
- Scientific career
- Fields: Mechanics; Strain Gauge
- Workplaces: Bucyrus-Erie; General Electric Company; IBM
- Doctoral advisor: Arthur C. Ruge

Johann Hans Meier (1913–2006) was an American engineer who contributed to the development of the strain gauge.

== Education ==
Meier received a Diplom from the Federal Technical University in Switzerland and move the Massachusetts Institute of Technology in 1937. He obtained an MS working with William M. Murray. Meier continued on with Arthur C. Ruge on work investigating earthquake stress on elevated water tanks. This research led to the invention of the strain gauge concurrent with the work of Edward E. Simmons at the California Institute of Technology. Notably, the Massachusetts Institute of Technology Patent Committee did not feel that the commercial use is likely to be of major importance.

== Research and career ==
Meier left the Massachusetts Institute of Technology to work for Bucyrus-Erie where he applied strain gauge measurements on the long arms of Bucyrus-Erie's cranes and set up one of the first comprehensive industrial laboratories for experimental stress analysis. He moved to General Electric Company to Manage the Applied Mechanics Section of the General Engineering Laboratory, including work with Dominick J. DeMichele. In 1958 he moved to the IBM Development Laboratory in Vestal, New York until he finally retired in 1980. He was the president of the Society for Experimental Stress Analysis (SESA) (now Society for Experimental Mechanics) from 1950 to 1951. He was named the fourth honorary member of the society in 1968, a position held until his death in 2006. When SESA introduced the rank of Fellow, Meier was among the first class of SESA Fellows in 1975 along with the seven other living honorary members of the society.

== Awards and recognition ==
- Society for Experimental Mechanics Honorary Member (1968 to 2006)
- Society for Experimental Mechanics Tatnall Award (1971)
- Society for Experimental Mechanics Fellow (1975)
- Inventor of the Year Award by the Boston Museum of Science (1986)
