= Cesar Sciammarella =

Argentine civil engineer (born 1924)

- Born: August 22, 1924 (age 102); Buenos Aires, Argentina
- Education: University of Buenos Aires; Illinois Institute of Technology
- Occupation: Scientist
- Known for: Experimental Mechanics; Holographic interferometry Moire deflectometry
- Title: Emeritus Professor, Department of Mechanical, Materials and Aerospace Engineering Illinois Institute of Technology
- Spouse: Esther Sciammarella
- Children: Eduardo Sciammarella Federico Sciammarella
- Website: General Stress Optics

Cesar Augusto Sciammarella (born August 22, 1924) is an Argentine civil engineer who made significant contributions to the field of experimental mechanics. In the last decade, he has extended his pioneering developments in moiré, holography, and speckle interferometry methodologies down to the nanometer level. These efforts have enabled optics to be applied beyond the classical Rayleigh limit, reaching the nanometer range.

His research is widely used for 3D reconstruction and stress and strain analysis. In his Doctoral Thesis on the moiré method, he extended the Continuum Mechanics model originally developed by Dantu to large deformations. He developed fundamental equations on the properties of moiré fringes and sign conventions. This was an analysis of a non-elastic problem with the moiré method. Dr Sciammarella generalised the methods that measure displacements using Fourier analysis in the process of formation of the fringe images. He proved formally that the orders could be represented by real numbers instead of integers. In 1966, he presented a full model of the moiré fringes as phase modulated signals and provided a method to get displacements and strains for moiré and photo-elastic fringes. He introduced in the literature the Fourier method as a tool for fringe pattern analysis. His model is still used as a standard model in the fringe analysis method.

== Education ==
- Diploma in Civil Engineering, University of Buenos Aires, July 1950
- Ph.D., Illinois Institute of Technology, June 1960

Cesar Sciammarella received his diploma in Civil Engineering from the University of Buenos Aires in July 1950. After graduation, he worked as a professional engineer in different industries, including the Director of the Materials Testing Laboratories in the Metallurgy and Materials Division of the Atomic Energy Commission of Argentina. Later, he was invited by Dr A.J. Durelli to come to the US to get a PhD degree. He received his PhD from the Illinois Institute of Technology in June 1960. Upon graduation, he returned to the Argentine Atomic Energy Commission.

== Biography, professional life and work ==
From 1952 to 1957, Cesar was Professor of Physics at Argentine Army Engineering School. This was a period in Argentina under the democratically elected Juan Domingo Perón. The coup that brought down Perón's difficult republic was aided by officers from Argentine Army Engineering School. Although Cesar was not involved in the coup, he was detained and tortured during the uprising. Peron's government fell two weeks after his detention and he was able to escape. He spent several months fighting pneumonia caused by his detention.

Since 1962, he worked as an associate professor at the University of Florida, Gainesville, where he researched the moiré method and the Fourier method to analyze the contours and deformations of bodies. In 1967, he became professor at the Department of Aerospace and Applied Mechanics, Polytechnic Institute of Brooklyn. During this period, Sciammarella pioneered digital analysis of moiré fringes with the use of computers. In 1985, he further developed this methodology by putting together an optics and computer system for fringe pattern analysis. Later, he published a series of papers answering how far it is possible to recover fringe order information utilizing computer analysis. This work culminated in the paper Heisenberg Principle Applied to the Analysis of Speckle Interferometry Fringes.

Since 2005, Dr. Sciammarella, with his co-workers, succeeded in overcoming the Rayleigh limit. In recent work, measurements in the far field have been carried out in nano-crystals and nano-spheres with accuracies on the order of ±3.3 nm.

In 2012, Cesar Sciammarella and his son Dr. Federico Sciammarella co-authored Experimental Mechanics of Solids, a comprehensive textbook of the techniques used in experimental mechanics.

== Professional positions ==
=== Research, teaching positions ===
- 1972–2008 Professor, Illinois Institute of Technology, Department of Mechanical and Aerospace Engineering, Director of the Experimental Stress Analysis Laboratory
- 2003–2008 Professor, Politechnico di Bari Dipartimento di Ingegneria Meccanica e Gestionale, Bari, Italy.
- 1991–1999 Non-Resident Professor, University degli Studi, Nuoro, Italy
- 1967–1972 Professor, Polytechnic Institute of Brooklyn, Department of Aerospace, Applied Mechanics
- 1961–1967 Professor, University of Florida, Department of Mechanics
- 1956–1957 Professor, University of Buenos Aires, School of Engineering, Department of Physics
- 1952–1957 Professor of Physics, Argentine Army Engineering School

=== Visiting positions ===
- Polytechnic Institute of Milano, Milano, Italy, 1972, 1976.
- University of Cagliari, Cagliari, Italy, 1979.
- Polytechnic Institute of Lausanne, Lausanne, Switzerland, 1979.
- University of Poitiers, Poitiers, France, 1980.
- Polytechnic Institute of Bari, Bari, Italy, 1992, 1994, 1998, 2003 to 2008.

=== Honors and awards ===
- 2013. Honorary Member, In recognition of his eminent position in Experimental Mechanics, SEM.
- 2011. Fylde Electronics Prize, BSSM. Best paper published in the Journal Strain in 2010.
- 2011 P.S. Theocaris award in recognition of pioneering efforts in Optical Methods SEM.
- 2001. Elected to deliver the 2001 Murray lecture, Society for Experimental Mechanics.
- 2000. Nominated Life Honorary Member of Italian Association of Stress Analysis.
- 1999. Prize for the paper entitled “Holographic Interferometry Applied to the Solution of a shell problem” has been selected, by the International Society for Optical Engineering to be included in a volume of the SPIE Milestone Series of Selected Papers in the field of Holography.
- 1998. Special award for Services to the Society for Experimental Mechanics.
- 1998. Paper entitled “Holographic Moiré, an Optical Tool for the Determination of Displacements, Strains, Contours and Slope of Surfaces”, has been selected, by the International Society for Optical Engineering to be included in a volume of the SPIE Milestone Series of Selected Papers in the field of Holography.
- 1997. Nominated Life Fellow of the Society of Mechanical Engineers.
- 1991. Lazan Award, for outstanding original contributions in Experimental Mechanics, Society for Experimental Mechanics.
- 1982. Fellow, Society for Experimental Mechanics.
- 1982. Hetenyi Award for the best paper in Experimental Mechanics, Holographic Moiré in Real Time, Society for Experimental Mechanics.
- 1980. Frocht Award, which recognizes outstanding educators in the field of experimental mechanics, Society for Experimental Stress Analysis.
- 1972. Award for distinguished services to the Applied Mechanics Reviews, American Society of Mechanical Engineers.
- 1970. Academy of Mechanics, Special volume 1970, “Moiré Holographic Technique for Three-Dimensional Stress Analysis,” selected as one of the outstanding papers published in the area of mechanics by resident authors in the Americas.
- 1966. Sigma Xi Faculty Research Award for Achievements in the Field of Engineering, (Florida Chapter).
