= Michael E. Fourney =

American engineering scientist

- Born: January 30, 1936 (age 90)
- Education: California Institute of Technology (PhD); California Institute of Technology (MS); West Virginia University (BS)
- Scientific career
- Fields: Mechanics; Photoelasticity; Moire
- Workplaces: University of California, Los Angeles
- Thesis: I. On the application of a laser to high speed photography. II. Torsional magnetoelastic waves in a circular cylinder. (1963)

Michael E. Fourney is an American registered professional engineer and professor.

== Education ==
Fourney earned his BS in aeronautical engineering from West Virginia University in 1958. He received his MS in 1960 and PhD in 1963 at the California Institute of Technology working with Albert T. Ellis.

== Research and career ==
After graduate school Fourney took a position at the University of Washington. He moved to the University of California, Los Angeles in 1972 holding positions of professor, department chair and chair of the faculty. His work in applied solids and fluid mechanics topics utilized a wide range of optical techniques. Since retiring in 1994, he has held the position of professor emeritus in civil and environmental engineering at the University of California, Los Angeles and also runs Fourney Eng., Inc.. He was active in the Society for Experimental Stress Analysis and later renamed Society for Experimental Mechanics, serving as president from 1980 to 1981. Fourney was named an Honorary Member of the Society for Experimental Mechanics in 2001. He been very active and supportive of the SEM Educational Foundation.

== Awards and recognition ==
- Society for Experimental Mechanics Lazan (1975)
- Society for Experimental Mechanics Fellow (1984)
- American Society of Mechanical Engineers Fellow (1987)
- SEM Murray Lecture and Award (1990)
- Society for Experimental Mechanics Tatnall (1996)
- Society for Experimental Mechanics Honorary Member (2001)
- Society for Experimental Mechanics Taylor (2004)
- American Academy of Mechanics Fellow
