= C. W. Smith (engineer) =

American engineering scientist (1926–2012)

- Born: January 1, 1926
- Died: July 30, 2012 (aged 86)
- Education: Virginia Tech (MS); Virginia Tech (BS)
- Scientific career
- Fields: Mechanics photoelasticity fracture mechanics
- Workplaces: Virginia Tech

Charles William Smith (January 1, 1926 – July 30, 2012) was an American engineer and professor.

== Education ==
Smith earned a BS in Civil Engineering in 1947 and an MS in Applied Mechanics in1950 from Virginia Polytechnic Institute and State University.

== Research and career ==
Smith became a full-time instructor in 1948 while working on his master's degree. He was promoted to assistant professor in 1950 upon completing his degree. At the time Virginia Tech was strictly a teaching institution and Smith pushed for a stronger role of performing research. Following a seminar from George Rankine Irwin, Smith became interested in fracture mechanics and applying photoelasticity. He was one of the investigators on the 1969 Department of Defense Themis grant that served as the genesis of Virginia Tech's international leadership in composite and advanced materials. He retired in 1992 and became an Alumni Distinguished Professor Emeritus. Smith was named an Honorary Member of the Society for Experimental Mechanics in 2002, a position held until his death in 2012.

== Awards and recognition ==
- Society for Experimental Mechanics Fellow (1977)
- Virginia Tech Alumni Award for Excellence in Research (1977)
- Society for Experimental Mechanics Frocht (1983)
- NASA's Langley Research Center Scientific Achievement Award (1986)
- American Academy of Mechanics Fellow (1991)
- Dan Pletta Engineering Educator of the Year Award from the Virginia Schools of Engineering (1991)
- Society for Experimental Mechanics Murray Lecture and Award (1993)
- Society for Experimental Mechanics Lazan (1995)
- American Society of Mechanical Engineers Fellow (1997)
- Society for Experimental Mechanics Tatnall (1997)
- Society for Experimental Mechanics Honorary Member (2002 to 2012)
- Virginia Tech Academy of Engineering Excellence (2006)
- Society for Experimental Mechanics Taylor (2010)
