= William F. Riley (engineer) =

American engineering scientist (1925–2000)

- Born: March 1, 1925
- Died: January 6, 2000 (aged 74)
- Education: Illinois Institute of Technology (MS); Carnegie Institute of Technology (BS)
- Scientific career
- Fields: Mechanics
- Workplaces: Iowa State University

William Franklin Riley (March 1, 1925 – January 6, 2000) was an American engineer and academic.

== Education ==
Riley earned a BS in mechanical engineering from the Carnegie Institute of Technology in 1951 where he took classes from Max M. Frocht and MS in mechanics from Illinois Institute of Technology in 1958 with August J. Durelli.

== Research and career ==
Riley served as lieutenant colonel United States Army Air Force from 1943 to 1946 as a bomber pilot over Germany during World War II. After completing his BS at the Carnegie Institute of Technology, he worked at the Mesta Machine Company in Pennsylvania as a mechanical engineer from 1951 to 1954. He worked as a research engineer at the Armour Research Foundation during and after his MS studies at IIT from 1954 to 1961. He then continued on as a section manager at the IIT Research Institute 1961 to 1966. He spent most of his career as a professor at the Iowa State University from 1966 until he retired as an emeritus professor in 1989. He was active in the Society for Experimental Stress Analysis and later renamed Society for Experimental Mechanics. He contributed to seminal books in the fields of mechanics, including Introduction to Photomechanics with August J. Durelli and Experimental Stress Analysis with James W. Dally. Riley was named an Honorary Member of the Society for Experimental Mechanics in 1984, a position held until his death in 2000.

== Awards and recognition ==
- Society for Experimental Mechanics Fellow (1977)
- Society for Experimental Mechanics Frocht (1977)
- Society for Experimental Mechanics Honorary Member (1984-2000)
