= Susan K. Foss =

American engineering scientist

- Education: Michigan Technological University (M.S) Michigan State University (M.S.) Michigan State University (B.S.)
- Scientific career
- Fields: Mechanics
- Workplaces: Deere and Company

Susan K. Foss (born December 24, 1941, in Traverse City, Michigan) was an American engineer. She worked at Deere and Company throughout her career and held numerous service roles in the Society for Experimental Mechanics, including serving as the society's first female president from 1998 to 1999. She died on January 24, 2013.

== Education ==
Foss earned her bachelor's and master's degrees in mathematics from Michigan State University. In 1967 she attended Michigan Technological University until 1975 when she received a master's degree and ABD in engineering mechanics.

== Research and career ==
Foss worked for Fairbanks-Morse Corporation in Beloit, Wisconsin as part of an advanced research and design team between her time at Michigan State University and Michigan Technological University. She worked for Deere and Company, starting as a project engineer in 1975 in Waterloo, Iowa. In 1980, she transferred to Moline, where she continued as an engineer for Deere and Company until her retirement in 2006. Foss was a 40-year member of the Society for Experimental Mechanics (SEM) serving as the treasurer from 1991 to 1994 and first female president of the society from 1998 to 1999. She played a seminal role in the development of Experimental Techniques from its start as a newsletter for the Society for Experimental Stress Analysis (SESA) (later known as SEM) in the mid-1970s to a full magazine in the early 1980s, and ultimately an archival peer-reviewed technical journal. Foss was appointed as Experimental Techniques's first technical editor from 1985 to 1987 and a second term from 2001 to 2003. She was a long-serving associate technical editor for the journal and was named Editor Emeritus in 2012.

== Awards and recognition ==
- Society for Experimental Mechanics Tatnall Award (1995)
- Society for Experimental Mechanics Brewer Award (1999)
- SEM Fellow (2004)
