= Raymond D. Mindlin =

American mechanical engineer (1906–1987)

- Born: Raymond David Mindlin; September 17, 1906; New York City, U.S.
- Died: November 22, 1987 (aged 81); Hanover, New Hampshire, U.S.
- Education: Columbia College, Columbia University (BA); Columbia University School of Engineering and Applied Science (BS)
- Occupation: Mechanical engineer
- Awards: Medal for Merit (1946); Theodore von Karman Medal (1961); Timoshenko Medal (1964); ASME Medal (1976); National Medal of Science (1979)

Raymond David Mindlin (New York City, 17 September 1906 – 22 November 1987) was an American mechanical engineer, Professor of Applied Science at Columbia University, and recipient of the 1946 Presidential Medal for Merit and many other awards and honours. He is known as mechanician, who made seminal contributions to many branches of applied mechanics, applied physics, and engineering sciences.

== Biography ==
=== Education ===
In 1924 he enrolled at Columbia University, where he received a B.A. in 1928, followed by a B.S. in 1931, and in 1932 by a C.E. and the Illig medal for "proficiency in scholarship." During his graduate study, Mindlin attended a series of summer courses organized by Stephen Timoshenko in 1933, '34, and '35, and there is no doubt that the experience at the University of Michigan served to confirm him in his choice of his life's work.

=== Career ===
For his doctoral research Mindlin set himself a fundamental problem in theoretical elasticity: determining the stresses in an elastic half-space subjected to a sub-surface point load. The results, nowadays referred to as "Mindlin's problem", represent a generalization of the two classical 19th century solutions respectively associated with the names of Kelvin and Boussinesq, and have become the basis for analytical formulations widely employed in geotechnical engineering. His paper was published in Physics (now the Journal of Applied Physics) in 1936, the year Mindlin received his Ph.D. degree.

Mindlin remained an assistant for another two years, at which point he was elevated to instructor in civil engineering, and only in 1940 did he receive promotion to assistant professor.

In 1942 Mindlin was co-opted by the Applied Physics Laboratory in Silver Spring, Maryland, an institution engaged in naval ordnance work, where he contributed in the development of the proximity fuze. For his part in its success, he was presented with the Presidential Medal for Merit.

He came back to Columbia in 1945 as an associate professor, and two years later attained the rank of professor. In 1967 he was appointed James Kip Finch Professor of Applied Science until his retirement in 1975. The Department of Civil Engineering and Engineering Mechanics established the Mindlin Lecture to honor his pioneering contributions to the field of applied mechanics.

Mindlin died on November 22, 1987, in Hanover, New Hampshire.

=== Awards and honors ===
Early awarded

- Naval Ordnance Development Award (1945)
- Presidential Medal for Merit (1946)
- Fellow, American Academy of Arts and Sciences (1958)
- Research Prize (1958) of the ASCE

In the 1960s

- Great Teacher Award (1960) from Columbia University
- von Karman Medal of the ASCE (1961)
- W. M. Murray Lecture and Award, SESA (now SEM) (1962)
- Fellow, ASME (1962)
- Fellow, Acoustical Society of America (1963)
- Timoshenko Medal (1964) of the American Society of Mechanical Engineers (ASME)
- Member, National Academy of Engineering (1966)
- C. B. Sawyer Award of the Army Electronics Command (1967)
- SEM/SESA Founder Award (1969)
- Honorary Member, ASME (1969)

In the 1970s

- Egleston Medal (1971) from Columbia University
- Trent-Crede Award of the Acoustical Society of America (1971)
- Member, National Academy of Sciences (1973)
- Frocht Award of the SESA (1974)
- Honorary D.Sc. degree from Northwestern University (1975)
- The ASME Medal (1976)
- National Medal of Science, (1979)

In the 1980s

- Fellow, Society for Experimental Mechanics (SEM) (1986)
- Honorary Member, SEM (1986)

== Work ==
=== Contributions to research ===
The Collected Papers of Raymond D. Mindlin (2 vols, Springer-Verlag, 1989) collected 129 papers authored or co-authored by Mindlin. The major contributions of Mindlin were summarized in 8 papers by his students and friends in a book dedicated to his retirement, R.D. Mindlin and Applied Mechanics (Pergamon, 1974). These include:

- Photoelasticity and experimental mechanics
- Classical three-dimensional elasticity (e.g., Mindlin's problem)
- Generalized elastic continua (Strain-gradient and couple-stress theory)
- Frictional contact and granular media
- Waves and vibrations in isotropic and anisotropic plates (Mindlin's Plate Theory)
- Wave propagation in rods and cylinders
- Theory of electro-elasticity and piezoelectric crystal resonators
- Crystal lattice theories

=== Service ===
Mindlin served with devotion the profession which he made his life's work, through his research, his teaching, his advisory capacity to numerous government agencies, and his activities in various scientific and technical societies. Among the latter, mention is warranted of the following positions he held at various times:

- In the American Society of Mechanical Engineers (ASME), chairman, Applied Mechanics Division; member, Publications Committee, Engineering Societies Monographs Committee, Advisory Board of Applied Mechanics Reviews.
- In the American Society of Civil Engineers (ASCE), chairman, Committee on Applied Mechanics of the Structural Engineering Division (precursor of the Engineering Mechanics Division).
  - ASCE established the Raymond D. Mindlin Medal in his honor in 2008.
- In the Society for Experimental Stress Analysis (SESA) (now the Society for Experimental Mechanics (SEM)), co-founder and president (1956-1947); member, executive committee. He is considered one of the four founding members of the society along with Miklós Hetényi, Charles Lipson, and William M. Murray.
- In the American Institute of Physics, associate editor, Journal of Mathematical Physics.

Also, he was member of: the U.S. National Committee for Theoretical and Applied Mechanics; the General Assembly of the International Union of Theoretical and Applied Mechanics (IUTAM); the American Physical Society.
