= C.R. Smith (engineer) =

American engineering scientist

Clarence R. Smith
- Education: Stanford University
- Scientific career
- Fields: Mechanics fatigue
- Workplaces: General Dynamic

Clarence R. Smith was a Structures Design Specialist in the Fatigue Laboratory at General Dynamics/Convair.

== Education ==
Smith studied physics at Stanford University.

== Research and career ==
Smith joined Convair in 1941, working extensively in the area of fatigue with a focus on aluminum aircraft structures. He contributed work on fatigue in support of the US Air Force, US Navy, and NASA. Smith was an early adopter of photoelasticity to determining stress concentrations due to notches, corner fillets, and holes in materials. He was an active member if the Society for Experimental Stress Analysis (later the Society for Experimental Mechanics) serving on the Executive Committee from 1953 to 1955, and the American Society for Testing Materials. He was the second recipient of the SESA Tatnall award after Frank Tatnall.

== Awards and recognition ==
- Society for Experimental Mechanics Tatnall (1969)
- Society for Experimental Mechanics Fellow (1976)
