= Fred C. Bailey =

American engineering scientist (1925–2021)

- Born: October 5, 1925
- Died: January 21, 2021 (aged 95)
- Education: Massachusetts Institute of Technology (BS, MS)
- Scientific career
- Fields: Mechanics
- Workplaces: Teledyne

Fred C. Bailey (October 5, 1925 – January 21, 2021) was an American engineer.

== Education ==
Bailey earned a BS and MS in engineering from the Massachusetts Institute of Technology.

== Research and career ==
Bailey served as an electrician's mate in the Navy, in the midst of his college studies. After MIT he took a position at Caterpillar Tractor Company and then moved to the National Research Council of the Academy of Science. In 1955 he moved to Boston to take a position with Lessells and Associates where he rose to the position of president. As president he guided Lessells and Associates through its acquisition by Teledyne. He retired as President of Teledyne Engineering Services in 1986. He was a President of the Society for Experimental Stress Analysis (SESA) (now Society for Experimental Mechanics) from 1967 to 1969. Bailey was named an Honorary Member of the Society in 1992, a position held until his death in 2021.

== Awards and recognition ==
- Society for Experimental Mechanics Fellow (1976)
- Society for Experimental Mechanics Tatnall (1974)
- Society for Experimental Mechanics Honorary Member (1992 to 2021)
