= Jane Grande-Allen =

American bioengineer

Katie Jane Grande-Allen (born December 15) is an American bioengineer currently the Isabel C. Cameron Professor at Rice University. She is currently chair of the Department of Bioengineering at Rice University. Her research focuses on an engineering approach to heart disease.

== Early life and education ==
Grande-Allen earned her Bachelor of Arts in Mathematics and Biology from Transylvania University. She then moved to the University of Washington for her Phd in Bioengineering. She subsequently conducted her postdoctoral fellowship in biomedical engineering with the Cleveland Clinic Foundation.

== Career ==
Grande-Allen joined the faculty at Rice University in 2003 and began conducting research on the biochemical composition of heart valves in patients with congestive heart failure. She earned the 2011 A.J. Durelli Award by the Society for Experimental Mechanics Inc. as a result of her experimental test on tissue function, strength, growth and abnormalities.

By 2011, she earned the Established Investigator Award from the American Heart Association and received a $1.2 million grant from the National Institutes of Health to research replacement heart valves. A few years later, she was elected a Fellow of the American Association for the Advancement of Science for her contributions to the field of heart-valve biomechanics and mechanobiolog.

In 2017, Grande-Allen was chosen to replace Rebecca Richards-Kortum as director of the Rice Institute of Biosciences and Bioengineering. In the same year, she was elected a Fellow of the Biomedical Engineering Society and named chair of the bioengineering department.

She has also been elected a Fellow of the American Heart Association and Society for Experimental Mechanics.
