= Emmanuel Gdoutos =

Greek academic

Emmanuel E. Gdoutos
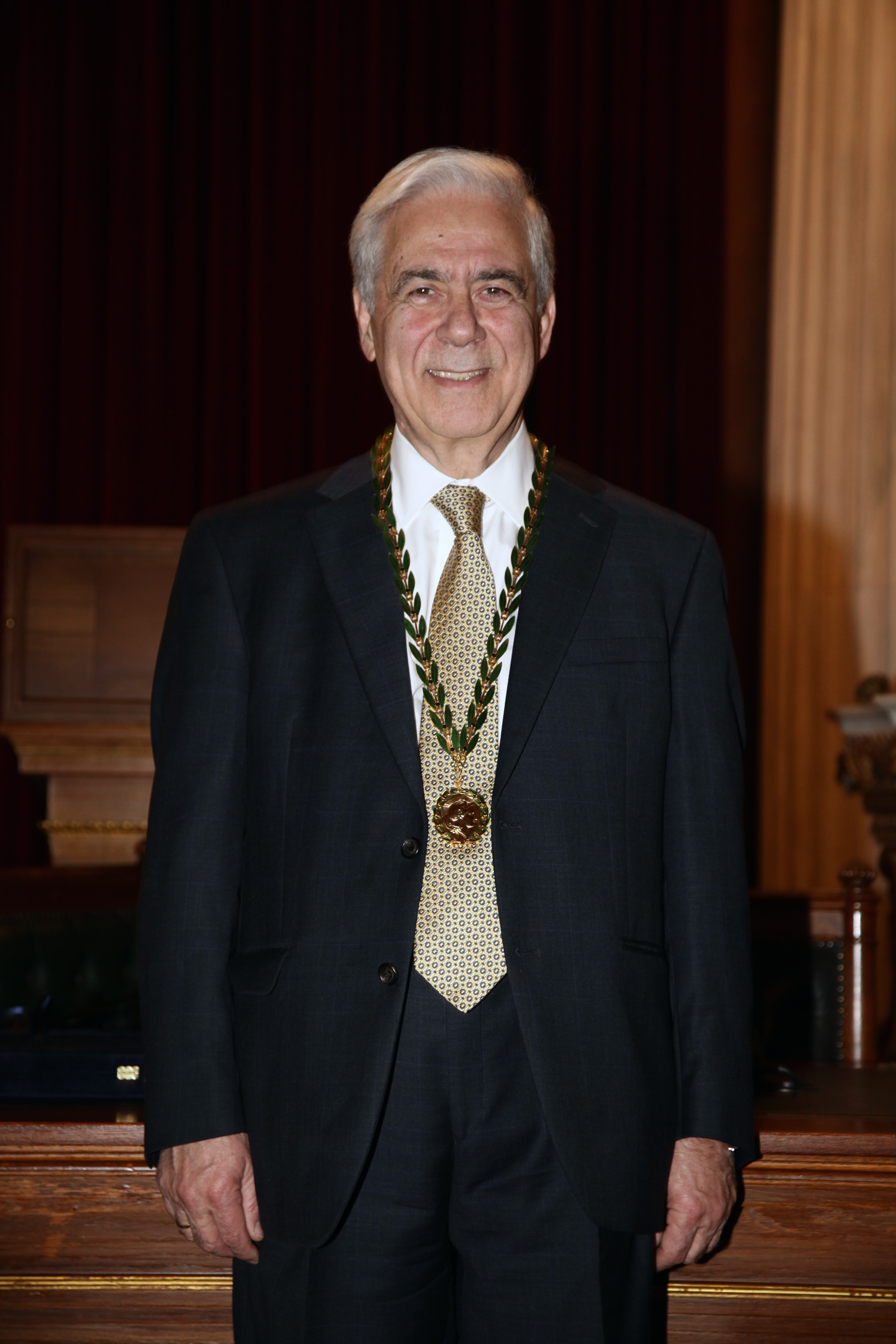
- Born: June 2, 1948 (age 78)
- Known for: Fracture mechanics, experimental mechanics
- Spouse: Maria Konsta
- Children: Eleftherios; Alexandra-Kalliopi

Academic background
- Education: National Technical University of Athens

Emmanuel E. Gdoutos (Greek: Εμμανουήλ Ε. Γδούτος, born June 2, 1948) is a Greek academic, Professor Emeritus at the Democritus University of Thrace and Full Member of the Academy of Athens. He has worked in experimental mechanics, fracture mechanics, composite materials, and sandwich structures. His main scientific accomplishments include the solution of many problems of crack growth under combination of opening-mode and sliding-mode loading which were published in his book: “Problems of Mixed-Mode Crack Propagation." His contributions have been widely recognized worldwide through membership and leadership in scientific societies, national academies and honorary diplomas and awards.

== Early life and career ==
Gdoutos was born on June 2, 1948, in Mytilene, Greece. He earned his Diploma in Civil Engineering in 1971 and his PhD in Applied Mechanics in 1973, both from the National Technical University of Athens. Gdoutos has been married to Maria Konsta-Gdoutos since 1984. Gdoutos and Maria Konsta-Gdoutos have two children, Eleftherios Gdoutos and Alexandra-Kalliopi Gdoutou.

Gdoutos is a Full Member of the Academy of Athens since 2016. He served as Professor and Director of the Laboratory of Applied Mechanics (1977-2015), and as Chair of the Department of Civil Engineering of the Democritus University of Thrace (1987-1989). Gdoutos has held numerous academic appointments internationally, serving as the Distinguished Clark Millikan Professor at the California Institute of Technology (2013-2016) and as Visiting Professor at Northwestern University, Lehigh University, the University of California, Davis, the University of California, Santa Barbara, and the University of Toledo.

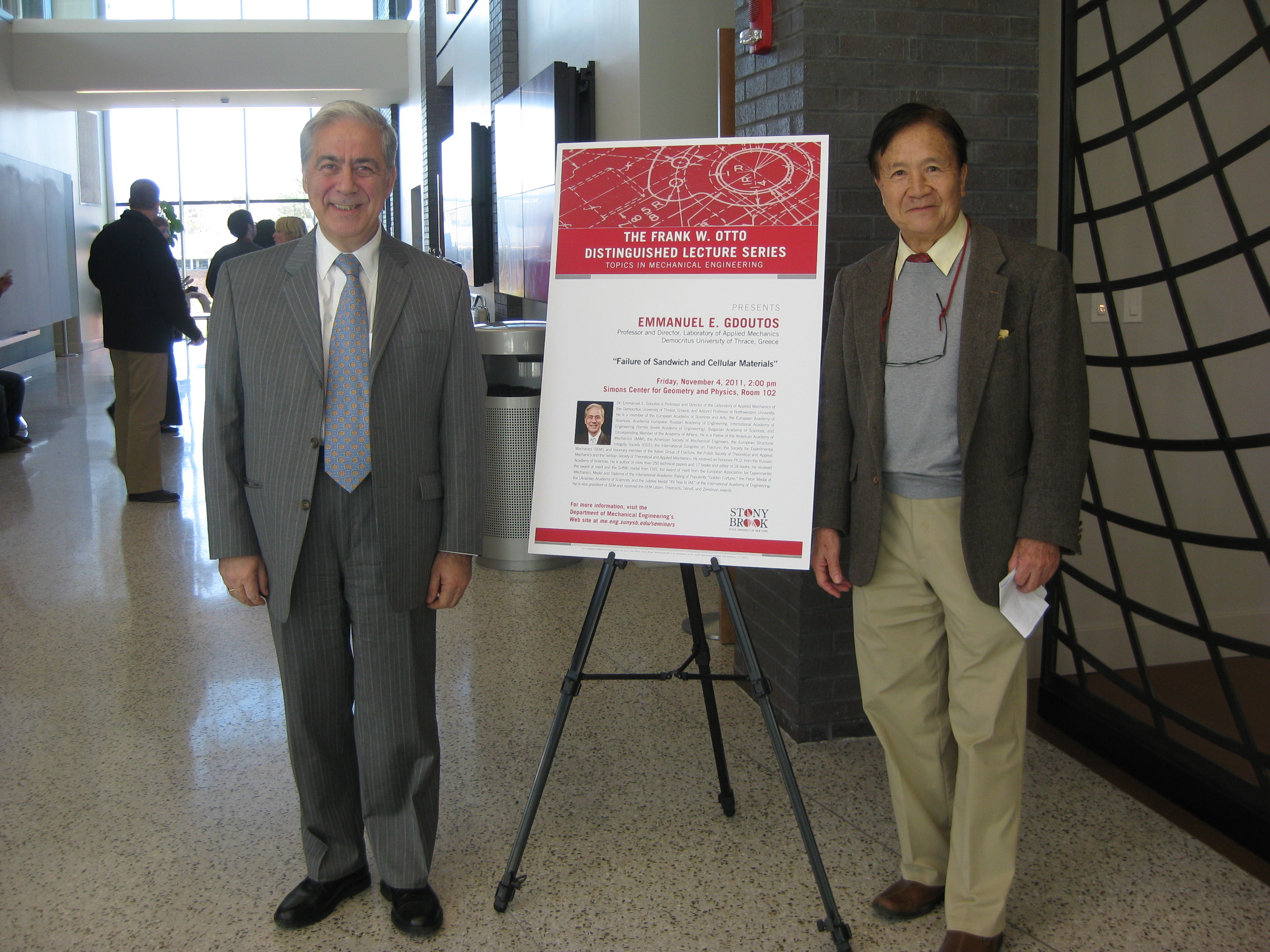
Gdoutos with Professor Fu-pen Chiang of Stony Brook university at the delivering of the honorary Frank Otto lecture.

He promoted the Greek-Ukrainian relations by implementing technical exchange in the field of solid mechanics and organizing and participating in bi-lateral conferences between the two nations in Lviv, Ukraine and Xanthi, Greece.

He is Archon, Teacher of the Nation, of the Greek Orthodox Patriarchate of Alexandria and All Africa. He serves as President of the Hellenic Society of Linguistic Heritage and the Theocaris Foundation of the Academy of Athens

On the occasion of the 16th European Conference of Fracture he presented the opening ceremony address in English using only words of Greek origin.

== Research interests ==
Gdoutos's research interest include experimental mechanics, fracture mechanics, advanced composite materials, sandwich construction, and nanotechnology. He is the author of 16 books, 135 papers in refereed journals, 136 papers in conference proceedings, and editor of 25 books. He presented solution to the problem of stable crack growth under elastoplastic conditions. He analyzed the three-dimensional nature of the stress field at crack tips by the optical method of caustics and studied the residual stresses in ceramic composites. Besides, he presented solutions for the stress and failure behavior of brittle matrix composites. He analyzed the nonlinear behavior and failure mechanisms of sandwich structures and foam materials under various loading conditions. He analyzed the fatigue and failure behavior of tire rubber, and studied the processing and characterization of clay/epoxy nanocomposites. He developed the equations of caustics for the general case of a surface in space and developed a method for the study of the topography of the surface from its corresponding caustics by illuminating the surface by a parallel, convergent or divergent light beam. He presented solutions to the problem of stress singularity at the apex of two wedges fully bonded or sliding.

== Membership in National Academies ==
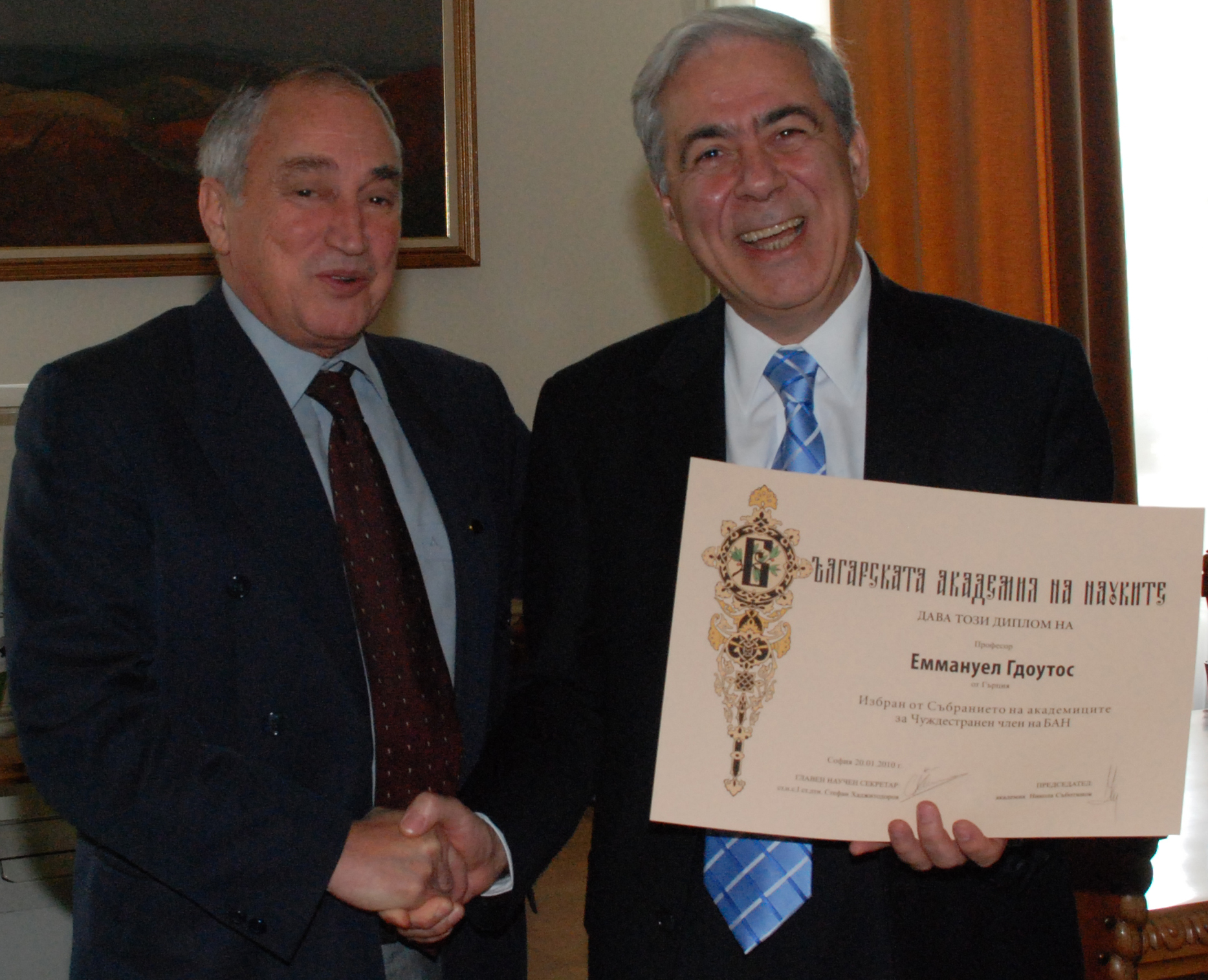
Gdoutos receiving the diploma of foreign member of the Bulgarian Academy of Sciences from the President of the Academy.

- Full Member of the Academy of Athens, 2016
- Foreign Member of the Russian Academy of Sciences, 2016
- Foreign Member of the Bulgarian Academy of Sciences, 2010
- Foreign Member of the Ukrainian National Academy of Sciences, 2021
- Member of the International Academy of Engineering (former Academy of Engineering of USSR), 2010
- Foreign Member of the Russian Academy of Engineering, 2009
- Member of Academia Europaea, 2008
- Fellow of the European Academy of Sciences, 2008, Chair of the Scientific Committee of the Division of Engineering, 2010-2016
- Fellow of the American Academy of Mechanics, 2007
- Corresponding Member of the Academy of Athens, Greece, 2007
- Member of the European Academy of Sciences and Arts, 2001
- Fellow of New York Academy of Sciences, 2001

== Fellowships ==
- Fellow of the American Association for the Advancement of Science (AAAS), 2012
- Fellow of the European Structural Integrity Society (ESIS), 2008
- Fellow of the European Society for Experimental Mechanics (EURASEM), 2010
- Fellow of the International Congress on Fracture (ICF), 2009
- Fellow of the Society for Experimental Mechanics (SEM), 2004
- Fellow of the American Society of Mechanical Engineers (ASME), 1993

== Awards and honours ==
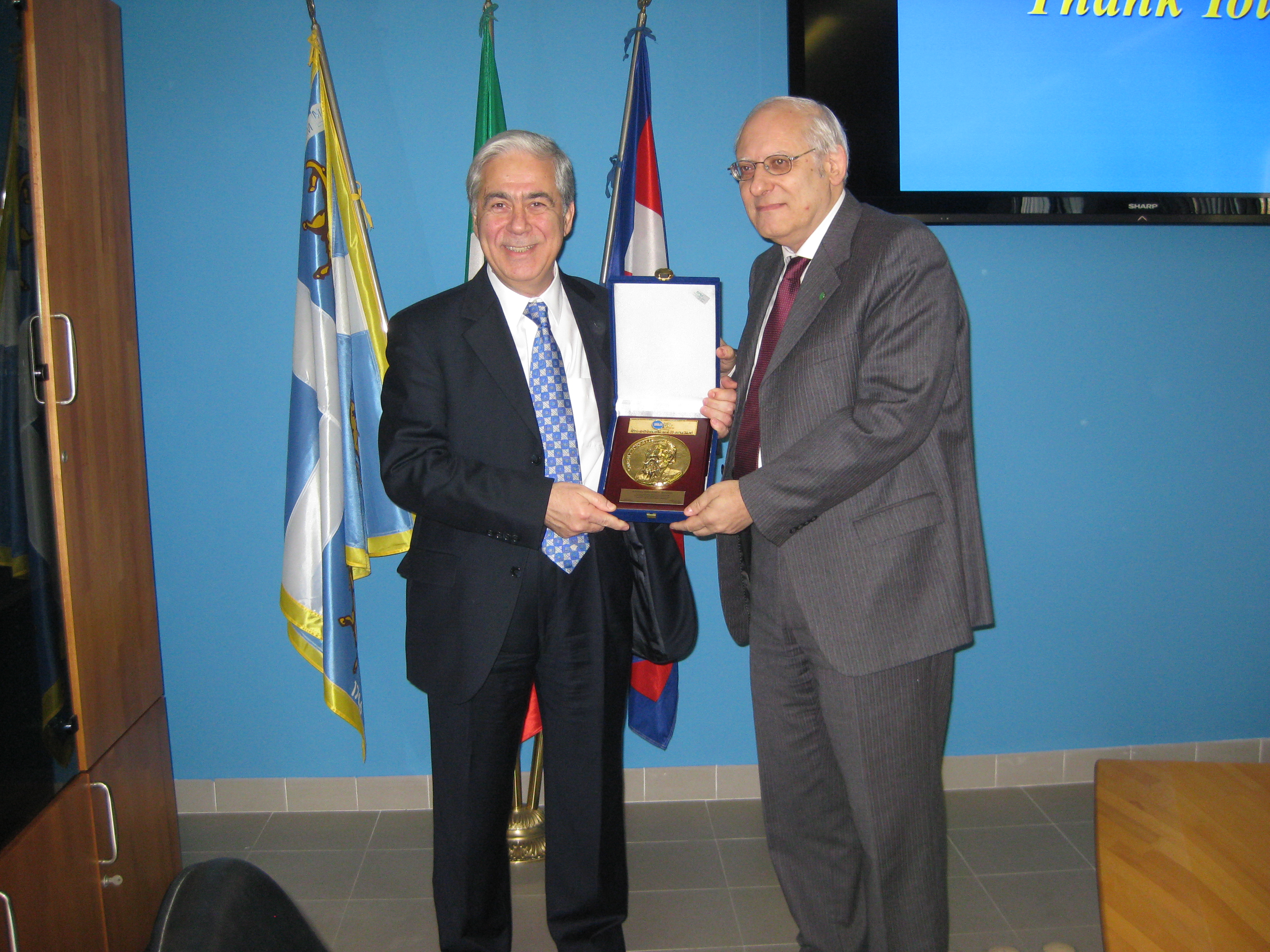
Gdoutos receiving the “Colonnetti Gold Medal 2012,” from the president of the Italian Research Institute of Metrology (INRIM) Prof. Alberto Carpinteri

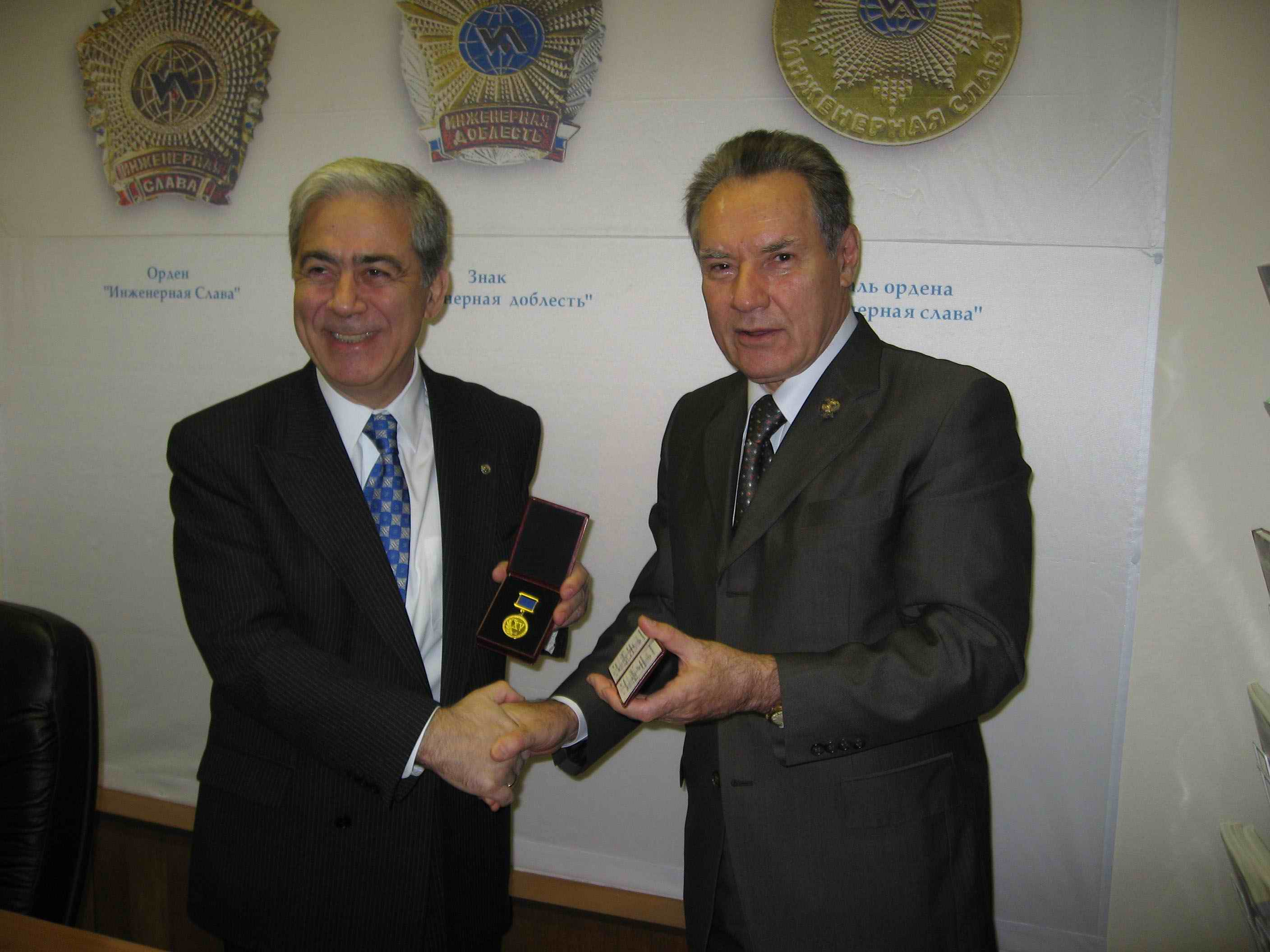
Gdoutos receiving the medal of member of the Russian Academy of Engineering from President of the Academy Professor B. Gusev

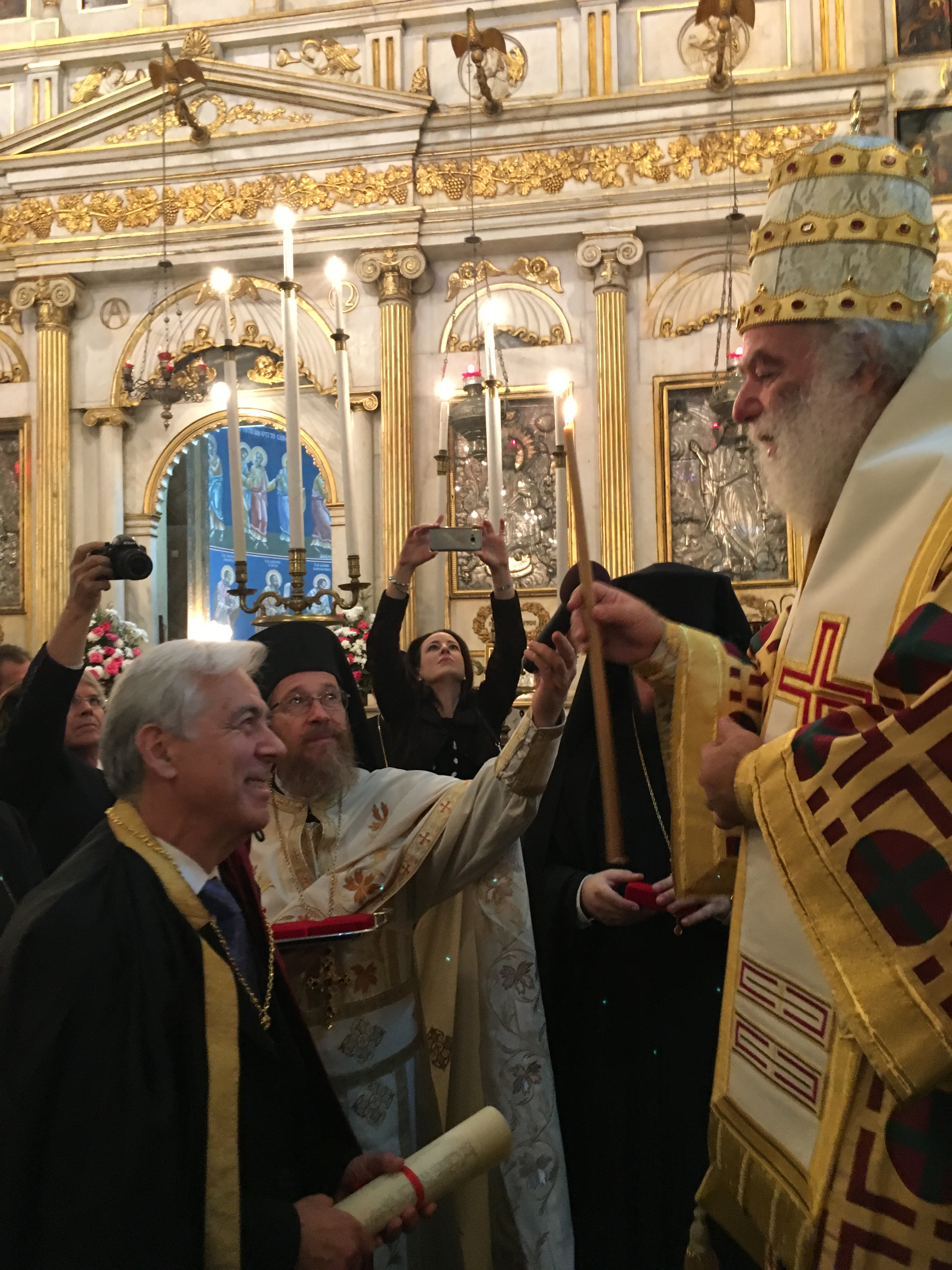
Gdoutos receiving the honorary title: "Archon, Teacher of the Nation," from the Patriarch of Alexandria and all Africa, 2018

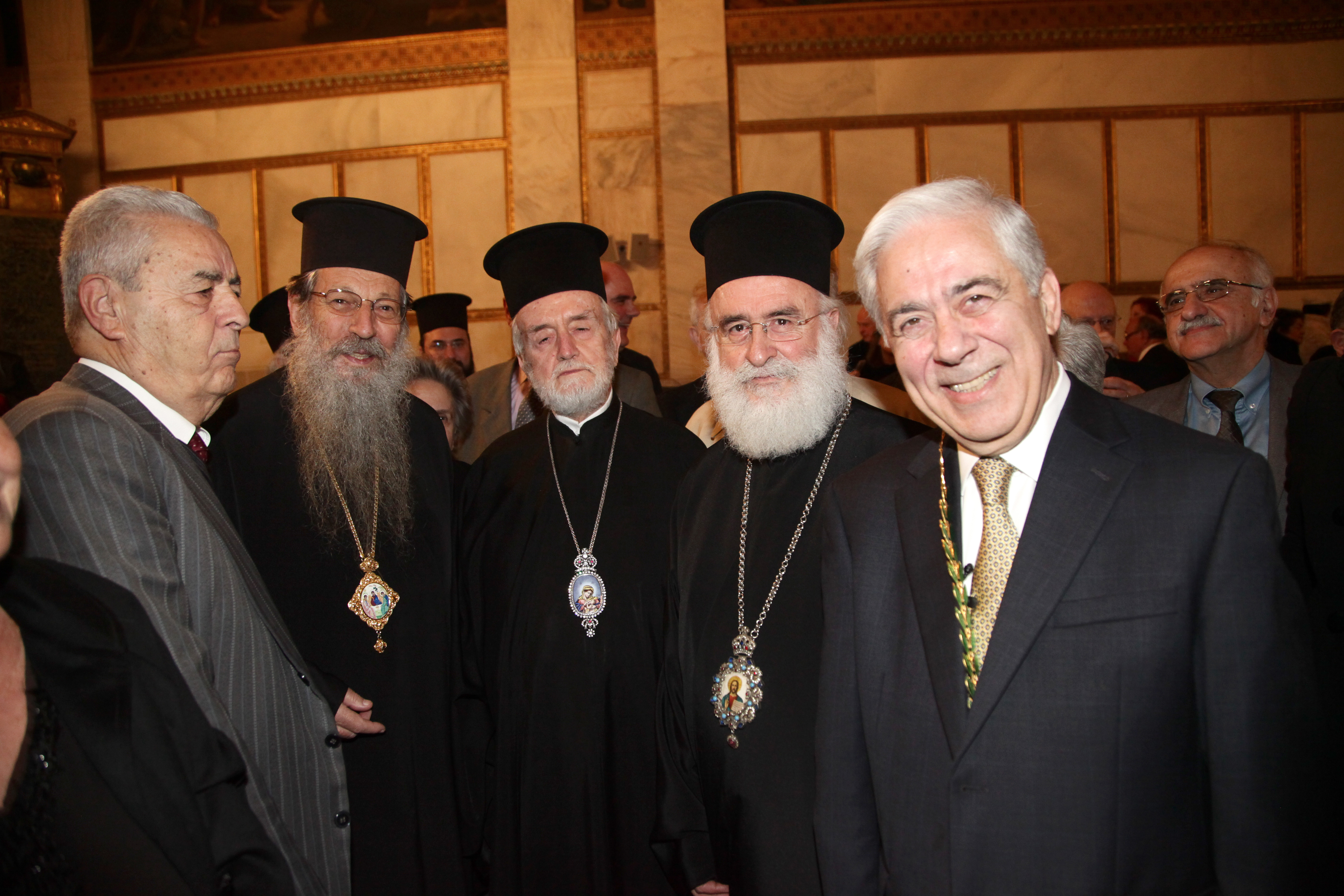
Gdoutos with Bishop of Mytilini Iakovos, Bishop of Pergamou - Academician Ioannis and Bishop of Xanthi Panteleimon and Academician St. Imellos at his induction ceremony in the Academy of Athens.

- “Timoshenko Mechanics Lecture”, Louisiana State University, 2020
- “Award of the Rotary Club of Mytilene”, for His Invaluable Contributions in Engineering Mechanics and Higher Education, 2019
- Archon, Teacher of the Nation, Patriarchate of Alexandria and Africa, 2018
- “Blaise Pascal Medal in Engineering 2018,” European Academy of Sciences, 2018
- “Takeo Yokobori Medal,” International Congress of Fracture, 2017
- “Theocaris Award,” European Society for Experimental Mechanics (EURASEM), 2012
- SAGE Best Paper Award at the First International Conference on Damage Mechanics, Belgrade, 25–27 July 2012, for the paper: "Failure Modes of Composite Sandwich Beams," International Journal of Damage Mechanics, Vol. 11, pp. 309–334, 2002, by Daniel, I.M., Gdoutos, E.E., Wang, K.-A. and Abot, J.L., 2012
- “Panetti-Ferrari Prize,” Turin Academy of Sciences, 2012 (past recipients of the award include: G.I.Taylor (1958), J.M. Burgers (1960), W. Prager (1963), M.J. Lighthill (1965), C. Truesdell (1967), N.I. Muskhelishvili (1969), W.T. Koiter (1971), R.S. Rivlin (1975), P. Germain (1978), G. Grioli (1982), L. Crocco (1985), R. Hill (1988), G.I. Barenblatt (1995), D.C. Drucker (1999), H.K. Moffatt (2001), J.L. Ericksen (2003), K.R. Sreenivasan (2006), J.R. Rice (2008), U. Frisch (2010)
- “Colonnetti Gold Medal 2012,” Italian Research Institute of Metrology (INRIM), 2012
- “Zandman Award,” Society for Experimental Mechanics (SEM), 2011
- “Golden Sign,” Russian Academy of Engineering, 2011
- "Tatnall Award,” Society for Experimental Mechanics (SEM), 2010
- “Award of Merit,” European Society for Experimental Mechanics (EURASEM), 2010
- “Griffith Medal,” European Structural Integrity Society (ESIS), 2010
- “Theocaris Award,” Society for Experimental Mechanics (SEM), 2009
- “Lazan Award,” Society for Experimental Mechanics (SEM), 2009
- Medal and Diploma of the International Academic Rating of Popularity “Golden Fortune,” 2009
- Paton Medal of the Ukrainian Academy of Sciences, 2009
- Jubilee Medal “XV Year to IAE” of the International Academy of Engineering, 2009
- “Award of Merit,” European Structural Integrity Society (ESIS), 2008
- The Journal Meccanica dedicated a special issue in his honor, Vol. 50(2), pp. 253–590 (2015).

== Bibliography ==
He published and edited over 40 books in the area of mechanics of materials, fracture mechanics and experimental mechanics. His book "Fracture Mechanics" is used as a textbook by many universities for fracture mechanics courses.

- Gdoutos, E.E., "Theory and Applications of Photoelasticity,” pp. 1–127, Athens National Technical University, 1976.
- Theocaris, P.S. and Gdoutos, E.E., "Matrix Theory of Photoelasticity,” Springer Series in Optical Sciences, Vol. 11, pp. i-xi and 1-352, Springer Verlag, 1979.
- Gdoutos, E.E. "Mechanics of Deformable Bodies - Theory of Elasticity and Strength of Materials,” pp. i-xv and 1-542, Kyriakidis Bros Publishers, Thessaloniki, 1979.
- Gdoutos, E.E., "Kinematics,” pp. i-x and 1-106, Kyriakids Bros Publishers, Thessaloniki, 1981.
- Gdoutos, E.E. and Calfas, C., "Statics - Exercises, Vol. I,” pp. i-xiii and 1-558, Kyriakidis Bros Publishers, Thessaloniki, 1981. ISBN 960-343-072-2
- Gdoutos, E.E. and Calfas, C., "Statics - Exercises, Vol. II,” pp. i-viii and 1-769, Kyriakidis Bros Publishers, Thessaloniki, 1983. ISBN 960-266-105-4.
- Gdoutos, E.E. and Zacharopoulos, D., "Problems of the Theory of Elasticity,” pp. i-xii and 1-318, Kyriakidis Bros Publishers, Thessaloniki, 1984.
- Gdoutos, E.E., "Problems of Mixed-Mode Crack Propagation”, pp. i-xiv and 1-204, Martinus Nijhoff Publishers, 1984.
- Gdoutos, E.E., "Theory of Elasticity", Symmetria Publishing, Athens, 2003. ISBN 978-960-266-118-5.
- Gdoutos, E.E., "Strength of Materials”, Symmetria, Athens, 2004. ISBN 960-266-114-3.
- Gdoutos, E.E., "Statics,” pp. 1–359, Kyriakids Bros Publishers, Thessaloniki, 1984.
- Gdoutos, E.E. and Calfas, C., "Principles of Mechanics of Rigid Bodies – Statics,” Vol. I, pp. i-xii and 1-480, Kyriakidis Bros Publishers, Thessaloniki, 1985.
- Gdoutos, E.E. and Calfas, C., "Principles of Mechanics of Rigid Bodies - Statics", Vol. II, pp. i-xii and 1-492, Kyriakidis Bros Publishers, Thessaloniki, 1986.
- Gdoutos, E.E., "Fracture Mechanics Criteria and Applications,” pp. i-xii and 1-314, Kluwer Academic Publishers, 1990.
- Gdoutos, E.E. and Sih, G.C. (eds), "Mechanics and Physics of Energy Density,” pp. I-VIII and 1-209, Kluwer Academic Publishers, 1992.
- Gdoutos, E.E., "Fracture Mechanics - An Introduction," pp. i-xiii and 1-307, Kluwer Academic Publishers, 1993.
- Theocaris P.S. and Gdoutos, E.E. (eds), “Proceedings of the Fourth Greek National Congress on Mechanics,” Vol. I and II, pp. i-xvi and 1-1068, Kyriakidis Bros Publishers, 1995.
- Gdoutos, E.E., "Solutions Manual: Fracture Mechanics - An Introduction,” pp. i-viii and 1-196, Kyriakidis Bros Publishers, 1996.
- Paipetis, S.A. and Gdoutos, E.E. (ed.), “Proceedings of the First Hellenic Conference on Composite Materials and Structures,” Vol. I, pp. i-xiv and 1-810 and Vol. II, pp. i-xvi and 1-238, Kyriakidis Bros Publishers, 1997.
- Gdoutos, E.E. (ed.), “Honorary Volume for Professor D.D. Raftopoulos,” pp. i-xxvi and 1-562, Athanasopoulos and Papadamis Publishers, 1998.
- Kounadis, A.N. and Gdoutos, E.E. (eds), "Recent Advances in Mechanics - Abstracts,” pp. i-viii and 1-102, Athanasopoulos and Papadamis Publishers, 1998.
- Gdoutos, E.E., Pilakoutas, K. and Rodopoulos, C.A. (eds), "Failure Analysis of Industrial Composite Materials,” pp. i-xviii and 1-555, McGraw-Hill, 2000.
- Katsikadellis, J.T. Beskos, D.E. and Gdoutos, E.E. (ed.), "Recent Advances in Applied Mechanics - Honorary Volume for Professor A.N. Kounadis,” pp. i-xix and 1-349, National Technical University of Athens, 2000.
- Gdoutos, E.E. (ed.), "Recent Advances in Experimental Mechanics - In Honor of Isaac M. Daniel,” pp. i-xlvi and 1-798, Kluwer Academic Publishers, 2002.
- Gdoutos, E.E. and Z. P. Marioli-Riga (eds), “Recent Advances in Composite Materials - In Honor of. S. A. Paipetis,” pp. i- xxviii and 1-381, Kluwer Academic Publishers, 2003.
- Gdoutos, E.E., Rodopoulos, C.A. and Yates, J.R. (eds), “Problems of Fracture Mechanics and Fatigue – A Solution Guide,” pp. i-xxvi and 1-618, Kluwer Academic Publishers, 2003.
- Gdoutos, E.E., “Fracture Mechanics – An Introduction,” Second Edition, pp. i-xv and 1-369, Springer, 2005.
- Gdoutos, E.E., (ed.), “Fracture of Nano and Engineering Materials and Structures,” Proceedings of the 16th European Conference of Fracture (ECF16), pp. i-l and 1-1418, Springer, 2006.
- Gdoutos, E.E. and Andrianopoulos, N.P. (eds), “Collected Papers of Professor Pericles S. Theocaris,” Introductory Volume & Volumes 1-12, Pericles S. Theocaris Foundation, 2006.
- Gdoutos, E.E., (ed.) “Experimental Analysis of Nano and Engineering Materials and Structures,” Proceedings of the 13th International Conference on Experimental Mechanics (ICEM13)”, pp. i –xlii, and 1-978, Springer, 2007.
- Daniel, I.M., Gdoutos, E.E. and Rajapakse, Y.D.S. (eds), “Major Accomplishments in Composite Materials and Sandwich Structures – An Anthology of ONR Sponsored Research,” Springer, pp. i-xviii, and 1-818, Springer, 2009.
- Kounadis, A.N. and Gdoutos, E.E. (eds), “Recent Advances in Mechanics - Dedicated to the Late Academician - Professor Pericles S. Theocaris,” Book of Abstracts, Pericles S. Theocaris Foundation, pp. i-xvi, and 1-75, 2009.
- Gdoutos, E.E. (ed.), “Proceedings of the First National Greek Conference and First Greek-Ukrainian Symposium on Fracture Mechanics of Materials and Structures,” pp. i-x and 1-120, 2010.
- Kounadis, A.N. and Gdoutos, E.E. (eds), “Recent Advances in Mechanics - Dedicated to the Late Academician - Professor Pericles S. Theocaris,” pp i-xxx, and 1-462, Springer, 2011.
- Panasyuk, V.V., Gdoutos, E.E. and Bobalo, Yu.Ya. (eds), “Proceedings of the Second Ukrainian-Greek Symposium on Fracture Mechanics of Materials and Structures,” pp. 1–112, 2011.
- Gdoutos, E.E. and Konsta-Gdoutos, M.S., (eds), “Proceedings of the First Greek-Russian Symposium on Advanced Solid and Fracture Mechanics,” pp. i-vii and 1-51, 2011.
- Daniewicz, S.R., Belsick, C.A. and Gdoutos, E.E., (eds), “Fatigue and Fracture Mechanics: 38th Volume,” STP1546, pp. i-viii and 1-380, American Society for Testing and Materials ,2012. ISBN 978-0-8031-7532-7, ISSN 1040-3094
- Gdoutos, E.E., Konsta-Gdoutos, M.S. and Goldstein, R., (eds), “Proceedings of the Second Greek-Russian Symposium on Advanced Solid and Fracture Mechanics,” pp. i-vii and 1-51, 2015. ISBN 978-960-6653-96-4
- Gdoutos, E.E., "Statics Vol. I,” pp. 1-733, Symmetria Publishing, Athens, 2014. ISBN 978-960-11-0009-8.
- Gdoutos, E.E., "Statics Vol. IΙ,” pp. 1-967, Symmetria Publishing, Athens, 2014. ISBN 978-960-266-002-7.
- Gdoutos, E.E., (ed) “Comprehensive Composite Materials – II, Volume 1: Fiber Reinforcements and General Theory of Composites,” pp. i-xvi and 1-611, Elsevier, 2017.
- Gdoutos, E.E., (ed) “Proceedings of the First International Conference on Theoretical, Applied and Experimental Mechanics,” pp. i-xv and 1-418, Springer, 2018.
- Gdoutos, E.E., (ed) “Proceedings of the Second International Conference on Theoretical, Applied and Experimental Mechanics,” pp. i-xiv and 1-379, Springer, 2019.
- Gdoutos, E.E., “Fracture Mechanics – An Introduction,” Third Edition, pp. i-xv and 1-477, Springer, 2020.
- Gdoutos, E.E. and Konsta-Gdoutos, M. (eds) “Proceedings of the Third International Conference on Theoretical, Applied and Experimental Mechanics,” i-xiv and 1-364, Springer, 2020.
- Gdoutos, E.E., “Experimental Mechanics – An Introduction,” pp. i-xxi and 1-311, Springer, 2022.
