= Kaliat Ramesh =

Kaliat T. Ramesh
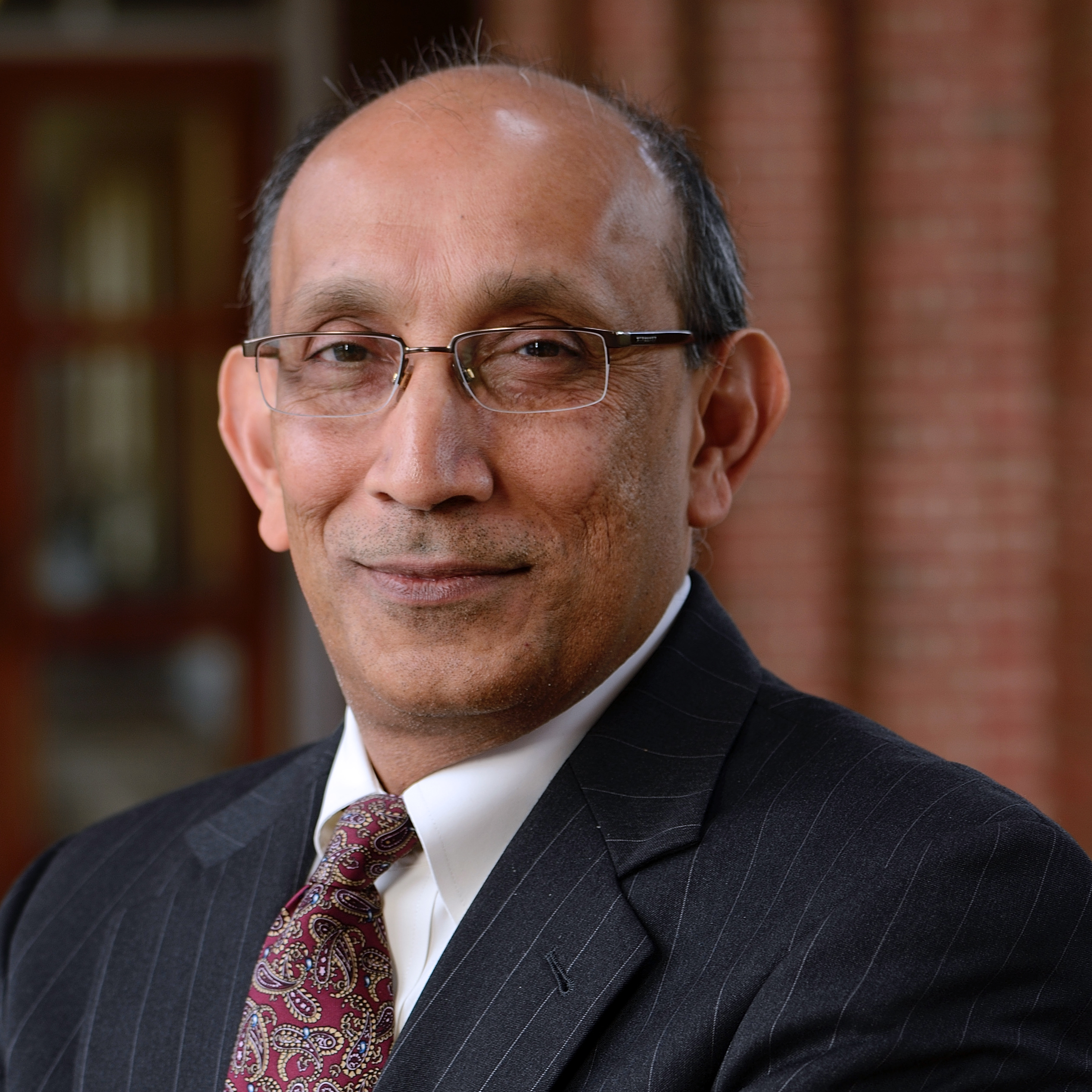
- Born: 1959 (age 66–67); India
- Education: Brown University; Bangalore University
- Known for: Impact (mechanics); Nanomaterials; Planetary impacts
- Title: Alonzo G. Decker Jr. Professor of Science and Engineering at Johns Hopkins University
- Awards: ASME Koiter Medal (2019)
- Scientific career
- Workplaces: Johns Hopkins University; Applied Physics Laboratory
- Website: hemi.jhu.edu/ramesh/

Kaliat T. Ramesh is the Alonzo G. Decker Jr. Professor of Science and Engineering at Johns Hopkins University, the founding Director of the Hopkins Extreme Materials Institute (HEMI), and a Fellow of the American Association for Advancement of Science.

Ramesh is a specialist in the areas of impact physics and the behavior and failure of materials under extreme conditions. His research focuses on fundamental studies of deformation and failure, with applications in mechanical engineering, materials science, planetary science, and biomedicine. He pioneered experimental methods for characterizing the dynamic failure mechanisms in metals and ceramics using high-speed visualization and in situ measurements with high temporal resolution. His most recent research work focuses on the design of materials for extreme conditions, hypervelocity impact, impact processes in planetary science, and impact biomechanics.

== Education ==
Ramesh earned his bachelor's degree in mechanical engineering from Bangalore University in 1983. He received a Sc.M. in engineering and a Sc.M. in applied mathematics from Brown University in 1985 and 1986, respectively. In 1988, he earned a PhD in engineering from Brown University, under the guidance of advisor Rodney Clifton.

== Career and research ==
Following his doctorate, Ramesh was briefly a postdoctoral researcher at the University of California, San Diego under Siavouche Nemat-Nasser. He then joined Johns Hopkins in 1988 as a faculty member in the Department of Mechanical Engineering, rising to become the chair of the department in 1999. In 2012, he was named the founding Director of the Hopkins Extreme Materials Institute (HEMI), a research institute on the fundamental science associated with materials and structures under extreme conditions.

His primary appointment is as Professor of Mechanical Engineering, with joint appointments in the Departments of Earth & Planetary Sciences and Materials Science and Engineering at Johns Hopkins. He is also a member of the Principal Professional Staff at the Johns Hopkins Applied Physics Laboratory.

Ramesh's research has included a blend of experimental and modeling efforts, with emphasis on identifying key deformation and failure mechanisms through experimental methods and then building theoretical and computational models for those mechanisms. This approach has allowed him to investigate extreme conditions where multiple mechanisms are triggered simultaneously.

Ramesh has written over 200 archival journal publications, and is the author of the book Nanomaterials: Mechanics and Mechanisms. His research efforts have been featured by the New York Times, the Discovery Channel, Popular Science, the Travel Channel, and Fox News.

In being awarded the Koiter Medal from ASME, Ramesh was cited "for pioneering scientific contributions and international leadership in the area of dynamic material instabilities and material failure, with applications ranging from the mechanics of traumatic brain injury to nanostructured materials and planetary impact."

== Awards and honors ==
- 2019: Warner T. Koiter Medal, American Society of Mechanical Engineers
- 2018: Fellow of the American Association for Advancement of Science
- 2017: Fellow of the American Academy of Mechanics
- 2015: William M. Murray Medal, Society for Experimental Mechanics
- 2014: M. G. McLaren Lecture Award, Rutgers University
- 2013: Fellow of the Society for Experimental Mechanics
- 2012: B. J. Lazan Award, Society for Experimental Mechanics<
- 2006: M. Hetenyi Award, Society for Experimental Mechanics
- 2001: Fellow of American Society of Mechanical Engineers
- 1995: William H. Huggins Award for Excellence in Teaching, Johns Hopkins University
- 1987: Best Paper Award, ASME Tribology Division
