= Charles E. Taylor (engineer) =

American engineering scientist (1924–2017)

- Born: March 24, 1924
- Died: December 18, 2017 (aged 93)
- Education: University of Illinois Urbana-Champaign (PhD)
- Scientific career
- Fields: Mechanics photoelasticity Moire
- Workplaces: University of Illinois Urbana-Champaign; University of Florida
- Thesis: (1953)

Charles E. Taylor (March 24, 1924 — December 18, 2017) was an American engineer. He was a Professor of Theoretical and Applied Mechanics (TAM) Department at the University of Illinois Urbana-Champaign. He was known as Chuck.

== Education ==
Taylor earned a BS in mechanical engineering in 1946 and MS in engineering mechanics in 1948 from Purdue University. He received his PhD in Theoretical and Applied Mechanics from the University of Illinois Urbana-Champaign in 1953. Taylor received an honorary PhD from his alma mater Purdue University in 2006.

== Research and career ==
Taylor served in the Army in the Philippines during World War II. While pursuing his doctoral studies in the Theoretical and Applied Mechanics (TAM) Department at the University of Illinois Urbana-Champaign he was an instructor (1948 to 1951) and assistant professor (1951 to 1952). During this time, he worked on three-dimensional photoelasticity with support from TAM Professor Thomas J. Dolan and took on his first graduate student, co-advising Daniel Post who obtained an MS in 1951. However, Taylor's own doctoral studies were interrupted by the Korean War, with him serving as a civilian engineer at the David Taylor Model Basin at Carderock, Maryland, from 1952 to 1954. In 1954 Yaylor returned to academic life as a professor of theoretical and applied mechanics from the University of Illinois Urbana-Champaign. He was an internationally recognized authority on optical stress analysis technique, including for his introduction of coherent optics to photoelasticity and dynamic photoelasticity with a ruby laser as an intense polarized monochromatic light source. He contributed to Moire interferometry and dynamic fracture mechanics. Upon his retirement in 1981 he moved to Florida where he taught at the University of Florida until 1993. He was a president of the Society for Experimental Stress Analysis (SESA) (now Society for Experimental Mechanics) from 1966 to 1967. He was named the tenth honorary member of the society in 1983, a position held until his death in 2017. The Society for Experimental Mechanics created the C.E. Taylor Award in his honor to award an SEM member who demonstrates technical excellence in optical stress analysis and good citizenship within SEM, with Taylor being the first recipient in 2000. He was elected to the National Academy of Engineering in 1979. He also served as the president of the Society of Engineering Science in 1978 and of the American Academy of Mechanics from 1993 to 1994.

== Awards and recognition ==
- Society for Experimental Mechanics Frocht Award (1969)
- Society for Experimental Mechanics Hetényi (1969 & 1972)
- Society for Experimental Mechanics Murray Lecture and Award (1974)
- Society for Experimental Mechanics Fellow (1976)
- National Academy of Engineering (1979)
- American Society of Mechanical Engineers Fellow (1979)
- American Association for the Advancement of Science Fellow (1980)
- Society for Engineering Science Fellow (1980)
- Society for Experimental Mechanics Honorary Member (1983 to 2017)
- Society for Experimental Mechanics Tatnall (1983)
- Society for Experimental Mechanics Taylor (2000)
- American Academy of Mechanics Fellow
