= C. W. Smith =

C. W. Smith may refer to:

- C. W. Smith (writer), American writer and professor of English
- C. W. Smith (racing driver), American stock car racing driver
- C.W. Smith (engineer), American engineer and professor
