= Greer Ellis =

American engineering scientist

- Born: June 7, 1910
- Died: October 15, 1997 (aged 87)
- Education: Massachusetts Institute of Technology (MS); George Washington University (BS)
- Scientific career
- Fields: Mechanics brittle coating strain gauge
- Workplaces: Magnaflux Corporation; Ellis Associates

Greer Ellis (June 7, 1920 — October 15, 1997) was an American engineer and inventor of Stresscoat brittle coating for non-destructive stress analysis.

== Education ==
Ellis earned a BS in Physics in 1934 from the George Washington University and began an MS from Massachusetts Institute of Technology with Professor Alfred V. de Forest in 1936.

== Research and career ==
Working with Magnaflux Corporation, a company founded by his MIT MS advisor Alfred V. de Forest, Ellis starting marketing a brittle coating for non-destructive stress analysis under the name Stresscoat in 1941. After some time working with Magnaflux Corporation, he established his own consulting business as Ellis Associates. He was much sought after for consulting on new stress analysis tools, including the Stresscoat brittle coating he invented and bonded electric resistance strain gages invented at MIT during his time at the university. Measurements Group, Inc. bought Ellis Associates and continued to build many products Ellis invented and designed. In 1941 Ellis was an early member of the Society for Experimental Stress Analysis (SESA), now the Society for Experimental Mechanics (SEM). He was the inaugural recipient of the Society for Experimental Mechanics Lazan Award in 1968. He was named an Honorary Member of the Society in 1984, a position held until his death in 1997.

== Awards and recognition ==
- The Franklin Institute Certificate of Merit (1940)
- Society for Experimental Mechanics Lazan Award (1968)
- Society for Experimental Mechanics Fellow (1976)
- Society for Experimental Mechanics Honorary Member (1984 to 1997)
