= Sciammarella =

Sciammarella is an Italian surname. Notable people with the surname include:

- Cesar Sciammarella (born 1924), Argentine civil engineer
- Rodolfo Sciammarella (1902–1973), Argentine composer
