= David Ewins =

British mechanical engineer (1942–2023)

Professor David Ewins FRS FREng FIMechE

Professor of Vibration Engineering, University of Bristol
- In office 2007–2015

Professor of Vibration Engineering, Imperial College of Science, Technology and Medicine/Imperial College London
- In office 1983–2013

Personal details
- Born: David John Ewins; 25 March 1942
- Died: 25 January 2023 (aged 80)

David John Ewins FRS (25 March 1942 – 25 January 2023) was a British mechanical engineer. He was Director of the Bristol Laboratory for Advanced Dynamics Engineering (BLADE) at University of Bristol from 2007 to 2015.

== Life and career ==
Ewins studied mechanical engineering at Imperial College London, and studied for a PhD at the University of Cambridge. He was Professor of Vibration Engineering at Imperial College London.

Ewins was acting director of the AgustaWestland UTC.

Ewins was appointed a Fellow of the Royal Academy of Engineering and Fellow of the Royal Society in 2006.

Ewins was appointed a Fellow of the Society for Experimental Mechanics in 2014.

Ewins died on 25 January 2023, at the age of 80.
