= Douglas Adams (engineer) =

American engineer

Douglas Edward Adams is an American engineer, currently the Distinguished Professor of Civil and Environmental Engineering and Daniel F. Flowers at Vanderbilt University, and also a published author. He was named a Fellow of the Society for Experimental Mechanics in 2021. He is also a member of the American Society of Mechanical Engineers. He was the recipient of a Presidential Early Career Award for Scientists and Engineers in 2001 while a professor at Purdue University.
