= Daniel Inman =

Professor of Aerospace Engineering

- Born: Daniel J. Inman
- Education: Michigan State University; Grand Valley State College
- Awards: Received ASME 2015 Rayleigh Lecture Award
- Scientific career
- Workplaces: University of Michigan; State University of New York; Virginia Tech; University of Bristol
- Doctoral students: > 70 students
- Website: aero.engin.umich.edu/people/daniel-j-inman/

Daniel J. Inman is an American engineer and academic known for his work in smart structures, structural dynamics, vibration control, and structural health monitoring. He is currently the Harm Buning Collegiate Professor of Aerospace Engineering at the University of Michigan. Inman has held previous academic positions at Virginia Tech, the State University of New York at Buffalo, and the University of Bristol.

He has published extensively in the field, is a Fellow of several major engineering societies, and served for more than two decades as editor-in-chief of the Journal of Intelligent Material Systems and Structures.

== Early life and education ==
Inman earned a Bachelor of Science in Physics from Grand Valley State University, followed by a Master of Arts in Teaching and a Ph.D. in Mechanical Engineering from Michigan State University. He began his academic career at the State University of New York at Buffalo, where he served as a department chair. In 1992, he joined Virginia Tech as the Goodson Professor of Mechanical Engineering and Director of the Center for Intelligent Material Systems and Structures.

== Personal life ==
In his earlier years, Inman was a musician. He played drums for the West Michigan rock band 4 U and Him, which performed regularly at southeast Michigan venues including the Westgate Bowl, Seaway Bar in Holland, and the Shamrock Lounge for several years.

== Career ==
Inman is the Harm Buning Collegiate Professor of Aerospace Engineering at the University of Michigan. He formerly helds adjunct appointments at Virginia Tech in Mechanical Engineering and at the University of Bristol as Brunel Chair in Intelligent Materials and Structures. He has additionally held adjunct or visiting positions in the Division of Applied Mathematics at Brown University and inmathematics at the University of Southern California.

He began his career teaching physics at Grand Rapids Educational Park (1970–1976) and later held research and teaching roles at Michigan State University and Bell Laboratories. From 1980 to 1992, he served in various academic and leadership positions at the State University of New York at Buffalo, including professor and chair of Mechanical and Aerospace Engineering.

Inman joined Virginia Tech in 1992, where he directed the Mechanical Systems Laboratory and later the Center for Intelligent Material Systems and Structures. He held the Samuel Herrick and George R. Goodson endowed professorships and held joint or affiliate appointments in mathematics, aerospace, and ocean engineering. He moved to the University of Michigan in 2011.

At Michigan, Inman subsequently served as chair of the Department of Aerospace Engineering, a role in which he was serving in 2016 when he was named principal investigator on a multi-university Air Force Office of Scientific Research grant on avian-inspired morphing aircraft.

== Research ==
Inman's research applies smart materials and structures to aerospace engineering problems, including energy harvesting, structural health monitoring, vibration suppression, and morphing aircraft. He leads the Adaptive Intelligent and Multifunctional Structures (AIMS) Laboratory at the University of Michigan, which studies the intersection of controls, structural dynamics, and materials science in aerospace applications.

=== Avian-inspired morphing aircraft ===
Since the early 2010s, Inman's research group has studied morphing aircraft unmanned aerial vehicles capable of changing wing shape in flight, drawing on observations of avian flight. In 2016, Inman was named principal investigator on a five-year, $6 million grant from the Air Force Office of Scientific Research, awarded jointly to researchers at the University of Michigan, Texas A&M University, Stanford University, and UCLA, to study avian biological systems as a basis for shape-changing unmanned aircraft.

Working with doctoral students and collaborators at the University of British Columbia and the Royal Veterinary College, Inman's group published research in Nature and in the Journal of the Royal Society Interface showing that avian flight agility results from birds' ability to switch rapidly between aerodynamically stable and unstable gliding configurations, and that wings capable of morphing into the range of three-dimensional shapes used by gliding gulls could help small aircraft remain stable in gusts and land in tighter spaces.

A further study from the group, examining how gulls control instability along their long axis using their wrist and elbow joints, was covered by trade press including Lab Manager. This research not only advances the design space for aircraft, but also helps avian biologist understand bird flight. Inman group has extended this work to feather-like 3D-printed structures attached to morphing wings, designed to deflect passively in response to gusts; research on these artificial feathers received best paper awards from the American Society of Mechanical Engineers in 2025.

=== Smart structures, energy harvesting, and structural health monitoring ===
Alongside his morphing-aircraft research, Inman has published extensively on piezoelectric energy harvesting. vibration control, and impedance-based structural health monitoring, in which structural excitations are used to detect changes indicating potential damage. Energy harvesting is the concept of collecting low level ambient energy (heat, vibration, solar) using smart materials to change ambient energy into stored electrical energy with the general application of powering remote sensors. In 2013 his group's efforts to develop ways of harvesting energy from vibration lead to the concept of a battery free pacemaker using the heartbeats natural vibration to replace the battery.

== Editorial and professional service ==
Inman served as Editor-in-Chief of the Journal of Intelligent Material Systems and Structures from 1999 to 2025. He also served as Editor-in-Chief of the ''ASME Journal of Vibration and Acoustics'' (1989–1999), the ''Shock and Vibration Digest'' (1998–2001), and the journal ''Shock and Vibration'' (1999–2010).

== Awards and honors ==
Inman received the ASME 2015 Rayleigh Lecture Award from the ASME unit Noise Control and Acoustics Division (NCAD) in the year 2015. He got the Structural Dynamics and Materials Award in January 2014 from the AIAA. He also received the honorary professorship from the Nanjing University of Aeronautics and Astronautics, Nanjing, Jiangsu, China, awarded October 2009. In September 2009, he received the Structural Health Monitoring Lifetime Achievement Award. He also got the Dean’s Award for Excellence in Research, Virginia Tech, in the same year. He received the Mechanical Engineering Distinguished Alumni Award from the Michigan State University in 2008. He also got the ASME/Boeing Structural Materials Best Paper Award in April 2008. He got the ASME J.P. Den Hartog Medal in 2007. Inman received the ASME Best Paper Award in structural Dynamics and control, awarded in March 2007. In the same year, he got DE Michele Award of the Society for Experimental Mechanics. He received the Benjamin Meaker Visiting Professorship in May 2004 from the University of Bristol, UK, for visiting during AY 2004-05 and lecturing on smart Structures. He got the SPIE 2003 Smart Structures and Materials Lifetime Achievement Award, in March 2003. Inman received the H. C. Pusey Best Paper Award in November 2002. He also received the President’s Award for Research Excellence (Virginia Tech), awarded May 2001. He got the ASME AIAA SDM Best Paper Award in April 2001. He received the ASME/Boeing Structural Materials Best Paper Award in April 2000. In the same year, he got the ASME 2000 Adaptive structures and Material Systems Prize. He also awarded as the ASME Distinguished Lecturer, 1995–2004. He was elected an Honorary Member of ASME in 2026, one of the most prestigious distinctions the ASME Board of Governor can bestow on its members. In December 2021, Inman received the JS Rao Medal in Vibration Engineering.

Inman is a fellow of the Society of Experimental Mechanics (2016), National Institute of Aerospace (2004), American Institute of Aeronautics and Astronautics (2002), International Institute of Acoustics and Vibrations (1999), American Academy of Mechanics (1997), American Society of Mechanical Engineers (1990) and also he received the Young Presidential Award by Ronald Reagan and administered by the National Science Foundation.

== Selected Publications ==
Inman has published extensively, including over 425 journal articles, more than 690 conference papers, and several books, such as Engineering Vibration and Piezoelectric Energy Harvesting, Birds can transition between stable and unstable states via wing morphing, and A Review of Vibration-Based Damage Detection in Civil Structures: From Traditional Methods to Machine Learning and Deep Learning, 1D Convolutional Neural Networks and Applications - A Survey, and A Review of Morphing Aircraft. He has also contributed to the development of educational materials and software manuals in the field of mechanics and vibration. A new edition (5^{th}) of his Engineering Vibration textbook, described by the University of Michigan as a best-selling book in its field, was released in 2021.

== Books ==
Inman has published many books and chapters. Here are some of his notable contributions.

- Inman, D. J., 2017. Vibration with Control, 2nd Edition, John Wiley and Sons, Ltd, New York, NY.
- Inman, D. J., Engineering Vibration, Pearson, Upper Saddle River, NJ, 1994, 1996 (7th printing in 1999); 2nd Edition, 2000 (9th printing in 2006); Korean edition, January 2003; 3rd Edition, 2007, 4th Edition, 2013.
- Erturk, A.. and Inman, D. J., 2011. Piezoelectric Energy Harvesting, John Wiley & Sons, Ltd., Chichester, West Sussex, UK, 416 pp. (ISBN 978-0-470-68254-8)
- Soutas-Little, R. W., Inman, D. J., and Balint, D., 2009. Engineering Mechanics: Dynamics, Computational Edition, Thompson International, Florence, KY.
- Inman, D. J., 2006. Vibration with Control, John Wiley and Sons, Ltd, New York, NY.
- Inman, D. J. and Cudney, H. H., 2000, Structural and Machine Design Using Piezoceramic Materials: a Guide for Structural Design Engineers, Final Report NASA Langley Grant NAG-1-1998
- Soutas-Little, R. W. and Inman, D. J., 1999. Engineering Mechanics: Dynamics, Prentice Hall, Upper Saddle River, NJ.
- Soutas-Little, R. W. and Inman, D. J., 1998. Engineering Mechanics: Statics, Prentice-Hall, Upper Saddle River, NJ.
- Inman, D. J., 1989. Vibrations: Control, Measurement and Stability, Prentice Hall, Upper Saddle River, NJ.
