= Horacio Espinosa =

Argentine-American engineer

Horacio D. Espinosa
- Born: Horacio Dante Espinosa
- Education: National University of the Northeast; Polytechnic University of Milan; Brown University
- Known for: Micro- and nanoscale mechanics, in situ nanomechanical testing, mechanics of biomaterials and metamaterials, cell engineering technologies
- Awards: Member, National Academy of Engineering; Fellow, National Academy of Inventors; ASME Thurston Lecture Award; ASME Drucker Medal; SES Prager Medal
- Scientific career
- Fields: Solid mechanics Materials science Nanotechnology; Biomedical engineering
- Workplaces: Northwestern University; Purdue University
- Thesis: Micromechanics of the Dynamic Response of Ceramics and Ceramic Composites (1992)
- Doctoral advisor: Rodney J. Clifton; Michael Ortiz

Horacio D. Espinosa is an Argentine-American engineer and academic at Northwestern University. He is the Walter P. Murphy Professor of Mechanical Engineering and directs the university's Theoretical and Applied Mechanics (TAM) Program. His research spans nanomechanics, bio-inspired materials, metamaterials, experimental mechanics, and cellular engineering. He was elected to the U.S. National Academy of Engineering (NAE) in 2020 and named a Fellow of the National Academy of Inventors (NAI) in 2024.

== Early life and education ==
Espinosa was born in Resistencia, Chaco, Argentina. He received his civil engineering degree from the Universidad Nacional del Nordeste in 1981. After working as a structural engineer in Argentina, he earned a M.Sc. in Structural Engineering from Politecnico di Milano (1987), followed by a M.Sc. in Applied Mathematics (1990) and a Ph.D. in Solid Mechanics (1992) from Brown University.

== Academic career ==
Espinosa began his academic career as an assistant professor at Purdue University in 1992, where he was promoted to associate professor with tenure in 1998. He joined Northwestern University in 2000. He is also a co-founder and director of Northwestern University's Institute for Cellular Engineering Technologies (iCET), established in 2015.

Espinosa is the founder of Infinitesimal LLC, a Northwestern University spin-off company focused on microfluidic platforms for single-cell manipulation and analysis. The company has received U.S. government Small Business Innovation Research and Small Business Technology Transfer (SBIR/STTR) funding and collaborates with academic and industrial partners.

== Research ==
At Northwestern, Espinosa leads the Micro and Nanomechanics Laboratory. His group is known for developing MEMS-based platforms for the in situ mechanical characterization of materials at the micro- and nanoscale, for studies of the fracture and toughness of two-dimensional materials, and for localized electroporation methods used in single-cell engineering.

== Professional services ==
Espinosa has held a number of leadership and editorial roles in professional societies and academic initiatives. He served as President of the Society of Engineering Science (SES) in 2012. He was Chair of the U.S. National Committee on Theoretical and Applied Mechanics (USNC/TAM) from 2022 to 2024. He has also served as a delegate to the International Union of Theoretical and Applied Mechanics (IUTAM) General Assembly.

== Honors and awards ==
- National Science Foundation CAREER Award (1996)
- Elected Fellow of the American Academy of Mechanics (2001)
- Elected Fellow of the American Society of Mechanical Engineers (2004)
- Elected Fellow of the Society for Experimental Mechanics (2009)
- Sia Nemat-Nasser Medal, Society for Experimental Mechanics (2013)
- Elected Fellow of the American Association for the Advancement of Science (AAAS) (2013)
- ASME Thurston Lecture Award, American Society of Mechanical Engineers (2015)
- Murray Medal, Society for Experimental Mechanics (2016)
- William Prager Medal, Society of Engineering Science (2019)
- Member of the Academia Europaea (2019)
- Elected member of the U.S. National Academy of Engineering (2020)
- Drucker Medal, American Society of Mechanical Engineers (2022)
- Fellow of the National Academy of Inventors (2024)
- Horace Mann Medal, Brown University (2025)
- Corresponding member, Academy of Athens (2026)
- Zdeněk P. Bažant Medal, American Society of Civil Engineers (2026)
