= Journal of Dynamic Behavior of Materials =

- Discipline: Materials science
- Language: English
- Edited by: Jennifer L. Jordan

Publication details
- History: 2015–present
- Publisher: Springer Science+Business Media on behalf of the Society for Experimental Mechanics
- Frequency: Quarterly
- Open access: Hybrid

Standard abbreviations
- ISO 4: J. Dyn. Behav. Mater.

Indexing
- ISSN: 2199-7446 (print); 2199-7454 (web)
- LCCN: 2018207250
- OCLC no.: 1009488499

Links
- Journal homepage; Online archive

The Journal of Dynamic Behavior of Materials is a quarterly peer-reviewed scientific journal published by Springer Science+Business Media on behalf of the Society for Experimental Mechanics. Jennifer L. Jordan (Los Alamos National Laboratory) has been the editor-in-chief since 2020. The journal was established in 2015 with Eric N. Brown as the inaugural editor-in-chief.

== Abstracting and indexing ==
The journal is abstracted and indexed in:

- Astrophysics Data System
- Ei Compendex
- Emerging Sources Citation Index
- ProQuest databases
- Scopus
