= Scott R. White =

American engineer (1963–2018)

- Born: February 14, 1963; Kansas City, Missouri
- Died: May 28, 2018 (aged 55)
- Education: Missouri Institute of Science and Technology; Washington University in St. Louis Pennsylvania State University
- Known for: Self-healing materials
- Awards: Humboldt Prize, American Society for Composites Outstanding Research Award, Scientific American magazine's “SciAm 50” Award
- Scientific career
- Fields: Aerospace Engineering, Materials Science
- Workplaces: University of Illinois at Urbana-Champaign

Scott Ray White (February 14, 1963 – May 28, 2018) was an American engineer.

Born in Kansas City, Missouri on February 14, 1963, and raised in Harrisonville, Missouri, White obtained a bachelor's degree in mechanical engineering from Missouri Institute of Science and Technology. He continued his studies at Washington University in St. Louis and Pennsylvania State University, where he earned a master's in mechanical engineering and doctorate in engineering mechanics, respectively. White began teaching at the University of Illinois Urbana-Champaign in 1990, and was eventually named Donald B. Willett Professor in Aerospace Engineering. In 2013, he was awarded a Humboldt Research Award.

He died of ocular melanoma at the age of 55 on May 28, 2018, and is survived by his wife and colleague Nancy Sottos.

== Research ==
- Scott White Google Scholar Profile
- Autonomous Materials Systems Research Group

== Legacy ==
Two funds were created to honor and remember Scott White. These two funds, The Scott R. White Aerospace Engineering Professorship and The Scott R. White Aerospace Engineering Visionary Scholarship are respectively dedicated to advancing the body of knowledge and research in the field of autonomous materials and supporting undergraduate research. More information on these funds can be obtained via the University of Illinois Department of Aerospace Engineering - Giving.
