= Thomas J. Dolan =

American engineering scientist (1907–1996)

- Born: 1907
- Died: January 10, 1996 (aged 77)
- Education: University of Illinois at Urbana-Champaign(MS); University of Illinois at Urbana-Champaign(BS)
- Scientific career
- Fields: Mechanics; Fracture; Fatigue
- Workplaces: University of Illinois at Urbana-Champaign

Thomas J. Dolan (1907 – 10 January 1996) was an American engineer and educator. He was a professor and department head at the University of Illinois at Urbana-Champaign.

== Education ==
Dolan graduated in 1929 from the University of Illinois in civil engineering with highest honors and named Bronze Tablet. After briefly working in industry, he returned to Urbana to the University of Illinois, earning a M.S. in civil engineering in 1932.

== Research and career ==
Dolan worked for the Chicago Bridge and Iron Co. between his B.S. and M.S. He spent the remainder of his career at the University of Illinois, with the except of a period during World War II when he was a captain in the U.S. Army (1942–45). He studied fatigue and fracture of metals and introduced the Dolan-Corten Cumulative Damage Theory, published in 1956. Dolan was head of the Department of Theoretical and Applied Mechanics at the University of Illinois from 1952 to 1970. He became an emeritus professor in 1972.

Dolan was the president of the Society for Experimental Stress Analysis (SESA) (now Society for Experimental Mechanics) from 1951 to 1952. He was named the ninth honorary member of the society in 1975, a position held until his death in 1996. SESA introduced the rank of Fellow in 1975 and Dolan was among the first class of SESA Fellows along with the seven other living honorary members of the society named through 1975. He served as vice president and member of the executive committee of ASME, on the board of directors of ASTM, and on the U.S. National Committee on Theoretical and Applied Mechanics. He also consulted to several companies, including A.O. Smith, Bendix Aviation, Caterpillar, General Electric, General Motors, John Deere, and Rocketdyne.

== Awards and recognition ==
- ASTM R.L. Templin Award (1952)
- ASTM C.B. Dudley Medal (1954)
- SEM Murray Lecture and Award (1969)
- University of Illinois College of Engineering Alumni Honor Award for distinguished service in Engineering (1974)
- SEM Honorary Member (1975–1996)
- SEM Fellow (1975)
- ASME Nadai Award (1984)
