= Dominick J. DeMichele =

American engineering scientist

- Born: June 27, 1916
- Died: October 6, 2000 (aged 84)
- Education: Rensselaer Polytechnic Institute (BS)
- Scientific career
- Fields: Mechanics; Modal Analysis
- Workplaces: General Electric

Dominick J. DeMichele (27 June 1916 — 6 October 2000) was an American engineer and founder of the International Modal Analysis Conference (IMAC). He went by Dick.

== Education ==
DeMichele graduated from Rensselaer Polytechnic Institute in 1940.

== Research and career ==
DeMichele started with General Electric in Schenectady NY as a lab assistant in the electromechanical technology laboratory on January 1, 1941. The lab became the research and development laboratory for GE and he got the nickname of "shake man". While at GE he made significant contributions to solid mechanics including vibration, shock, stress analysis, and acoustics. After he retired from GE in 1979 he developed courses for Union College. These developed into the International Modal Analysis Conference (IMAC), the first being held November 8 to 10, 1982 at the Holiday Inn, International Drive, Orlando, Florida. He served as the director for 13 IMACs. He was also a long time member of the Society for Experimental Mechanics, and in 1988 IMAC became affiliation with the Society of Experimental Mechanics. In 1990 the Society for Experimental Mechanics created the D.J. DeMichele Award in his honor to recognize an individual for “exemplary service and support of promoting the science and educational aspects of modal analysis technology.” DeMichele was the inaugural recipient. In 2003 the Society for Experimental Mechanics created the D.J. DeMichele Scholarship to support students' participation in the International Modal Analysis Conference (IMAC). He was named an Honorary Member of the society in 2000, shortly before his passing.

== Awards and recognition ==
- General Electric Company Charles A. Coffin award (1949)
- General Electric Company Inventors Award
- Society for Experimental Mechanics Fellow (1979)
- Society for Experimental Mechanics DeMichele Award (1990)
- Society for Experimental Mechanics Honorary Member (2000 to 2000)
