= Experimental Techniques =

- Discipline: Materials science, engineering
- Language: English

Publication details
- History: 1975–present
- Publisher: Springer Nature
- Frequency: Bimonthly
- Impact factor: 1.167 (2020)

Standard abbreviations
- ISO 4: Exp. Tech.

Indexing
- ISSN: 0732-8818 (print); 1747-1567 (web)

Links
- Journal homepage

Experimental Techniques is an official journal of the Society for Experimental Mechanics and was established in 1975. The journal is published by Springer Nature and the editor-in-chief is Bonnie Antoun (Sandia National Laboratories).

== Abstracting and indexing ==
The journal is abstracted and indexed in:

- Scopus
- Science Citation Index
- Compendex
- Google Scholar
- ProQuest
- Naver
- CNKI
- SCImago Journal Rank
- OCLC
- Semantic Scholar
- Ei Compendex

According to the Journal Citation Reports, the journal has a 2020 impact factor of 1.167.
