= August J. Durelli =

American engineering scientist (1910–2000)

- Born: April 30, 1910; Buenos Aires, Argentina
- Died: March 18, 2000 (aged 89); Chevy Chase, Maryland
- Education: University of Paris(PhD); Catholic University of Paris(PhD); University of Buenos Aires
- Scientific career
- Fields: Mechanics photoelasticity Moire
- Workplaces: Illinois Institute of Technology; Catholic University of America

August J. Durelli (30 April 1910 – 18 March 2000) was an Argentine-American engineer. He was a professor at the Illinois Institute of Technology and the Catholic University of America.

== Education ==
Durelli received a degree in Civil Engineering in 1932 from the University of Buenos Aires. In 1936 he received two doctoral degree, one from the Sorbonne School of the University of Paris in engineering and one in social sciences from the Catholic University of Paris.

== Research and career ==
Upon graduation in 1936 he returned to Buenos Aires but was soon moved to the Massachusetts Institute of Technology in the group of William M. Murray as a Guggenheim Fellowship and then to the Ecole Polytechnique in Montreal as a Visiting Professor. In 1944 he returned to Buenos Aires, during a period of great unrest, where he became the Head of the Laboratory of Testing Materials of the Municipality of Buenos Aires but was fired from his job and jailed due to his deep democratic ideals. In 1946 he left Buenos Aires for good, joining the Illinois Institute of Technology where he became the Head of the Stress Analysis Section and in 1956 he became a Professor of the Civil Engineering Department. In 1961 he moved to the Catholic University of America in Washington, D.C., where he stayed until his retirement in 1975. In retirement he became visiting professor at the University of Oakland in Michigan as the John F. Dodge Professor of Engineering and the University of Maryland. A.J. Durelli was an outstanding experimental stress analysts known for his work in brittle lacquer techniques, photoelasticity, and moiré methods. As his time at MIT was in the group of Bill Murray who would go on to be the first President of the Society for Experimental Stress Analysis (SESA) (later the Society for Experimental Mechanics (SEM)) it is not surprising that Durelli went on to be one of the forming members of that society. Durelli gave the SESA Murray Lecture in 1965 and was named the eighth Honorary Member of the Society in 1972, a position held until his death in 2000. When SESA introduced the rank of Fellow, Durelli was among the first class of SESA Fellows in 1975 along with the seven other living Honorary Members of the society. The Society for Experimental Mechanics initiated the A.J. Durelli Award in his honor in 2004 to recognize a young professional who has introduced an innovative approach or method in experimental mechanics. While initially a biennial award, since 2009 the A.J. Durelli Award has been given annually.

== Family life ==
August was born in Buenos Aires, Argentina. August married Marie Marte (nee Barie) in 1943. They had three children Anna Maria, Monique and Andrew. August was a regular communicant in the Roman Catholic Church and belonged to The Shrine of the Most Blessed Sacrament in Washington, DC.

== Awards and recognition ==
- SEM Murray Lecture and Award (1965)
- SEM Honorary Member (1972 to 2000)
- SEM Fellow (1975)
- SEM Lazan Award (1986)
