= Miklós Hetényi =

Hungarian-American engineering scientist (1906–1984)

- Born: November 5, 1906; Debrecen, Hungary
- Died: October 31, 1984 (aged 77); Stanford, California
- Education: University of Michigan (PhD)
- Scientific career
- Fields: Mechanics photoelasticity
- Workplaces: Stanford University
- Thesis: Analysis of Bars on Elastic Foundation (1936)
- Doctoral advisor: Stephen Tymoshenko

Miklós Imre Hetényi (5 November 1906 – 31 October 1984) was a Hungarian-American engineer. He was a professor at Stanford University and held numerous service roles in the Society for Experimental Stress Analysis (SESA) (now the Society for Experimental Mechanics) including as the second President of the society from 1944 to 1945. His parents were Géza Hetényi and Etelka Jakab (1864–1956). He died at his desk at home on the Stanford campus while working on a structural mechanics book.

== Education ==
Hetényi obtained a degree in civil engineering from the Budapest University of Technology and Economics in 1931. He pursued graduate work with Harold M. Westerguard (from what is now the Grainger College of Engineering) at the University of Illinois Urbana-Champaign from 1934 to 1935, and obtained a Ph.D. in mechanical engineering from the University of Michigan in 1936, supervised by Stephen Timoshenko. It is said he was one of Timoshenko's favorite students and that he worked closely with Ray Mindlin and Dan Drucker on experimental work.

== Research and career ==
The year following his PhD at the University of Michigan he began working in the research laboratories of Westinghouse Electric Corporation, where he remained until 1946, when he became a professor at the Institute of Technology at Northwestern University. In 1962 he went to Stanford University, where he formed a new Experimental Stress Analysis Laboratory and continued to teach until his retirement in 1972. He was chair of the Stanford Applied Mechanics Department from 1965 to 1969. He made seminal contributions to the field of mechanics including three-dimensional photoelasticity, the Reduction Method for the analysis of continuous frames and the Method of Initial Parameters. He was the second President of the Society for Experimental Stress Analysis (SESA) (now Society for Experimental Mechanics) from 1944 to 1945. He is considered one of the four founding members of the society along with Charles Lipson, Raymond D. Mindlin and William M. Murray. SESA initiated the Hetényi Award in his honor in 1967 for the best research paper published in Experimental Mechanics. Hetényi gave the Murray Lecture in 1954 and was named the second Honorary Member of the Society in 1956, a position held until his death in 1984. When SESA introduced the rank of Fellow, Hetényi was among the first class of SESA Fellows in 1975 along with the seven other living Honorary Members of the society. Was also active in American Society of Mechanical Engineering where he chaired the Applied Mechanics Division in 1957 and was named an Honorary Member in 1973. He received honorary degrees from the University of Technical Sciences at Budapest and the University of Glasgow.

== Awards and recognition ==
- SEM Murray Lecture and Award (1954)
- SEM Honorary Member (1956 to 1984)
- SEM/SESA Founder Award (1969)
- SEM Fellow (1975)
- ASME Honorary Member (1973)

== Translation ==
This article is based in part or in whole on a translation of this version of the Portuguese Wikipedia and this version of the Hungarian Wikipedia article Miklós Hetényi. The editors of the original article are listed in its page history. This indication merely indicates the origin of the wording and does not serve as a source for the information in this article.
