= Experimental Mechanics =

- Discipline: Materials science, engineering
- Language: English

Publication details
- History: 1961-present
- Publisher: Springer Science+Business Media
- Frequency: 9/year
- Impact factor: 2.808 (2020)

Standard abbreviations
- ISO 4: Exp. Mech.

Indexing
- CODEN: EXMCAZ
- ISSN: 0014-4851 (print); 1741-2765 (web)
- LCCN: 63040318
- OCLC no.: 605177653

Links
- Journal homepage; Online archive

Experimental Mechanics is a peer-reviewed scientific journal covering all areas of experimental mechanics. It is an official journal of the Society for Experimental Mechanics and was established in 1961, being published monthly. From 1983 to 2003, it was published quarterly, increasing to 6 issues per year until 2009. Since then it has 9 issues per year. The journal is published by Springer Science+Business Media and the editor-in-chief is Professor Alan Zehnder (Cornell University). The journal occasionally publishes special issues on focused topics.

== Abstracting and indexing ==
The journal is abstracted and indexed in:

- Chemical Abstracts Service
- Current Contents/Engineering
- Current Contents/Life Sciences
- PubMed/Medline
- Science Citation Index
- Compendex
- Materials Science Citation Index
- PASCAL

According to the Journal Citation Reports, the journal has a 2020 impact factor of 2.808.
