= Max M. Frocht =

American engineering scientist (1894–1974)

- Born: June 3, 1894; Poland
- Died: July 1974 (aged 80)
- Education: University of Michigan (BS, PhD); University of Pittsburgh (MS)
- Scientific career
- Fields: Mechanics photoelasticity
- Workplaces: Illinois Institute of Technology
- Thesis: (1931)
- Doctoral advisor: Stephen Timoshenko

Max Mark Frocht (3 June 1894 – July 1974) was a Polish-American engineer and educator. He was a professor at the Illinois Institute of Technology and founder of the Laboratory for Experimental Stress Analysis.

== Education ==
Max Mark Frocht had moved from Congress Poland to the United States in 1912, settling in Detroit where he worked as a machinist and tool maker. In 1916 he enrolled in Mechanical Engineering at the University of Michigan, earning his B.S. in 1920. He received an M.S. in physics in 1925 from the University of Pittsburgh, before retiring to the University of Michigan to earn a Ph.D. in 1931 with Stephen Timoshenko.

== Research and career ==
Frocht was an authority on photoelasticity and his two volume work, Photoelasticity, is a classic text in the field. He worked at the Carnegie Institute of Technology between his B.S. and M.S. as an instructor and returned to the Carnegie Institute of Technology as a professor in 1931 after completing his Ph.D. Frocht served on the mechanical engineering faculty of the Illinois Institute of Technology from 1946 to 1960 and then directed the university's Laboratory for Experimental Stress Analysis. Frocht was an important early member of the Society for Experimental Stress Analysis (now the Society for Experimental Mechanics) and had a longstanding frequent rivalry with fellow IIT faculty members and SESA member August J. Durelli, which was seen to contribute to the progress of the photoelastic method. It was therefore ironic that upon Frocht's retirement from IIT, the subsequent two directors of the IIT Laboratory for Experimental Stress Analysis, James W. Dally and Cesar Sciammarella, were both students of Durelli. Frocht was named the third Honorary Member of the Society for Experimental Stress Analysis (SESA) (later the Society for Experimental Mechanics (SEM)) in 1959, a position held until death in 1974. He is the only Honorary Member of the society to not also be Fellow. When SESA introduced the rank of Fellow in 1975 all living Honorary Members of the society were named in the first class of Fellow, but Frocht had died the year before. Since 1975, in the extremely rare case that a new Honorary Member is named who is not already a Fellow that automatically also receive that title. The Society for Experimental Mechanics initiated the M.M Frocht Award in his honor in 1967 to recognize outstanding achievement as an educator in the field of experimental mechanics, with Frocht being the inaugural recipient in 1968.

== Awards and recognition ==
- SEM Honorary Member (1959-1974)
- SEM Murray Lecture and Award (1959)
- SEM Frocht Award (1968)
