= Francis Gibbons Tatnall =

American engineering scientist

Francis G. Tatnall
- Born: March 8, 1896; Philadelphia, Pennsylvania
- Died: December 1981; Plymouth Meeting, Pennsylvania
- Education: University of Pennsylvania
- Scientific career
- Fields: Mechanics strain gauge
- Workplaces: Vishay Intertechnology

Francis Gibbons Tatnall (8 March 1896 – December 1981) was an American engineer and entrepreneur. He went by Frank and was born to William Francis Tatnall and Lillian Harriett Tatnall (born Runcie). Tatnall worked at Vishay Intertechnology and has been referred to as the spiritual father of strain gages.

== Education ==
Tatnall graduated from the University of Pennsylvania with a Mechanical Engineering degree.

== Research and career ==
Tatnall worked for the Baldwin-Southwark Corporation, a subsidiary of the Baldwin Locomotive Works, selling test equipment. During that stage of his career he traveled extensively getting to know everyone in the testing business and got to know many inventors developing new strain gauge technologies. He helped many of these inventors set up businesses, which he took financial stakes in, and arranged to sell the devices through Baldwin-Southwark. In 1951 Baldwin Locomotive Works merged with the Lima-Hamilton Corporation to form the Baldwin-Lima-Hamilton Corporation, where Tatnall was Manager of Testing Research. In the mid 1950s the Budd Company of Philadelphia, opened up a new division called “Tatnall Measuring Systems” (TMS) focusing on advanced equipment and materials testing. Tatnall was the Vice President, General Manager and Director. He hired Felix Zandman as director of basic research and academics in the field of strain measurement including William M. Murray and Dan Post. Tatnall wrote the autobiographical book “Tatnall on Testing, An autobiographical account of adventures under 13 Vice Presidents" outlining his view of the early history of strain gauge development and his role in it, noting "a test is worth a thousand opinions". Following Tatnall's retirement from TMS, Zandman found reduced support for his R&D work from parent company Budd, so in 1962 Zandman started Vishay. Shortly after the formation of Vishay, Tatnall joined Zandman and the two worked together until Tatnall's death in 1981. Tatnall was named the first Honorary Member of the Society for Experimental Stress Analysis (SESA) (later the Society for Experimental Mechanics (SEM)) in 1951, a position held until his death in 1981. When SESA introduced the rank of Fellow, Tatnall was among the first class of SESA Fellows in 1975 along with the seven other living Honorary Members of the society. The Society for Experimental Mechanics initiated the F.G. Tatnall Award in his honor in 1967 to recognize individuals who have made outstanding service contributions to the Society, with Tatnall being the inaugural recipient in 1968. The University of Pennsylvania, Department of Mechanical Engineering and Applied Mechanics awards the Francis G. Tatnall Prize to seniors whose senior design project is judged to be the most outstanding and which reflects the qualities of ingenuity, technical proficiency, and usefulness.

== Awards and recognition ==
- SEM Honorary Member (1953 to 1981)
- SEM Tatnall Award (1968)
- George Washington Medal of the Engineers' Club of Philadelphia (1970)
- SEM Fellow (1975)
