= William M. Murray (engineer) =

American engineering scientist (1910–1990)

- Born: April 24, 1910
- Died: August 9, 1990 (aged 80)
- Education: Massachusetts Institute of Technology (ScD) Massachusetts Institute of Technology (M.S.) McGill University (B.S.)
- Scientific career
- Fields: Mechanics photoelasticity strain gauge
- Workplaces: Massachusetts Institute of Technology
- Thesis: (1936)

William MacGregor Murray (April 24, 1910 — August 9, 1990) was an American engineer. He was a professor at the Massachusetts Institute of Technology and held numerous service roles in the Society for Experimental Stress Analysis (SESA) (now Society for Experimental Mechanics) including as the first President of the society from 1943 to 1944. He went by Bill Murray and died on August 9, 1990.

== Education ==
Murray earned his Bachelor from McGill University in 1932 and a Masters and PHD Degrees in Mechanical Engineering from the Massachusetts Institute of Technology in 1933 and 1936.

== Research and career ==
William Murray was a professor at the Massachusetts Institute of Technology until his retirement in 1975. He studied the field of experimental mechanics making numerous advances to the techniques of Photoelasticity, strain gauges, and brittle coatings. He was the first President of the Society for Experimental Stress Analysis (SESA) (now Society for Experimental Mechanics) from 1943 to 1944, first and long-time secretary-treasurer from 1947 to 1960, and first treasurer from 1960 to 1961. He is considered one of the four founding members of the society along with Miklós Hetényi, Charles Lipson and Raymond D. Mindlin. SESA initiated the William M. Murray Lecture in his honor in 1952 as the Society's prestigious annual lecture, with Murray giving the inaugural lecture. He was named the fifth Honorary Member of the Society in 1968, a position held until his death in 1990. When SESA introduced the rank of Fellow, Murray was among the first class of SESA Fellows in 1975 along with the seven other living Honorary Members of the society.

== Awards and recognition ==
- SEM Murray Lecture and Award (1952)
- SEM Frocht Award (1970)
- SEM/SESA Founder Award (1969)
- SEM Honorary Member (1968 to 1990)
- SEM Fellow (1975)
