= Society for Experimental Mechanics =

- Founded: 1943
- Type: Professional Organization
- Purpose: Experimental Mechanics
- Location: Bethel, CT
- Region served: Worldwide
- Method: Conferences, Publications
- Members: 1,600
- President: Eric N. Brown
- Key people: Kristin Zimmerman (Executive Director)
- Website: www.sem.org

Society for Experimental Mechanics (SEM) is a professional organization for engineers and scientists studying the design and implementation of experiments to characterize materials, structures, and systems. Formed in 1943 as the Society for Experimental Stress Analysis (SESA), early work focused on methods such as photoelasticity and strain gages. Society historical records refer to the society as SESA through the 1984 Fall SESA meeting in Milwaukee, WI and start referring the society as SEM with the 1985 Spring SEM meeting in Las Vegas, NV. The society has expanded to include topics including modal analysis, digital image correlation, Split Hopkinson pressure bar, Residual stress, and biomaterials.

== Technical Divisions ==
The society comprises seventeen technical divisions that program sessions at either the SEM Annual Conference or IMAC Conference, and develop content for publications:

- Applied Photoelasticity
- Biological Systems and Materials
- Dynamics of Civil Structures
- Composite, Hybrid & Multifunctional Materials
- Dynamic Behavior of Materials
- Fracture and Fatigue
- Inverse Problem Methodologies
- MEMS and Nanotechnology
- Modal Analysis
- Model Validation & Uncertainty Quantification
- Optical Methods
- Residual Stress
- Technical Committee on Strain Gages
- Thermomechanics and Infrared Imaging
- Time Dependent Materials
- Sensors and Instrumentation
- The Western Regional Strain Gage Committee

== Publications ==
SEM publishes proceedings volume from the SEM Annual Conference and IMAC Conference with its publishing partner Springer Science+Business Media. SEM-published journals include:

- Experimental Mechanics, which prints 9 issues annual of peer-reviewed manuscripts on advances in experimental mechanics.
- Journal of Dynamic Behavior of Materials, which prints peer-reviewed manuscripts on materials in high strain-rate and extreme conditions.
- Experimental Techniques, which is a bimonthly publication on the development and application of experimental mechanics techniques.

== See also ==
- List of Fellows of the Society for Experimental Mechanics
