= Daniel C. Drucker =

American engineer and academic (1918–2001)

Daniel Drucker
- Born: Daniel Charles Drucker; June 3, 1918; New York City, New York
- Died: September 1, 2001 (aged 83)
- Education: Columbia University, B.S. 1938, Ph.D. 1940
- Awards: Theodore von Karman Medal (1966); William Prager Medal (1983); Timoshenko Medal (1983); John Fritz Medal (1985); ASME Thurston Lecture Award (1986); National Medal of Science (1988); ASME Medal (1992); Drucker Medal (1998)
- Scientific career
- Fields: Mechanical Engineering
- Workplaces: Cornell University; Brown University; University of Illinois at Urbana-Champaign; University of Florida

Daniel Charles Drucker (June 3, 1918 – September 1, 2001) was an American civil and mechanical engineer and academic, who served as president of the Society for Experimental Stress Analysis (now Society for Experimental Mechanics) in 1960–1961, as president of the American Society of Mechanical Engineers in the year 1973–74, and as president of the American Academy of Mechanics in 1981–82.

Drucker was known as an authority on the theory of plasticity in the field of applied mechanics. His key contributions to the field of plasticity include the concept of material stability described by the Drucker stability postulates and the Drucker–Prager yield criterion.

== Biography ==
=== Youth and education ===
Drucker was born in New York City. His father Moses Abraham Drucker was a civil engineer, and Drucker wanted to follow in his footsteps.

Drucker studied at the Columbia University, where he obtained his BSc in civil engineering in 1938. Next, in 1940 he obtained his PhD in mechanical engineering under Raymond D. Mindlin.

=== Career, honours and awards ===
Between 1940 and 1943, Drucker taught at Cornell University, later joining the Armour Research Foundation. After his U.S. Army Air Corps service, he briefly returned to the Illinois Institute of Technology, then he taught at Brown University from 1946 until 1968 when he joined the University of Illinois as Dean of Engineering. In 1984 he left Illinois to become a graduate research professor at the University of Florida until his retirement in 1994.

He received the Murray Lecture and Award in 1967, title the seventh Honorary Member in 1969, Frocht Award in 1971 and title of Fellow from the Society for Strain Analysis (SESA), now known as the Society for Experimental Mechanics (SEM). In 1988, Drucker was awarded the National Medal of Science. He was a member of the National Academy of Engineering and of the American Academy of Arts and Sciences. The Drucker Medal is named in his honor. He was also awarded the ASME Timoshenko Medal in 1983 and the ASME Robert Henry Thurston Lecture Award in 1986.

== Daniel C. Drucker Medal ==
The Daniel C. Drucker Medal, awarded by the American Society of Mechanical Engineers, was named in his honor in 1998. Drucker was the first recipient of this annual award.

- 1998 Daniel C. Drucker
- 1999 Ascher H. Shapiro
- 2000 Philip G. Hodge
- 2001 Bruno A. Boley
- 2002 George J. Dvorak
- 2003 Leon M. Keer
- 2004 Frank A. McClintock
- 2005 Robert L. Taylor
- 2006 Alan Needleman
- 2007 Albert S. Kobayashi
- 2008 Thomas C. T. Ting
- 2009 James R. Barber
- 2010 Rohan Abeyaratne
- 2011 John W. Rudnicki
- 2012 James W. Dally
- 2013 Yonggang Huang
- 2014 Lallit Anand
- 2015 Krishnaswamy Ravi-Chandar
- 2016 Kyung-Suk Kim
- 2017 David Parks
- 2018 David M. Barnett
- 2019 John Bassani
- 2020 Glaucio H. Paulino
- 2021 Markus J. Buehler

== Death ==
Drucker died from leukemia on September 1, 2001.

== Selected publications ==
- An evaluation of current knowledge of the mechanics of brittle fracture
- Constitutive relations for finite deformation of polycrystalline metals : proceedings of the IUTAM Symposium, held in Beijing, China, July 22–25, 1991
- Fracture of solids : proceedings of an international conference sponsored by the Institute of Metals Division, American Institute of Mining, Metallurgical, and Petroleum Engineers, Maple Valley, Washington, August 21–24, 1962
- Introduction to mechanics of deformable solids
- Macroscopic fundamentals in brittle fracture, 1967:
- Mechanics of material behavior, 1983:
- On fitting mathematical theories of plasticity to experimental results
- Plastic design methods - advantages and limitations
- Stress analysis by three-dimensional photoclastic methods
- Stress-strain relations in the plastic range : a survey of theory and experiment
