= Mechanician =

Engineer, scientist, or precision instrumentation specialist in mechanics

A mechanician is an engineer or a scientist working in the field of mechanics, or in a related or sub-field: engineering or computational mechanics, applied mechanics, geomechanics, biomechanics, and mechanics of materials. Names other than mechanician have been used occasionally, such as mechaniker and mechanicist.

In applied mechanical technology and research instrumentation, a mechanician (also titled laboratory mechanician or research mechanician) is a precision fabrication specialist who designs, machines, assembles, and calibrates custom machinery, scientific instruments, and experimental apparatus. The term is also used for specific technical ratings and trades in naval service, telecommunications, and clockwork automata.

== Applied mechanical technology and instrumentation ==
Mechanician
Occupation
- Names: Laboratory Mechanician, Research Mechanician, Chief Mechanician
- Occupation type: Applied mechanical technology / Precision trade
- Activity sectors: Research and development, scientific instrumentation, precision manufacturing

Description
- Competencies: Mechanism design, CNC and manual machining, dimensional metrology, mechatronic integration

Bridging the disciplines of mechanical engineering and master toolmaking, an applied mechanician translates rough conceptual ideas, sketches, or functional requirements into tangible, working hardware.

=== Scope of practice ===
Unlike production machinists, who execute repetitive manufacturing runs from finalized engineering prints, or maintenance mechanics, who service existing equipment, mechanicians operate primarily in research and development and experimental environments. Core functions typically include:

- Mechanism design and prototyping: Conceptualizing kinematic linkages, gear trains, escapements, optical mounts, and custom actuators from first principles, often advising engineers and researchers on geometric tolerances and design for manufacturability.
- Precision machining: Programming and operating manual and computer numerical control (CNC) machine tools—including mills, lathes, and surface grinders—to fabricate one-of-a-kind or low-volume components held to sub-thousandth-of-an-inch tolerances.
- Metrology and fit-up: Performing dimensional inspection using surface plates, gauge blocks, and dial test indicators, alongside hand-fitting operations such as lapping, scraping, and reaming to achieve precise mechanical clearances.
- Mechatronic integration: Combining structural mechanical assemblies with sensors, actuators, and electronic control systems to construct functional proof-of-concept apparatus and test fixtures.

=== Historical context and modern classification ===
Recorded in English usage since at least the 16th century (notably in John Dee's 1570 mathematical preface to Euclid's Elements), the term originally denoted an artisan skilled in both the mathematical theory of mechanics and the physical construction of mechanical contrivances. Throughout the 18th, 19th, and early 20th centuries, master mechanicians worked directly alongside physicists, astronomers, and inventors to construct dividing engines, graduated circles, astronomical refractors, mechanical calculators, and primary metrology standards.

In modern industry and public administration, the exact title remains codified in specific research university systems and civil service frameworks—such as the University of California system (Laboratory Mechanician Series, Codes 8651–8653), the State of Wisconsin (Mechanician, Codes 83481–83482), Purdue University, and the University of Alabama. In federal labor taxonomy and national defense laboratories, equivalent roles are standardized under titles including Instrument maker (U.S. Office of Personnel Management FWS Series 3314 and GS-0802; U.S. Department of Labor DOT 600.280-010) and Experimental Machinist.

== Other technical usages ==
- Naval service: The term mechanician is used by the Irish Navy to refer to junior engine room ratings. In the British Royal Navy, Chief Mechanicians and Mechanicians 1st Class were Chief Petty Officers, Mechanicians 2nd and 3rd Class were Petty Officers, Mechanicians 4th Class were Leading Ratings, and Mechanicians 5th Class were Able Ratings. The rate was only applied to certain technical specialists and no longer exists.
- Telecommunications: In the New Zealand Post Office, which provided telephone service prior to the formation of Telecom New Zealand in 1987, "Mechanician" was a job classification for workers who serviced telephone exchange switching equipment. The term seems to have originated in the era of the 7A Rotary system exchange, and was superseded by "Technician" circa 1975, perhaps because "Mechanician" was no longer considered appropriate after the first 2000 type Step-by-Step Strowger switch exchanges began to be introduced in 1952 (in Auckland, at Birkenhead exchange).
- Automata: It is also the term by which makers of mechanical automata use in reference to their profession.

== People who made lasting contributions to mechanics prior to the 20th century ==
- Ibn al-Haytham: motion
- Galileo Galilei: notion of strength
- Robert Hooke: Hooke's law
- Isaac Newton: Newton's laws, law of gravitation
- Guillaume Amontons: laws of friction
- Leonhard Euler: buckling, rigid body dynamics
- Jean le Rond d'Alembert: d'Alembert's principle, Wave equation
- Joseph Louis Lagrange: Lagrangian mechanics
- Pierre-Simon Laplace: effects of surface tension
- Sophie Germain: elasticity
- Siméon Denis Poisson: elasticity
- Claude-Louis Navier: elasticity, fluid mechanics
- Augustin Louis Cauchy: elasticity
- Barré de Saint-Venant: elasticity
- William Rowan Hamilton: Hamiltonian mechanics
- George Gabriel Stokes: fluid mechanics
- Gustav Kirchhoff: theory of plates
- Josiah Willard Gibbs: thermodynamics
- Heinrich Rudolf Hertz: contact mechanics

== People who made lasting contributions to mechanics and died during or after the 20th century ==
- Ludwig Burmester: theory of linkages
- Carlo Alberto Castigliano: Elasticity (physics)
- Ludwig Prandtl: Fluid mechanics, Plasticity
- Stephen Timoshenko: author of many lasting textbooks, father of modern applied mechanics
- Theodore von Karman: Fluid mechanics, Structural instability
- Richard Edler von Mises: Plasticity
- Geoffrey Ingram Taylor: Fluid mechanics, theory of dislocations.
- Alan Arnold Griffith: founder of Fracture mechanics
- George Rankine Irwin: father of modern Fracture mechanics
- Warner T. Koiter: Solid mechanics, Structural instability
- John D. Eshelby: inclusion in elastic body

== Honors and awards ==
by European Mechanics Society ,

- Euromech Fellow
- Solid and Fluid Mechanics Prizes

by Applied Mechanics Division, American Society of Mechanical Engineers

- Timoshenko Medal
- Koiter Medal
- Drucker Medal
- Thomas K. Caughey Dynamics Award
- Ted Belytschko Applied Mechanics Award
- Thomas J.R. Hughes Young Investigator Award

by American Society of Civil Engineers

- Theodore von Karman Medal, ASCE

by Society of Engineering Science, Inc.

- Eringen Medal
- William Prager Medal in Solid Mechanics
- G. I. Taylor Medal in Fluid Mechanics

== See also ==
- Applied mechanics
- Mechanics
- Geomechanics
- Biomechanics
- Structural analysis
- Fluid mechanics
- Tool and die maker
- Mechanical engineering technology
- Precision engineering
- Model maker
