= Drucker Medal =

The Daniel C. Drucker medal was instituted in 1997 by the Applied Mechanics Division of the American Society of Mechanical Engineers. The Drucker Medal is conferred in recognition of distinguished contributions to the fields of applied mechanics and mechanical engineering. The award is given in honor of Daniel C. Drucker, who was internationally known for contributions to the theory of plasticity and its application to analysis and design in metal structures. The recipient is given a medal and an honorarium.

== Nomination procedure ==
The Drucker Medal Committee consists of the five recent Drucker Medalists, the five members of the executive committee of the ASME International Applied Mechanics Division (AMD), and the five recent past chairs of the AMD. Upon receiving recommendations from the international community of applied mechanics, the Committee nominates a single medalist every year. This nomination is subsequently approved by the ASME; no case has been reported that the ASME has ever overruled a nomination of the Drucker Medal Committee. See the list of current members of the Committee.

== Recipients ==
Source: ASME

- 1998 Daniel C. Drucker
- 1999 Ascher H. Shapiro
- 2000 Philip G. Hodge Jr.
- 2001 Bruno A. Boley
- 2002 George J. Dvorak
- 2003 Leon M. Keer
- 2004 Frank A. McClintock
- 2005 Robert L. Taylor
- 2006 Alan Needleman
- 2007 Albert S. Kobayashi
- 2008 Thomas C.T. Ting
- 2009 James R. Barber
- 2010 Rohan Abeyaratne
- 2011 John W. Rudnicki
- 2012 James W. Dally
- 2013 Yonggang Huang, Northwestern University, USA.
- 2014 Lallit Anand, MIT
- 2015 Krishnaswami Ravi-Chandar, University of Texas at Austin
- 2016 Kyung-Suk Kim
- 2017 David M. Parks
- 2018 David M. Barnett
- 2019 John L. Bassani
- 2020 Glaucio H. Paulino
- 2021 Markus J. Buehler
- 2022 Horacio D. Espinosa, Northwestern University

== See also ==
- Applied Mechanics Division
- American Society of Mechanical Engineers
- Applied mechanics
- Mechanician
- List of engineering awards
- List of mechanical engineering awards
- List of awards named after people
