= Theodore von Karman Medal =

Engineering mechanics award

The Theodore von Karman Medal is an award of the American Society of Civil Engineers (ASCE) recognizing achievement in engineering mechanics applicable to any branch of civil engineering. The bronze medal is normally awarded annually, although it may be omitted in some years. It was established and endowed in 1960 by the ASCE Engineering Mechanics Division, now the Engineering Mechanics Institute, with gifts from friends and admirers of Theodore von Kármán. The medal has been described as the highest national award in engineering mechanics.

== Recipients ==
The recipients are as follows:

Year	Recipient
1960	William Prager
1961	Raymond D. Mindlin
1962	Nathan M. Newmark
1963	Hunter Rouse
1964	Eric Reissner
1965	Warner T. Koiter
1966	Daniel C. Drucker
1967	Maurice A. Biot
1968	Lloyd H. Donnell
1969	Geoffrey Ingram Taylor
1970	Wilhelm Flügge
1971	Alfred M. Freudenthal
1972	Nicholas J. Hoff
1973	Hans H. Bleich
1974	George W. Housner
1975	John H. Argyris
1976	Yuan-Cheng Fung
1977	George Francis Carrier
1978	Rodney Hill
1979	Henry L. Langhaar
1980	George Herrmann
1981	Chia-Shun Yih
1982	Bernard Budiansky
1983	Albert E. Green
1984	Stephen H. Crandall
1985	Philip G. Hodge
1986	Stanley Corrsin
1987	Richard Skalak
1988	Tung-Hua Lin
1989	Egor P. Popov
1990	John Dundurs
1991	Bruno A. Boley
1992	John Tinsley Oden
1993	Ronald S. Rivlin
1994	Masanobu Shinozuka
1995	Ray W. Clough
1996	Clifford A. Truesdell
1998	Y. K. Lin
1999	Ted Belytschko
2000	Robert H. Scanlan
2001	Anestis S. Veletsos
2002	Thomas K. Caughey
2003	Pol D. Spanos
2004	Theodore Yao-Tsu Wu
2005	Zdeněk P. Bažant
2006	George J. Dvorak
2007	Chiang C. Mei
2008	Siavouche Nemat-Nassar
2009	Thomas J. R. Hughes
2010	Jan D. Achenbach
2012	Franz-Josef Ulm
2013	Wilfred D. Iwan
2014	James R. Rice
2015	Ahsan Kareem
2016	Ares J. Rosakis
2017	Huajian Gao
2018	J. N. Reddy
2019	Yonggang Huang
2020	Katepalli R. Sreenivasan
2021	Fabrizio Vestroni
2022	Roger Ghanem
2023	Firdaus E. Udwadia
2024	George Z. Voyiadjis
2025	Somnath Ghosh
2026	Glaucio H. Paulino

== See also ==
- List of engineering awards
- List of prizes named after people
