= Chiang C. Mei =

Taiwanese-American physicist (1935–2026)

- Born: April 4, 1935; Wuchang, Wuhan, China
- Died: July 16, 2026 (aged 91); Waltham, Massachusetts, U.S.
- Education: National Taiwan University (BS); Stanford University (MS); California Institute of Technology (PhD)
- Awards: Theodore von Karman Medal (2007)
- Scientific career
- Fields: Fluid mechanics
- Workplaces: Massachusetts Institute of Technology
- Thesis: On the Initial Value Problems of Radiation and Scattering of Water Waves by Immersed Obstacles (1) and Gravity Waves Due to a Point Disturbance in a Stratified Flow (2) (1963)
- Doctoral advisor: Theodore Y. Wu

Chiang Chung "CC" Mei (Chinese: 梅強中; April 4, 1935 – July 16, 2026) was a Taiwanese-American physicist who was the Ford Professor of Engineering Emeritus at the Massachusetts Institute of Technology (MIT). He is known for his contributions in fluid mechanics with applications to civil, environmental, and coastal engineering.

== Early life and education ==
Mei was born in Wuchang, Wuhan, China on April 4, 1935. He received his B.S. (1955) from National Taiwan University, M.S. (1958) from Stanford University, and Ph.D. (1963) from California Institute of Technology.

== Career ==
Mei was an associate editor of the Journal of Fluid Mechanics. He received the Moffatt–Nichol Award in 1992 and the International Coastal Engineering Award in 1995, both from the American Society of Civil Engineers. He was awarded the Theodore von Karman Medal in 2007.

The 24th International Workshop on Water Waves and Floating Bodies of 2009 was dedicated to Mei on the occasion of his retirement. In the same year, the "C.C. Mei Symposium on Wave Mechanics and Hydrodynamics" was organised at the International Conference on Ocean, Offshore and Arctic Engineering (OMAE).

He was inducted into the National Academy of Engineering in 1986 for “application of the theories of wave hydrodynamics and elasticity to problems in coastal and ocean engineering.”

== Death ==
Mei died at his home in Waltham, Massachusetts, on July 16, 2026, at the age of 91.

== Books ==
- Chiang C. Mei (1989). The Applied Dynamics of Ocean Surface Waves. Singapore: World Scientific. ISBN 9971-5-0773-0.
- Chiang C. Mei (1997). Mathematical Analysis in Engineering. Cambridge University Press. ISBN 0-521-58798-0.
- Chiang C. Mei; Michael Stiassnie; Dick K.-P. Yue (2005). Theory and Applications of Ocean Surface Waves – Part 1, Linear Aspects; Part 2, Nonlinear Aspects. World Scientific Publishers. ISBN 981-238-8931.
- Chiang C. Mei; Bogdan Vernescu (2010). Homogenization Methods for Multiscale Mechanics. World Scientific Publishers. ISBN 978-981-428244-4.
