= Eringen Medal =

The A. C. Eringen Medal or Eringen Medal is an award given annually by the Society of Engineering Science (SES) to an individual "in recognition of sustained outstanding achievements in Engineering Science". This award was established in 1976. The actual award consists of a medal and an honorarium.

== Eringen Medal recipients ==
- 1976 Lofti Zadeh
- 1977 A. Cemal Eringen, Samuel C. C. Ting
- 1978 Raymond Flory
- 1979 Ian Sneddon
- 1980 Edward Teller
- 1981 Joseph B. Keller
- 1982 Harold Grad
- 1983 R. Byron Bird
- 1984 Kenneth G. Wilson
- 1985 Bernard Budiansky
- 1986 Paul M. Naghdi
- 1988 George Herrmann
- 1989 J. Tinsley Oden
- 1991 James K. Knowles
- 1992 Ray W. Clough
- 1993 Fazıl Erdoğan
- 1994 Charles F. Curtiss
- 1995 Satya N. Atluri
- 1996 Sivaramakrishna Chandrasekhar
- 1998 Pierre-Gilles de Gennes
- 1999 Michael F. Ashby
- 2000 E. Kroner
- 2003 Gerard Maugin
- 2004 K. R. Rajagopal
- 2005 Cornelius O. Horgan
- 2008 Subra Suresh
- 2010 Robert O. Ritchie
- 2011 Ares J. Rosakis
- 2012 David M. Barnett
- 2013 Guruswami Ravichandran
- 2014 John A. Rogers
- 2016 Gang Chen
- 2017 Xiang Zhang
- 2019 Evelyn Hu
- 2020 Thomas J.R. Hughes
- 2021 Ellen Arruda
- 2022 Catherine Brinson
- 2023 Glaucio Paulino
- 2024 Julia R. Greer
- 2025 Narayana Aluru

== See also ==
- List of engineering awards
- List of mechanical engineering awards
- Mechanician
