= Frank McClintock =

Frank McClintock may refer to:

- Frank McLintock (born 1939), Scottish former footballer
- Frank A. McClintock (1921–2011), American mechanical engineer in material science
