= Nicholas J. Hoff =

Hungarian-American engineer (1906–1997)

- Born: January 3, 1906; Magyaróvár, Hungary
- Died: August 4, 1997 (aged 91)
- Education: Stanford University
- Known for: Elastic stability of aerospace structures
- Awards: ASME Medal (1974); Theodore von Karman Medal (1972)
- Scientific career
- Fields: Applied mechanics
- Workplaces: Polytechnic Institute of Brooklyn, Stanford University
- Doctoral advisor: Stephen Timoshenko
- Doctoral students: A. Cemal Eringen, Bruno A. Boley

Nicholas J. Hoff (January 3, 1906, in Magyaróvár, Hungary – August 4, 1997) was a Hungarian-born American engineer specializing in aeronautics and astronautics, which he taught at Stanford University.

== Biography ==
Hoff spent his adolescence in Budapest, where he went to the same high school that had been attended by Leo Szilard, Eugene Wigner, and John von Neumann. After high school, he enrolled at ETH Zurich, where he studied under Aurel Stodola. He graduated with an engineering degree in 1928.

In 1938, Hoff moved to America, in order to study solid mechanics under Stephen Timoshenko, receiving his Ph.D. from Stanford University in 1942. His plans to return to Hungary were interrupted by the onset of the Second World War. In 1940, Hoff joined the Polytechnic Institute of Brooklyn as an instructor in aeronautical engineering, eventually becoming a full professor in 1946 and head of the Department of Mechanical and Aerospace Engineering in 1950. He subsequently joined the faculty of Stanford University in the fall of 1957.

He served as the chair of the ASME Applied Mechanics Division (1955).

== Awards and honors ==
- Worcester Reed Warner Medal, 1967
- Theodore von Karman Medal, 1972
- ASME Medal, 1974
- Daniel Guggenheim Medal, 1983
- Elected to the U.S. National Academy of Engineering
- Fellow of the Society for Experimental Mechanics, 1987
