= Ted Belytschko Applied Mechanics Award =

The Applied Mechanics Award is an award given annually by the Applied Mechanics Division of American Society of Mechanical Engineers (ASME) "to an outstanding individual for significant contributions in the practice of engineering mechanics; contributions may result from innovation, research, design, leadership or education." The Award is presented at the Applied Mechanics Annual Dinner at the ASME Congress. In 2008, the Award was renamed to the Ted Belytschko Applied Mechanics Award.

== Nomination procedure ==
A letter of nomination and several letters of support, along with any other supporting materials, should be sent by email to the chair of the executive committee of the Applied Mechanics Division. See the list of current members of the committee.

== Recipients ==
- 2023 – Jian Cao
- 2022 – Arif Masud
- 2021 – Ellen Kuhl
- 2020 – Narayana R. Aluru
- 2019 – Somnath Ghosh
- 2018 – Tayfun Tezduyar
- 2017 – Jiun-Shyan Chen
- 2016 – Andrea Prosperetti
- 2015 – James R. Barber
- 2014 – Glaucio Paulino
- 2013 – Guirong Liu
- 2012 – David J. Benson
- 2011 – Ken P. Chong, David K. Gartling
- 2010 – Yoichiro Matsumoto
- 2009 – Eugenio Oñate
- 2008 – Shih Choon Fong
- 2007 – Oscar W. Dillon
- 2006 – Lewis Wheeler
- 2005 – Carl Herakovich
- 2004 – Arthur Leissa
- 2003 – John O. Hallquist
- 2002 – David E. Newland
- 2001 – Dan Mote
- 2000 – Dick MacNeal
- 1999 – Karl Pister
- 1998 – John A. Swanson
- 1997 – Richard Skalak
- 1996 – Sheila Widnall
- 1995 – Harry Armen
- 1994 – Siegfried S. Hecker
- 1993 – David Hibbit
- 1992 – William G. Gottengerg
- 1991 – George Abrahamson
- 1990 – Owen Richmond
- 1989 – Sam Levy
- 1988 – H. Norman Abramson

== See also ==
- List of mechanical engineering awards
- Applied Mechanics Division
- American Society of Mechanical Engineers
- Applied mechanics
- Mechanician
