= Ahsan Kareem =

Engineering professor

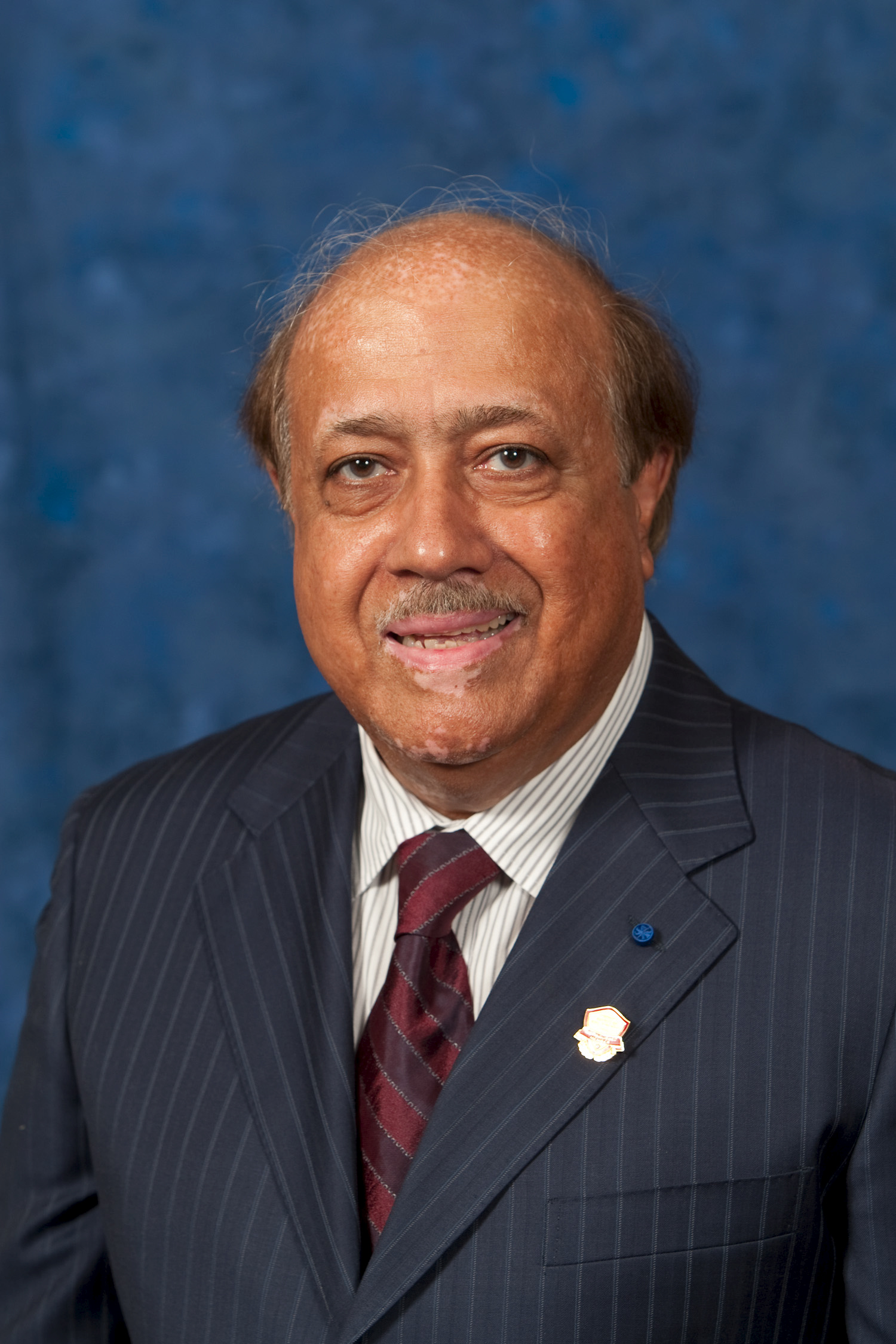
- Education: Colorado State University; University of Hawaii; Massachusetts Institute of Technology; West Pakistan University of Engineering and Technology
- Scientific career
- Workplaces: University of Notre Dame; Colorado State University; University of Houston
- Website: engineering.nd.edu/faculty/ahsan-kareem/

Ahsan Kareem is the Robert M. Moran Professor of Engineering in the Department of Civil & Environmental Engineering and Earth Sciences (CEEES) at the University of Notre Dame. He is Director of the Nathaz Modeling Laboratory and served as the past Chair at the Department of CEEES at the University of Notre Dame.

The focus of his work is on quantifying load effects caused by various natural hazards on structures and to develop innovative strategies to manage and mitigate their effects. The characterization and formulation of dynamic load effects due to wind, waves and earthquakes on tall buildings, long-span bridges, offshore structures and other structures is carried out via fundamental analytical computational methods, and experiments at laboratory, and full-scale. He directs NatHaz Group (NatHaz Modeling Laboratory) which focuses on developments in cyberspace virtual collaborative research platforms, e.g., virtual organizations, crowdsourcing, computational intelligence, living laboratories, sensing and actuation, citizen sensing, web-enabled analysis and design, scientific machine learning (SciML) and cloud-based computing.

His fundamental contributions to aerodynamics and aeroelasticity has led to advances in the analysis, design and performance assessment of tall buildings and long span bridges, high speed train aerodynamics, and land based and floating wind turbines. He has conducted from wind tunnel modeling to stochastic and CFD (Computational Fluid Dynamics) based simulations and finally to the full-scale monitoring of some of the signature buildings around the world including more recently Burj Khalifa. It utilizes a novel "SmartSync" system featuring "Internet-of-Things" (IoT) concept with built in layers of intelligence for data management and analysis. He has advanced models for damping in tall buildings and motion mitigation devices like tuned liquid dampers from design, prototype testing to post installation monitoring in buildings in the US and in the Pacific-rim. His contributions towards database assisted design through a web-portal recommended in ASCE 7 is used worldwide for designing tall buildings. More recently, his group has embarked on shape optimization of tall buildings based on CFD with embedded topology optimization to configure efficient and optimal structural systems, super tall buildings and long span bridges. He has developed prediction methods for quantifying hydrodynamic load effects and the attendant response of offshore structures under extreme environments and service loads. He has also contributed to a wide range of topics in the areas of offshore dynamics.

He introduced the use of the Wavelet and Shapelet transforms to signal processing and feature extractions and advanced the use of Volterra systems, POD, ICA, PCA and DMD for data analysis and modeling. He developed efficient simulation schemes for random vector processes: stationary/non-stationary; Gaussian/Non-Gaussian; Conditional/Un-Conditional utilizing spectral and time-series methods in conjunction with a novel scheme named "Stochastic Decomposition. He developed wind load models for non-synoptic winds like thunderstorms and downbursts and introduced the concept of Gust Front Factor and also developed models for hurricane wind field kinematics and dynamics. He developed safety and risk assessment schemes, performance-based design approach for wind effects and impact of climate change. In the area of Data Analytics and Machine Learning, he has contributed to data analytics, supervised, unsupervised and reinforcement learning; Bayesian Deep Convolution Neural Networks for random fields; Bayesian Deep learning; Dynamic Mode Decomposition; Surrogate Modeling with applications to structural engineering and dynamic loading; Digital Virtual Twins; Fusion of CFD, Stochastics, Machine Learning and beyond; Autonomous morphing of structures through sensing, computations and actuation.

In 2009, Kareem was elected a member of the National Academy of Engineering for contributions to analyses and designs to account for wind effects on tall buildings, long-span bridges, and other structures. He currently serves as the President of the International Association for Wind Engineering. He was also the former President of the American Association for Wind Engineering.

== Awards and honors ==
=== Membership to Academies ===
- 2009, Member, US National Academy of Engineering (NAE)
- 2017, Foreign Member, Chinese Academy of Engineering (CAE)
- 2020, Foreign Member, The Engineering Academy of Japan (EAJ)
- 2010, Foreign Fellow, Indian National Academy of Engineering (INAE)
- 2025, Member, European Academy of Sciences and Arts (EASA)
- 2025, Member, European Academy of Sciences (EurASc)

=== Medals ===
- 1968: Greaves Cotton & Co., UK, Gold Medal for being the Best Civil Engineering Graduate, Pakistan University of Engineering and Technology
- 2002: Jack E. Cermak Medal, ASCE
- 2005: Robert H. Scanlan Medal, ASCE
- 2007: A. G. Davenport Medal, International Association for Wind Engineering Senior Research Award
- 2015: Theodore von Kármán Medal, ASCE
- 2015: James Croes Medal, ASCE
- 2017: Masanobu Shinozuka Medal, ASCE
- 2019: Earnest Howard Medal, ASCE
- 2021: Nathan M. Newmark Medal, ASCE
- 2022: James Croes Medal, ASCE
- 2025: Archimedes Medal for Outstanding Contribution in Engineering Science
- 2026: Wilfred D. Iwan Award/Medal for Mentors in Mechanics Research

=== Other prizes, awards and honors ===
- 1984: Presidential Young Investigator Award
- 2008: ASCE Civil Engineering State-of-the-Art Award
- 2009: Research Achievement Award, 9th Annual University of Notre Dame Research Achievement Award
- 2010: Elected Distinguished Member of ASCE
- 2011: Inducted to the Offshore Technology Conference Hall of Fame, ASCE/COPRI
- 2012: Inducted Honorary Member of the Japan Association for Wind Engineering
- 2013: Distinguished Research Award, International Association of Structural Safety and Reliability
- 2016: Alfred Noble Prize, ASME, IEEE, ASCE
- 2020: The International Award of Merit in Structural Engineering, IABSE
- 2023: Inaugural International award by the Chinese Society for Vibration Engineering (CSVE)
- 2023: Elected American Association for the Advancement of Science (AAAS) lifetime fellow

=== Honorary and guest professorships ===
- 2010: Honorary Professor of Tongji University, Shanghai, PROC
- 2012–2018: Honorary Professor, Hong Kong Polytechnic University, HK
- 2014: Visiting Professor, Beijing Jiatong University, Beijing, China
- 2016: Honorary Professor, Central South University, Changsha, China.
- 2017: Guest Professor, Chongqing University, Chongqing, China
- 2017: Honorary Professor, Southeast University, Nanjing, China
- 2020: Honorary Professor, Tsinghua University, China
- 2021: Qiushi Chair Professor of Zhejiang University, Hangzhou, China
