= Somnath Ghosh =

Professor at Johns Hopkins University

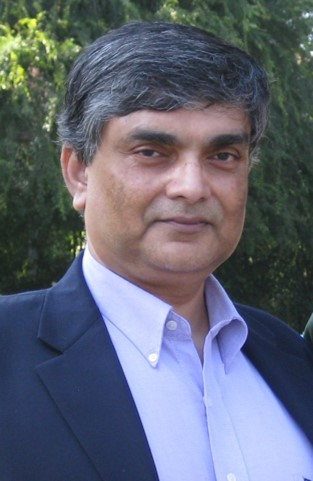
- Education: University of Michigan (Ph.D.); Cornell University (M.S.); Indian Institute of Technology Kharagpur (B.Tech.)
- Title: Michael G. Callas Chair Professor, Johns Hopkins University; John B. Nordholt Chair Professor, Ohio State University
- Scientific career
- Thesis: A new finite element description for large deformation analysis of elastic-viscoplastic solids with applications in metal forming (1988)
- Doctoral advisor: Noboru Kikuchi
- Website: cmrl.jhu.edu/people/somnath-ghosh/

Somnath Ghosh is the Michael G. Callas Endowed Chair Professor in the Department of Civil & Systems Engineering and a Professor of Mechanical Engineering and Materials Science & Engineering at Johns Hopkins University (JHU). He is the founding director of the JHU Center for Integrated Structure-Materials Modeling and Simulation (CISMMS) and was the director of an Air Force Center of Excellence in Integrated Materials Modeling (CEIMM). Prior to his appointment at JHU, Ghosh was the John B. Nordholt Professor of Mechanical Engineering and Materials Science & Engineering at Ohio State University. He is a fellow of several professional societies, including the American Association for the Advancement of Science (AAAS).

== Education ==
Somnath Ghosh obtained his B.Tech. degree in Mechanical Engineering from the Indian Institute of Technology Kharagpur, M.S. degree in Theoretical & Applied Mechanics from Cornell University, and Ph.D. in Mechanical Engineering & Applied Mechanics from the University of Michigan.

== Career ==
Following his Ph.D., Ghosh started his academic career as an Assistant Professor of Engineering Mechanics at the University of Alabama in 1988. He joined Ohio State University in 1991 as an Assistant Professor and became the John B. Nordholt Professor of Mechanical Engineering in 2004. In 2011, Ghosh joined Johns Hopkins University as the Michael G. Callas Chair Professor in Civil Engineering and Professor of Mechanical Engineering. In 2012, he became the director and principal investigator (PI) of a multi-institutional Air Force Center of Excellence in Integrated Materials Modeling (CEIMM). In 2013, he founded the JHU Center for Integrated Structure-Materials Modeling and Simulations (CISMMS), a multidisciplinary research center to foster advances in Computational Structure-Material Analysis and Design. From 2023 is co-director of the NASA Space Technology Research Institute for Model-based Qualification and Certification of Additive Manufacturing (IMQCAM).

Ghosh has assumed leadership roles in the professional scientific community. He was the President (2014-2016), Vice President (2012-2014) and Secretary (2010-2012) of the US Association of Computational Mechanics (USACM). As President, he established Technical Thrust Areas, or TTAs, to target specific fields of research and advancement for expansion within USACM. He served on the Board of Governors of the Engineering Mechanics Institute (EMI) of ASCE, as the Vice President. Ghosh is on the general council of the International Association of Computational Mechanics (IACM). He serves on the editorial board of 14 journals and serves on industrial and government advisory boards.

== Research ==
Ghosh is a researcher in the field of Computational Mechanics of Materials, working in multiscale and multiphysics modeling and Integrated Computational Materials Engineering (ICME). He directs the Computational Mechanics Research Laboratory (CMRL) at Johns Hopkins University. Ghosh has made contributions to the computational study of fatigue and failure in metals and composites with applications in the aerospace, propulsion, automotive and manufacturing industries. He and coauthors created the Voronoi Cell Finite Element Method (VCFEM) for micromechanical modeling, the wavelet transformation-induced multi-time scaling (WATMUS) method and parametrically upscaled constitutive models (PUCMs) for fatigue and failure prediction. Ghosh's recent research work integrating computational mechanics and materials models with machine learning focuses on additive manufacturing, multifunctional applications like deformable sensors, and life prediction methods.

Ghosh has published over 250 peer reviewed journal articles, authored a book entitled Micromechanical Analysis and Multi-Scale Modeling Using the Voronoi Cell Finite Element Method and edited two books, Integrated Computational Materials Engineering (ICME): Advancing Computational and Experimental Methods and Computational Methods for Microstructure-Property Relations. He also edited a section in the Handbook of Materials Modeling. Volume 1 Methods: Theory and Modeling.

== Awards and honors ==
=== Awards ===
- 2025: Theodore von Karman Medal, American Society of Civil Engineers (ASCE)
- 2024: JN Reddy Medal, Mechanics of Advanced Materials and Structures (MAMS) Journal
- 2023: Distinguished Scientist/Engineer Award, Materials Processing & Manufacturing Division, The Minerals, Metals, and Materials Society (TMS)
- 2022: Raymond D. Mindlin Medal, American Society of Civil Engineers (ASCE)
- 2021: The J. Tinsley Oden Medal, U.S. Association for Computational Mechanics (USACM)
- 2020: Computational Mechanics Award, International Association for Computational Mechanics (IACM)
- 2019: Ted Belytschko Applied Mechanics Award, ASME Applied Mechanics Division (AMD)
- 2018: ICCM Investigator Medal, International Conference on Computational Methods, Rome, Italy
- 2017: Distinguished Scientist/Engineer Award, Structural Materials Division, The Minerals, Metals & Materials Society (TMS)
- 2013: Distinguished Alumnus Award, Indian Institute of Technology (IIT), Kharagpur
- 2013: Nathan M. Newmark Medal, American Society of Civil Engineers (ASCE)
- 2007: University Distinguished Scholar Award, The Ohio State University
- 2001: Harrison Faculty Award for Excellence in Engineering Education, The Ohio State University
- 1994: NSF National Young Investigator Award, National Science Foundation

=== Fellows of Professional Societies ===
- 2021: Fellow, The Minerals, Metals and Materials Society (TMS)
- 2019: Fellow, Society of Engineering Science (SES)
- 2014: Fellow, Engineering Mechanics Institute (EMI), American Society of Civil Engineers (ASCE)
- 2010: Fellow, International Association of Computational Mechanics (IACM)
- 2010: Fellow, American Academy of Mechanics (AAM)
- 2007: Fellow, American Association for the Advancement of Science (AAAS)
- 2007: Fellow, United States Association of Computational Mechanics (USACM)
- 2006: Fellow, ASM International, The Materials Information Society
- 2000: Fellow, American Society of Mechanical Engineers (ASME)
