= Gérard Maugin =

French engineering scientist (1944–2016)

Gérard Albert Michel Maugin (born 2 December 1944 in Angers – 22 September 2016 in Villejuif) was a French engineering scientist.

== Education ==
Maugin acquired his engineering degree in mechanical engineering in 1966 at the Ecole Nationale Supérieure d'Arts et Métiers (Ensam) and he continued his studies at the school of aeronautics Sup Aéro in Paris until 1968. In 1966 he worked for the French Ministry of Defence on ballistic missiles. In 1968 he received his (DEA) degree in hydrodynamics in Paris. In 1969, he earned his master's degree from Princeton University, where he graduated in 1971 (Ph.D.). He was a NASA International Fellow between 1968 and 1970. In 1971/72 he was an officer in the French Air Force. In 1975 he received his doctorate in mathematics (Doctorat d'Etat) at the University of Paris VI (Pierre et Marie Curie), where he also taught and directed a team at the Laboratoire de Mécanique Théorique conducting research since 1985 on Continuum mechanics and Theoretical Mechanics. After its name change to the Laboratoire de Modélisation en Mécanique (LMM), he headed this from 1998. From 1979 he was Director of Research at CNRS.

He was a visiting professor and visiting scientist at Princeton, Belgrade, Warsaw, Istanbul, at the Royal Institute of Technology in Stockholm, at the TU Berlin, Rome, Tel Aviv, the Lomonosov University, Kyoto, Darmstadt and Berkeley.

His work deals with continuum mechanics, including relativistic continuum mechanics, micro magnetism, electrodynamics of continua, thermo mechanics, surface waves and nonlinear waves in continua, lattice dynamics, material equations and biomechanical applications (tissue growth).

== Recognition ==
In 2001 he received the Max Planck Research Award, was the 1991/92 Fellow of the Berlin Institute for Advanced Study, and in 2001 received an honorary doctorate from the Technical University of Darmstadt . In 1982 he received the Prix Paul Doistau–Émile Blutet of the French Academy of Sciences and in 1977 the Medal of the CNRS in physics and engineering.

He was a member of the Polish Academy of Sciences (1994), of the Estonian Academy of Sciences and was awarded an honorary professorship by the Moscow State University. In 2003, he received the A. Cemal Eringen Medal.

== Writings ==
- Nonlinear electromechanical effects and applications, World Scientific 1985
- Continuum mechanics of electromagnetic solids, North Holland 1988
- with AC Eringen : Electrodynamics of continua, 2 volumes, Springer Verlag 1990
- Nonlinear electromechanical couplings, Wiley 1992
- Material inhomogeneities in elasticity, Chapman and Hall 1993
- The thermo-mechanics of nonlinear irreversible behaviors: an introduction, World Scientific 1999
- Nonlinear waves in elastic crystals, Oxford University Press 1999
- with Arkadi Berezovski, Jüri Engelbrecht Numerical simulation of waves and fronts in inhomogeneous solids, World Scientific 2008
- Editor with Holm Altenbach, Vladimir Erofeev Mechanics of Generalized Continua, Springer Verlag 2011
- Configurational forces, Chapman and Hall 2011
- Continuum Mechanics through the twentieth century, Springer 2013
