= Thomas K. Caughey Dynamics Award =

Engineering award

The Thomas K. Caughey Dynamics Award is an award given annually by the Applied Mechanics Division, of American Society of Mechanical Engineers (ASME), "in recognition of an individual who has made significant contributions to the field of nonlinear dynamics through practice, research, teaching, and/or outstanding leadership" The Award is presented at the Applied Mechanics Annual Dinner at the ASME IMECE Congress. In 2020 the Award was elevated to the society level and renamed Thomas K. Caughey Dynamics Medal.

== Nomination procedure ==
A letter of nomination, three letters of support, along with any other supporting materials, should be sent by email to the chair of the executive committee of the Applied Mechanics Division. See the list of current members of the Committee

== Recipients ==
- 2022 – Earl H. Dowell (Duke University)
- 2020 – Pol Spanos (Rice University)
- 2019 – Anil K. Bajaj (Purdue University) and Steven Shaw (Florida Institute of Technology)
- 2018 – Firdaus Udwadia (University of Southern California)
- 2017 – Richard Rand (Cornell University)
- 2015 – Gabor Stepan (Budapest University of Technology and Economics)
- 2014 – Alexander F. Vakakis (University of Illinois at Urbana-Champaign)
- 2013 – Lothar Gaul (University of Stuttgart)
- 2012 – Francis Charles Moon (Cornell University)
- 2011 – Philip Holmes (Princeton University)
- 2010 – Jerrold E. Marsden (California Institute of Technology)
- 2009 – Stephen H. Crandall (Massachusetts Institute of Technology)
- 2008 – Ali H. Nayfeh (Virginia Tech)

== See also ==
- List of mechanical engineering awards
- Applied mechanics
- Mechanician
