= Cavitation (elastomers) =

Expansion of a microscopic void in a solid elastomer

Cavitation is the unstable unhindered expansion of a microscopic void in a solid elastomer under the action of tensile hydrostatic stresses. This can occur whenever the hydrostatic tension exceeds 5/6 of Young's modulus.

The cavitation phenomenon may manifest in any of the following situations:

- imposed hydrostatic tensile stress acting on a pre-existing void
- void pressurization due to gases that are generated due to chemical action (as in volatilization of low-molecular weight waxes or oils: 'blowpoint' for insufficiently cured rubber, or 'thermal blowout' for systems operating at very high temperature)
- void pressurization due to gases that come out of solution (as in gases dissolved at high pressure)
