= Ray William Clough =

American engineer and academic (1920–2016)

Dr. Ray W. Clough
- Born: July 23, 1920; Seattle, Washington
- Died: October 8, 2016 (aged 96)
- Education: University of Washington, B.S. (1942), Massachusetts Institute of Technology Sc.D.(1949)
- Engineering career
- Discipline: structural engineering, earthquake engineering
- Institutions: University of California, Berkeley
- Awards: National Academy of Engineering, National Academy of Sciences, Royal Norwegian Scientists Society, Chinese Academy of Engineering, National Medal of Science, Benjamin Franklin Medal

Ray William Clough (July 23, 1920 – October 8, 2016) was Byron L. and Elvira E. Nishkian Professor of structural engineering in the department of civil engineering at the University of California, Berkeley and one of the founders of the finite element method (FEM). His 1956 article was one of the first applications of this computational method. He coined the term "finite elements" in an article in 1960. He was born in Seattle and died on October 8, 2016, aged 96.

== Contributions ==
Clough made contributions in the field of earthquake engineering, in particular with the development and application of a mathematical method, finite element analysis, which has applications in numerical modeling of the physical world. Dr. Clough extended the method to enable dynamic analysis of complex structures and co-authored, with Joseph Penzien, a text on structural dynamics. As of 2025, the second edition (revised) of this text is still in print and widely used.

A series of papers that appeared in the 1960s and 1970s presented new and accurate methods utilizing the finite element concept for earthquake analysis of earth dams and concrete dams. During the 1970s and 1980s he directed his research toward experiments on concrete, steel, and masonry buildings and liquid-storage tanks using the UC Berkeley EERC shaking table.

Clough and Joe Penzien with support from Jack Bouwkamp developed the Earthquake Engineering Research Center (EERC) at UC Berkeley, a hub for analytical engineering research, information resources, and public service programs. The proposal was submitted in 1967 and EERC began operations in 1968.

== Awards and honors ==
- The Prince Philip Medal from the Royal Academy of Engineering in London
- National Academy of Sciences, the National Academy of Engineering (1968),
- the Royal Norwegian Scientists Society
- the Chinese Academy of Engineering.
- He was awarded the A. Cemal Eringen Medal (1992),
- George W. Housner Medal by the Earthquake Engineering Research Institute (1996).
- In 1994, Vice President Al Gore presented Clough with a National Medal of Science. The citation reads For his outstanding contributions in the fields of finite element analysis, structural dynamics, and earthquake engineering which had extraordinary influence in the development of modern engineering.
- In 2006 he was presented the Benjamin Franklin Medal in Civil Engineering from The Franklin Institute.
