= Ellen Kuhl =

Professor at Stanford University

- Born: Hanover, Germany
- Education: Technical University of Kaiserslautern (habil.); University of Stuttgart (Ph.D.); Leibniz University of Hanover (Dipl.-Ing.)
- Known for: Living Matter Physics
- Title: Catherine Holman Johnson Director of Stanford Bio-X and Walter B. Reinhold Professor in the School of Engineering, Stanford University
- Awards: Humboldt Research Award (2016); ASME Ted Belytschko Applied Mechanics Award (2021)
- Website: profiles.stanford.edu/ellen-kuhl,livingmatter.stanford.edu

Ellen Kuhl is the Catherine Holman Johnson Director of Stanford Bio-X and the Walter B. Reinhold Professor in the School of Engineering at Stanford University. She is a Professor of Mechanical Engineering and, by courtesy, Bioengineering. Kuhl has is known for her research on Automated Model Discovery and Living Matter Physics, the design of theoretical and computational models to simulate and predict the behavior of living systems including the human brain and the living heart.

== Bibliography ==
Kuhl grew up in Germany, and now lives in Palo Alto, California. She received her bachelor's and master's degrees in computational engineering from the Leibniz University of Hanover in 1993 and 1995, her Ph.D. in civil engineering from the University of Stuttgart in 2000, and her habilitation in mechanics from the Technical University of Kaiserslautern in 2004. She was appointed as assistant professor at the Technical University of Kaiserslautern in 2002, and joined the department of mechanical engineering at Stanford University in 2007. In 2011, she accepted a position at ETH Zurich, but returned to Stanford in 2012. She was promoted to full professor in 2016, and named the Walter B. Reinhold Professor in 2021. From 2019 to 2024, Kuhl has been the department chair of mechanical engineering. Since 2024, she is the director of Bio-X, the first interdisciplinary life sciences institute at Stanford.

== Research ==
Kuhl's research integrates physics-based modeling with machine learning and creates interactive simulation tools to understand, explore, and predict the dynamics of living systems. She has pioneered theories and algorithms for automated model discovery and living systems, and applies these theories to brain development, brain damage, neurodegeneration, Alzheimer's disease, tissue expansion, heart failure, dilated and hypertrophic cardiomyopathy. During the COVID-19 pandemic, her lab was among the first to use data-driven modeling to integrate classical epidemiology modeling and machine learning to infer critical disease parameters, in real time, from reported data to make informed predictions and guide political decision making. This work gained recognition during a legal challenge of the Newfoundland travel ban and in a study of superspreading events on college campuses.

== Awards and honors ==
Kuhl is a Fellow of the American Society of Mechanical Engineers and of the American Institute for Medical and Biological Engineering. She received the National Science Foundation Career Award in 2010, was selected as Midwest Mechanics Seminar Speaker in 2014, and received the Humboldt Research Award in 2016, the ASME Ted Belytschko Applied Mechanics Award in 2021, and the ERC Advanced Grant in 2024.

== Personal life ==
Kuhl is an All American triathlete. She ran the New York City Marathon in 2009, 2016, 2017, 2019, 2020, 2021, 2024, the Zurich Marathon in 2011, the San Francisco Marathon in 2013, the Chicago Marathon in 2017, and the Boston Marathon annually since 2018. She competed in seven Ironmans and ten 70.3s, including the 2019, 2022, 2023 Ironman World Championship in Kona and the 2021 Ironman 70.3 World Championship and Ironman World Championship in St. George.

== Selected publications ==
- Alber M, Buganza Tepole A, Cannon W, De S, Dura-Bernal S, Garikipati K, Karniadakis G, Lytton WW, Perdikaris P, Petzold L, Kuhl E. Integrating machine learning and multiscale modeling: Perspectives, challenges, and opportunities in the biological, biomedical, and behavioral sciences. npj Digital Medicine; 2019; 2:115. PMID 31799423.
- Baillargeon B, Rebelo N, Fox DD, Taylor RL, Kuhl E. The Living Heart Project: A robust and integrative simulator for human heart function. Eur J Mech A/Solids. 2014;48:38-47. PMID 25267880
- Budday S, Nay R, de Rooij R, Steinmann P, Wyrobek T, Ovaert TC, Kuhl E. Mechanical properties of gray and white matter brain tissue by indentation. J Mech Behavior Biomed Mat. 2015;46:318-330. PMID 25819199
- Budday S, Sommer G, Hayback J, Steinmann P, Holzapfel GA, Kuhl E. Rheological characterization of human brain tissue. Acta Biomat. 2017; 60:315-329. PMID 28658600
- Goriely A, Geers MGD, Holzapfel GA, Jayamohan J, Jerusalem A, Sivaloganathan S, Squier W, van Dommelen JAW, Waters S, Kuhl E. Mechanics of the brain: Perspectives, challenges, and opportunities. Biomech Mod Mechanobio. 2015;14:931-965. PMID 25716305
- Kuhl E. Biophysics: Unfolding the brain. Nature Physics. 2016;12:533-534. doi:10.1038/nphys3641
- Kuhl E. Connectomics of neurodegeneration. Nat Neurosci. 2019; 22:1200–1202. doi:10.1038/s41593-019-0459-3
- Kuhl E. Computational Epidemiology: Data-Driven Modeling of COVID-19, Springer Nature, 2021. ISBN 978-3-030-82889-9.
- Linka K, Peirlinck M, Sahli Costabal F, Kuhl E. Outbreak dynamics of COVID-19 in Europe and the effect of travel restrictions. Comp Meth Biomech Biomed Eng; 2020; 23:710-717.PMID 32367739
- Linka K, Peirlinck M, Kuhl E. The reproduction number of COVID-19 and its correlation with public health interventions. Comp Mech. 2020; 66:1035-1050. PMID 32836597
- Peirlinck M, Linka K, Sahli Costabal F, Kuhl E. Outbreak dynamics of COVID-19 in China and the United States. Biomech Model Mechanobio; 2020; 19:2179-2193.PMID 32342242
- Peirlinck M, Sahli Costabal F, Yao J, Guccione JM, Tripathy S, Wang Y, Ozturk D, Segars P, Morrison TM, Levine S, Kuhl E. Precision medicine in human heart modeling. Perspectives, challenges and opportunities. Biomech Model Mechanobio. 2021; 20:803-831. PMID 33580313
- Sahli Costabal F, Yang Y, Perdikaris P, Hurtado DE, Kuhl E. Physics-informed neural networks for cardiac activation mapping. Front Phys. 2020; 8:42. doi:10.3389/fphy.2020.00042
- Schafer A, Peirlinck M, Linka K, Kuhl E. Bayesian physics-based modeling of tau propagation in Alzheimer's disease. Front Physiology. 2021; 12:702975. PMID 34335308
