= Gábor Stépán =

Gábor Stépán (pronounced [ˈɡaːbor ˈʃteːpaːn]; born December 13, 1953, in Budapest), Hungarian professor of applied mechanics, member of the Hungarian Academy of Sciences, fellow of the International Academy for Production Engineering (CIRP), fellow of the Society for Industrial and Applied Mathematics (SIAM), former dean of the Faculty of Mechanical Engineering in the Budapest University of Technology and Economics. Won the Széchenyi Prize in 2011, the Thomas K. Caughey Dynamics Award (ASME Applied Mechanics Division) in 2015, and the Delay Systems Lifetime Achievements Award (International Federation of Automatic Control, IFAC) in 2021. His research fields include nonlinear vibrations, delay-differential equations, and stability theory. He was elected as a fellow of the Society for Industrial and Applied Mathematics in 2017, "for contributions to the theory and analysis of delayed dynamical systems and their applications".

== Biography ==
Member of the Society for Industrial and Applied Mathematics since 1992, ASME International since 2013, and Euromech since 2000. Chief editor of Periodica Polytechnica (1993-1994). Member of the editorial board of the following scientific journals: Journal of Vibration and Control (1994-2014), Journal of Nonlinear Science (1995-2017), Journal of Computational and Applied Mechanics (2000-2005), Philosophical Transactions of the Royal Society (2005-2010), Mechanism and Machine Theory (2006-), Physica D (1995-2019), ASME Journal Nonlinear and Computational Dynamics (2013-2018), and Nonlinear Dynamics (2014-).

== Work ==
His research areas are:

- Analytical mechanics: stability theory, delay systems, nonlinear vibrations
- Differential equations: bifurcation theory, delay differential equations, chaos
- Applications in mechanical engineering: nonlinear dynamics of wheels, vibration and stability issues of robots, force control, stabilization of unstable equilibria and motions, human balancing, machine tool vibrations, active nonlinear suspension systems, rehabilitation robotics

== Main publications ==
Gabor Stepan is author of more than one hundred scientific publications. Books:

- Retarded Dynamical Systems (Wiley, NY, 1989)
- Semi-Discretization for Time-Delay Systems (Springer, NY, 2011)

== Sources ==
- A Magyar Tudományos Akadémia tagjai 1825–2002 III. (R–ZS). Főszerk. Glatz Ferenc. Budapest: MTA Társadalomkutató Központ. 2003. 1165–1166. o.
- MTI Ki Kicsoda 2009, Magyar Távirati Iroda Zrt., Budapest, 2008, 1005. old., ISSN 1787-288X
- Profile on the Hungarian Academy of Sciences webpage, with the list of publications
- official homepage
