= Tayfun Tezduyar =

Mechanical engineer

Tayfun E. Tezduyar is a mechanical engineer. He is known for his studies on the techniques of stabilizing the finite element methods.

Tezduyar obtained his master's degree and doctorate at the California Institute of Technology in 1978 and 1982, respectively. He was then a postdoctoral fellow at Stanford University prior to joining the University of Houston faculty in January 1983. Tezduyar assumed an associate professorship at the University of Minnesota in 1987, and was named a full professor in 1991. In 1997, Tezduyar was appointed Distinguished McKnight University Professor. He left Minnesota for the James F. Barbour Professorship in Mechanical Engineering at Rice University in 1998. Tezduyar was listed as an ISI highly cited researcher in 2016. Tezduyar chaired the Applied Mechanics Division of the American Society of Mechanical Engineers in 2011, and was awarded its Ted Belytschko Applied Mechanics Award in 2018. In 2019, he was awarded the Computational Mechanics Award by the Asian Pacific Association for Computational Mechanics. Since 2017, in addition to his position at Rice University, he has been working as a Professor at the Science and Engineering Faculty of Waseda University in Tokyo, Japan.
