= Henry L. Langhaar =

American mathematician (1909–1992)

Henry Louis Langhaar
- Born: October 14, 1909; Bristol, Connecticut
- Died: September 28, 1992 (aged 82); Corydon, Indiana
- Education: Lehigh University
- Spouse: Isabelle Langhaar
- Awards: Theodore von Karman Medal (1979)
- Scientific career
- Fields: engineering mechanics
- Institutions: University of Illinois at Urbana-Champaign

Henry Louis Langhaar (October 14, 1909 – September 28, 1992) was a mathematician, engineer, researcher, educator, and author in the field of engineering mechanics. In 1978, he retired as Professor Emeritus, after 31 years in the Department of Theoretical & Applied Mechanics (TAM) (Note: The TAM department at the University of Illinois was founded in 1890. In 2006, the College of Engineering combined the TAM and Mechanical and Industrial Engineering departments to form Mechanical Science and Engineering (MechSE).) at the University of Illinois at Urbana-Champaign.

His interests were centered on dimensional analysis, spanning fluid to solid mechanics, and specific research areas included aircraft structures, plates and shells, and buckling theory.

== Early life ==
Langhaar was born on October 14, 1909, in Bristol, Connecticut. He attended high school in Hackettstown, New Jersey. He received his bachelor's and master's degrees in mechanical engineering from Lehigh University in 1931 and 1933, respectively. From 1933 to 1936, Langhaar worked as a Test Engineer for the Ingersoll-Rand Corporation, and from 1936 to 1937 as a seismographer with the Carter Oil Company.

While working with Carter Oil in Anthony, Kansas, he met his future wife, Isabelle Babcock, a school teacher, whom he married in 1937. He returned to Lehigh University later that year and in 1940 obtained his Ph.D. in mathematics. His thesis title was "Steady Flow in the Transition Length of a Cylindrical Conduit."

Langhaar was an instructor in mathematics at Purdue University during 1940–1941, where he also took classes in mechanics offered by the eminent theoretical physicist and applied mathematician Cornelius Lanczos. Langhaar would remark later in life: "Lanczos’ epistemology and the harsh realities of engineering problems did much to shape my attitudes towards mechanics." Langhaar worked as a structural engineer from 1941-1947 at Consolidated-Vultee AirCraft Corporation (Convair) in San Diego, California. At Convair he worked on aircraft design problems involving plates and shells, buckling, diagonal tension beams, plate-stringer combinations, cut-outs in shells, and fuselages.

== Career at the University of Illinois at Urbana-Champaign ==
In 1947, Langhaar took a position as an Associate Professor of Theoretical and Applied Mechanics at the University of Illinois at Urbana-Champaign and advanced to Professor two years later. He developed many of the graduate-level TAM courses, including Dimensional Analysis, Theory of Shells, Theory of Buckling, and Energy Methods, and he directed 30 students toward doctoral degrees.

Langhaar’s academic achievements earned him international recognition for numerous areas of solid mechanics and applied mathematics. He authored two widely used graduate textbooks: Dimensional Analysis and the Theory of Models, and Energy Methods in Applied Mechanics. Dimensional Analysis and the Theory of Models, written in 1951, became a "classic text" in the field. He also coauthored an elementary text, Engineering Mechanics.

Langhaar was the author or coauthor of more than 40 technical papers covering a broad spectrum of applied mechanics and mathematics, including hydrodynamics, structural analysis, aircraft structures, plate and shell theories, stability of mechanical systems, buckling theory, dimensional analysis, stress functions, numerical methods, applied elasticity theory, elastic stability theory, viscoelasticity, vibrations, complementary energy, strength of cooling towers, population theory, and engineering education.

In 1958, Langhaar was one of three U.S. engineers to go to the Soviet Union on an exchange sponsored by the State Department. From 1960 to 1962 he was a visiting professor at the Indian Institute of Technology Kharagpur.

== Honors and awards ==
Langhaar was named a Fellow of the American Society of Mechanical Engineers (ASME) in 1964 and, as of 1978, had served on the review board of Applied Mechanics Reviews since its founding. He was the recipient of the 1979 Theodore von Karman Medal, bestowed by the American Society of Civil Engineers (ASCE), for his contributions to the mechanics of fluids and solids, and especially for his noteworthy works in dimensional analysis, energy principles, and theories of shells. In 1983, he received the University of Illinois College of Engineering Alumni Honor Award for Distinguished Service "for his original contributions in several areas of mechanics and applied mathematics and for his ability to communicate these ideas as a teacher to his students."

== Books ==
- Langhaar, Dimensional analysis and theory of models. Huntington, NY: R.E. Krieger Pub. Co., 1980. (Original work: Wiley, 1951)
- Langhaar and A. P. Boresi, Engineering mechanics. McGraw-Hill, 1959.
- Langhaar, Energy methods in applied mechanics. New York: Wiley, 1962.
