= L. B. Abeyaratne =

L.B. "Malcolm" Abeyaratne, CCS was a Sri Lankan civil servant. He was the former Permanent Secretary of the Ministry of Finance & Treasury Educated at the Royal College, Colombo, he is a graduate from the University College, Colombo. Joining the Ceylon Civil Service he went on to serve as Government Agent of Ratnapura and Kurunegala before moving into the Treasury, where he served as Deputy Secretary of the Treasury. After his retirement he moved to New Zealand where he died.

He married Enid Dias Jayasinghe, who was on the Board of Trustees of the Ceylon Schools for the Deaf & Blind and a founding member of Sri Lanka Sumithrayo in Kandy. They had two sons and one daughter. Their eldest son is Professor Rohan Abeyaratne, Director of the Singapore–MIT Alliance for Research and Technology.
