= Richard Skalak =

American biomedical engineer

- Born: February 5, 1923; New York City
- Died: August 17, 1997 (aged 74); San Diego, California
- Scientific career
- Fields: Biomedical engineering
- Workplaces: Columbia University

Richard Skalak (February 5, 1923 – August 17, 1997) was an American pioneer in biomedical engineering. He is known for his groundbreaking work in the mechanics of blood flow, bone growth, white blood cell response to infections, and biological implications and responses to implants. He won numerous significant scientific honors over his career, including election to the National Academy of Engineering in 1988. He is the namesake of the ASME Richard Skalak Award.

== Awards and honors ==
- Chair Applied Mechanics Division, 1979
- Theodore von Karman Medal, 1987
- National Academy of Engineering, 1988
- Ted Belytschko Applied Mechanics Award, 1997
- Poiseuille Medal of the International Society of Biorheology
- Fellow, American Society of Mechanical Engineers
- Fellow, American Academy of Mechanics
- Fellow, American Society of Civil Engineers
- Fellow, New York Academy of Medicine
- Fellow, American Association for the Advancement of Science
