= Wilhelm Flügge =

German engineer (1904–1990)

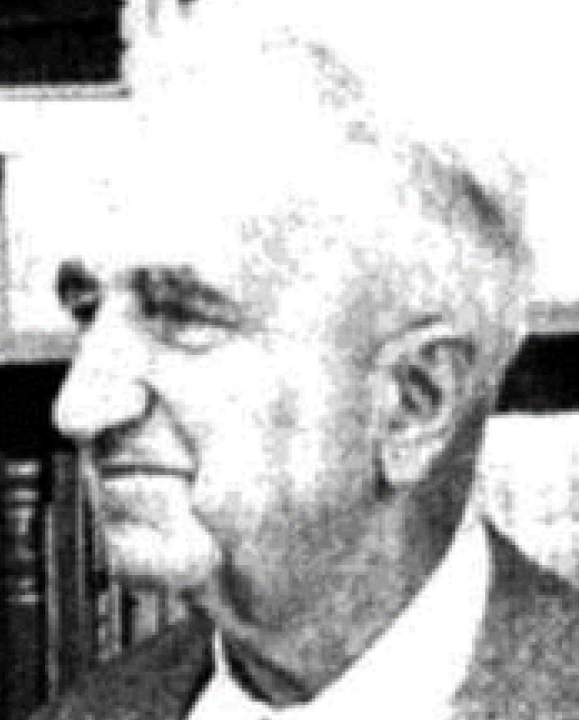

Gottfried Wilhelm Flügge (March 18, 1904 – March 19, 1990) was a German engineer, and Professor of Applied Mechanics at Stanford University. He is known as recipient of the 1970 Theodore von Karman Medal in Engineering Mechanics, and the 1970 Worcester Reed Warner Medal.

In 1934 Flügge published his most noted work Statik und Dynamik der Schalen in German, in 1960 translated into English, entitled Stresses in shells. In those days this work evolved into the international standard work on shell theory.

As Gere et al. (2004) put it, that work "served as the handbook for designers of concrete roofs, pressure vessels for storage and power generation, as well as aircraft, and served as the established point of departure for countless analytical and experimental research investigations. Even after numerous other texts on the subject have appeared, this book continues to occupy the position of primary reference."

== Biography ==
=== Youth, education and early career ===
Flügge was born in Greiz in the Free State of Thuringia, now Germany in 1904, where his father was a minister in the Protestant church. His younger brother was the theoretical physicist Siegfried Flügge (1912–1997). After completing the gymnasium in Dresden in 1921, he obtained his Dipl.-Ing. in civil engineering in 1925 at the Technische Hochschule Dresden, now Dresden University of Technology.

After his graduation, Flügge started his academic career at the Technische Hochschule Dresden as assistant to Kurt Beyer, a specialist on calculations on reinforced concrete. Flügge obtaining his Doctor of Engineering under Beyer in 1927. From 1927 to 1930, he worked in the construction company Dyckerhoff & Widmann in Wiesbaden and Leipzig, involved "in the development of new ideas of thin-shell construction in reinforced concrete for factories, train stations and observatories."

In 1930, Flügge obtained a post-doctoral position at the University of Göttingen, where in 1932 he submitted his habilitation thesis. In 1932 he was appointed privatdozent at the University of Göttingen, but experienced difficulties after being labelled "politically unreliable" according to Nazi policies. In 1938 he married Irmgard Lotz, a researcher at the Aerodynamics Research Institute, and they both continued their research and development at the German Aerospace Center (DVL) in Berlin during World War II, until the beginning of 1944.

=== Further career and acknowledgement ===
With the ongoing destruction of Berlin, the research facilities were moved in the spring of 1944 to Bad Saulgau in southern Germany, after the war in the French zone of occupation. In 1947, Flügge and his wife Irmgard Flügge-Lotz accepted positions at the newly-created Office National d'Etudes et de Recherches Aérospatiales (ONERA) in Paris.

With the assistance of Stephen Timoshenko, Flügge and his wife were both offered positions at Stanford University in 1949. Flügge became appointed Professor of Applied Mechanics, and served at Stanford University until his retirement.

In 1970, Flügge received both the Theodore von Karman Medal in Engineering Mechanics, and the Worcester Reed Warner Medal from the American Society of Mechanical Engineers (ASME).

== Selected publications ==
- Flügge, Wilhelm, Four-place tables of transcendental functions, 1954.
- Flügge, Wilhelm, Stresses in shells, 1960. Translation of Statik und Dynamik der Schalen, Springer Verlag, 1934.
- Flügge, Wilhelm, Statique et dynamique des coques, 1960.
- Flügge, Wilhelm (ed.), Handbook of engineering mechanics, McGraw Hill 1962
- Flügge, Wilhelm, Festigkeitslehre, Springer Verlag, 1967.
- Flügge, Wilhelm, Viscoelasticity, Blaisdell, 1967; 2nd edition, Springer Verlag 1975.
- Flügge, Wilhelm, Tensor analysis and continuum mechanics, 1972. ISBN 978-3-642-88384-2.
