= H. Norman Abramson =

American engineer (1926–2022)

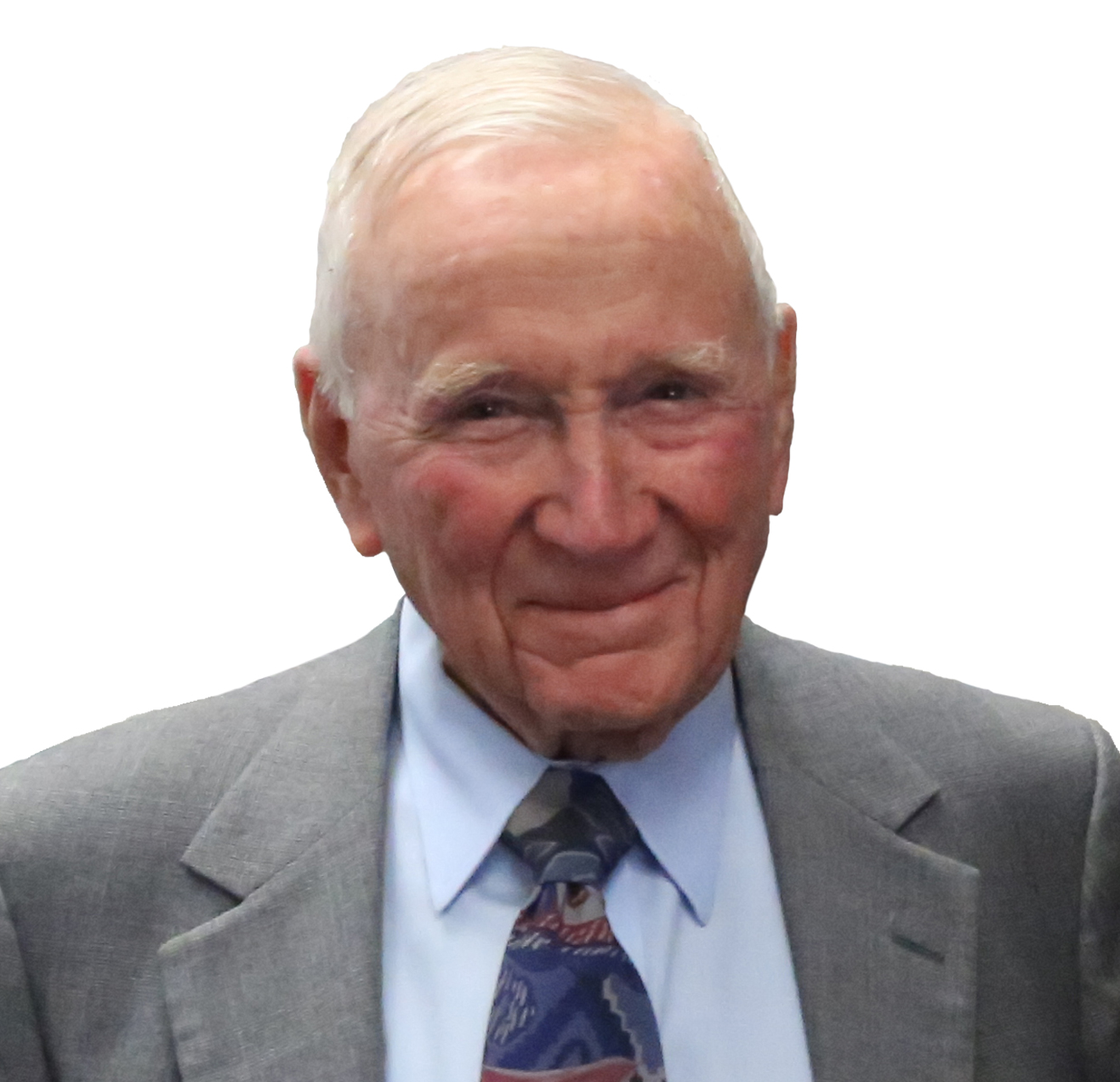
- Born: Hyman Norman Abramson; March 4, 1926; San Antonio, Texas, U.S.
- Died: December 19, 2022 (aged 96); San Antonio, Texas, U.S.
- Education: Stanford University
- Awards: ASME Medal (1999)
- Scientific career
- Fields: Theoretical and applied mechanics
- Workplaces: University of Texas at Austin

Notes
- Executive Vice President of the Southwest Research Institute

Hyman Norman Abramson (March 4, 1926 – December 19, 2022) was an American engineer and scientist. He was the Executive Vice President of the Southwest Research Institute at the University of Texas at Austin, and the manager and principal investigator in several NAE and NRC research projects.

Abramson was an internationally regarded expert in the field of theoretical mechanics and applied mechanics with expertise in fluid dynamics, specifically the "dynamics of contained liquids in astronautical, nuclear, and marine systems."

== Biography ==
=== Early life, education, and career ===
Abramson was born in San Antonio, Texas, on March 4, 1926. He completed his BSc and MSc in mechanical engineering at Stanford University in 1950 and 1951. He received his PhD in engineering mechanics from the University of Texas at Austin in 1956.

After his graduation in 1956 Abramson started his academic career as an associate professor of aeronautical engineering at Texas A&M University. Later he joined Southwest Research Institute where he eventually rose to Executive Vice President. Abramson was elected as a member into the National Academy of Engineering (NAE) in 1976 for his research in engineering dynamics, research management, and contributions to professional engineering society affairs.

== Other positions ==
In his early career, Abramson served in the position of Vice president and governor of the American Society of Mechanical Engineers (ASME), and he was Director of the American Institute of Aeronautics and Astronautics (AIAA).

In 1976 Abramson was elected member of the National Academy of Engineering (NAE), and from 1984 to 1990 he was Council member. He cooperated in several joint commissions by the National Academy of Engineering and the National Research Council (NRC), such as:

- In the Commission of Engineering and Technical Systems (CETS), he chaired the CETS Committee on R&D Strategies to Improve Surface Transportation Security
- In the Transportation Research Board (TBR) he joined the TRB Research and Technology Coordinating Committee, and the TRB Federal Transportation R&D Strategic Planning Process (Chair of the Committee for a Study of Public Sector Requirements for a Small Aircraft Transportation System (sponsored by NASA)

From 1986 to 1990 Abramson was member of the United States Air Force Scientific Advisory Board. Other activities have been

- Vice chair of the Committee for a Review of the National Transportation Science and Technology Strategy
- Committee on National Institute of Aerospace Proposal Reviews
- Committee on the Role of Naval Forces in the Global War on terror
- Member of the Oversight Committee for the Strategic Highway Research Program 2

=== Personal life and death ===
Abramson died in San Antonio, Texas, on December 19, 2022, at the age of 96.

== Awards and recognitions ==
Abramson was elected honorary member of the ASME in 1979, and obtained the ASME Honorary Member (Silver Medal). In 1988 the ASME also awarded him the Ted Belytschko Applied Mechanics Award, and in 1999 the ASME Medal (Gold Medal).

== Selected publications ==
- Abramson, H. Norman. The dynamic behavior of liquids in moving containers, with applications to space vehicle technology. (1966).
- Abramson, H. Norman. An introduction to the dynamics of airplanes. Dover Publications, 1971.
- Schmoch, U., Reid, P. P., Encarnacao, J., & Abramson, H. N. (Eds.). Technology transfer systems in the United States and Germany: Lessons and perspectives. National Academies Press, 1997.

Articles, a selection.

- Dodge, Franklin T., Daniel D. Kana, and H. Norman Abramson. "Liquid surface oscillations in longitudinally excited rigid cylindrical containers." AIAA J 3.4 (1965): 685–695.
- Abramson, H. Norman, Wen-Hwa Chu, and Daniel D. Kana. "Some studies of nonlinear lateral sloshing in rigid containers." Journal of Applied Mechanics 33.4 (1966): 777-784.
- Daniel F. Morgan and H. Norman Abramson. "Improving Surface Transportation Security Through Research and Development," TR News 211, November–December 2000
