= Irmgard Flügge-Lotz =

German-American mathematician and aerospace engineer

- Born: 16 July 1903; Hamelin, Germany
- Died: 22 May 1974 (aged 70); Palo Alto, California
- Citizenship: Germany, United States
- Education: Leibniz University Hannover
- Known for: Theory of discontinuous automatic control Bang-bang control Lotz method
- Awards: Fellow, American Institute of Aeronautics and Astronautics (1970); Society of Women Engineers Achievement Award (1970) von Kármán Lecture (1971)
- Scientific career
- Fields: Fluid dynamics Automatic control
- Workplaces: Aerodynamische Versuchsanstalt; Deutsche Versuchsanstalt für Luftfahrt; ONERA; Stanford University
- Thesis: Mathemathische Theorien im Bereich der Wärmeleitung kreisförmiger Zylinder (1929)

Irmgard Flügge-Lotz, née Lotz (16 July 1903 – 22 May 1974) was a German-American mathematician and aerospace engineer. She was a pioneer in the development of the theory of discontinuous automatic control, which has found wide application in hysteresis control systems; such applications include guidance systems, electronics, fire-control systems, and temperature regulation.

== Early life and education ==
Lotz was born in Hamelin, Germany on 16 July 1903. She was encouraged at an early age to pursue technical subjects by her mother, whose family had been involved in construction for several generations. She often visited construction sites with her uncle and attended half-price matinee shows for technical films. After her father, Osark, a travelling journalist, was drafted for military service in World War I, the young Irmgard helped the family by becoming a math tutor while studying at a girls' Gymnasium in Hanover. Several years later, when Osark returned to Hanover he was in poor health and Irmgard continued to work to bring in extra money for the family. She graduated from the Gymnasium in 1923 and entered the Leibniz University Hannover to study mathematics and engineering. Later in life, she explained why she decided to study engineering:

I wanted a life which would never be boring. That meant a life in which always new things would occur ... I wanted a career in which I would always be happy even if I were to remain unmarried.

In college she studied applied mathematics and fluid dynamics and was often the only woman in her classes. In 1927, she received her Diplom-Ingenieur and remained in Hanover for her doctorate. In 1929 she earned her doctorate in engineering, publishing her thesis on the mathematical theory of circular cylinders and heat conduction.

== Early career ==
Lotz went to work for the Aerodynamische Versuchsanstalt (AVA) in Göttingen, one of the most prominent aeronautical research institutions in Europe. She joined as a junior research engineer and worked closely with Ludwig Prandtl and Albert Betz, two of the leading German aerodynamicists of the time. Prior to her arrival at the AVA, Prandtl had been unsuccessfully working on solving a differential equation for his lifting-line theory for the spanwise lift distribution of an airplane wing. Lotz was able to overcome his difficulties and solve the equation, and additionally developed a relatively simple method for practical use. She published what is now known as the "Lotz method" in 1931 for calculating the lift on a three-dimensional wing, and it became a standard technique used internationally. Following this achievement, she was promoted to team leader and built the theoretical department at the AVA by establishing her own research program and assisting other research groups.

In 1932, she met Wilhelm Flügge, who was a civil engineer and privatdozent at the University of Göttingen. As they prepared to marry, Lotz's career progressed well and by the time they married in 1938 she had been appointed Head of the Department of Theoretical Aerodynamics. However, Flügge was branded "politically unreliable" and denied promotion at Göttingen for his anti-Nazi views. Flügge later recalled that while he was denied because of his political views, Lotz was "blocked from any possibility of ever getting into a university career, just because of being a woman". The escalation and increasing influence of Nazi policies on academia led to their departure from the AVA and they moved to the Deutsche Versuchsanstalt für Luftfahrt (DVL) in Berlin where Flügge-Lotz (her married name) was a consultant in aerodynamics and flight dynamics and Flügge was appointed Chief of Structures Research. Although banned from academic positions due to Nazi policies, they were permitted to continue their research activities under the protection of Hermann Göring, who was more concerned with technical expertise than ideological purity.

At DVL Flügge-Lotz began her career in automatic control theory and pioneered the theory of discontinuous control systems. These control systems, also known as "on-off" and "bang-bang" systems, have only two or three input settings and are simple to manufacture and very reliable in practical application. She was mainly interested in the implications these systems had for the development of simple automatic flight control equipment. However, the theory describing their performance needed to be developed before they could be reliably implemented in physical systems. Flügge-Lotz began developing the theory while at DVL, but wartime priorities limited her time for heavily theoretical projects so she focused mainly on aerodynamics during this time.

=== Move to France ===
As World War II progressed, Berlin was increasingly subject to bombing raids by the Allies. In the spring of 1944, the destruction of Berlin had progressed so far that Flügge-Lotz and Flügge moved with their departments to the small town Saulgau in the hills of southern Germany. After the end of the war, Saulgau was in the French zone of Allied-occupied Germany. The French relaunched their aeronautical research activity and were eager to hire German scientists, so in 1947 Flügge-Lotz and Flügge moved with many of their colleagues to Paris to join the Office National d'Etudes et de Recherches Aerospatiales (ONERA). Flügge-Lotz served as Chief of a research group in aerodynamics until 1948 and published papers in both automatic control theory and aerodynamics, in which she discussed the problems arising from the increased speed of aircraft.

== Career at Stanford University ==
Although Flügge-Lotz and her husband were happy living in Paris, the positions they held there provided limited opportunity for advancement. They wrote to Stephen Timoshenko at Stanford University casually asking about working in the United States and in 1948, and both received offers to teach there. However, at the time Stanford held a university policy that husband and wife could not hold professional rank in the same department, and despite Flügge-Lotz's reputation in research, she had to accept the relatively minor position of "lecturer" as her husband became professor.

Despite lacking of a professorial title, she immediately began accepting students for PhD dissertation research in aerodynamic theory, and in the spring of 1949, taught her first Stanford course in boundary layer theory. At Stanford, Flügge-Lotz conducted research in numerical methods to solve boundary layer problems in fluid dynamics, making pioneering contributions with finite difference methods and the use of computers. In 1951 she set up a weekly fluid mechanics seminar for first-year graduate students to provide a forum for discussing the latest ideas and developments.

=== Discontinuous automatic control theory ===
In addition to fluid mechanics, Flügge-Lotz returned to her work on automatic control theory initially started at DVL. She developed new courses and began advising students preparing their theses on the subject. She published the first textbook on discontinuous automatic control in 1953. A reviewer of her textbook wrote that:

In the simplest case a discontinuous automatic control system is a control system in which the correcting force is a positive constant A, or the corresponding negative constant -A, depending upon whether the sign of the error is positive or negative. Because of their simplicity, such systems are widely used, and the literature contains discussions of many particular systems of this kind. The present book represents the first attempt to treat such systems in a comprehensive and general way. ... the book constitutes a highly valuable contribution to the subject of automatic control, and it will, undoubtedly, lead to many further advances in the field.

Since automatic control devices often found application in electronics, she also began collaborating with faculty and students in the Department of Electrical Engineering. Over time, her primary research efforts went increasingly into control theory, and in 1968, the year of her retirement, she published her second book, Discontinuous and Optimal Control.

=== Tenure controversy ===
By the mid-1950s, it became evident that Flügge-Lotz was performing all the duties of a full Professor but without official recognition. In fact, it was hard for students to understand why she was a Lecturer rather than a professor, or even what the difference meant. The disparity of her status as a Lecturer became more apparent when she was the only female delegate from the United States at the first Congress of the International Federation of Automatic Control in Moscow. To address the issue before school opened for the fall quarter, she was appointed a full Professor in both Engineering Mechanics and in Aeronautics and Astronautics in 1961.

== Awards and organizations ==
During her lifetime, Flügge-Lotz received many honors for her work. In 1970, she was elected a Fellow (first woman) of the American Institute of Aeronautics and Astronautics (AIAA) and chosen to give the von Kármán lecture to the AIAA in 1971. She received the Achievement Award from the Society of Women Engineers in 1970 “For her significant contributions to the field of fluid mechanics, in particular wing theory and boundary layer theory. Notably: Computation of wing-life distributions.” She received an honorary doctorate from the University of Maryland in 1973. The citation for her honorary degree stated:

Professor Flügge-Lotz has acted in a central role in the development of the aircraft industry in the Western world. Her contributions have spanned a lifetime during which she demonstrate, in a field dominated by men, the value and quality of a woman's intuitive approach in searching for and discovering solutions to complex engineering problems. Her work manifested unusual personal dedication and native intelligence.

She was a senior member of the Institute of Electrical and Electronics Engineers (IEEE), a member of Sigma Xi, and a member of the advisory boards of several scientific journals.

In honor of her contributions, the “Wilhelm Flügge and Irmgard Flügge-Lotz Memorial Award" was established by the Applied Mechanics Division at Stanford University for outstanding graduate students.

== Legacy ==
Flügge-Lotz became the first female engineering professor at Stanford University in 1960. Flügge-Lotz retired in 1968 at age 65, but continued to conduct research on satellite control systems, heat transfer, and high-speed vehicle drag.

Flügge-Lotz acted in a central role in the development of the aircraft industry in the Western world. Her contributions spanned a lifetime during which she demonstrated, in a field dominated by men, the value and quality of a woman's intuitive approach in searching for and discovering solutions to complex engineering problems. Her work manifested unusual personal dedication and native intelligence.

She was the first woman elected a Fellow of the AIAA and the first woman chosen to give the Kármán lecture to the AIAA.

== Death ==
Flügge-Lotz's health deteriorated after her retirement and she suffered increasingly severe pain from arthritis that spread over her body. On May 22, 1974, Flügge-Lotz died in Stanford Hospital after a long illness.

== Publications ==
- Die Erwärmung des Stempels beim Stauchvorgang, Dissertation TH Hannover 1929
- Discontinuous Automatic Control, Princeton University Press 1953
- Discontinuous and Optimal Control, McGraw Hill 1968

== Bibliography ==
- J. R. Spreiter & W. Flügge, Irmgard Flügge-Lotz in Louise S. Grinstein; Paul J. Campbell, eds. (1987). Women of Mathematics: A Bio-Bibliographic Sourcebook. Greenwood Press, New York. ISBN 978-0-313-24849-8. p. 33-40
- Craig, Cecilia (2025). Chapter 24 "Irmgard Flügge-Lotz. In Craig, Cecilia; Teig, Holly; Kimberling, Debra; Williams, Janet; Tietjen, Jill; Johnson, Vicki (eds.). Women Engineering Legends 1952-1976: Society of Women Engineers Achievement Award Recipients. Springer Cham. ISBN 978-3-032-00223-5

== See also ==
- German inventors and discoverers
- List of people in systems and control
