= Drucker stability =

Drucker stability (also called the Drucker stability postulates) refers to a set of mathematical criteria that restrict the possible nonlinear stress-strain relations that can be satisfied by a solid material. The postulates are named after Daniel C. Drucker. A material that does not satisfy these criteria is often found to be unstable in the sense that application of a load to a material point can lead to arbitrary deformations at that material point unless an additional length or time scale is specified in the constitutive relations.

The Drucker stability postulates are often invoked in nonlinear finite element analysis. Materials that satisfy these criteria are generally well-suited for numerical analysis, while materials that fail to satisfy this criterion are likely to present difficulties (i.e. non-uniqueness or singularity) during the solution process.

== Drucker's first stability criterion ==
Drucker's first stability criterion (first proposed by Rodney Hill and also called Hill's stability criterion) is a strong condition on the incremental internal energy of a material which states that the incremental internal energy can only increase. The criterion may be written as follows:

$$\text{d}\boldsymbol{\sigma}:\text{d}\boldsymbol{\varepsilon} \ge 0$$,

where dσ is the stress increment tensor associated with the strain increment tensor dε through the constitutive relation.

== Drucker's stability postulate ==
Drucker's postulate is applicable to elastic-plastic materials and states that in a cycle of plastic deformation the second degree plastic work is always positive. This postulate can be expressed in incremental form as

$$\text{d}\boldsymbol{\sigma}:\text{d}\boldsymbol{\varepsilon}_p \ge 0$$,

where dε_{p} is the incremental plastic strain tensor.
