= Julia R. Greer =

American materials scientist

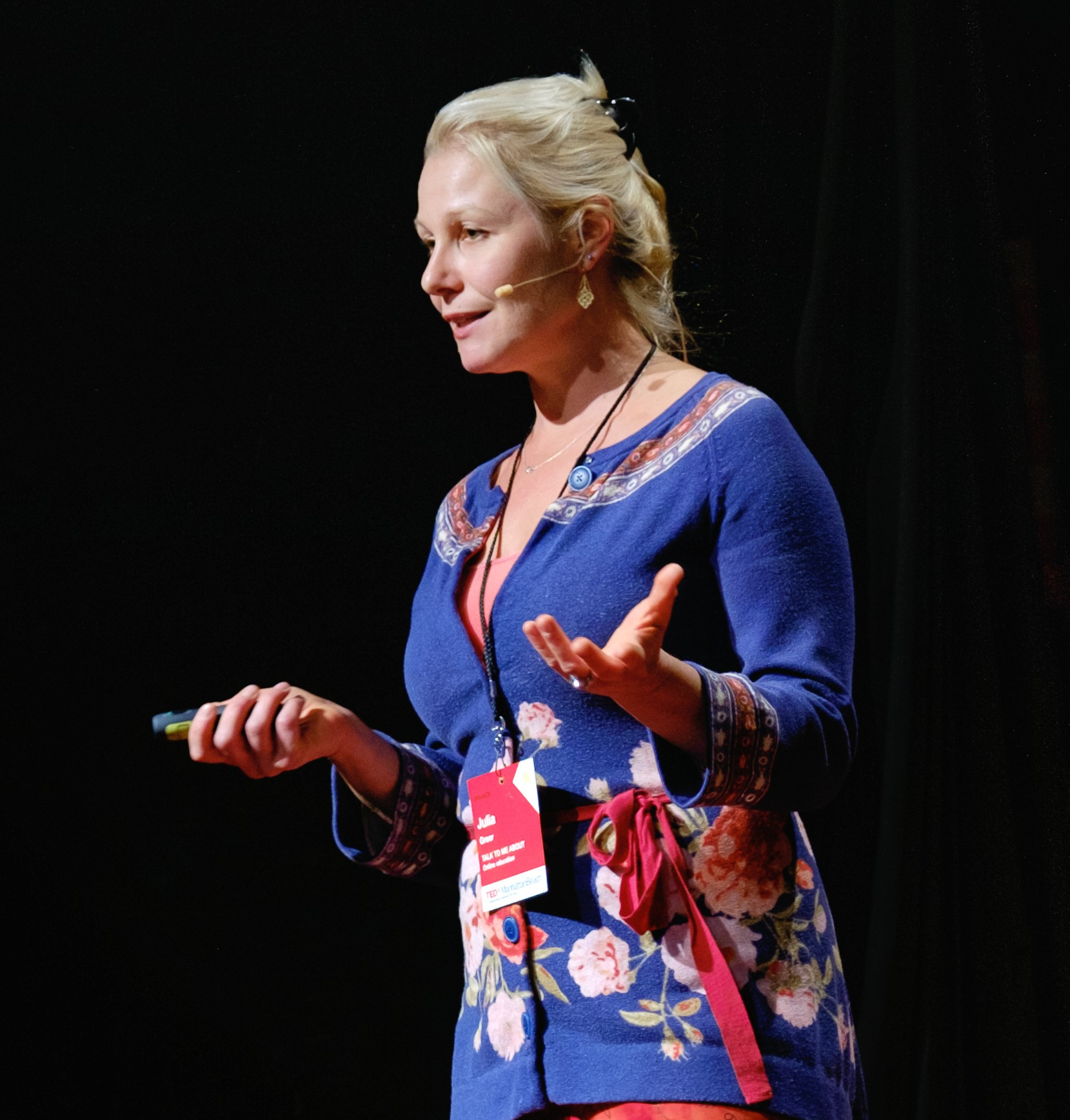
- Born: Moscow, Russia
- Education: MIT (B.S.); Stanford University (M.S., Ph.D.)
- Scientific career
- Fields: Materials Science; Nanomaterials; Mechanical Engineering
- Workplaces: California Institute of Technology

Julia Rosolovsky Greer is a materials scientist and is the Ruben F. and Donna Mettler Professor of Materials Science, Mechanics and Medical Engineering at the California Institute of Technology (Caltech). As of 2019, Greer is also the director of the Kavli Nanoscience Institute at Caltech.

As a pioneer in the field of nanomechanics and architected materials, Greer has earned many awards, such as being named a CNN 2020 Visionary, for her work investigating how materials behave at the nano-scale. Greer has been a professor at Caltech since 2007, and is also an associate editor at both Extreme Mechanics Letters and Nano Letters.

== Early life and education ==
Greer was born in Moscow, Russia, and moved to the U.S. with her parents at the age of 16. Greer attended the Massachusetts Institute of Technology (MIT) for college, where she received a Bachelors of Science in Chemical Engineering and a minor in Advanced Music Performance in 1997. Greer then went on to receive graduate degrees in Materials Science and Engineering; she earned a Masters of Science (M.S.) in 2000 and Doctor of Philosophy (Ph.D.) in 2005, both from Stanford University. Between receiving her M.S. and Ph.D., Greer worked at Intel from 2000 to 2003. For her dissertation, titled "Size dependence of strength of gold at the micron scale in the absence of strain gradients," Greer worked with materials scientist William D. Nix studying the mechanical properties of nanopillars. After her PhD, Greer pursued postdoctoral studies at the Palo Alto Research Center (PARC) from 2005 to 2007.

== Research and career ==
Greer joined the Materials Science Department at Caltech in 2007 as an assistant professor; she received tenure and was promoted to full professor in 2013. Her research focuses on the application of nanotechnology in biomedical materials, multi-functional devices, energy storage, and material synthesis.

Greer has received much recognition and several career awards for her work. Her lab's early work has resulted in a new direction in nanomechanics. Her lab is now harnessing strategies in nanofabrication for applications ranging from improving lithium-ion batteries to developing biomedical devices.

== Awards and recognition ==
- 2008 - Technology Review's Top Young Innovators Under 35
- 2010 - Nominee for World Technology Network’s World Technology Award in Materials
- 2011 - Sia Nemat-Nasser Early Career Award
- 2011 - DOE Early Career Research Program Award
- 2011 - The Materials, Metals, and Minerals Society (TMS) Young Leader Professional Development Award
- 2012 - Popular Mechanics Breakthrough Award
- 2012 - NASA (inaugural) Early Career Faculty Award
- 2012 - Invitee to World Economic Forum (WEF) in Davos
- 2013 - Society of Engineering Science (SES) Young Investigator Medal
- 2013 - The Materials, Metals, and Minerals Society (TMS) Early Career Faculty Award
- 2013 - Discussion Leader at and invitee to World Economic Forum (WEF) meeting in Davos
- 2013 - Speaker at the 2013 China-America Frontiers of Engineering Symposium
- 2013 - American Chemical Society (ACS) Nano Letters Young Investigator Award and Lectureship
- 2014 - Speaker at Google’s Solve for X Conference
- 2014 - Young Global Leader by the World Economic Forum (WEF)
- 2014 - One of “100 Most Creative People” by Fast Company Magazine
- 2014 - Robert W. Cahn “Best Paper Prize” by Journal of Materials Science (shared with L. Meza)
- 2014 - Kavli Foundation Early Career Lectureship in Materials Science Recipients by the Materials Research Society (MRS)
- 2015 - Speaker at the 2015 U.S. Frontiers of Engineering Symposium
- 2015 - Midwest Mechanics Tour Lecturer
- 2015 - Gilbreth Lecturer for the National Academy of Engineering
- 2015 - Technology Review’s Top-10 Emerging Technologies
- 2016 - CNN's 2020 Visionary
- 2016 - U.S. Department of Defense's (DOD) National Security Science and Engineering Faculty Fellow
- 2016 - U.S. Department of Defense's (DOD) Vannevar Bush Faculty Fellow
- 2018 - Featured in Caltech's Breakthrough Campaign
- 2019 - AAAFM Heeger Award

== Personal life ==
In addition to being a scientist, Greer is also an accomplished pianist. She took piano lessons starting at age 5 and has studied music at several institutions, including Moscow's Gnessin School of Music, the Eastman School of Music, MIT, the San Francisco Conservatory of Music, and Stanford University.

Greer also loves rollerblading. She will occasionally rollerblade to and from work and has even participated in a rollerblading marathon.

== External media and links ==
- Lecture given at the 2014 MRS Fall Meeting for receiving the Kavli Early Career Award in Nanoscience: "Three Dimensional Architected Nanostructured Meta-Materials"
- Talk given at TEDxCERN in 2014: "The surprising strengths of materials in the nanoworld"
- Talk given at TEDxManhattanBeach in 2016: "Nanotechnology: When Less is More"
- STEM Gems feature: "Bigger Doesn’t Always Mean Stronger: Julia Greer is Changing the Idea of How Materials Are Made"
- Publications by Julia R. Greer at ResearchGate
- Julia R. Greer publications indexed by Google Scholar
- Lab website
