= Masanobu Shinozuka =

- Born: December 23, 1930; Tokyo, Japan
- Died: November 5, 2018 (aged 87); California
- Education: Columbia University
- Awards: National Academy of Engineering; Theodore von Karman Medal (1994)
- Scientific career
- Fields: Civil Engineering
- Workplaces: Columbia University
- Doctoral advisor: Alfred Freudenthal

Masanobu Shinozuka (December 23, 1930 – November 5, 2018) was a Japanese applied mechanics expert in earthquake and structural engineering. Shinozuka's research focuses on field theory and risk assessment methodology in civil engineering. His works have been applied numerously in earthquake engineering in buildings, bridges, lifeline and environmental systems.

== Early life and career ==
Masanobu Shinozuka was born in Tokyo, Japan on December 23, 1930. He earned his B.S. in civil engineering in 1953 and M.S. in 1955 from Kyoto University. Shinozuka later came to the United States and received his Ph.D. in civil engineering under the supervision of Alfred Freudenthal from Columbia University in New York City. From 1958 to 1988, Shinozuka taught in the civil engineering department of Columbia University. Later, he joined the faculty of Princeton University until 1995, and then became professor of civil engineering and Fred Champion Chair of Civil Engineering at the University of Southern California. At USC, he also served as director of the International Institute of Innovative Risk Reduction Research on Civil Infrastructure Systems. From 2001 to 2013, he was a Distinguished Professor of Civil and Environmental Engineering at University of California, Irvine. He was awarded the title of Distinguished Professor by the university's Henry Samueli School of Engineering and the Academic Senate. He returned to Columbia as Professor of Civil Engineering in 2013 and died on November 5, 2018.

== Honors ==
Masanobu Shinozuka was the recipient of numerous honors and awards. In 2004, he was awarded the Egleston Award for Distinguished Engineering Achievement. In 1994, he received the prestigious Theodore von Karman Medal from the American Society of Civil Engineers. In 1978, Shinozuka was elected to the National Academy of Engineering. He was also a fellow in the American Society of Mechanical Engineering, an elected foreign member of the Russian Academy of Natural Sciences and an honorary member of the American Society of Civil Engineering.
