= Ascher H. Shapiro =

American engineering professor (1916–2004)

- Ascher H. Shapiro, 1971
- Born: Ascher Herman Shapiro; May 20, 1916; Brooklyn, New York, U.S.
- Died: November 26, 2004 (aged 88); Jamaica Plain, Boston, Massachusetts, U.S.
- Education: Massachusetts Institute of Technology (BS, DSc)
- Known for: Compressible flow and biomechanics
- Awards: Drucker Medal (1999)
- Scientific career
- Fields: Mechanical Engineering; Biomedical Engineering
- Workplaces: Massachusetts Institute of Technology
- Doctoral advisor: Joseph H. Keenan
- Doctoral students: Thomas A. McMahon

Ascher Herman Shapiro (May 20, 1916 – November 26, 2004) was a professor of Mechanical Engineering at MIT. He grew up in New York City.

== Early life and education ==
Shapiro was born and raised in Brooklyn, New York, to Jewish Lithuanian immigrant parents. He earned his B.S. in 1938 and an D.Sc. in 1946 in the field of mechanical engineering at the Massachusetts Institute of Technology (MIT).

== Career ==
After starting at MIT as a laboratory assistant in mechanical engineering, Shapiro was eventually appointed assistant professor at MIT in 1943 where he taught fluid mechanics. A prolific author of texts in his field, his two-volume treatise, The Dynamics and Thermodynamics of Compressible Fluid Flow, published in 1953 and 1954, is considered a classic. His 1961 book Shape and Flow: The Fluid Dynamics of Drag explained boundary layer phenomena and drag in simple, non-mathematical terms. He also founded the National Council for Fluid Mechanics Films (NCFMF), in cooperation with the Educational Development Center. From there, Shapiro was appointed Chair of the Institute's Faculty in 1964-1965 and head of the Department of Mechanical Engineering from 1965 to 1974.

In 1962 he demonstrated the Coriolis effect in a bathtub-sized water tank placed in MIT (latitude 42° N). The experiment required extreme precision, since the acceleration due to Coriolis effect is only $3\times 10^{-7}$ that of gravity. The tank was filled, kept static for 24 hours, then drained. The vortex was measured by a cross made of two slivers of wood floating above the draining hole. It takes 20 minutes to drain, and the cross starts turning only after around 15 minutes. At the end it is turning at 1 rotation every 3 to 4 seconds.

Shapiro was elected to American Academy of Arts and Sciences in 1952, the National Academy of Sciences in 1967, and National Academy of Engineering in 1974. He was awarded the Benjamin Garver Lamme Award by the American Society of Engineering Education in 1977. He was awarded the Fluids Engineering Award in 1977 and the Drucker Medal in 1999 by the American Society of Mechanical Engineers. He was awarded honorary Doctor of Science in 1978 by the University of Salford and in 1985 by the Technion.

== Books ==
- Shapiro, Ascher H., Dynamics and Thermodynamics of Compressible Fluid Flow, Krieger Pub. Co; Reprint ed., with corrections (June 1983), ISBN 0-89874-566-7.
- Shapiro, Ascher H., Shape and flow: The fluid dynamics of drag, Anchor Books, 1961.
