= Instrument maker =

Instrument maker can refer to:

- A maker of scientific instruments
- A maker of musical instruments
  - A luthier is a maker of stringed instruments
