= Theodore Y. Wu =

American engineer (1924–2023)

Theodore Yao-tsu Wu
- 吴耀祖
- Born: March 20, 1924; Changzhou, China
- Died: December 16, 2023 (aged 99)
- Education: Chiao Tung University; Iowa State University; California Institute of Technology
- Awards: Georg Weinblum Memorial Lectureship (1983-1984); Fluid Dynamics Prize (APS) (1993); Theodore von Karman Medal (2004)
- Scientific career
- Fields: Fluid dynamics
- Workplaces: California Institute of Technology
- Doctoral advisor: Paco Lagerstrom

Theodore Yaotsu Wu (Chinese: 吴耀祖; pinyin: Wú Yàozǔ; March 20, 1924 – December 16, 2023) was a Chinese-born American engineer. He was a professor of Engineering Science at the California Institute of Technology. His research contribution included compressible fluid flow, free-streamline theory of cavities, jets and wakes, water waves and free-surface flows, mechanics of fish swimming and bird/insect flight, wind and ocean-current energy, and internal waves in the ocean.

== Early life ==
Wu came from a Chinese scholar family. His father had a degree in economics and finance, his mother graduated from high school and majored in literature, while his grandfather was a Chinese physician.

During the Japanese invasion, the Japanese airplanes flying overhead eventually inspired him to enter aeronautics in the university.

== Education and career ==
Wu received his BSc in 1946 from National Chiao Tung University in Shanghai (now Shanghai Jiao Tong University), and spent one year teaching upon graduation. In January 1948 he arrived in the U.S. and enrolled at Iowa State University and graduated with an MS in December the same year. After Iowa State, Wu went to Caltech, where he shared an office with Julian Cole. Wu was involved in the research group headed by Paco Lagerstrom, where they developed further the asymptotic perturbation method pioneered by Ludwig Prandtl.

Wu received his PhD in (1952), subsequently worked as a research fellow at Caltech for three years, and developed interest in water waves and hydrodynamics, due to inspiration from then Qian Xuesen and von Karman. After three years Wu became an assistant professor of applied mechanics (1955) at Caltech. In 1960, under the influence of G. I. Taylor and James Lighthill, Wu started to work on fish locomotion and bird flight (biofluiddynamics). During his time at Caltech he also contributed to the field of naval architecture and was involved in the International Towing Tank Conferences. Wu was elected a member of the United States National Academy of Engineering in 1982.

== Later life and death ==
Wu retired in 1996, but remained very active after his retirement. He died on December 16, 2023, at the age of 99.

== Selected publications ==
- Wu, T. Y. T. (1961), "Swimming of a waving plate", Journal of Fluid Mechanics, 10 (3): 321–344, Bibcode:1961JFM....10..321W, doi:10.1017/S0022112061000949, S2CID 17743120
- Wu, Theodore Yaotsu (2001), "A unified theory for modeling water waves", Advances in Applied Mechanics, vol. 37, pp. 1–88, doi:10.1016/S0065-2156(00)80004-6, ISBN 9780120020379
