= Lallit Anand =

American academic

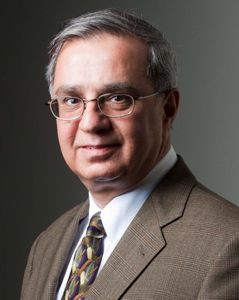

Academic background
- Education: IIT Kharagpur; Brown University

Academic work
- Institutions: MIT

Lallit Anand is the Warren and Towneley Rohsenow Professor of Mechanical Engineering at the Massachusetts Institute of Technology (MIT). His research focuses on solid mechanics and large deformation plasticity theory. He has received numerous awards and accolades for his significant contributions to the field of applied mechanics and mechanical engineering.

== Biography ==
Lallit Anand was born in Delhi, India on June 29, 1948. He completed his undergraduate studies in mechanical engineering at the Indian Institute of Technology Kharagpur in 1970. He went on to earn his doctorate degree from Brown University in 1975. That year he started work as a research scientist at the United States Steel Corporation's Mechanical Sciences Division of the Fundamental Research Laboratory, and was later promoted to senior research scientist. He served in that position until 1981. He joined the faculty in the department of mechanical engineering at the Massachusetts Institute of Technology (MIT) in 1982, and has worked there for over thirty six years. From 2008 to 2013, he served as the head of the Area for Mechanics. He currently holds the title of Warren and Towneley Rohsenow Professor of Mechanical Engineering. Professor Anand has mentored over 25 Ph.D. students during his years as an educator at Massachusetts Institute of Technology. He was elected as a member to the National Academy of Engineering in 2018 for contributions to the development of plasticity for engineering technology: theory, experiment, and computation.

In addition to his work at the university, he has served as the program director for the Mechanics of Materials Program , as well as the Manufacturing Processes Program in the Engineering Directorate of the National Science Foundation from 1989 to 1991. Further, from 1994 to 1999 he was a member of the Executive Committee of the Applied Mechanics Division of the American Society of Mechanical Engineers, and served as the chair of the Applied Mechanics Division in 1999.

== Research ==
In his research, Anand focuses on solid mechanics, continuum mechanics, and plasticity. Many of the theories that he has developed in his research have been used in finite-element-based computer programs and are widely implemented for structural and materials-processing design in engineering.

Anand has published over 130 peer-reviewed research papers in academic journals. He has also coauthored a textbook with Morton Gurtin and Eliot Fried, titled The Mechanics and Thermodynamics of Continua published by Cambridge University Press in 2010, which is frequently used in engineering courses focusing on continuum mechanics.

== Awards and honors ==
- 1992: Eric Reissner Medal, 1992 from the International Society for Computational Engineering & Sciences.
- 2003: Fellow of the American Society of Mechanical Engineers , 2003.
- 2007: Khan International Plasticity Medal, 2007 from the International Journal of Plasticity for outstanding life-long contributions to the field of Plasticity.
- 2011: Distinguished Alumnus Award from the Indian Institute of Technology Kharagpur.
- 2014: Symposium Honoring Professor Lallit Anand on the Occasion of his 65th Birthday at the 17th U. S. National Congress on Theoretical and Applied Mechanics at Michigan State University.
- 2014: Daniel C. Drucker Medal from the ASME.
- 2017: J. P. Den Hartog Distinguished Educator Award for excellence in teaching Mechanical Engineering at Massachusetts Institute of Technology.
- 2018: William Prager Medal from the Society of Engineering Science, for outstanding research contributions in Solid Mechanics.
- 2018: Brown Engineering Alumni Medal from Brown University for his distinguished career and contributions to the field of engineering research.
- 2018: Elected to the National Academy of Engineering.
