= Ahmed Cemal Eringen =

Turkish engineering scientist (1921–2009)

Ahmet Cemal Eringen
- Born: 15 February 1921; Kayseri, Turkey
- Died: 7 December 2009 (aged 88)
- Education: Istanbul Technical University (BS); Polytechnic Institute of Brooklyn (PhD)
- Known for: Dean of the School of Engineering and Applied Science at Princeton University; Non-local elasticity theory
- Awards: Eringen Medal (1977)
- Scientific career
- Fields: Applied mechanics
- Workplaces: Illinois Institute of Technology; Purdue University; Princeton University
- Thesis: Solution of the Two-dimensional Mixed-mixed Boundary Value Problem of Elasticity For Rectangular, Orthotropic Media And Application To The Buckling Of Sandwich Beams
- Doctoral advisor: Nicholas John Hoff

Ahmet Cemal Eringen (February 15, 1921 – December 7, 2009) was a Turkish engineering scientist. He was a professor at Princeton University and the founder of the Society of Engineering Science. The Eringen Medal is named in his honor.

== Education ==
Eringen was born in Kayseri, Turkey and studied at the Istanbul Technical University and graduated with a diploma degree in 1943 and then worked for the Turkish Aircraft Co. until 1944. In 1944–1945, he was a trainee at the Glenn L. Martin Company and in 1945 was group leader at the Turkish Air League Company. He continued his studies at the Polytechnic Institute of Brooklyn in New York City where he received his doctorate in applied mechanics in 1948 under the supervision of Nicholas J. Hoff.

== Academic life ==
He became assistant professor at the Illinois Institute of Technology in 1948, associate professor in 1953 and professor in 1955 at Purdue University. He was appointed as professor of aerospace and mechanical engineering at Princeton University in 1966. He became professor of continuum mechanics in the departments of civil and geological engineering and the program in applied and computational mathematics at Princeton University. He retired in 1991 as the dean of the School of Engineering and Applied Science at Princeton University and died in 2009.

== Research areas ==
His work deals with continuum mechanics, electrodynamics of continua and material theories.

== Awards ==
In 1981 he received an honorary doctorate from the University of Glasgow (D.Sc.). In 1973, he received the Distinguished Service Award and the 1976 as named in his honor A. C. Eringen Medal of the Society of Engineering Science, whose president he was in 1963 to 1973.

== Personal life ==
Eringen had been married since 1949 and had four children.

== Publications ==
- Nonlocal Continuum Field Theories, Springer Verlag, 2002
- Microcontinuum Field Theories, volume 1, Springer Verlag, 1999
- Microcontinuum Field Theories II Fluent Media 1st Edition, Springer 2001
- with Erhan Kıral: Constitutive Equations of Nonlinear Electromagnetic-Elastic Crystals, Springer Verlag, 1990
- with Gérard A. Maugin: Electrodynamics of Continua, 2 volumes, Springer Verlag, 1989
- Continuum Physics (Editor): Continuum Physics, 4 volumes, Academic Press, 1974-1976
- with Erdoğan S. Suhubi: Elastodynamics, volume 1, Academic Press, 1974-1975
- with Erdoğan S. Suhubi: Elastodynamics: Linear Theory volume 2, Academic Press, 1974-1975
- Foundations of Micropolar Thermoelasticity: Course held at the Department for Mechanics of Deformable Bodies July 1970 (CISM International Centre for Mechanical Sciences) 1970th Edition
- Theory of Micropolar Elasticity in Microcontinuum Field Theories, Springer Verlag, 1970
- Mechanics of Continua, Wiley, 1967
- Nonlinear Theory of Continuous Media, McGraw Hill, 1962
- with Roy C. Dixon: A dynamical theory of polar elastic dielectrics, 1964
