= James W. Dally =

American engineering scientist

- Born: August 2, 1929
- Education: Illinois Institute of Technology (PhD); Carnegie Mellon University (MS); Carnegie Mellon University (BS)
- Scientific career
- Fields: Mechanics
- Workplaces: University of Maryland, College Park

James William Dally is an American engineer and professor.

== Education ==
Dally earned a BS in mechanical engineering in 1951 and MS in mechanical engineering from 1953 from the Carnegie Institute of Technology. He earned a PhD in mechanics from Illinois Institute of Technology in 1958 with August J. Durelli.

== Research and career ==
After completing his PhD, Dally stayed in Chicago as the assistant director research Armour Research Foundation from 1961 to 1964 with Max M. Frocht and then professor at Illinois Institute of Technology from 1964 to 1971. He moved to the University of Maryland, College Park as a professor and department chair from 1971 to 1979. After a move to the University Rhode Island as the Dean of the College Engineering from 1979 to 1982 and IBM from 1982 to 1984, he returned to University Maryland, College Park, as a professor mechanical engineering until his retirement in 1997 and continues on as emeritus. Throughout his career he made seminal contributions in the field of mechanics studying stress wave propagation and dynamic fracture mechanics. He was active in the Society for Experimental Stress Analysis and later renamed Society for Experimental Mechanics, serving as president from 1970 to 1971. He contributed to seminal books in the fields of mechanics, including Experimental Stress Analysis with William F. Riley. Dally was named an Honorary Member of the Society for Experimental Mechanics in 1983. He was named a member of the National Academy of Engineering in 1984. In 2016, the Society for Experimental Mechanics introduced the J.W. Dally Young Investigator award in his honor. The University of Maryland, College Park also has a James W. Dally Endowed Scholarship in his name.

== Awards and recognition ==
- Society for Experimental Mechanics Frocht (1976)
- Society for Experimental Mechanics Fellow (1978)
- American Society of Mechanical Engineers Fellow (1978)
- SEM Murray Lecture and Award (1979)
- Society for Experimental Mechanics Honorary Member (1983)
- National Academy of Engineering (1984)
- Society for Experimental Mechanics Hetényi (1995)
- Society for Experimental Mechanics Tatnall (2001)
- Society for Experimental Mechanics Taylor (2002)
- American Society of Mechanical Engineers Drucker Medal (2012)
