= Robert H. Scanlan =

- Born: 1914; Chicago
- Died: May 27, 2001 (aged 86–87); Lawrenceville, New Jersey
- Education: Bachelor's and Master's Degrees in Mathematics (University of Chicago) Doctorate in Mathematics and Physics (MIT), Doctorate in Mechanics (Sorbonne)
- Spouse: Elizabeth Scanlan
- Children: Kate, Jean, Robert, Glenn
- Engineering career
- Discipline: Aeronautical and Civil Engineering
- Institutions: American Society of Civil Engineers, American Academy of Mechanics, National Academy of Engineering
- Significant advance: Analysis of bridge aerodynamics using flutter derivatives
- Awards: James Croes Medal; Nathan Newmark Medal; Theodore von Karman Medal (2000); Wellington Prize

Robert H. Scanlan (1914–2001) was an American civil and aeronautical engineer who came to be widely recognized as a leader in the analysis of wind effects on large structures. Scanlan created the concept of flutter derivatives to aid in the representation of self-excited forces in theoretical models. His research in the area of bridge aerodynamics made possible the construction of larger, sturdier, and more cost-effective bridges. Scanlan worked in both industry and academia, and his employers included Republic Aviation, the Federal Aviation Administration, the French agencies CNRS and ONERA, Schlumberger, the Case Institute of Technology, Princeton University, and Johns Hopkins University. In the course of his life, Scanlan published two textbooks, "Aircraft Vibration and Flutter" and "Wind Effects on Large Structures," which are used by engineers worldwide.

== Early career ==
Robert Scanlan was born in Chicago in 1914. He attended the University of Chicago, where he completed a bachelor's and a master's degree in mathematics. The next step in his education was to attend MIT, where he earned a doctorate in mathematics and physics. He was hired as an aeronautical engineer for Republic Aviation in New York, where he served as Chief of Aeroelasticity during World War Two. Following his wartime work, Scanlan was employed by the Federal Aviation Administration, and later became a professor at Rensselaer Polytechnic Institute. During this time, his energy was devoted to research in aeronautics and aeroelasticity, and he published "Aircraft Vibration and Flutter," which is considered to be a fundamental textbook on concepts in elasticity.

Scanlan eventually travelled to France, where he studied at the Sorbonne, completing a doctoral degree in mechanics. While in France, he was employed at CNRS (National Center for Scientific Research) and ONERA (French National Aerospace Research Center).

== Later career ==
After his time in France, Scanlan came back to the U.S. and accepted a job at Schlumberger, a leading oilfield services provider, and later became a member of the faculty at the Case Institute of Technology and Princeton University. Finally, in 1984 he joined the Department of Civil Engineering at Johns Hopkins University, where he stayed until his death. While at the latter two universities, Scanlan began to focus on what became known as wind engineering, and the rest of his career centered on this field. He began working on analyzing the aerodynamics and aeroelasticity of extensive structures like skyscrapers, bridges, and cooling towers. Along with former student Emil Simiu, Scanlan co-authored the book "Wind Effects on Structures," which is considered to be an essential reference concerning the dynamics of structures in response to air currents.

Robert Scanlan died at the age of 86 on May 27, 2001, in Lawrenceville, New Jersey. His death was attributed to heart failure.

== Contributions to Bridge Aerodynamics ==
Some of Robert Scanlan's most important contributions in the field of engineering were in the area of bridge aerodynamics. These included the introduction of flutter derivatives, which became widely used to analyze the aeroelasticity of bridges under wind loading, advances in the analysis of vortex-induced vibrations, and buffeting of incomplete bridges experiencing yawed wind. During his lifetime, Scanlan served as the main aerodynamic consultant for the San Francisco Oakland Bay Bridge, the Golden Gate Bridge, and the Kap Shui Mun Bridge in Hong Kong.

== Awards, honors, and memberships ==
Scanlan was a well-respected engineer and was awarded many honors during his life. These included the James Croes Medal, the Nathan Newmark Medal, the von Karmen Medal, and the Wellington Prize of the American Society of Civil Engineers (ASCE). Scanlan was active in the ASCE, of which he was an honorary member, and his other affiliations included the American Academy of Mechanics and the National Academy of Engineering. As a faculty member at Johns Hopkins University, Scanlan was given the title of Homewood Professor, an honor awarded to distinguished members of the faculty who are not tenured. Following his death, the ASCE established the Robert H. Scanlan Medal, which is awarded annually to a person who has made significant contributions in the field of engineering mechanics.

== Family ==
At the time of his death in 2001, Scanlan's family included his wife Elizabeth, his daughters Kate and Jean, his sons Robert and Glenn, eight grandchildren, and two great-grandchildren.
