= Applied Mechanics Division =

The Applied Mechanics Division (AMD) is a division in the American Society of Mechanical Engineers (ASME). The AMD was founded in 1927, with Stephen Timoshenko being the first chair. The current AMD membership is over 5000, out of about 90,000 members of the ASME. AMD is the largest of the six divisions in the ASME Basic Engineering Technical Group.

== Mission ==
The mission of the Applied Mechanics Division is to foster fundamental research in, and intelligent application of, applied mechanics.

== Summer Meeting ==
The Division participates annually in a Summer Meeting by programming Symposia and committee meetings. The principal organisers of the Summer Meetings rotate among several organizations, with a period of four years, as described below.

- Year 4n (2020, 2024, etc.): International Union of Theoretical and Applied Mechanics (IUTAM).
- Year 4n + 1 (2017, 2021, etc.): Materials Division of the ASME (joined with the Applied Mechanics Division of ASME, Engineering Mechanics of the American Society of Civil Engineers, and Society of Engineering Sciences).
- Year 4n + 2 (2018, 2022, etc.): National Committee of Theoretical and Applied Mechanics.
- Year 4n + 3 (2019, 2023, etc.): Applied Mechanics Division of the ASME (joined with Materials Division of ASME).

== Publications ==
- Newsletters of the Applied Mechanics Division
- Journal of Applied Mechanics
- Applied Mechanics Reviews

== Awards ==
- Timoshenko Medal
- Koiter Medal
- Drucker Medal
- Thomas K. Caughey Dynamics Award
- Ted Belytschko Applied Mechanics Award
- Thomas J.R. Hughes Young Investigator Award
- Journal of Applied Mechanics Award

These awards are conferred every year at the Applied Mechanics Division Banquet held during the annual ASME (IMECE) conference. Awards other than those mentioned above are also celebrated during this banquet, such as the Haythornthwaite Research Initiation Grant Award and the Eshelby Mechanics Award for Young Faculty.

== Executive committee ==
The responsibility for guiding the Division, within the framework of the ASME, is vested in an executive committee of five members. The executive committee meets twice a year at the Summer Meeting and Winter Annual Meeting. Members correspond throughout the year by emails and conference calls. Three members shall constitute a quorum, and all action items must be approved by a majority of the committee.

Each member serves a term of five years, beginning and ending at the conclusion of the Summer Meeting, spending one year in each of the following positions:

- Secretary
- Vice-chair of the Program Committee
- Chair of the Program Committee
- Vice-chair of the Division
- Chair of the Division

New members of the executive committee are sought from the entire membership of the Division. Due considerations are given to leadership, technical accomplishment, as well as diversity in geographic locations, sub-disciplines, and genders. At the Winter Annual Meeting each year, the executive committee nominates one new member, who is subsequently appointed by the ASME Council.

The executive committee has an additional non-rotating position, the Recording Secretary. The responsibility of the Recording Secretary is to attend and record minutes for the Executive Committee Meeting at the Summer and Winter Annual Meeting and the General Committee Meeting at the Winter Annual Meeting. The Recording Secretary serves a term of two years and is selected from the junior members (i.e. young investigators) of the AMD.

Current members of the Executive Committee

- Yashashree Kulkarni, University of Houston, Houston, TX, United States: Secretary
- Samantha Daly, University of California at Santa Barbara, Santa Barbara, CA, United States: Vice-chair of the Program Committee
- Narayana Aluru, University of Texas at Austin, Austin, TX, United States: Chair of the Program Committee
- Glaucio Paulino, Princeton University, Princeton NJ, United States: Vice-chair of the Division
- Marco Amabili, McGill University, Montreal, Canada: Chair of the Division

== Technical Committees ==
The mission of a Technical Committee is to promote a field in Applied Mechanics. The principal approach for a Technical Committee to accomplish this mission is to organize symposia at the Summer and Winter Meetings. Technical Committees generally meet at the Winter Annual Meeting and the Summer Meeting; they may also schedule special meetings.

There are 17 Technical Committees in the Applied Mechanics Division.

Technical Committees are established and dissolved by the executive committee.

== History ==
See Naghdi's "A Brief History of the Applied Mechanics Division of ASME" for details of the history from 1927 to 1977.

== Past chairs of the Applied Mechanics Division ==
Taher Saif (2023), Pradeep Guduru (2022), Yuri Bazilevs (2021), Yonggang Huang (2020), Balakumar Balachandran (2019), Pradeep Sharma (2018), Arun Shukla (2017), Peter Wriggers (2016), Huajian Gao (2015), Lawrence A. Bergman (2014), Ken Liechti (2013), Ares Rosakis (2012), Tayfun Tezduyar (2011), Zhigang Suo (2010), Dan Inman (2009), K. Ravi-Chandar (2008), Thomas N. Farris (2007), Wing Kam Liu (2006), Mary C. Boyce (2005), Pol Spanos (2004), Stelios Kyriakides (2003), Dusan Krajcinovic (2002), Thomas J.R. Hughes (2001), Alan Needleman (2000), Lallit Anand (1999), Stanley A. Berger (1998), Carl T. Herakovich (1997), Thomas A. Cruse (1996), John W. Hutchinson (1995), L.B. Freund (1994), David B. Bogy (1993), William S. Saric (1992), Ted Belytschko (1991), Michael J. Forrestal (1990), Sidney Leibovich (1989), Thomas L. Geers (1988), James R. Rice (1987), Michael M. Carroll (1986), Jan D. Achenbach (1985), Charles R. Steele (1984), William G. Gottenberg (1983), R.C. DiPrima (1982), R.M. Christensen (1981), R.S. Rivlin (1980), Richard Skalak (1979), F. Essenburg (1978), Yuan-Cheng Fung (1977), J. Miklowitz (1976), B.A. Boley (1975), George Herrmann (1974), J. Kestin (1973), Paul M. Naghdi (1972), S. Levy (1971), H.N. Abramson (1970), Stephen H. Crandall (1969), P.G. Hodge Jr. (1968), R. Plunkett (1967), M.V. Barton (1966), George F. Carrier (1965), Daniel C. Drucker (1964), E. Reissner (1963), A.M. Wahl (1961, 1962), S.B. Batdorf (1960), William Prager (1959), W. Ramberg (1958), M. Hetenyl (1957), Raymond D. Mindlin (1956), Nicholas J. Hoff (1955), N.M. Newmark (1954), D. Young (1953), R.E. Peterson (1952), L.H. Donnell (1951), R.P. Kroon (1950), M. Golan (1949), W.M. Murray (1948), H.W. Emmons (1947), H. Poritsky (1946), J.N. Goodier (1945), J.H. Keenan (1943, 1944), H.L. Dryden (1942), J.P. Den Hartog (1940, 1941), C.R. Soderberg (1937,1938), E.O. Waters (1936), J.A. Goff (1935), F.M. Lewis (1934), J.M. Lessells (1933), G.B. Pegram (1932), A.L. Kimball (1931), G.M. Eaton (1928, 1929), Stephen P. Timoshenko (1927, 1930)

== Relevant websites ==
- Homepage of Applied Mechanics Division
- iMechanica.org, a web of mechanics and mechanicians.
