= Rohan Abeyaratne =

Sri Lankan academic and engineer

- Born: Sri Lanka
- Education: California Institute of Technology; University of Ceylon; Royal College Colombo
- Occupation: Quentin Berg Professor of Mechanics
- Employer: Massachusetts Institute of Technology
- Awards: Drucker Medal (2010)

Rohan Abeyaratne (Sinhala: රොහාන් අබේරත්න) is a Sri Lankan born American academic and engineer and the Quentin Berg Professor of Mechanics at the Massachusetts Institute of Technology (MIT). He was the CEO & Director of the Singapore–MIT Alliance for Research and Technology (the "SMART" Centre), and prior to that the Head of the Department of Mechanical Engineering at MIT.

Born to L.B. "Malcolm" Abeyaratne, CCS former Secretary to the Treasury and Enid Abeyaratne, he was educated at the Royal College, Colombo where he won the Turnour Prize in 1967 and was Head Prefect in 1970. Thereafter he went on to gain his BSc in mechanical engineering from the University of Sri Lanka in 1975 where he won the E.O.E. Pereira Gold Medal. He went on to gain his MSc and PhD from the California Institute of Technology in 1976 and 1979 respectively.

Abeyaratne was Head of the Department of Mechanical Engineering at MIT from 2001 to 2008. In 2008 the Governing Board of the Singapore-MIT Alliance for Research and Technology (SMART) Centre appointed him as its CEO/Director, a position he held through 2013. The SMART Centre is MIT's first, and to date only, Institutional Research Center located outside Cambridge, Massachusetts.

Abeyaratne received the MacVicar Fellowship, MIT’s highest award for education in 2000; the Quentin Berg Professorship in 2001; the Daniel C. Drucker Medal from ASME in 2010, as well as its Fellowship in 1998. In 1996 he was made a Fellow of the American Academy of Mechanics and later was elected as its President.

== Publications ==
Among Abeyaratne's publications are;

- Evolution of Phase Transitions: a Continuum Theory, Cambridge University Press, 2006 (co-authored with J.K. Knowles)
- Lecture Notes on The Mechanics of Elastic Solids
- Volume I: A Brief Review of Some Mathematical Preliminaries, 2006
- Volume II: Continuum Mechanics, 2012
