= Arthur Leissa =

American engineer

Arthur W. Leissa is an American scientist specializing in the vibrations and dynamics of continuous systems fields.

== Education ==
Arthur Leissa went to the Ohio State University as an undergraduate, earning bachelor's and master's degrees in mechanical engineering in 1954. He worked for a year in industry before returning to Ohio State for doctoral studies. He completed his Ph.D. in 1958, and remained at Ohio State as a faculty member. At the time of his promotion to full professor in 1964, he was the youngest full professor at the university.

Leissa became president of the American Academy of Mechanics for 1987–88. He was elected as a Fellow of ASME in 1983. He was editor-in-chief of Applied Mechanics Reviews from 1993 to 2008.

== Selected publications ==
- Vibration of Plates, NASA, 1969, archived from the original on August 24, 2017
- Vibration of Shells, NASA, 1973
- Leissa, A.W. (December 1973), "The free vibration of rectangular plates", Journal of Sound and Vibration, 31 (3): 257–293, Bibcode:1973JSV....31..257L, doi:10.1016/s0022-460x(73)80371-2
