= Frank A. McClintock =

- Born: January 2, 1921; St. Paul, Minnesota
- Died: February 20, 2011 (aged 90); Needham, Massachusetts
- Education: Massachusetts Institute of Technology; California Institute of Technology
- Spouse(s): Mary McClintock (m.1945?-2011) (his death) 4 children Martha; Roger; David; Richard
- Awards: James Clayton Prize of the Institution of Mechanical Engineers; The Nadai Award; Drucker Medal; Howe Medal; The Griffith Medal of the European Structural Integrity Society
- Scientific career
- Fields: Mechanical engineering, Material science
- Workplaces: Massachusetts Institute of Technology

Frank A. McClintock (January 2, 1921 – February 20, 2011) of Concord, Massachusetts, was an American mechanical engineer in material science. A pioneer in the study of ductile fracture, McClintock was an Emeritus professor in the Department of Mechanical Engineering at Massachusetts Institute of Technology.

Along with Ali S. Argon in 1966 he co-authored a book titled Mechanical Behavior of Materials.

"His professional contributions revolutionized the understanding of the fracture process in engineering practice, by introducing a physical and mechanistic perspective emphasizing the plasticity aspects of ductile fracture and fatigue crack propagation."
