= Leon M. Keer =

American engineer (1934–2021)

Leon Morris Keer (September 13, 1934 – January 12, 2021) was an American researcher and professor in the fields of engineering and tribology. He served as Walter P. Murphy Professor in the McCormick School of Engineering, Northwestern University. Born in Los Angeles, Keer attended Caltech for his undergraduate studies, later receiving his doctorate from the University of Minnesota. He joined the faculty of Northwestern University in 1964, and worked as a professor there for the rest of his life.

Keer was born in Los Angeles on September 13, 1934. His parents were William and Sophie Keer, Jewish immigrants from Ukraine. He grew up around a group of three other friends; they attended Fairfax High School together, and all matriculated at the California Institute of Technology (Caltech). Keer received a B.S. in 1956 and an M.S. in 1958, both in mechanical engineering, from Caltech.

From 1956 to 1959, Keer worked at Hughes Aircraft Company, but decided to pursue further education and join academia. He studied under Lawrence E. Goodman at the University of Minnesota, receiving his Ph.D. in aeronautics and engineering mechanics in 1962. Later that year, Keer worked at Newcastle University as a NATO postdoctoral fellow studying elasticity with Albert E. Green. The next year, Keer began worked as a preceptor at Columbia University, before joining the McCormick School of Engineering of Northwestern University as an assistant professor of civil engineering. He was made a full professor in 1970, and was named to his professorship—Walter P. Murphy Professor in civil & environmental engineering and mechanical engineering—in 1994.

On January 12, 2021, Keer died, aged 86. He had married his wife, Barbara, in 1956; following his death, Barbara established a fellowship at Northwestern to financially support students.

During his career, Keer won various awards, including: a Guggenheim Fellowship (1972) as well as fellowship in the American Academy of Mechanics (1983), American Society of Mechanical Engineers (1984), Japan Society for the Promotion of Science (1986), American Society of Civil Engineers (1988), National Academy of Engineering (1997), and the Acoustical Society of America (2002).
