= Bruno A. Boley =

American engineer and academic (1924–2017)

Bruno A. Boley (May 13, 1924 – February 11, 2017) was the Dean of Engineering at Northwestern University for 20 years. He also served as an engineering faculty member at Ohio State University, Columbia University and Cornell University. He received the B.S. in Civil Engineering from City College of New York and the Sc.D. in Aeronautical Engineering from Brooklyn Polytechnic Institute. He was a member of the National Academy of Engineering.
