= Shaily Mahendra =

Indian-American civil and environmental engineer

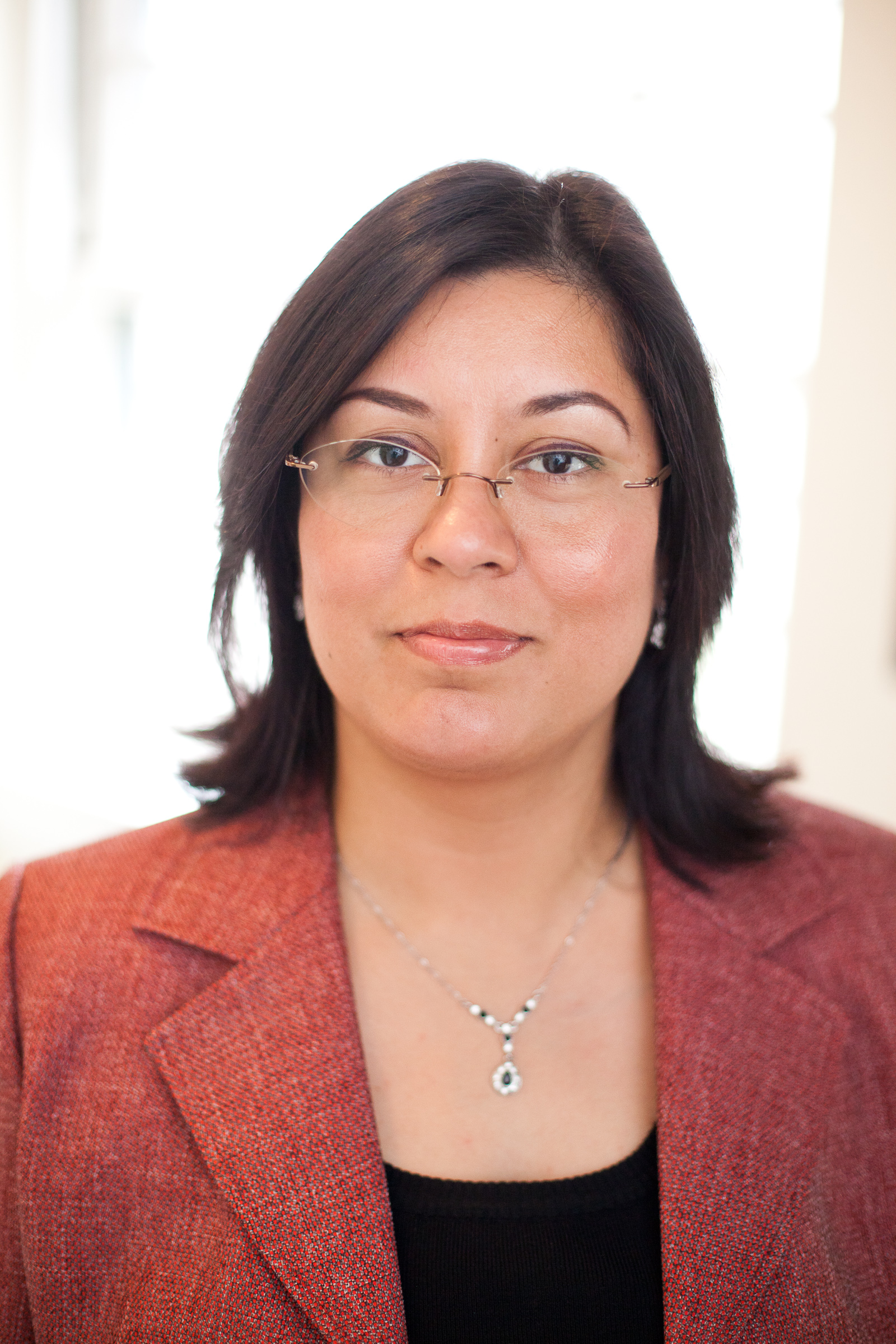
- Mahendra in 2011

Academic background
- Education: B. Tech, 1997, Indian Institutes of Technology; M.S., 2001, Syracuse University; PhD., 2007, University of California, Berkeley
- Thesis: Biodegradation of 1,4-Dioxane by aerobic bacteria: experimental studies and modeling of oxidation kinetics, co-contaminant effects, and biochemical pathways (2007)

Academic work
- Institutions: Rice University; University of California, Los Angeles
- Main interests: environmental toxicology applications of nanomaterial

Shaily Mahendra is an Indian-American civil and environmental engineer. She is an associate professor of civil and environmental engineering at the University of California, Los Angeles (UCLA).

== Career ==
After earning her PhD at the University of California, Berkeley, Mahendra accepted a research scientist position at Rice University. At Rice, Mahendra studied how silver nanoparticles contained in water filtration membranes, polymers, and oil paints, worked to disinfect viruses, bacteria, and fungi. She also led a project to explore natural and engineered bioremediation of 1,4-dioxane in colder climates.

Mahendra joined the faculty of civil and environmental engineering at the University of California, Los Angeles (UCLA) in 2009. Two years later, she was elected a Hellman Fellow and she conducted a project entitled “Biodegradation of Perfluorinated Compounds" which was submitted to the US Air Force Center for Engineering and the Environment. As a result of her research, Mahendra received the 2013 Faculty Early Career Development (CAREER) award from the National Science Foundation and UCLA's 2013 DuPont Young Professor award. The Dupont award was given to Mahendra for her development of cost-effective detection and remediation of microbes and fungi that could remedy chemical contaminants in groundwater at industrial sites. The next year, Mahendra was promoted to associate professor for the 2014–15 academic year. As an associate professor, Mahendra teamed up with Leonard Rom to develop a new technique that uses enzymes to remove pollutants from water which also minimizes risks to public health and the environment.

In 2017, Mahendra and her research team developed a method to package enzymes capable of destroying contaminants through biodegradation together into nanoparticle “vaults.” They then immobilized the enzyme vaults in sol-gels, which would help scale up production and integrate vaults at treatment plants. As a result, Mahendra was elected to the Association of Environmental Engineering and Science Professors Board of Directors. She later received the Paul L. Busch award for technology to clean water of pollutants.

The next year, Mahendra received a 2018 Mahatma Gandhi Pravasi Samman award from the Government of India Non-Resident Indian Welfare Society for her "distinguished record of outstanding service, achievements and contributions." In 2019, Mahendra received the 2019 Walter L. Huber Civil Engineering Research Prize from American Society of Civil Engineers for "pioneering the application of enzyme-nanoparticle vaults in water treatment."
