= Jian Cao =

Mechanical engineer

Jian Cao is a materials scientist and mechanical engineer whose research includes the mechanical behavior and manufacturing of sheet metal and woven composite materials, including dieless deformation and laser additive manufacturing processes. She is Cardiss Collins Professor of Mechanical Engineering at Northwestern University and director of the Northwestern Initiative for Manufacturing Science and Innovation.

== Education and career ==
Cao studied materials science and engineering and automatic control at Shanghai Jiao Tong University, earning a bachelor's degree there in 1989. She went to the Massachusetts Institute of Technology (MIT) for graduate study in mechanical engineering, earned a master's degree there in 1992, and completed her Ph.D. in 1995, under the supervision of Mary Cunningham Boyce.

After postdoctoral research at MIT, she became an assistant professor at Northwestern University in 1995. She was promoted to associate professor in 2002, and served as a program director at the National Science Foundation from 2003 to 2005. Returning to Northwestern, she became a full professor in 2008, adding courtesy affiliations with the Department of Civil and Environmental Engineering in 2010 and with the Department of Materials Science and Engineering in 2018. From 2012 to 2021 she also served as the university's Associate Vice President for Research. She was named Cardiss Collins Professor in 2016.

Cao founded the Northwestern Initiative for Manufacturing Science and Innovation in 2015, and has been director since its founding. In 2016, she became a Senior Institute Fellow at Argonne National Laboratory. She has been editor-in-chief of the Journal of Materials Processing Technology since 2018.

== Recognition ==
Cao was elected as an ASME Fellow in 2006, as a Fellow of the Society of Manufacturing Engineers in 2010 (SME), as a Fellow of the International Academy for Production Engineering in 2014, and as a Fellow of the American Association for the Advancement of Science in 2018, recognized "for her fundamental contributions to the understanding of failure mechanisms in forming processes and for innovations to advance flexible manufacturing processes". She was elected to the National Academy of Engineering in 2022, "for pioneering a flexible sheet forming system and for leadership in manufacturing", and to the American Academy of Arts and Sciences in 2023.

She received the ASME Thomas J.R. Hughes Young Investigator Award in 2006, the Distinguished Service Award of the ASME Manufacturing Engineering Division in 2009 and 2013, the ASME Dedicated Service Award in 2011, the ASME Charles Russ Richards Memorial Award in 2017, the ASME Milton C. Shaw Manufacturing Research Medal in 2020, and the ASME Ted Belytschko Applied Mechanics Division Award in 2023. She was the 2016 winner of the SME Frederick W. Taylor Research Medal, and the 2020 winner of the SME Gold Medal, "for her creative and pioneering contributions to the development of the scientific and technological bases of innovative manufacturing processes through extensive publication, speaking and public service activities".
