= Thomas J.R. Hughes Young Investigator Award =

The Special Achievement Award for Young Investigators in Applied Mechanics is an award given annually by the Applied Mechanics Division, of American Society of Mechanical Engineers (ASME). The Award is presented at the Applied Mechanics Annual Dinner at the ASME Congress. In 2008, this award was renamed to the Thomas J.R. Hughes Young Investigator Award.

== Nomination procedure ==
A letter of nomination, several letters of support, along with any other supporting materials, should be sent by email to the chair of the Executive Committee of the Applied Mechanics Division. Nominees must not have reached their 40th birthday at the time of nomination. See the list of current members of the Award Committee

== Recipients ==
- 2023 – Cunjiang Yu
- 2022 – Nanshu Lu and Shawn A. Chester
- 2021 – Sinan Keten
- 2020 – Xuanhe Zhao
- 2019 – Yihui Zhang
- 2018 – Liping Liu and Dennis Kochmann
- 2017 – José E. Andrade
- 2016 – Pedro Miguel Reis
- 2015 – Thao (Vicky) D. Nguyen
- 2014 – Katia Bertoldi and Ryan S. Elliott
- 2013 – Wei Cai
- 2012 – Yuri Bazilevs, Xi Chen and Kenji Takizawa
- 2011 – Markus J. Buehler and Ioannis Chasiotis
- 2010 – Harley T. Johnson
- 2009 – Pradeep Sharma
- 2008 – Chad Landis
- 2007 – Assad Oberai
- 2006 – Jian Cao
- 2005 – George Haller and L. Mahadevan
- 2004 – Kaushik Bhattacharya
- 2003 – L. Cate Brinson
- 2002 – None Presented
- 2001 – Zhigang Suo
- 2000 – Pedro Ponte-Castaneda
- 1999 – Huajian Gao
- 1998 – Mary C. Boyce

== See also ==
- List of mechanical engineering awards
- Applied Mechanics Division
- American Society of Mechanical Engineers
- Applied mechanics
- Mechanician
