= Minsker =

Minsker is a surname, meaning someone from Minsk. Notable people with the surname include:

- Barbara Minsker, American civil, environmental, and systems engineer
- Ethan Minsker (born 1969), American writer, filmmaker, artist, and publisher
- Noa Minsker (born 1993), Israeli judoka
- Yonah Minsker (1901–1941), Jewish scholar from Belarus, murdered by Nazis in Lithuania

Minsker is a surname of Jewish origin, derived from the city of Minsk, the capital of Belarus. It is a habitational surname, indicating that the original bearer was from or associated with Minsk. The name Minsk itself is believed to originate from the Old East Slavic word mena, meaning "swamp" or "marsh".

== See also ==
- Kasper Mansker (also spelled Minsker, c. 1750–1820), early European explorer and settler in Tennessee
