= Medhat Haroun =

Egyptian-American expert on earthquake engineering

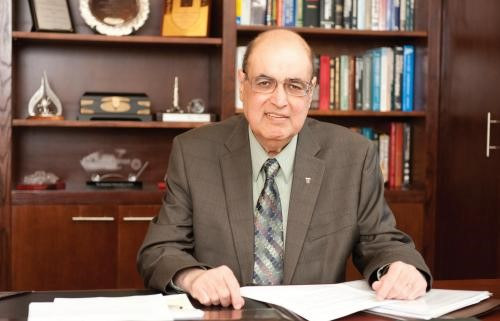
- Born: Medhat Ahmed Haroun; November 30, 1951; Cairo, Egypt
- Died: October 18, 2012 (aged 60)
- Education: Cairo University, California Institute of Technology
- Known for: Earthquake engineering
- Awards: Charles Martin Duke Lifeline; Earthquake Engineering Award (2006), Walter Huber Civil Engineering; Research Prize (1992)
- Scientific career
- Fields: Civil engineering
- Workplaces: The American University in Cairo, University of California, Irvine, California Institute of Technology, Cairo University

Medhat Haroun (Arabic: مدحت هارون, November 30, 1951 – October 18, 2012) was an Egyptian-American expert on earthquake engineering. He wrote more than 300 technical papers and received the Charles Martin Duke Lifeline Earthquake Engineering Award (2006) and the Walter Huber Civil Engineering Research Prize (1992) from the American Society of Civil Engineers.

== Birth and education ==
Medhat Ahmed Haroun was born on November 30, 1951, in Cairo, Egypt. His father, Ahmed, was a surgeon and his mother, Sadia, the chair of the pharmacology department at Ain Shams University in Cairo. He received a bachelor's degree in engineering from Cairo University before moving to the United States to complete his M.S. and Ph.D. degrees at the California Institute of Technology in Pasadena, California, working with his advisor George Housner, an eminent authority on earthquake engineering and National Medal of Science laureate.

== Academic career ==
After graduating as valedictorian of his Civil Engineering class at Cairo University in 1973, he worked as a full-time instructor in the Structural Engineering Division at Cairo University for two years, before moving to the United States to complete his M.S. and Ph.D. degrees at the California Institute of Technology.

He obtained his M.S. and Ph.D. degrees in Structural and Earthquake Engineering from the California Institute of Technology in 1976 and 1979, respectively. He focused on the seismic response of fluid-structure systems. He continued as a Research Fellow and Lecturer at the California Institute of Technology until 1981, where he then joined the University of California, Irvine (UCI) as a Professor. He taught at the University of California, Irvine, for nearly twenty years and served as two-term Chair of the Department of Civil and Environmental Engineering (CEE).

He was instrumental in the growth and development of the CEE program at UCI. He was Chair when the Engineering Gateway Building was constructed, was key in creating the Structural Engineering Test Hall, and led the CEE Affiliates support on the development of the Shake Table in the Structures Lab Facility. His work, research, and mentorship made a pronounced impact on the civil engineering industry and the University of California, Irvine.

During his tenure, the "Friends of Civil Engineering" affiliates group at the University of California, Irvine was developed with industry leaders, and later renamed the "Civil and Environmental Engineering Affiliates". The group represents a critical link between the university and the local engineering community, by providing guidance on curricula, delivering professional aspects of the CEE program, providing employment opportunities for students and engaging the community with regularly scheduled symposia.

In 1999, he moved back to Egypt, where he assumed the position of AGIP Professor in the Department of Construction Engineering (Structures) and Chair of the Department of Engineering at The American University in Cairo (AUC). In 2005, he became the Dean of the School of Sciences and Engineering (SSE) at the AUC, where he embarked on an ambitious strategic plan to transform SSE into a world-class school. He oversaw an unprecedented expansion of the academic undergraduate and graduate programs, establishment of the first ever Ph.D. Program at AUC in Applied Sciences and Engineering, a substantial increase in extramural research funding for cutting-edge research, and enhancement of university-industry relations.

He later became Provost of the American University in Cairo in January 2011, assuming the role of the university's chief academic officer. With his announcement as Provost, he became the first Provost of Egyptian descent in AUC History. As provost, he launched a new strategic academic plan for the university and signed a number of agreements with many national and international entities, including a Memorandum of Understanding (MOU) with "Ma'an" NGO to help transform slums into sustainable communities and an MOU with the League of Arab States to support the development of teachers' capacity across the Middle East. During his tenure, the School of Continuing Education signed an MOU with the Egyptian E-Learning University to enhance its programs of distance learning, and the Center of Translation Studies signed an agreement with the Ministry of Culture to provide support for its activities. In 2011–2012, AUC's academic area experienced its largest ever faculty recruiting season, recruiting top faculty in various disciplines.

He continued on as Provost of The American University in Cairo until his death on October 18, 2012, of pancreatic cancer.

In October 2013, The American University in Cairo dedicated the Medhat Haroun Atrium, with key architectural features and an inscribed plaque that reads "In memory of a pioneering engineer, beloved teacher, imaginative administrator, loyal colleague and faithful friend", at the entrance to the School of Sciences and Engineering. The American University in Cairo is also establishing a scholarship fund in his memory. In 2014, the Medhat Haroun Engineering Fellowship was established at the University of California, Irvine, to provide annual support to Ph.D. students in the Department of Civil and Environmental Engineering.

=== Research ===
His research efforts were concerned with the theoretical and experimental modeling of the behavior of structural systems under seismic loading, and are published in more than 300 technical papers. His primary areas of research were regarding dynamic analysis of ground-based, elevated, buried and submerged tanks; seismic response and retrofit of bridge structures including pier walls, pinned columns, and columns jacketed with advanced composite materials; active and passive control of the dynamic response of buildings; soil-structure interaction, and earthquake response of both as-built and retrofitted tilt-up concrete walls, infilled reinforced concrete frames, masonry walls, and composite walls.

=== Awards and honours ===
- Excellence in Academic Service Award, American University in Cairo, 2010.
- AUC President's Distinguished Service Award, American University in Cairo, 2008.
- C.M. Duke Lifeline Earthquake Engineering Award, American Society of Civil Engineers, 2006.
- Excellence in Undergraduate Teaching, Parents Association, American University in Cairo, 2003.
- Distinguished Engineering Educator Award, Orange County Engineering Council, 2000.
- Distinguished Faculty Lectureship Award for Teaching, University of California, Irvine, 1996.
- Distinguished Engineering Educator Award, LA Council of Engineers & Scientists, 1995.
- Walter Huber Civil Engineering Research Prize, American Society of Civil Engineers, 1992.
- Valedictorian of Graduating Class in Civil Engineering, 1973.

== Publications ==
- Reduced and Selective Integration Techniques in the Finite Element Analysis of Plates, T.J. Hughes, M. Cohen, and M. A. Haroun, Nuclear Engineering and Design, Vol. 46, March 1978, pp. 203–222.
- "Vibration Tests of Full-Scale Liquid Storage Tanks," G.W. Housner and M.A. Haroun, Proceedings of Second U.S. National Conference on Earthquake Engineering, Stanford, California, August 1979, pp. 137–145.
- "Free Lateral Vibrations of Liquid Storage Tanks," M.A. Haroun and G.W. Housner, Proceedings of the Third EMD Specialty Conference, ASCE, Austin, Texas, September 1979, pp. 466–470.
- "Dynamic Analyses of Liquid Storage Tanks," G.W. Housner and M.A. Haroun, Proceedings of the Seventh World Conference on Earthquake Engineering, Istanbul, Turkey, Vol. 8, September 1980, pp. 431–438.
- "Dynamic Interaction of Liquid Storage Tanks and Foundation Soil," M.A. Haroun and G.W. Housner, Dynamic Response of Structures: Experimentations, Observations, Prediction and Control, ASCE, January 1981, pp. 346–360.
- "Seismic Design of Liquid Storage Tanks," M.A. Haroun and G.W. Housner, Proceedings of the Journal of Technical Councils, ASCE, Vol. 107, No. TC1, April 1981, pp. 191–207. Also presented at the ASCE National Convention and Exposition, Portland, Oregon, April 1980.
- "Earthquake Response of Deformable Liquid Storage Tanks," M.A. Haroun and G.W. Housner, Proceedings of the Journal of Applied Mechanics, ASME, Vol. 48, No. 2, June 1981, pp. 411–418. Also presented at the Pressure Vessels and Piping Technology Conference, San Francisco, California, August 1980.
- "Seismic Analysis of Elevated Water Storage Tanks," M.A. Haroun and H.M. Ellaithy, presented at ASCE Conference held in Las Vegas, Nevada, April 1982.
- "Characteristics of Ground Motion of the San Fernando Earthquake," M.A. Haroun and G.W. Housner, Proceedings of the Third International Conference on Microzonation, Vol. I, Seattle, Washington, June 1982, pp. 389–399.
- "A Study on Strong Motion Data of the 1979 Imperial Valley Earthquake," M. Huang, M.A. Haroun and G.W. Housner, Proceedings of the Third International Conference on Microzonation, Vol. I, Seattle, Washington, June 1982, pp. 401–412.
- "Dynamic Characteristics of Liquid Storage Tanks," M.A. Haroun and G.W. Housner, Proceedings of the Journal of Engineering Mechanics Division, ASCE, Vol. 108, No. EM5, October 1982, pp. 783–800.
- "Complications in Free Vibration Analysis of Tanks," M.A. Haroun and G.W. Housner, Proceedings of the Journal of Engineering Mechanics Division, ASCE, Vol. 108, No. EM5, October 1982, pp. 801–818.
- "Vibration Studies and Tests of Liquid Storage Tanks," M.A. Haroun, Proceedings of the International Journal of Earthquake Engineering and Structural Dynamics, Vol. 11, March 1983, pp. 179–206.
- "Behavior of Unanchored Oil Storage Tanks: Imperial Valley Earthquake," M.A. Haroun, Journal of Technical Topics in Civil Engineering, ASCE, Vol. 109, No. 1, April 1983, pp. 23–40. Also presented at ASCE International Convention, New York, NY, May 1981.
- "Analytical Evaluation of Axisymmetrical Dynamic Characteristics of Cylindrical Tanks," M.A. Haroun and M.A. Tayel, Proceedings of the Fourth ASCE/EMD Specialty Conference, West Lafayette, Indiana, May 1983, pp. 283–286.
- "Numerical Investigation of Axisymmetrical Vibrations of Partly-Filled Cylindrical Tanks," M.A. Haroun and M.A. Tayel, Proceedings of International Symposium on Lifeline Earthquake Engineering, ASME, Portland, Oregon, June 1983, pp. 69–77.
- "TANK- A Computer Program for Seismic Analysis of Liquid Storage Tanks," M.A. Haroun and W. Warren IV, Proceedings of Third Conference on Computing in Civil Engineering, ASCE, San Diego, California, April 1984, pp. 665–674.
- "Stress Analysis of Rectangular Walls Under Seismically Induced Hydrodynamic Loads," M.A. Haroun, Bulletin of the Seismological Society of America, Vol. 74, No. 3, June 1984, pp. 1031–1041.
- "Dynamic Behavior of Cylindrical Liquid Storage Tanks Under Vertical Earthquake Excitation," M.A. Haroun and M.A. Tayel, Proceedings of the 8th World Conference on Earthquake Engineering, Vol. VII, San Francisco, California, July 1984, pp. 421–428.
- "Liquid Sloshing in Cylindrical Tanks," M.A. Haroun, Proceedings of the Fifth Engineering Mechanics Specialty Conference, ASCE, Vol. 2, Laramie, Wyoming, August 1984, pp. 751–754.
- "Hydrodynamic Pressures on Deformable Sloping Dams," M.A. Haroun and E.A. Abdel-Hafiz, Proceedings of the Fifth Engineering Mechanics Specialty Conference, ASCE, Vol. 2, Laramie, Wyoming, August 1984, pp. 1077–1080.
- "Model for Flexible Tanks Undergoing Rocking," M.A. Haroun and H.M. Ellaithy, Journal of Engineering Mechanics, ASCE, Vol. 111, No. 2, February 1985, pp. 143–157.
- "Axisymmetrical Vibrations of Tanks - Numerical," M.A. Haroun and M.A. Tayel, Journal of Engineering Mechanics, ASCE, Vol. 111, No. 3, March 1985, pp. 329–345.
- "Axisymmetrical Vibrations of Tanks - Analytical," M.A. Haroun and M.A. Tayel, Journal of Engineering Mechanics, ASCE, Vol. 111, No. 3, March 1985, pp. 346–358.
- "Earthquake Induced Damage of Liquid Storage Tanks and Lessons Learned," M.A. Haroun, Proceedings of the Workshop on Loading, Analysis and Stability of Thin Shell Bins, Tanks and Silos, the University of Sydney, Australia, March 1985, pp. 145–151.
- "Axisymmetrical Vibration Tests on Liquid Filled Tanks," M.A. Haroun and D.J. Dimas, presented at the Second Joint ASME/ASCE Conference on Mechanics, Albuquerque, New Mexico, June 1985.
- "Microcomputer Modeling of Earthquake Response of Liquid Filled Tanks," M.A. Haroun and W. Warren IV, Proceedings of the Pressure Vessels and Piping Conference, PVP-Vol. 98–4, ASME, New Orleans, June 1985, pp. 61–68.
- "Response of Liquid Storage Tanks under Vertical Excitation with Soil-Structure Interaction," M.A. Haroun and E.A. Abdel-Hafiz, presented at the Second International Conference on Soil Dynamics and Earthquake Engineering, June 1985.
- "Inelastic Seismic Response of Braced Towers Supporting Tanks," M.A. Haroun, N.M. Haroun and H.M. Ellaithy, Journal of Computers and Structures, Vol. 20, No. 1-3, 1985, pp. 605–613. Also presented at the Symposium on Advances and Trends in Structures and Dynamics, NASA, Washington, D.C., October 1984.
- "Response of Tanks to Vertical Seismic Excitations," M.A. Haroun and M.A. Tayel, International Journal of Earthquake Engineering and Structural Dynamics, Vol. 13, No. 5, September 1985, pp. 583–595.
- "Internal Seismic Forces on Submerged Oil Tanks," M.A. Haroun and R. Chang, Journal of the Waterway, Port, Coastal and Ocean Engineering, ASCE, Vol. 111, No. 6, November 1985, pp. 1000–1008.
- "Seismically Induced Fluid Forces on Elevated Tanks," M.A. Haroun and H.M. Ellaithy, Journal of Technical Topics in Civil Engineering, ASCE, Vol. 111, No. 1, December 1985, pp. 1–15.
- "Vibrations of Submerged Solids in a Vibrating Container," M.A. Haroun and F. Bashardoust, Proceedings of Third Specialty Conference on Dynamic Response of Structures, ASCE, Los Angeles, California, March 1986, pp. 590–597.
- "Frequency Domain Analysis of a Tank-Soil System," M.A. Haroun and E.A. Abdel-Hafiz, Proceedings of Recent Advances in Structural Dynamics, ASCE, Seattle, Washington, April 1986, pp. 40–50.
- "Recent Advances in the Dynamic Analysis of Liquid Filled Tanks," M.A. Haroun, Proceedings of the Second Conference on Applied Mechanical Engineering, Military Technical College, Cairo, Egypt, May 1986, pp. 93–102.
- "A Formulation of Liquid Added Mass for Dynamic Analysis of Fluid-Structure Systems," M.A. Haroun, Proceedings of the Conference on Advancements in Aerodynamics, Fluid Mechanics and Hydraulics, ASCE, Minneapolis, Minnesota, June 1986, pp. 609–616.
- "Seismic Analysis of X-braced Elevated Tanks," M.A. Haroun and H.M. Ellaithy, Proceedings of the Third U.S. National Conference on Earthquake Engineering, Vol. 4, Charleston, S. Carolina, August 1986, pp. 2811–2822.
- "Design of Large Storage Tanks in Seismic Areas," M.A. Haroun, Proceedings of the Eighth European Conference on Earthquake Engineering, Vol. 5, 8.3, Lisbon, Portugal, September 1986, pp. 89–96.
- "A Simplified Seismic Analysis of Rigid Base Liquid Storage Tanks under Vertical Excitation with Soil-Structure Interaction," M.A. Haroun and E.A. Abdel-Hafiz, International Journal of Soil Dynamics and Earthquake Engineering, Vol. 5, No. 4, October 1986, pp. 217–225.
- "Hydrodynamic Pressures on Tanks by Momentum Balance," M.A. Haroun, Journal of Pressure Vessels Technology, ASME, Vol. 108, No. 4, November 1986, pp. 413–417. Also presented at Fifth Pressure Vessels and Piping Technology Conference, ASME, San Antonio, Texas, June 1984.
- "Advances in the Seismic Analysis of Liquid Storage Tanks," M.A. Haroun, Proceedings of the Eighth Symposium on Earthquake Engineering, University of Roorkee, India, December 1986, pp. 585–592.
- "Nonlinear Behavior of Tanks under Axisymmetric Excitation," M.A. Haroun, Proceedings of Computer Aided Simulation of Fluid-Structure Interaction Problems, ASCE, Atlantic City, New Jersey, April 1987, pp. 47–61.
- "Seismic Analysis of Pedestal Tower Supporting Tank," M.A. Haroun and H.M. Ellaithy, presented at the Third International Conference on Soil Dynamics and Earthquake Engineering, Princeton, New Jersey, June 1987.
- "Nonlinear Uplift Analysis of Crescent-Shaped Plate," M.A. Haroun, H.S. Badawi, and C.B. Nanda, Proceedings of the Symposium on Seismic Engineering, Recent Advances in Design, Analysis, Testing and Qualification Methods, PVP-127, ASME, San Diego, California, June 1987, pp. 317–324.
- "Earthquake Response Analysis of an Earth Dam," M.A. Haroun and E.A. Abdel-Hafiz, Proceedings of the Fifth Canadian Conference on Earthquake Engineering, Ottawa, Canada, July 1987, pp. 321–330.
- "Nonlinear Axisymmetric Uplift of Circular Plates," M.A. Haroun and H.S. Badawi, Dynamics of Structures, Proceedings of the Sixth Structures Congress, ASCE, Orlando, Florida, August 1987, pp. 77–89.
- "Seismic Response Analysis of Earth Dams under Differential Ground Motion," M.A. Haroun and E.A. Abdel-Hafiz, Bulletin of Seismological Society of America, Vol. 77, No. 5, October 1987, pp. 1514–1529.
- "Seismic Design of Ground-Based and Elevated Tanks," M.A. Haroun, Proceedings of the 56th Annual Convention, Structural Engineers Association of California, San Diego, California, October 1987, pp. 400–417.
- "Seismic Behavior of Unanchored Ground-Based Cylindrical Tanks," M.A. Haroun and H.S. Badawi, Proceedings of Ninth World Conference on Earthquake Engineering, Vol. VI, Tokyo-Kyoto, Japan, August 1988, pp. 643–648.
- "Seismic Large Amplitude Liquid Sloshing - Theory," M.A. Haroun and W. Chen, Seismic Engineering: Research and Practice, Proceedings of Seventh Structures and Pacific Rim Engineering Congress, ASCE, San Francisco, California, May 1989, pp. 418–427.
- "Dynamic Behavior of Shell Towers Supporting Liquid Filled Tanks," M.A. Haroun, L.R. Lee and H.M. Ellaithy, Proceedings of Sloshing and Fluid Structure Vibrations, Pressure Vessels and Piping Conference, ASME, Vol. 157, Honolulu, Hawaii, July 1989, pp. 1–7.
- "Analysis of Uplifted Rectangular Plates," M.A. Haroun and H.S. Badawi, Proceedings of the Symposium on Earthquake Behavior of Buried Pipelines, Storage, Telecommunication and Transportation Facilities, PVP Conference, ASME, Vol. 162, Honolulu, Hawaii, July 1989, pp. 95–101.
- "Interaction of Flexible Foundation with Underlying Soil due to Uplifting Seismic Loading," M.A. Haroun and H.S. Badawi, Proceedings of the AEC Conference, Vol. 4, Cairo, Egypt, December 1989, pp. 191–204.
- "Assessment of Seismic Hazards to Liquid Storage Tanks at Port Facilities," M.A. Haroun, Proceedings of POLA Seismic Workshop, Los Angeles, California, March 1990, pp. 543–558.
- "Static Uplift Analyses of Unanchored Tanks," M.A. Haroun, H.S. Badawi, and G.P. Bains, Proceedings of the Fourth U.S. National Conference on Earthquake Engineering, Vol. III, Palm Springs, California, May 1990, pp. 157–166.
- "Experimental Modal Analysis of Cylindrical Liquid-Filled Shells," S.A. Mourad and M.A. Haroun, Proceedings of the Fourth U.S. National Conference on Earthquake Engineering, Vol. III, Palm Springs, California, May 1990, pp. 177–186.
- "Comparison of Available Analytical Options for Cylindrical Storage Tank Response Subjected to Ground Motions," W.L. Warren and M.A. Haroun, Proceedings of the Fourth U.S. National Conference on Earthquake Engineering, Vol. III, Palm Springs, California, May 1990, pp. 207–216.
- "Buckling Behavior of Liquid Filled Shells Under Seismic Loads," M.A. Haroun and S.A. Mourad, Proceedings of Flow-Structure Vibration and Sloshing, PVP Conference, ASME, Vol. 191, Nashville, Tennessee, June 1990, pp. 11–17.
- "Seismic Retrofit of Bridge Pier Walls," A.C. Costley, S.J. Ficcadenti, N.H. Flynn, R.P. Kazanjy, S.A. Mourad, M.A. Haroun, G.C. Pardoen and R. Shepherd, Proceedings of the Second NSF Workshop on Bridge Engineering Research in Progress, Reno, Nevada, October 1990, pp. 257–260.
- "Effects of Aggregate Gradation on Lightweight Concrete Properties," C.V. Yland, D.J. White and M.A. Haroun, Proceedings of the Symposium on Innovations in Precasting and Prestressing, Singapore, November 1990, pp. 127–132.
- "Evolution of Seismic Response Theories of Liquid Storage Tanks from Inception to Near Maturity," M.A. Haroun, presented at the Ninth Indian Symposium on Earthquake Engineering, Roorkee, India, December 1990.
- "Dynamic Interaction of Dam-Reservoir Systems," M.A. Haroun and E.A. Abdel-Hafiz, the International Journal of Earthquake Engineering, No. 1, January 1991, pp. 53–70.
- "Identification of Site Amplification of Long Period Ground Motion from Liquid Sloshing," M.A. Haroun, presented at the Second International Conference on Recent Advances in Geotechnical Earthquake Engineering and Soil Dynamics, St. Louis, March 1991.
- "Dynamic Characteristics of Liquid-Filled Tanks by Modal Analysis Techniques," S.A. Mourad and M.A. Haroun, Proceedings of the Ninth International Modal Analysis Conference, Vol. 1, Florence, Italy, April 1991, pp. 810–815.
- "Modal Analysis to Determine Response Characteristics of Reinforced Concrete Bridge Components," N.H. Flynn, A.C. Costley, S.J. Ficcadenti, R.P. Kazanjy, M.A. Haroun, G.C. Pardoen and R. Shepherd, Proceedings of the Ninth International Modal Analysis Conference, Vol. 2, Florence, Italy, April 1991, pp. 1468–1472.
- "Vibration Suppression Through Liquid Oscillations," M.A. Haroun, S.A. Mourad and P.W. Pence, Mechanics Computing in 1990's and Beyond, Proceedings of the Engineering Mechanics Specialty Conference, ASCE, Vol. 2, Columbus, Ohio, May 1991, pp. 656–660.
- "Soil-Structure Interaction Effects on Seismic Response of Elevated, Ground-Based, and Buried Tanks," M.A. Haroun and M.K. Temraz, Proceedings of the Sixth Canadian Conference on Earthquake Engineering, Toronto, Canada, June 1991, pp. 413–420.
- "Reduced Scale Test of a Pier Wall under Strong-Axis Cyclic Loading," N.H. Flynn, A.C. Costley, S.A. Mourad, M.A. Haroun, G.C. Pardoen and R. Shepherd, Proceedings of the International Conference on Buildings with Load Bearing Concrete Walls in Seismic Zones, Paris, France, June 1991, pp. 134–141.
- "Implications of Observed Earthquake Induced Damage on Seismic Codes and Standards of Tanks," M.A. Haroun, Proceedings of Fluid-Structure Vibration and Sloshing, Pressure Vessels and Piping Conference, ASME, Vol. PVP-223, San Diego, California, June 1991, pp. 1–7.
- "Seismic Retrofit of Bridge Pier Walls," S.A. Mourad, N.H. Flynn, M.A. Haroun, G.C. Pardoen and R. Shepherd, Proceedings of the Third U.S. Conference on Lifeline Earthquake Engineering, ASCE, Los Angeles, California, August 1991, pp. 176–185.
- "Performance of Liquid Storage Tanks During the 1989 Loma Prieta Earthquake," M.A. Haroun, S.A. Mourad and W. Abou-Izzeddine, Proceedings of the Third U.S. Conference on Lifeline Earthquake Engineering, ASCE, Los Angeles, California, August 1991, 1152-1161.
- "Computational Methods for the Nonlinear Analysis of Fluid-Structure Systems," M.A. Haroun, Proceedings of the US-Korea-Japan Trilateral Workshop on Frontier Research and Development for Constructed Facilities, Honolulu, Hawaii, October 1991, pp. 288–297.
- "Strong Axis and Weak Axis Strength of Pier Walls," M.A. Haroun, G.C. Pardoen and R. Shepherd, Proceedings of the First Annual Seismic Research Workshop, California Department of Transportation, Sacramento, California, December 1991, pp. 47–56.
- "Strength of Column Pins at the Base of Elevated Roadways," M.A. Haroun, G.C. Pardoen and R. Shepherd, Proceedings of the First Annual Seismic Research Workshop, California Department of Transportation, Sacramento, California, December 1991, pp. 125–134.
- "Experimental and Theoretical Modal Analysis of a Braced Tower," M.A. Haroun and S.A. Mourad, Proceedings of Tenth International Modal Analysis Conference and Exposition, Vol. 2, San Diego, California, February 1992, pp. 1420–1425.
- "Parametric Study of Seismic Soil-Tank Interaction: Horizontal Excitation," M.A. Haroun and W. Abou-Izzeddine, Journal of Structural Engineering, ASCE, Vol. 118, No. 3, March 1992, pp. 783–797.
- "Parametric Study of Seismic Soil-Tank Interaction: Vertical Excitation," M.A. Haroun and W. Abou-Izzeddine, Journal of Structural Engineering, ASCE, Vol. 118, No. 3, March 1992, pp. 798–812.
- "Vibration Reduction by Liquid-Motivated Control Systems," M.A. Haroun and S.A. Mourad, Proceedings of International Colloquium on Structural Engineering, Cairo, Egypt, April 1992, pp. 101–110.
- "Effects of Soil-Structure Interaction on Seismic Response of Elevated Tanks," M.A. Haroun and M.K. Temraz, International Journal of Soil Dynamics and Earthquake Engineering, Vol. 11, No. 2, 1992, pp. 73–86.
- "Small Versus Large Amplitude Theories for Liquid Sloshing in Seismically-Excited Rectangular Containers," M.A. Haroun and W. Chen, presented at the Symposium on Fluid-Structure Vibrations and Sloshing, PVP Conference, ASME, New Orleans, Louisiana, June 1992.
- "Shear Strength Capacity of Bridge Column Pins," M.A. Haroun, G.C. Pardoen and R. Shepherd, Proceedings of Symposium on Seismic Ground Motions, Response, Repair and Instrumentation of Pipes and Bridges, PVP-Vol. 227, New Orleans, Louisiana, June 1992, pp. 41–45.
- "Non-deterministic Seismic Analysis of Steel Towers Supporting Elevated Tanks," M.A. Haroun and H.I. Mobarek, presented at Specialty Conference on Probabilistic Mechanics and Structural and Geotechnical Reliability, ASCE, Denver, Colorado, July 1992.
- "Ductility and Strength of Bridge Pier Walls under Cyclic Lateral Loading," M.A. Haroun, H.A. Haggag, G.C. Pardoen, R. Shepherd and R.P. Kazanjy, Proceedings of Fourth International Conference on Structural Failure and Product Liability, Vienna, Austria, July 1992.
- "Shear Strength of Pinned Columns," M.A. Haroun, G.C. Pardoen and R. Shepherd, Proceedings of the third NSF Workshop on Bridge Engineering Research in Progress, San Diego, California, November 1992, pp. 273–276.
- "Seismic Ductility and Strength of Pier Walls," M.A. Haroun, G.C. Pardoen and R. Shepherd, Proceedings of the third NSF Workshop on Bridge Engineering Research in Progress, San Diego, California, November 1992, pp. 285–288.
- "Modal Characteristics of Reinforced Concrete Pier Walls Before and After Cyclic Testing," M.A. Haroun, S.A. Mourad and N.H. Flynn, Proceedings of the 11th International Modal Analysis Conference, Orlando, Florida, Vol. 2, February 1993, pp. 1299–1302.
- "Retrofit of Bridge Pier Walls," M.A. Haroun, G.C. Pardoen and R. Shepherd, Proceedings of the Second Seismic Research Workshop, California Department of Transportation, Sacramento, March 1993.
- "Shear Strength of Pinned Columns," M.A. Haroun, G.C. Pardoen and R. Shepherd, Proceedings of the Second Seismic Research Workshop, California Department of Transportation, Sacramento, March 1993.
- "Testing of Pier Walls of Limited Ductility," M.A. Haroun, G.C. Pardoen and R. Shepherd, Proceedings of the Second Seismic Research Workshop, California Department of Transportation, Sacramento, March 1993.
- "Seismic Design Considerations for Uplifted Tanks," M.A. Haroun and A.A. El-Zeiny, Structural Engineering in Natural Hazards Mitigation, Proceedings of the Structures Congress, ASCE, Irvine, California, Vol. 1, April 1993, pp. 139–144.
- "Seismic Strengthening of Johnstown Tank in Lakeside, California," M.A. Haroun, M.R. Pierepiekarz, J.G. Shipp and M. Brown, Structural Engineering in Natural Hazards Mitigation, Proceedings of the Structures Congress, ASCE, Irvine, California, Vol. 1, April 1993, pp. 634–639.
- "Seismic Behavior and Retrofit of Reinforced Concrete Highway Bridge Components," M.A. Haroun, Invited Keynote Paper, Proceedings of the Eighth Latin American Conference on Earthquake Engineering, Vol. 1, Mérida, Venezuela, July 1993, pp. 113–126.
- "Assessment of Seismic Safety of Unanchored Oil Storage Tanks," M.A. Haroun, W. Abou-Izzeddine and N. Mode, Proceedings of the Eighth Latin American Conference on Earthquake Engineering, Vol. 2, Mérida, Venezuela, July 1993, pp. E51-E59.
- "Fragility Curves for Three-Dimensional Towers Supporting Elevated Vessels," M.A. Haroun and H.I. Mobarek, Proceedings of Flow-Induced Vibration and Fluid-Structure Interaction, Pressure Vessels and Piping Conference, ASME, Vol. 258, Denver, Colorado, July 1993, pp. 217–221.
- "Nonlinear Seismic Analyses of Liquid Filled Tanks," M.A. Haroun, Proceedings of Flow-Induced Vibration and Fluid-Structure Interaction, Pressure Vessels and Piping Conference, ASME, Vol. 258, Denver, Colorado, July 1993, pp. 209–216.
- "Fragility Curves for Elevated Vessels," M.A. Haroun and H.I. Mobarek, Presented at the 12th International Conference on Structural Mechanics in Reactor Technology (SMIRT), Stuttgart, Germany, August 1993.
- "Assessment of Seismic Retrofit Techniques for Bridge Pier Walls," S.A. Mourad, M.A. Haroun and G.C. Pardoen, Proceedings of the Fifth International Conference on Civil and Structural Engineering Computing, Developments in Structural Engineering Computing, Edinburgh, Scotland, August 1993, pp. 365–369.
- "Seismic Strengthening of Johnstown Tank in Lakeside, California," M.A. Haroun, M.R. Pierepiekarz, J.G. Shipp and M. Brown, Proceedings of the 62nd Annual Convention, Structural Engineers Association of California, Scottsdale, Arizona, September 1993, pp. 171–175.
- "Seismic Qualification of Tanks for Storage of Liquefied Natural Gas," M.A. Haroun, A.A. El-Zeiny and H. Bhatia, Proceedings of the First Egyptian Conference on Earthquake Engineering, Hurghada, Egypt, December 1993, pp. 665–674.
- "Enhancement of the Seismic Design of Bridge Supporting Elements Through Half-Scale Testing," M.A. Haroun, H.A. Haggag and S.A. Mourad, Proceedings of the First Egyptian Conference on Earthquake Engineering, Hurghada, Egypt, December 1993, pp. 613–622.
- "Seismic Retrofit of Reinforced Concrete Tilt-Up Wall-Foundation Connections," M.A. Haroun, A.E. Salama and S.I. Hilmy, Proceedings of the First Egyptian Conf. on Earthquake Engineering, Hurghada, Egypt, December 1993, pp. 527–536.
- "Reliability Analysis of Elevated Tank-Tower System under Earthquake Excitations," M.A. Haroun and H.I. Mobarek, Proceedings of the First Egyptian Conf. on Earthquake Engineering, Hurghada, Egypt, December 1993, pp. 683–692.
- "Seismic Strengthening of Reinforced Concrete Bridge Pier Walls Designed to Old Standards," M.A. Haroun, G.C. Pardoen and R. Shepherd, Proceedings of the Second US-Japan Workshop on Seismic Retrofit of Bridges, Berkeley, California, January 1994.
- "Cyclic Tests of Reinforced Concrete Tilt-Up Walls," M.A. Haroun, A.E. Salama and S.I. Hilmy, Proceedings of the 12th International Modal Analysis Conference, Vol. II, Honolulu, Hawaii, January 1994, pp. 1806–1812.
- "Correlation of Computed and Observed Large-Amplitude Liquid-Sloshing Under Sinusoidal Base Excitation," M.A. Haroun and W. Chen, Proceedings of the 12th International Modal Analysis Conference, Vol. II, Honolulu, Hawaii, January 1994, pp. 1834–1840.
- "Testing of Reduced-Scale Bridge Components for Seismic Qualification," M.A. Haroun, G.C. Pardoen, R. Shepherd, H.A. Haggag and R.P. Kazanjy, Proceedings of the 12th International Modal Analysis Conference, Vol. II, Honolulu, Hawaii, January 1994, pp. 1813–1819.
- "Models for Evaluating the Ductility of Reinforced Concrete Bridge Pier Walls," M.A. Haroun and H.A. Haggag, Proceedings of 10th US-Japan Workshop on Bridge Engineering Research, Vol. II, Lake Tahoe, California, May 1994, pp. 423–434.
- "Hybrid Liquid Column Dampers for Suppression of Environmentally-Induced Vibrations in Tall Buildings," M.A. Haroun, J.A. Pires and A.Y. Won, Proceedings of Third Conference on Tall Buildings in Seismic Regions, Los Angeles, May 1994.
- "Seismic Design Guidelines for Liquefied Natural Gas Tanks," M.A. Haroun, A.A. El-Zeiny and H. Bhatia, Proceedings of the Pressure Vessels and Piping Conference, Vol. 272, ASME, Minneapolis, Minnesota, June 1994, pp. 43–50.
- "Comparative Evaluation of Seismic Design Standards of Oil Storage Tanks," M.A. Haroun, W. Abou-Izzeddine and N. Mode, Proceedings of the Pressure Vessels and Piping Conf., Vol. 272, ASME, Minneapolis, Minnesota, June 1994, pp. 51–58.
- "Assessment of Cross-ties Performance in Bridge Pier Walls of Modern Design," M.A. Haroun, G.C. Pardoen, R. Shepherd and H.A. Haggag, Proceedings of the Third Caltrans Seismic Research Workshop, Sacramento, June 1994.
- "Optimal Seismic Retrofit of Bridge Pier Walls Built to Old Standards," M.A. Haroun, G.C. Pardoen, R. Shepherd and H.A. Haggag, Proceedings of the Third Caltrans Seismic Research Workshop, Sacramento, June 1994.
- "Experimental Evaluation of the Shear Friction Resistance of Pinned Columns," M.A. Haroun, G.C. Pardoen, R. Shepherd and A.E. Salama, Proceedings of the Third Caltrans Seismic Research Workshop, Sacramento, June 1994.
- "Fragility Curves for Elevated Tanks," M.A. Haroun and H.I. Mobarek, Proceedings of Fifth U.S. National Conference on Earthquake Engineering, Vol. IV, EERI, Chicago, Illinois, July 1994, pp. 447–456.
- "Large-Amplitude Sloshing in Rectangular Tanks Under Earthquake Motion," M.A. Haroun and W. Chen, Proceedings of Fifth U.S. National Conference on Earthquake Engineering, Vol. IV, EERI, Chicago, Illinois, July 1994, pp. 529–538.
- "Retrofit of Wall-Foundation Connections of Precast R/C Tilt-Up Walls," M.A. Haroun, A.E. Salama and S.I. Hilmy, Proceedings of Fifth U.S. National Conf. on Earthquake Engineering, Vol. III, EERI, Chicago, Illinois, July 1994, pp. 737–746.
- "Behavior of Bridge Pier Walls of Modern Design Under Cyclic Loads," H.A. Haggag, M.A. Haroun, G.C. Pardoen and R. Shepherd, Proceedings of Fifth U.S. National Conference on Earthquake Engineering, Vol. I, EERI, Chicago, Illinois, July 1994, pp. 469–478.
- "Retrofit Strategies for Bridge Pier Walls," M.A. Haroun, G.C. Pardoen, R. Shepherd and H.A. Haggag, Proceedings of the Fifth U.S. National Conference on Earthquake Engineering, Vol. III, EERI, Chicago, Illinois, July 1994, pp. 819–828.
- "Active Orifice Control in Hybrid Liquid Column Dampers," M.A. Haroun, J.A. Pires and A.Y. Won, Proceedings of First World Conference on Structural Control, Vol. 3, Pasadena, California, August 1994, pp. FA1 69–78.
- "Computational Methods for the Nonlinear Analysis of Fluid Structure Systems," M.A. Haroun, presented at the 2nd International Conference on Computational Structures Technology, Athens, Greece, August 1994.
- "Dynamic Coupling between Flexible Tanks and Seismically-Induced Nonlinear Liquid Sloshing," W. Chen and M.A. Haroun, Proceedings of the Forum on Fluid Transients, ASME International Mechanical Engineering Congress and Exposition, Chicago, Illinois, November 1994.
- "Observations and Lessons Learned from the 1994 Northridge Earthquake," M.A. Haroun and H. Bhatia, Proceedings of Cairo Earthquake Engineering Symposium on Seismic Risk Assessment, Cairo, Egypt, December 1994, pp. 483–494.
- "Simulation of Large Amplitude Liquid Sloshing in Containers," M.A. Haroun and W. Chen, Proceedings of International Conference on Computational Methods in Structural and Geotechnical Engineering, Vol. IV, Hong Kong, December 1994, pp. 1232–1237.
- "Performance Assessment of Tuned Liquid Column Dampers under Random Seismic Loading," A.Y. Won, J.A. Pires and M.A. Haroun, Proceedings of the 3rd International Conference on Stochastic Structural Dynamics, San Juan, Puerto Rico, January 1995, pp. 6.18-6.33.
- "Effectiveness of Hybrid Liquid Column Dampers for Suppressing Structural Vibrations," M.A. Haroun, J.A. Pires and A.Y. Won, Proceedings of the 13th International Modal Analysis Conference, Vol. I, Nashville, Tennessee, February 1995, pp. 525–531.
- "Verification Tests of the Shear Capacity of Pinned Column-Caisson Connections," M.A. Haroun, G.C. Pardoen and A.E. Salama, Proceedings of the 13th International Modal Analysis Conference, Vol. II, Nashville, Tennessee, February 1995, pp. 1178–1184.
- "Dynamic Interaction of an Uplifted Beam with the Supporting Soil," M.A. Haroun and A.A. El-Zeiny, Proceedings of the Third International Conference on Recent Advances in Geotechnical Earthquake Engineering and Soil Dynamics, Vol. I, St. Louis, Missouri, April 1995, pp. 409–412.
- "Large Amplitude Settlements of Oil Storage Tanks," M.A. Haroun, Y. Wang, W. Abou-Izzeddine and N. Mode, Proceedings of the Third International Conference on Recent Advances in Geotechnical Earthquake Engineering and Soil Dynamics, Vol. III, St. Louis, Missouri, April 1995, pp. 1223–1226.
- "Performance of Liquid Storage Tanks During the 1994 Northridge Earthquake," M.A. Haroun, presented at the Seventh Canadian Conference on Earthquake Engineering, Montreal, Canada, June 1995.
- "Seismic Design of Liquid Storage Tanks - From Research to Practice," M.A. Haroun, Workshop on Research Transformed into Practice, National Science Foundation, Crystal City, Virginia, June 1995.
- "Nonlinear Transient Response of Unanchored Liquid Storage Tanks," M.A. Haroun and A.A. El-Zeiny, Fluid Sloshing and Fluid-Structure Interaction, Proceedings of the Pressure Vessels and Piping Conference, ASME, Vol. 314, Honolulu, Hawaii, July 1995, pp. 35–41.
- "Enhanced Seismic Design of Reinforced Concrete Bridge Supporting Elements," M.A. Haroun, H.A. Haggag and A.E. Salama, Proceedings of the Fourth US Conference on Lifeline Earthquake Engineering, San Francisco, California, August 1995, pp. 439–446.
- "Analysis of Tank Damage During the 1994 Northridge Earthquake," M.A. Haroun and H. Bhatia, Proceedings of the Fourth US Conference on Lifeline Earthquake Engineering, San Francisco, California, August 1995, pp. 763–770.
- "Simulation of Dynamic Behavior of Unanchored Tanks," M.A. Haroun and A.A. El-Zeiny, Proceedings of the 13th International Conference on Structural Mechanics in Reactor Technology, Vol. III, Porto Alegre, Brazil, August 1995, pp. 341–346.
- "Nonlinear Computational Methods for Fluid-Structure Interaction," M.A. Haroun, Developments in Computational Techniques for Civil Engineering, Proceedings of the Sixth International Conference on Civil and Structural Engineering Computing, Cambridge, England, August 1995, pp. 335–341.
- "Seismic Analysis of Tanks: From Housner's Pioneering Study to Today's State of Knowledge," M.A. Haroun, Invited Presentation at the 1st Symposium of the California Universities for Research in Earthquake Engineering, Pasadena, California, October 1995.
- "Assessment of Seismic Code Provisions for Liquid Storage Tanks," M.A. Haroun, Invited Keynote Paper, Second Cairo Earthquake Engineering Symposium on Seismic Design Codes, Cairo, Egypt, December 1995.
- "Experimental Testing of Reinforced Concrete Elements for Seismic Qualification and Retrofit," Invited Keynote Lecture, Proceedings of the Cairo First International Conference on Concrete Structures, Vol. I, Cairo, Egypt, January 1996, pp. 11–23.
- "Prediction of Displacement Ductility of Reinforced Concrete Bridge Pier Walls," M.A. Haroun and H.A. Haggag, Proceedings of the Cairo First International Conference on Concrete Structures, Vol. I, Cairo, Egypt, January 1996, pp. 31–40.
- "Cyclic Testing of As Built and Enhanced Full-Scale Masonry-Infilled Reinforced Concrete Frames," M.A. Haroun, E.H. Ghoneam and A.E. Salama, Proceedings of the Big Cities World Conference on Natural Disasters Mitigation, Cairo, Egypt, January 1996.
- "Nonlinear Finite Element Analysis of Masonry-Infilled Reinforced Concrete Frames," M.A. Haroun and E.H. Ghoneam, Proceedings of the 11th Engineering Mechanics Conference, ASCE, Vol. 2, Fort Lauderdale, Florida, May 1996, pp. 1022–1025.
- "Suppression of Environmentally-Induced Vibrations in Tall Buildings by Hybrid Liquid Column Dampers," M.A. Haroun, J.A. Pires and A.Y. Won, International Journal of the Structural Design of Tall Buildings, Vol. 5, 1996, pp. 45–54.
- "Repair of Damaged Pier Walls," M.A. Haroun, G.C. Pardoen, H. Bhatia, S. Shahi, and R.P. Kazanjy, Proceedings of the Fourth National Workshop on Bridge Research in Progress, Buffalo, New York, June 1996, pp. 107–112.
- "Seismic Strengthening of Masonry-Infilled Frames by Fiber Composite," M.A. Haroun, E.H. Ghoneam and A.E. Salama, Advanced Composite Materials - State-of-the-Art Report, Proceedings of the First Middle East Workshop on Structural Composites, Sharm El-Sheikh, Egypt, June 1996, pp. 111–126.
- "Repair Schemes for Damaged Pier Walls," M.A. Haroun, G.C. Pardoen, H. Bhatia, S. Shahi, and R.P. Kazanjy, Proceedings of the Fourth Caltrans Seismic Research Workshop, California Department of Transportation, Sacramento, July 1996.
- "Large Amplitude Liquid Sloshing in Seismically Excited Tanks," W. Chen, M.A. Haroun and F. Liu, International Journal of Earthquake Engineering and Structural Dynamics, Vol. 25, July 1996, pp. 653–669.
- "Computational Analysis of Large-Amplitude Settlement and Shell Ovalization of Oil Tanks," M.A. Haroun, Y. Wang and M. Martinez, Advances in Computational Techniques for Structural Engineering, Third International Conf. on Computational Structures Technology, Budapest, Hungary, August 1996, pp. 165–170.
- "Finite Element Analysis for Seismic Damage Prediction of a Retrofitted Masonry Building," M.A. Haroun, H. Bhatia and E.H. Ghoneam, Advances in Finite Element Technology, Third International Conf. on Computational Structures Technology, Budapest, Hungary, August 1996, pp. 357–361.
- "A Computational Technique for the Nonlinear Dynamic Analysis of Unanchored Liquid Storage Tanks," M.A. Haroun and A.A. El-Zeiny, Proceedings of the Third Asian-Pacific Conference on Computational Mechanics, Vol. 2, Seoul, Korea, September 1996, pp. 1007–1012.
- "Nonlinear Computational Analysis of Laterally-Loaded Masonry-Infilled Reinforced Concrete Frames," M.A. Haroun and E.H. Ghoneam, Proceedings of the Third Asian-Pacific Conference on Computational Mechanics, Vol. 2, Seoul, Korea, September 1996, pp. 1239–1244.
- "Stochastic Seismic Performance Evaluation of Tuned Liquid Column Dampers," A.Y. Won, J.A. Pires and M.A. Haroun, International Journal of Earthquake Engineering and Structural Dynamics, Vol. 25, October 1996, pp. 1259–1274.
- "In-Plane Cyclic Shear Testing of Full-Scale Innovative Structural Wall System," M.A. Haroun and C.V. Yland, Proceedings of the 15th International Modal Analysis Conference, Vol. 2, Orlando, Florida, February 1997, pp. 1643–1649.
- "Seismic Performance Testing of Masonry-Infilled Frames Retrofitted by Fiber Composite," M.A. Haroun and E.H. Ghoneam, Proceedings of the 15th International Modal Analysis Conference, Vol. 2, Orlando, February 1997, pp. 1650–1656.
- "Seismic Characterization of Structural Wall Systems," M.A. Haroun, State-of-the-Art Paper, Proceedings of the International Conference on Rehabilitation and Development of Civil Engineering Infrastructure Systems, Vol. II, Beirut, Lebanon, June 1997, pp. 1348–1359.
- "Testing Bridge Columns Enhanced by Fiber Composite Jackets," M.A. Haroun, M.Q. Feng, H. Bhatia, M. Sultan, T. Hoshijima, and Y. Kobatake, Recent Advances in Bridge Engineering, Proceedings of US-Canada-Europe Workshop on Bridge Engineering, Zurich, Switzerland, July 1997, pp. 136–143.
- "Numerical Simulation of Elephant-Foot Buckling of Seismically-Excited Steel Cylindrical Tanks," M.A. Haroun and H. Bhatia, Proceedings of the Pressure Vessels and Piping Conference, ASME, Vol. 355, Orlando, Florida, July 1997, pp. 333–340.
- "Characterization of Observed Uplift and Buckling of an Unanchored Tank During the Northridge Earthquake," M.A. Haroun, H.A. Bhatia and A.A. El-Zeiny, Proceedings of the NEHRP Conference on Research on the Northridge, California Earthquake of January 17, 1994, Vol. III-B - Engineering, Los Angeles, California, August 1997, pp. 765–772.
- "Lap Splice and Shear Enhancements in Composite-Jacketed Bridge Columns," M.A. Haroun and M.Q. Feng, Proceedings of the Thirteenth US-Japan Workshop on Bridge Engineering, Tsukuba City, Japan, October 1997, pp. 189–200.
- "Experimental Study on RC Bridge Columns Retrofitted Using Fiber Composite Materials," M.A. Haroun, M.Q. Feng, H. Bhatia, M. Sultan, T. Hoshijima, and Y. Kobatake, Proceedings of 5th International Conference on Structural Failure, Durability and Retrofitting, Singapore, November 1997, pp. 324–332.
- "Cyclic Qualification Testing of Jacketed Bridge Columns in Flexure and Shear," M.A. Haroun, M.Q. Feng, H. Bhatia, and M. Sultan, Proceedings of 16th International Modal Analysis Conference, Vol. II, Santa Barbara, California, February 1998, pp. 1770–1776.
- "Comparative Testing of Full and Half Scale Models of Bridge Pier Walls," M.A. Haroun, G.C. Pardoen, H. Bhatia, and S. Shahi, Proceedings of 16th International Modal Analysis Conference, Vol. II, Santa Barbara, California, February 1998, pp. 1777–1783.
- "Mitigation of Earthquake Risk on Structures: Accomplishments and Dreams," M.A. Haroun, Invited Keynote Paper, the International Conference on Civil Engineering, Helwan University, Cairo, Egypt, March 1998.
- "Ductility Enhancement in Composite-Jacketed Bridge Columns," M.A. Haroun, Proceedings of the International Conference on Civil Engineering, Vol. II, Helwan University, Cairo, Egypt, March 1998, pp. 389–399.
- "Alternative Placements of Fiber Glass Layers for Seismic Strengthening of Masonry-Infilled Frames," M.A. Haroun, H.A. Haggag, E.H. Ghoneam, and Y.S. Korany, Proceedings of the International Conference on Civil Engineering, Vol. II, Helwan University, Cairo, Egypt, March 1998, pp. 182–189.
- "Cyclic Testing of Composite-Jacketed Bridge Columns," M.A. Haroun and M.Q. Feng, Proceedings of the 5th Caltrans Seismic Research Workshop, California Department of Transportation, Sacramento, California, June 1998.
- "Seismic Enhancement of Structures by Advanced Composite Materials," M.A. Haroun, Proceedings of Fifth International Conference on Composites Engineering, ICCE/5, Las Vegas, Nevada, July 1998, pp. 1031–1032.
- "Implementation of Analysis Advancements in the Seismic Qualification of Unanchored Tanks in Critical Facilities," M.A. Haroun and W.E. Gates, Technology in Reactor Safety, Fluid-Structure Interaction, Sloshing, and Natural Hazards Engineering, Pressure Vessels and Piping Conference, Vol. 366, ASME, San Diego, California, July 1998, pp. 197–203.
- "Seismic Retrofit of Reinforced Concrete Columns and Unreinforced Masonry-Infilled Walls by Advanced Composite Materials," M.A. Haroun, Proceedings of Conference on State-of-the-Art Techniques for Seismic Repair and Rehabilitation of Structures, Fullerton, November 1998, pp. 91–100.
- "Application of Advanced Composite Materials for Seismic Performance Enhancement of Bridge Columns," M.A. Haroun, Invited Keynote Lecture, Proceedings of the Second Middle East Symposium on Structural Composites for Infrastructure Applications, Hurghada, Egypt, April 1999, pp. 469–482.
- "Qualification Testing of New Innovative Structural Wall System," M.A. Haroun, C.V. Yland, and H.M. Elsanadedy, Invited Keynote Lecture, Sixth International Exhibition and Conference for Building and Construction, Inter Build 99, Cairo, Egypt, June 1999.
- "Enhancement of the Seismic Buckling Capacity of Liquid-Filled Shells," M.A. Haroun and H. Bhatia, Proceedings of the Pressure Vessels and Piping Conference, ASME, Vol. 394, Boston, Massachusetts, August 1999, pp. 185–190.
- "Implications of Recent Nonlinear Analyses on Seismic Standards of Liquid Storage Tanks," M.A. Haroun, Optimizing Post-Earthquake Lifeline System Reliability, TCLEE Monograph No. 16, ASCE, August 1999, pp. 988–997.
- "Structural Performance Testing of Composite-Jacketed Bridge Columns Under Cyclic Loading," M.A. Haroun and M.Q. Feng, Optimizing Post-Earthquake Lifeline System Reliability, TCLEE Monograph No. 16, ASCE, August 1999, pp. 998–1007.
- "Nonlinear Computational Model for Soil-Pile Interaction with Gap Formation," M.A. Haroun and H.M. Nofal, Developments in Analysis and Design using Finite Element Methods, Civil-Comp Press, Oxford, September 1999, pp. 261–269.
- "Finite Element Modeling of Structural Reinforced Concrete Grid Walls," M.A. Haroun, C.V. Yland, and H.M. Elsanadedy, Developments in Analysis and Design Using Finite Element Methods, Proceedings of the Seventh International Conference on Civil and Structural Engineering Computing, Oxford, England, pp. 155–159.
- "Experimental and Numerical Analysis of Two-way Concrete Slabs Repaired with Polymer Composites," A.S. Mosallam, M.A. Haroun, H.M. Elsanadedy, and K. Gillette, proceedings of the ACUN-2, the International Composites Conference, University of New South Wales, Sydney Australia, pp. 185–190.
- "Structural Behavior of Repaired Pier Walls," M. Haroun, G. Pardoen, H. Bhatia, S. Shahi, and R. Kazanjy, Proceedings of the Structural Journal, American Concrete Institute, Vol. 97, No. 2, March–April 2000, 259–267.
- "Upgrade of R/C Two-way Slab with Carbon/Epoxy Laminates," A.S. Mosallam, T. Lancey, J. Kreiner, M.A. Haroun, and H.M. Elsanadedy, Proceedings of the 2nd Conference on Seismic Repair & Rehabilitation of Structures (SRRS2), Fullerton, California, USA, pp. 119–130.
- "Prediction of Cyclic Performance of Composite-Jacketed Squat Reinforced Concrete Bridge Columns," M.A. Haroun and H.M. Elsanadedy, Proceedings of the 2nd Conference on Seismic Repair & Rehabilitation of Structures (SRRS2), Fullerton, California, USA, pp. 108–118.
- "Seismic Retrofit of Reinforced Concrete Columns Using FRP Composite Laminates," M. Haroun, M. Feng, M. Youssef, and A. Mosallam, Innovative Systems for Seismic Repair and Rehabilitation of Structures, SRRS2, Fullerton, March 2000, pp. 85–95.
- "Experimental Study on RC Bridge Columns Retrofitted Using Fiber Composite Materials," M.N. Youssef, M. Haroun, M. Feng, and A. Mosallam, Proceedings of the 45th International SAMPE Symposium and Exhibition, Vol. 45, Long Beach, California, May 2000, pp. 1803–1812.
- "Repair and Upgrade of R/C Two-way Slab with Carbon/Epoxy Laminates," M.A. Haroun, A.S. Mosallam, H.M. Elsanadedy, and K. Gillette, Proceedings of the 45th International SAMPE Symposium and Exhibition, Vol. 45, Long Beach, California, USA, pp. 1813–1822.
- "Advanced Retrofit of Reinforced Concrete Bridge Columns for Earthquake Resistance," M.A. Haroun, Invited Keynote Paper, Proceedings of the Eighth Arab Conference on Structural Engineering, Cairo, Egypt, October 2000, pp. 41–50.
- "A Model for Predicting the Behavior of Bridge Columns with Lap-Spliced Reinforcement under Lateral Loading," M.A. Haroun and H.M. Elsanadedy, Proceedings of ACUN-3, the International Conference on Technology Convergence in Composite Application, University of New South Wales, Sydney, Australia, February 2001, pp. 561–568.
- "Qualification Tests for Innovative Seismic Retrofit and Design of Structural Elements," M.A. Haroun, Invited Keynote Paper, Fourth Alexandria International Conference on Structural and Geotechnical Engineering, Alexandria, Egypt, April 2001.
- "Experimental Investigation on the Out-of-Plane Response of Unreinforced Brick Walls Retrofitted with FRP Composites," A. Mosallam, M. Haroun, T. Almusallam, and S. Faraig, Proceedings of the 46th International SAMPE Symposium, Long Beach, California, May 2001.
- "Innovative Applications of Composite Materials for Retrofit, Repair, and Construction of the Infrastructure," M.A. Haroun, Invited Keynote Paper, Third Middle East Symposium on Structural Composites for Infrastructure Applications, Cairo, Egypt, May 2001.
- "Cyclic Testing of Column Bents Strengthened by Infill Walls," M.A. Haroun, A. Abdel-Kareem, H. Elsanadedy, M. Elbahar, A.S. Mosallam, M. Yashinsky, and C. Whitten, Proceedings of 6th Caltrans Seismic Research Workshop, 8 pages, June 2001 (CD).
- "Repair and Structural Upgrade of R/C Columns Using Polymeric Composite Laminates," M.A. Haroun, H.M. Elsanadedy, C.V. Yland, and A.S. Mosallam, Proceedings of the Eleventh International Offshore and Polar Engineering Conference, Stavanger, Norway, June 2001, pp. 698–702.
- "Repair and Rehabilitation of Reinforced and Unreinforced Concrete Slabs with Polymer Composites," A.S. Mosallam, M.A. Haroun, and K.M. Mosalam, Invited Keynote Paper, Proceedings of the 9th International Conference on Structural Faults and Repair, London, England, 14 pages, July 2001 (CD).
- "Analytical Modeling of Composite-Jacketed Reinforced Concrete Bridge Columns," M.A. Haroun, and H.M. Elsanadedy, Presented at the 9th International Conference on Structural Faults and Repair, London, England, and Posted on the Web as Paper of the Month, 16 pages, July 2001.
- "Theoretical and Experimental Study on Behavior of Unreinforced Brick Walls Retrofitted with Composites," A.S. Mosallam, M.A. Haroun, H.M. Elsanadedy, M.R. Elbahar, and A.H. Abdel-Kareem, Proceedings of the 9th International Conference on Structural Faults and Repair, London, UK, July 2001 (CD).
- "Experimental Investigation of Seismic Repair and Retrofit of Bridge Columns by Composite Jackets," M.A. Haroun, A.S. Mosallam, M.Q. Feng, and H.M. Elsanadedy, Proceedings of the International Conference on FRP Composites in Civil Engineering, CICE, Hong Kong, December 2001, pp. 839–848.
- "Numerical Models for Composite-Jacketed Reinforced Concrete Bridge Columns," M.A. Haroun and H.M. Elsanadedy, Proceedings of the International Conference on FRP Composites in Civil Engineering, CICE, Hong Kong, December 2001, pp. 849–858.
- "Experimental and Analytical Evaluation of All-Composite Highway Bridge Deck," M.A. Haroun, A.S. Mosallam, and F. Abdi, Proceedings of the International Conference on Advanced Polymer Composites for Structural Applications in Construction, ACIC, University of Southampton, Southampton, United Kingdom, April 2002, pp. 397–404.
- "Structural Evaluation of All-Composite Deck for Schuyler Heim Bridge," A.S. Mosallam, M.A. Haroun. J. Kreiner, C. Dumlao, and F. Abdi, Proceedings of the 47th International SAMPE Symposium, Long Beach, California, May 2002, pp. 667–679.
- "Design Recommendations for Seismic Retrofit of Shear-Deficient Reinforced Concrete Bridge Columns with Advanced Composite Jackets," H.M. Elsanadedy, M.A. Haroun, and A.E. Salama, Proceedings of the International Bridge Conference, IBC-02-24, 8 pages, Pittsburgh, June 2002 (CD).
- "Service and Ultimate Behavior of the Schuyler Heim Bridge Hybrid Composite Deck," A.S. Mosallam, M.A. Haroun, A.H. Abdel-Kareem, H.M. Elsanadedy, M.R. Elbahar, and F. Abdi, Invited Keynote Paper, Proceedings of the 9th International Conference on Composite Engineering, ICCE/9, San Diego, July 2002.
- "Criteria for Seismic Retrofit Design of Deficient RC Bridge Columns by FRP Jackets," H.M. Elsanadedy, M.A. Haroun, and A.S. Mosallam, Proceedings of the 9th International Conference on Composite Engineering, ICCE/9, San Diego, July 2002.
- "Analysis, Testing, and Design Methodology for Seismic Retrofit of Composite-Jacketed Circular and Rectangular Reinforced Concrete Columns," M.A. Haroun, and H.M. Elsanadedy, Invited Keynote Paper, Fourth International Conference on Composite Systems, Sydney, Australia, July 2002.
- "Design Evaluation of Seismically Retrofitted Reinforced Concrete Bridge Column Bents by Infill Walls," M.A. Haroun, H.M. Elsanadedy, M.R. Elbahar, and A.S. Mosallam, Proceedings of the Seventh US National Conference on Earthquake Engineering, EERI, Boston, July 2002.
- "Composite Jackets for the Seismic Retrofit and Repair of Bridge Columns," M.A. Haroun, M.Q. Feng, H.M. Elsanadedy, and A.S. Mosallam, Proceedings of the Seventh US National Conference on Earthquake Engineering, EERI, Boston, July 2002.
- "Numerical Models for Composite-Jacketed Reinforced Concrete Bridge Columns," M.A. Haroun and H.M. Elsanadedy, Journal of Reinforced Plastics and Composites, Vol. 22, No. 13, 2003, pp. 1203 – 1219.
- "Experimental Investigation of Seismic Repair and Retrofit of Bridge Columns by Composite Jackets," M.A. Haroun, A.S. Mosallam, M.Q. Feng, and H.M. Elsanadedy, Journal of Reinforced Plastics and Composites, Vol. 22, No. 14, 2003, pp. 1243–1268.
- "Assessment of Factors Affecting Formation of Elephant Foot Bulges in Seismically-Excited Steel Storage Tanks," M.A. Haroun and M.S. Al-Kashif, Presented at the Second International Conference on Structural Engineering, Mechanics, and Computation (SEMC 2004), Cape Town, South Africa, July 2004.
- "Ductility Enhancement Versus Strength Enhancement for Seismic Retrofit of Bridge Column Bents," M.A. Haroun, A.S. Mosallam, H.M. Elsanadedy, and M.R. Elbahar, Keynote Paper, Proceedings of the International Conference on Future Vision and Challenges for Urban Development, Housing and Building Research Center, Cairo, Egypt, December 2004, pp. 109 – 123.
- "Progressive Failure Analysis of a Composite Army Bridge," A.S. Mosallam, M.A. Haroun, R. Iyer, and F. Abdi, Housing and Building Research Center HBRC Journal, Vol. 1, December 2004, pp. 101–112. Also presented at the International Conference on Future Vision and Challenges for Urban Development, Cairo, Egypt, December 2004 (on CD).
- "Seismic Design Criteria for Circular Lap-Spliced Reinforced Concrete Bridge Columns Retrofitted with Fiber Reinforced Polymer Jackets," H.M. Elsanadedy and M.A. Haroun, Journal of Structural Engineering, American Concrete Institute, Vol. 102, No. 3, May–June 2005, pp. 354–362.
- "Fundamental Natural Period of Earthquake Resistant RC Buildings with Shear Wall Systems," M.A. Haroun, M.N. Abdel Salam, and A.M. Ismail, Proceedings of the Eleventh International Colloquium on Structural and Geotechnical Engineering, Cairo, Egypt, May 2005 (on CD).
- "Innovative Use of Hybrid Fiber Reinforced Polymers for Mitigating Seismic Effects on Steel Liquid Storage Tanks," M.A. Haroun, Distinguished Paper, Proceedings of the Fourth Middle East Symposium on Structural Composites for Infrastructure Applications, Alexandria, Egypt, May 2005, pp. 90–101.
- "Methodology for Design of Earthquake Resistant Steel Liquid Storage Tanks," M.A. Haroun and M.A. Al-Kashif, Proceedings of the Fifth International Conference on Earthquake Resistant Engineering Structures, ERES, Skiathos, Greece, May 2005, pp. 699–708.
- "Seismic Design Guidelines for Squat Composite-Jacketed Circular and Rectangular Reinforced Concrete Columns," H.M. Elsanadedy and M.A. Haroun, Journal of Structural Engineering, American Concrete Institute, Vol. 102, No. 4, July–August 2005, pp. 505–514.
- "Mitigation of Elephant-Foot Bulge Formation in Seismically-Excited Steel Storage Tanks," M.A. Haroun, Proceedings of the 18th International Conference on Structural Mechanics in Reactor Technology, SMiRT 18, Beijing, China, August 2005, pp. 3664–3675.
- "Cyclic In-Plane Shear of Concrete Masonry Walls Strengthened by FRP Laminates," M.A. Haroun, A.S. Mosallam, and K.H. Allam, Proceedings of the Seventh International Symposium on Fiber Reinforced Polymers for Reinforced Concrete Structures, FRPRCS7, Kansas City, November 2005, pp. 327–339.
- "Behavior of Cyclically Loaded Squat Reinforced Concrete Bridge Columns Upgraded with Advanced Composite-Material Jackets," M.A. Haroun and H.M. Elsanadedy, Journal of Bridge Engineering, ASCE, Vol. 10, No. 6, November/December, pp. 741–748.
- "Fiber-Reinforced Plastic Jackets for Ductility Enhancement of Reinforced Concrete Bridge Columns with Poor Lap Splice Detailing," M.A. Haroun and H.M. Elsanadedy, Journal of Bridge Engineering, ASCE, Vol. 10, No. 6, November/December, pp. 749–757.
- "Advances in Remote Sensing and Nondestructive Evaluation of Bridges and Structures," A.S. Mosallam, M.Q. Feng, and M.A. Haroun, Proceedings of the International Conference on Bridge Management Systems – Monitoring, Assessment and Rehabilitation, Volume of Workshop Papers, HBRC, Cairo, Egypt, March 2006, pp. 105–115.
- "Advances in Rehabilitation and Safety Measures of Highway Bridges," M.A. Haroun and A.S. Mosallam, Keynote Paper, Proceedings of the International Conference on Bridge Management Systems – Monitoring, Assessment and Rehabilitation, HBRC, Cairo, Egypt, March 2006, pp. 69–80.
