= Saman Razavi =

Saman Razavi is a hydrologist and water resource engineer and a professor at the University of Saskatchewan in Canada. His research encompasses hydrological modelling, integrated human-water systems, sensitivity analysis, uncertainty quantification, and responsible AI in environment modelling. He is the recipient of Walter L. Huber Civil Engineering Research Prize from the American Society of Civil Engineers for his contributions to modelling and managing of complex human-water systems.

== Education ==
Saman Razavi received a bachelor's degree in civil engineering from Iran University of Science and Technology. He also earned a master's degree from Amirkabir University of Technology in civil and environmental engineering. In 2013, he completed his PhD in civil engineering from the University of Waterloo in Canada.

== Career and research ==
Razavi is a professor jointly appointed at the University of Saskatchewan School of Environment and Sustainability, Department of civil, geological and environmental engineering at the College of Engineering, and Global Institute of Water Security. He has also held academic appointments at the Australian National University (ANU) and the University of New South Wales.

His main research interests include hydrological modelling, water resources management, science-policy interface, and environmental systems.

He developed the Variogram Analysis of Response Surfaces (VARS) framework with Hoshin V. Gupta for global sensitivity analysis of complex models.His research also includes uncertainty quantification, surrogate modelling, and the integration of machine learning with process based environmental models. He has also contributed to integrated modelling of human-water systems to examine interactions between natural and human processes, water resources management, and flood and drought risks.

Razavi published a career commentary in Science, discussing the challenges faced by researchers whose first language is not English. In 2023, he also co-authored a book review with Ehsan Nabavi on the political and social dimensions of modelling highlighted by the Covid-19 pandemic.

Razavi led the Canadian contribution to an international study of flood and drought risk management published in Nature. The study examined 45 case studies worldwide to investigate the effects of various hazard conditions and risk management strategies on successive floods and drought.

== Awards and honours ==
Saman Razavi received the Water Security Research Excellence Award from the University of Saskatchewan's Global Institute of Water Security in 2018 and Canadian Geophysical Union's Young Scientist Award in 2019.

In 2020, he received the Early Career Research Excellence Award from the International Environment Modelling and Software Society. In 2023, a paper he co-authored received the American Society of Civil Engineer's Best Case Study Award. In 2024, he received Walter L. Huber Civil Engineering Research Prize from the American Society of Civil Engineers for his contributions to modelling and managing water-human systems. The same year he received the Australian Research Council Future Fellowship with A$1.03 million for research on water security amid global change and advancing in data and computing.
