= Walter L. Huber Civil Engineering Research Prize =

Walter L. Huber Civil Engineering Research Prizes
- Awarded for: Notable achievements in research related to all areas of civil engineering
- Presented by: American Society of Civil Engineers
- Website: http://www.asce.org/templates/award-detail.aspx?id=625

The Huber Civil Engineering Research Prize (Huber Award) is the highest level mid-career research award in all areas of civil engineering within United States. The award is annually given to individuals with notable achievements and contributions in research with respect to all disciplines of civil engineering. This award was first established by the American Society of Civil Engineers (ASCE) board of direction in 1946 and was given for the first time in 1949.

== History ==
Walter L. Huber (1883-1960) was an engineer, mountaineer, and conservationist. His research interests mostly were in the field of structural, hydroelectric, and irrigation projects. He also made some studies in the field of flood control, municipal water supplies, seismic forces and earthquake resistance.

The awards were authorized for the first time as annual awards by the ASCE board of direction to encourage research activities in civil engineering in July 1946. These prestigious annual awards were endowed in honor of Walter L. Huber, Past President of the ASCE, by his wife Alberta Reed Huber in 1964.

== Award condition ==
Based on the rules of the award, "the nominees must either be under 40 years of age or have worked no more than 12 years since receiving their doctoral degree at the time of nomination, whichever is less restrictive". Huber awardees are "generally younger than 45 and have demonstrated a level of achievement and excellence that bodes well for a long and fruitful career."

== Past recipients ==
The following list is based on the information provided by the ASCE.

Year	Recipients
2025	Gabriel Isaacman-VanWertz, Ben A. Leshchinsky, Jian Li, Ali Mostafavi, and Vitor E. Silva
2024	Ioannis A. Kougioumtzoglou, Zhen Leng, Hae Young Noh, Saman Razavi, and Xing Xie
2023	Sybil Derrible, Shihong Lin, Steve WaiChing Sun, and Thomas Wahl
2022	Amir H. Gandomi, Megan Konar, Carol C. Menassa, Gaurav N. Sant, Hao Wang
2021	Alexandros A. Taflanidis, Ning Lin
2020	Amir AghaKouchak, Michele Barbato, Eleni Chatzi, John D. Fortner, Zhiyong J. Ren
2019	Christopher P. Higgins, Sinan Keten, Dimitrios Lignos, Shaily Mahendra
2018	José E. Andrade, Jack W. Baker, Yuri Bazilevs, Mani Golparvar Fard, Zhen Jason He
2017	Amit Bhasin, Mikhail V. Chester, James K. Guest, Kaveh Madani, Jamie E. Padgett
2016	Alexandria B. Boehm, Claudia K. Gunsch, Amit Kanvinde, John S. McCartney, Narayanan Neithalath
2015	Scott J. Brandenberg, Faisal Hossain, Vineet R. Kamat, Yanfeng Ouyang, Ming Ye
2014	Alexandre M. Bayen, Larry A. Fahnestock, William J. Likos, Jerome P. Lynch, Enrique R. Vivoni
2013	Jason T. DeJong, Laurie A. Garrow, Jaehong Kim, Kimberly Kurtis, Patrick J. Lynett
2012	Christian Hellmich, Scott M. Olson, Santiago Pujol, Patrick M. Reed, Julie B. Zimmerman
2011	Ahmet H. Aydilek, Casey Brown, Eric M.V. Hoek, Ertugrul Taciroglu, W. Jason Weiss
2010	Kara M. Kockelman, Gustavo J. Parra-Montesinos, Ellen M. Rathje, Benjamin W. Schafer, Thorsten Wagener
2009	Tarek H. Abdoun, Lori Graham-Brady, Gregory V. Lowry, Srinivas Peeta, Eric B. Williamson,
2008	Arpad Horvath, Aaron I. Packman, Thanos Papanicolaou, Andrew W. Smyth, Jonathan P. Stewart
2007	Reginald Desroches, Sherif El-Tawil, Burcu H. Akinci, Feniosky Pena-Mora, Kenichi Soga
2006	Youssef M.A. Hashash, Khalid M. Mosalam, Roseanna M. Neupauer, Lutgarde M. Raskin, Brian L. Smith
2005	Henri P. Gavin, Joseph B. Hughes, Mathew G. Karlaftis, Franz-Josef Ulm and Paul K. Westerhoff,
2004	Rao S. Govindaraju, Glaucio H. Paulino, Rodrigo Salgado, Bozidar Stojadinovic, Chandra R. Bhat
2003	Marc A. Edwards, Barbara S. Minsker, Younane N Abousleiman, Juan M. Pestana-Nascimento, Jerome F. Hajjer
2002	Teresa B. Culver, Kevin E. Lansey, Ross W. Boulanger, Darcy M. Bullock, Iris D. Tommelein
2001	J. David Frost, Norman L. Jones, Nicos Makris, Charles S. Melching, David V. Rosowsky
2000	Craig H. Benson, Gregory G. Deierlein, Roger G. Ghanem, Rakesh K. Goel, Mary C. Hill
1999	Lawrence C. Bank, Maria Q. Feng, Kyle M. Rollins, Shahram Sarkani, Timothy D. Stark
1998	George Deodatis, W. Samuel Easterling, Marcelo H. Garcia, Miroslaw J. Skibniewski, Andrew T. Whittle
1997	Nicholas Jones, David Dzombak, Jiann-Wen Woody Ju, Bilal M. Ayyub, Jonathan D. Bray
1996	Jeffrey Russell, Menachem Elimelech, Steven L. Kramer, Raymond B. Seed, and Jay R. Lund
1995	Gregory L. Fenves, Dan A. Brown, Charles Shackelford, Richard M. Vogel, and Y.K. Tung
1994	Alexander Cheng, Filip C. Filippou, Richard J. Finno, Peter K. Kitanidis, Hugo A. Loaiciga
1993	Rafael Bras, Albert J. Clemmens, John P. Dempsey, William R. Knocke, Nicholas Sitar
1992	Medhat A. Haroun, James T. Kirby, Stelios Kyriakikes, Richard N. Palmer, Shuaib Haroon Ahmad
1991	Hayley H. Shen, John C. Crittenden, Sivaraj Shyam-Sunder, Robert H. Dodds, Jr., Gary Parker
1990	Dennis P. Lettenmaier, Jack Moehle, William J. Rasdorf, Bruce E. Rittmann, Stein Sture
1989	Ahmed M. Abdel-Ghaffar, Chris T. Hendrickson, Pol D. Spanos, Jery R. Stedinger, Michael K. Stenstrom
1988	Armen Der Kiureghian, Mark H. Houck, George Gazetas, Thomas D. O'Rourke
1987	Achintya Haldar, Yannis Dafalias, Joseph H. Sherrard, Jean-Louis Briaud, and Earl Downey Brill, Jr.
1986	William F. Maloney; Yi-Kwei Wen; Enrique Luco; Michael O'Neill; Keith W. Bedford
1985	David Darwin; Louis F. Cohn; Sterios A. Dendru; Jerald Lee Schnoor; Thomas M. Keinath
1984	Patrick J. Ryan; James K. Edzwald; Charles Linwood Vincent; Ross B. Corotis; and Erik H. Vanmarcke
1983	J.N. Reddy; Kenneth H. Stokoe; Gerhard H. Jirka; Stephen A. Mahin; and Gary S. Logsdon
1982	Ajaya K. Gupta; Raymond E. Levitt; Fred H. Kulhaw; and Adib K. Kanafani
1981	Douglas A. Haith; Gary C. Hart; Klaus-Jurgen Bathe; Joseph L. Hammack; and William F. Marcuson Iii
1980	Robert M. Clark; Vincent P. Drnevich; Clive L. Dym; Bruce R. Ellingwood; Boyd C. Paulson, Jr.
1979	Daniel W. Halpin; Ju-Chang Huang; Hon-Yim Ko; Ruh-Ming Li; And Keith D. Stolzenbach
1978	John D. Borcherding; Thomas J.R. Hughes; Tin-Kan Hung; James O. Jirsa; and Phillip L.-F. Liu
1977	Ted B. Belytschko; G. Wayne Clough; David H. Marks; James P. Tullis; and Harry G. Wenzel
1976	Zdenek P. Bazant; Danny L. Fread; Lester A. Hoe; Paul H. King; And John Lysmer
1975	Anil K. Chopra; Izzat M. Idriss; Ignacio Rodriguez-Iturbe; Larry A. Roesner; and Don James Wood
1974	Asit K. Biswas; Hugo B. Fischer; Alfred J. Hendron, Jr.; Thomas T. C. Hsu; and Paul C. Jennings
1973	Charles G. Culver; James M. Duncan; Lee E. King; John T. Oden; Chhih Ted Yang
1972	John A. Hoopes; William B. Ledbetter; Roy E. Olson; Masanobu Shinozuka; Robert L. Street
1971	Carl A. Cornell; Marvin Gates; Raymond J. Krizek; Norbert R. Morgenstern; Kam Wu Wong
1970	Kenneth L. Lee; Daniel P. Loucks; Lucien A. Schmit; Marshall R. Thompson; Jan Van Schilfgaarde
1969	John W. Fisher; Cyril J. Galvin; Charles C. Ladd; Arthur R. Robinson; and Ronald F. Scott
1968	Alfredo H. S. Ang; Bobby O. Hardin; Marvin E. Jensen; Eduard Naudascher; Jimmie E. Quon
1967	Jack G. Bouwkamp; George Bugliarello; Donald L. Dean; T. Cameron Kenney; James M. Symons
1966	Melvin L. Baron; Louis R. Shaffer; George C. Driscoll; William W. Sayre; Paul W. Shuldiner
1965	Herman Bouwer; James K. Mitchell; Joseph Penzien; Gordon G. Robeck; and Rudolph P. Savage
1964	Steve J. Fenves; Theodore V. Galambos; John F. Kennedy; Perry L. Mccarty; and Emilio Rosenblueth
1963	Peter S. Eagleson; Robert M. Haythornthwaite; Houssam M. Karara; Thorndike Saville, Jr.; Mete A. Sozen
1962	Ven Te Chow; William Joel Hall; Alan Hanson Mattock; Robert V. Whitman; Robert L. Wiegel
1961	Emmett M. Laursen; William H. Munse; H. Solton See; Anestis Veletsos; Stanley D. Wilson
1960	Ray W. Clough; Phil M. Ferguson; Donald R. F. Harleman; Bruno Thurlimann; David K. Todd
1959	Charles L. Bretschneider; Norman H. Brooks; Arthur Casagrande; George S. Vincent; Daniel Frederick
1958	John Wood Clark; Hans A. Einstein; Warren J. Kaufman; Raymond D. Mindlin; Ivan M. Viest
1957	Mikael Juul Hvorslev; Bruce G. Johnston; Lorenz G. Straub
1956	Vinton Walker Bacon; Fred Burggraf; Chester Paul Siess
1955	Lynn S. Beedle; Eivind Hognestad; Philip F. Morgan
1949	John S. Mcnown

== See also ==
- List of engineering awards
