= José E. Andrade =

American academic

José E. Andrade (born November 30, 1979) is a professor of civil and mechanical engineering at the California Institute of Technology, where he holds the George W. Housner professorship. From January 2016 to February 2022, he served as Executive Officer and held the title of Cecil and Sally Drinkward Leadership Chair for Mechanical and Civil Engineering at Caltech.

José E. Andrade received his B.S. in civil engineering at the Florida Institute of Technology in 2001. He moved to Stanford University for his graduate studies, receiving an M.S. in 2003 and a PhD in civil engineering in 2006, under the supervision of Ronaldo I. Borja. His doctoral thesis was titled "Meso-scale finite element simulation of deformation banding in fluid-saturated sands." From 2006-2010 he was an Assistant Professor of Civil and Environmental Engineering at Northwestern University.

In 2017, he received the Thomas J.R. Hughes Young Investigator Award followed by the Walter L. Huber Civil Engineering Research Prize award in 2018. In 2022, he was elected a Fellow of The American Society of Mechanical Engineers, ASME Fellow.
