= Mary C. Hill =

American hydrologist

Mary Catherine Hill
- Education: Hope College (BS); Princeton University (MS, PhD)
- Awards: Member of the National Academy Engineering (2021)
- Scientific career
- Fields: Hydrology
- Workplaces: USGS; University of Kansas
- Thesis: An investigation of hydraulic conductivity estimation in a ground-water flow study of Northern Long Valley, New Jersey

Mary Catherine Hill is an American hydrologist, a member of the National Academy of Engineering, the winner of the Walter L. Huber Civil Engineering Research Prize and of the Dooge Medal of the International Association of Hydrological Sciences, a Darcy Lecturer for the National Ground Water Association, and Fellow of the American Geophysical Union and the Geological Society of America. After working for 33 years at the United States Geological Survey, she became a professor of geology at the University of Kansas.

== Education and career ==
Hill received her B.S. in Business Administration and Geology from Hope College, and received her masters and doctorate in civil engineering under the direction of George F. Pinder, specializing in water resources, at Princeton University in 1985. Her dissertation was An investigation of hydraulic conductivity estimation in a ground-water flow study of Northern Long Valley, New Jersey.

She worked for 33 years at the United States Geological Survey (USGS) before joining the geology department at the University of Kansas as a professor in 2014. She is PI on a $2.5M NSF INFEWS (Innovations at the Food, Energy, Water Nexus) program grant from 2019 to 2024.

== Contributions ==
Much of Hill's research at the USGS concerned groundwater modeling, simulation of groundwater, and evaluation of the accuracy of groundwater simulations. At the USGS, she was one of the main developers of the MODFLOW groundwater flow simulation code. More recently, she has also studied modeling and simulation of rainwater runoff.

At the University of Kansas, she established the Mary C. Hill Research Fund for Women in the Sciences to help support female junior faculty in science, technology, engineering, and mathematics.

With Claire R. Tiedeman, Hill is the author of the book Effective Groundwater Model Calibration: With Analysis of Data, Sensitivities, Predictions, and Uncertainty (John Wiley & Sons, 2007).

== Recognition ==
Hill won the Walter L. Huber Civil Engineering Research Prize in 2000, and was Darcy Lecturer for the National Ground Water Association in 2001. In 2005, the National Ground Water Association awarded her the M. King Hubbert Award. In 2015, the International Association of Hydrological Sciences awarded her the Dooge Medal.

Hill is past president of the International Commission for Ground Water ICGW. She has been a Fellow of the Geological Society of America since 2003, and was also elected as a Fellow of the American Geophysical Union "for development of innovative methods for parameter estimation and sensitivity analysis in hydrologic modeling".

In 2021, Hill was elected as a member of the National Academy of Engineering "for contributions to development and application of methods for parameter estimation and sensitivity analysis in hydrologic models".
