= Roseanna Neupauer =

American civil engineer

- Education: Carnegie Mellon University; Massachusetts Institute of Technology; New Mexico Institute of Mining and Technology; University of Colorado Boulder
- Awards: Walter L. Huber Civil Engineering Research Prize (2006)
- Scientific career
- Fields: Civil engineering, groundwater modeling
- Workplaces: University of Virginia; University of Colorado Boulder
- Doctoral advisor: John Wilson
- Other academic advisors: Brian Borchers

Roseanna Marie Neupauer is an American civil engineer specializing in groundwater modeling. She is a professor and professional engineer at the University of Colorado Boulder.

== Life ==
Neupauer earned a B.S. in civil engineering from Carnegie Mellon University in 1989. She received a S.M. in civil engineering from Massachusetts Institute of Technology in 1991. She completed a M.S. (1999) in applied math and a Ph.D. (2000) in hydrology from New Mexico Institute of Mining and Technology. Her master's thesis was titled, A Comparison of Two Methods for Recovering the Release History of a Groundwater Contamination Source. Brian Borchers was her master's thesis academic advisor. Her dissertation was titled, Receptor-Based Modeling of Groundwater Contamination. John Wilson was her doctoral advisor. In 2018, she earned a B.A. in Spanish from the University of Colorado Boulder.

Neupauer was an assistant professor in the department of civil engineering at the University of Virginia from 2001 to 2004. In 2005, she joined the faculty at the University of Colorado Boulder where she is a professor and professional engineer. She specializes in groundwater modeling. She won the Walter L. Huber Civil Engineering Research Prize in 2006. In 2023, Neupauer was elected a fellow of the American Society of Civil Engineers.
