= Yuri Bazilevs =

American engineer

- Education: Rensselaer Polytechnic Institute; University of Texas at Austin
- Scientific career
- Workplaces: Brown University

Yuri Bazilevs is the E. Paul Sorensen Chair at the Brown University School of Engineering. His research is highly cited. Before coming to Brown in 2018, Bazilevs taught at the University of California, San Diego's Jacobs School of Engineering.

Bazilevs earned his bachelor's and master's degree from Rensselaer Polytechnic Institute and his doctorate from the University of Texas at Austin.

== Honors and awards ==
- American Society of Mechanical Engineers Materials Division Centennial Mid-Career Award, 2021
- Walter L. Huber Civil Engineering Research Prize, 2018
- Thomas J.R. Hughes Young Investigator Award, 2012
- Fellow, United States Association for Computational Mechanics, 2015
