= Danny Lee Fread =

- Born: July 17, 1938; Tuscola, Illinois, U.S.
- Died: May 2, 2009 (aged 70); Huntingdon, Pennsylvania, U.S.
- Known for: Hydraulics, Hydrology
- Spouse: Helen Hale Fread
- Awards: Department of Commerce Gold Medal, the American Society of Civil Engineers (ASCE) Walter L. Huber Civil Engineering Research Prize and J.C. Stevens Award, the Federal Laboratory Consortium Award for Technology Transfer, the Association of State Dam Safety Officials (ASDSO) National Award of Merit, and the American Meteorological Society Award of Fellow.

Danny Lee Fread (July 17, 1939 - February 5, 2009) was an American hydraulic engineer and Senior Research Hydrologist, best known for his computer-based mathematical simulation programs for rainfall and runoff to forecast the flow of flooding rivers and dam failures.

== Early life and education ==
Danny Fread was born on July 17, 1939, in Tuscola, IL, the son of Harold and Margaret E. Dyer Fread. Danny graduated from Lovington High School, in Lovington, Illinois. He began his undergraduate studies at Carthage College, in Carthage, IL, where he studied liberal arts and excelled in track and field as well as basketball. Danny set a school record for his javelin throw in 1959 and was reputedly the "team's best pole vaulter." and lettered in basketball, where he was known for his "deadly jump shot." Fread then transferred to the University of Missouri-Rolla, in Rolla, Missouri and received his B.S. in civil engineering in 1961. He ranked first in his graduating class.

== Career ==
After completing his undergraduate degree, Danny Fread worked six years for Texaco, where he was promoted to Senior Engineer, specializing in the design of gravity and pressurized piping systems. He then returned to University of Missouri-Rolla to complete his Ph.D. in civil engineering in 1971. His studies focused on hydraulics / hydrology / mathematics, and his research was centered on unsteady flow and numerical / experimental simulation of breached dams. After earning his degree, he became a research hydrologist with the National Weather Service, where he spent 29 years. Inspired by the tragedy of the failure of the Grand Teton Dam in 1976, he undertook research on the development of computer models to forecast the flow of flooding rivers and dam failures. His 1973 ASCE paper presented a conceptual model to alleviate flood damages due to overtopping failures of small earthfill dams. It discussed erosion patterns and the potential reduction in the reservoir release due base on a proposed erosion retarding layer.

During the 70's and 80's he personally formulated, coded, and tested mathematical simulation programs, including:

- The DWOPER model simulates unsteady flows from rainfall runoff in river systems
- The DAMBRK and SMPDBK models simulate unsteady flows from breached dams in a single river
- BREACH simulates the erosive formation of breaches in earthen dams
- FLDWAV is an improved simulation model of unsteady flows from rainfall-runoff and from breached

dams in a single river or network of rivers. These models have been utilized for unsteady river flow modeling by Federal and State Agencies, as well as private agencies and consulting firms across the United States and Canada and over 20 countries worldwide. Dr. Fread taught numerous training workshops; authored 50 and co-authored 42 professional scientific papers; and contributed chapters to four books including the Handbook of Hydrology. He was also a Fellow of the American Meteorological Society. His career culminated with the position as the Director of the Office of Hydrology with the National Weather Service.

== Awards and recognition ==
Danny Fread received several national awards for his work, including:

- Department of Commerce Gold Medal
- Walter L. Huber Civil Engineering Research Prize from the American Society of Civil Engineers (ASCE)
- J.C. Stevens Award from the ASCE
- Association of State Dam Safety Officials National Award of Merit

== Published works ==
- Fread, D., & United States. National Weather Service. Hydrologic Research Laboratory. (1988). BREACH, an erosion model for earthen dam failures. Silver Spring, Md.: Hydrologic Research Laboratory, National Weather Service, NOAA.
- Fread, D., & United States. National Weather Service. Hydrologic Research Laboratory. (1984). DWOPER: National weather service operational dynamic wave model (Hydro technical note, no. 3). Silver Spring, Md.: Hydrologic Research Laboratory, National Weather Service, NOAA.
- Fread, D., & United States. National Weather Service. (1982). A dynamic model of stage-discharge relations affected by changing discharge (Rev. Oct. 1976, repr. July 1982 ed., Noaa technical memorandum nws hydro, 16). Silver Spring, Md.: U.S. Dept. of Commerce, National Oceanic and Atmospheric Administration, National Weather Service.
- Fread, D., & United States. Office of Hydrology. (1974). Numerical properties of implicit four-point finite difference equations of unsteady flow (Noaa technical memorandum NWS hydro, 18). Washington, D.C.: National Oceanic and Atmospheric Administration, National Weather Service.
- Fread, D., & United States. National Weather Service. Hydrologic Research Laboratory. (1988). The NWS DAMBRK model: Theoretical background/user documentation. Silver Spring, Md.: Hydrologic Research Laboratory, National Weather Service, NOAA.
- Fread, D., & United States. Office of Water Resources Research. (1971). Transient hydraulic simulation: Breached earth dams (Unpublished doctoral dissertation). University of Missouri--Rolla.
- Fread, D. L., & Harbaugh, T. E. (1971). Open-channel profiles by Newton's iteration technique. Journal of Hydrology, 13, 78–80.
- Jin, M., Fread, D., & Lewis, J. (2000). Application of relaxation scheme to wave-propagation simulation in open-channel networks. Journal of Hydraulic Engineering -New York-, 126, 89-90.
- Jin, M., & Fread, D., Member, ASCE. (1997). Dynamic flood routing with explicit and implicit numerical solution schemes. Journal of Hydraulic Engineering, 123(3), 166-173. doi:10.1061/(ASCE)0733-9429(1997)123:3(166)

== Personal life ==
Fread had one daughter, Kristin with Helen Hale Fread in 1962. After his retirement, he and his wife moved to Pennsylvania to be near their daughter and family. He died on February 5, 2009, in Huntingdon, Pennsylvania, at the age of 70, and was buried there.
