= Franz-Josef Ulm =

German structural engineer and scientist

- Born: March 9, 1964 (age 62); Fürth/Bavaria, West Germany
- Education: Technical University of Munich; École des ponts ParisTech; École normale supérieure Paris-Saclay
- Occupations: professor, engineer, scientist
- Employer: Massachusetts Institute of Technology
- Awards: Huber Award; von Karman Medal; US National Academy of Engineering
- Website: cshub.mit.edu/ulm

Franz-Josef Ulm (born March 9, 1964 in Fürth/Bavaria, West Germany) is a structural engineer, an engineering scientist and a professor since 1999. He is Professor of Civil & Environmental Engineering at the Massachusetts Institute of Technology (MIT), the Faculty Director of the Concrete Sustainability Hub (CSHub@MIT). He is credited for discovering the nanogranular structure of calcium silicate hydrates (C-S-H), the binding phase of concrete, and for the development of concepts of nanoengineering of concrete which combine advanced nanomechanics experiments with molecular simulation results. He advocates for environmentally sustainable engineering, with "greener" concrete with lower CO_{2} footprint, to reduce the carbon footprint of concrete; to enhance concrete's resilience; and reduce its impact on global warming.

== Early career ==
Ulm grew up in Fürth/Bavaria and Erlangen as son of Udo Ulm and Hertha Ulm, both Structural Engineers. Following National Service as a nurse in a surgical hospital in Erlangen, he studied Civil Engineering at the Technical University of Munich, where he graduated in 1990 with a "Diplom Ingenieur (Bauingenieur)"(Eq. MSc) degree. Prior to concluding his studies in Munich, he was sent to the Ecole National des Ponts et Chaussee as an exchange student, and completed his Diplomarbeit (Master's Thesis) at the Laboratoire central des ponts et chaussées (LCPC) in Paris (now IFSTTAR), the Central French Civil Engineering Laboratory. He continued his studies at Ecole National des Ponts et Chaussees, as a research assistance at LCPC, receiving a Docteur-Ingenieur degree (eq. Ph.D.) from ENPC in January 1994, with a specialization in Materials and Structures. During this time, he worked closely with Olivier Coussy on the English translation of Coussy's book "Mechanics of Porous Continua". The collaboration of Ulm with Coussy led to the development of the Continuum Chemomechanics theory which has been applied by Ulm and co-workers to Early–Age Concrete and risk evalDiuation of concrete cracking relevant for massive concrete structures in innovative bridge and tunneling applications; to prediction of premature deterioration of concrete structures due to the Alkali-Silica Reactions; and the deleterious effects of calcium leaching of concrete relevant for nuclear waste storage applications. In 1996, he became Chargé de Recherche (Research Scientist) of the French Ministry of Public Works. During his tenure at LCPC, he was head of the Research group of concrete and concrete composite behavior and modeling. In 1998, he obtained the habilitation degree from the Ecole Normal Superieur de Cachan with a habilitation thesis on chemomechanics of concrete materials and structures.

== Academic career ==
Ulm joined MIT in January 1999, where he specialized in experimental nano- and micromechanics of cement-based materials, shales and bones. With his research group, he developed statistical nanoindentation techniques for hydrated nanocomposites; an indentation technique that permits via statistical analysis to link chemistry and mechanical behavior at 10s of nanometer length scales. In 2007, his group discovered that cementitious materials at nanoscale exhibit a nanogranular behavior driven by particle-to-particle contact forces. This nanogranular origin was found to drive much of the strength and durability performance of cementitious materials, such as the long-term creep behavior and fire resistance. A similar nanogranular nature was found for shales and bones. In 2008, he joined forces with a group of physicists and computational material scientists to combine experimental nanoindentation investigations with molecular and meso-scale simulations of cement hydrates. Specifically, the collaboration with Roland Pellenq, a CNRS Research Director and senior research scientist at MIT, allowed identification of the molecular structure of calcium-silicate hydrates, the binding phase of concrete which lends its strength and durability to concrete at engineering scales. By incorporating concepts of glass physics and soft matter physics into cement science, Ulm and co-workers showed by means of a molecular combinatorial approach that concrete's fundamental strength could be elevated without changing the chemistry of its constituents, i.e. Calcium, Silica and Water. The handshake of molecular simulation techniques with experimental nanoscale experiments opened a novel way to address the concrete sustainability challenge to reduce the environmental impact while sustaining its role as the backbone material for housing, shelter and infrastructure worldwide. The challenge led, in 2009, to the foundation of the Concrete Sustainability Hub at MIT (CSHub@MIT). This novel industry–academia partnership between the Portland Cement Association (Skokie, Illinois), the National Ready Mixed Concrete Association (Silver Spring, Maryland) and MIT aims at reducing the environmental footprint of concrete, while enhancing its resilience from materials to structures and urban community scale.

As of 2024, Ulm is working on carbon-cement supercapacitors, a technology that is being developed for large-scale energy storage. The basic concept of creating a supercapacitor from simple cement materials and carbon black has been demonstrated, but the technology is far from being a fieldable product.

Compared to other forms of bulk energy storage, the proposed carbon-cement supercapacitor material would have a high power density.

== Awards ==
- 2002 Robert L'Hermite Medaille, RILEM
- 2005 Walter L. Huber Civil Engineering Research Prize
- 2010 Maurice A. Biot lecture at Columbia University
- 2011 Stephen Brunauer Award, American Ceramic Society
- 2012 Theodore von Karman Medal, American Society of Civil Engineers
- 2013 Best paper award 2012: Acta Geotechnica
- 2013 Engineering Mechanics Institute Fellow
- 2013 Engineering News Record Award of Excellence
- 2014 Elected Member of European Academy of Sciences and Arts
- 2022 Elected Member of National Academy of Engineering
