= Eleni Chatzi =

Greek civil engineer

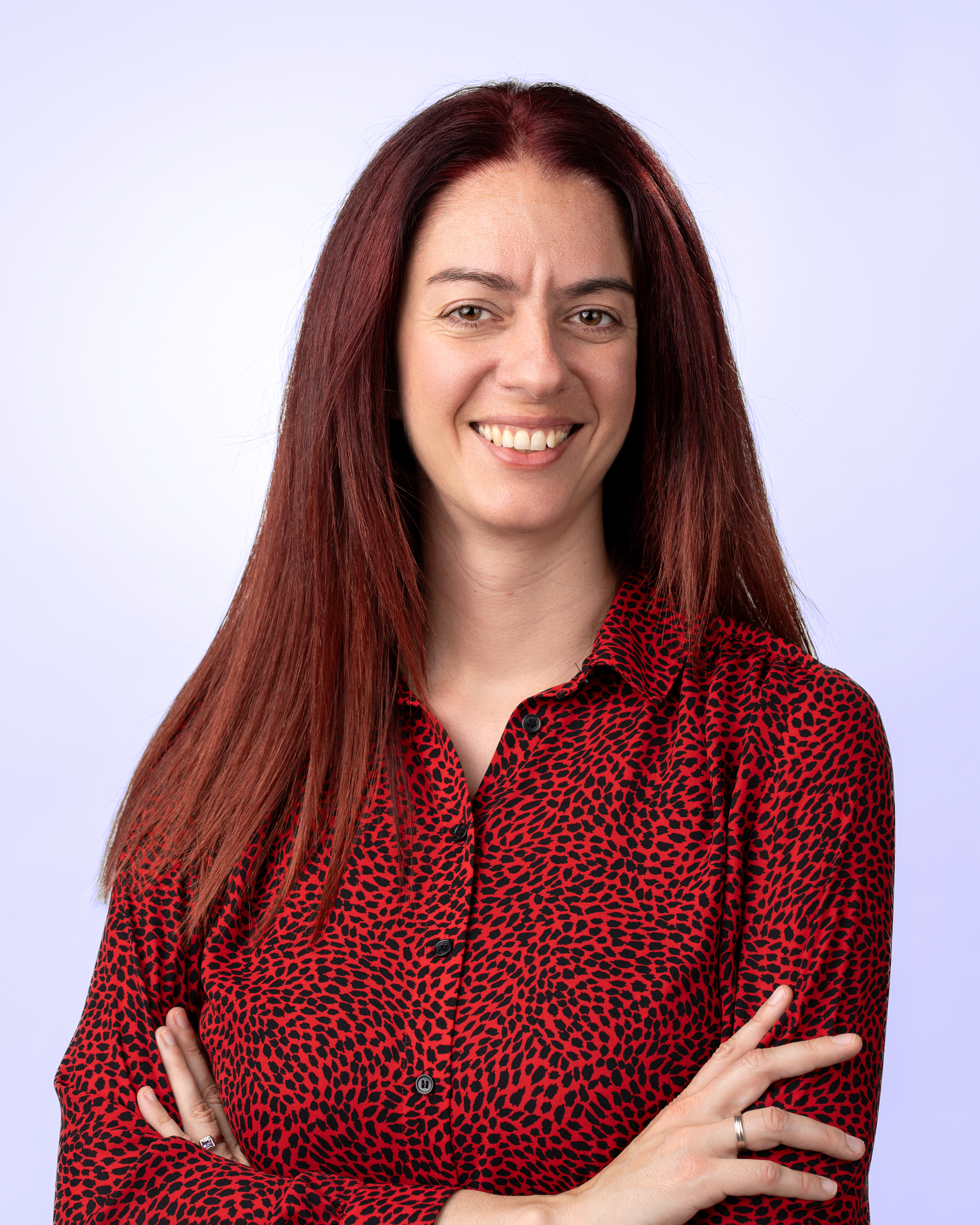
- Chatzi in 2024
- Education: National Technical University of Athens
- Occupation: Civil Engineer
- Known for: Chair of Structural Mechanics and Monitoring at the Institute of Structural Engineering, ETH Zurich

Eleni Chatzi (born 18 November 1981) is a Greek civil engineer, researcher, and a Full professor and Chair of Structural Mechanics and Monitoring at the Department of Civil, Environmental and Geomatic Engineering of the Swiss Federal Institute of Technology in Zurich.

== Education ==
Chatzi obtained her diploma and master's degree MSc in Civil Engineering with honors from the Department of Civil Engineering at the National Technical University of Athens (NTUA). In 2010 she obtained her PhD Degree with distinction from the Department of Civil Engineering & Engineering Mechanics at Columbia University.

== Work ==
In 2010 Chatzi was hired as the youngest assistant professor at ETH Zurich. She was promoted to an associate professor in 2017 and a full professor in 2024. Chatzi works in the domains of Scientific and Physics-Enhanced Machine Learning, building data-driven and physics-informed decision-support tools for structures, infrastructures and engineered systems at-large. She is an expert in the field of Structural Health Monitoring^{-}, with applications extending across a range of systems including civil, mechanical and aerospace structures and components. She has delivered a number of works on the state/parameter^{-} state/input and state/input/parameter identification of dynamical systems, relying on novel Bayesian filtering formulations. On the hybrid modeling front, Chatzi develops approaches for reducing the complexity of physics-based simulations derived from structural mechanics, including phenomena such as plasticity, nonlinear dynamics, and fracture, enabling their seamless fusion with data as it becomes available. Chatzi has contributed extensively to the development of efficient metamodels for dynamic systems that account for uncertainties through stochastic and machine learning methods, supporting virtualization, digital twinning and real-time monitoring and control.

Chatzi further serves as an editor for international journals in the domains of Dynamics and Structural Health Monitoring, including Mechanical Systems and Signal Processing, the Journal of Sound and Vibration, Data Centric Engineering, the Journal of Structural Engineering, the ASCE Journal of Engineering Mechanics, as well as the ASCE-ASME Journal of Risk and Uncertainty in Engineering. From 2016-2021, she served as coordinator of the joint ETH Zürich & University of Zurich PhD Programme in Computational Science. Since 2022, she is the Chair of the Swiss Community for Coputational Methods in Applied Sciences (SWICCOMAS). Since 2024, she serves as the President of the European Academy of Wind Energy (EAWE).

== Awards ==
- 2024 SHM Person of the Year award
- 2023 J.M. Ko Award for excellence in Structural Engineering
- 2020 EASD Junior Research Prize in the area of Computational Structural Dynamics, awarded by the European Association of Structural Dynamics (EASD)
- 2020 ASCE Walter L. Huber Civil Engineering Research Prize
- 2019 Telford Premium Prize
- 2019 TUM-IAS Hans Fischer Fellowship awarded by the TÜV Süd Foundation
