= Journal of Materials Processing Technology =

- Discipline: Technology
- Language: English

Publication details
- Publisher: Elsevier
- Impact factor: 6.162 (2021)

Standard abbreviations
- ISO 4: J. Mater. Process. Technol.

Indexing
- ISSN: 0924-0136

Links
- Journal homepage; Online archive

Journal of Materials Processing Technology is a peer-reviewed scientific journal covering research on all aspects of processing techniques used in manufacturing components from various materials. It is published by Elsevier and the editor-in-chief is Z. Liao (University of Nottingham).

== Abstracting and indexing ==
The journal is abstracted and indexed in Scopus, Science Citation Index Expanded, Metadex, and Inspec. The journal has a 2021 impact factor of 6.162.
