= Barbara Minsker =

American civil, environmental, and systems engineer

- Born: Barbara S. Minsker
- Education: Cornell University (B.S. 1986, Ph.D. 1995)
- Awards: NSF CAREER Award; ASCE Walter L. Huber Civil Engineering Research Prize; Fellow, Environmental & Water Resources Institute (EWRI)
- Engineering career
- Discipline: Environmental engineering, civil engineering, hydroinformatics, data analytics
- Practice name: Department of Civil and Environmental Engineering at SMU (Former Chair)
- Projects: "Brown Dog" semantic data curation web services (NCSA); Interactive Design and Assessment System for Green Infrastructure (IDEAS_GI); Data-driven simulation-optimization models for pluvial flash flood prediction
- Significant design: Cloud-based systems coupling distributed hydrologic modeling with machine learning for urban stormwater management

Barbara E. Minsker (also published as Barbara Spang Minsker) is an American civil, environmental, and systems engineer. Her research concerns the sustainability and resilience of the water supply and of urban infrastructure, including the use of data-driven modeling and metaheuristics in optimizing water resource policy. She is the Bobby B. Lyle Endowed Professor of Leadership and Global Entrepreneurship at Southern Methodist University, where she is also a professor of civil and environmental engineering and of computer science, and a Senior Fellow at the Hunt Institute for Engineering and Humanity.

== Education and career ==
Minsker studied operations research and industrial engineering as an undergraduate at Cornell University, where she graduated with distinction in 1986. After several years of work as an environmental policy analyst, she returned to Cornell for graduate study in civil and environmental engineering, supported by an NSF Graduate Research Fellowship, and completed her Ph.D. there in 1995. Her doctoral dissertation, Dynamic Optimal Control of in situ Bioremediation of Groundwater, was supervised by Christine Shoemaker.

She was a postdoctoral researcher in the Research Center for Groundwater Remediation Design at the University of Vermont, and then in 1996 took an assistant professor position in the Department of Civil and Environmental Engineering at the University of Illinois Urbana-Champaign. There, she became an Arthur and Virginia Nauman Faculty Scholar in 2001, was promoted to associate professor in 2002, and to full professor in 2006. She also served as president of Hazard Management Systems Inc. from 2005 to 2007 and of Joyful U Inc. from 2010 to 2015.

She moved to Southern Methodist University in 2016 as chair of the Department of Civil and Environmental Engineering.

== Books ==
Minsker is the author of:

- The Joyful Professor: How to Shift from Surviving to Thriving in the Faculty Life (2010). ISBN 978-1-59598-078-6.
- Discovering the Path of Success and Happiness: Mindful Living with Purpose and Resilience (2014)

== Recognition ==
Minsker was a 2000 recipient of the Presidential Early Career Award for Scientists and Engineers, and a 2003 recipient of the American Society of Civil Engineers (ASCE) Walter L. Huber Civil Engineering Research Prize. She was the 2012 recipient of the ASCE Environmental and Water Resources Institute (EWRI) Service to the Profession Award.

She was named as an EWRI Fellow in 2017. In 2019, the ASCE gave her their Margaret S. Petersen Award. In 2026, she was named as an ASCE Fellow and was awarded ASCE's Julian Hinds Award, their highest honor for water resources planning and management.
