= Wei Cai =

Chinese–American mechanical engineer

Wei Cai is a professor of mechanical engineering at Stanford University.

== Early life and career ==
In 1995, Cai received his Bachelor of Science degree in optoelectronics from Huazhong University of Science and Technology in Hubei province, China. In 2001, Cai received a Ph.D. in nuclear engineering from the Massachusetts Institute of Technology and immediately after it became a postdoc at the Lawrence Livermore National Laboratory, where he remained until 2004. In July 2004, Cai became an assistant professor of mechanical engineering at Stanford University, and in September 2011 was promoted to associate professor.

== Memberships ==
Wei Cai is a member of numerous societies including: American Nuclear Society, American Physical Society, Materials Research Society, Alpha Nu Sigma Honor Society of American Nuclear Society and Sigma Xi.

== Works ==
- 2006 – Computer Simulations of Dislocations
- 2016 – Imperfections in Crystalline Solids
