= Vincent P. Drnevich =

American engineer and emeritus professor

Vincent Paul Drnevich
- Born: Pittsburgh, PA
- Spouse: Roxanne M. (nee Hosier)
- Scientific career
- Education: Notre Dame (BS, MS); University of Michigan (PhD)
- Fields: Civil Engineering
- Workplaces: University of Kentucky; Purdue University
- Thesis: Effects Of Strain History On The Dynamic Properties Of Sand (1967)

Vincent Paul Drnevich is an American engineer and emeritus professor from Purdue University. He is known for his research contributions focused upon the engineering properties of soils and concrete. In honor of his contributions, he had been named a Fellow of American Society of Civil Engineers, American Society for Testing and Materials, National Society of Professional Engineers, and Indiana Society of Professional Engineers.

== Engineering career ==
Vincent Drnevich received B.S. and M.S. degrees from the University of Notre Dame, and his Ph.D. degree from the University of Michigan. Following graduation, he taught for 24 years at the University of Kentucky, where he served as the department chair for the civil engineering department, along with one year as the acting Dean of Engineering. Afterwards from 1991 until 2000, he served as the school head for civil engineering at Purdue University.

In 2008, Indiana Governor Mitch Daniels appointed him to the Indiana Board of Registration for Professional Engineers, where he was elected chair in 2013.

== Awards and honors ==
He has received numerous awards, in addition to being named a Fellow from ASCE, ASTM, NSPE, and ISPE. The following are some of them:

- Hogentogler Award in 1979 & 2014 and Woodland G. Shockley Award in 1996 from ASTM.
- George Wadlin Award in 2002 from ASEE.
- Harold T. Larson Award in 1985 and the James M. Robbins Award in 1989 from Chi Epsilon.
- Thomas A. Morris Engineering Leadership Award in 2013 from ISPE.
- Diplomate of Geotechnical Engineering from the Academy of Geo-Professionals in 2009.
- In 2006, the Hardin-Drnevich-Huang Professorship in Geotechnical Engineering was established at the University of Kentucky, named partially in his name in recognition for his working in creating a nationally recognized program in geotechnical engineering at the university.
