= Marco Amabili =

Italian-Canadian university professor and researcher

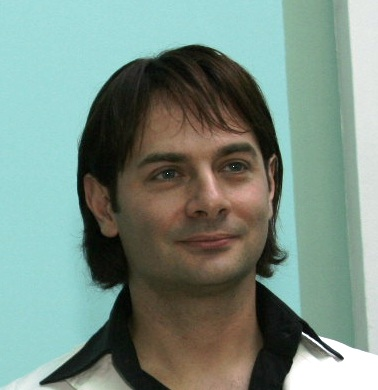
- Born: San Benedetto del Tronto, Italy
- Education: University of Bologna (Ph.D.), University of Ancona (B. Mech Eng. + Master of Sciences Mech. Eng.)
- Known for: Nonlinear vibrations of shells, Fluid-structure interaction, Nonlinear shell theories, Nonlinear damping, Vascular biomechanics.
- Scientific career
- Fields: Theoretical, computational and experimental vibrations; theory of plates and shells; fluid-structure interaction; mechanics of the aorta; smart structures; dynamics of MEMS
- Workplaces: Westlake University; McGill University; University of Parma

Notes
- He is a Changjiang chair professor at Westlake University in Hangzhou, China, and Emeritus Distinguished James McGill professor at McGill University, Montreal, Canada

Marco Amabili is a Changjiang chair professor in the School of Engineering at Westlake University in Hangzhou, China. He is also an Emeritus Distinguished James McGill professor at the Department of Mechanical Engineering at McGill University, Montreal, Québec, Canada.

== Biography and achievements ==
Marco Amabili was born and raised in San Benedetto del Tronto, Italy. He studied at the University of Ancona (now renamed Marche Polytechnic University) where he received his M.S. in Mechanical Engineering. He obtained his Ph.D. in Mechanical Engineering from the University of Bologna. Amabili is very well known for his extensive research on nonlinear vibrations and dynamic stability of shell and plate structures, a subject to which he has given many innovative contributions. He is also very active in studying nonlinear vibrations and biomechanics of the human aorta and advanced aortic grafts, composite structures, MEMS and active vibration control. Professor Amabili serves as Editor-in-Chief for International Journal of Non-linear Mechanics (Elsevier) and is co-Editor-in-Chief of the International Journal of Mechanical System Dynamics (Wiley). He was Associate Editor of the Journal of Fluids and Structures and Mechanics Research Communications, both by Elsevier; he served as associate editor of Applied Mechanics Reviews, ASME, and Journal of Vibration and Acoustics, ASME. He is a member of the editorial board of several journals, including the Journal of Sound and Vibration, Elsevier. He was the chair of the executive committee of the Applied Mechanics Division of the American Society of Mechanical Engineers (ASME) in 2023-2024 and the Chair of the ASME Technical Committee Dynamics and Control of Systems and Structures. Marco Amabili is an elected Fellow of the Royal Society of Canada - Academy of Sciences and an International Member of the National Academy of Engineering (NAE) of the USA. He is also a Fellow of the Canadian Academy of Engineering and the Engineering Institute of Canada. He was elected Fellow of the European Academy of Sciences and Arts in 2018 and a foreign member of Academia Europaea in 2020. He served as chair of the Canadian National Committee for IUTAM (International Union of Theoretical and Applied Mechanics) from 2019 till the end of 2023. Amabili delivered the Koiter lecture of the Dutch Research School on Engineering Mechanics in 2019. The Koiter lecture honors researchers who have made profound contributions to the field of Engineering Mechanics, and it has a rich history. In 2020 he received the Worcester Reed Warner Medal of the ASME; established in 1930, it is one of the society awards with the longest history. He received the 2021 Raymond D. Mindlin medal of the American Society of Civil Engineers (ASCE) for outstanding research contributions to applied solid mechanics. He was awarded the Gili-Agostinelli International Prize for mechanics of the Lincei National Academy of Sciences of Italy in November 2021. Amabili was the recipient of the 2022 Guggenheim Fellowship in engineering, one of the highest recognitions in North America. He was elected Honorary Member of the ASME in 2024, the oldest and one of the highest recognitions of the society.

Professor Amabili is working in the area of vibrations, nonlinear dynamics and stability of thin-walled structures, reduced-order models, fluid-structure interaction and vascular biomechanics. His research is multi-disciplinary, and it has been utilized in the design and analysis of aeronautical and aerospace structures, laminated and FGM shell structures, improving the design of vascular grafts, safety of pressure tanks and innovative flow-meters. Amabili is the author of about 300 papers in refereed international journals (plus about 300 conference papers and presentations), including Nature Communications, Physical Review X and PNAS) in applied mechanics and has achieved a high h-Index. He is the author of the monographs Nonlinear Vibrations and Stability of Shells and Plates and Nonlinear Mechanics of Shells and Plates in Composite, Soft and Biological Materials both published by Cambridge University Press.

Amabili, together with M.P. Païdoussis and F. Pellicano, showed for the first time the strongly subcritical behavior of the stability of circular cylindrical shells conveying flow. A series of papers presented theoretical, numerical and experimental investigations, showing that a supported circular shell made of aluminum presents divergence for much smaller velocity than predicted by linear theory. Since 2014, Amabili developed innovative shell theories with thickness deformation. These theories were extended to model soft biological tissues that undergo large thickness deformations and are described as incompressible and hyperelastic. This interest was expanded into the experimental and numerical study of the mechanics of the human aorta, the viscoelastic characterization of aortic tissues with and without smooth muscle activation and aortic grafts.

In 2017 Amabili participated to a research with the Technical University of Delft to identify the Young modulus of Graphene nano-drums from nonlinear vibrations; the outcome of the study was published in Nature Communications.

Amabili was the first to report the experimentally observed nonlinear damping in large-amplitude vibrations in 2003. He developed, for the first time, original and innovative models of nonlinear damping by introducing geometric nonlinearity in linear viscoelasticity, a very complex and important problem in engineering applications.

== Education ==
- Ph.D. in Mech. Eng. – University of Bologna, Italy, 1996
- M.Sc. in Mech. Eng. – University of Ancona (Marche Polytechnic University), Ancona, Italy, 1992

== International awards ==
- International Member National Academy of Engineering (NAE), 2024
- Fellow of the Royal Society of Canada - Academy of Sciences, 2020
- Honorary Member of the American Society of Mechanical Engineers (ASME), 2024
- Guggenheim Fellowship in Engineering for USA and Canada, John Simon Guggenheim Memorial Foundation, 2022
- Worcester Reed Warner Medal of the American Society of Mechanical Engineers (ASME), 2020
- Raymond D. Mindlin Medal of the American Society of Civil Engineers (ASCE), 2021
- Cataldo Agostinelli and Angiola Gili-Agostinelli International Prize of the Lincei National Academy of Sciences of Italy, 2021
- Fellow of the Canadian Academy of Engineering, 2019
- Foreign Member of the National Academy of Sciences of Ukraine, 2025
- Foreign Member of Academia Europaea, 2020
- Member of the European Academy of Sciences and Arts, 2018
- Member of the European Academy of Sciences, 2020
- Rayleigh Lecture Award, American Society of Mechanical Engineers (ASME), 2022
- Blaise Pascal Medal in engineering, European Academy of Sciences (Brussels), 2022
- Koiter lecture of the Dutch research school on Engineering Mechanics in 2019
- Fellow of the Engineering Institute of Canada, 2020
- Christophe Pierre Research Excellence Award, McGill University, 2015
- Fellow of the American Society of Mechanical Engineers (ASME), 2011

== Books ==
- M. Amabili, Nonlinear vibrations and stability of shells and plates, Cambridge University Press (2008). ISBN 978-0-521-88329-0
- M. Amabili, Nonlinear mechanics of shells and plates in composite, soft and biological materials, Cambridge University Press (2018). ISBN 978-1-107-12922-1
