= Amir Faghri =

American mechanical engineering professor (born 1951)

- Born: April 16, 1951 (age 75); Isfahan, Iran
- Education: University of California, Berkeley; Oregon State University
- Known for: Contributions to heat transfer, heat pipes
- Awards: ASME Honorary Member (2019); Max Jakob Memorial Award (2010); James Harry Potter Gold Medal (2005); Thermophysics Award (1998); Transfer Memorial Award (1998)
- Scientific career
- Fields: Mechanical engineering
- Workplaces: University of California, Los Angeles; University of Connecticut; University of California, Berkeley; Oregon State University; Wright State University
- Doctoral advisor: Ralph A. Seban

Amir Faghri is an American professor and leader in the engineering profession as an educator, scientist, administrator, and CEO. He is the CEO and Founder of ScholarGPS. Faghri holds the titles of Distinguished Professor Emeritus of Engineering and Distinguished Dean Emeritus at the University of Connecticut. Additionally, he also serves as a Distinguished Adjunct Professor at the University of California, Los Angeles. Faghri served as Head of the Mechanical Engineering Department from 1994 to 1998, and Dean of the School of Engineering at the University of Connecticut from 1998 to 2006. Faghri also serves on the board of directors of RBC Bearings Incorporated, a publicly traded company listed on the New York Stock Exchange (NYSE). Faghri is well known for his contributions to the field of heat transfer. He is the world's leading expert in the area of heat pipes and a major contributor to thermal-fluids engineering in multiphase heat transfer.

== Education ==
Amir Faghri received his M.S. and Ph.D. degrees in Mechanical Engineering from the University of California, Berkeley in 1974 and 1976, respectively. He received his B.S. degree from Oregon State University with highest honors in 1973.

== Technical contributions ==
Faghri is the author of six books and has published more than 350 archival technical publications, including 245 journal papers. He holds fiften U.S. patents related to heat pipes, energy storage devices, and fuel cells. Faghri serves on the editorial boards of eight scientific journals, including the International Journal of Heat and Mass Transfer, the International Communications in Heat and Mass Transfer, Heat Transfer Engineering, and Frontiers in Heat and Mass Transfer in roles such as executive editor, editor-in-chief, founding editor, and honorary editorial board member. In the 1980s, he unraveled complex thermal problems, including convection in the presence of phase-change materials for thermal energy storage in space. This breakthrough led to a more rational design of cooling systems for NASA. In the 1990s, he developed high heat flux miniature heat pipes for commercial cooling of laptop computer chips, which have been a principal contributor to the ubiquitous presence of heat pipes for cooling microprocessors in present-day laptop computers.

== Career ==
Amir Faghri started his academic career at Aryamehr University (now Sharif University of Technology) in 1976. He was one of the founding faculty members and administrators who established Isfahan University of Technology in 1977. He served on the faculty of IUT until 1980 as the founding director of its Energy Division (now separated into the Mechanical Engineering and Chemical Engineering Departments). In 1981, he joined the University of California, Berkeley as a visiting professor to teach thermal and energy courses. Following Berkeley, Faghri joined the faculty of Wright State University in 1982 and was promoted to Brage Golding Distinguished Professor in 1989. He developed a nationally recognized heat transfer group and laboratory at WSU, interacting extensively with NASA.

Faghri joined the University of Connecticut in 1994 and served as Head of the Mechanical Engineering Department from 1994 to 1998, United Technologies Corporation Chair Professor in Thermal-Fluids Engineering from 2004 to 2010, and Dean of the School of Engineering from 1998 to 2006. During his tenure as Dean, he attracted corporate and alumni support to establish 17 endowed professorships, including 11 chair professorships. He increased total enrollment by 106%, increased the number of merit scholarships by approximately 200%, and added three new buildings/facilities. He also doubled the number of undergraduate degree programs from 6 to 12. Faghri was the founder of the Connecticut Global Fuel Cell Center (renamed later as the Center for Clean Energy Engineering) at the University of Connecticut. Faghri joined the University of California, Los Angeles in 2022. Faghri was elected as a director of the public Company RBC Bearings Incorporated in May 2022.

== Honors and awards ==
Amir Faghri has received many national and international honors and awards, including the American Institute of Aeronautics and Astronautics Thermophysics Award in 1998, the American Society of Mechanical Engineers Heat Transfer Memorial Award in 1998, the ASME James Harry Potter Gold Medal in 2005, and the ASME/AIChE Max Jakob Memorial Award in 2010, which is considered the highest honor in the field of heat transfer. Faghri has been a longtime fellow of the ASME and an elected member of the Connecticut Academy of Science and Engineering. He was also inducted to the Oregon State University Council of Distinguished Engineers in 1999. He was the recipient of the George Grover Medal that was given at the 19th International Heat Pipe Conference in Pisa, Italy in June 2018. In 2019, he was elected as an Honorary Member of the American Society of Mechanical Engineers to recognize his distinguished service that contributes significantly to the attainment of the goals of the engineering profession. He has achieved the Number 1 lifetime ranking among all scholars worldwide in heat pipes by ScholarGPS.

== Books ==
Faghri has authored six books:

1. Faghri, A., and Zhang, Y., (2020), Fundamentals of Multiphase Heat Transfer and Flow, ISBN 978-3-030-22136-2, Springer Nature Switzerland AG.
2. Faghri, A (2016), Heat Pipe Science and Technology, Second edition, Global Digital Press.
3. Faghri, A., Zhang, Y., and Howell, J. R. (2010). Advanced Heat and Mass Transfer. Global Digital Press, Columbia, MO. ISBN 978-0-9842760-0-4
4. Faghri, A., and Zhang, Y. (2006). Transport Phenomena in Multiphase Systems. Elsevier Academic Press. ISBN 978-0-12-370610-2
5. Faghri, A. (1995). Heat Pipe Science and Technology. Taylor & Francis Inc. ISBN 978-1-56032-383-9
6. Faghri, A. (1991). Thermal Science Measurements. Kendall/Hunt Publishing Company. ISBN 978-0-8403-6802-7

His signature work, Heat Pipe Science and Technology, ranks as the most widely cited book on the subject of heat pipes by Google Scholar. His textbook, Transport Phenomena in Multiphase Systems, presented, for the first time, a unified fundamental treatise on all three forms of phase change — boiling and evaporation, melting and solidification, and sublimation and vapor deposition. His latest textbook, Advanced Heat and Mass Transfer, covers the subject of heat and mass transfer with a focus on the recent advances in the field.
