= Michael F. Modest =

German-American mechanical engineer

- Born: 1944 (age 81–82); Berlin, Germany
- Education: Technical University of Munich; University of California, Berkeley
- Known for: Radiative heat transfer
- Awards: Max Jakob Memorial Award (2021); ASME Honorary Member (2017); AIAA Thermophysics Award (2008); Humboldt Research Award (2007)
- Scientific career
- Fields: Mechanical engineering
- Workplaces: Pennsylvania State University; University of California, Merced

Michael F. Modest (born 1944) is a German-born American mechanical engineer known for his contributions to radiative heat transfer and thermal sciences. His work has advanced the understanding of radiation in high-temperature and combustion systems.

He is Distinguished Professor Emeritus of Mechanical Engineering at the University of California, Merced and previously served as Distinguished Professor at Pennsylvania State University.

== Education ==
Modest received a Dipl.-Ing. degree in mechanical engineering from the Technical University of Munich in 1968 and completed his M.S. and Ph.D. at the University of California, Berkeley in 1972.

== Career ==
Following a postdoctoral appointment at NASA Johnson Space Center, Modest held academic positions at San Francisco State University, Rensselaer Polytechnic Institute, and the University of Southern California.

In 1987, he joined Pennsylvania State University, where he served for more than two decades and was named Distinguished Professor of Mechanical Engineering. In 2009, he joined the University of California, Merced as the Shaffer and George Distinguished Professor of Engineering, later receiving emeritus status.

== Research ==
Modest’s research focuses on radiative heat transfer, combustion radiation, and laser–material interactions. His work includes experimental measurement of radiative properties of materials and development of numerical methods, including Monte Carlo techniques, for solving radiative transfer problems.

He has made contributions to the modeling of turbulence–radiation interactions in combustion systems and high-temperature gases.

Modest is the author of the textbook Radiative Heat Transfer, first published in 1993 with subsequent editions in 2003, 2013, and 2021. He is also the author of Introduction to Radiative Heat Transfer (2025), a text covering the fundamentals of thermal radiation and its applications.

== Honors and awards ==
- Max Jakob Memorial Award (2021), awarded jointly by the American Society of Mechanical Engineers and the American Institute of Chemical Engineers for outstanding contributions to heat transfer
- Honorary Member of the American Society of Mechanical Engineers (2017)
- AIAA Thermophysics Award (2008), awarded by the American Institute of Aeronautics and Astronautics for contributions to thermophysics, including thermal radiation and laser processing
- Humboldt Research Award (2007)
- ASME Heat Transfer Memorial Award (2005)
- Fellow of the American Society of Mechanical Engineers.

== Publications ==
- Modest, M. F. Radiative Heat Transfer (1993; subsequent editions 2003, 2013, 2021)
- Modest, M. F. Introduction to Radiative Heat Transfer. Academic Press, 2025. ISBN 978-0443266485
- Modest, M. F.; Haworth, D. C. Radiative Heat Transfer in Turbulent Combustion Systems. Springer, 2015
