= Warner Library =

Warner Library may refer to:

- Warner Library in Tarrytown, New York
- The former Warner Library at Trent College in Derbyshire, England
