= P. S. Ayyaswamy =

American mechanical engineer

P.S. Ayyaswamy
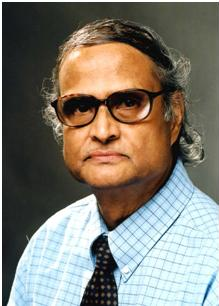
- Born: March 21, 1942 (age 84); Bangalore, India
- Education: University of Mysore, India, Columbia University, NY, University of California, Los Angeles
- Known for: Multiphase flows and Transport, Bio Heat/Mass Transfer, Ionized Plasma Transport
- Scientific career
- Fields: Heat Transfer, Mass Transfer, Fluid Mechanics
- Workplaces: University of Pennsylvania,

Notes
- He holds the Asa Whitney Endowed chair at the University of Pennsylvania

Portonovo S. Ayyaswamy (born March 21, 1942) is an Indian-born-American mechanical engineer, the Asa Whitney Professor of Dynamical Engineering at the University of Pennsylvania, Philadelphia, USA, and inventor.

He is known for his work on phase-change heat/mass transfer with droplets and bubbles, multi-phase flows, buoyancy-driven transport, and ionized arc-plasma transport with applications in condensation, combustion, microelectronic packaging, and micro-/macro-biological systems. He is the recipient of the 2014 Max Jakob Memorial Award.

== Biography ==
=== Youth, education and academic career ===
Ayyaswamy was born in Bangalore, India in 1942, and became a US citizen in 1975. He earned his B.E. in 1962 from University of Mysore, India. Next he obtained his M.S. in 1965, and his M.E. in 1967, both from Columbia University. In 1971 he obtained his PhD in Mechanical Engineering from the University of California, Los Angeles.

From 1971 to 1973 he was a post-doctoral scholar at University of California, Los Angeles, where he conducted research on capillary flows in grooved surfaces, large scale safety of nuclear reactors and bounding theories in turbulence. He then joined the faculty of the University of Pennsylvania late 1974 as assistant professor of mechanical engineering, and rose through the ranks and now is the Asa Whitney Professor of Mechanical Engineering.

=== Awards honours and other activities ===
Ayyaswamy has won many awards for his research. His national and international awards and honors include ASME 2007 Worcester Reed Warner Medal, ASME 2001 Heat Transfer Memorial Award in the Science Category, Council of Indian Organizations Award, ASME Outstanding Faculty Advisor Award, Am. Inst. Aeronautics and Astronautics Aerospace Professional of the Year (1997) award,

He was also elected Panelist for Review of NASA Strategic Roadmaps: Space Station Panel (2005), Elected Fellow of ASME (1990) and visiting professor of Dept. of Mech. Eng., University of California, Berkeley, CA (2000).

Ayyaswamy has also won several teaching awards which include Lindback Award and Reid Warren Award for Distinguished Teaching.

== Selected publications ==
- Sadhal, Satwindar; Ayyaswamy, Portonovo S.; Chung, Jacob N. (October 25, 1996). Transport Phenomena with Drops and Bubbles. New York Heidelberg: Springer. ISBN 978-0-387-94678-8.

Articles, a selection

- Ayyaswamy, P. S.; Catton, I.; Edwards, D. K. (June 1, 1974). "Capillary Flow in Triangular Grooves". Journal of Applied Mechanics. 41 (2): 332–336. Bibcode:1974JAM....41..332A. doi:10.1115/1.3423288. ISSN 0021-8936.
- Catton, Ivan; Ayyaswamy, P.S.; Clever, R.M. (1974). "Natural convection flow in a finite, rectangular slot arbitrarily oriented with respect to the gravity vector". International Journal of Heat and Mass Transfer. 17 (2): 173–184. Bibcode:1974IJHMT..17..173C. doi:10.1016/0017-9310(74)90079-9.
- Baish, J. W.; Ayyaswamy, P. S.; Foster, K. R. (November 1, 1986). "Heat Transport Mechanisms in Vascular Tissues: A Model Comparison". Journal of Biomechanical Engineering. 108 (4): 324–331. doi:10.1115/1.3138623. ISSN 0148-0731. PMID 3795877.
- Qiu, Qing-Qing; Ducheyne, Paul; Ayyaswamy, Portonovo S. (1999). "Fabrication, characterization and evaluation of bioceramic hollow microspheres used as microcarriers for 3-D bone tissue formation in rotating bioreactors". Biomaterials. 20 (11): 989–1001. doi:10.1016/S0142-9612(98)00183-5. PMID 10378799.

Patents

- Ducheyne, Paul, Portonovo S. Ayyaswamy, and Qing-Qing Qiu. "Bioactive, degradable composite for tissue engineering." U.S. Patent No. 6,328,990. Dec. 11, 2001.
- Radin, S., Ducheyne, P., Falaize, S., & Ayyaswamy, P. S. "Hollow bone mineral-like calcium phosphate particles." U.S. Patent No. 6,416,774. Dec. 11, 2001.
