= Je-Chin Han =

- Born: Kaohsiung, Taiwan
- Education: National Taiwan University (BS); Lehigh University (MS); Massachusetts Institute of Technology (DSc)
- Scientific career
- Fields: Mechanical Engineering
- Institutions: Texas A&M University

Je-Chin Han (Chinese: 黃界清) is a Taiwanese-American thermal engineer, academic, and author. He is a distinguished professor and the Marcus Easterling Endowed Chair Professor at Texas A&M University.

Han's research interests have included the computational and experimental frameworks in convection heat transfer, with a focus on film cooling, heat transfer enhancement, and rotating cooling flows.

Han is a fellow of the American Institute of Aeronautics and Astronautics and American Association for the Advancement of Science as well as an honorary member of the American Society of Mechanical Engineers (ASME). In 2002, he received the ASME Heat Transfer Memorial Award.

== Education ==
Han graduated from National Taiwan University with a B.S. in mechanical engineering in 1970. He then earned an M.S. in mechanical engineering from Lehigh University in 1973 and his Doctor of Science (D.Sc.) in mechanical engineering from the Massachusetts Institute of Technology (MIT) in 1976.

== Career ==
Han began his career as a second lieutenant in the Army of Taiwan from 1970 to 1971. Subsequently, he assumed the teaching assistant position at National Taiwan University, which he retained until 1972. He was a research assistant at Lehigh University from 1972 to 1973 and at Massachusetts Institute of Technology from 1974 to 1976. From 1977 to 1978, he was an associate professor at National Tsing Hua University.

Han joined Texas A&M University in 1980 as assistant professor, becoming associate professor in 1984 and full professor in 1989. During this time was a Halliburton Professor between 1991 and 1992 and an HTRI Endowed Professor from 1993 to 2001. Since 1993, he has been director of the Turbine Heat Transfer Laboratory. In 2001, he received the Endowment Professor of the Marcus C. Easterling Chair. Since 2006, he has also been University Distinguished Professor.

Han retired from his faculty position in August 2025. In 2026, the JC Han 80th Birthday Symposium was organized in honor of him during the ASME Summer Heat Transfer Conference 2026, held at the Hyatt Regency Bellevue from 26–29 July 2026. Organized by the K14 Gas Turbine Heat Transfer Technical Committee, the symposium recognized Han’s nearly five decades of contributions to gas turbine heat transfer, internal cooling channel design, film cooling, and experimental heat transfer techniques, including liquid crystal methods and pressure-sensitive paint measurements. The symposium featured research on gas turbine cooling systems, heat transfer enhancement, and experimental measurement methods. Selected papers from the symposium were considered for publication in a special issue of the ASME Journal of Thermal Science and Engineering Applications.

== Research ==
Han's research has primarily focused on thermal efficiency in turbine cooling systems by manipulating flow dynamics and rib geometry to maximize heat transfer performance. In a collaborative study, he documented that rib-roughened surfaces, along with rib shape, spacing, and angle, particularly 45°, improved heat transfer relative to friction, outperforming both 90° ribs and sand-grain roughness. He also examined turbulent air flow in square ducts with rib-roughened walls, confirming that rib pitch-to-height and rib height-to-diameter ratios predicted friction and heat transfer.

Han also observed the effects of channel aspect ratio on heat transfer and friction in ribbed rectangular channels to streamline the design of the cooling passage for turbine airfoils across a range of Reynolds numbers. Moreover, he co-investigated how rib angle orientation affected pressure drop and heat transfer in square channels, documenting that while ∧-shaped ribs produced the highest pressure drop, V-shaped ribs improved heat transfer.

== Awards and honors ==
- 2002 – ASME Heat Transfer Memorial Award, ASME
- 2004 – AIAA Thermo-physics Award, American Institute of Aeronautics and Astronautics
- 2013 – 75th Anniversary Medal, ASME Heat Transfer Division
- 2016 – Max Jakob Memorial Award, ASME
- 2016 – IGTI Aircraft Engine Technology Award, ASME
- 2016 – Fellow, American Institute of Aeronautics and Astronautics
- 2020 – Honorary Member, ASME
- 2023 – Fellow, American Association for the Advancement of Science (AAAS)

== Bibliography ==
=== Books ===
- Han, Je-Chin; Dutta, Sandip; Ekkad, Srinath (2012). Gas Turbine Heat Transfer and Cooling Technology. CRC Press. ISBN 9781466564909.
- Han, Je-Chin; Wright, Lesley M. (2020). Experimental Methods in Heat Transfer and Fluid Mechanics. CRC Press. ISBN 9781000072167.
- Han, Je-Chin; Wright, Lesley (2022). Analytical Heat Transfer. CRC Press. ISBN 9781000597295.

=== Selected articles ===
- Han, J. C.; Glicksman, L. R.; Rohsenow, W. M. (1978). "An investigation of heat transfer and friction for rib-roughened surfaces". International Journal of Heat and Mass Transfer. 21 (8): 1143–1156. Bibcode:1978IJHMT..21.1143H. doi:10.1016/0017-9310(78)90113-8.
- Han, J. C. (1984). "Heat transfer and friction in channels with two opposite rib-roughened walls". Journal of Heat Transfer. 106 (4): 774–781. doi:10.1115/1.3246751.
- Han, J. C.; Park, J. S. (1988). "Developing heat transfer in rectangular channels with rib turbulators". International Journal of Heat and Mass Transfer. 31 (1): 183–195. Bibcode:1988IJHMT..31..183H. doi:10.1016/0017-9310(88)90235-9.
- Ekkad, S. V.; Han, J. C. (2000). "A transient liquid crystal thermography technique for gas turbine heattransfer measurements". Measurement Science and Technology. 11 (7): 957–968. Bibcode:2000MeScT..11..957E. doi:10.1088/0957-0233/11/7/312.
- Han, J. C.; Rallabandi, A. P. (2010). "Turbine blade film cooling using PSP technique". Frontiers in Heat and Mass Transfer. 1 (1): 013001. doi:10.5098/hmt.v1.1.3001.
