= Worcester Reed Warner =

American engineer (1846–1929)

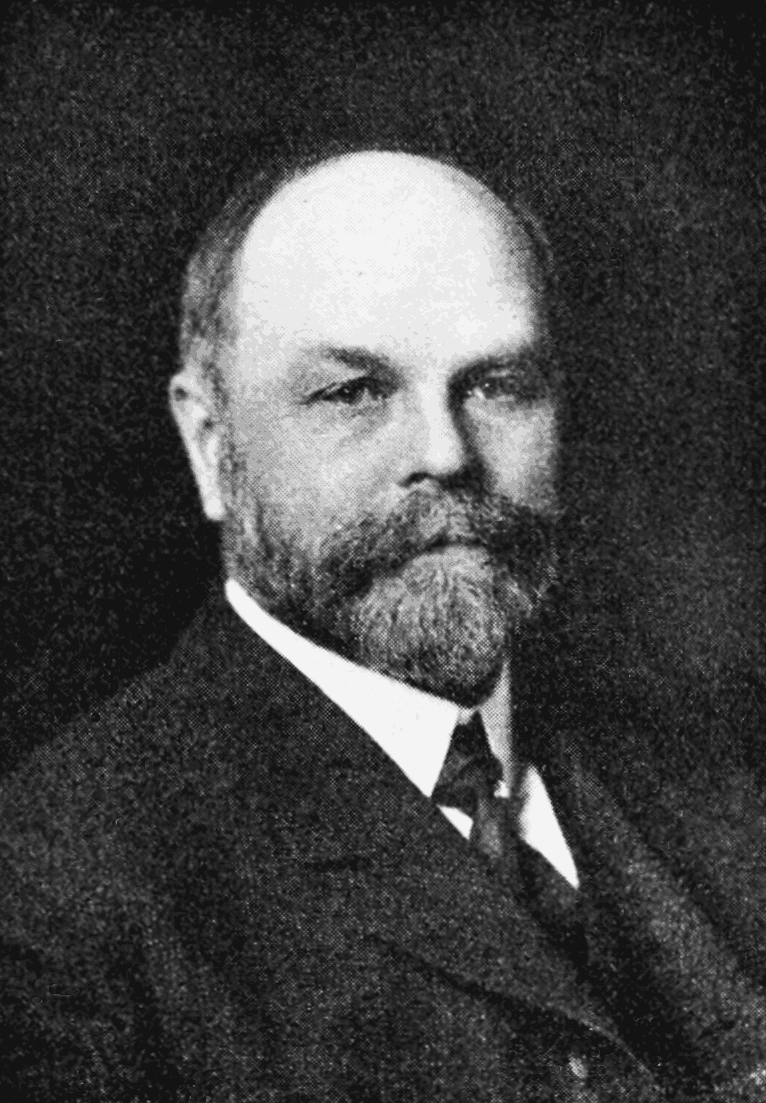
- Born: May 16, 1846; Cummington, Massachusetts, US
- Died: June 25, 1929 (aged 83); Eisenach, Germany
- Resting place: Sleepy Hollow Cemetery, Sleepy Hollow, New York
- Occupations: Machinist, inventor, manager, entrepreneur
- Known for: Co-founder of the Warner & Swasey Company

Worcester Reed Warner (May 16, 1846 – June 25, 1929) was an American mechanical engineer, entrepreneur, manager, astronomer, and philanthropist. With Ambrose Swasey he cofounded the Warner & Swasey Company. The crater Warner on the Moon is named after him.

== Biography ==
=== Life and career ===
Warner was born and grew up on a farm near Cummington, Massachusetts. He met Swasey at the Exeter Machine Works where both were apprentices. In 1870, both entered the employ of Pratt & Whitney in Hartford, Connecticut.

In 1880, Warner and Swasey co-founded a business to manufacture sewing machines and lathes, but quickly turned to manufacturing telescopes, because Warner was always interested in astronomy. The firm, Warner & Swasey, was initially located in Chicago but soon moved to Cleveland. In 1880, Beloit College purchased one of its telescopes, which helped establish the company's name in the telescope-building industry, which experienced rapid growth at the time. Warner & Swasey would design and build the framework and the mounting for the 36-inch refracting telescope installed at Lick Observatory in 1888, which was the world's largest refractor telescope at the time. The company later built telescopes that were used in Canada and Argentina.

The company and its founders prospered, but not from telescope-building. While it was astronomical telescopes that made Warner & Swasey famous, its profits came from machine tools, especially turret lathes, and military instruments. Telescope-making "essentially amounted to astronomical philanthropy," rooted in the founders' life-long interest in astronomy. The company's 50th-anniversary book describes the firm's giant-telescope-building work as unprofitable overall but a labor of technological love.

=== Further activities ===
Warner was a charter member of the American Society of Mechanical Engineers (ASME), and from 1897 to 1898 he served as the 16th president of ASME. (Ambrose Swasey would later serve as the 23rd ASME president.) In 1900 the firm was incorporated as Warner & Swasey Company. Warner served as president and chairman of the board, but retired in 1911. ASME elected him an honorary member in 1925.

Both Warner and Ambrose Swasey also became trustees of the Case School of Applied Science. They donated to the school their private observatory, which they had built between their neighboring houses in East Cleveland. Relocated to a new building, this became the Warner and Swasey Observatory. It was dedicated in 1920. The Warner Building on Case Western Reserve University houses the Worcester Reed Warner Laboratory, named after the former university trustee. The construction of this building was partly funded by Worcester Warner.

=== Warner Library ===
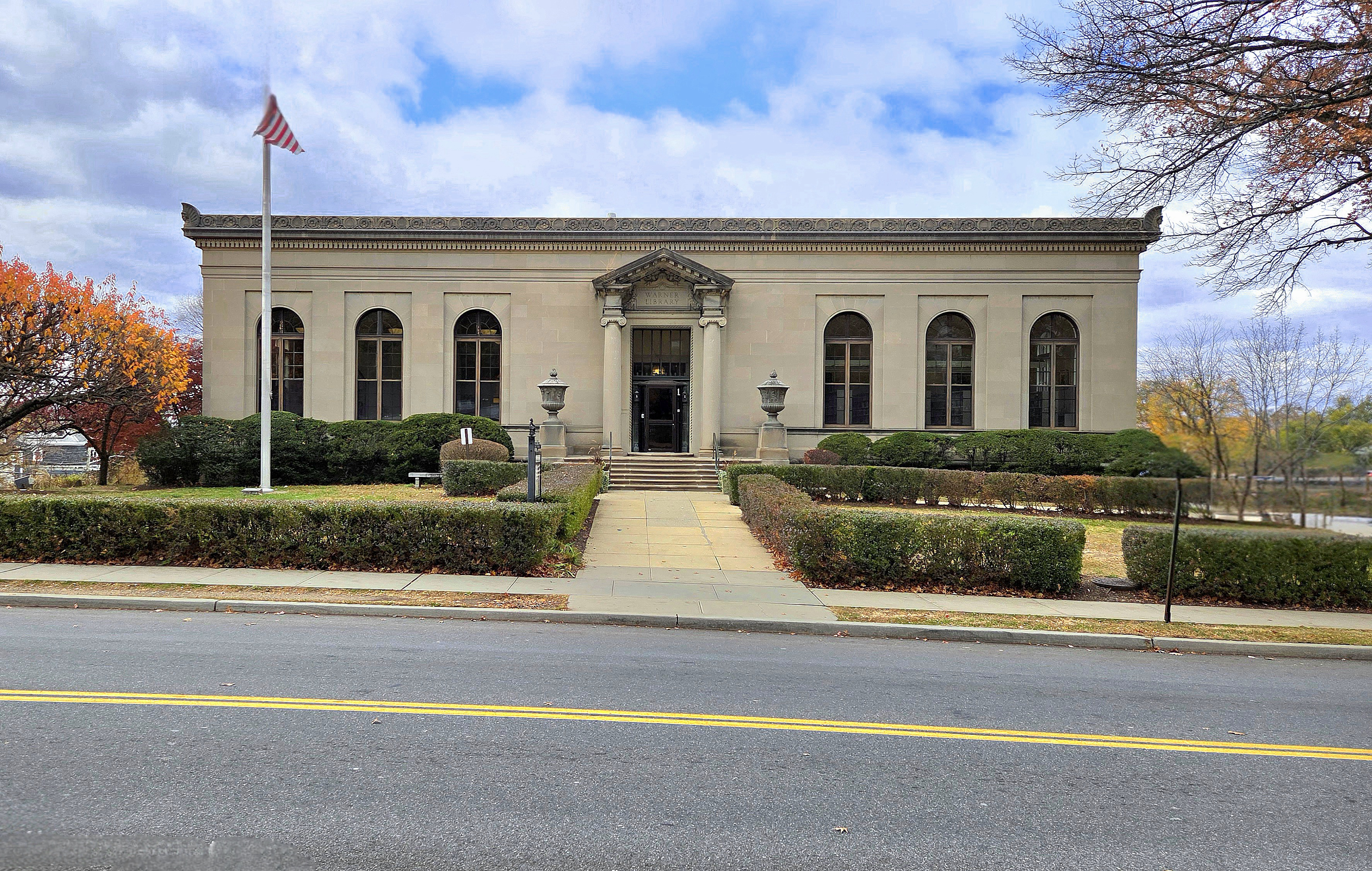
Warner Library in Tarrytown, New York

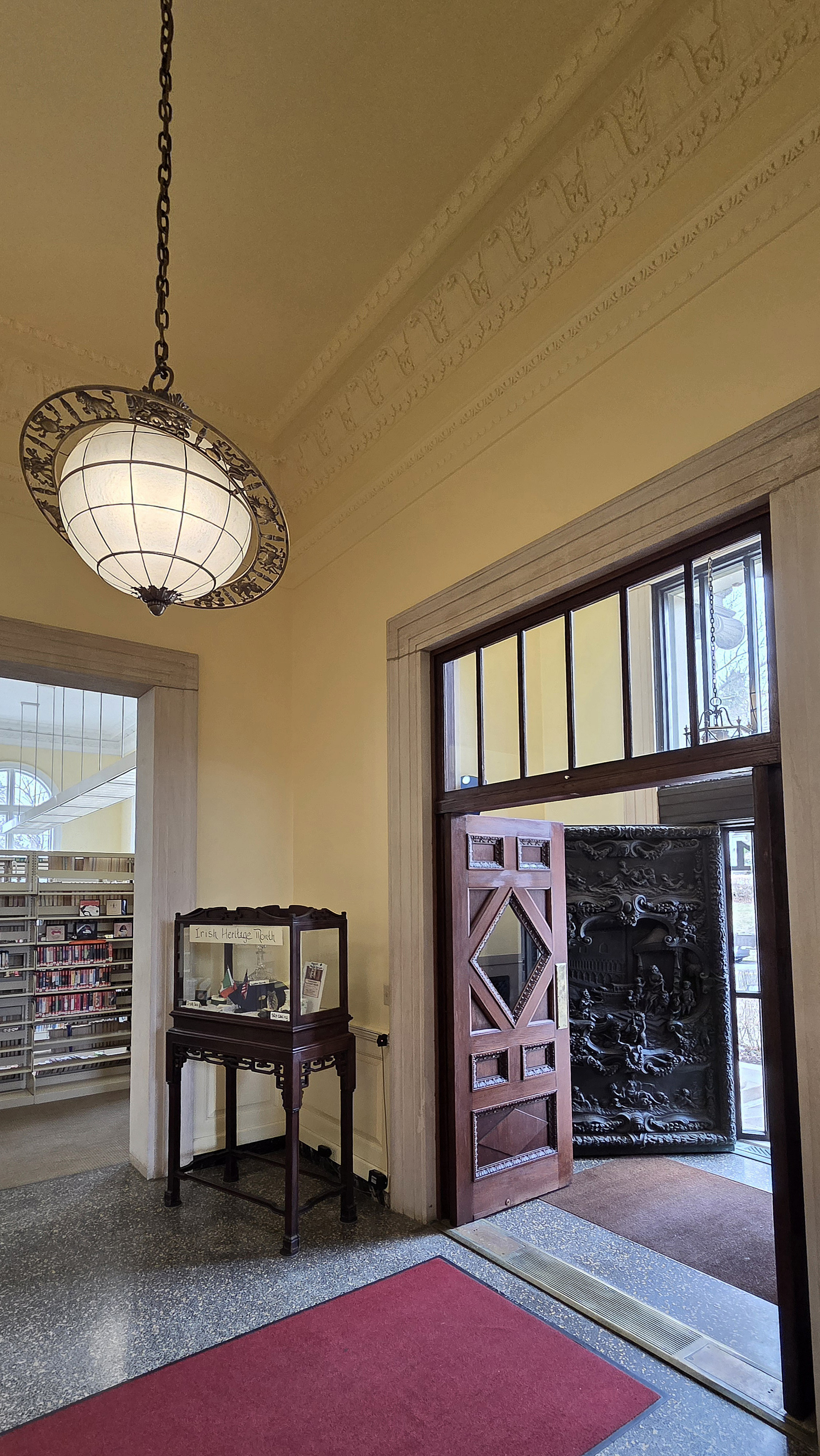
Entrance hall of Warner Library, with the Florentine-panel door and the light fixture designed by Warner

Portrait of Worcester Reed Warner by Margaret Leslie Bush-Brown, Warner Library

In 1911, Warner and his family moved to an estate named Wilholm in the Wilson Park neighborhood of Tarrytown, New York. Warner built a celestial observatory in his house, where he regularly invited guests for stargazing sessions. One of those guests was John D. Rockefeller, a neighbor and close friend. Warner was also a close friend of President Herbert Hoover, a fellow member of the American Society of Mechanical Engineers.

The Warner Library in Tarrytown has served Tarrytown and the neighboring Sleepy Hollow since 1929. It was built and gifted to the two communities by Warner and his wife, Cornelia. Constructed of Vermont limestone, the Neoclassical building was designed by Walter Dabney Blair, a renowned architect who also lived in Tarrytown. The library differs greatly from the many Carnegie libraries built during the same period across America, whose simplified design was guided by efficiency considerations. The Warners and Blair opted for intricate scrollwork, fifteen-foot windows, Ionic columns, Grecian figural urns flanking the entrance, and an oculus in the lobby ceiling inspired by the Roman Pantheon.

Warner himself designed the custom brace and hinges that support the bronze, 1,000-pound Florentine panel used as the front door (it was purchased by the Warners in Italy and transported to Tarrytown). A precision-instrument engineer, he specifically devised them so that the heavy door could be opened easily with a single finger. He also designed the decorative electric light fixture, a celestial globe encircled by the signs of the zodiac, that illuminates the library's entrance hall.

The library cost $250,000 (approximately $4,700,000 in today's value as of 2025) to build, and the Warners further endowed it with $50,000 (some $950,000 in today's value as of 2025) for the purchase of books. Warner articulated the library’s mission as follows: "The measure of any community’s culture ... is the books it has and reads. Therefore, helpful books should be made accessible to all."

=== Family ===
In 1890, he married Cornelia Blakemore of Philadelphia, who shared his passion for philanthropy. They had three children, two of whom died at a very young age.

He was survived by daughter, Helen Blakemore Warner (1894-1971), who applied her large inheritance to continuing her father's philanthropic legacy. Alongside a family friend, John D. Rockefeller Jr., she played a major role in the saving and restoring of the historic Philipsburg Manor House in Sleepy Hollow. She established the prestigious Helen B. Warner Prize for Astronomy, awarded annually by the American Astronomical Society. In memory of her father, who was born in Cummington, Massachusetts, she founded the Cummington Museum, now known as the Kingman Tavern Historical Museum. She was also a benefactor of the Cleveland Museum of Art and the Phelps Hospital.

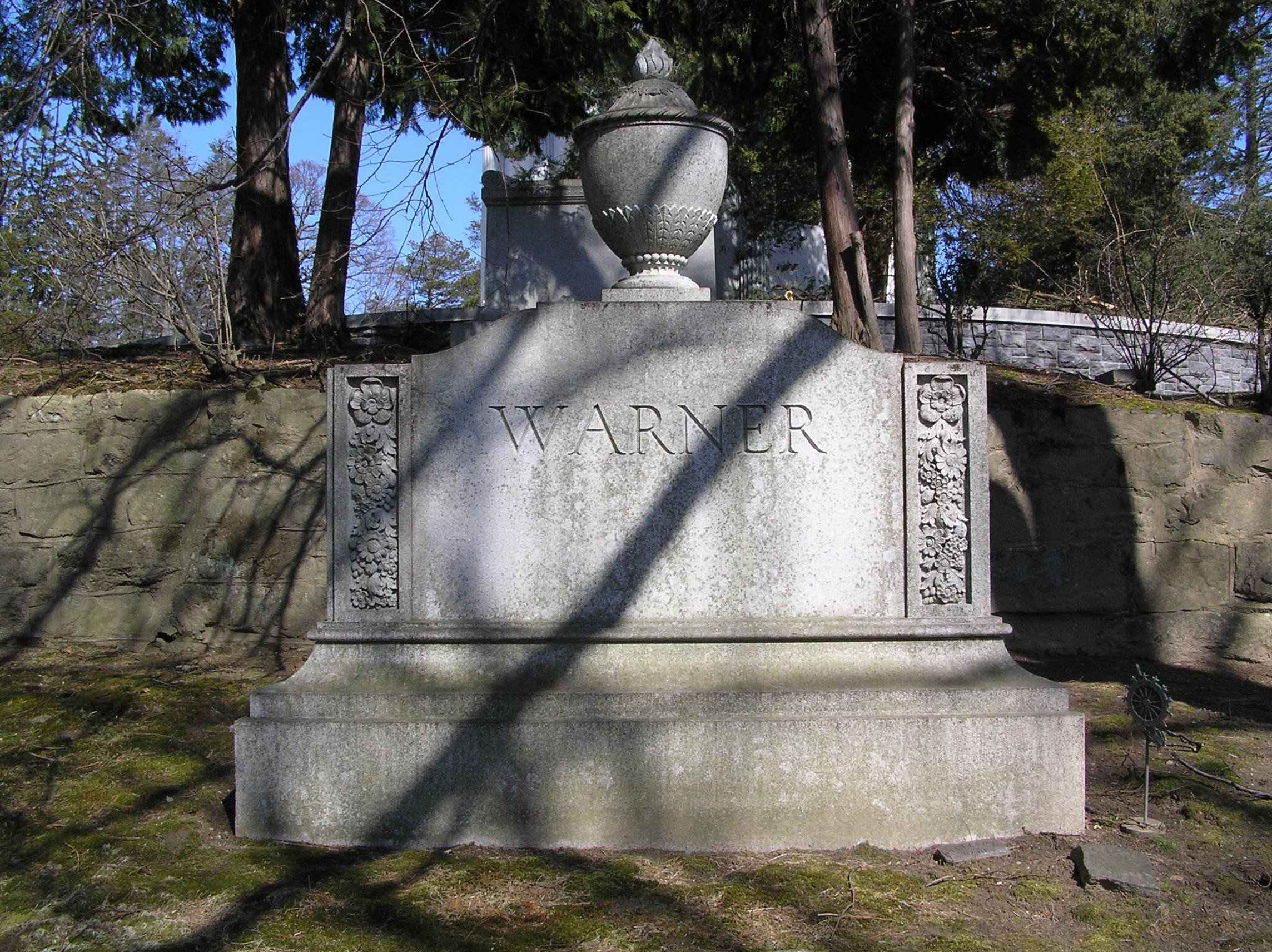
The gravesite of Worcester Reed Warner

=== Death ===
Warner died on a trip in Eisenach, Saxe-Weimar, Germany, four months after the Warner Library in Tarrytown was dedicated in his name. He is buried in the historic Sleepy Hollow Cemetery.

== Worcester Reed Warner Medal ==
The Worcester Reed Warner Medal is awarded by the ASME for "outstanding contribution to the permanent literature of engineering". It was established by Warner's bequest in 1930. Some of the recipients are:

- 1933: Dexter S. Kimball
- 1934: Ralph Flanders
- 1935: Stephen Timoshenko
- 1943: Igor Sikorsky
- 1945: Joseph M. Juran
- 1947: Arpad L. Nadai
- 1949: Fred B. Seely
- 1951: Jacob Pieter Den Hartog
- 1954: Joseph Henry Keenan
- 1956: James Keith Louden
- 1957: William Prager
- 1960: Lloyd H. Donnell
- 1965: Ascher H. Shapiro
- 1967: Nicholas J. Hoff
- 1969: Hans W. Liepmann
- 1970: Wilhelm Flügge
- 1971: Stephen H. Crandall
- 1975: Philip G. Hodge, Jr.
- 1979: Darle W. Dudley
- 1980: Olgierd Zienkiewicz
- 1984: Yuan-Cheng Fung
- 1985: Richard H. Gallagher
- 1990: J. Tinsley Oden
- 1992: J. N. Reddy
- 1997: Zdenek P. Bazant
- 1998: Thomas J. R. Hughes
- 1999: Yogesh Jaluria
- 2007: Portonovo Ayyaswamy
- 2016: Isaac Elishakoff
- 2017: Michael Paidoussis
- 2018: Martin Ostoja-Starzewski
- 2019: Arun Srinivasa
- 2020: Marco Amabili
- 2021: Hanqing Jiang
- 2022: K. R. Rajagopal

== Bibliography ==
- Warner & Swasey Company (1920), The Warner & Swasey Company, 1880-1920, Cleveland, Ohio, US: Warner & Swasey Company.
- Warner & Swasey Company (1930), The Warner & Swasey Company, 1880-1930, Cleveland, Ohio, US: Warner & Swasey Company.
- Finding aid for Worcester Reed Warner and Ambrose Swasey personal papers at Case Western Reserve University
