= Lydia Bush-Brown =

American painter and designer

- Born: Lydia Bush-Brown; 1887; Florence, Italy
- Died: 1984 (aged 96–97)
- Education: Pratt Institute
- Known for: Batik
- Spouse: Francis Head (m. 1926-1947; his death)

Lydia Bush-Brown Head (1887–1984) was an American visual artist, known to work as a painter and designer. She is best known for her silk batik wall hangings.

== Biography ==
Born in Florence, Italy, Lydia Bush-Brown was the daughter of sculptor Henry Kirke Bush-Brown and his wife, the painter Margaret Lesley.

She grew up near Newburgh, New York, prior to attending Pratt Institute from 1906 until 1908. She also studied with Ralph Johonnot before keeping a studio in Greenwich Village until 1911. She then moved for a time to Washington, D.C., returning permanently to New York City in 1919. In 1926, she married Francis Head (d. 1947).

Head was best known for her silk batik wall-hangings, but she also created paintings. She directed art programs for the Luther Gulick Camps and the Camp Fire Girls. During World War I Head served as an occupational therapist, also known as Reconstruction Aides for the wounded in both France and the United States.

She traveled widely, which provided the source for many of her subjects, and she exhibited throughout the United States and abroad during her career. She belonged to the Arts and Crafts Society of New York City, the National Arts Club, the Civic Club, the Arts Club of Washington, the Philadelphia Art Alliance, and the Arts and Crafts Society of Boston.

Head donated a number of items to the Cooper Hewitt National Museum of Design of the Smithsonian Institution, and a number of her pieces are in the collection as well, donated by others. Between 1968 and 1978 she donated a collection of her family's papers to Smith College.
