= Max Jakob Memorial Award =

The Max Jakob Memorial Award recognizes an 'eminent scholarly achievement and distinguished leadership' in the field of heat transfer. Awarded annually (Note: In the event that no nominee meets the requisite criteria in any given year, the award shall not be conferred.) to a scholar by the American Society of Mechanical Engineers (ASME) and the American Institute of Chemical Engineers (AIChE), it is the highest honor in the field of heat transfer these professional organizations bestow.

The award was established in 1961 by the American Society of Mechanical Engineering Heat Transfer Division in honor of Max Jakob, a pioneer in the science of heat transfer, commemorating his influential contributions as a research worker, educator, and author. In 1962, the AIChE joined the ASME in presenting the award. It is administered though the Max Jakob Memorial Award Committee, a board composed of three members from each of the two major professional organizations, as well as the Past Chair of the committee.

The award is presented annually, without regard to society affiliation or nationality. It consists of a bronze plaque, an engraved certificate, an honorarium, and travel expenses to accept the award. Each year the recipient also presents the Max Jakob Award Lecture as part of the annual America Society of Mechanical Engineering National Heat Transfer Conference.

== Recipients ==
- 2024 Walter Grassi, Italy
- 2022 G.P. “Bud” Peterson, United States
- 2021 Michael Modest, United States
- 2020 Peter Wayner Jr., United States
- 2019 Arun Majumdar, United States
- 2018 John W. Rose, United Kingdom
- 2016 Je-Chin Han, United States
- 2014 P. S. Ayyaswamy, United States
- 2013 Kenneth R. Diller, United States
- 2012 Wataru Nakayama, Japan
- 2011 Dimos Poulikakos, Switzerland
- 2010 Amir Faghri, United States
- 2009 Ivan Catton, United States
- 2008 Suhas Patankar, United States
- 2007 Wen-Jei Yang, United States
- 2006 Kwang-Tzu Yang, United States
- 2005 Ping Cheng, China
- 2004 Vijay K. Dhir, United States
- 2003 Kenneth J. Bell, United States
- 2002 Yogesh Jaluria, United States
- 2001 John C. Chen, United States
- 2000 Vedat Arpaci, United States
- 1999 Adrian Bejan, United States
- 1998 Alexander I. Leontiev, Russia
- 1997 John R. Howell, United States
- 1996 Robert Siegel, United States
- 1995 Arthur E. Bergles, United States
- 1994 Geoffrey F. Hewitt, United Kingdom
- 1993 Benjamin Gebhart, United States
- 1992 William M. Kays, United States
- 1991 Franz X. Mayinger, Germany
- 1990 Richard J. Goldstein, United States
- 1989 James P. Hartnett, United States
- 1988 Yasuo Mori, Japan
- 1987 S. George Bankoff, United States
- 1986 Raymond Viskanta, United States
- 1985 Frank Kreith, United States
- 1984 Alexander Louis London, United States
- 1983 Bei Tse Chao, United States
- 1982 Simon Ostrach, United States
- 1981 Chang-Lin Tien, United States
- 1980 Ralph A. Seban, United States
- 1979 Stuart W. Churchill, United States
- 1978 Niichi Nishiwaki, Japan
- 1977 D. Brian Spalding, United Kingdom
- 1976 Ephraim M. Sparrow, United States
- 1975 Robert G. Deissler, United States
- 1974 Peter Grassmann, Switzerland
- 1973 Ulrich Grigull, Germany
- 1972 Karl A. Gardner, United States
- 1971 James W. Westwater, United States
- 1970 Warren M. Rohsenow, United States
- 1969 Samson Kutateladze, U.S.S.R.
- 1968 Shiro Nukiyama, Japan
- 1967 Thomas B. Drew, United States
- 1966 Sir Owen Saunders, United Kingdom
- 1965 Hoyt C. Hottel, United States
- 1964 Ernst Schmidt, Germany
- 1963 William H. McAdams, United States
- 1962 Llewellyn M.K. Boelter, United States
- 1961 Ernst R. G. Eckert, United States

== See also ==
- List of engineering awards
- List of mechanical engineering awards
