= International Journal of Heat and Mass Transfer =

- Discipline: Heat transfer Mass transfer
- Language: English
- Edited by: T. S. Zhao

Publication details
- History: 1960–present
- Publisher: Elsevier
- Frequency: Monthly
- Impact factor: 5.0 (2023)

Standard abbreviations
- ISO 4: Int. J. Heat Mass Transf.

Indexing
- ISSN: 0017-9310
- OCLC no.: 1753576

Links
- Journal homepage; Online access

International Journal of Heat and Mass Transfer is a peer-reviewed scientific journal in the field of heat transfer and mass transfer, published by Elsevier. The editor-in-chief is T. S. Zhao (Hong Kong University of Science and Technology).

== Abstracting and indexing ==
The journal is abstracted and indexed in:

- Chemical Abstracts
- Current Contents/Engineering, Computing & Technology
- Current Contents/Social & Behavioral Sciences
- Applied Mechanics Reviews
- Zentralblatt MATH
- Cambridge Scientific Abstracts
- Inspec
- PASCAL
- Scopus

According to the Journal Citation Reports, the journal has a 2020 impact factor of 5.584.
