= Margaret Lesley Bush-Brown =

American painter & etcher (1857–1944)

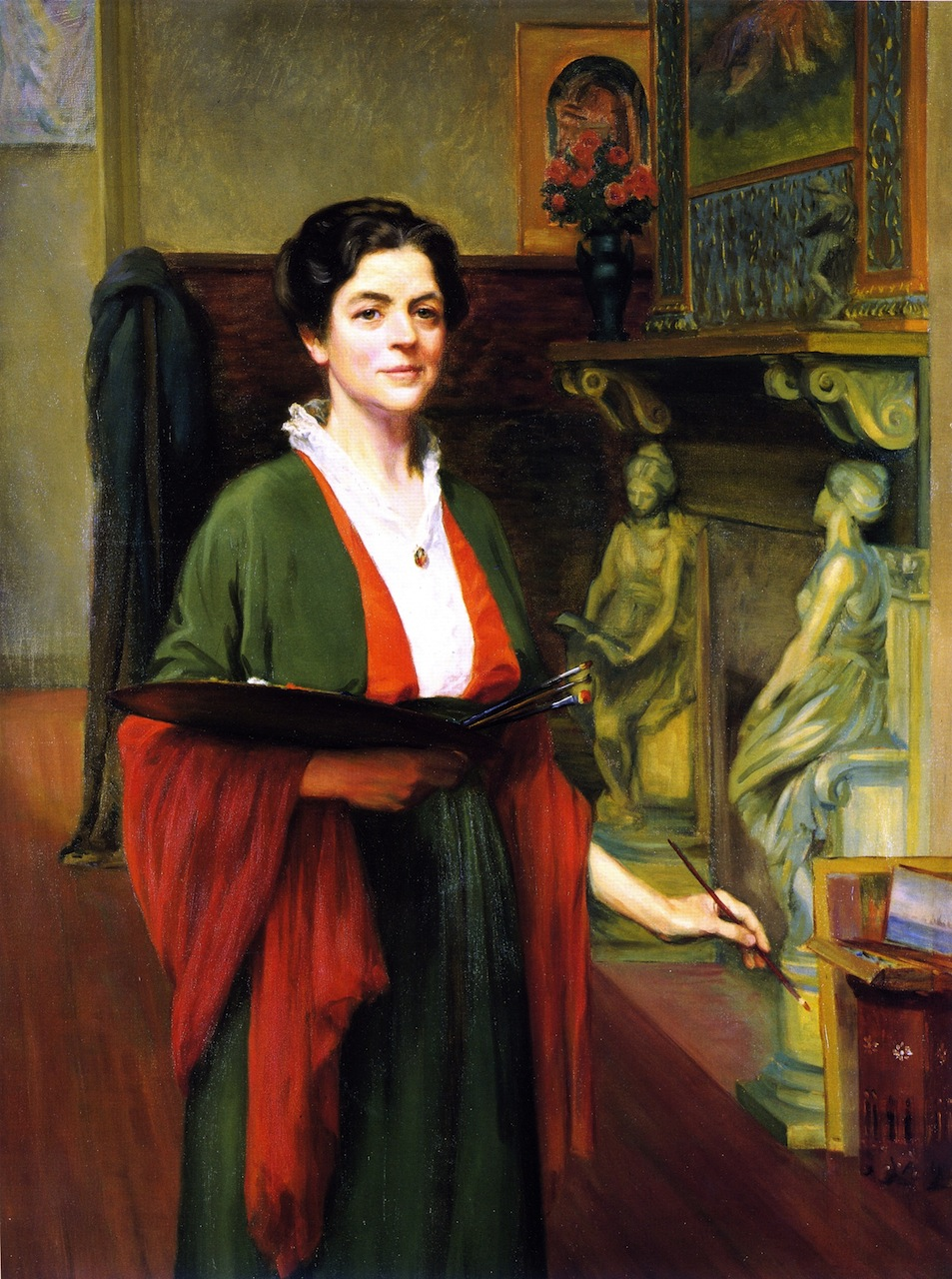
- Self-Portrait, 1914
- Born: Margaret White Lesley; May 19, 1857; Philadelphia, Pennsylvania
- Died: November 16, 1944 (aged 87)
- Known for: Painting
- Spouse: Henry Kirke Bush-Brown (m. 1886–1935) his death

Margaret White Lesley Bush-Brown (May 19, 1857 – November 16, 1944) was an American painter and etcher.

== Biography ==
Margaret White Lesley was a native of Philadelphia, the daughter of geologist Peter Lesley and social reformer Susan Inches (Lyman) Lesley; her first job was creating geological models for her father. Her first professor was Thomas Eakins, with whom she studied at the Pennsylvania Academy of the Fine Arts before moving to Paris, in 1880, for further instruction; in the intervening years she also took lessons at the Philadelphia School of Design for Women.

In Paris, she enrolled in the Académie Julian and took lessons with Tony Robert-Fleury, Gustave Boulanger, and Jules-Joseph Lefebvre, before returning to the United States in October 1883. She then learned to etch under the tutelage of Gabrielle de Veaux Clements, and in 1884 exhibited Study of a Girl's Head, likely her first print, at the New York Etching Club. At some point she also had lessons with Christian Schussele.

She soon began moving in a circle with numerous other women artists, including Elizabeth Boott, Cecilia Beaux, and Mary Franklin, often summering with them along the East Coast. In 1881, she toured France and Belgium with Ellen Day Hale, a distant cousin, and with Helen Mary Knowlton. In April 1886 she married the sculptor Henry Kirke Bush-Brown and moved to his home in Newburgh, New York. The couple later relocated to Washington, D.C., where Margaret worked as a portraitist and miniaturist. Her husband died in 1935, but she remained in Washington until 1941. In that year she moved to Pennsylvania, where she died three years later at the home of her son James in Ambler. The Bush-Browns had three surviving children, two sons, Harold and James, who became architects and a daughter, Lydia, who achieved some renown as an artist herself.

Portrait of Worcester Reed Warner (Warner Library, Tarrytown, NY)

In addition to exhibiting on her own, Margaret Bush-Brown would sometimes show work jointly with her husband and, later, with their daughter. In 1883 she exhibited at the Paris Salon. Bush-Brown exhibited her work at the Palace of Fine Arts and painted a mural Spring for the Pennsylvania State Building at the 1893 World's Columbian Exposition in Chicago, Illinois. She won a number of prizes for her work during her career, and she was the subject of a retrospective exhibition at the Corcoran Gallery of Art in 1911.

Her portrait of Ellen Day Hale is owned by the Smithsonian American Art Museum. A pair of portraits, of physician John Murray and Mary Boyles, are owned by the Norfolk and Norwich University Hospital. Her portrait of mechanical engineer and philanthropist Worcester Reed Warner is displayed in the Warner Library in Tarrytown, New York. A self-portrait, dated 1914 and currently in the collection of the Pennsylvania Academy of the Fine Arts, was included in the inaugural exhibition of the National Museum of Women in the Arts, American Women Artists 1830-1930, in 1987.

Bush-Brown's papers, together with those of other members of her family, are today held at Smith College.
