= Peter Lesley =

American geologist (1819–1903)

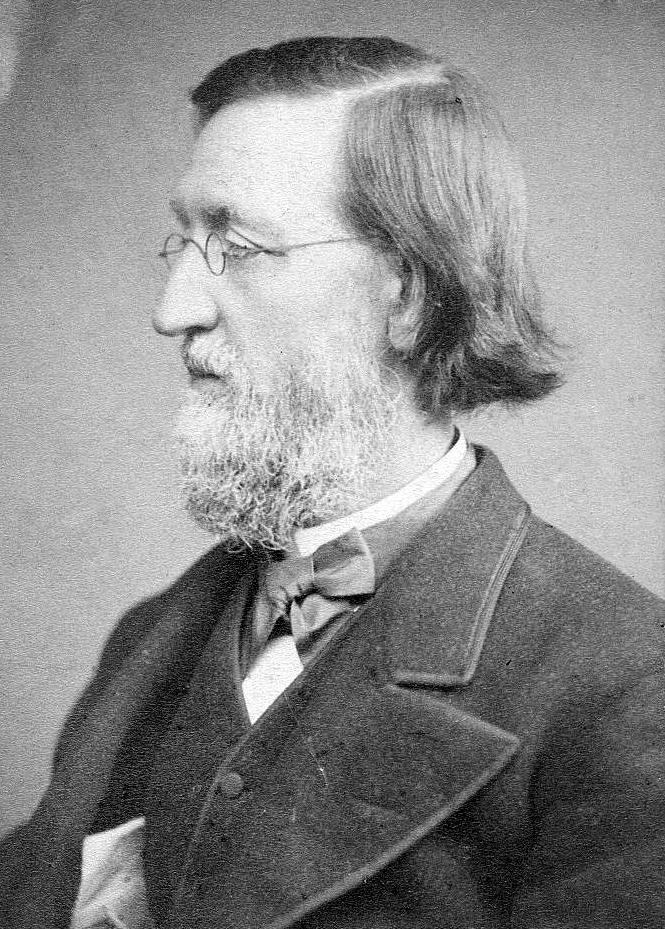
- Lesley in 1877
- Born: September 17, 1819; Philadelphia, Pennsylvania, U.S.
- Died: June 1, 1903 (aged 83); Milton, Massachusetts, U.S.
- Occupation: Geologist

Signature
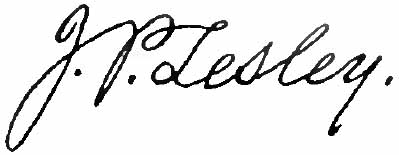

Peter Lesley (September 17, 1819 – June 1, 1903), later known as J. Peter Lesley, was an American geologist.

== Biography ==
Peter Lesley was born in Philadelphia, Pennsylvania on September 17, 1819. It is recorded by Sir Archibald Geikie that he was christened Peter after his father and grandfather, and at first wrote his name Peter Lesley, Jr., but, disliking that forename, he eventually transformed his signature by putting the J. of Junior at the beginning. He graduated from the University of Pennsylvania in 1838, where he was trained for the ministry. Subsequently, he spent three years assisting Henry D. Rogers in the first geological survey of Pennsylvania.

On the termination of the survey in 1841, he entered Princeton Theological Seminary while also assisting Professor Rogers in preparing the final report and map of Pennsylvania. He graduated from the seminary in 1844, and, in April of that year, he was licensed to preach by the presbytery of Philadelphia. A month later he left for Europe where he studied at the University of Halle, returning to the United States in 1845. He then worked for two years for the American Tract Society, and at the close of 1847 he joined Professor Rogers again in preparing geological maps and sections at Boston. He then accepted the pastorate of the Congregational church at Milton, Massachusetts. He remained there until 1851, when, his views having become unitarian, he abandoned the ministry, returned to Philadelphia, and entered into practice as a consulting geologist.

He made extensive and important researches in the coal, oil, and iron fields of the United States and Canada and became State geologist of Pennsylvania in 1874. From 1872 to 1878 he served as professor of geology at the University of Pennsylvania; after 1886 he was emeritus professor. He spent 1863 in Europe, examining the Bessemer ironworks in Sheffield for the Pennsylvania Railroad, and in 1867 he was one of ten commissioners sent by the United States Senate to the World's Fair in Paris.

Lesley was elected to the American Philosophical Society in 1856. He later served as the Society's secretary and librarian from 1858 until 1885, and during that time prepared a catalogue of its library in three volumes (1863, 1866, and 1878). He was also a member of various other scientific societies, and was one of the original members of the National Academy of Sciences. In 1884 he was president of the American Association for the Advancement of Science.

Lesley was a proponent of the high antiquity of humankind; "My own belief is but the reflection of the growing sentiment of the whole geological world [...] that our race has been upon the earth for hundreds of thousands of years."

== Family ==
His wife, Susan Inches Lesley (1823-1904), was the daughter of Judge Joseph Lyman, of Northampton, Massachusetts, and Anne Jean Lyman (née Robbins), daughter of Edward Robbins. She married Prof. Lesley in 1849, and devoted herself to the work of organized charities in Philadelphia. She also was an abolitionist, and worked with Frederick Douglass to reconnect slave families separated by sale. She published Memoirs of Mrs. Anne J. Lyman (Cambridge, 1876; 2d ed., entitled Recollections of My Mother, Boston, 1886). The couple's daughter was the painter Margaret Lesley Bush-Brown, whose first job was creating geological models for her father.

Peter Lesley died, aged 83, from a stroke at his home in Milton, Massachusetts on June 1, 1903.

== Works ==
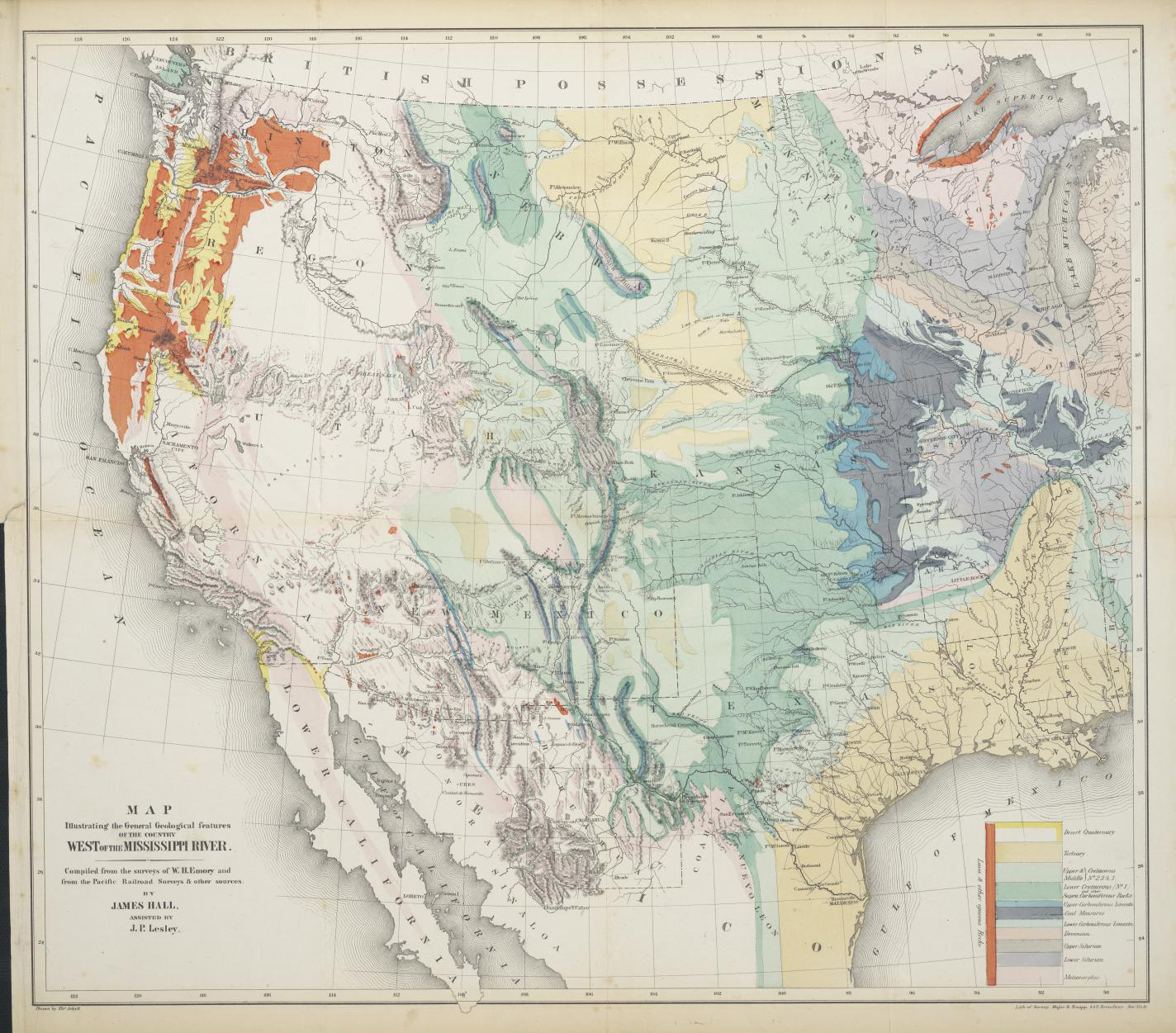
Lesley and James Hall's Map Illustrating the General Geological Features of the Country West of the Mississippi River, 1857

Besides many reports and numerous papers in scientific magazines, he published:

- Manual of coal and its topography: illustrated by original drawings, chiefly of facts in the geology of the Appalachian region of the United States of North America (1856)
- Guide to the iron works of the United States (1858)
- The iron manufacturer's Guide to the furnaces, forges and rolling mills of the United States (1859)
- Report on the Embreeville Iron Property, East Tennessee (1873)
- A map and profile of a line of levels along Slippery Rock Creek (1875)
- Historical Sketch of Geological Explorations in Pennsylvania (1876)
- Man's origin and destiny: sketched from the platform of the sciences, in a course of lectures delivered before the Lowell Institute, in Boston, in the winter of 1865-6 (1868, 2. ed. 1881)
