= Henry K. Bush-Brown =

American sculptor (1857–1935)

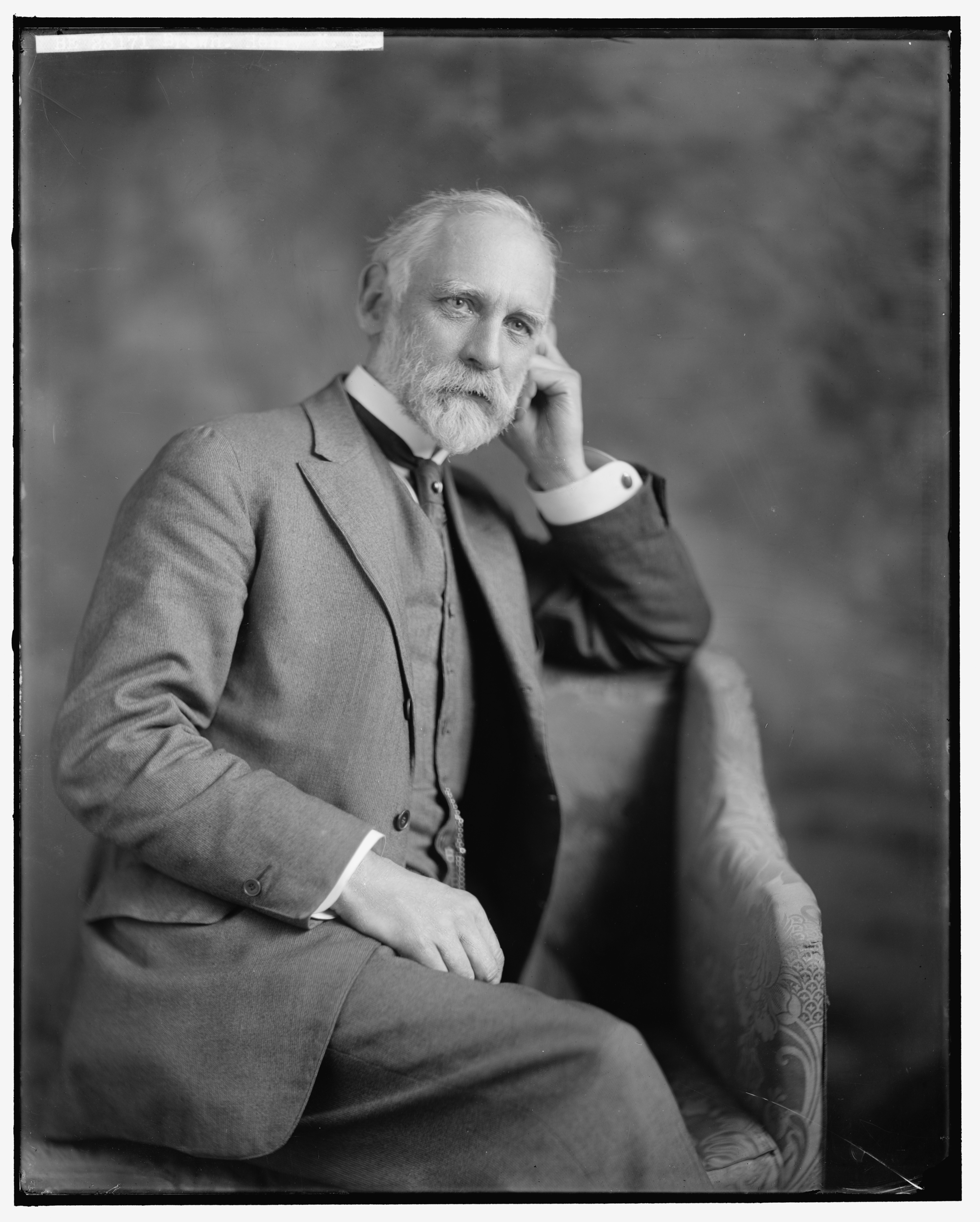
- Portrait of Bush-Brown, c. 1905–1935
- Born: Henry Kirke Bush-Brown; April 21, 1857; Ogdensburg, New York, U.S.
- Died: 1935 (aged 77–78); Washington, D.C., U.S.
- Resting place: Baldwin Memorial United Methodist Church Cemetery; Millersville, Maryland, U.S.
- Occupation: Sculptor
- Spouse: Margaret White Lesley
- Children: 3, including Lydia
- Relatives: Henry Kirke Brown (uncle)

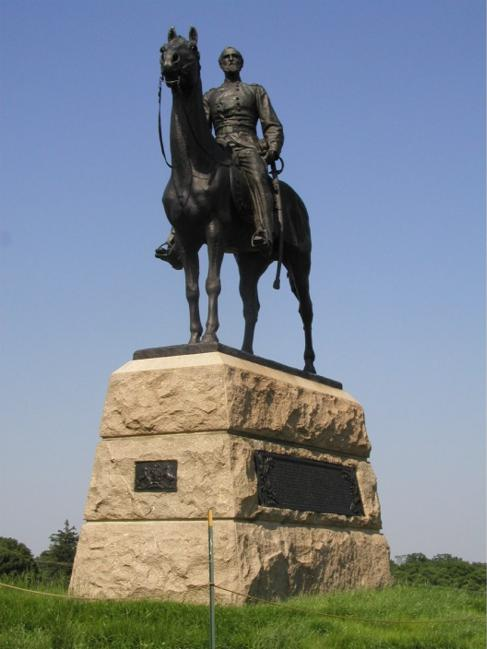
Bush-Brown's first equestrian statue was a monument to Union General George Meade on the Gettysburg Battlefield, located close to the point where Pickett's Charge was repulsed.

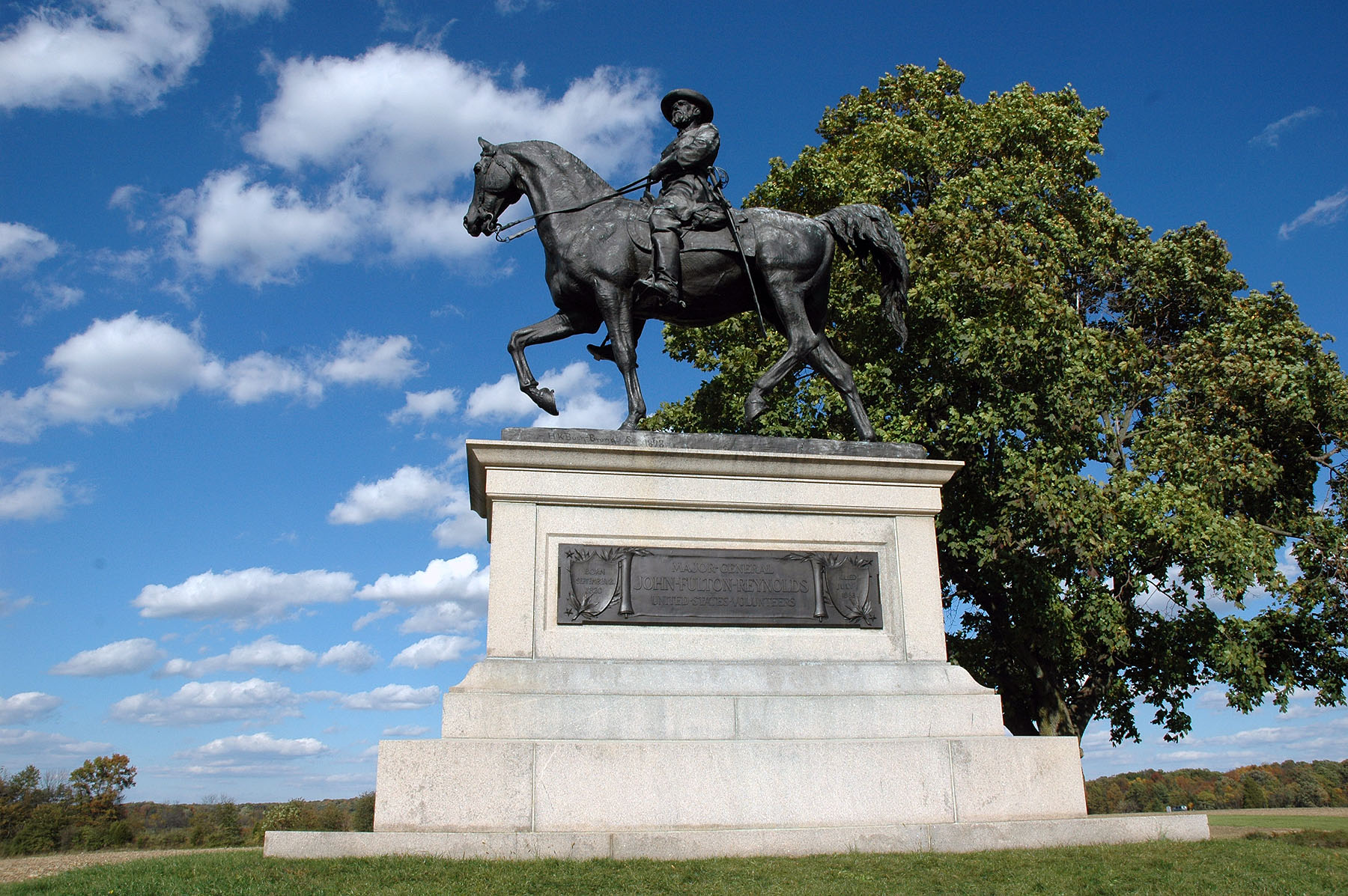
Monument to General John F. Reynolds on the Gettysburg Battlefield; the horse has two feet raised, presenting problems of balance and construction.

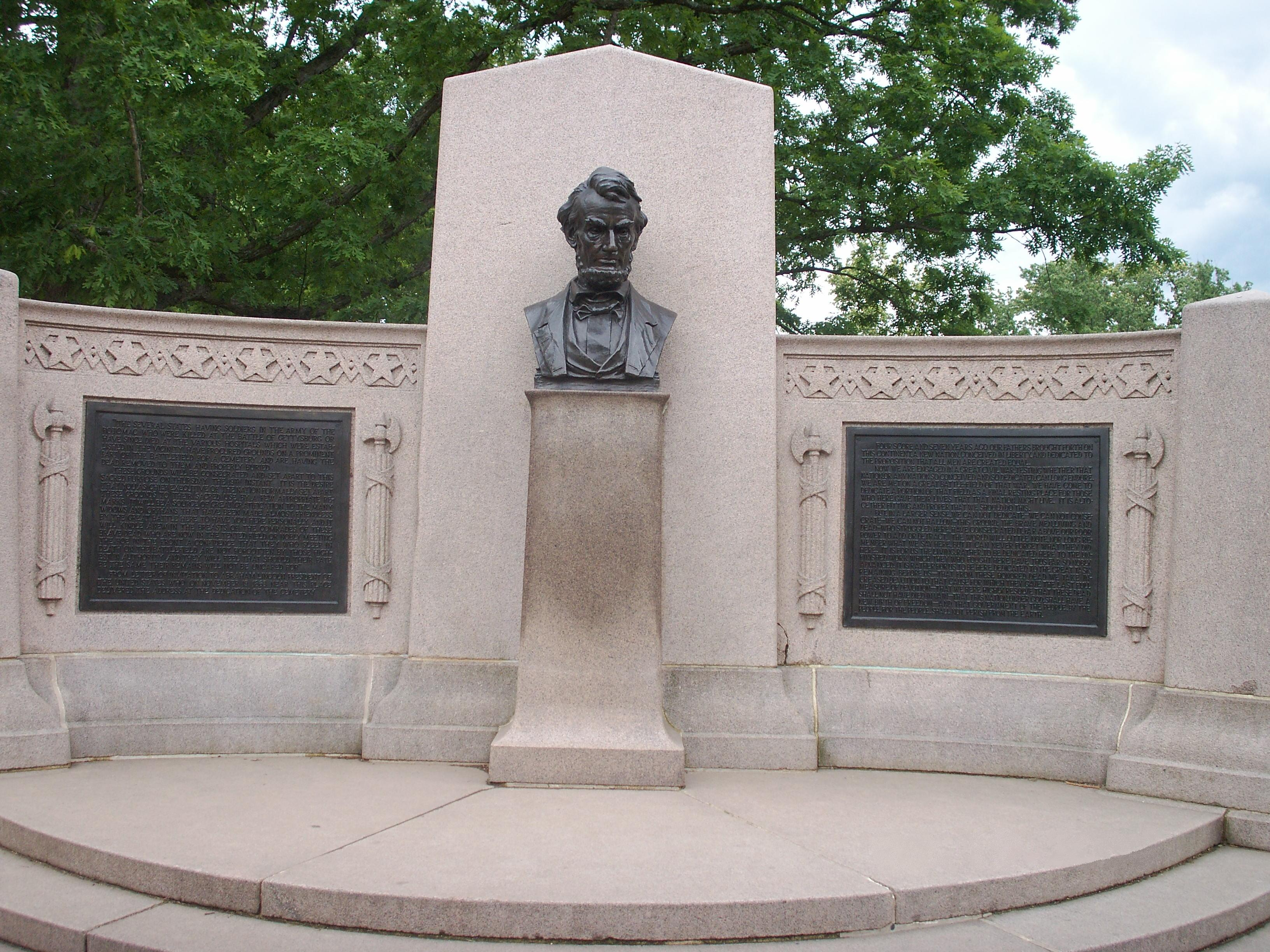
The Lincoln Address Memorial, designed by Louis Henrick, with bust of Abraham Lincoln by Henry Kirke Bush-Brown, erected at the Gettysburg Battlefield in 1912

Henry Kirke Bush-Brown (April 21, 1857 in Ogdensburg, New York –1935) was an American sculptor and the adopted nephew of sculptor Henry Kirke Brown. He was raised in Newburgh, New York and attended the National Academy of Design in New York City. He became known for historically accurate realist sculptures illustrating American history.

Bush-Brown married Margaret White Lesley, also a painter, with whom he had three surviving children; their daughter, Lydia, became a noted designer.

Henry K. Bush-Brown was the first president of the Arts Club of Washington.

== Works at Gettysburg battlefield ==
Bush-Brown produced three equestrian bronze sculptures at Gettysburg battlefield. The first equestrian statue ever produced by Bush-Brown was that of General George Meade, the victor at Gettysburg. Located on Hancock Avenue, it is near where "Meade watched his Union troops repulse the Confederate charge." This statue was created after two years of research, and portrays "Meade without a hat, as he appeared during the battle," in keeping with Bush-Brown's commitment to historical accuracy. Meade holds a pair of binoculars in his right hand and his hat in his left hand. A sword hangs from the left side of his saddle. The monument cost $37,500. The sculpture of Meade gazes across the battlefield toward the statue of his opponent, Robert E. Lee.

Following the production of Meade, Bush-Brown created a 9,000-pound monument of General John F. Reynolds (killed in action July 1, 1863), in which the horse has only two feet on the ground. This statue was dedicated in 1899 at a ceremony in which Bush-Brown, Reynolds' nephew, and Pennsylvania Governor William Stone were present. The sculpture is located approximately 1100 feet from the marker where Reynolds was killed.

Bush-Brown also produced an equestrian bronze of General John Sedgwick, the seniormost Union casualty of the American Civil War, who was killed later at the Battle of Spotsylvania Courthouse and who had participated in the Battle of Gettysburg. The statue of Sedgwick incorporates such details as the dents in the General's scabbard and the tiny stitching seen on the horse blanket.

In addition, Bush-Brown made a bust of Abraham Lincoln, dedicated in 1912 as part of the Lincoln Speech Memorial commemorating Lincoln's Gettysburg Address.

== Other notable works ==
Another of Bush-Brown's noted works was a figure of Commodore Isaac Hull, one of four American naval heroes produced by various artists for the 1899 triumphal Dewey Arch in New York City's Madison Square, commemorating the naval victory of Admiral George Dewey at the Battle of Manila Bay.

Bush-Brown created numerous sculptures for the exterior of New York City's Beaux Arts 1907 Surrogate's Courthouse.

In 1910 he created a bronze statue of Mary Jemison, "The White Woman of the Genesee", which marks her grave in New York's Letchworth State Park.

Bush-Brown also produced a relief of financier and civic planner Cyrus Clark (1911), who was instrumental in the planning and development of New York City's Riverside Drive and Riverside Park. Brown's relief of Clark is embedded in a natural rock outcropping near the 83rd Street entrance to Riverside Park.

== Authorship ==
Apart from his numerous sculptures related to American history, Bush-Brown was also the author of an unpublished biographical manuscript detailing the life and work of his uncle. One copy of the manuscript is with the Bush-Brown family papers at Smith College and another is held by the Library of Congress. (See also Sophia Smith Collection.)

== Death ==
Bush-Brown died in Washington, D.C., and was buried in Baldwin Memorial United Methodist Church Cemetery in Millersville, Maryland.

== Gallery ==
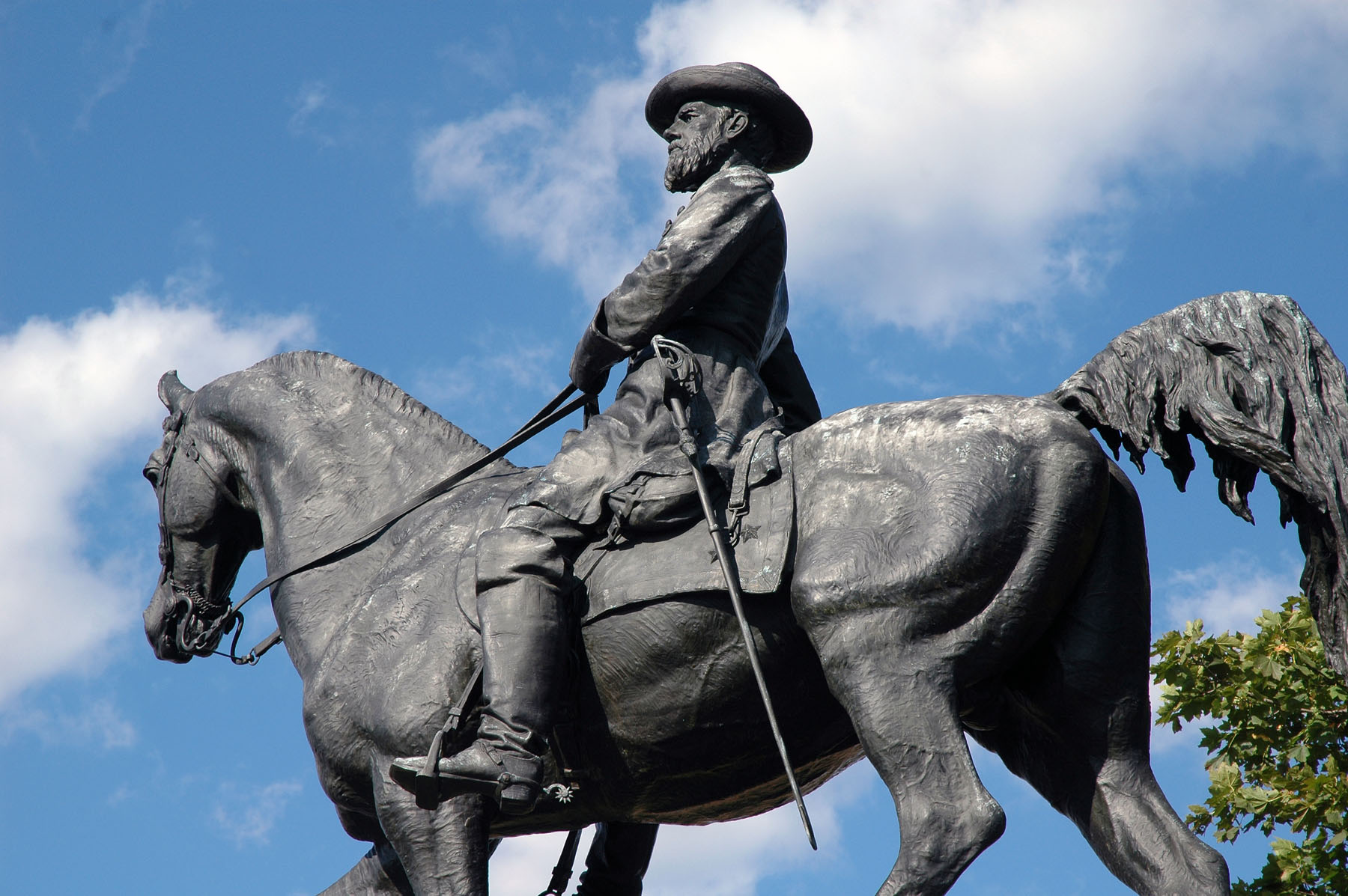
Detail of John F. Reynolds sculpture from Gettysburg Battlefield.

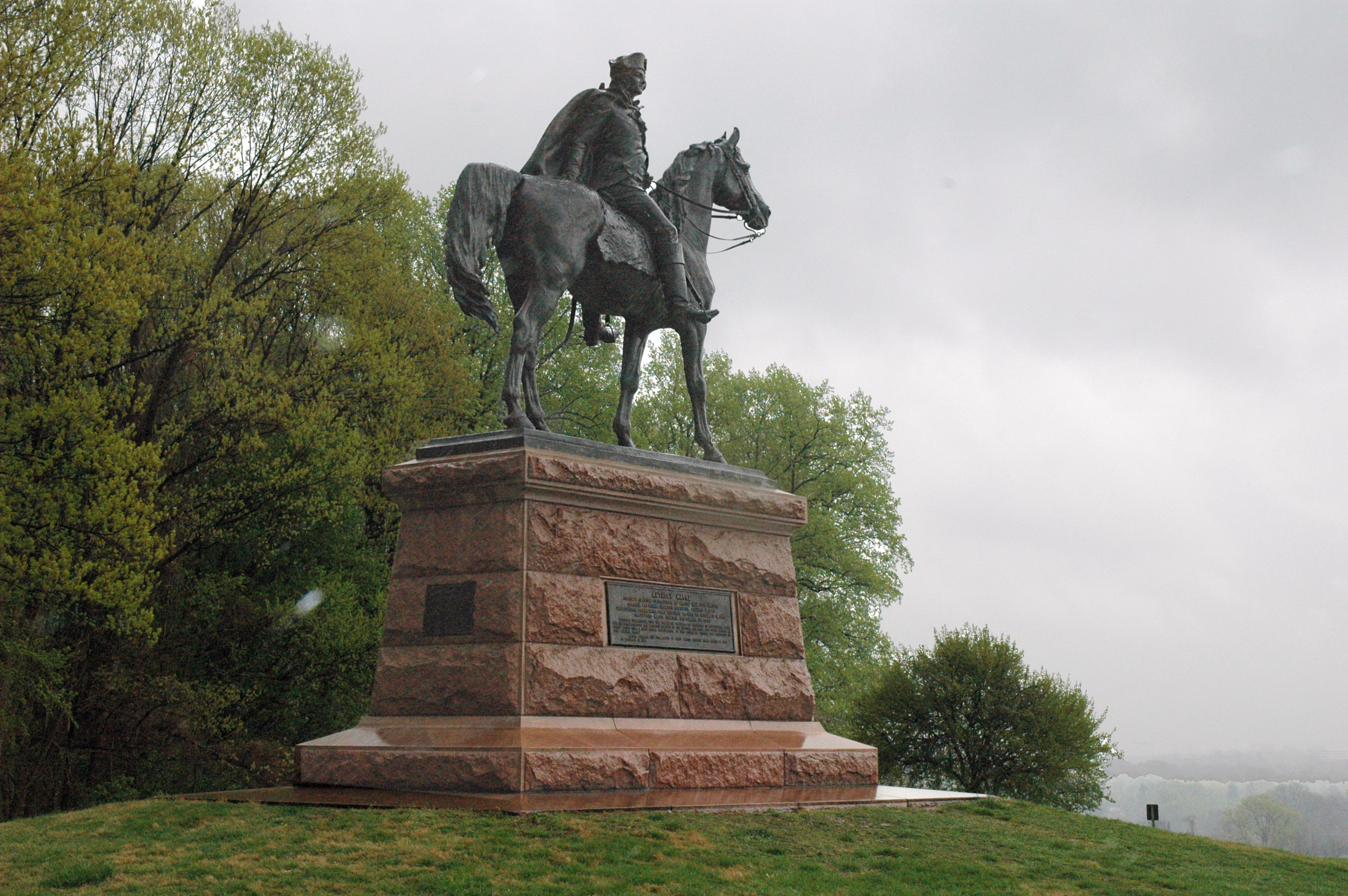
American Revolutionary War General Anthony Wayne sculpture at Valley Forge, Pennsylvania.

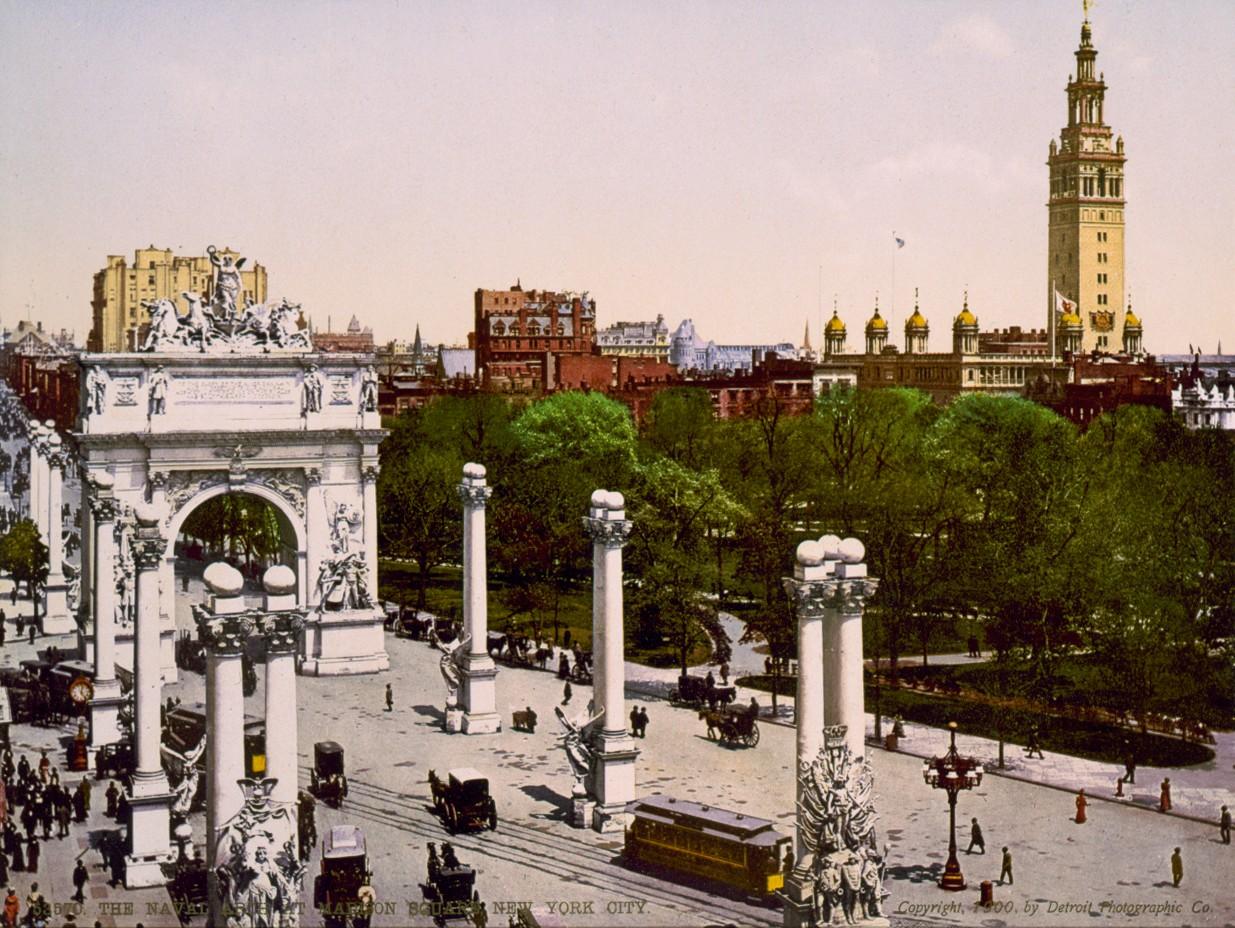
The Dewey Arch in New York City at Fifth Avenue and 24th street, 1900; Bush-Brown created the figure of Isaac Hull in the top row of four figures.

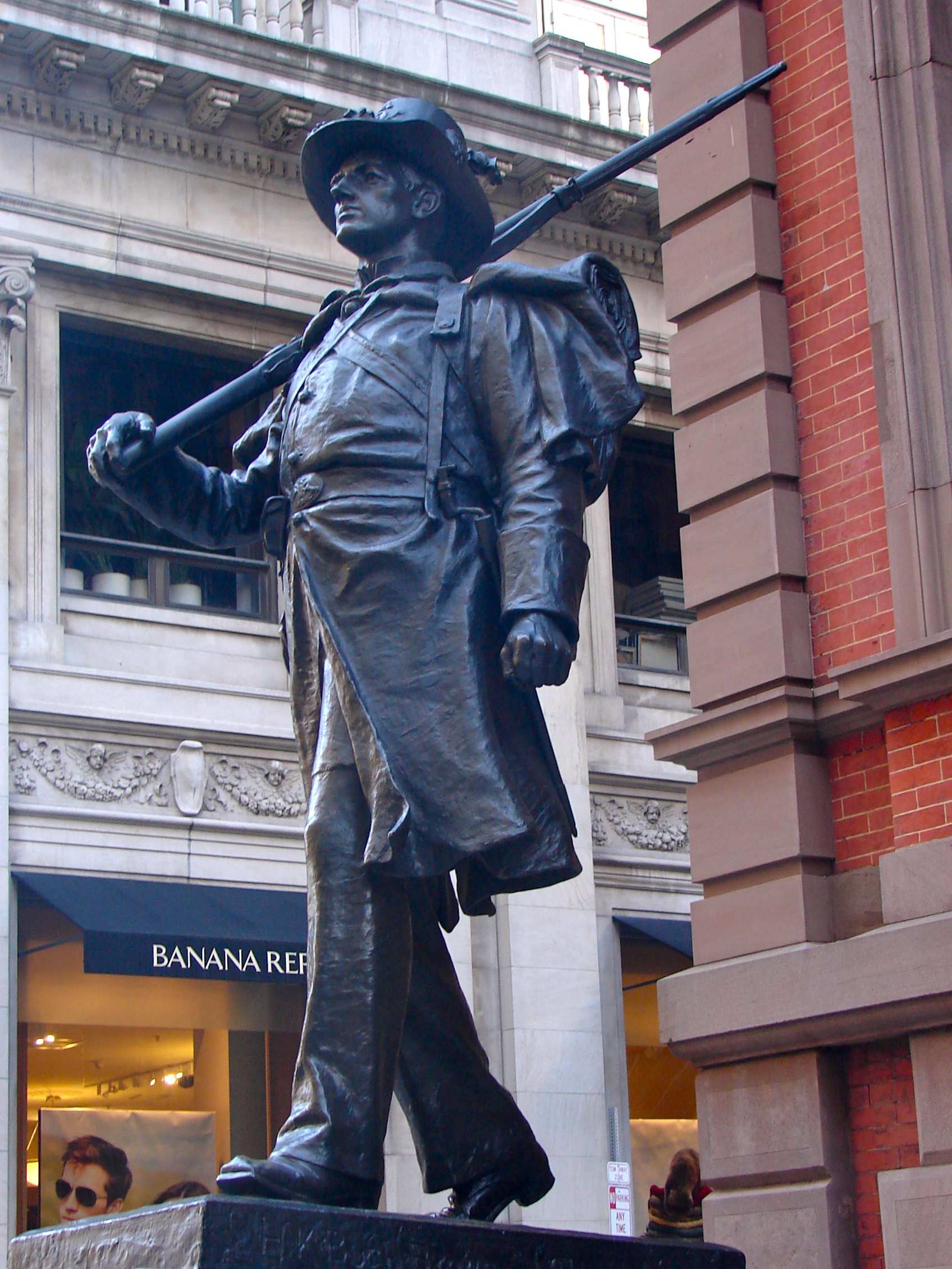
1st Regiment Infantry National Guard of Philadelphia
