= Warren Max Rohsenow =

American engineer (1921–2011)

- Born: 12 February 1921; Chicago, United States
- Died: 3 June 2011 (aged 90); Falmouth, Maine
- Education: Northwestern University
- Occupation: University Professor
- Awards: American Academy of Arts and Sciences (1956); Max Jakob Memorial Award (1970); US National Academy of Engineering (1975); ASME Medal (2001)
- Scientific career
- Fields: Mechanical Engineering
- Workplaces: Massachusetts Institute of Technology

Warren Max Rohsenow (12 February 1921 – 3 June 2011) was an American mechanical engineer. He was a professor at the Massachusetts Institute of Technology and the founder of Dynatech Corporation.

== Early life and education ==
Warren Max Rohsenow was born in Chicago on February 12, 1921. His parents were Fred and Selma Rohsenow. He grew up in Fort Worth, Texas and Wichita, Kansas.

In 1941, he completed his Bachelor of Science in mechanical engineering from Northwestern University, then in 1943, he earned a Master of Arts from Yale University. He received in D.Eng. from Yale in 1944. He served in the U.S. Navy, in a technical role, after completing his doctorate.

Rohsenow was known as an accomplished pianist, and he played jazz with various ensembles. He had a piano in his MIT office, which he would occasionally use in the hallway for departmental celebrations.

== Career ==
=== Academic career ===
He joined the faculty of the Massachusetts Institute of Technology in 1946, and joined in the Heat Measurements Laboratory. Rohsenow became director of lab in 1956, and it was renamed the Heat Transfer Laboratory. Rohsenow was highly recognized for his research in boiling heat transfer. Many of his graduate students went on to become professors.

Rohsenow wrote more than 100 journal papers and several hundred conference papers during his career.

Rohsenow's teaching led him to write one of the first textbooks on heat transfer in 1961, "Heat, Mass and Momentum Transfer", with H. Y. Choi. He also acted as the editor of three editions of the "Handbook of Heat Transfer" (1973, 1985, 1998).

He retired from his post at MIT in 1985.

=== Corporate career ===
In the late 1950s, he co-founded the Dynatech Corporation, a consulting and manufacturing company responsible for significant developments in the fields of cryomechanics.

== Awards and honours ==
Rohsenow received a number of awards, including the Max Jakob Memorial Award of ASME in 1970, and ASME Medal in 2001.

He was elected to the American Academy of Arts and Sciences in 1956. He was elected to the National Academy of Engineering in 1975 for “contributions to boiling and condensing liquid-heat transfer and the teaching of the concepts of heat and mass transfer.”

The Heat Transfer Lab, which Rohsenow had led for 28 years, was renamed the Rohsenow Kendall Heat and Mass Transfer Lab in 2010, following a major renovation funded by his student, Dr. Gail E. Kendall.
