= A. Louis London =

American mechanical engineer

Alexander Louis London (August 31, 1913 – March 19, 2008) was an American mechanical engineer and professor of mechanical engineering at Stanford University. London was elected to the National Academy of Engineering "for contributions to the theory and applications of compact heat exchangers, especially in the gas turbine field". The National Academy of Engineering called London "one of the world's best known experts in heat transfer equipment design, performance and analysis." The Stanford University called him "engineering expert on heat transfer". London received the R. Tom Sawyer Award by the Gas Turbine Division of the American Society of Mechanical Engineers, The James Harry Potter Gold Medal, and the Max Jakob Memorial Award.
