= Lesley Wright =

American mechanical engineer

Lesley Mae Wright is an American mechanical engineer, and an associate professor of mechanical engineering at Texas A&M University, where she is Jana and Quentin A. Baker ’78 Faculty Fellow. Her research concerns heat transfer, especially in the cooling of gas turbines.

== Education and career ==
Wright received a bachelor's degree in engineering, with a concentration in mechanical engineering, from Arkansas State University in 2000. She went to Texas A&M University for graduate study in mechanical engineering, receiving a master's degree in 2002 and completing her Ph.D. in 2006. Her dissertation, Experimental investigation of turbine blade platform film cooling and rotational effect on trailing edge internal cooling, was supervised by Je-Chin Han.

She became an assistant professor in the Department of Aerospace and Mechanical Engineering at the University of Arizona, the first female professor in the department. Next, she became a faculty member of the mechanical engineering department at Baylor University for ten years, before returning to Texas A&M as a faculty member.

== Recognition ==
Wright was the 2012 recipient of the Abe M. Zarem Faculty Award in Aeronautics of the AIAA, and the 2015 recipient of the Ralph R. Teetor Educational Award of SAE International, given for her work with Baylor University students in the Baja SAE off-road vehicle competitions.

She was named as an ASME Fellow in 2021.
