= Yogesh Jaluria =

Thermal sciences engineer

Professor Yogesh Jaluria is Board of Governors Professor and Distinguished Professor at Rutgers, the State University of New Jersey, in the Department of Mechanical and Aerospace Engineering. He is a specialist in thermal sciences and engineering.

== Biography ==
Jaluria was born in India, where he received his B.S. degree in mechanical engineering in 1970 from the Indian Institute of Technology, Delhi, standing first in his graduating class. He received his M.S. and Ph.D. degrees from Cornell University in 1972 and 1974, respectively.

He was a member of the research staff at Bell Labs, Princeton, from 1974 to 1976. He then returned to India to take an academic position at the Indian Institute of Technology, Kanpur, India (1976–80), before returning to the US, and joining Rutgers University. At Rutgers, Professor Jaluria served as chairman of his department from 2005 to 2011, and as Interim Dean of Engineering during 2008–2009. He was made a distinguished professor in 1991 and was appointed as Board of Governors Professor in 2001.

== Professional work ==
Jaluria is known for his work on natural convection, or buoyancy-driven flows. He wrote the first book on this topic and was a co-author of a later extensive treatise on the subject. Both of these books were translated into Russian, with extensive circulation in Eastern Europe. He has worked in the areas of computational fluid dynamics (CFD) and heat transfer, materials processing, such as optical fiber drawing, chemical vapor deposition and polymer extrusion, optimization of thermal systems, cooling of electronic systems, solar energy, and building fires. His most significant specific work includes the determination of feasible and optimal conditions in thermal processing, innovative methods for cooling electronic systems, growth and spread of building fires, basic understanding of transition to turbulence and effects of stratification and conjugate transport, multiscale modeling and quantification of mixing processes in extrusion. He has contributed over 500 articles, including over 210 in peer-reviewed archival journal articles, authored or co-authored 9 books, and edited or co-edited 10 books. All these books have had a major impact on the field due to innovative and pioneering approaches in research, engineering and education presented by them.

== Honors ==
Jaluria has received the Max Jakob Memorial Award, the highest honor in this field, from the American Institute of Chemical Engineers (AIChE) and the American Society of Mechanical Engineers (ASME), the society-wide Robert Henry Thurston Lecture Award from the ASME in 2003,, as well as the Freeman Scholar Award, Worcester Reed Warner Medal and the Heat Transfer Memorial Award from ASME; the Society made him an honorary member in 2012. He received the Donald Q. Kern Award from the AIChE, and the Luikov Medal from the International Center for Heat and Mass Transfer. He gave the ASME Richard Henry Thurston Award Lecture "Buoyancy-Induced Flows in Nature and Technology" in 2003. He is also a Fellow of the American Physical Society and of the American Association for the Advancement of Science.

He received the Distinguished Alumni Award from IIT, Delhi, India, in 1994, and the Daniel Gorenstein Memorial Award from Rutgers in 2010.

He was the Editor of ASME Journal of Heat Transfer from 2005 to 2010. During that time, he was instrumental in founding a new archival ASME journal, Journal of Thermal Science and Engineering Applications. He is presently the President of the American Society of Thermal and Fluids Engineers, an international non-profit organization focused on research and engineering in these and related fields, with particular emphasis on industry, international collaboration and emerging young researchers.

== Personal life ==
Professor Jaluria and his wife, Anuradha, are long time residents of New Jersey. They currently reside in Monroe Township, Middlesex County, New Jersey, having previously lived in East Brunswick, New Jersey. They have three children, Pratik, Aseem and Ankur and two daughter-in-laws, Leslie and Karishma. They also have five grandsons, Vyan, Nalin, Zev, Jai and Jaanav.
