= Shiro Nukiyama =

Shiro Nukiyama (March 15, 1896 – July 2, 1983) was a Japanese mechanical engineer and discoverer of the Nukiyama Curve. His older brother was the electrical engineer Heiichi Nukiyama.

== Biography ==
Born in Tokyo, he entered the Department of Mechanical Engineering at Tokyo Imperial University (now the University of Tokyo). After graduating in 1920, he became involved in research into boiling in boilers and other equipment. In 1926, he became a professor at Tohoku Imperial University (now Tohoku University) where he taught.

He later earned a doctorate in engineering and became a professor emeritus at the same university in 1959. He also served as chairman of the Heat Transfer Society of Japan in 1963 and later served as an advisor to Toyota Motor Corporation and Takasago Thermal Engineering Co., Ltd., receiving many awards.

== Family ==
His father was a former Kaga feudal lord and patent attorney. His eldest brother, Heiichi Nukiyama, was a professor at Tohoku Imperial University, and his third brother, Daizo Nukiyama, was a professor at Tokyo Imperial University. His wife was Heiichi's wife's younger sister and graduated from Japan Women's University. His son, Shiro, later married Eiko Nukiyama, who served as a member of the House of Councillors in the Diet of Japan.

== Awards and honors ==
- Max Jacob Prize - awarded in 1968. Known as the " Nobel Prize of thermal engineering", Shiro was the first Japanese man to receive this award.
- Order of the Sacred Treasure, Second Class - Awarded in 1969.
