= Applied Mechanics Reviews =

Scientific journal

- Discipline: Mechanical engineering
- Language: English
- Edited by: Yonggang Huang

Publication details
- History: 1948–present
- Publisher: The American Society of Mechanical Engineers (United States)
- Frequency: Bimonthly
- Impact factor: 19.1 (2025)

Standard abbreviations
- ISO 4: Appl. Mech. Rev.

Indexing
- CODEN: AMREAD
- ISSN: 0003-6900 (print); 2379-0407 (web)
- LCCN: 50001469
- OCLC no.: 1064296

Links
- Journal homepage; Online archive

Applied Mechanics Reviews is a bimonthly peer-reviewed scientific journal established in 1948 by The American Society of Mechanical Engineers. The editor-in-chief is Yonggang Huang.

== Abstracting and indexing ==
The journal is abstracted and indexed in Science Citation Index, Current Contents/Engineering, Computing & Technology, Chemical Abstracts Service, and Scopus. According to the Journal Citation Reports, the journal had a 2020 impact factor of 7.281, released in 2021 (the year Yonggang Huang was interviewed for its Editor-in-Chief position). Its 2025 impact factor reached 19.1, released in 2026.
