= Engineer's Ring =

Ring worn by members of the United States Order of the Engineer

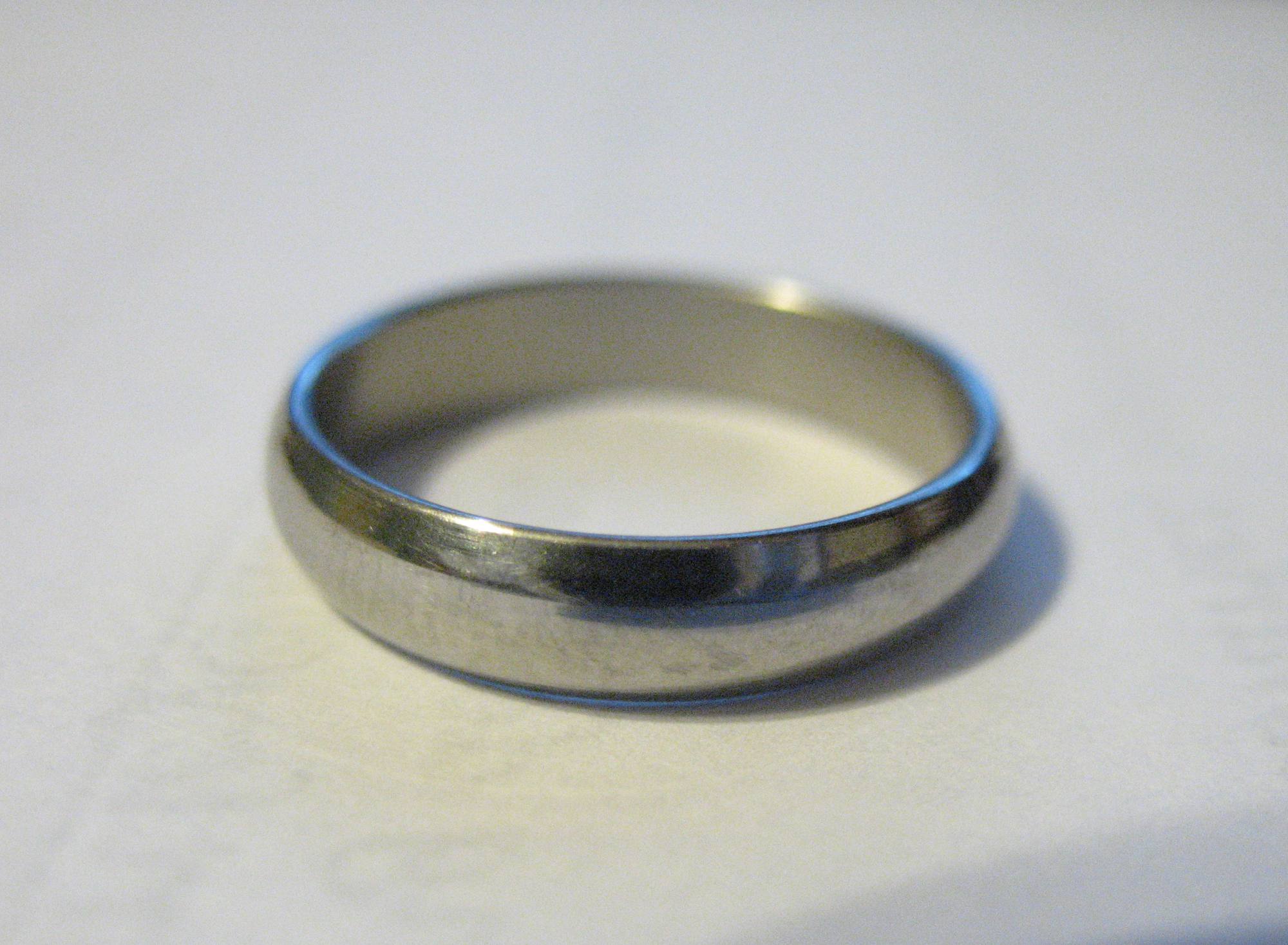
An example of the stainless steel Engineer's Ring issued by the Order of the Engineer

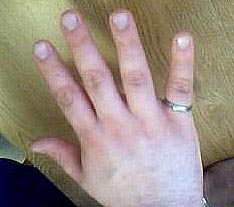
The ring is worn on the little finger of the dominant hand.

The Engineer's Ring is a ring worn by members of the Order of the Engineer, an American fellowship of engineers who must be a certified Professional Engineer or graduated from an accredited engineering program (or be within one academic year of graduation to participate). The ring is usually a stainless steel band worn on the pinky finger of the dominant hand. This is so that it makes contact with all work done by the engineer. Rings used to be cast in iron in the most unattractive and simple form to show the nature of work. The ring symbolizes the oath taken by the wearer, and symbolizes the unity of the profession in its goal of benefitting mankind. The stainless steel from which the ring is made depicts the profession's strength.

Starting in 1970, it was inspired by the Iron Ring, which is part of the original Canadian Ritual of the Calling of an Engineer ceremony first attended in 1922. Canadian engineers about to graduate are invited to attend the ring ceremony by the Corporation of the Seven Wardens in order to take the oath known as the Obligation of the Engineer. Only those who have met the standards of professional engineering training or experience can accept the Obligation, which is voluntarily received for life.

== The Obligation of the Engineer ==
The required oath, taken immediately before accepting the Engineer's Ring, is known as "The Obligation of the Engineer" and is as follows:

I am an Engineer.

In my profession I take deep pride. To it I owe solemn obligations.

As an engineer, I, (full name), pledge to practice Integrity and Fair Dealing, Tolerance, and Respect, and to uphold devotion to the standards and dignity of my profession, conscious always that my skill carries with it the obligation to serve humanity by making best use of the Earth's precious wealth.

As an engineer, I shall participate in none but honest enterprises. When needed, my skill and knowledge shall be given without reservation for the public good.

In the performance of duty, and in fidelity to my profession, I shall give the utmost.

== See also ==
- Engineering ethics
- Hippocratic Oath
- Institute of Electrical and Electronics Engineers
- Iron Ring
- List of engineering awards
- National Society of Professional Engineers
- Ritual of the Calling of an Engineer
