= Pinky ring =

Jewellery worn on the little finger

Professional poker player "California" Abe's pinky ring, made of platinum and diamonds, which he wears when playing cards.

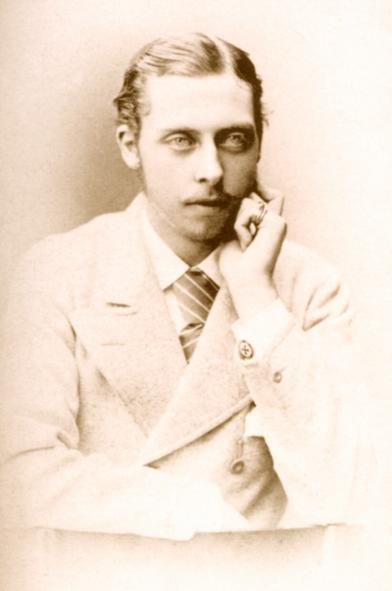
Prince Leopold, son of Queen Victoria, showing his left hand pinky rings worn in a typical stacked fashion, circa 1878.

A pinky ring is any ring worn on the pinky, or little finger, of either hand. A pinky ring may have special significance conferred by the wearer's office or professional association, but may also may be worn purely for fashion. Signet rings, which hold their own meaning, are often worn on the pinky.

== Professional rings ==
A variety of pinky rings are awarded to graduating engineering students in North America, generally intended to serve as a reminder of the significance and impact of their chosen profession. In Canada, these include the Iron Ring, made of either crudely worked iron or stainless steel and worn on the dominant hand, presented to engineering students during the Ritual of the Calling of an Engineer, and the silver, but otherwise similar, Earth Ring associated with the geologists and geophysicists of the Association of Professional Engineers and Geoscientists of Alberta. In the United States, the Engineer's Ring, awarded by the Order of the Engineer, is similar to the Canadian Iron Ring.

In Canada, students who graduate in good standing from accredited forestry programs traditionally receive a silver ring from the Canadian Institute of Forestry."Silver Ring Program". Canadian Institute of Forestry.

Human ecology and home economics graduates also receive a pinky ring symbolizing their profession. The Human Ecology Ring was first instigated by a group of young graduates at Macdonald College, Quebec, in 1968.

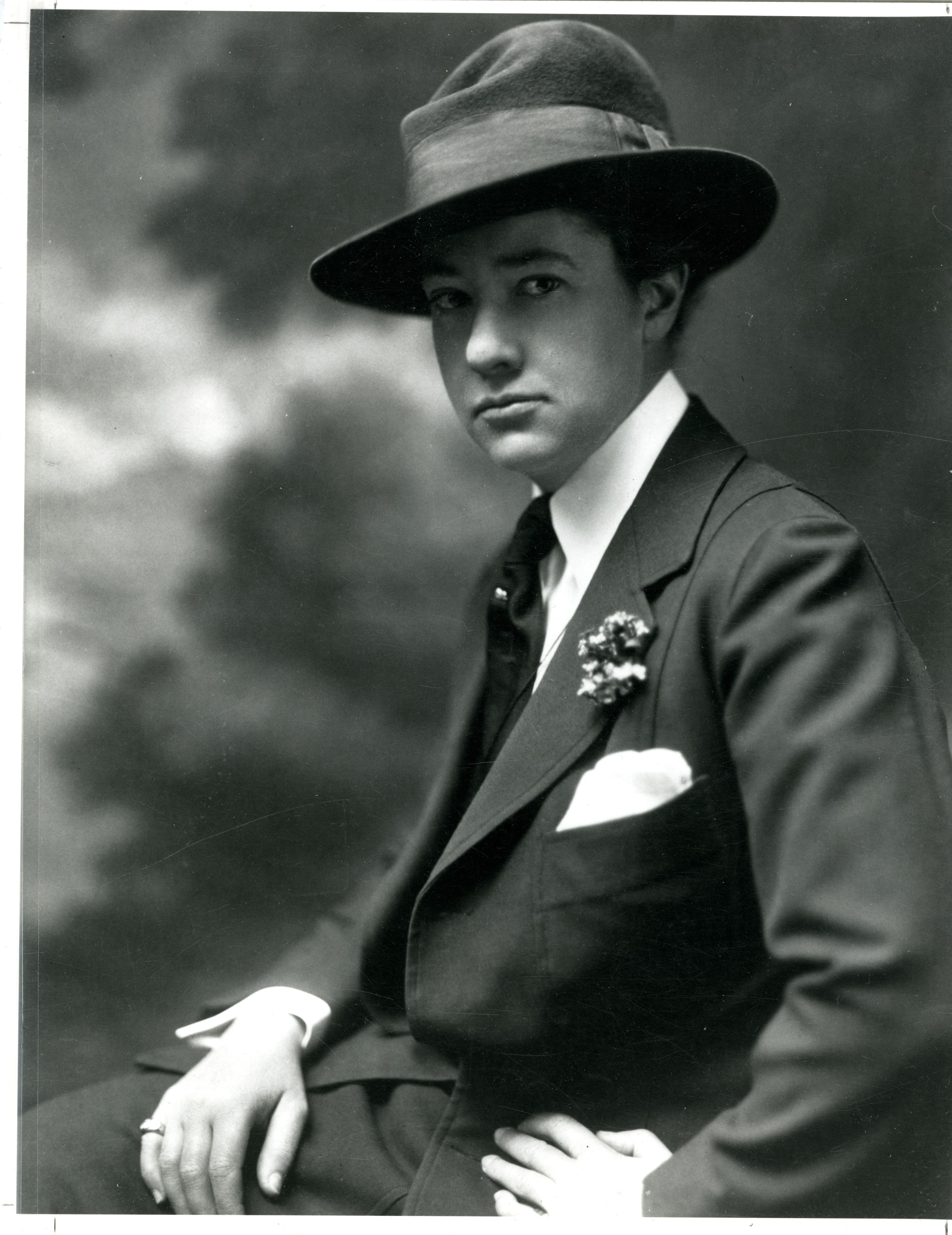
American farmer Caroline Foster wearing a pinky ring in 1917, possibly indicating disinterest in marriage.

== Indications of affiliation or conveying messages ==
At times, pinky rings have been worn with the intent to convey a message or indicate affiliation. During the Victorian era, both single men and women uninterested in pursuing marriage could wear a ring on the little finger of their left hand.

Especially in the United States, pinky rings also developed an association with criminal activity. Grifters were thought to wear such rings, sometimes to provide their associates with a source of funding for their funeral expenses in case of their death, as were made men in the American Mafia. Movies such as Little Caesar and The Godfather contributed to the association of this style of jewellery with organized crime.

== Fashion ==
The more modern use of the pinky ring has weakened its traditional historic symbolism. In the early 20th century, these rings were popular in Parisian fashion, especially among the youth. In the United States, such rings have become a "fundamental of American style", in some way due to its symbolic past.

== Signet and wedding rings ==
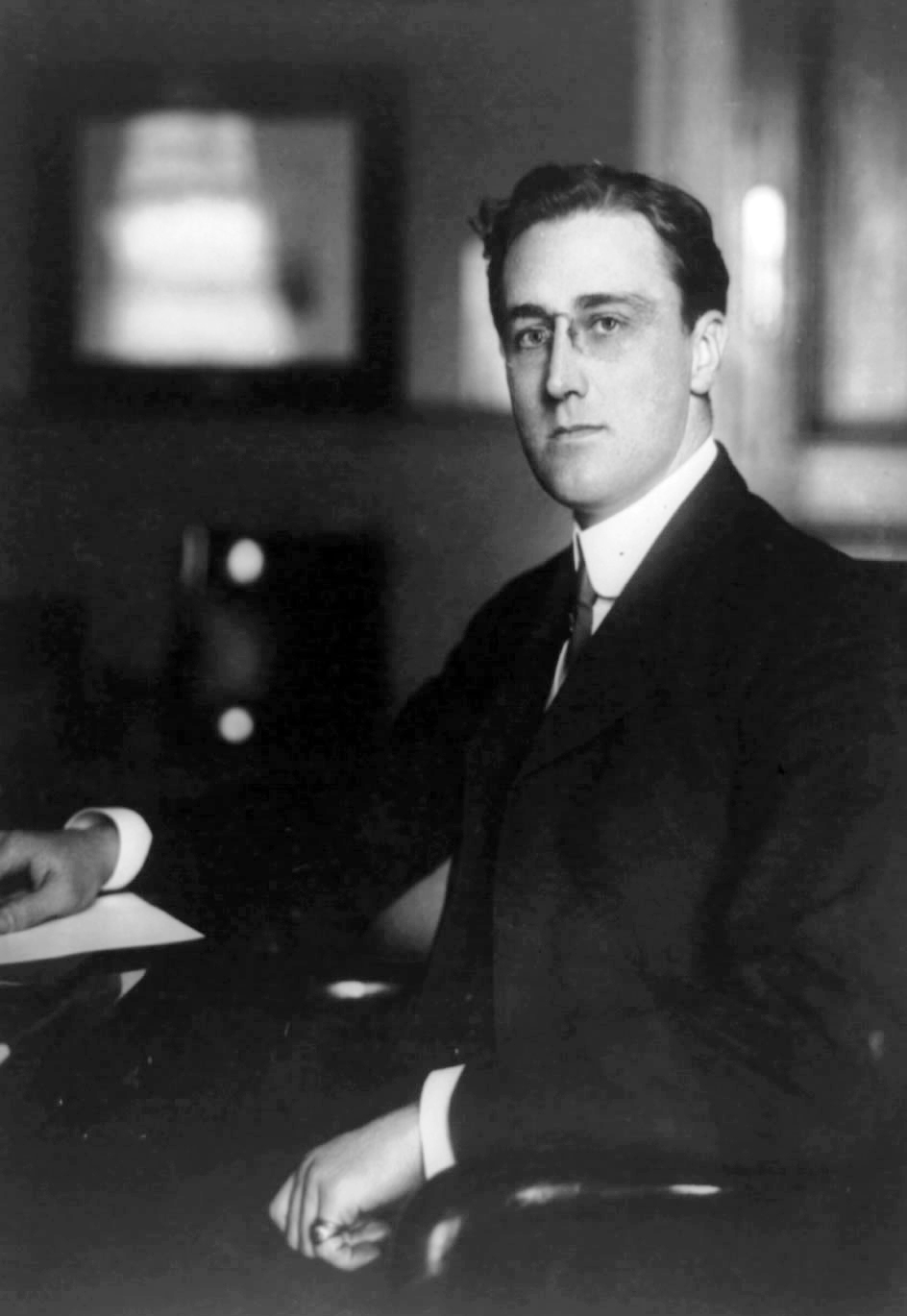
Franklin D. Roosevelt as Assistant Secretary of the Navy, 1913. Note, since he is recently married, he has his wedding band stacked beneath his father's Roosevelt Family signet ring. He would wear this stacked British-style configuration until the end of his life.

Pliny the Elder noted, according to the 1938 Loeb Classical Library translation by Harris Rackham, "Some people put all their rings on their little finger only, while others wear only one ring even on that finger, and use it to seal up their signet ring, which is kept stored away as a rarity not deserving the insult of common use, and is brought out from its cabinet as from a sanctuary; thus even wearing a single ring on the little finger may advertise the possession of a costlier piece of apparatus put away in store."

Some British men wear a signet ring on the little finger of the left hand, which is considered to be the correct place for it.

In common with many American families, in homage to the British tradition, President Franklin D. Roosevelt wore a signet ring handed down to him by his father James, and which was inherited by FDR's son James Roosevelt. All three generations wore the signet on top of their wedding bands, on their left pinkies. FDR's pinky signet was noted and admired by Sir Winston Churchill (who wore his own gold signet on a different finger).

Wedding bands (always a gift from wife to husband) were usually worn by Western men in the Victorian age on the left hand pinky finger, although few British men wore wedding rings until World War II. Because of masculine limitations, men were encouraged to wear a second ring if they desired, but it was to be worn on top of the wedding band so as to keep both rings confined to one finger. It appears the custom for men to wear their two rings on the left pinky was purely British and German; in America, men either followed the British tradition or wore no ring at all until much later.

== Use in the British Royal Family ==
The use of the left-hand pinky finger as the wedding ring and royal signet or initial ring of the British royal family is an ironclad tradition dating back to the sons of Queen Victoria, who favored pinky rings in imitation of their mother as well as following German custom. Queen Victoria's son Prince Leopold wore many rings on his left pinky, as did all of the sons of King George V. King Edward VII did not assign any special significance to his left pinky as later generations did, and his son George V wore no rings at all. The best example of such a ring was the one worn by King George VI. Prince Philip, Duke of Edinburgh, consort to Queen Elizabeth II, wore his father's signet ring until sometime in the 1970s, when he ceased to wear any signet.

King Charles III wears the official signet of the Prince of Wales. The ring is nearly 175 years old and was last worn by Edward VIII when he was Prince of Wales. King Charles III, as well as the other men in the family, wear their signets on top of their wedding bands.
