= Engineer =

Practitioner of engineering

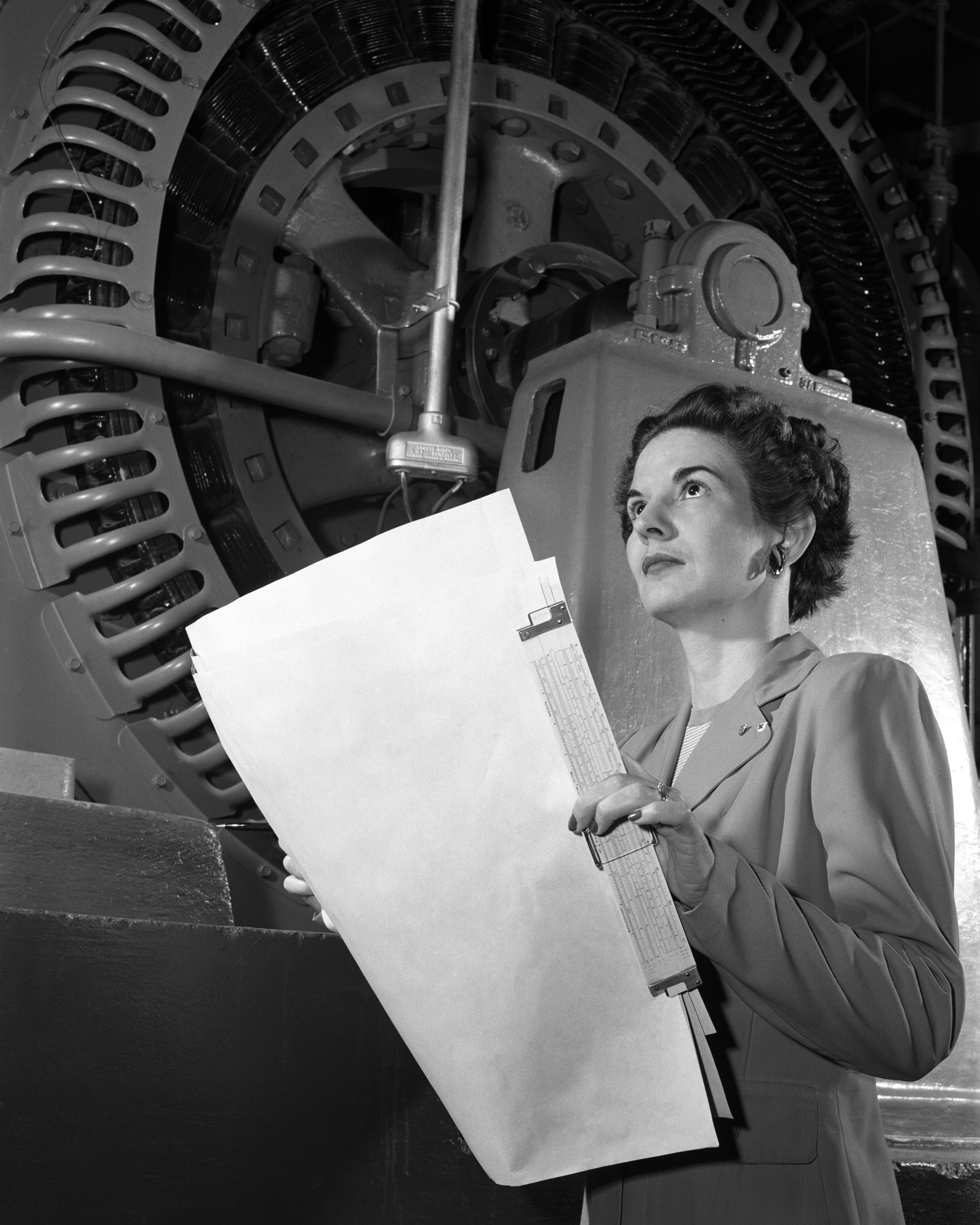
- Kitty Joyner, electrical engineer, analyzing the operation of a wind tunnel turbine at Langley in 1952

Occupation
- Names: Engineer
- Occupation type: Profession
- Activity sectors: Applied science

Description
- Competencies: Mathematics, science, design, analysis, critical thinking, engineering ethics, project management, engineering economics, creativity, problem solving, (See also: Glossary of engineering)
- Education required: Engineering education
- Fields of employment: Research and development, industry, business
- Related jobs: Scientist, architect, project manager, inventor, astronaut

An engineer is a practitioner of engineering. The word engineer is derived from the Latin words ingeniare ("to contrive, devise") and ingenium ("cleverness"). Ir is an honorific of an engineer in countries like Belgium, the Netherlands, and Indonesia (from Latin: ingeniator). The foundational qualifications of a licensed professional engineer typically include a four-year bachelor's degree in an engineering discipline, or in some jurisdictions, a master's degree in an engineering discipline plus four to six years of peer-reviewed professional practice (culminating in a project report or thesis) and passage of engineering board examinations.

The work of engineers forms the link between scientific discoveries and their subsequent applications to human and business needs and quality of life.

== Definition ==
In 1961, the Conference of Engineering Societies of Western Europe and the United States of America defined "professional engineer" as follows:

A professional engineer is competent by virtue of his/her fundamental education and training to apply the scientific method and outlook to the analysis and solution of engineering problems. He/she is able to assume personal responsibility for the development and application of engineering science and knowledge, notably in research, design, construction, manufacturing, superintending, managing, and in the education of the engineer. His/her work is predominantly intellectual and varied and not of a routine mental or physical character. It requires the exercise of original thought and judgment and the ability to supervise the technical and administrative work of others. His/her education will have been such as to make him/her capable of closely and continuously following progress in his/her branch of engineering science by consulting newly published works on a worldwide basis, assimilating such information, and applying it independently. He/she is thus placed in a position to make contributions to the development of engineering science or its applications. His/her education and training will have been such that he/she will have acquired a broad and general appreciation of the engineering sciences as well as thorough insight into the special features of his/her own branch. In due time he/she will be able to give authoritative technical advice and assume responsibility for the direction of important tasks in his/her branch.

== Roles and expertise ==
=== Design ===
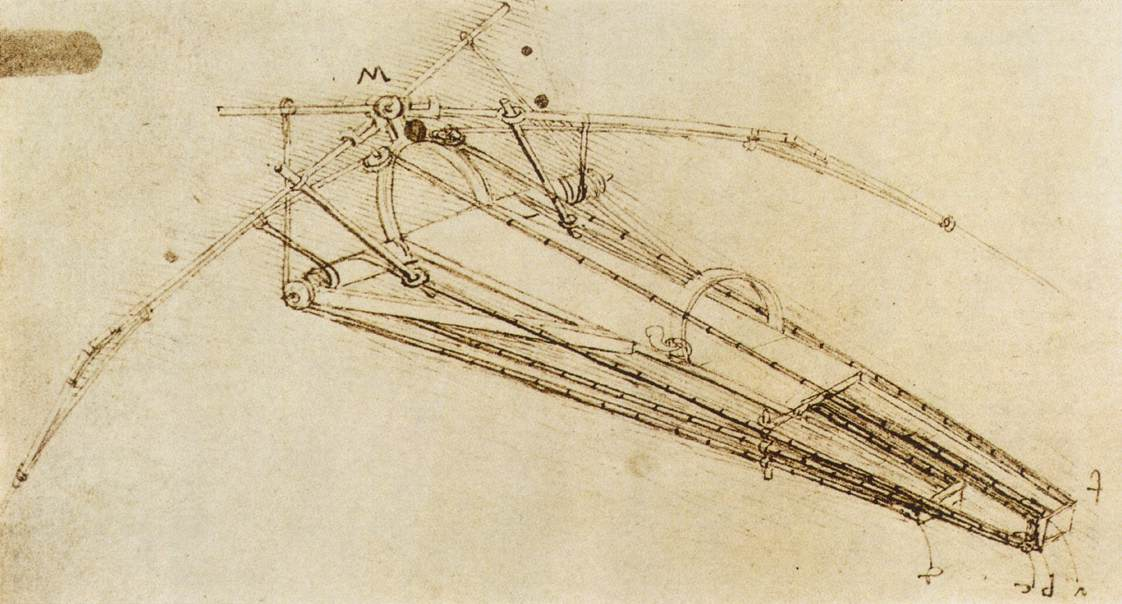
A design for a flying machine (c. 1488), first presented in the Codex on the Flight of Birds

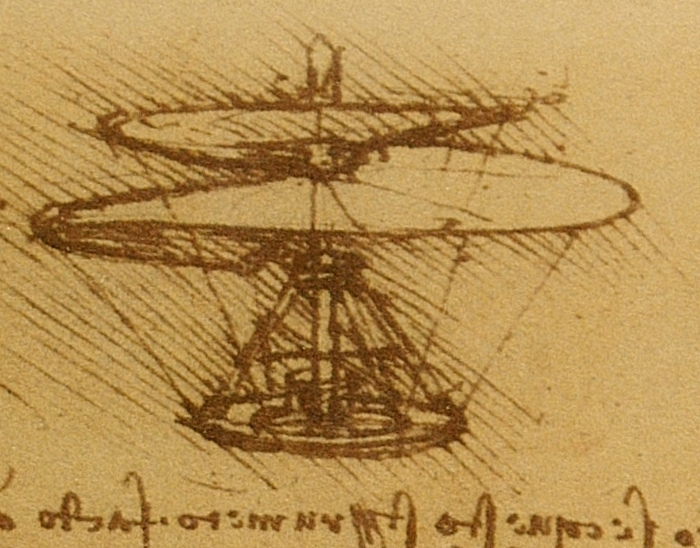
An aerial screw (c. 1489), suggestive of a helicopter, from the Codex Atlanticus

Engineers develop new technological solutions. During the engineering design process, the responsibilities of the engineer may include defining problems, conducting and narrowing research, analyzing criteria, finding and analyzing solutions, and making decisions. Much of an engineer's time is spent on researching, locating, applying, and transferring information. Indeed, research suggests engineers spend 56% of their time engaged in various information behaviours, including 14% actively searching for information.

Engineers weigh different design choices on their merits and choose the solution that best matches the requirements and needs. Their task is to identify, understand, and interpret the constraints on a design in order to produce a successful result. The work of an engineer requires problem solving skills.

=== Analysis ===
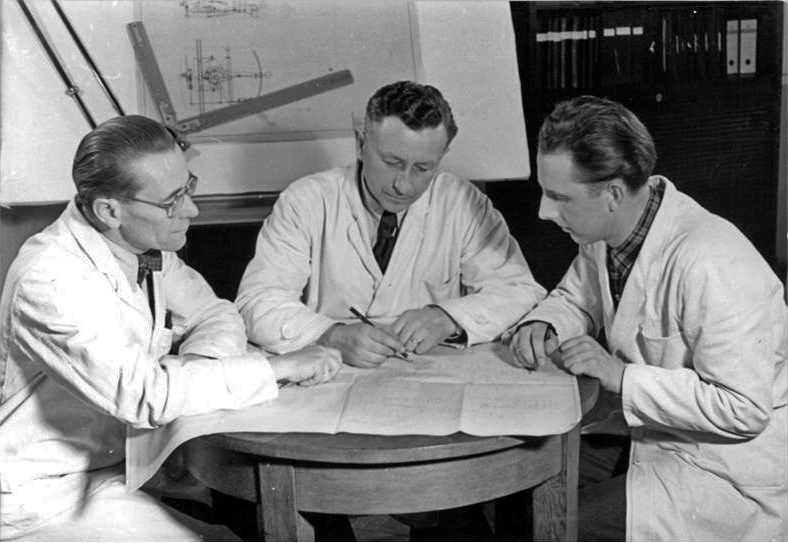
Engineers conferring on prototype design, 1954

Engineers apply techniques of engineering analysis in testing, production, or maintenance. Analytical engineers may supervise production in factories and elsewhere, determine the causes of a process failure, and test output to maintain quality. They also estimate the time and cost required to complete projects. Supervisory engineers are responsible for major components or entire projects. Engineering analysis involves the application of scientific analytic principles and processes to reveal the properties and state of the system, device or mechanism under study. Engineering analysis proceeds by separating the engineering design into the mechanisms of operation or failure, analyzing or estimating each component of the operation or failure mechanism in isolation, and recombining the components. They may analyze risk.

Many engineers use computers to produce and analyze designs, to simulate and test how a machine, structure, or system operates, to generate specifications for parts, to monitor the quality of products, and to control the efficiency of processes.

=== Specialization and management ===
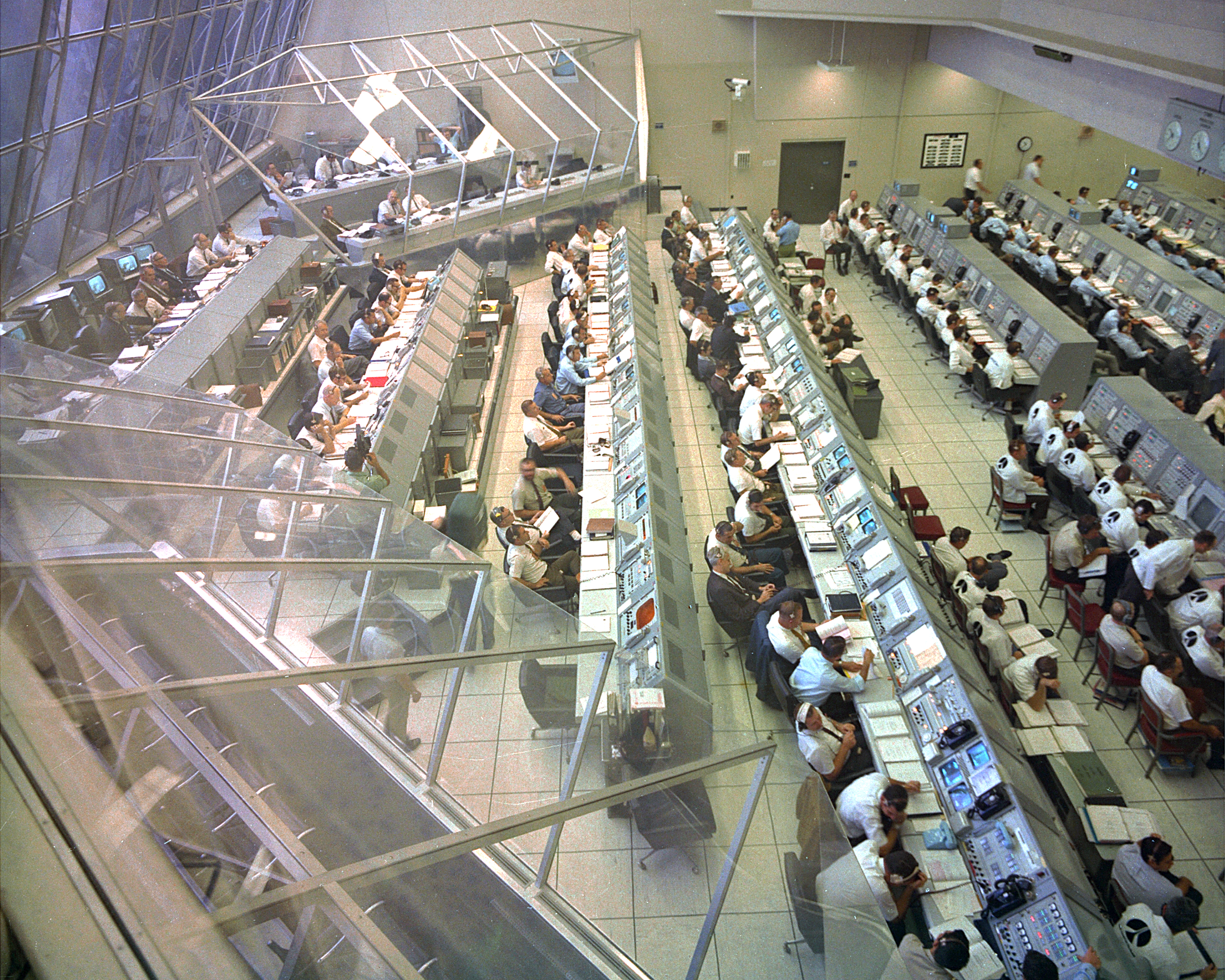
NASA Launch Control Center Firing Room 2 as it appeared in the Apollo era

Most engineers specialize in one or more engineering disciplines. Numerous specialties are recognized by professional societies, and each of the major branches of engineering has numerous subdivisions. Civil engineering, for example, includes structural engineering, along with transportation engineering, geotechnical engineering, and materials engineering, including ceramic, metallurgical, and polymer engineering. Mechanical engineering cuts across most disciplines since its core essence is applied physics. Engineers also may specialize in one industry, such as motor vehicles, or in one type of technology, such as turbines or semiconductor materials.

Several recent studies have investigated how engineers spend their time; that is, the work tasks they perform and how their time is distributed among these. Research suggests that there are several key themes present in engineers' work: technical work (i.e., the application of science to product development), social work (i.e., interactive communication between people), computer-based work and information behaviors. Among other more detailed findings, a 2012 work sampling study found that engineers spend 62.92% of their time engaged in technical work, 40.37% in social work, and 49.66% in computer-based work. Furthermore, there was considerable overlap between these different types of work, with engineers spending 24.96% of their time engaged in technical and social work, 37.97% in technical and non-social, 15.42% in non-technical and social, and 21.66% in non-technical and non-social.

Engineering is also an information-intensive field, with research finding that engineers spend 55.8% of their time engaged in various different information behaviors, including 14.2% actively seeking information from other people (7.8%) and information repositories such as documents and databases (6.4%).

The time engineers spend engaged in such activities is also reflected in the competencies required in engineering roles. In addition to engineers' core technical competence, research has also demonstrated the critical nature of their personal attributes, project management skills, and cognitive abilities to success in the role.

== Types of engineers ==
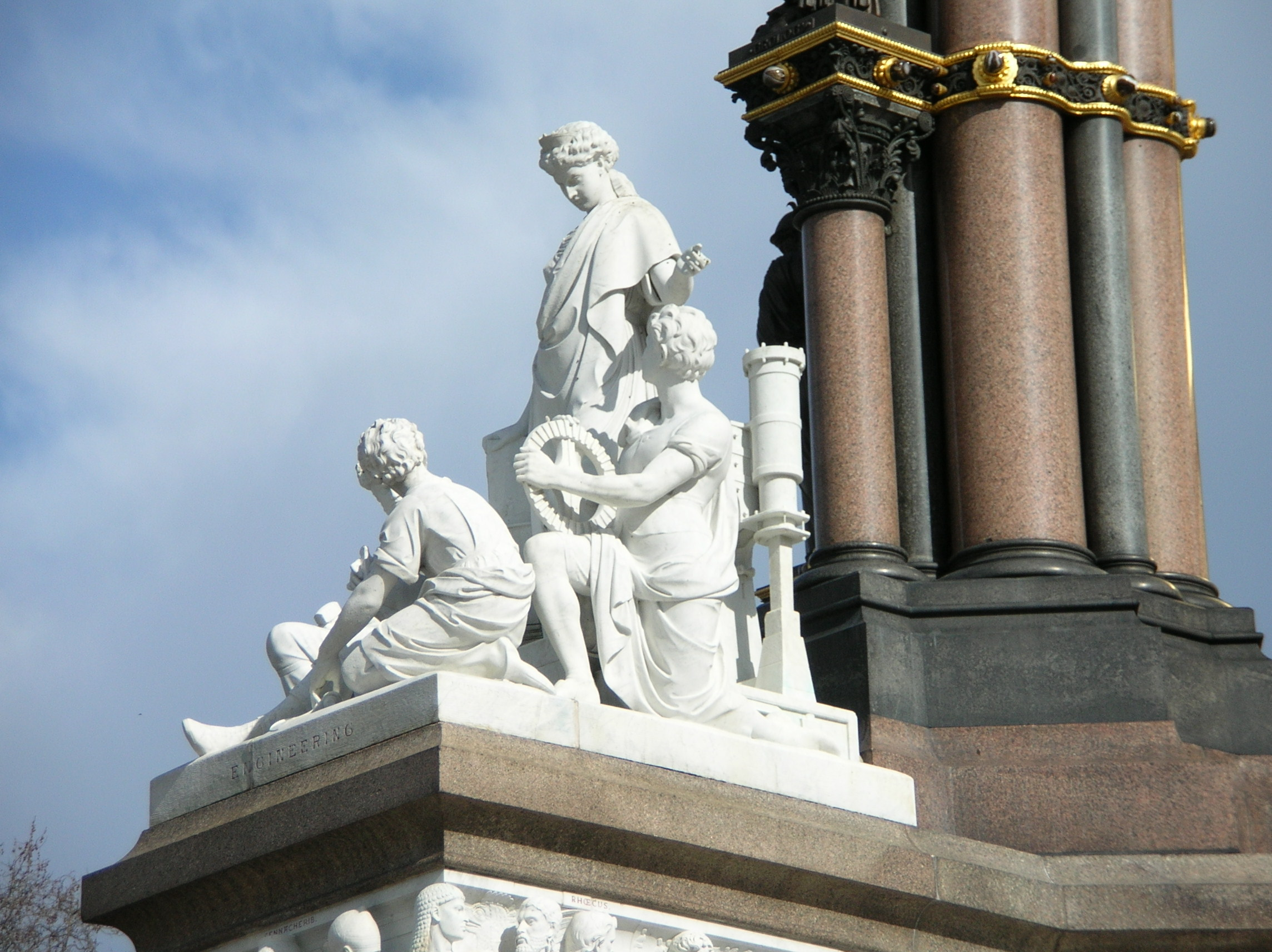
Photograph of the Engineering group, sculpted by John Lawlor, Albert Memorial

There are many branches of engineering, each of which specializes in specific technologies and products. Typically, engineers will have deep knowledge in one area and basic knowledge in related areas. For example, mechanical engineering curricula typically include introductory courses in electrical engineering, computer science, materials science, metallurgy, mathematics, and software engineering.

An engineer may either be hired for a firm that requires engineers on a continuous basis, or may belong to an engineering firm that provides engineering consulting services to other firms.

When developing a product, engineers typically work in interdisciplinary teams. For example, when building robots an engineering team will typically have at least three types of engineers. A mechanical engineer would design the body and actuators. An electrical engineer would design the power systems, sensors, electronics, embedded software in electronics, and control circuitry. Finally, a software engineer would develop the software that makes the robot behave properly. Engineers that aspire to management engage in further study in business administration, project management and organizational or business psychology. Often engineers move up the management hierarchy from managing projects, functional departments, and divisions, and some eventually become CEOs of multi-national corporations.

| Branch | Focus | Related sciences | Products |
|---|---|---|---|
| Automobile engineering | Focuses on the development of automobiles and related technology | Structural engineering, electronics, materials science, automotive safety, fluid mechanics, thermodynamics, engineering mathematics, ergonomics, environmental compliance, road traffic safety, chemistry | Automobiles |
| Aerospace engineering | Focuses on the development of aircraft and spacecraft | Aeronautics, astrodynamics, astronautics, avionics, control engineering, fluid mechanics, kinematics, materials science, thermodynamics | Aircraft, robotics, spacecraft, trajectories |
| Agricultural engineering | Focuses on the engineering, science, and technology for the production and processing of food from agriculture, such as the production of arable crops, soft fruit and livestock. A key goal of this discipline is to improve the efficacy and sustainability of agricultural practices for food production. | Agricultural engineering often combines and converges many other engineering disciplines such as mechanical engineering, civil engineering, electrical engineering, chemical engineering, biosystems engineering, soil science, environmental engineering | Livestock, food, horticulture, forestry, renewable energy crops. Agricultural machinery such as tractors, combine harvesters, forage harvesters. Agricultural technology incorporates such things as robotics and autonomous vehicles. |
| Architectural engineering and building engineering | Focuses on building and construction | Architecture, architectural technology | Buildings and bridges |
| Biomedical engineering | Focuses on closing the gap between engineering and medicine to advance various health care treatments | Biology, physics, chemistry, medicine | Prostheses, medical devices, regenerative tissue growth, various safety mechanisms, genetic engineering |
| Chemical engineering | Focuses on the transformation of raw materials into useful products in large scale | Chemistry, thermodynamics, chemical thermodynamics, process engineering, transport phenomena, nanotechnology, biology, chemical kinetics, genetic engineering medicine, fluid mechanics, textiles | Synthetic chemicals, fuels, medicines, raw materials, foods and beverages, waste and water treatment, pure gases, plastics, coatings, textiles |
| Civil engineering | Focuses on the construction of large systems, structures, and environmental systems | Statics, fluid mechanics, soil mechanics, structural engineering, transportation engineering, geotechnical engineering, environmental engineering, hydraulic engineering, construction engineering | Roads, bridges, dams, buildings, structural system, foundation, earthworks, waste management, water treatment |
| Computer engineering | Focuses on the design and development of computer hardware & software systems | Computer science, mathematics, electrical engineering | Microprocessors, microcontrollers, operating systems, embedded systems, computer networks |
| Electrical engineering | Focuses on application of electricity, electronics, and electromagnetism | Mathematics, probability and statistics, engineering ethics, engineering economics, instrumentation, materials science, physics, network analysis, electromagnetism, linear system, electronics, electric power, logic, computer science, data transmission, systems engineering, control engineering, signal processing | Electricity generation and equipment, remote sensing, robotics, control system, computers, home appliances, internet of things, consumer electronics, avionics, hybrid vehicles, spacecraft, unmanned aerial vehicles, optoelectronics, embedded systems |
| Fire protection engineering | Focuses on application of science and engineering principles to protect people, property, and their environments from the harmful and destructive effects of fire and smoke. | Fire, smoke, fluid dynamics, thermodynamics, heat transfer, combustion, physics, materials science, chemistry, statics, dynamics, probabilistic risk assessment or risk management, environmental psychology, engineering ethics, engineering economics, systems engineering, reliability, fire suppression, fire alarms, building fire safety, wildfire, building codes, measurement and simulation of fire phenomena, mathematics, probability and statistics. | Fire suppression systems, fire alarm systems, passive fire protection, smoke control systems, sprinkler systems, code consulting, fire and smoke modeling, emergency management, water supply systems, fire pumps, structural fire protection, foam extinguishing systems, gaseous fire suppression systems, oxygen reduction systems, flame detection, aerosol fire suppression. |
| Industrial engineering | Focuses on the design, optimization, and operation of production, logistics, and service systems and processes | Operations research, engineering statistics, applied probability and stochastic processes, automation engineering, methods engineering, production engineering, manufacturing engineering, systems engineering, logistics engineering, ergonomics | quality control systems, manufacturing systems, warehousing systems, supply chains, logistics networks, queueing systems, business process management |
| Mechatronics engineering | Focuses on the technology and controlling all the industrial field | Process control, automation | Robotics, controllers, CNC |
| Mechanical engineering | Focuses on the development and operation of energy systems, transport systems, manufacturing systems, machines and control systems | Dynamics, kinematics, statics, fluid mechanics, materials science, metallurgy, strength of materials, thermodynamics, heat transfer, mechanics, mechatronics, manufacturing engineering, control engineering | Cars, airplanes, machines, power generation, spacecraft, buildings, consumer goods, manufacturing, HVAC |
| Metallurgical engineering/materials engineering | Focuses on extraction of metals from its ores and development of new materials | Material science, thermodynamics, extraction of metals, physical metallurgy, mechanical metallurgy, nuclear materials, steel technology | Iron, steel, polymers, ceramics, metals |
| Mining engineering | Focuses on the use of applied science and technology to extract various minerals from the earth, not to be confused with metallurgical engineering, which deals with mineral processing of various ores after they have already been mined | Rock mechanics, geostatistics, soil mechanics, control engineering, geology, metallurgy, geophysics, fluid mechanics, drilling and blasting | Gold, silver, coal, iron ore, potash, limestone, diamond, rare-earth element, bauxite, copper |
| Military engineering | Focuses on constructions and repairs of military structures (such as airfield, naval shipyards, barracks, missile silos etc.) as well as repairing damaged structures or producing/repairing combat vehicles, aircraft or seacraft | Military science | Weapon, ammunition, tanks, attack helicopters, fighters, bombers, military bases, warships, carrier, submarines, ballistic missiles |
| Software engineering | Focuses on the design and development of software systems | Computer science, Computing, information theory, systems engineering, formal language | Application software, Mobile apps, Websites, operating systems, embedded systems, real-time computing, video games, virtual reality, AI software, edge computing, distributed systems, computer vision, music sequencers, digital audio workstations, software synthesizers, robotics, CGI, medical software, computer-assisted surgery, internet of things, avionics software, computer simulation, quantum programming, satellite navigation software, antivirus software, electronic design automation, computer-aided design, self-driving cars, educational software |

== Ethics ==
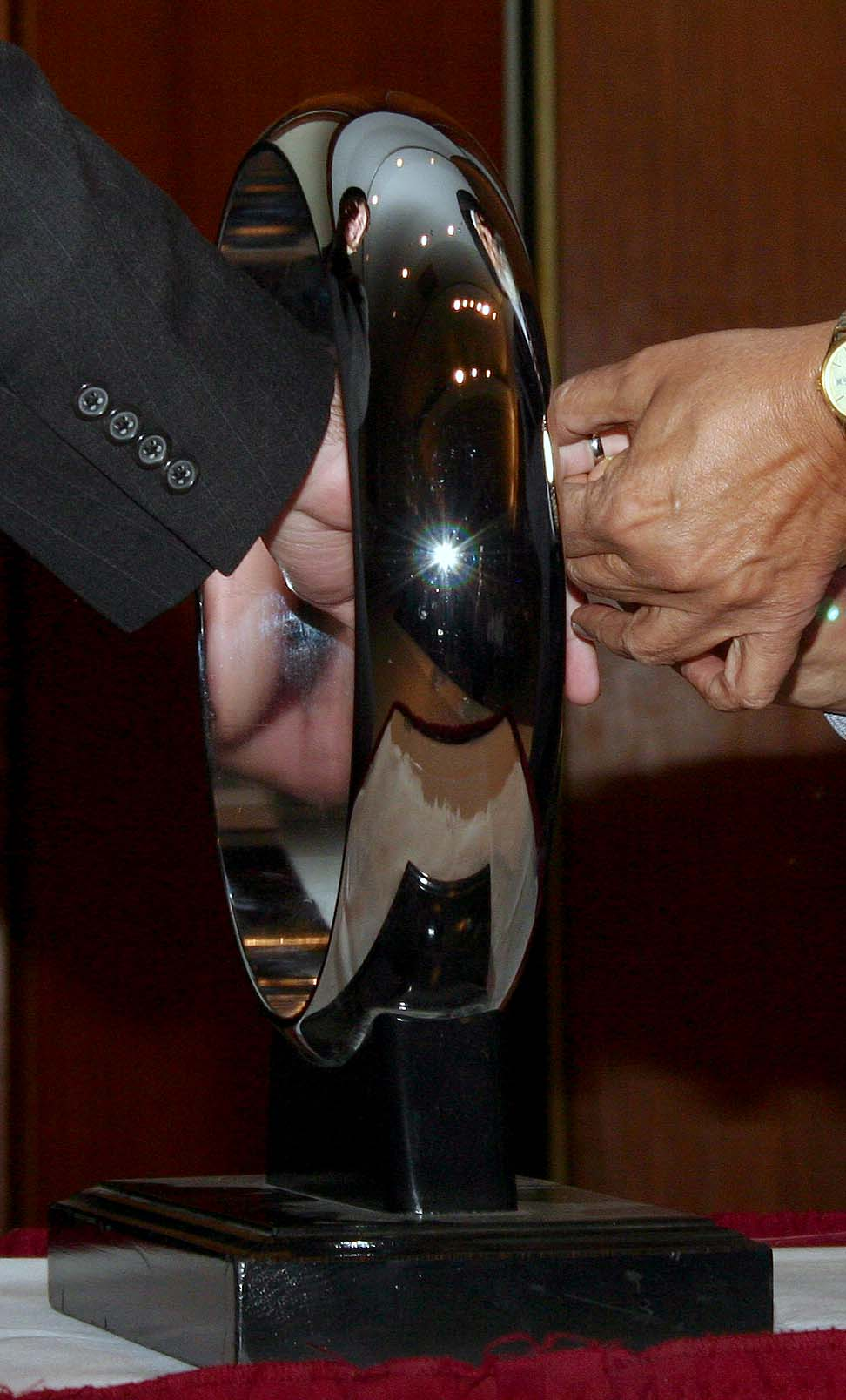
An engineer receiving his Order of the Engineer ring

Engineers have obligations to the public, their clients, employers, and the profession. Many engineering societies have established codes of practice and codes of ethics to guide members and inform the public at large. Each engineering discipline and professional society maintains a code of ethics, which the members pledge to uphold. Depending on their specializations, engineers may also be governed by specific statute, whistleblowing, product liability laws, and often the principles of business ethics.

Some graduates of engineering programs in North America may be recognized by the iron ring or Engineer's Ring, a ring made of iron or stainless steel that is worn on the little finger of the dominant hand. This tradition began in 1925 in Canada with The Ritual of the Calling of an Engineer, where the ring serves as a symbol and reminder of the engineer's obligations to the engineering profession. In 1972, the practice was adopted by several colleges in the United States including members of the Order of the Engineer.

== Education ==
Most engineering programs involve a concentration of study in an engineering specialty, along with courses in both mathematics and the physical and life sciences. Many programs also include courses in general engineering and applied accounting. A design course, often accompanied by a computer or laboratory class or both, is part of the curriculum of most programs. Often, general courses not directly related to engineering, such as those in the social sciences or humanities, also are required.

Accreditation is the process by which engineering programs are evaluated by an external body to determine if applicable standards are met. The Washington Accord serves as an international accreditation agreement for academic engineering degrees, recognizing the substantial equivalency in the standards set by many major national engineering bodies. In the United States, post-secondary degree programs in engineering are accredited by the Accreditation Board for Engineering and Technology.

== Regulation ==
Footage of the old Tacoma Narrows Bridge Narrows Bridge collapsing (19.1MiB video, 02:30)

In many countries, engineering tasks such as the design of bridges, electric power plants, industrial equipment, machine design and chemical plants, must be approved by a licensed professional engineer. Most commonly titled professional engineer is a license to practice and is indicated with the use of post-nominal letters; PE or P.Eng. These are common in North America, as is European engineer (EUR ING) in Europe.

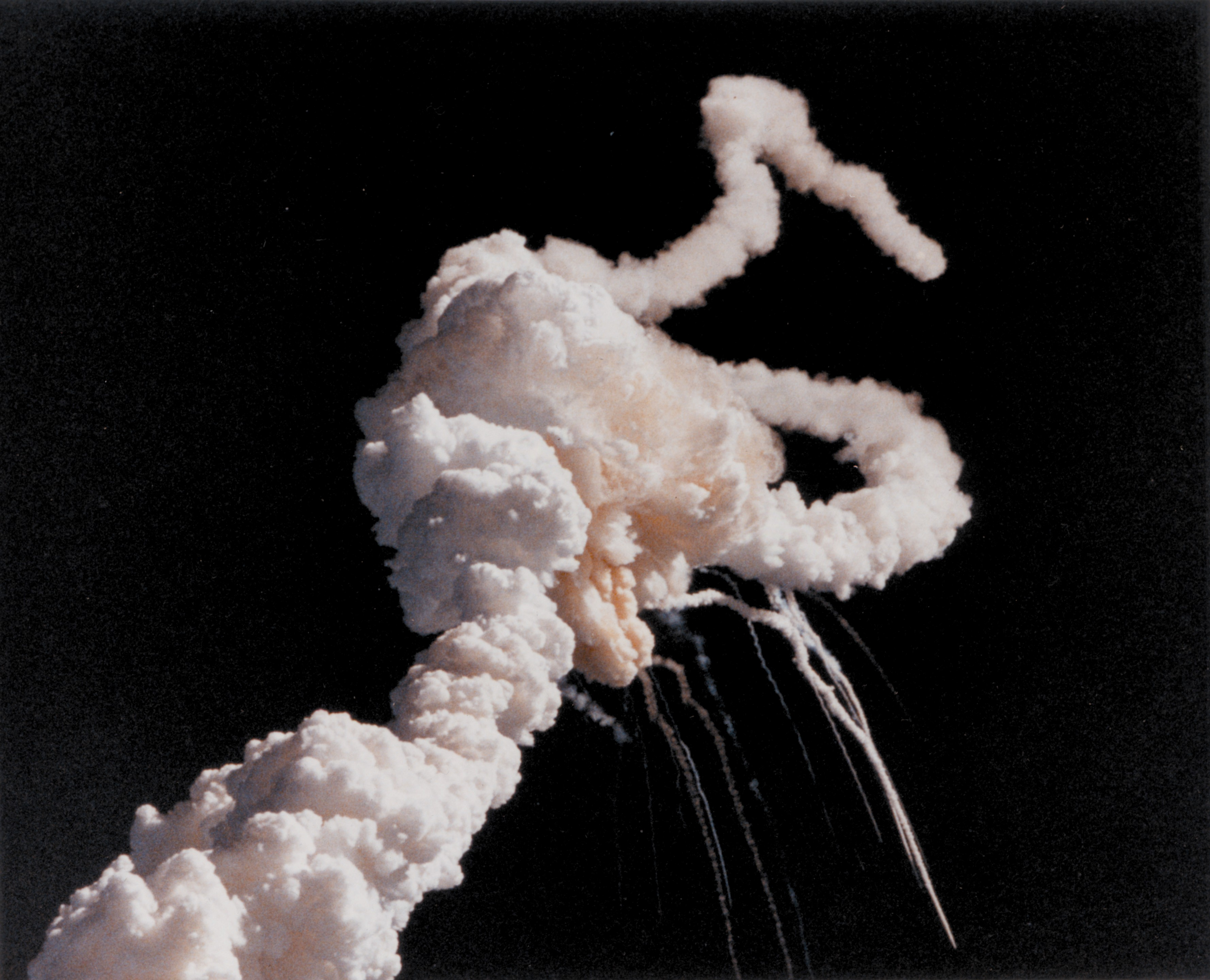
The Challenger disaster is held as a case study of engineering ethics

In the United States, engineering is a regulated profession whose practice and practitioners are licensed and governed by law. Licensure is generally attainable through combination of education, pre-examination (Fundamentals of Engineering exam), examination (professional engineering exam), and engineering experience (typically in the area of 5+ years). Each state tests and licenses professional engineers. Currently, most states do not license by specific engineering discipline, but rather provide generalized licensure, and trust engineers to use professional judgment regarding their individual competencies; this is the favoured approach of the professional societies. Despite this, at least one of the examinations required by most states is actually focused on a particular discipline; candidates for licensure typically choose the category of examination which comes closest to their respective expertise. In the United States, an "industrial exemption" allows businesses to employ employees and call them an "engineer", as long as such individuals are under the direct supervision and control of the business entity and function internally related to manufacturing (manufactured parts) related to the business entity, or work internally within an exempt organization. Such person does not have the final authority to approve, or the ultimate responsibility for, engineering designs, plans, or specifications that are to be incorporated into fixed works, systems, or facilities on the property of others or made available to the public. These individuals are prohibited from offering engineering services directly to the public or other businesses, or engage in practice of engineering unless the business entity is registered with the state's board of engineering, and the practice is carried on or supervised directly only by engineers licensed to engage in the practice of engineering. In some instances, some positions, such as a "sanitation engineer", does not have any basis in engineering sciences. Although some states require a BS degree in engineering accredited by the Engineering Accreditation Commission (EAC) of Accreditation Board for Engineering and Technology (ABET) with no exceptions, about two thirds of the states accept BS degrees in engineering technology accredited by the Engineering Technology Accreditation Commission (ETAC) of ABET to become licensed as professional engineers. Each state has different requirements on years of experience to take the Fundamentals of Engineering (FE) and Professional Engineering (PE) exams. A few states require a graduate MS in engineering to sit for the exams as further learning. After seven years of working after graduation, two years of responsibility for significant engineering work, continuous professional development, some highly qualified PEs are able to become International Professional Engineers Int(PE). These engineers must meet the highest level of professional competencies and this is a peer-reviewed process. Once the IntPE title is awarded, the engineer can gain easier admission to national registers of a number of members jurisdictions for international practice.

In Canada, engineering is a self-regulated profession. The profession in each province is governed by its own engineering association. For instance, in the province of British Columbia an engineering graduate with four or more years of post graduate experience in an engineering-related field and passing exams in ethics and law will need to be registered by the Association for Professional Engineers and Geoscientists (APEGBC) in order to become a Professional Engineer and be granted the professional designation of P.Eng allowing one to practice engineering.

In Continental Europe, Latin America, Turkey, and elsewhere the title is limited by law to people with an engineering degree and the use of the title by others is illegal. In Italy, the title is limited to people who hold an engineering degree, have passed a professional qualification examination (Esame di Stato) and are enrolled in the register of the local branch of National Associations of Engineers (a public body). In Portugal, professional engineer titles and accredited engineering degrees are regulated and certified by the Ordem dos Engenheiros. In the Czech Republic, the title "engineer" (Ing.) is given to people with a (master's) degree in chemistry, technology or economics for historical and traditional reasons. In Greece, the academic title of "Diploma Engineer" is awarded after completion of the five-year engineering study course and the title of "Certified Engineer" is awarded after completion of the four-year course of engineering studies at a Technological Educational Institute (TEI).

== Definition by country ==
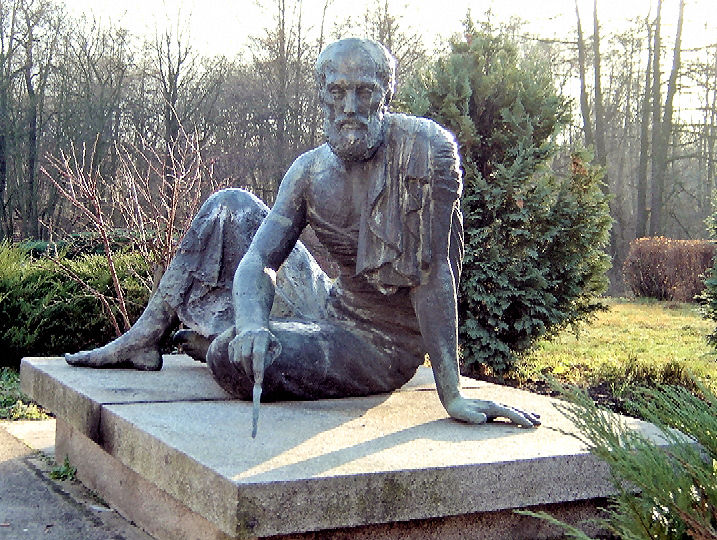
Archimedes is regarded as one of the leading scientists in classical antiquity whose ideas have underpinned much of the practice of engineering.

The definition of the term "engineer" varies across countries and continents.

=== Asia and Africa ===
In the Indian subcontinent, Russia, Middle East, Africa, and China, engineering is one of the most sought-after undergraduate courses, for which entrance examinations are highly competitive.

In Egypt, the educational system makes engineering the second-most respected profession in the country (after medicine); engineering colleges at Egyptian universities require extremely high marks on the General Certificate of Secondary Education (Arabic: الثانوية العامة al-Thānawiyyah al-`Āmmah) – in the order of 97 or 98 per cent – and are thus considered (along with the colleges of medicine, natural science, and pharmacy) to be among the "pinnacle colleges" (كليات القمة kullīyāt al-qimmah).

In the Philippines and Filipino communities overseas, engineers who are either Filipino or not, especially those who also profess other jobs at the same time, are addressed and introduced as Engineer, rather than Sir/Madam in speech or Mr./Mrs./Ms. (G./Gng./Bb. in Filipino) before surnames. That word is used either in itself or before the given name or surname.

=== Europe ===
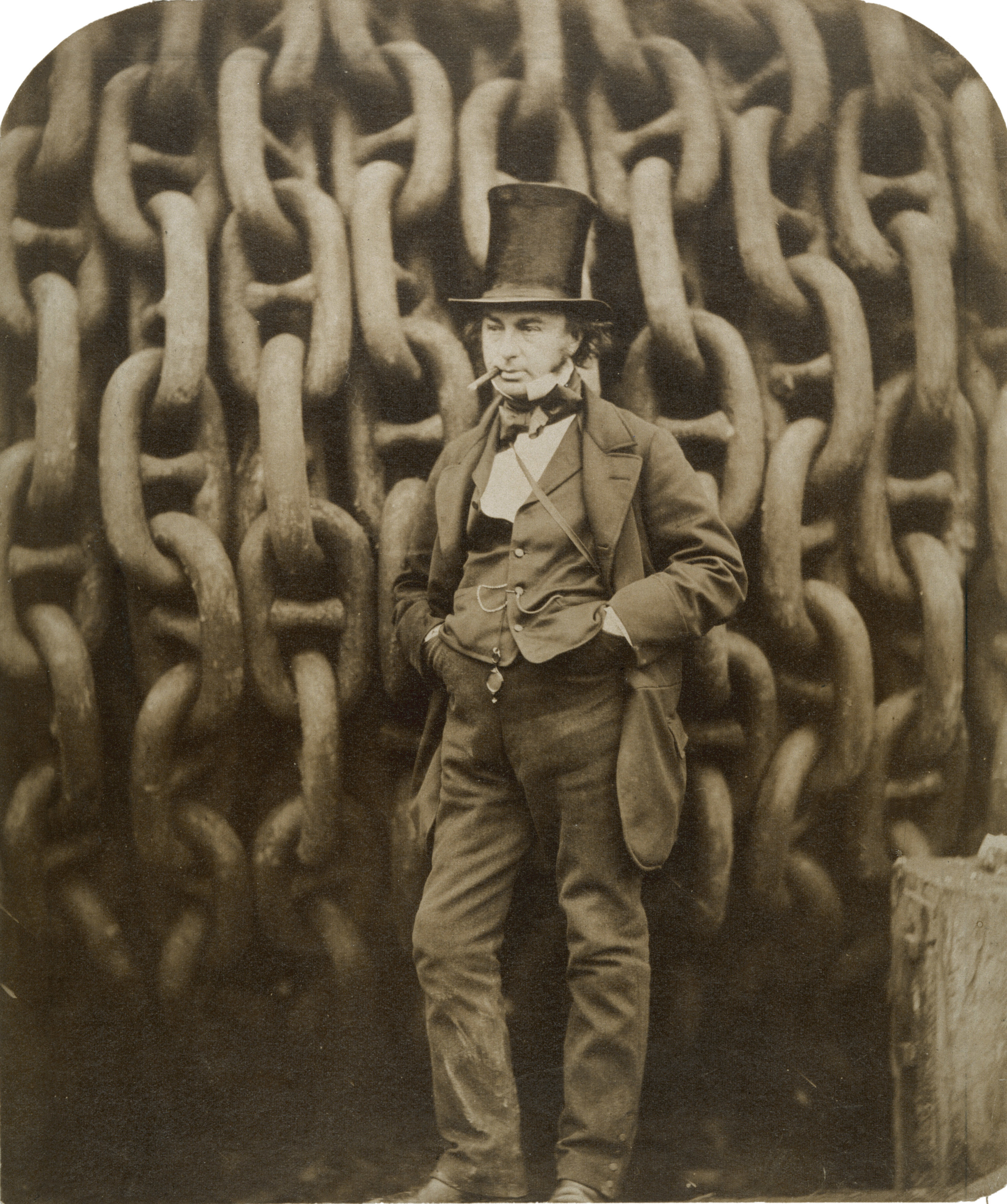
19th-century engineer Isambard Kingdom Brunel by the launching chains of the SS Great Eastern.

As of 2022, thirty two countries in Europe (including nearly all 27 countries of the EU) now recognise the title of "European Engineer" which permits the use of the pre-nominal title of "EUR ING" (always fully capitalised). Each country sets its own precise qualification requirement for the use of the title (though they are all broadly equivalent). Holding the requisite qualification does not afford automatic entitlement. The title has to be applied for (and the appropriate fee paid). The holder is entitled to use the title in their passport. EUR INGs are allowed to describe themselves as professionally qualified engineers and practise as such in any of the 32 participating countries including those where the title of engineer is regulated by law.

==== France ====
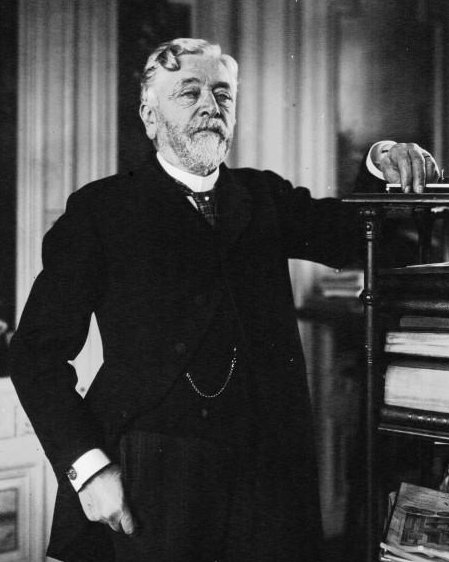
Gustave Eiffel was a French civil engineer.

In France, the term ingénieur (engineer) is not a protected title and can be used by anyone who practices this profession.

However, the title ingénieur diplomé (graduate engineer) is an official academic title that is protected by the government and is associated with the Diplôme d'Ingénieur, which is a renowned academic degree in France. Anyone misusing this title in France can be fined a large sum and jailed, as it is usually reserved for graduates of French engineering grandes écoles. Engineering schools which were created during the French revolution have a special reputation among the French people, as they helped to make the transition from a mostly agricultural country of late 18th century to the industrially developed France of the 19th century. A great part of 19th-century France's economic wealth and industrial prowess was created by engineers that have graduated from École Centrale Paris, École des Mines de Paris, École polytechnique or Télécom Paris. This was also the case after WWII when France had to be rebuilt. Before the "réforme René Haby" in the 1970s, it was very difficult to be admitted to such schools, and the French ingénieurs were commonly perceived as the nation's élite. However, after the Haby reform and a series of further reforms (Modernization plans of French universities), several engineering schools were created which can be accessed with relatively lower competition.

Engineering positions in France are now shared between the ingénieurs diplomés graduating from engineering grandes écoles and the holders of a master's degree in science from public universities.

==== Italy ====
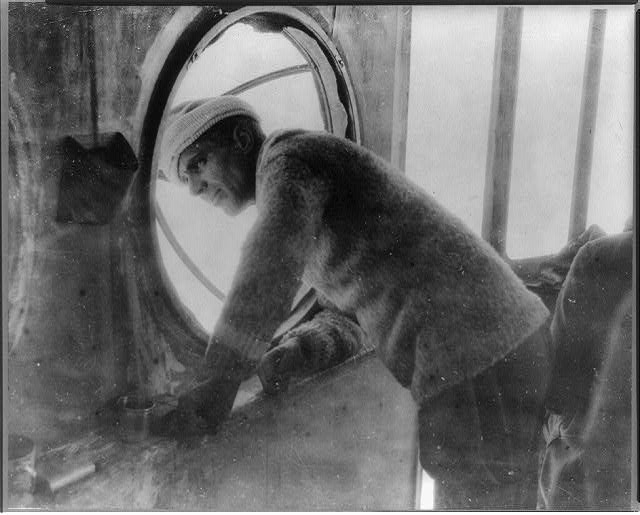
Umberto Nobile was an aeronautical engineer and Arctic explorer.

In Italy, only people who hold a formal engineering qualification of at least a bachelor's degree are permitted to describe themselves as an engineer. So much so that people holding such qualifications are entitled to use the pre-nominal title of "Ingegnere" (or "Ingegnera" if female - in both cases often abbreviated to "Ing.") in lieu of "Signore", "Signorina" or "Signora" (Mr, Miss and Mrs respectively) in the same manner as someone holding a doctorate would use the pre-nominal title "Doctor".

==== United Kingdom ====
In the UK, the practice of engineering is not a regulated profession but control of the titles of chartered engineer (CEng) and incorporated engineer (IEng) is regulated. These titles are protected by law and are subject to strict requirements defined by the Engineering Council. The title CEng is in use in nations of the Commonwealth of Nations that follow or adapt British professional codes.

Many skilled and semi-skilled tradespeople in the UK, including, for example, engineering technicians who service domestic appliances or telephone systems, call themselves engineers, and the term in that context is commonly used by the public. Proposals such as a 2015 petition to the UK parliament to legally protect the title "engineer" so that only professional engineers could use it have been unsuccessful (as of 2023)

=== North America ===
==== Canada ====
In Canada, engineering is a regulated profession whose practice and practitioners are licensed and governed by law. Licensed professional engineers are referred to as P.Eng. Many Canadian engineers wear an Iron Ring.

In all Canadian provinces, the title "Professional Engineer" is protected by law and any non-licensed individual or company using the title is committing a legal offence and is subject to fines and restraining orders. Contrary to insistence from the Professional Engineers Ontario ("PEO") and Engineers Canada, use of the title "Engineer" itself has been found by Canadian law to be acceptable by those not holding P.Eng. titles.

The title of engineer is not exclusive to P.Eng titles. The title of Engineer is commonly held by "Software Engineer", the Canadian Military as various ranks and positions, railway locomotive engineers, Stationary engineer and Aircraft Maintenance Engineers (AME), all of which do not commonly hold a P.Eng. designation.

==== United States ====
In the United States, the practice of professional engineering is highly regulated and the title "professional engineer" is legally protected, meaning that it is unlawful to use it to offer engineering services to the public unless permission, certification or other official endorsement is specifically granted by that state through a professional engineering license.

=== Spanish-speaking countries ===
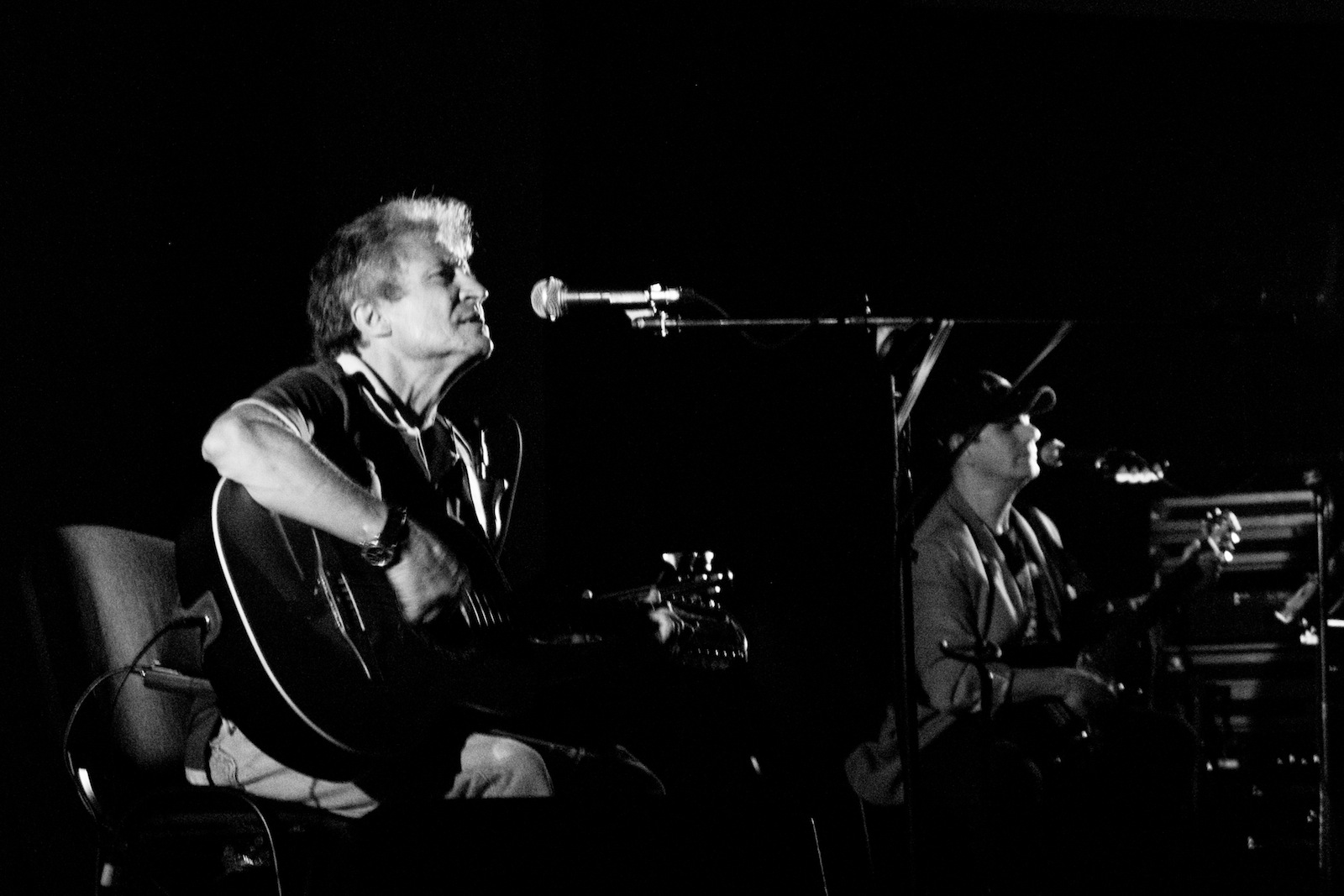
Baltasar Mena Iniesta a Spanish-born Mexican mechanical engineer specialized in Rheology.

Certain Spanish-speaking countries follow the Italian convention of engineers using the pre-nominal title, in this case "ingeniero" (or "ingeniera" if female). Like in Italy, it is usually abbreviated to "Ing." In Spain this practice is not followed.

The engineering profession enjoys high prestige in Spain, ranking close to medical doctors, scientists and professors, and above judges, journalists or entrepreneurs, according to a 2014 study.

== See also ==
- Building engineer
- Chartered Engineer (CEng)
- Engineer's degree
- Engineers Without Borders
- European Engineer
- Greatest Engineering Achievements
- History of engineering
- List of engineers
- List of engineering branches
- List of Engineering schools
- List of fictional scientists and engineers
