= Iron Ring =

Ring worn by Canadian engineers

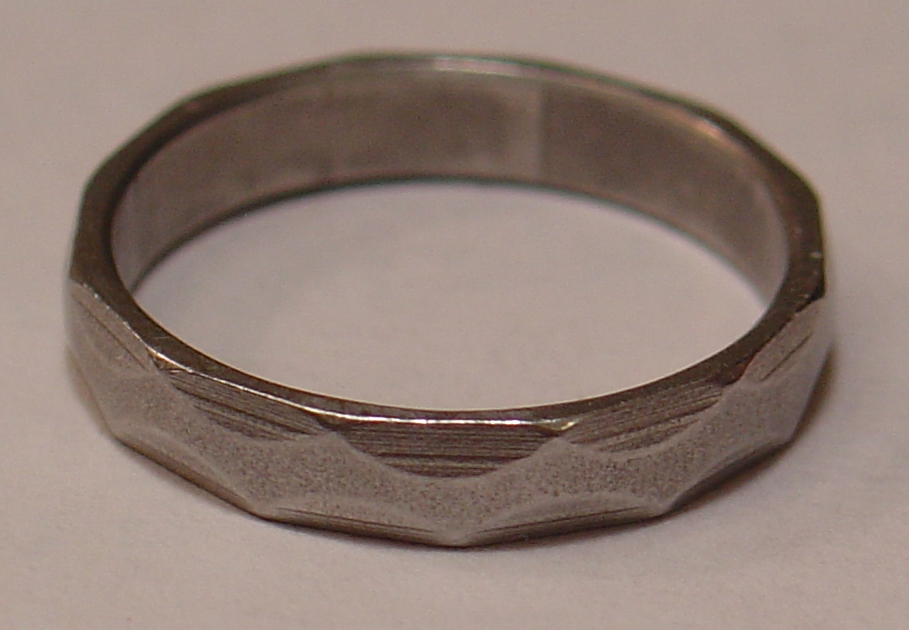
A modern Iron Ring made from stainless steel

The Iron Ring is a ring worn by many Canadian engineers as a symbol and reminder of the obligations and ethics associated with their profession. The ring is presented in a private ceremony known as the Ritual of the Calling of an Engineer. Qualification for the obligation ceremony is either completion of a CEAB accredited engineering program or meeting the academic standard for licensure with a provincial engineering regulator. The concept of the ritual and the rings originated from H. E. T. Haultain in 1922, with assistance from Rudyard Kipling, who crafted the ritual at Haultain's request.

Originally made from puddled iron, rings are often now made from stainless steel.

== Symbolism ==
The ring symbolizes the pride engineers have in their profession, while simultaneously reminding them of their humility. The ring serves as a reminder to the engineer and others of the engineer's obligation to live by a high standard of professional conduct. However, the ring is not a symbol of qualification as an engineer; engineering qualifications are determined by provincial and territorial licensing bodies.

== History ==
The first ring ceremony was held under the supervision of H. E. T. Haultain in 1925.

The Iron Ring originated from H. E. T. Haultain, a mining engineering professor at the University of Toronto. On 25 January 1922, Haultain proposed that engineers take an ethical oath. From 1922 to 1925, the structure that would administer the oaths, or "callings," was known as the Corporation of the Seven Wardens. The organization was named in honour of the first seven presidents of the Canadian Society for Civil Engineers.

The text of the calling was written by English poet Rudyard Kipling, at the request of Haultain. Haultain asked Kipling to author the calling partly because of Kipling's poem The Sons of Martha, which paid tribute to an engineer. Kipling's calling sought to emphasize the responsibilities of an engineer, affirming their responsibility to "not henceforward suffer or pass, or be privy to the passing of, Bad Workmanship or Faulty Material." Kipling's calling also affirmed that an engineer must not compromise their work, in spite of external pressures; and was a call for professional unity between engineers.

On the 25 April 1925, Haultain administered the first Ritual of the Calling of an Engineer in the University Club in Montreal. A second ritual was administered in Toronto on 1 May 1925. Iron Rings are awarded to engineers during the ritual, in reference to "[their] Honour and Cold Iron," a phrase used in the calling. A myth persists that the initial batch of Iron Rings was made from the beams of the first Quebec Bridge, a bridge that collapsed during construction in 1907 due to poor planning and design by the overseeing engineers. However, the initial batch of Iron Rings were actually produced by World War I veterans at Christie Street Military Hospital in Toronto.

The Wardens originally considered expanding the ritual to the United States. However, they later ruled against expansion, fearing a loss of control over the ritual. Efforts to secure control of the ritual were made in 1935, when the obligation was copyrighted, and the Corporation of the Seven Wardens formally incorporated in 1938.

== Design ==
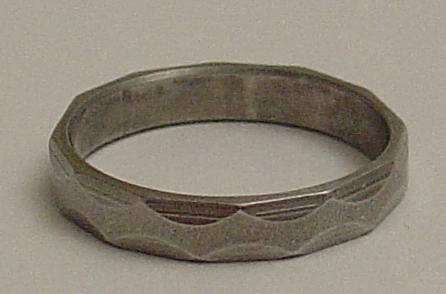
The Iron Ring is designed with facets on the ring's outer surface.

Originally made from puddled wrought iron, more recent versions are made from wrought iron or stainless steel. It is intended to be worn on the little finger of the working (dominant) hand. There, the facets act as a sharp reminder of one's obligation while the engineer works, because it could drag on the writing surface while the engineer is drawing or writing. This is particularly true of recently obligated engineers, whose rings bear sharp, unworn, facets. Protocol dictates that the rings should be returned by retired engineers or by the families of deceased engineers. Some camps offer previously obligated or "experienced" rings, but they are now rare due to medical and practical complications.

The Iron Ring is small and understated, and was designed as a constant reminder, rather than a piece of jewelry. The Rings were originally hammered manually with a rough outer surface. The modern machined ring shares a similar design as a reminder of the manual process. Twelve half-circle facets are carved into the top and bottom of the outer surface, with the two sets of facets offset rotationally by fifteen degrees.

Because iron deteriorates turning the finger black and making the ring fit more loosely, stainless steel is sometimes used in modern designs.

== Presentation ceremony ==
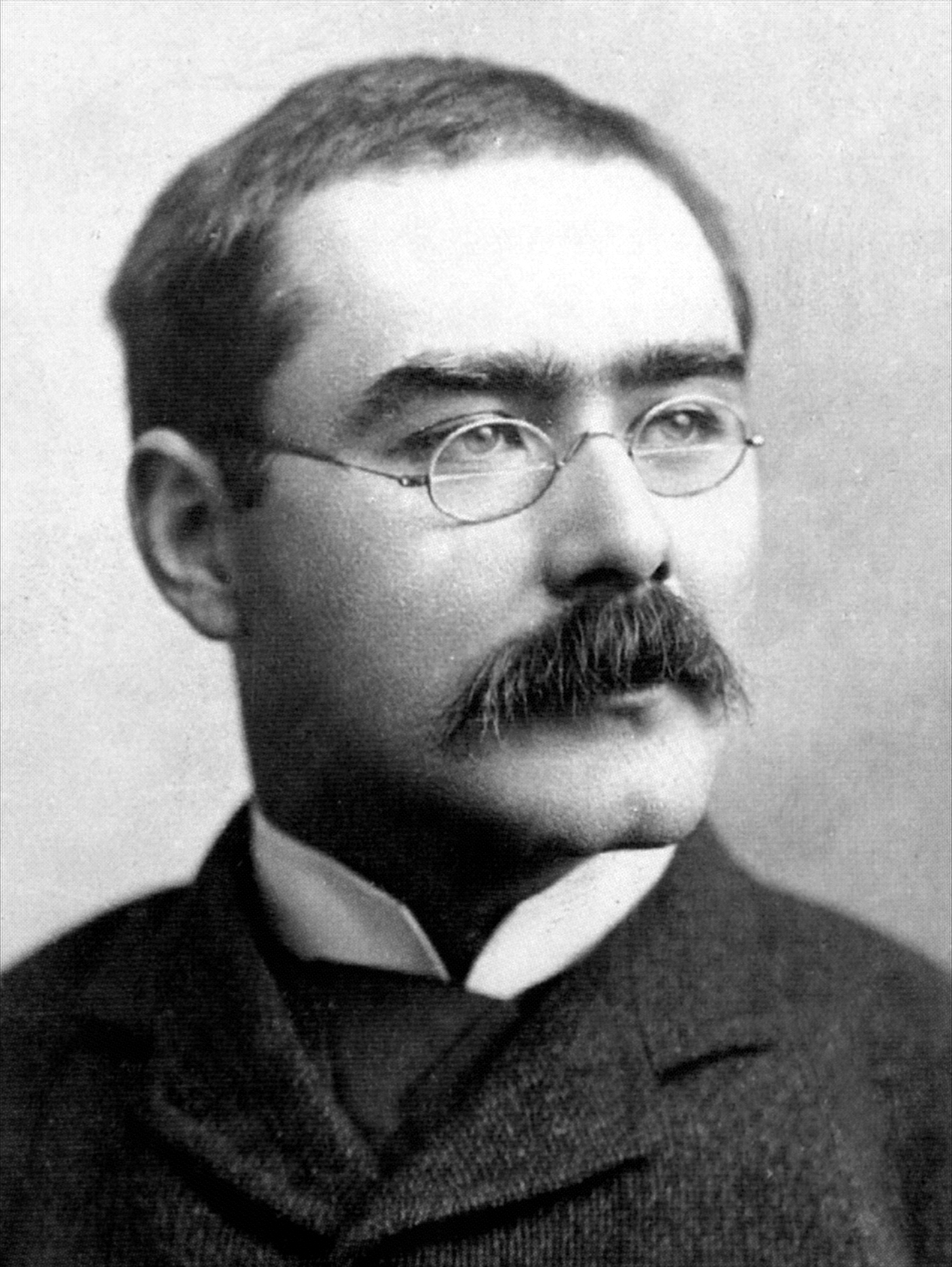
Rudyard Kipling authored the Ritual of the Calling of an Engineer in 1922, at the request of Haultain.

The Ritual of the Calling of an Engineer is the ceremony where graduating engineers participate in the "calling," and receive their Iron Rings. The ritual is intended to invoke the moral, ethical and professional commitment of an engineer, with the ring provided as a reminder of this obligation. The ceremonies are private affairs with no publicity. Invitations to attend are extended to local engineering alumni and professional engineers by those who are scheduled to participate. Some universities extend an invitation to witness the ceremony to anyone in the engineering profession; however, engineers that have not undergone the ritual are not permitted to participate in it. Some graduating engineers choose to receive a ring passed on from a relative or mentor, giving the ceremony a personal touch.

The rings are given during the ceremony held at individual universities, each assigned one of 28 camps of the Corporation of the Seven Wardens. All camps except Toronto have stopped conferring rings made of iron and have switched to stainless steel. At the Toronto camp, the individual ceremonies held at the University of Toronto, Toronto Metropolitan University, Ontario Tech University, and York University continue to provide recipients with a choice of rings made of iron or stainless steel.

== Similar practices ==
Based upon the success of the Iron Ring in Canada, a similar program was created in the United States, where the Order of the Engineer was founded in 1970. The organization conducts similar ring ceremonies at a number of U.S. colleges, in which the recipient signs an "Obligation of the Engineer" and receives a stainless steel Engineer's Ring (which, unlike the Canadian Iron Ring, can be smooth and not faceted). The first such ceremony occurred on June 4, 1970, at the Cleveland State University under the supervision of Lloyd Chancy.

The NTH Ring is a ring awarded by the Norwegian University of Science and Technology, formerly Norwegian Institute of Technology (NTH), to graduates of their Masters of Science in architecture or engineering programs.

== See also ==
- List of engineering awards
- Engineering traditions in Canada
- Engineer's Ring
- Hippocratic Oath
- Iron Ring Clock
- Pinky ring
