= Order of the Engineer =

Professional association

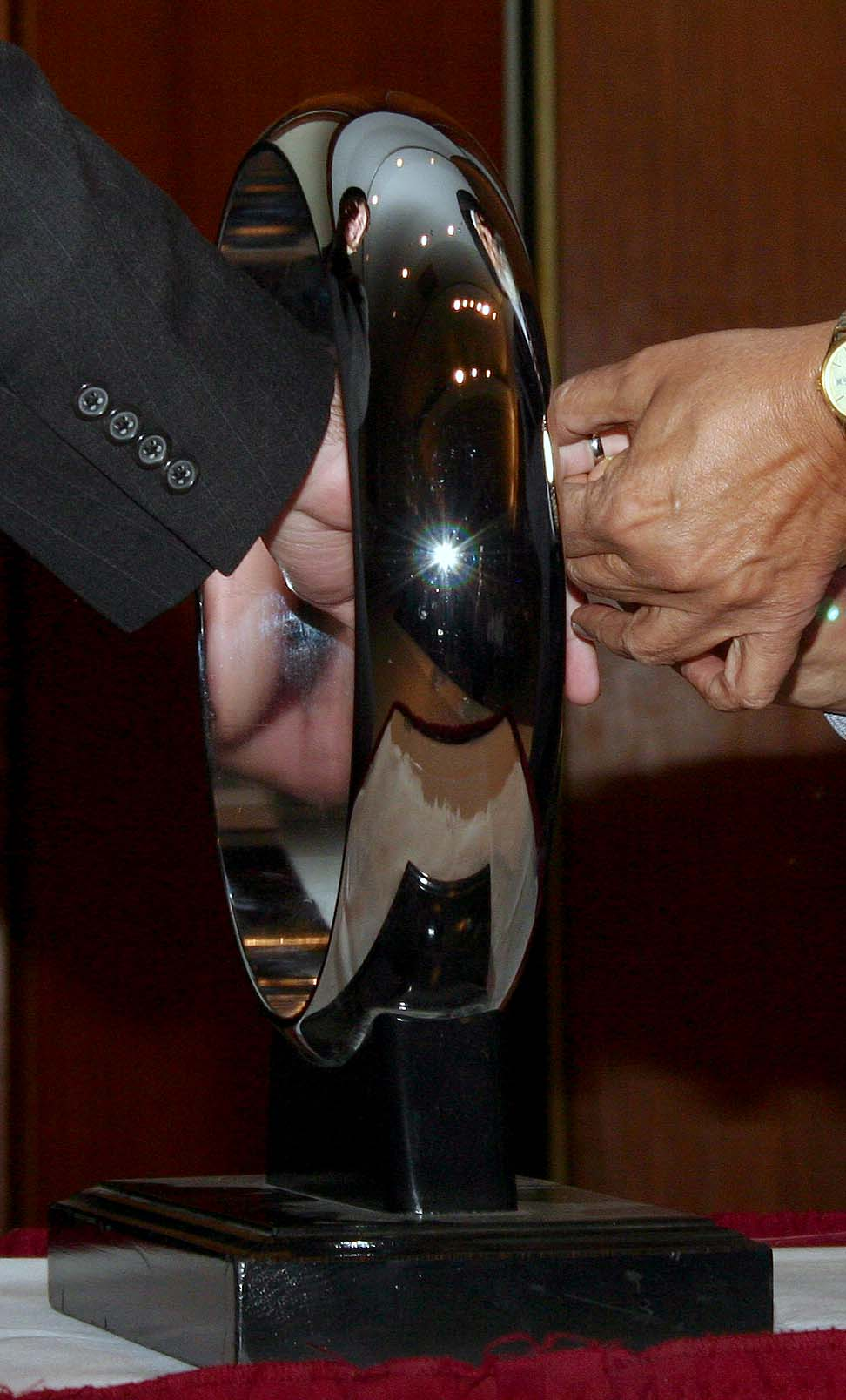
An engineer receives his ring in a ceremony at Wayne State University.

The Order of the Engineer is an association for graduate and professional engineers in the United States that emphasizes pride and responsibility in the engineering profession. It was inspired by the success of the Ritual of the Calling of an Engineer, a similar and much older Canadian ceremony, and has 245 active links (what the Order of the Engineer calls a chapter) across the United States.

== Oath ==
Before joining, members must take an oath to abide by a code of ethics called the "Obligation of an Engineer":

I am an Engineer. In my profession, I take deep pride. To it, I owe solemn obligations.

As an engineer, I pledge to practice integrity and fair dealing, tolerance and respect, and to uphold devotion to the standards and dignity of my profession. I will always be conscious that my skill carries with it the obligation to serve humanity by making the best use of the Earth's precious wealth.

As an engineer, I shall participate in none but honest enterprises. When needed, my skill and knowledge shall be given, without reservation, for the public good. In the performance of duty, and in fidelity to my profession, I shall give my utmost.

— "Obligation of an Engineer"

== Ceremony ==
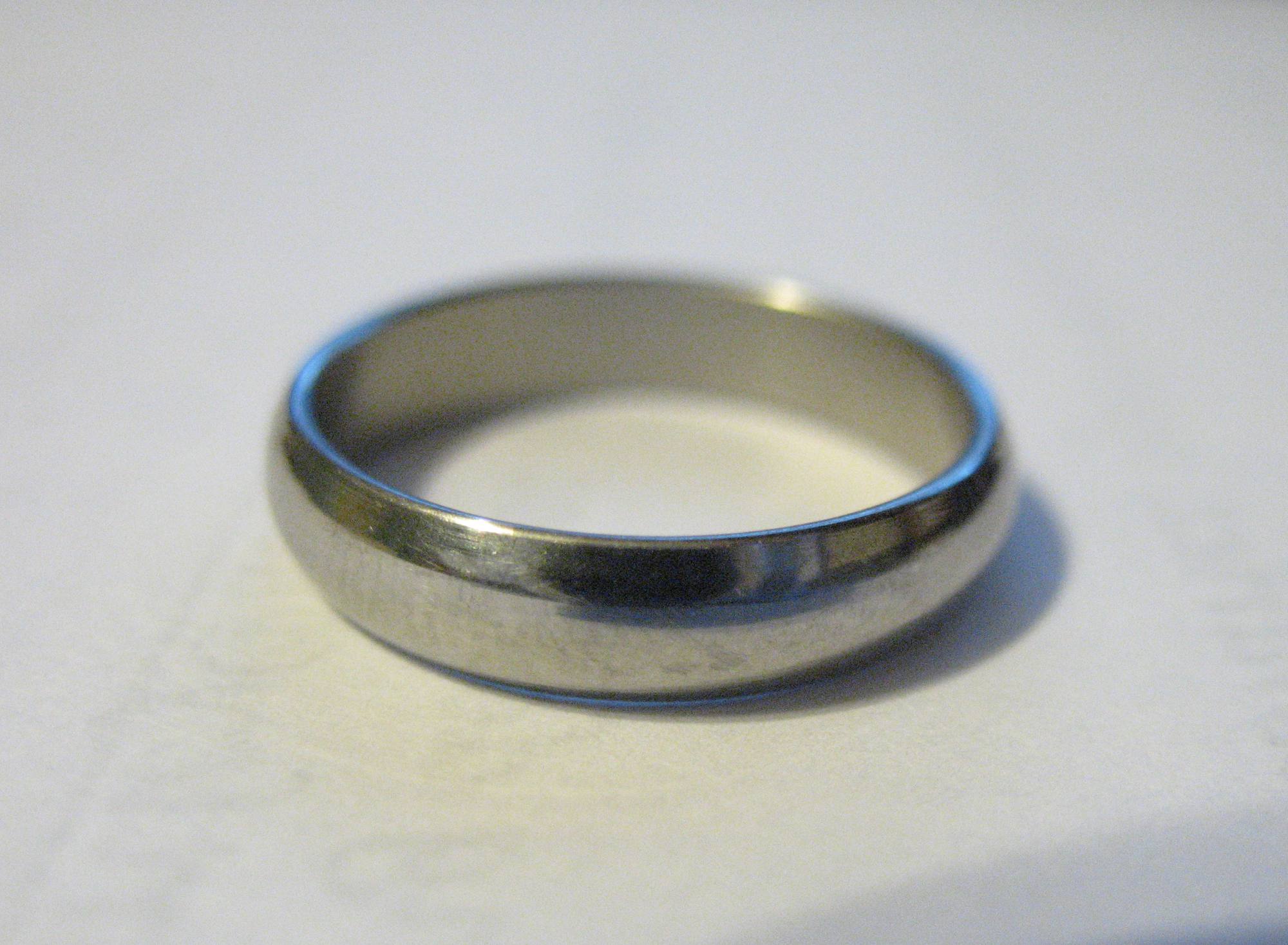
An example of the stainless steel Engineer's Ring issued by the Order of the Engineer

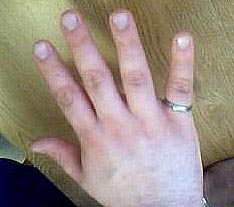
The ring is worn on the little finger of the dominant hand.

During the ceremony, engineering graduates take the Obligation of the Order. After each member takes the obligation, they put their hand through a large representation of the Engineer's Ring. A member of the Order of the Engineer then places a stainless steel ring, known as the Engineer's Ring, onto the little finger of the graduate's dominant hand. The ring is worn on the little finger so that it will drag across any surface on which the wearer writes, providing a constant reminder of the engineer's oath.

Each inductee takes the obligation, signs a certificate of obligation and wears the ring as a symbol of their pride in the Order and their obligation to the profession, as well as the public. Often, friends and family join the new initiates to celebrate after the ceremony.

== History ==
The first American ceremony was held on June 4, 1970 at Cleveland State University's Fenn College of Engineering, though similar ceremonies on which this is based have a much longer history in Canada (dating to 1925). Now, almost all states have universities with chapters, called "links", that host the Order of the Engineer. Several engineering organizations also host links such as NSPE, United States Army Corps of Engineers, and ASCE.

Early attempts to extend the Canadian ritual to the United States were unsuccessful, due to complications including copyright issues.

== See also ==
- Engineer
- Engineering
- Engineering ethics
- Engineer's Ring
- Iron Ring
- National Society of Professional Engineers
- Ordem dos Engenheiros
- Ritual of the Calling of an Engineer
