= Calling of an Engineer =

Statement of professional ethical obligations made by Canadian engineers

- Status: Active
- Genre: Ceremony
- Location: 28 camps throughout Canada
- Country: Canada
- Inaugurated: 25 April 1925; 101 years ago
- Founder: H. E. T. Haultain, Rudyard Kipling (Note: The idea to create a ceremony that emphasized the standards of ethics for graduating engineer originated from Haultain. Kipling authored the obligation that is recited at the ceremony.)
- Participants: Graduates of a Canadian engineering programs, engineers
- Major events: Recital of the Obligation; Conferral of Iron Ring
- Organiser: The Corporation of the Seven Wardens
- Website: ironring.ca

The Calling of an Engineer (French: l'Engagement de l'ingénieur) is a private ceremony, authored by Rudyard Kipling, in which students about to graduate from an engineering program at a university in Canada are permitted to participate. Participation may also be permitted for Canadian professional engineers or have otherwise qualified academically for registration as a professional engineer (such as through technical examinations). The Calling is administered by a body called The Corporation of the Seven Wardens. As part of the ceremony, each participant is conferred the Iron Ring.

== History ==
H. E. T. Haultain first proposed to create a ceremony emphasizing a standard of ethics for engineers.

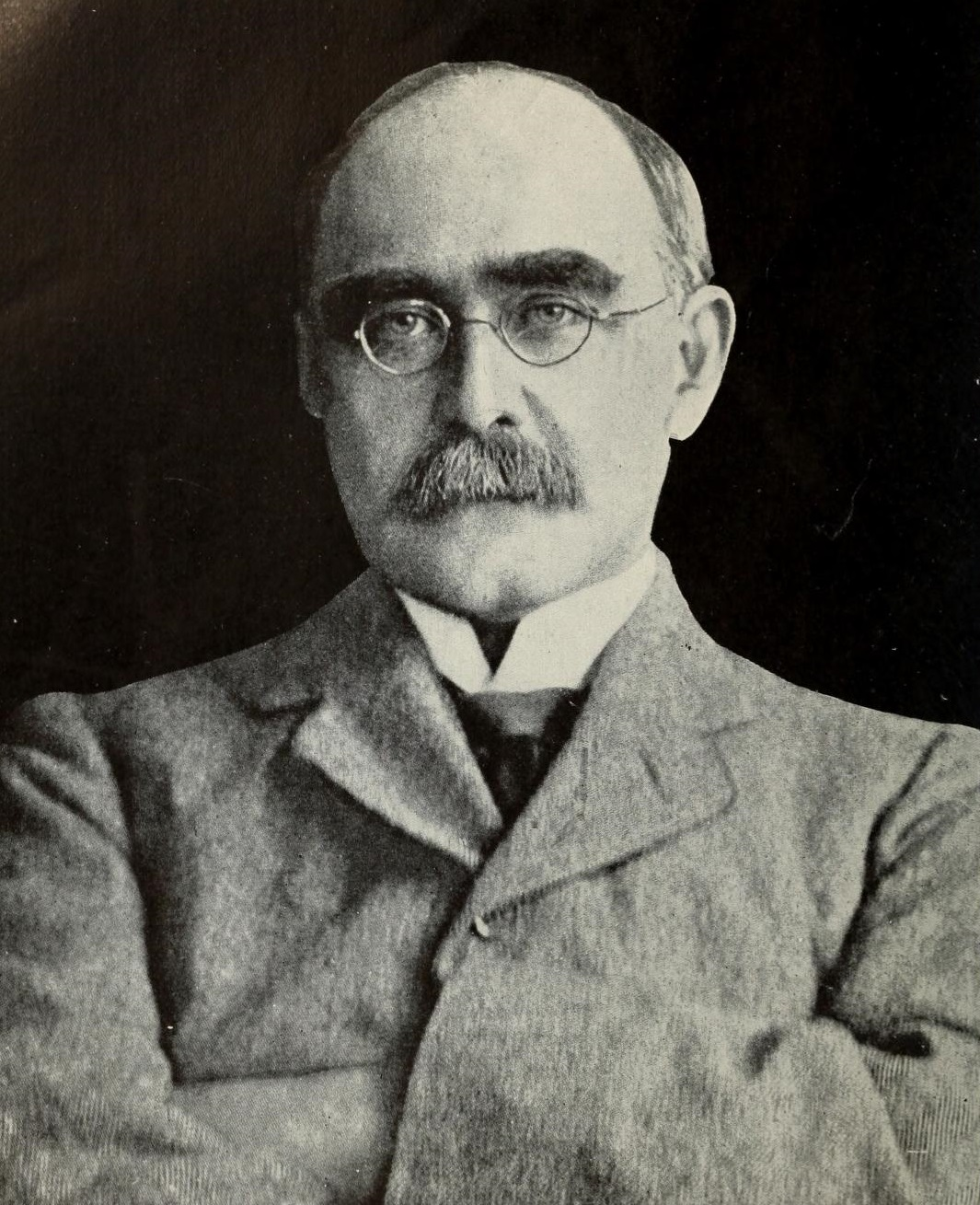
Rudyard Kipling authored the original obligation that was recited at the Ritual of the Calling of an Engineer.

The ceremony, originally a ritual, traces its origins to professor H. E. T. Haultain of the University of Toronto, who believed and persuaded other members of the Engineering Institute of Canada that there needed to be a ceremony and standard of ethics developed for graduating engineers. This was in response to the Quebec Bridge Disaster, in which 75 workmen died due to faulty engineering calculations and miscommunication. The ritual was created in 1922 by Rudyard Kipling at the request of Haultain, representing seven past-presidents of the Engineering Institute of Canada. The seven past presidents were the original seven wardens of the corporation.

The Ritual of the Calling of an Engineer has been instituted with the simple end of directing the young engineer towards a consciousness of his profession and its significance, and indicating to the older engineer his responsibilities in receiving, welcoming and supporting the young engineers in their beginnings.

— Rudyard Kipling, from notes by Dr. J. Jeswiet

An inaugural ceremony was held in the evening of 25 April 1925, at the University Club of Montreal, when the obligation was taken by six engineers, (Note: R.A. Ross, Consulting Engineer, acting as the Senior Supervising Engineer of the ceremony; J.M.R. Fairbairn, Chief Engineer, Canadian Pacific Railway; Harold Rolph, President, John S. Metcalf and Co., Consulting Engineers; N.M. Lash, Chief Engineer, Bell Telephone Co.; J.M. Robertson, Consulting Engineer; and John Chalmers, Engineer for John Quinlan & Co., Contractors.) some of whom were involved with Kipling in its development. On 1 May 1925, three of these newly obligated engineers met at the University of Toronto with a number of the officers of the Engineering Alumni Association and obligated 14 of them in the Senate Chamber of the university becoming the first local chapter (referred to as a camp) to do so. Fairbairn met with Harry F. McLean, president of Dominion Construction and Kipling in Montreal at the Ritz-Carlton Hotel to discuss the details of the ritual. Fairbairn later visited McLean at his home in Merrickville, Ontario, to secure a sizeable donation from McLean, philanthropist, on behalf of the Corporation of the Seven Wardens, the custodian and administrator of the ritual, to ensure its survival.

The Calling and the conferring of the Iron Ring continues to be administered by The Corporation of the Seven Wardens Inc./Société des Sept Gardiens inc. through camps associated with the universities granting degrees in engineering in Canada.

== Ceremony ==
The Calling takes place separately at individual Camps across Canada, usually situated near an engineering university. The ceremonies are separate, organised by one of 28 camps of the Corporation of the Seven Wardens for administrative purposes.

The Obligation, which is not an oath but a solemn expression of intention, is subscribed to at the ceremony. The Obligation essentially states the duties and responsibilities of the engineer. Following the Obligation, the Iron Ring is placed on the little finger of the working hand, and is worn by the engineer as a symbol and a reminder.

Previously, a biblical passage was quoted: 2 Esdras, Chapter 4, Verses 5–10. More generally today, Kipling's poem the Hymn of Breaking Strain is recited.

The Obligation is private, though not necessarily secret. However, it is customary for those who have gone through it to not discuss the details of the Calling with others, even engineers from other countries. The ceremony is open only to candidates, those who have already undergone the Calling, and at some sites, guests invited by candidates.

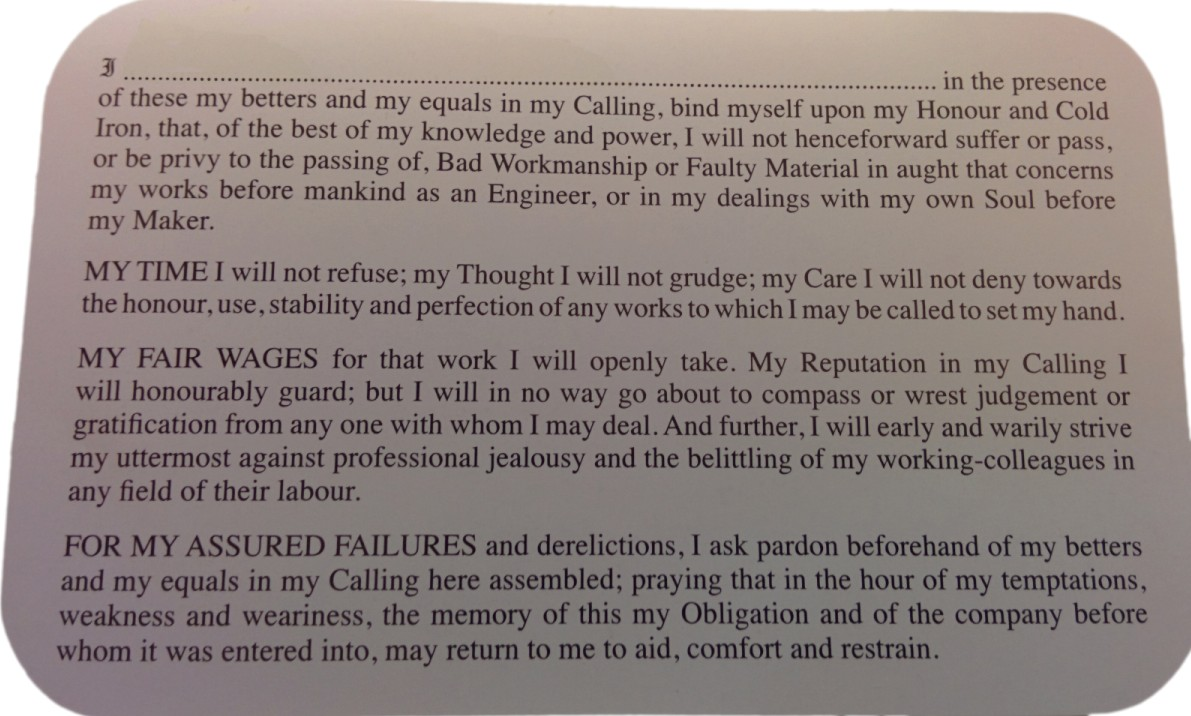
The obligation spoken at the Calling of an Engineer

As part of the preparation for the Calling, candidates are instructed not to discuss the details of the ceremony with the media. A reminder of this is provided at the end of the ceremony in the form of a written instruction that states: "The Rule of Governance provides that there shall be no publicity in connection with the Ritual." Commemorating the 75th anniversary, the Ritual of the Calling of an Engineer domestic-rate stamp was issued on April 25, 2000. Designer Darrell Freeman's "head-to-foot" layout incorporates the symbolic iron ring that is presented as part of the ceremony. The ring also visually links the four engineering achievements featured on this stamp.

The Calling of an Engineer has a very simple purpose: to direct the newly qualified engineer toward a consciousness of the profession and its social significance and indicating to the more experienced engineer their responsibilities in welcoming and supporting the newer engineers when they are ready to enter the profession.

The ring symbolizes the pride which engineers have in their profession, while simultaneously reminding them of their humility. The ring serves as a reminder to the engineer and others of the engineer's obligation to live by a high standard of professional conduct.

== Obligation (modernized version) ==
I, _____ in the presence of these my mentors and my peers in my CALLING, pledge on my HONOUR and COLD IRON, that to the best of my knowledge and power, I will not tolerate or pass, or participate in the passing of, BAD WORKMANSHIP or FAULTY MATERIAL in all that concerns my works as an ENGINEER, or in my dealings with my own conscience, before the WORLD.

My TIME I will offer freely; my THOUGHT I will openly share; my CARE I will fully apply, towards the honour, use, stability and perfection of any works to which I may be called to set my hand.

My fair WAGES for that work I will openly take. My REPUTATION in my CALLING I will honourably guard, but I will not attempt to manipulate, obscure judgement or seek personal gain from anyone with whom I may deal. And further, I will diligently strive against professional jealousy or the belittling of my working colleagues,in any field of their labour.

For my assured failures and derelictions, I ask pardon beforehand of my mentors and my peers in my CALLING here assembled, believing that in the hour of my temptations, weakness and weariness, the memory of this, my OBLIGATION, and of the company before whom it was declared, may return to me to aid, comfort, and restrain.

== Iron Ring ==
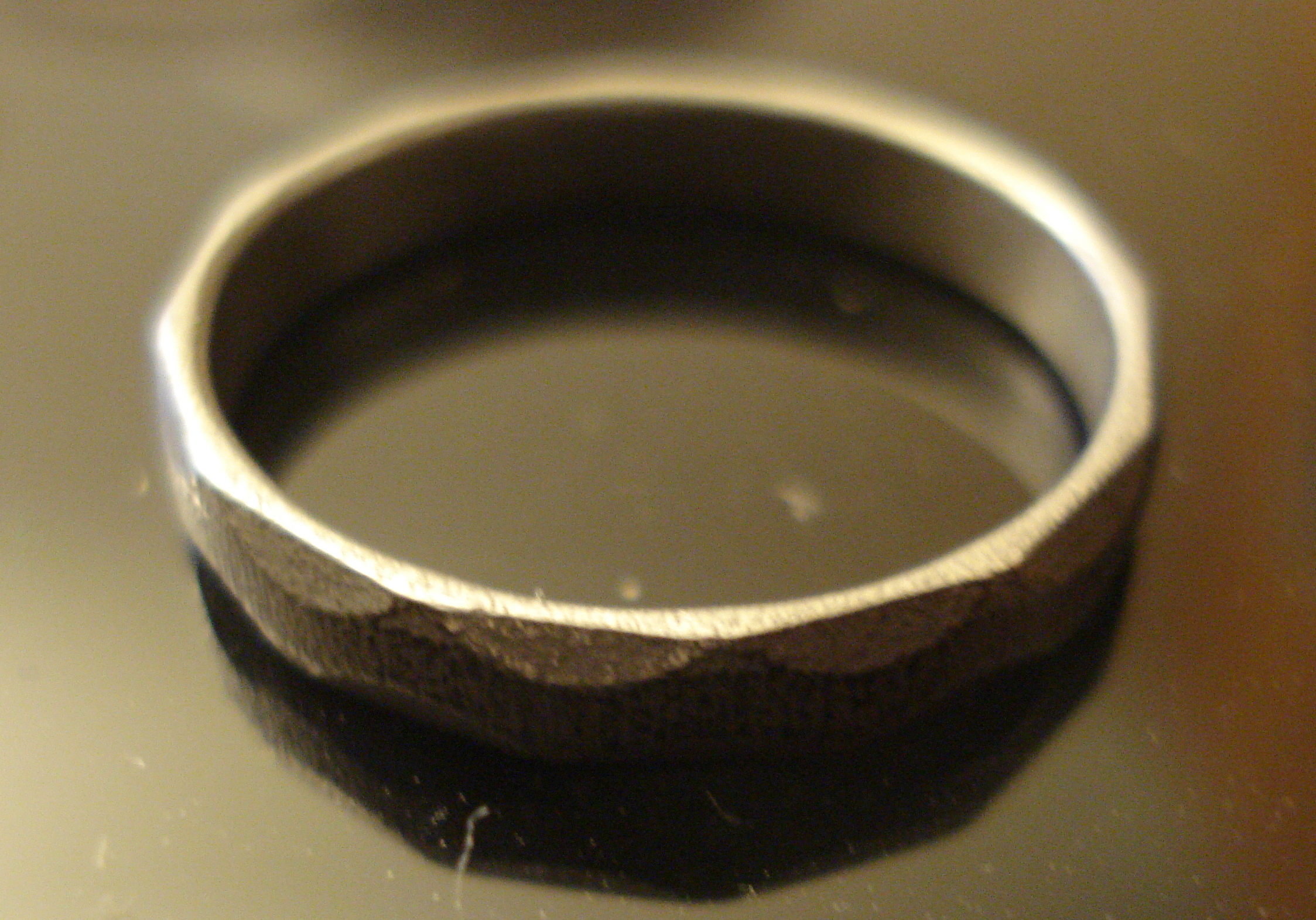
Iron Rings are presented to those who have undergone the Calling.

The Iron Ring may be made from either iron or stainless steel. Presently, only Camp One of the Corporation in Toronto continues to confer rings made from iron; stainless steel rings are conferred at all other locations across Canada. The Iron Ring does not certify a person as a Professional Engineer, which requires registration with a relevant professional organisation followed by examination and practical experience.

== Management ==
The Corporation of the Seven Wardens (French: Société des Sept Gardiens) is the body that holds the rights and the duty to carry out the Calling of an Engineer. It is organised into 28 regional branches, called camps, numbered by order of establishment. The term camp is used to describe these regional branches because it conveys a smaller, close-knit sense of community.

Camp	Associated universities
1. Toronto	University of Toronto; Toronto Metropolitan University; University of Ontario Institute of Technology; York University
2. Montreal	McGill University; Concordia University; Université du Québec en Abitibi-Témiscamingue; Polytechnique Montréal (Université de Montréal); École de technologie supérieure (Université du Québec); Université du Québec à Montréal
3. Kingston	Queen's University; Royal Military College of Canada
4. Saskatoon	University of Saskatchewan
5. Vancouver	University of British Columbia; Simon Fraser University; British Columbia Institute of Technology
6. Edmonton	University of Alberta
7. Halifax	Dalhousie University
8. Winnipeg	University of Manitoba
9. Fredericton	University of New Brunswick
10. Quebec City	Université Laval; Université du Québec à Chicoutimi; Université du Québec à Rimouski
11. London	University of Western Ontario
12. Ottawa	Carleton University; University of Ottawa; Université du Québec en Outaouais
13. Hamilton	McMaster University
14. Windsor	University of Windsor
15. Waterloo	University of Waterloo; Conestoga College
16. Sherbrooke	Université de Sherbrooke
17. Guelph	University of Guelph
18. Calgary	University of Calgary
19. Moncton	Université de Moncton
20. St. John's	Memorial University of Newfoundland
21. Thunder Bay	Lakehead University
22. Sudbury	Laurentian University
23. Victoria	University of Victoria
24. Trois-Rivières	Université du Québec à Trois-Rivières
25. Regina	University of Regina
26. Kelowna	University of British Columbia Okanagan
27. Charlottetown	University of Prince Edward Island
28. Prince George	University of Northern British Columbia

== See also ==
- Engineering traditions in Canada
- Order of the Engineer
