= List of engineering awards =

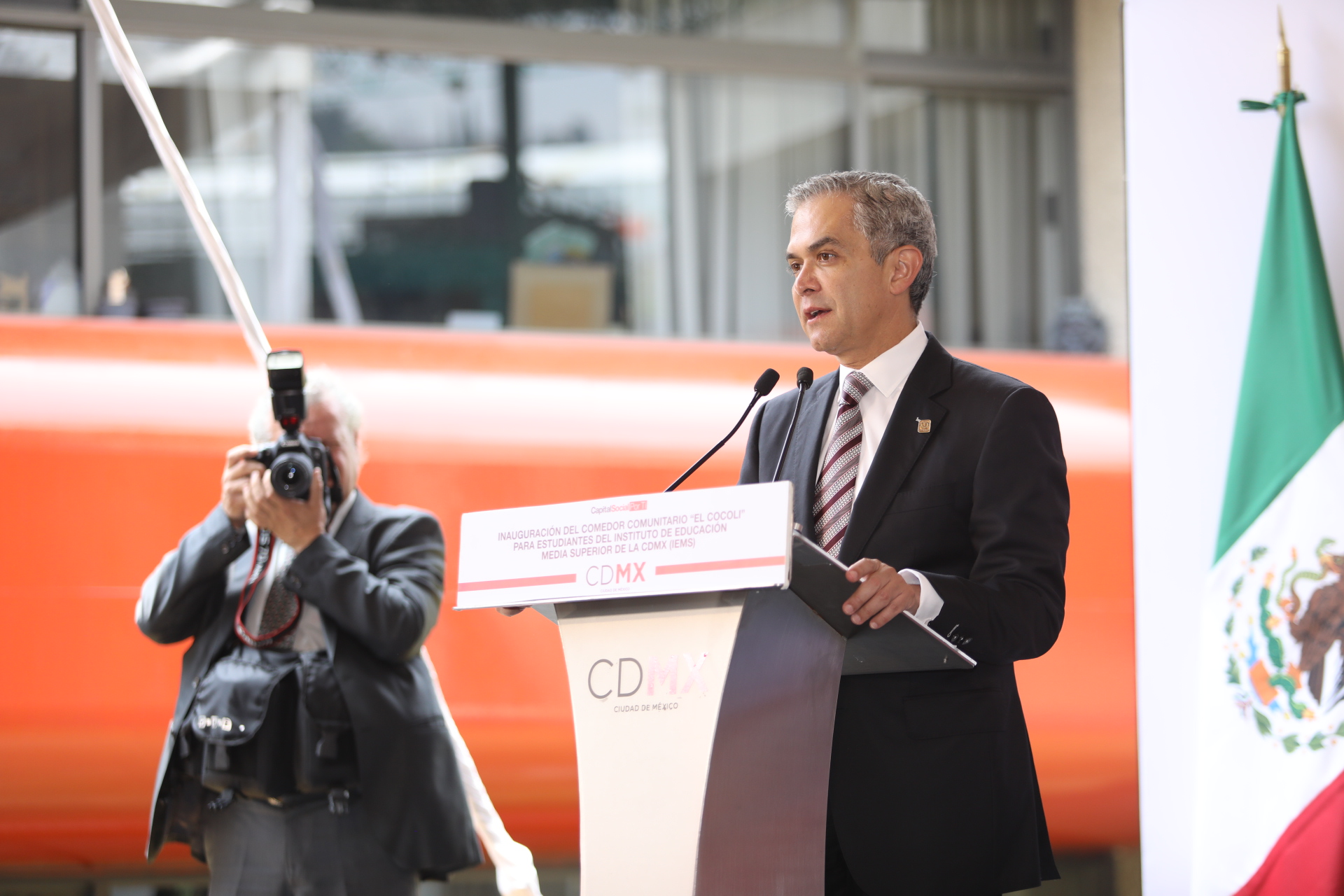
Premio de Ingeniería, Mexico City 2017

This list of engineering awards is an index to articles about notable awards for achievements in engineering. It includes aerospace engineering, chemical engineering, civil engineering, electrical engineering, electronic engineering, structural engineering and systems science awards. It excludes computer-related awards, computer science awards, industrial design awards, mechanical engineering awards, motor vehicle awards, occupational health and safety awards and space technology awards, which are covered by separate lists.

The list is organized by the region and country of the organizations that sponsor the awards, but some awards are not limited to people from that country.

== International ==
Award	Sponsor	Notes
International Award of Merit in Structural Engineering	International Association for Bridge and Structural Engineering	Outstanding contributions in the field of structural engineering, with special reference to usefulness for society
David W. Taylor Medal	Society of Naval Architects and Marine Engineers	Notable achievement in naval architecture and/or marine engineering
Edison Award	Edison Awards	Honoring excellence in innovation
Frank Newman Speller Award	NACE International	Significant contributions to corrosion engineering
INCOSE Pioneer Award	International Council on Systems Engineering	Significant pioneering contributions to the field of systems engineering
Lavoisier Medal (ISBC)	International Society for Biological Calorimetry	Outstanding contribution to the development and/or the application of direct calorimetry in biology and medicine
Luigi G. Napolitano Award	International Astronautical Congress	Young scientist, below 30 years of age, who has contributed significantly to the advancement of the aerospace science
Mondialogo Engineering Award	Daimler AG, UNESCO	Engineering students in developing and developed countries that form international teams to create project proposals that address the Millennium Development Goals
Paul F. Forman Team Engineering Excellence Award	The Optical Society	Technical achievements in optical engineering and contributions to society such as engineering education
UNESCO Niels Bohr Medal	UNESCO	Outstanding contributions to physics through research that has or could have a significant influence on the world
Wright Brothers Medal	SAE International	Notable contributions in the engineering, design, development, or operation of air and space vehicles
Giorgio Quazza Medal	International Federation of Automatic Control	Outstanding lifetime contributions of a researcher and/or engineer to conceptual foundations in the field of systems and control

== Africa ==
Country	Award	Sponsor	Notes
South Africa	Bernard Price Memorial Lecture	South African Institute of Electrical Engineers	Lecture of general scientific or engineering interest

== Americas ==
Country	Award	Sponsor	Notes
Canada	Iron Ring	Ritual of the Calling of an Engineer	Symbol and reminder of the obligations and ethics associated with the engineering profession
Canada	Thomas W. Eadie Medal	Royal Society of Canada	Contributions in engineering and applied science
Chile	National Prize for Applied Sciences and Technologies	National Prize for Sciences	Applied sciences and technologies
United States	Arthur M Wellington prize	American Society of Civil Engineers	Papers on transportation on land, on the water, in the air, or on foundations and closely related subjects
United States	Robert Henry Thurston Lecture Award	American Society of Mechanical Engineers	Oldest named lectureship in mechanical engineering; awarded annually to a leader in pure and/or applied science or engineering to deliver a plenary lecture of broad interest at the ASME International Mechanical Engineering Congress and Exposition (IMECE)
United States	ASME Leonardo Da Vinci Award	American Society of Mechanical Engineers	Design or invention is recognized as an important advance in machine design
United States	ASME Medal	American Society of Mechanical Engineers	Eminently distinguished engineering achievement
United States	ASTM International Award of Merit	ASTM International	Distinguished service and outstanding leadership participation in consensus standards activities sponsored by ASTM International committees
United States	Academy Scientific and Technical Award	Academy of Motion Picture Arts and Sciences	Original developments resulting in significant improvements in motion picture production and exhibition
United States	Alfred Noble Prize	American Society of Civil Engineers	Person not over thirty-five for a technical paper of exceptional merit
United States	Azriel Rosenfeld Award	International Conference on Computer Vision : Institute of Electrical and Electronics Engineers	Outstanding researchers who are recognized as making significant contributions to the field of Computer Vision over longtime careers
United States	Charles Goodyear Medal	American Chemical Society, Rubber Division	Outstanding invention, innovation, or development which has resulted in a significant change or contribution to the nature of the rubber industry
United States	Charles Stark Draper Prize	National Academy of Engineering	Advancement of engineering and education of the public about engineering
United States	Claud A. Jones Award	American Society of Naval Engineers	United States fleet or field engineers who have made significant contributions to improving operational engineering or material readiness of the United States maritime forces
United States	Daniel Guggenheim Medal	American Society of Mechanical Engineers etc.	Notable achievements in the advancement of aeronautics
United States	Dick Volz Award	Georgia Tech	Outstanding Ph.D. thesis in the field of robotics and automation
United States	Donald P. Eckman Award	American Automatic Control Council	Outstanding achievements by a young researcher under the age of 35 in the field of control theory
United States	Curtis W. McGraw Research Award	American Society for Engineering Education	Significant achievements by young researchers and educators under the age of 40 emphasizing outstanding achievement, trajectory, and potential in all fields of engineering
United States	Drucker Medal	American Society of Mechanical Engineers	Distinguished contributions to the fields of applied mechanics and mechanical engineering
United States	Elliott Cresson Medal	Franklin Institute	For some discovery in the Arts and Sciences, or for the invention or improvement of some useful machine, or for some new process or combination of materials in manufactures, or for ingenuity skill or perfection in workmanship (no longer awarded)
United States	Elmer A. Sperry Award	American Institute of Aeronautics and Astronautics, American Society of Mechanical Engineers etc.	Distinguished engineering contribution which, through application, proved in actual service, has advanced the art of transportation whether by land, sea, air, or space
United States	Engineer's Ring	Order of the Engineer	Certified Professional Engineer or graduate from an accredited engineering program
United States	Enrico Fermi Award	United States Department of Energy	Lifetime achievement in the development, use, or production of energy
United States	Eringen Medal	Society of Engineering Science	Sustained outstanding achievements in Engineering Science
United States	Federal Engineer of the Year Award	National Society of Professional Engineers	Federal government engineer: technical excellence, publications, leadership, and community service
United States	Frank P. Brown Medal	Franklin Institute	Excellence in science, engineering, and structures (no longer awarded)
United States	Benjamin Franklin Medal in Mechanical Engineering	Franklin Institute	Excellence in Engineering
United States	George M. Low award	NASA	NASA subcontractors in recognition of quality and performance
United States	George Westinghouse Award (ASEE)	American Society for Engineering Education	Outstanding contributions to engineering education
United States	Gibbs Brothers Medal	National Academy of Sciences	Outstanding contributions in the field of naval architecture and marine engineering
United States	Goethals Medal	Society of American Military Engineers	Eminent and notable contributions in engineering, design, or construction
United States	Gordon Prize	National Academy of Engineering	Development of new educational approaches to engineering
United States	Harold Brown Award	United States Air Force	Scientist or engineer who applies scientific research to solve a problem critical to the needs of the Air Force
United States	Harold Pender Award	University of Pennsylvania School of Engineering and Applied Science	Outstanding member of the engineering profession who has achieved distinction by significant contributions to society
United States	Harry C. Bigglestone Award	National Fire Protection Association, Fire Technology	Excellence in the communication of fire protection concepts
United States	Honorary Member (ASME)	American Society of Mechanical Engineers	Highest level of membership in ASME. For distinguished service that contributes significantly to the attainment of the goals of the engineering profession. First awarded in 1880. The ASME Medal ranks closely with honorary membership.
United States	Hoover Medal	American Society of Mechanical Engineers etc.	Outstanding extra-career services by engineers to humanity
United States	IEEE David Sarnoff Award	Institute of Electrical and Electronics Engineers	Exceptional contributions to electronics
United States	IEEE Edison Medal	Institute of Electrical and Electronics Engineers	A gold medal for achievement in electrical science, engineering, or arts
United States	IEEE Eric E. Sumner award	Institute of Electrical and Electronics Engineers	Outstanding contributions to communications technology
United States	IEEE Fourier Award	Institute of Electrical and Electronics Engineers	Contributions in the field of signal processing
United States	IEEE Medal of Honor	Institute of Electrical and Electronics Engineers	Exceptional contribution or an extraordinary career in the IEEE fields of interest
United States	IEEE Nikola Tesla Award	Institute of Electrical and Electronics Engineers	Outstanding contribution to the generation or utilization of electric power
United States	IEEE Simon Ramo Medal	Institute of Electrical and Electronics Engineers	Exceptional achievement in systems engineering and systems science
United States	Igor I. Sikorsky Human Powered Helicopter Competition	Vertical Flight Society	Human-powered helicopter
United States	Intel Outstanding Researcher Award	Intel	Outstanding contributions to the development of advanced nanoelectronic and manufacturing technologies
United States	Joan Hodges Queneau Medal	National Audubon Society, American Association of Engineering Societies	Outstanding contribution by an engineer in behalf of environmental conservation
United States	John Fritz Medal	American Association of Engineering Societies	Outstanding scientific or industrial achievements
United States	John Price Wetherill Medal	Franklin Institute	Discovery or invention in the physical sciences, or new and important combinations of principles or methods already known (no longer awarded)
United States	John R. Ragazzini Award	American Automatic Control Council	Outstanding contributions to automatic control education
United States	John Tyndall Award	IEEE Photonics Society, The Optical Society	Pioneering, highly significant, or continuing technical or leadership contributions to fiber optics technology
United States	John von Neumann Theory Prize	Institute for Operations Research and the Management Sciences	Fundamental and sustained contributions to theory in operations research and the management sciences
United States	LTPP Data Analysis Contest	American Society of Civil Engineers	Use of the LTPP database for generating knowledge about the behaviour of pavements and roads
United States	Lavoisier Medal (Dupont)	DuPont	Scientists and engineers who have made outstanding contributions to DuPont and their scientific fields throughout their careers
United States	Lemelson–MIT Prize	Lemelson Foundation	Inventors who have ... had a significant impact in the areas of health, technology, energy, manufacturing, research and other sectors
United States	Marconi Prize	Marconi Society	Achievements and advancements made in field of communications (radio, mobile, wireless, telecommunications, data communications, networks, and Internet)
United States	Marie Pistilli Award	Design Automation Conference	Outstanding achievements of women in electronic design automation
United States	Max Jakob Memorial Award	American Institute of Chemical Engineers	Eminent scholarly achievement and distinguished leadership in the field of heat transfer
United States	NAS Award in Aeronautical Engineering	National Academy of Sciences	Excellence in the field of aeronautical engineering
United States	Nathan M. Newmark Medal	American Society of Civil Engineers	Outstanding contributions in structural engineering and mechanics
United States	Norman Medal	American Society of Civil Engineers	Technical paper that "makes a definitive contribution to engineering science"
United States	Percy Nicholls Award	American Institute of Mining, Metallurgical, and Petroleum Engineers, American Society of Mechanical Engineers	Notable scientific or industrial achievement in the field of solid fuels
United States	Phil Kaufman Award	Electronic System Design Alliance	Individuals for their impact on electronic design by their contributions to electronic design automation
United States	PICMET Medal of Excellence	Portland International Center for Management of Engineering and Technology	Extraordinary achievements of individuals in any discipline for their outstanding contributions to science, engineering and technology management
United States	Pioneer Award (Aviation)	IEEE Aerospace and Electronic Systems Society	Significant contributions of interest to the IEEE Aerospace and Electronic Systems Society
United States	Primetime Engineering Emmy Award	Academy of Television Arts & Sciences	Outstanding engineering developments so significant an improvement on existing methods or so innovative in nature that they materially affect the transmission, recording or reception of television.
United States	Raymond D. Mindlin Medal	American Society of Civil Engineers	For outstanding research in applied solid mechanics
United States	Richard E. Bellman Control Heritage Award	American Automatic Control Council	Achievements in control theory
United States	Rufus Oldenburger Medal	American Society of Mechanical Engineers	Significant contributions and outstanding achievements in the field of automatic control
United States	Russ Prize	National Academy of Engineering	Bioengineering achievement that "has had a significant impact on society and has contributed to the advancement of the human condition through widespread use"
United States	SPIE Gold Medal	SPIE (Society of Photo-Optical Instrumentation Engineers)	Photonic and optical engineering and related instrumental sciences
United States	Sharon Keillor Award for Women in Engineering Education	American Society for Engineering Education	Outstanding women engineering educators
United States	Steel bridge competition	American Society of Civil Engineers	Contest that tests the knowledge and practicality of teams of university students in the field of structural engineering
United States	Stuhlinger Medal	International Electric Propulsion Conference : Electric Rocket Propulsion Society	Outstanding contributions to the science, technology or development of electric propulsion
United States	TEC Awards	TEC Foundation for Excellence in Audio, NAMM Show	Technically innovative products as well as companies and individuals who have excelled in sound for television, film, recordings, and concerts
United States	Technology & Engineering Emmy Award	National Academy of Television Arts and Sciences	Outstanding achievement in technical or engineering development
United States	Theodore von Karman Medal	American Society of Civil Engineers	Distinguished achievement in engineering mechanics, applicable to any branch of civil engineering
United States	Thomas Fitch Rowland Prize	American Society of Civil Engineers	Print article in an ASCE journal
United States	Timoshenko Medal	American Society of Mechanical Engineers	Distinguished contributions to the field of applied mechanics
United States	Victor A. Prather Award	American Astronautical Society	"Researchers, engineers and flight crew members in the field of extravehicular protection or activity in space."
United States	Walter L. Huber Civil Engineering Research Prize	American Society of Civil Engineers	Notable achievements in research related to all areas of civil engineering
United States	Washington Award	American Institute of Mining, Metallurgical, and Petroleum Engineers etc.	Engineering accomplishments which promote the happiness, comfort, and well-being of humanity
United States	William Lawrence Saunders Gold Medal	American Institute of Mining, Metallurgical, and Petroleum Engineers	Distinguished achievement in mining other than coal
United States	Worcester Reed Warner Medal	American Society of Mechanical Engineers	For seminal contribution to the permanent literature of mechanical engineering

== Asia ==
Country	Award	Sponsor	Notes
India	Shanti Swarup Bhatnagar Prize for Science and Technology	Council of Scientific and Industrial ResearchGovernment of India	It is a science award in India given annually by the Council of Scientific and Industrial Research (CSIR) for notable and outstanding research, applied or fundamental, in biology, chemistry, environmental science, engineering, mathematics, medicine and Physics. The prize recognizes outstanding Indian work (according to the view of CSIR awarding committee) in science and technology. It is the most coveted award in multidisciplinary science in India. The award is named after the founder Director of the Council of Scientific & Industrial Research, Shanti Swarup Bhatnagar.
India	Aryabhata Award	Astronautical Society of India	Notable lifetime contributions in the field of astronautics and aerospace technology in India
India	Infosys Prize in Engineering and Computer Science	Infosys Science Foundation	Awards outstanding achievements of contemporary researchers and scientists across six categories, including Engineering and Computer Science
India	Om Prakash Bhasin Award	Om Prakash Bhasin Foundation	Excellence in the areas of science and technology
Iran	Khwarizmi International Award	Iranian Research Organization for Science and Technology	Individuals who have made outstanding achievements in research, innovation and invention, in fields related to science and technology
Malaysia	Malaysia Most Prominent Engineering Leader Award	Board of Engineers Malaysia (BEM)	Engineering excellence to a Malaysian whose continuous contribution to engineering over many years is of sufficient magnitude, significance and prominence to merit the BEM premier award
South Korea	Ho-Am Prize in Engineering	Samsung	Individuals of Korean heritage who have furthered the welfare of humanity through distinguished accomplishments in the field of Engineering

== Europe ==
Country	Award	Sponsor	Notes
Denmark	Niels Bohr International Gold Medal	Danish Society of Engineers, Niels Bohr Institute and Royal Danish Academy of Sciences	Outstanding work by an engineer or physicist for the peaceful utilization of atomic energy
Europe	Schwäbisch Gmünd Prize	European Academy of Surface Technology (EAST)	Early career researcher active in Europe on the grounds of originality, creativity and excellence in surface technology
Finland	Millennium Technology Prize	Technology Academy Finland	Life-enhancing technological innovation
France	Médaille Lavoisier	Société chimique de France	Work or actions which have enhanced the perceived value of chemistry in society
Germany	Berthold Leibinger Innovationspreis	Berthold Leibinger Stiftung	Applied laser technology and innovations on the application or generation of laser light
Germany	Ludwig Prandtl Ring	Deutsche Gesellschaft für Luft- und Raumfahrt	Outstanding contribution in the field of aerospace engineering
Germany	Eduard Rhein Prize	Eduard Rhein Foundation	Outstanding contribution in the field electronics
Germany	Otto Hahn Prize	German Chemical Society, German Physical Society, City of Frankfurt	Outstanding achievement in the field of chemistry, physics or applied engineering science
Germany	Werner von Siemens Ring	Stiftung Werner-von-Siemens-Ring	People who have promoted the technical sciences through their achievements or, as representatives of science, have opened up new paths through their research into technology
Greece	The Hellenic Society for Systemic Studies Award	Hellenic Society for Systemic Studies	Individuals who have contributed significantly to the further development of systemic and complex sciences and their applications towards solving real-life problems
Greece	The Hellenic Society for Systemic Studies Medal	Hellenic Society for Systemic Studies	Senior scientists whose work in systems and complex sciences has been extremely influential worldwide
Hungary	International Dennis Gabor Award	NOVOFER Foundation	Outstanding scientific achievements with practical applications, with a clear positive attitude towards international cooperation of the researchers
Italy	Pirelli Internetional Award	Pirelli Corporation	Communication of science and technology conducted entirely on the internet (award suspended)
Italy	Marconi Prize	Marconi Society	recognizing the work done by scientists who have distinguished themselves in the development of applications in the field of telecommunications intended for the advancement of mankind
Italy	Marconi Junior Prize	Guglielmo Marconi Foundation	Awarded to graduating students for a thesis project relevant to the ICT field (since 2004, last awarded in 2012)
Netherlands	Kamerlingh Onnes Award	Royal Dutch Association of Refrigeration	Scientists active in the field of refrigeration technology, cryogenics and more generally low-temperature science and technology
Norway	Betongtavlen	Association of Norwegian Architects	A structure "where concrete is used in an environmentally, esthetically and technically excellent way"
Sweden	Nitro Nobel Gold Medal	Dyno Nobel	Outstanding contributions to the field of explosives
Switzerland / World	Anton Tedesko Medal	International Association for Bridge and Structural Engineering	Distinguished young structural engineer as recognition of his/her life achievements
United Kingdom	IET Achievement Medal	Institution of Engineering and Technology	Significant contribution to various fields in engineering
United Kingdom	Beilby Medal and Prize	Institute of Materials, Minerals and Mining, Royal Society of Chemistry, Society of Chemical Industry	Work that has exceptional practical significance in chemical engineering, applied materials science, energy efficiency or a related field
United Kingdom	Bessemer Gold Medal	Institute of Materials, Minerals and Mining	Outstanding services to the steel industry
United Kingdom	British Construction Industry Awards	Institution of Civil Engineers	Outstanding achievement in the construction of buildings, taking account architectural and engineering design, construction process, delivery to time and budget, and client satisfaction
United Kingdom	Castner Medal	Society of Chemical Industry	Authority on applied electrochemistry or electrochemical engineering connected to industrial research
United Kingdom	Clifford Paterson Lecture	Royal Society	Prize lecture on an engineering topic
United Kingdom	Engineering Leadership Award	Royal Academy of Engineering	Britain's future engineering leaders
United Kingdom	George E. Davis Medal	Institution of Chemical Engineers	Achievements in chemical engineering
United Kingdom	Gold Medal of the Institution of Structural Engineers	Institution of Structural Engineers	Exceptional and outstanding contributions to the advancement of structural engineering
United Kingdom	IET A F Harvey Prize	Institution of Engineering and Technology	Innovative engineering researcher
United Kingdom	IET Faraday Medal	Institution of Engineering and Technology	For notable scientific or industrial achievement in engineering or for conspicuous service rendered to the advancement of science, engineering and technology
United Kingdom	IET Mountbatten Medal	Institution of Engineering and Technology	Significant contribution to various fields in engineering
United Kingdom	International Medal	Royal Academy of Engineering	Non-UK citizens or residents who made exceptional contributions to engineering
United Kingdom	James Alfred Ewing Medal	Institution of Civil Engineers	Special meritorious contributions to the science of engineering in the field of research
United Kingdom	Kelvin Gold Medal	Institution of Civil Engineers	Distinction in engineering work or investigation
United Kingdom	Kremer prize	Human Powered Flight Group	Pioneers of human-powered flight
United Kingdom	Longitude rewards	British government	Precise determination of a ship's longitude (no longer awarded)
United Kingdom	MacRobert Award	Royal Academy of Engineering	Innovation in engineering by UK corporations
United Kingdom	Progress Medal	Royal Photographic Society	In recognition of any invention, research, publication or other contribution which has resulted in an important advance in the scientific or technological development of photography or imaging in the widest sense
United Kingdom	President's Medal	Royal Academy of Engineering	Fellow of the Academy who has contributed significantly to the Academy's aims and work through their initiative in promoting excellence in engineering
United Kingdom	Prince Philip Medal	Royal Academy of Engineering	Exceptional contribution to engineering as a whole through practice, management or education
United Kingdom	Queen Elizabeth Prize for Engineering	Queen Elizabeth Prize for Engineering Foundation, Royal Academy of Engineering	Ground-breaking innovation in engineering which has been of global benefit to humanity
United Kingdom	Saltire Prize	Scottish Government's Energy and Climate Change Directorate	Advances in the commercial development of marine energy
United Kingdom	Sir Frank Whittle Medal	Royal Academy of Engineering	Engineer, normally resident in the United Kingdom, for outstanding and sustained achievement which has contributed to the well-being of the nation
United Kingdom	Structural Awards	Institution of Structural Engineers	Outstanding structure which demonstrates excellent coordination of all aspects of the engineering elements and services combined with elegance, life-time economy and respect for the environment in which the structure is built
United Kingdom	Sugden Award	The Combustion Institute (British Section)	Published paper with at least one British Section member as author, which makes the most significant contribution to combustion research
United Kingdom	Telford Medal	Institution of Civil Engineers	Drawings, models, diagrams or essays relating to civil engineering or any other new equipment of invention relating to engineering or surveying in general, which is regarded as most seminal and influential
United Kingdom	Young Woman Engineer of the Year Award	Institution of Engineering and Technology	Young female engineering apprentices in the UK

== Oceania ==
Country	Award	Sponsor	Notes
Australia	Australian Engineering Heritage Register	Engineers Australia	Records the history of significant engineering works and places markers and interpretative panels at heritage sites
Australia	Barry Inglis Medal	National Measurement Institute, Australia	Leadership, research and/or applications of measurement techniques
Australia	David Dewhurst Medal	Engineers Australia	Bronze medal for biomedical engineering
Australia	M. A. Sargent Medal	Engineers Australia	Longstanding eminence in science or the practice of electrical engineering
Australia	Norman W. V. Hayes Medal	Institution of Radio and Electronics Engineers	Most meritorious paper published in the Proceedings of the Institution of Radio and Electronics Engineers Australia (no longer awarded)
Australia	Peter Nicol Russell Memorial Medal	Engineers Australia	Notable contribution to the science and/or practice of engineering in Australia

== See also ==
- List of computer science awards
- List of computer-related awards
- List of mechanical engineering awards
- List of motor vehicle awards
- List of space technology awards
- Lists of awards
- Lists of science and technology awards
