= Queneau =

Queneau may refer to:

== People ==
- Jean-Robert Quéneau (1758–1792), Holy September Martyr during the French Revolution
- Paul E. Queneau (1911–2012), American professor
- Raymond Queneau (1903–1976), French writer

== Other uses ==
- Site of Queneau: area of special value, a protected heritage site in Flobecq, Belgium
- Joan Hodges Queneau Medal, an American engineering award for the field of environmental conservation
