= Hamburg Central Bus Station =

Bus station in Hamburg, Germany

Hamburg Central Bus Station Zentraler Omnibusbahnhof
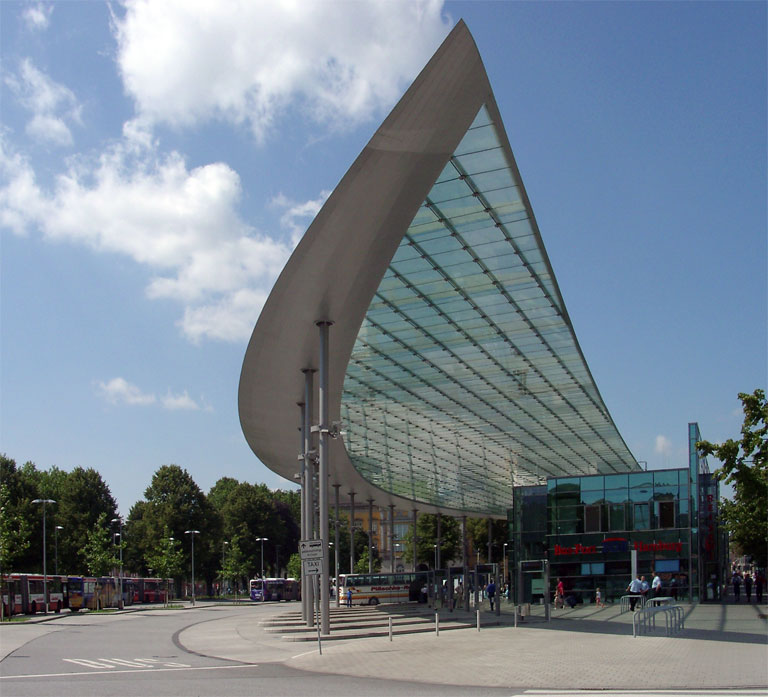

General information
- Location: St. Georg; Germany
- Coordinates: 53°33′07″N 10°00′41.3″E
- System: Public transport bus service
- Operator: ZOB Hamburg GmbH
- Bus stands: 14
- Bus operators: Flixbus; Polenreisen; Touring; EST; Becker Reisen; Reisering HH; Sindbad Reisen; Atlassib; Peters Reisen; Becker Reisen

Construction
- Structure type: building, covered pavilion
- Architect: ASW Architekten Silcher, Werner und Redante

History
- Opened: 1950
- Rebuilt: 24 May 2003
Location

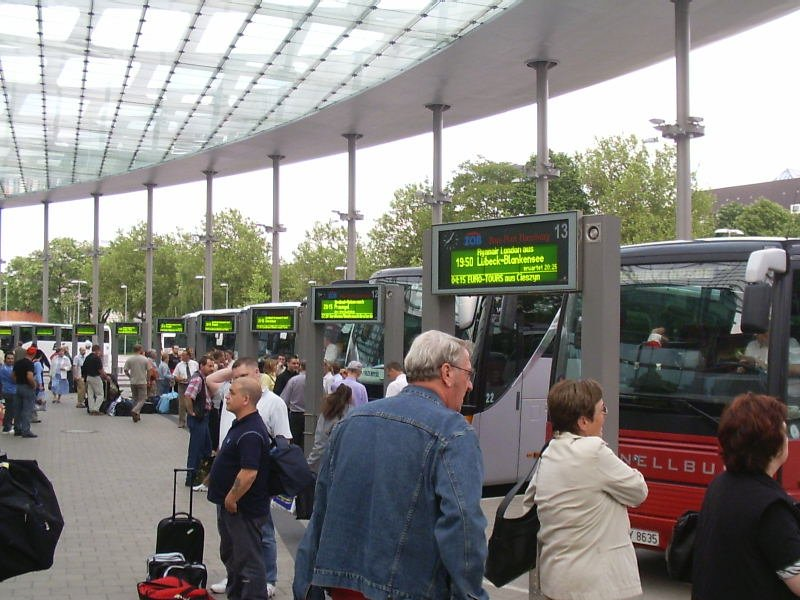

The Hamburg Central Bus Station (abbreviated ZOB, for Zentraler Omnibusbahnhof in German) is the central station for long-distance coaches in and out of Hamburg. It is located southeast of the Central Railway Station Hamburg Hauptbahnhof at the St. Georg district.

The recent building, which replaced the first building from 1950, was designed by the architects ASW Architekten Silcher, Werner und Redante from Hamburg and engineering firm Schlaich Bergermann & Partner from Stuttgart.

In 2006, the structure received the Outstanding Structure Award from the IABSE. The IABSE described it as a "delightful canopy over a bus station with soaring, transparent cantilevers designed to perfection enhancing the urban infrastructure."
