= Paul Grundy (engineer) =

- Born: 12 May 1935; Melbourne, Australia
- Died: 6 January 2013 (aged 77); Melbourne, Australia
- Citizenship: Australia
- Education: University of Melbourne, Melbourne, Victoria
- Engineering career
- Discipline: engineer
- Institutions: University of Melbourne Emeritus Member of the College of Structural Engineers
- Awards: W R Chapman Medal; John Connell Gold Medal; Order of Australia; Anton Tedesko Medal

Paul Grundy (12 May 1935 – 6 January 2013) was an Australian engineer, who worked in the fields of structural and civil engineering, and was a long-standing lecturer and professor emeritus in the Department of Civil Engineering at Monash University.

== Education, qualifications and career ==
Paul Grundy began studying engineering at the University of Melbourne in 1953 following his father, who was also an engineer. He graduated as Bachelor of Civil Engineering in 1957, before undertaking a Master of Engineering Science in 1960 also at Melbourne. He then completed a PhD at the University of Cambridge in 1961. He worked for a short time in the industry, taking up positions at Civil & Civic Pty Ltd and Hardcastle & Richards Pty Ltd, Consulting Engineer. In January 1966 he joined the Department of Civil Engineering at Monash University where he was variously lecturer, 1966–1968; Senior Lecturer, 1969–1976; Associate Professor, 1977–1993; Head, Department of Civil Engineering, 1996–1998; and Professor, Chair of Structural Engineering, Monash University, 1994–2000; a position he held until retirement in December 2000.

His research focussed on many problems in engineering with a persistent interest in the lifetime performance of structures in hostile environments under dynamic and repeated loading ... [including] research into load spectrums, fatigue and fracture, incremental collapse, risk assessment and life extension applied to cranes, bridges, ships (bulk carriers) and offshore structures with wrought iron, steel, concrete, composite and FRP materials. He was engaged on many occasions to advise on the West Gate Bridge from after the tragic collapse in 1970 to the upgrade in 2010–12.

In his work at Monash he helped to launch the Off-shore Engineering Program and established the national group ACADS (the Association for Computer Aided Design) in 1972 to help professionals develop computing skills and set standards for software in engineering applications.

He was also involved in development of a software package BRAWIM for detailed modelling of load effects on highway bridges derived from weigh-in-motion data, which was used to assist in establishing fatigue loading rules for the Austroads Bridge Design Code AS5100.

When the Menangle railway bridge was closed due to structural concerns, amidst a heated political debate and election campaign, Grundy undertook a structural analysis which proved the bridge to be sound.

== Professional associations and awards ==
Grundy was twice awarded the W R Chapman Medal. (1986 and 1994)

He was an Emeritus Member of the College of Structural Engineers, Australia, Honorary Associate of the International Association for Bridge and Structural Engineering (IABSE) and a Life Member of Clare Hall, Cambridge. In 2008 he was made a Member of the Order of Australia for services to engineering. He was awarded the 2010 John Connell Gold Medal from Engineers Australia at the 5th International Civil Engineering Conference for the Asian Region, and the 2012 Anton Tedesko Medal from the International Association for Bridge and Structural Engineering (IABSE). He was a member of its Working Commission 7 on Sustainability, and a member of the National Trust (Victoria) Industrial Heritage Committee on Bridges.

Other positions included:

- Chairman, International Association of Bridge and Structural Engineers (IABSE), Australian Group, since 1999;
- IABSE (international) Outstanding Paper Award Committee, 2006,
- Outstanding Structure Award Committee, 2001–2007;
- Working Commission on Sustainability; Honorary Member, 2006.
- President's Task Force on Sustainability, Engineers Australia, 2004;
- Structural College and Risk Engineering Group;
- Emeritus Member, College of Structural Engineers, 2003.
- Chairman, Joint Working Commission, Disaster Reduction on the Coasts of the Indian Ocean, 2005–2007 (following the 2004 Boxing Day tsunami); resulting in A Guide for Disaster Reduction on the Coasts of the Indian Ocean.
- Technical Committee, International Society of Off-shore and Polar Engineers, 1993–2003.

== Retirement career ==
Following retirement, Grundy used his reputation and technical knowledge to assist with and to disseminate information about disaster mitigation and relief in developing countries. This initiative was prompted by the disastrous Indian Ocean earthquake and tsunami of 26 December 2004 after which he helped form the 'Joint Working Commission for Disaster Reduction on Coasts' at the IABSE Conference New Delhi in February 2005, to develop and implement a Guide for Disaster Reduction on the Coasts of the Indian Ocean, now expanded to encompass disasters globally.

In late 2012 Grundy was diagnosed with a brain tumor which proved to be inoperable. He died on 6 January 2013. His funeral service was held at St Thomas the Apostle Church, Blackburn and he was buried at Lilydale Memorial Park on Friday 11 January 2013.

== Select published works ==
- Grundy, Paul. Criteria for evaluating fatigue life of railway bridges, Monash University, Dept. of Civil Engineering, Civil engineering research reports; 1980 no. 2. ISBN 0867460423
- Grundy, Paul. Designing for Disaster Risk Reduction, In: 5th Civil Engineering Conference in the Asian Region and Australasian Structural Engineering Conference 2010, The. Sydney, N.S.W.: Engineers Australia, 2010:1282-1287. ISBN 9780646537276. cited 11 January 2013.
- Grundy, Paul. Structural Reassessment of Wrought Iron Bridges, Australian Structural Engineering Conference (2005 : Newcastle, N.S.W.) In: Stewart, Mark G (Editor); Dockrill, Brad (Editor). Australian Structural Engineering Conference 2005. Sydney, N.S.W.: Engineers Australia, 2005:770-785.
