= Donald Van Norman Roberts =

American engineer

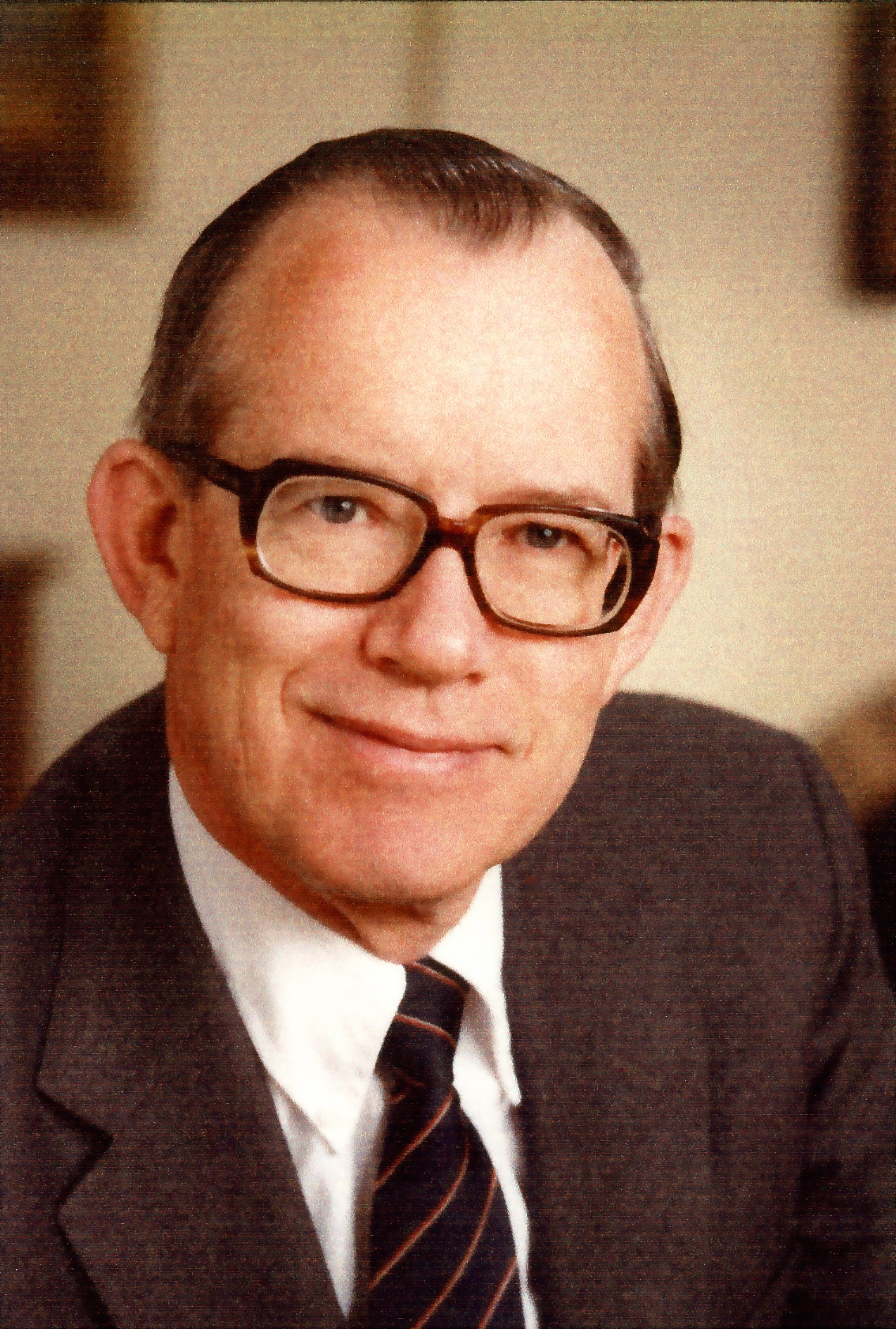
- c. 1985
- Born: June 13, 1928; Fresno, California, United States
- Died: January 31, 2016 (aged 87); Highlands Ranch, Colorado, US
- Occupation(s): Geotechnical and environmental engineer, humanitarian
- Spouse: Charleen Doty (m. 1951)
- Children: Jean Leston, Alice Lynn, Alan Emery, James Frederick

Donald Van Norman Roberts (June 13, 1928 – January 31, 2016) was a civil, geotechnical and environmental engineer from the United States, and advocate for sustainability developments in engineering.

== Early life ==
In 1946, he was accepted to Stanford University, where he majored in civil engineering. Having completed his Stanford undergraduate degree in 1950, he attended a civil engineering and geology graduate program at the Imperial College of the University of London, England. At the Royal School of Mines, he completed courses in engineering geology and advanced courses in stratigraphy and mineralogy.

On April 9, 1951, Roberts married Charleen Doty in Dawlish, South Devon England. They had four children: Jean Leston, Alice Lynn, Alan Emery, and James Frederick.

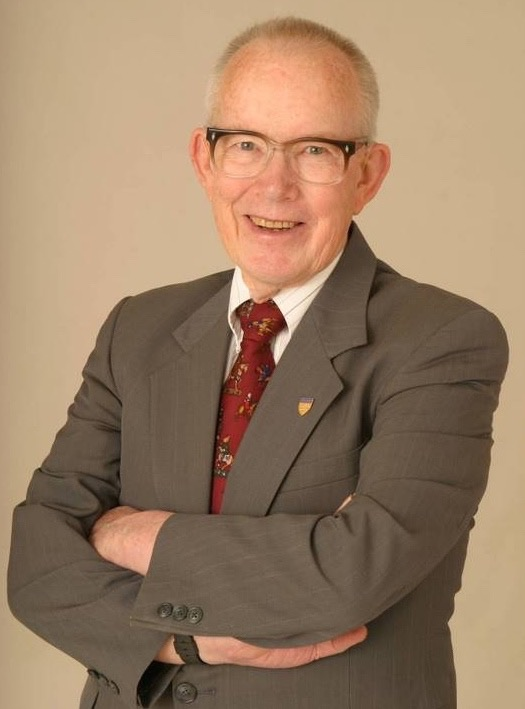
c. 2000

== Professional career ==
Roberts worked at Dames & Moore from 1951 to 1987. His early work involved developing new approaches to analyzing and designing foundations for buildings constructed over soft compressible soils which exhibited the extreme effects of weakness and subsidence. He also studied landslides, soil responses to earthquakes, and expansive soils. In 1961, Roberts became a partner of Dames & Moore.

Roberts was one of the earliest in the engineering profession to develop the principles of sustainability. His career evolved from specialized geotechnical engineering to solving a broader range of problems involving natural hazards and man-made pollution. In 1987 as one of two Senior Partners at Dames & Moore, Roberts joined CH2M Hill as Vice President.

Beginning in the late 1980s, Roberts began to focus on environmental problems, on applying the concepts of sustainable development on a wider scale, and on efforts to encourage cooperation between engineering professionals and environmentalists to solve environmental problems. His keynote presentation in 1990 on the need for sustainability in engineering stimulated efforts in the United States by major engineering societies such as the American Society of Civil Engineers. In this keynote, he presented a model of sustainability, outlined the challenge of sustainability for engineers, and suggested ways in which environmentally friendly approaches and sustainability can be achieved in engineering education. Roberts' keynote influenced the current concerns over global warming and stimulated changes in the engineering curricula in America. It was also one of the initiatives that led to the creation of the World Engineering Partnership for Sustainable Development, and helped with the creation of Engineers Without Borders.

Since 1990, Roberts has presented on the subject of sustainability and became the President of the World Engineering Partnership for Sustainable Development. In 2001, he became vice president of the World Federation of Engineering Organizations, where he published Engineers and Sustainable Development, which is now used extensively in engineering college courses. In 2003, WFEO awarded Roberts the Gold Medal, ‘for outstanding service to humanity’. In 2004, Roberts was the recipient of the Joan Hodges Queaneau Palladium Award, from the American Association of Engineering Societies and the National Audubon Society, for "outstanding achievement in environmental conservation as one of the engineering professions’ most eloquent spokespersons for sustainable development". In 2005 he received the ASCE President's Award. In 2009 ASCE bestowed upon Roberts a Distinguished Membership, the society's highest accolade, for "bringing the principles of sustainability into the lexicon of the engineering profession". Roberts served as a board member of Engineers Without Borders -USA (EWB-USA), was a founder of the Hazardous Waste Coalition, and served as a president of ASFE.

== Bibliography ==
- Foundations for cylindrical storage tanks, Proceedings of the Fifth International Conference on Soil Mechanics and Foundation Engineering, 1961, Paris France, 785-788.
- Area Fill Settlements and Building Foundation Behavior at the San Francisco Airport, Symposium on Field Tests and Measurements for Soils and Foundation Engineering, Pacific Area National Meeting, Los Angeles, CA Sept 30-Oct 5 1962, D. V. Roberts and R.D. Darragh.
- Hazardous Wastes: Liability Insurance and Loss Prevention, Presentation at Spec. Conf. on Geotechnical Practice for Waste Disposal (ASCE). Ann Arbor, 1987
- Sustainable Development – A Challenge for the Engineering Profession, Conference Keynote Address, International Federation of Consulting Engineers (FIDIC) annual conference, June 18, 1990, Oslo Norway.
- Sustainable Development – A Challenge for the Engineering Profession, Proc. IPENZ Annual Conference, Auckland, February 1991
- Sustainable Development - a Challenge for the Engineering Profession, [online]. Transactions of the Institution of Professional Engineers New Zealand: General Section, Vol. 18, No. 1, Nov 1991: 2-8.
- Qualifications Based Selection - What is it? Where is it going?, Consulting Engineers Association of Alberta (Canada). Seminars on September 23–24, 1992. Calgary and Edmonton, Canada.
- Engineering for Sustainable Development, Key Note talk (as a substitute for Al Gore) Summer National Meeting, American Institute of Chemical Engineers, Seattle, Washington. August 16, 1993.
- Engineering for Sustainable Development, International Seminar on Development Aid Policy Approaches to New Generic Technologies, Swedish Agency for Research Cooperation with Developing Countries (SAREC). Hasselbachen, Stockholm, Sweden, April 20–21, 1994
- The Engineer's Role in Sustainable Development, Key Note presentation, American Society of Agricultural Engineers, Kansas City, Missouri. June 20, 1994.
- 2020 Vision for Vertical Enterprises and Global Partnering, Management Honorary Lecturer, International Energy & Environmental Management Symposium, American Society of Mechanical Engineers, Houston, Texas. January 31, 1995
- Sustainable Development: Opportunities and Challenges, ASFE Semi-Annual Meeting, Cancun, Mexico. October 7, 1995
- Sustainable Development - and the Underground Use of Space, North American Tunneling 1996 Conference, Washington DC, April 24, 1996.
- Civil Engineering—The Changing Profession, Eighth Annual Stanley D. Wilson Memorial Lecture, University of Washington, May 2, 1996.
- Sustainable Development and the Use of Underground Space, Tunnelling and Underground Space Technology, Vol. 11, No. 4, October, 1996, p 383-390
- Sustainable Development in Geotechnical Engineering, lecture presented at GeoLogan, American Society of Civil Engineers, July 1997, Logan, Utah.
- Commentary: Sustainable Development: Threat or Opportunity?, Geo-Strata – Geo Institute of ASCE, Vol. 1, No. 3, October 2000, pg. 3
- Engineers and Sustainable Development, 2002; widely used in college engineering courses.
- Beyond The Internet, presented at the World Congress: Engineering and Digital Divide, Tunis, October 2003.
- Geoengineering for the Developing World, Geological and Geotechnical Engineering in the New Millennium: Opportunities for Research and Technological Innovation (2006), National research Council of the National Academies, ISBN 978-0-309-10009-0.
- Lessons Learned, presented at the Annual Meeting ASFE, April 14–17, 2010, New Orleans.
