= Bras de la Plaine Bridge =

Bras de la Plaine Bridge Pont du Bras de la Plaine
- Coordinates: 21°16′35″S 55°27′55″E
- Carries: Motor vehicles, Pedestrians and cyclists
- Crosses: Bras de la Plaine River
- Locale: Réunion, France

Characteristics
- Design: Cantilever bridge, Truss bridge
- Material: Concrete and Steel
- Total length: 305 metres (1,001 ft)
- Width: 10.90 metres (35.8 ft)
- Longest span: 280 metres (920 ft)
- No. of spans: 1
- Clearance below: 110 metres (360 ft)

History
- Construction start: 2000
- Opened: 18 December 2002

Location
- Interactive map of Bras de la Plaine Bridge

The Bras de la Plaine Bridge is a road bridge over the Bras de la Plaine river in Réunion, France. The Bras de la Plaine bridge crosses one of the deeper gorges on the island.

The 280-metre-long (920 ft) single-span bridge is essentially two bridges, each composed of a steel Warren truss, that meet in the middle. The 10.90-metre-wide (35.8 ft) bridge comprises a 6-metre-wide (20 ft) bi-directional carriageway, two 1.35-metre-wide (4.4 ft) pedestrian pavements and two 1.10-metre-wide (3.6 ft) cycle paths. The deck is a prestressed, composite truss structure comprising two concrete slabs linked by two planes of steel tubes in triangular layout.

The Bras de la Plaine Bridge received the 2003 Outstanding Structure Award from the International Association for Bridge and Structural Engineering for being an elegant slender single span composite truss bridge with innovative construction details.

== See also ==
- List of bridges in France
