= Schlaich Bergermann Partner =

Structural engineering and consulting firm, headquartered in Stuttgart, Germany

- Industry: Civil engineering
- Founded: 1980; Stuttgart, Germany
- Headquarters: Stuttgart, Germany
- Number of employees: 150 (as of 2017)
- Website: www.sbp.de

Schlaich Bergermann Partner (stylized sbp) is a nationally and internationally active structural engineering and consulting firm with headquarters in Stuttgart, Germany and branch offices in Berlin, New York City, São Paulo, Shanghai and Paris.

== History ==
The firm was founded in 1980 by Jörg Schlaich and Rudolf Bergermann. They both worked as engineers for the engineering firm Leonhardt, Andrä and Partner in Stuttgart in the 1960s and 1970s that was responsible for the design of the canopy roof structure in the 1972 Olympic grounds in Munich, which was viewed as an aesthetic and structural sensation at the time.

Since 2002, Knut Göppert, Andreas Keil, Sven Plieninger, and Mike Schlaich are leading the firm, with the addition of Knut Stockhusen in 2015.

The firm has achieved national and international renown through the design of light, minimal and innovative structures that combine structural design with architectural aesthetics.

== Work ==
The main focuses of the office are the conception, planning and supervision of construction work for portions of structural engineering projects, such as membrane, glass, roof and facade structures, bridges and cable structures, towers, high rise buildings, and exhibition halls. Also included is peer reviewing for structural integrity and structural analysis.

The firm also has its own department for the development of technologies of solar power generation and employs consulting engineers for renewable energies.

The development and construction of a prototype solar up-draft power plant in Manzanares, Spain was achieved by the solar division of the office in 1982. Likewise, the Dish-Stirling modules for decentralized energy generation have been developed since the beginning of the 1980s. Since 2000 the firm has taken part in the planning and construction of parabolic trough power plants. This technology along with the structures developed by schlaich bergermann partner are currently being employed in a multitude of power plants around the world.

A significant point in the history of the firm is the Vidyasagar Setu, commonly known as the Second Hooghly Bridge, in Calcutta, India. Local requirements for the construction of the bridge stipulated the utilization of local, not weldable steel, that was then installed by local manpower with much manual labor. Thus huge cross-sections, including the pylon heads, were assembled using millions of rivets and thick plates.

For the soccer World Cup in Germany 2006, the Commerzbank-Arena Frankfurt am Main had to be renovated into a new, large-scale sports arena. This necessitated the construction of a mobile roof structure that could be closed across the playing field. In 2004 a new roof with an opening along the longitudinal axis was completed for the Olympic stadium in Berlin, Germany, as well as a new roof for the newly renovated Rhein-Energie-Stadium in Cologne, Germany.

The soccer World Cup 2010 in South Africa (Cape Town, Durban, Port Elizabeth, Johannesburg) as well as the soccer World Cup 2014 in Brazil have also contributed to the firm's growing resume of sport stadiums.

== Implemented Projects ==
- Vidyasagar Setu or Second Hooghly Bridge, Calcutta, India, construction period 1979–1992
- Exhibition Tower in Leipzig, Germany, 1995
- Hoern Bridge in Kiel, Germany, 1997
- Ting-Kau Bridge in Hong Kong, 1998
- Buckel Bridge in Duisburg, Germany, 1999
- Schlaich Tower in Weil am Rhein, Germany, 1999
- Killesberg Tower in Stuttgart, Germany, 2001
- Humboldthafen Bridge in Berlin, Germany, 2002
- Cantilevered roof with membrane and glass cladding Olympic Stadium in Berlin, Germany, 2004
- Liberty Bridge in Greenville, South Carolina, USA, 2004
- Roof RheinEnergieStadium in Cologne, 2004
- Membrane roof with convertible membrane inner roof Commerzbank-Arena in Frankfurt am Main, Germany, 2005
- Central Bus Station in Hamburg, Germany, 2006, awarded the Outstanding Structure Award of the IABSE
- Structural design of the roof of the Nelson-Mandela-Bay-Stadium in Port Elizabeth, South Africa, May 2009
- Roof structure of the renovation of the FNB-Stadium in Johannesburg, South Africa, 2009
- New Roof over BC Place in Vancouver, Canada 2008–2010
- Tensile Roof Structure at The Milk Market, Limerick, Ireland, 2009–2010
- Roof structure of the National Stadium in Warsaw, Poland, 2009–2012
- Spire for One World Trade Center in New York City, 2013
- Harp Bridge, Böblingen, Germany, 2016

== Utilized structural elements and materials ==
The firm has participated in a multitude of technical innovations for various projects.

=== Gridshells ===
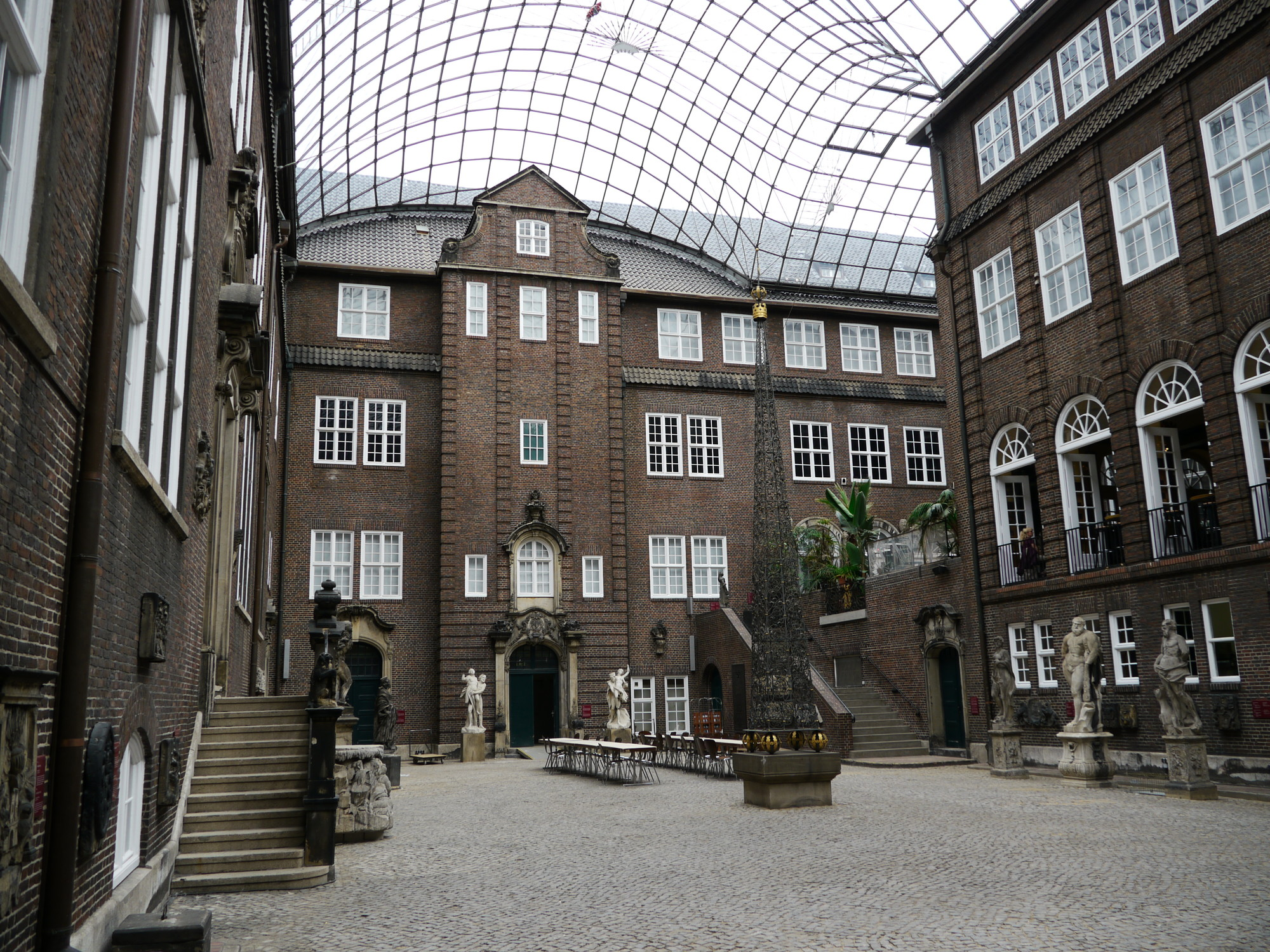
Hamburg Museum's courtyard

The light, transparent roof over the Hamburg Museum's courtyard bears on the building's structure as little as possible. For this gridshell structure the common kitchen sieve was the inspiration: its quadratic mesh grid can be transformed into any desired geometry by altering the mesh grid into a rhombus shape. In combination with a diagonal cable net, the grid transforms into an ideal shell. Clad with glass panes, the result is a lightweight, transparent roof. The glass panes lie directly on the grid beams, thereby merging the load-bearing structure and glass planes. This serves to eliminate the typically necessary secondary structure.

The first application of this concept was the Hamburg Museum, which has now been applied, adapted and further developed to suit a multitude of existing interior courtyards, train stations, and new construction projects: Hippo House of the Berlin Zoo, Germany, German Historic Museum in Berlin, DZ Bank Berlin, Cybele Palace in Madrid and Exhibition Centre Milan.

=== Cable net facades ===
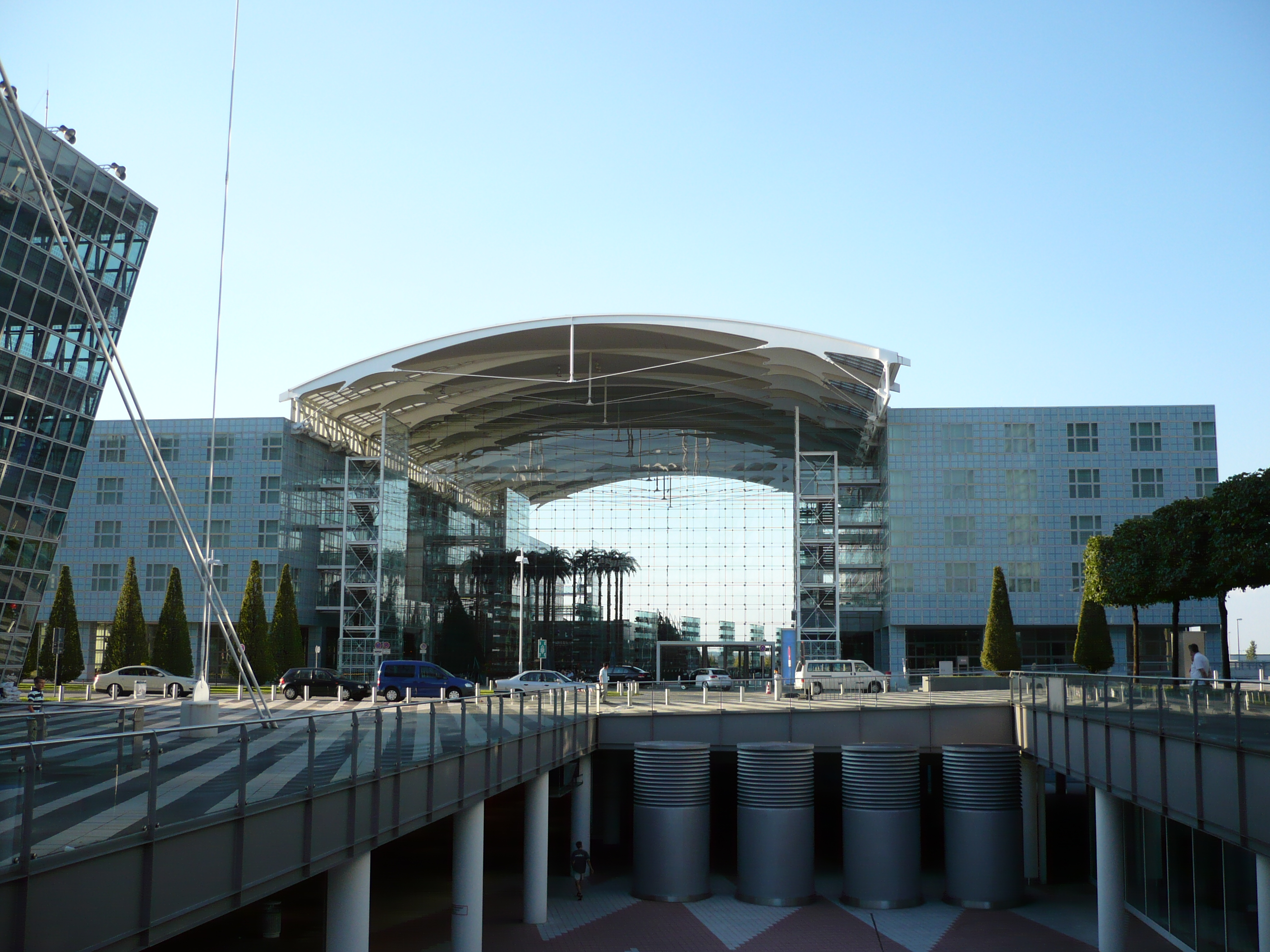
Hilton Munich Airport

For a facade of nearly seamless transparency, parallel cable assemblies span horizontally and vertically in between the sides of the building volumes as well as in between the roof girders and floor of the Kempinski Hotel at the Munich airport. The cable net facade is comparable to a tennis racket. Depending on the degree of pre-tensioning and arrangement of the cable assemblies, a multitude of variations of this structural principle are possible and have been realized: the roof over the Roman Baths in Badenweiler, Germany; CYTS Peking; Main Train Station in Berlin, Germany; Foreign Relations Office in Berlin, Germany; and the Time Warner Center at Columbus Circle in New York City.

=== Cable net roofs ===
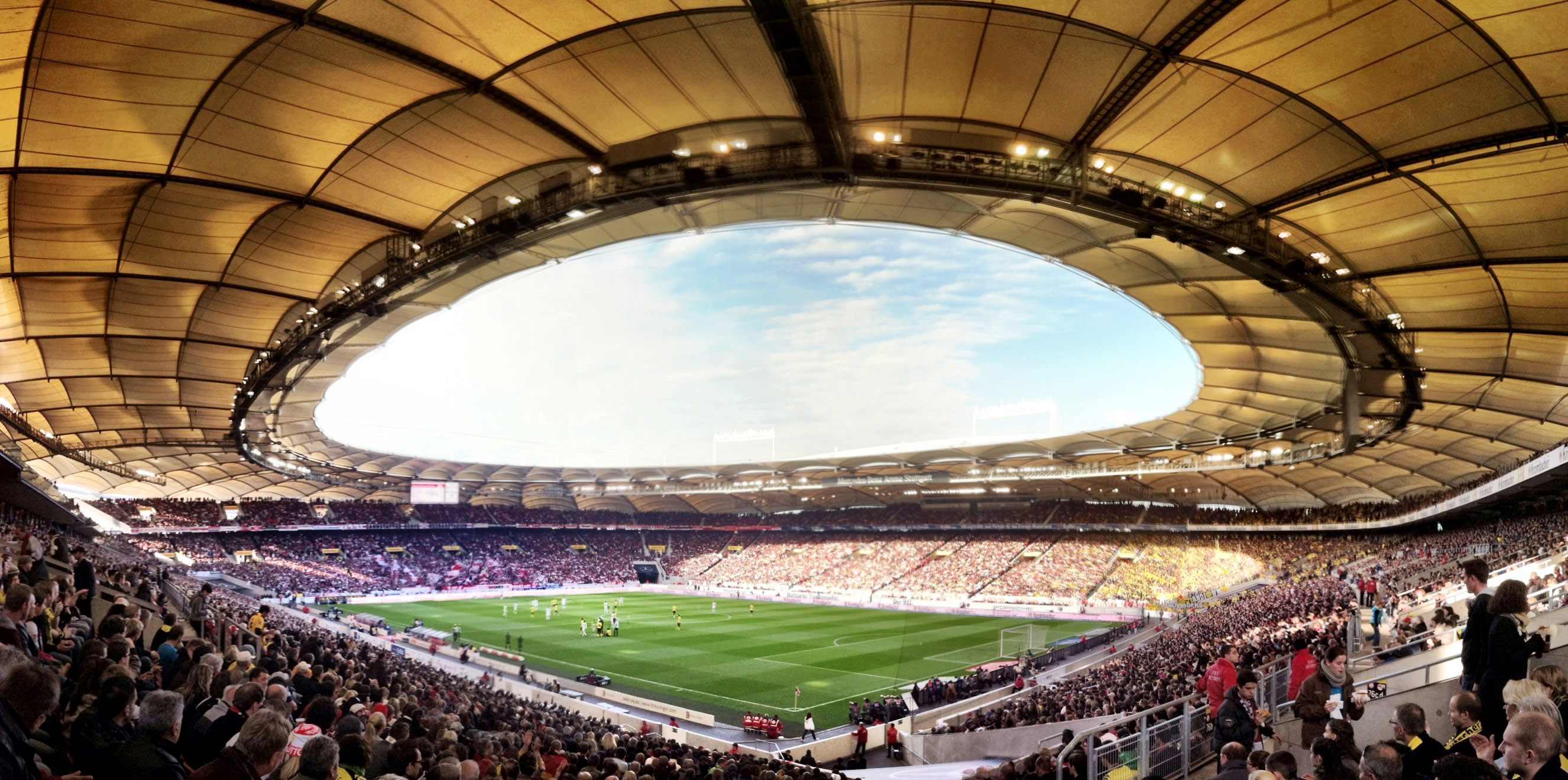
MHPArena interior panorama

The cable net roof is the transformation of the primarily single-plane loading of the spoked wheel to vertical load transfer. It combines the characteristics of cable and membrane structures: in between closed, self-anchored tension and compression rings exists a wide-meshed primary load-bearing structure of cables with a secondary membrane structure tensioned in between. One of the first modern cable net roofs is the MHPArena in Stuttgart. Further examples of this principle are some of the many soccer stadiums worldwide (such as in Berlin, Frankfurt am Main, Cologne, Warsaw, Kapstadt, Durban, Port Elizabeth, and Johannesburg).

=== Membrane roofs ===
Most of the cable net roofs are clad with a textile membrane. Textiles allow for lightweight, transparent roofs and facades that fascinate through their variegated and unusual forms. Due to their negligible weight and inherent foldability, textiles are predestined for convertible roofs. One of the first permanently moveable membrane roofs was the one across the bullfighting arena in Saragossa, Spain, which can be closed and opened like a flower within minutes. This same principle was also applied to the "largest cabriolet of the world," the roof across the Commerzbank Arena in Frankfurt. The only things lighter are structures made of air: the pneumatic pillows of the Arenas Nîmes and Madrid change seasonally within a couple of days or, depending on the weather, within a few minutes.

For the new roof over BC Place in Vancouver the principle of foldable membrane roofs was adapted for the first time with pneumatic pillows, which are inflated and deflated during the folding process.

=== Circular ring beams ===
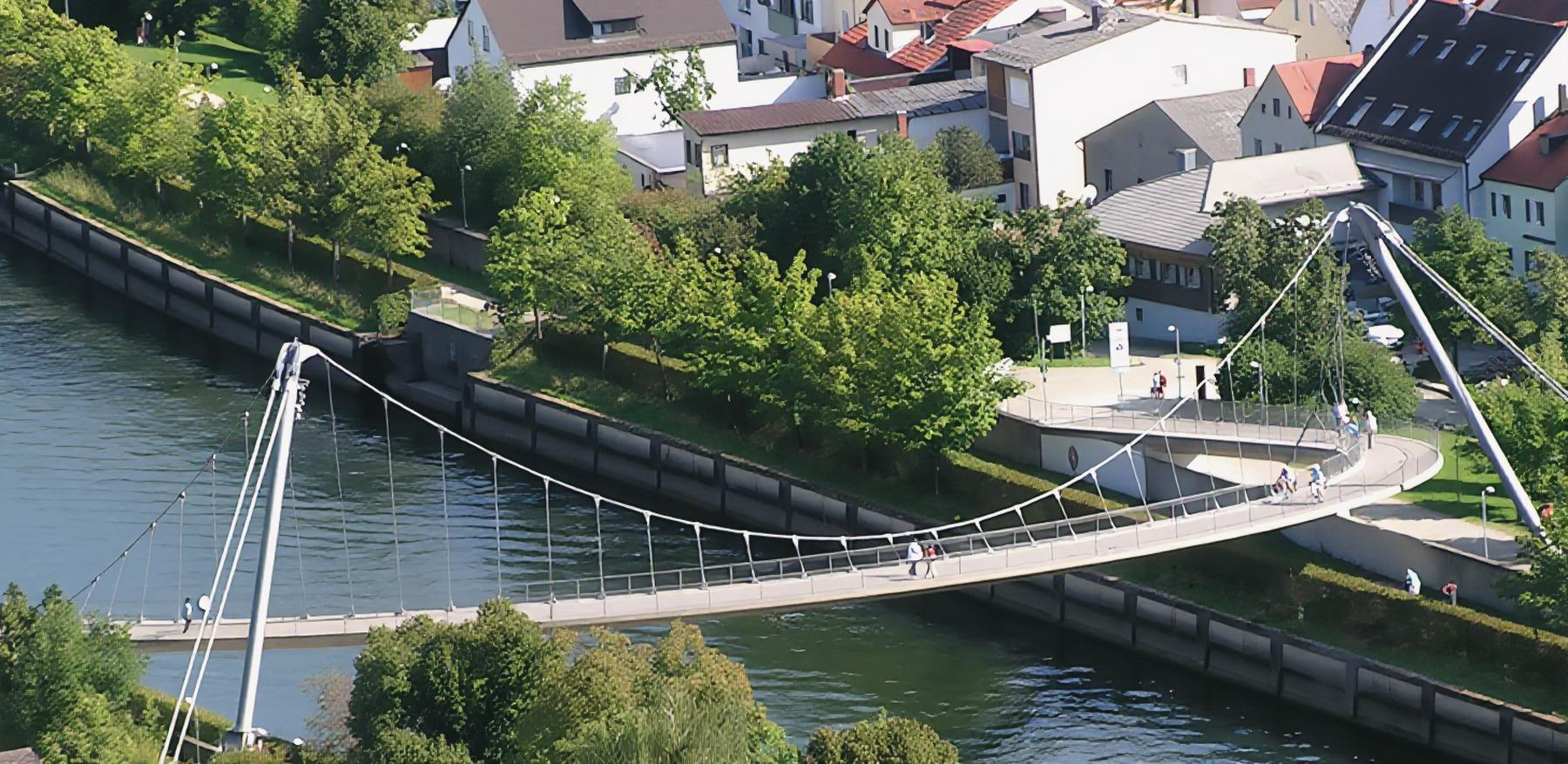
Kelheim bridge across the Main-Danube Canal uses a one-sided suspension bridge architecture

At the time of its erection, the bent plan-view form of the Kelheim bridge across the Main-Danube Canal caused quite a stir: it was the first one-sided suspension bridge. Meanwhile, the engineers of schlaich bergermann partner have varied this principle of the circular ring beam many times, for projects such as the pedestrian bridge in Bochum; across the Gahlensche Street in Gelsenkirchen; the "Balcony to the Ocean" in Sassnitz; and the Liberty Bridge in Greenville, South Carolina, USA. For the ZOB Hamburg, this principle was applied to the roof structure.

=== Cast steel ===
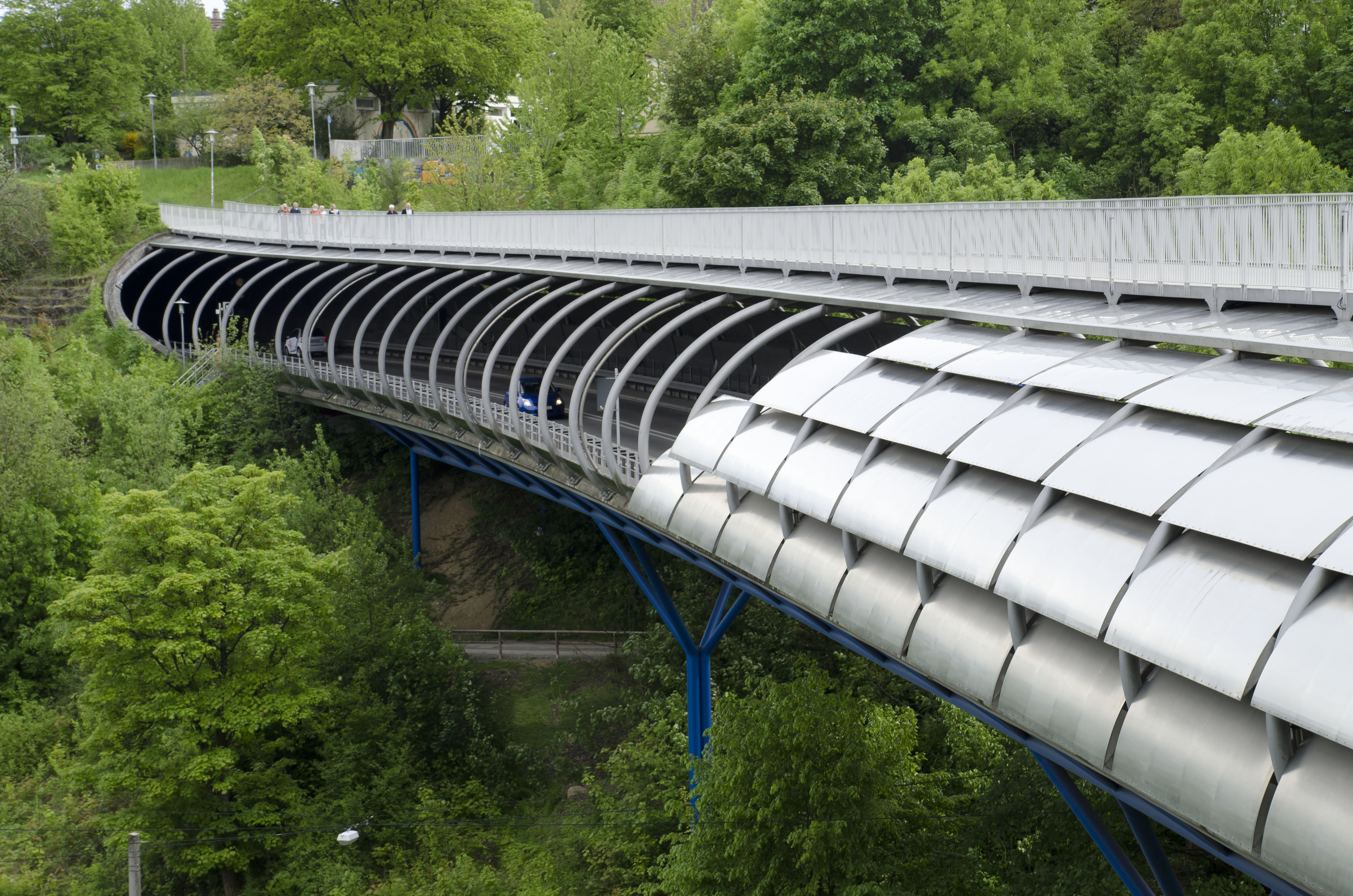
Nesenbachtal Bridge, Stuttgart uses cast steel structural elements

The engineers were a part of the renaissance of cast steel for structural engineering. During the construction of the cable net roofs for the Olympic Games in Munich, this rediscovery made the construction feasible and allowed for the timely completion of the project. The cast steel allows for the production of geometrically complicated pipe nodes and an optimal alignment to the load distribution. Nowadays dynamically curved cast steel nodes are used for street bridges (Nesenbachtal Bridge, Stuttgart) and railroad bridges (Humboldthafen Bridge, Berlin) as well as for high rise buildings (Exhibition Hall 13, Hannover).

== Literature ==
- Holgate, Alan, The Art of Structural Engineering, Edition Axel Menges, Stuttgart (Germany), ISBN 3930698676, 1997
- Schlaich, Jörg; Matthias Schüller; Ingenieurkammer Baden-Württemberg, IngenieurbauFührer Baden-Württemberg, Bauwerk Verlag, 1999
- Bögle, Annette; Schmal, Peter Cachola; Flagge, Ingeborg: leicht weit / Light Structures, Prestel Verlag, Munich (Germany), ISBN 3791329189, 2004
- Baus, Ursula; Schlaich, Mike: Fußgängerbrücken: Konstruktion Gestalt Geschichte, Birkhäuser Verlag, ISBN 9783764381387, 2007
- Schlaich, Jörg; Bergermann, Rudolf; Schiel, Wolfgang; Weinrebe, Gerhard: The Solar Updraft Tower, Bauwerk Verlag
- Jaeger, Falk: 3 Stadia 2010: Architektur für einen afrikanischen Traum, Jovis Verlag, Berlin (Germany), ISBN 9783868590630, 2010
- Schlaich, Jörg, Gut genietet ist besser als schlecht geschweißt. Sozialer Brückenbau - die Second Hooghly Bridge in Calcutta, in: Deutsche BauZeitung DBZ, 8|2010, S. 20f.
- Jaeger, Falk: Next 3 Stadia 2012, Jovis Verlag, Berlin (Germany), ISBN 9783868591545, 2012
