= NJIT Steel Bridge Team =

College engineering competitive team

NJIT Steel Bridge Team is a team within the New Jersey Institute of Technology's ASCE chapter. It consists of undergraduate students from NJIT, majoring in civil engineering, and members of ASCE. Annually, the team competes against other colleges in a steel bridge competition.

Every year, the team holds fundraising events and secures corporate sponsors to cover the cost of supplies. Members also get together for social activities and outreach to high schools to talk about civil engineering and the steel bridge competition.

== Competition ==
The competition occurs annually at different locations. If one to four teams compete in the regionals, the best team proceeds to the national competition. If five to ten teams compete in the regionals, the two best teams go to the national competition. If ten or more teams compete in the regionals, the top three go to the national competition. The prize for winning the national competition is $2,500

The objective of the competition is to design a bridge that is light, yet strong and economical, and to assemble it fast with as few team members as possible.

The competition has three stages:

- Design and testing, which students do themselves using programs and knowledge they learned from classes, and sometimes help from professors and alumni
- Fabrication, which is when students grind, weld, and fit the parts together
- Assembly, which is when students put the parts together to achieve the designed bridge.

There are 6 categories in scoring: display (how the bridge looks), construction speed (time management), construction economy (low cost to build), lightness, stiffness (aggregate deflection), and structural efficiency.

== Awards ==
=== 2001 Regional Competition ===
- Second Place Overall
- First Place Efficiency
- First Place Aesthetics

=== 2002 Regional Competition ===
- First Place Overall
- First Place Efficiency
- First Place Stiffness

=== 2003 Regional Competition ===
- First Place Overall
- First Place Lightness
- First Place Efficiency
- First Place Economy
- First Place Stiffness
- First Place Construction Speed

=== 2005 Regional Competition ===
- Second Place Overall
- First Place Efficiency
- First Place Aesthetics
- First Place Stiffness

=== 2007 Regional Competition ===
- First Place Overall

=== 2008 Regional Competition ===
- First Place Overall

=== 2009 Regional Competition ===
- First Place Overall

=== 2010 Regional Competition ===
- First Place Overall

=== 2012 Regional Competition ===
- 1st Place Overall

=== 2012 National Competition at Clemson, SC ===
- 15th Place Overall
- 9th Place in Construction Speed
