= Anton Tedesko =

- Born: May 25, 1903; Grünberg, Silesia, German Empire
- Died: April 2, 1994 (aged 90); Seattle, Washington, U.S.
- Education: TU Wien
- Awards: ASCE Civil Engineering Achievement Award (1966)
- Engineering career
- Employer(s): Dyckerhoff & Widmann; Roberts and Schaefer
- Projects: Hersheypark Arena; Hayden Planetarium; Vehicle Assembly Building; Cape Canaveral Launch Complex 36

Anton Tedesko (May 25, 1903 – April 2, 1994) was an Austrian-American structural engineer. He is known for introducing thin-shell concrete structures to engineering practice in the United States.

== Biography ==
Tedesko was the son of the chemist Victor Tedesko. He grew up in Graz and Vienna and studied civil engineering at the Vienna University of Technology (TU Wien), receiving his diploma in 1926. He subsequently spent two and a half years (from 1927 to 1929) in the United States. Starting in 1930, he worked at Dyckerhoff & Widmann (D&W), where, under the influence of Franz Dischinger and Ulrich Finsterwalder, he became familiar with the then-developing theory of thin-shell analysis as structural frameworks. A milestone in this field was the 1922 construction of the dome for the Zeiss-Planetarium Jena by Dischinger using the patented Zeiss-Dywidag System (Z-D), which was later adapted for barrel roofs.

To promote the method in the United States, D&W sent Tedesko to the construction firm Roberts and Schaefer (R&S) in Chicago in 1932; he was hired by the firm in 1934. The new system found its first application in the Hayden Planetarium in New York City, which had a diameter of 81 feet (25 m) and a concrete wall thickness of 3 inches (76 mm). The first application for barrel-roofed halls was at the 1933 World's Fair (the Brook Hill Farm Dairy Barn, span 36 feet (11 m), concrete thickness 3 inches (76 mm); tested for research purposes after the fair). His design for the roof of the Hershey Arena in Hershey, Pennsylvania (222 feet (68 m) span) already deviated significantly from German practice.

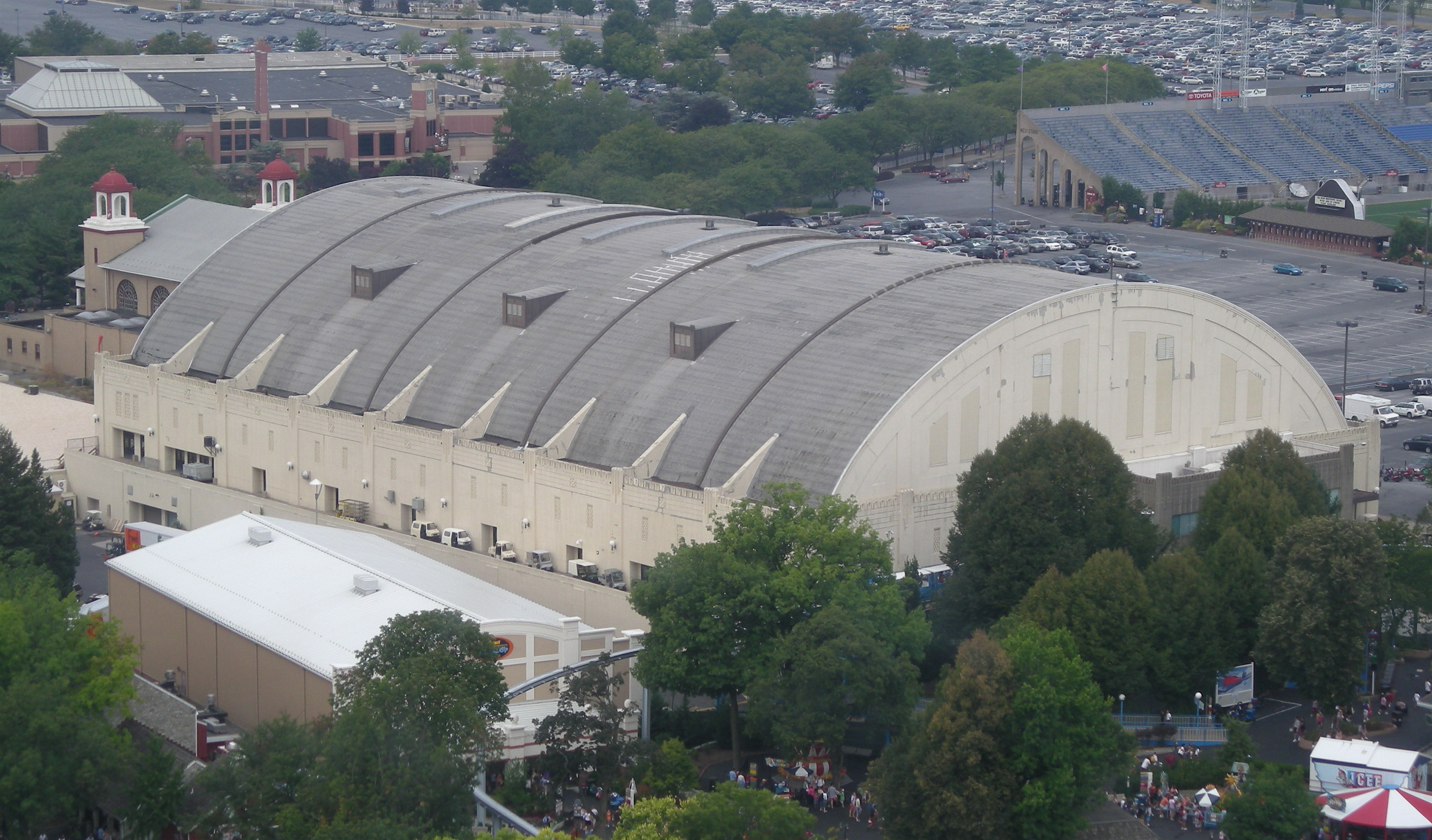
Hershey Arena

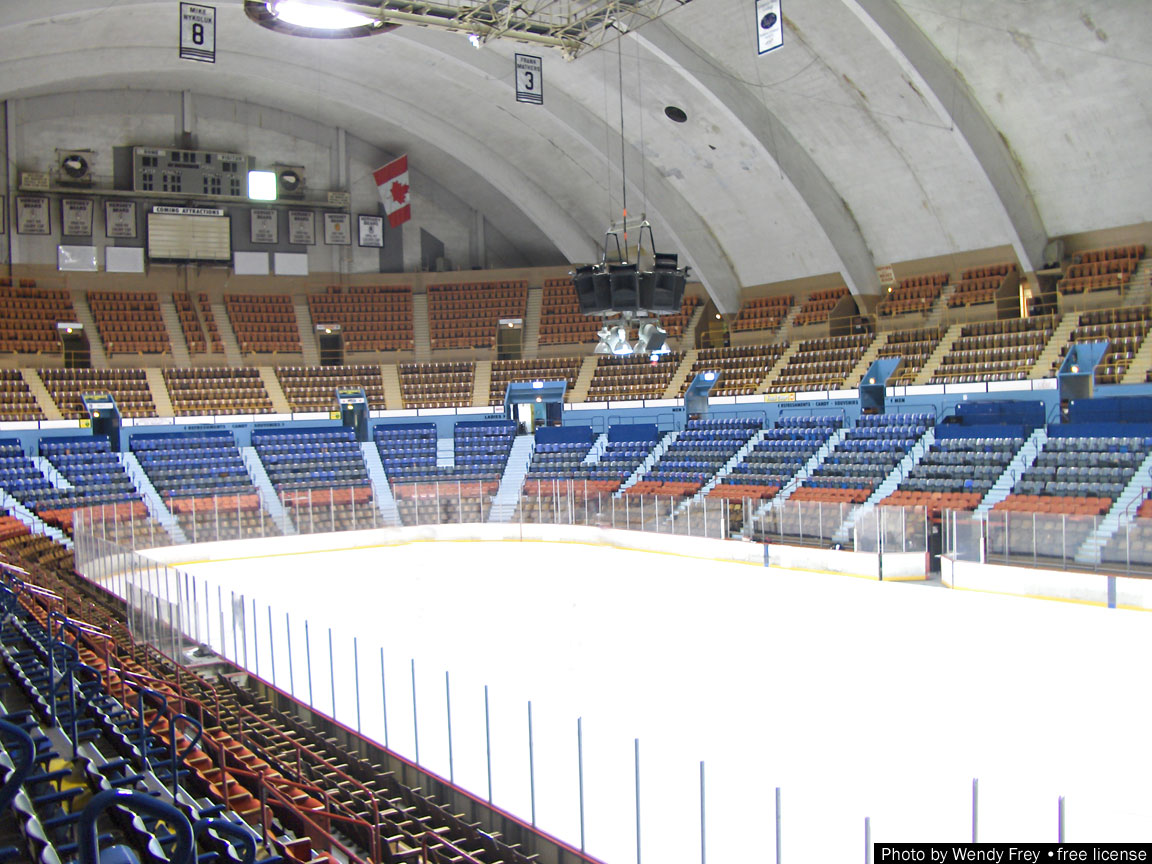
Interior of Hershey Arena

During World War II and the period immediately following, Tedesko designed a series of roofs for aircraft hangars, for example for the United States Air Force in 1948 in Rapid City and Limestone, Maine, with a 340 feet (100 m) span and 5 inches (130 mm) thickness.

In 1950, he introduced the concept of the "ribless shell". This was realized on a full scale (not just as a model) for the first time in 1958 for a US Air Force warehouse at Olmstead Air Force Base (now Harrisburg International Airport) in Pennsylvania (39 feet (12 m) span, 3 inches (76 mm) thickness).

Tedesko also designed the Vehicle Assembly Building (VAB) for NASA at the Kennedy Space Center in Florida, which was completed in 1966. It holds the record for the building enclosing the largest volume. He was also responsible for the design of Launch Complex 36. In total, he designed around 60 shell structures. He was also known for his communication skills; he described himself less as an innovative designer of shell structures than as an experienced strategist, who often succeeded in getting his designs accepted even if his name was not mentioned.

Even at the age of 88, he completed a design for the new Williamsburg Bridge (together with his 90-year-old former supervisor at D&W, Ulrich Finsterwalder).

== Awards and legacy ==
In 1966, he received the Civil Engineering Achievement Award from the American Society of Civil Engineers (ASCE). In 1998, the International Association for Bridge and Structural Engineering (IABSE) established the Anton Tedesko Medal in his honor.

His papers are held at Princeton University. He was friends with the German structural engineer Hubert Rüsch since his youth.
