= Engineering Week =

Engineering Week may refer to:

- Engineering Week (Canada), an annual event held by engineering schools throughout Canada.
- National Engineering Week (Canada), held by the Canadian Council of Professional Engineers.
- National Engineers Week (U.S.), held in the United States.
