= Anton Tedesko Medal =

- Awarded for: Life achievements in structural engineering (Distinguished Structural Engineer)
- Sponsored by: International Association of Bridge and Structural Engineers (IABSE) Foundation
- Rewards: Medal for Laureate; Grant of 25,000 CHF for Young Engineer Study Leave
- First award: 1998
- Website: https://iabsefoundation.org/

The Anton Tedesko Medal is awarded by the International Association of Bridge and Structural Engineers (IABSE) Foundation to both honour a Laureate and financially support a young engineering Fellow of the Association.

The medal is awarded to a distinguished structural engineer as recognition of his/her life achievements, and includes a grant of 25,000 CHF for study leave for a promising young engineer to gain practical experience in a prestigious engineering firm outside his/her home country.

The medal is named after and honours Anton Tedesko (1903 - 1994) (sometimes written 'Tedesco') who was an outstanding engineer, eminent designer and builder of innovative structures. the award was created in 1998.

Past recipients include:

Year	Laureate	Fellow
2021	Mike Schlaich, Germany	Supriya Banerjee, India
2015	Esko Järvenpää, Finland	
2012	Professor Emeritus Paul Grundy, Australia	
2010	Koichi Takanashi, Japan	
2008	Hai-Fan Xiang, China	Marvin Sabado, Philippines
2007	John C. Badoux, Switzerland	Anand P. Singh, Nepal
2004	Robert Silman, USA	John Anderson, USA
2002	Hajime Okamura, Japan	Amorn Pimanmas, Thailand
2000	Niels J. Gimsing, Denmark	Dong Xu, China
1998	Alexander C. Scordelis, USA	Diego Cobo del Arco, Spain

== See also ==
- List of engineering awards
- List of prizes named after people
