= Federal Engineer of the Year Award =

The Federal Engineer of the Year Award is an annual award sponsored by the National Society of Professional Engineers and the Professional Engineers in Government advocacy group of the NSPE.

The 2009 Awards were the 30th annual award. The award recognizes technical excellence, publications, leadership, and community service. Each major subgroup of the federal government that employs 50 or more professional engineers selects and nominates an agency winner. From these a list of the top ten are selected and announced. The ultimate winner of the Federal Engineer of the Year is announced at a luncheon award ceremony during National Engineers Week.

== See also ==
- List of engineering awards
