= Engineering Leadership Award =

The Engineering Leadership Award Scheme was created by the Royal Academy of Engineering (RAEng) and comprises two types of national award for engineering undergraduates: the Standard Award and the Advanced Award.

Up to forty Engineering Leadership Advanced Awards and a few hundred Standard Awards are distributed each year. Holders of the advanced award must be engineering undergraduates studying for an MEng at British universities with outstanding academic ability and marked leadership potential. Standard award holders must be engineering students who are UK nationals, or who have participated in the following pre-university schemes: Young Engineers, Headstart, the Engineering EducationScheme, The Smallpeice Trust, and the Year in Industry.

The scheme is predominantly sponsored by Department for Business, Innovation & Skills and engineering firms, and aims to guide and accelerate the personal development of Britain's future engineering leaders.

== History ==
The award scheme was started in 1996. Each year's advanced award holders are collectively known as a “Cohort”. Cohort 18 was announced in April 2013.

== Selection ==
The selection procedure for the advanced award consists of two stages:

1) Complete a written application, which must be supported by an academic and an industrial reference. This must be received by the RAEng by early December.

2) If the application is successful, the applicant will be asked to attend a two-day selection event in March. During the selection event applicants are interviewed by a fellow of the RAEng and a Sainsbury's Management Fellow.

The award winners are usually announced a fortnight after the selection event.

== Benefits ==
Advanced award holders receive the following benefits:

- Up to £5,000 over three years for activities that develop their leadership potential
- Seminars and workshops which provide management training and career development advice.
- Access to a mentor panel of Sainsbury Management Fellows.

Standard award holders have the opportunity to take part in a number of development activities and course free of charge.

== See also ==
- List of engineering awards
