= Melvin A. Cook =

American chemist

Melvin Alonzo Cook (October 10, 1911 – October 12, 2000) was an American chemist, most known from his work in explosives, including the development of shaped charges and slurry explosives.

== Biography ==
Melvin was born on October 10, 1911, in Garden City, Utah to Alonzo Laker Cook and Maude Osmond. Cook was a lifelong member of the Church of Jesus Christ of Latter-day Saints. He received a Master of Arts from the University of Utah in 1934 and a Ph.D. in physical chemistry from Yale University in 1937. He worked for the DuPont company. He founded and served as President of IRECO Chemicals (later acquired by Dyno Nobel). He also served as a professor of metallurgy and mechanical engineering at the University of Utah. He died on October 12, 2000, in Salt Lake City, Utah following complications from surgery.

== Family ==
Melvin married Wanda Garfield. They had three sons and two daughters. Their son, Merrill Cook, became a politician who served as the U.S. representative for Utah's second congressional district from 1997 to 2001. He was related to the Osmond Family through his mother, Alice Maude Osmond, a cousin to George Osmond.

== Scientist and Inventor: Explosives ==
His career (which lasted over 50 years) in theoretical and practical explosives spans some remarkable achievements. As an expert in explosives, Melvin was an investigator of the 1947 fertilizer explosion in Texas City, Texas. The Texas City Disaster is considered the worst industrial accident in United States history. In December 1956, he created a new blasting agent using a mixture of ammonium nitrate, aluminum powder and fuel oil, which was an unusual mixture at the time. This explosive, the first of the so-called "slurry explosives" was remarkably safe. He did consulting work for the Iron Ore Company of Canada, where the aluminized ammonium nitrate slurry explosive he developed was successfully used. His work on slurry explosives paved the way for the development of the BLU-82, nicknamed the "Daisy Cutter" (because of its use in Vietnam to clear helicopter landing zones), one of the largest and most powerful conventional bombs in the U.S. military inventory, using aluminized slurry.

== Awards and recognitions ==
For his work in discovering slurry explosives, Cook received a Nitro Nobel Gold Medal in 1968, only the second time the award had been given. (This award is not to be confused with the Nobel Prize conferred by the Nobel Foundation).

== Creationism ==
Dr. Cook was an ardent creationist, and his writings on the subject are frequently quoted or cited by creationists. Cook was not, however, a "young Earth" creationist, believing that "the creation was a refash[i]oning and reforming . . . of the surface features of the earth, not the earth as a whole" while "[t]he age of the earth turns out to be about half that claimed by geophysicists, but the solar system is found to be about the same as claimed by earth scientists." In some of his work in this area of creation theory he provided arguments in favor of a 6000-year-old planetary surface. One argument for a "young Earth," which he wrote about in his book, Science and Mormonism, was that the atmosphere had not yet reached an equilibrium state with respect to carbon-14 creation/decay, and thus the atmosphere of Earth was in fact not older than 6000 years, although this has been debated. He wrote an introduction to the 1954 book Man, His Origin and Destiny, by Joseph Fielding Smith.

== Selected bibliography ==
=== Books ===
- Prehistory and Earth Models (1966, ISBN 0356011925)
- Science and Mormonism (1968, ASIN B00166NKK4) with his son, M. Garfield Cook.
- The Autobiography of Melvin A. Cook (1973 ASIN : B00070S6JK)
- Scientific Prehistory: A Sequel of Prehistory and Earth Models (1993, ASIN B002UQWY0Q)

=== Articles ===
- "Plasma and Universal Gravitation" — From Appendix III, The Science of High Explosives — American Chemical Society Monograph Series No. 139 (1958)

=== Other frequently cited writings ===
- "What Happened to the Earth's Helium?" — New Scientist, Vol. 24, 3 December 1964, pp. 631–632
- "Where is the Earth's Radiogenic Helium?" — Nature, Vol. 179, 26 January 1957, p. 213 doi:10.1038/179213a0

== External sources ==
- Article on the BLU-82 at GlobalSecurity.org
- Notation on The Melvin Cook Papers (1802–1989) at the University of Utah
- TalkOrigins Archive article on a Melvin Cook claim
- Who's Who in Creation/Evolution at ChristianAnswers.net
- History of Dyno Nobel
- Melvin A. Cook at IMDb
