= Schwäbisch Gmünd Prize =

The Schwäbisch Gmünd Prize for Young Scientists is an annual award given by the European Academy of Surface Technology (EAST) to an early career researcher active in Europe on the grounds of originality, creativity and excellence in surface technology. The prize aims to promote science, research and education in the field of surface technology as part of EAST efforts to promote friendship and integration within the European scientific and technological community.

The award is named in honor of the town of Schwäbisch Gmünd and its long tradition of craftsmanship of precious metals. The town has also been the location of EAST headquarters since its foundation in 1989. The prize is presented in a public lecture during an event sponsored by or co-organised by EAST, such as electrochemistry, corrosion or surface finishing related conferences.

== Recipients of the Schwäbisch Gmünd Prize ==
To the date, three early career researchers have received the prize:

- 2017 - J. Zhang
- 2018 - N. T. Nguyen
- 2019 - L. F. Arenas
- 2020 - M. Leimbach
- 2021 - K. Eiler

== See also ==
- List of engineering awards
- Electroplating
