= International Medal =

- Awarded for: Exceptional contributions to engineering as a whole through practice, management or education.
- Sponsored by: Royal Academy of Engineering
- Date: 1991
- Location: London
- Country: United Kingdom
- Website: https://www.raeng.org.uk/grants-and-prizes/prizes/prizes-and-medals/individual-medals/international-medal

The International Medal is an award presented by the Royal Academy of Engineering in the UK, to individuals who are non-UK citizens or residents. It is awarded to individuals who have made exceptional contributions to engineering.

== Background ==
The medal is given annually to recognize individuals who have made sustained personal achievements in any field of engineering. Individuals are foreign nationals who are not citizens nor residents of the UK.

== Winners ==
Source: RAE

- 2011 Andrew Viterbi (United States)
- 2008 Abdul Kalam (India)
- 2007 Xu Kuangdi (China)
- 2006 Cham Tao Soon (Singapore)

== See also ==
- List of engineering awards
