= Nitro Nobel Gold Medal =

The Nitro Nobel Gold Medal is an explosives industry award given by the Nitro Nobel Company of Sweden (now part of Dyno Nobel).

The medal is gold, and features the same obverse as the Nobel Prize, but a different reverse. The medal has sometimes been confused with the Nobel Prize.

The award has only been given three times since its creation in 1967. The recipients are:

- 1967 — Dr. Robert W. Van Dolah, for the development of a theory he developed to explain the accidental initiation of liquid explosives
- 1968 — Dr. Melvin A. Cook, for the discovery of slurry explosives
- 1990 — Dr. Per-Anders Persson for the invention of the Nonel fuze.

== See also ==
- List of engineering awards
