= Imraan Faruque =

- Born: August 9, 1984 (age 41); Alexandria, Virginia
- Education: B.S. Virginia Tech
- Known for: UAV Development

Dr. Imraan Faruque is an American who is most known as a designer and author in the unmanned aerial vehicle (UAV) field. He is the designer responsible for a variety of UAVs, including several currently operational in Iraq, the most well-known being the R-series UAVs which are based on commercial airframes, along with work on Insitu's ScanEagle. These vehicles are normally deployed as a part of reconnaissance missions as they are unarmed but carry either a significant camera or FLIR unit.

== Personal life ==
Faruque was born on August 9, 1984, in Alexandria, Virginia, but soon moved to Charlottesville, Virginia, where he lived until 2002. Faruque then moved to Blacksburg, Virginia, where he earned a B.S. in aerospace engineering at Virginia Tech. Faruque participated in the FIRST Robotics Competition. Faruque is the brother of fellow Virginia Tech graduate, Ruel Faruque, a researcher and team member for the Virginia Tech DARPA Urban Challenge team. On July 16, 2016, he was married to Rachel Mumbert.

== Organizational involvement ==
Faruque is a member of the American Institute of Aeronautics and Astronautics, an alumnus founding member of the Royal Aeronautical Society's Human Powered Aircraft Group at Virginia Tech, a Minta Martin Endowed Fellow at the University of Maryland, and is reported to do advisory work for various government and university agencies in unmanned aerial vehicle design and flight test at the Army's Fort Benning, GA; Eglin Air Force Base, FL; Tyndall Air Force Base, FL; and Patuxent River Naval Air Station, MD . He serves as a worship leader for Chi Alpha Campus Ministries. Imraan is a post-doctorate scholar of the Virginia University of Maryland Autonomous Vehicle Laboratory where he has worked on "insect-like robots."

== Published works ==
Faruque's published works include

- Initial Development of a Vision-Controlled Diesel-Fueled Unmanned Aerial System (which he briefed at the 2006 AIAA Midatlantic Regional Student Conference),
- Development of an Autonomous Aerial Reconnaissance Platform at Virginia Tech,
- Flight Test Bed for Visual Tracking of Small UAVs.
- Control-Oriented Reduced Order Modeling of Dipteran Flapping Flight
- A draft manuscript of a book entitled UAV Analysis, Design, and Piloting for Engineers has seen use in senior design courses at Virginia Tech.
