= National Institute for Certification in Engineering Technologies =

NICET logo

The National Institute for Certification in Engineering Technologies (NICET) is an organization that was established in 1961 to create a recognized certification for engineering technicians and technologists within the United States. A 1981 study by the National Cooperative Highway Research Program (NCHRP), requested by the American Association of State Highway and Transportation Officials' SubCommittee On Construction (AASHTO SCOC), prompted the National Society of Professional Engineers (NSPE) to merge two certification bodies; the Institute for the Certification of Engineering Technicians (ICET) and the Engineering Technologist Certification Institute. The result is a nonprofit organization that provides a nationally recognized and accepted procedure for recognition of qualified engineering technicians and technologists.

NICET is a not for profit division of the NSPE.

The NICET registration process is separated into two class distinctions with subcategories and several specialized areas of focus. The titles of the "Certified Engineering Technician" and "Certified Engineering Technologist" are the primary designations. The subcategories are further specialized by focus. The titles chosen for these subcategories are known as Civil Engineering or Electrical/Mechanical Systems. Within the subcategories the disciplines are refined to address a selected area of expertise and are limited by categories that do not cover all areas of Technology.

== The purpose of certification programs ==
NICET's nationally recognized certification programs lay out a path for career advancement from entry to senior level responsibilities. Designed by industry experts to provide engineering technology fields with a qualified workforce, programs are used by employers and specifiers to measure job skills and knowledge.

== Technician certification ==
Technician certification requires testing (written, multiple choice) and documentation including a work history, recommendations, and, for most programs, supervisor verification of specific experience.

== Technologist certification ==
Technologist certification requires a 4-year engineering technology degree (no testing required), and at the advanced level, documentation including a work history and endorsements.

== Training certificates ==
NICET's professional certification is based on testing that covers a broad range of job knowledge, verification of job performance, and an evaluation of work experience. NICET certification represents a career level (i.e., not a course outcome). NICET's certification cannot be gained by attendance only.

== Credibility ==
There are competing ideologies from societies with different perspectives on what represents the qualities of a Technologist. The Society of Broadcast Engineers (SBE) has a different technologist certification criteria than either NICET or the National Association of Industrial Technologist. The Society of Manufacturing Engineers (SME) has a different approach from the other certification bodies for Technologist. It is therefore appropriate to determine that a unified definition for certification is not apparent.

The Technologist title from NICET does not require an examination for registration at the Technologist level. However, individuals sit for examination at the Technician levels. The Technologist registration requires that an individual will have graduated from a university that is ABET/TAC accredited and provide evidence of appropriate experience. The Technologist Certification level is not achievable by non-ABET graduates. Open knowledge based testing for graduates of applied science programs and non-ABET accredited education is currently not allowed. The NICET Engineering Technologist Certification is therefore a limited access membership.

== Exclusions ==
NICET excludes Technologist registration for individuals who have graduated from applied science programs or those who obtained valid education from non-ABET/TAC universities recognized by CHEA or the US Department of Education. Open registration concepts that may rely on examinations and/or experiential qualifications would improve the acceptance of the NICET certifications.

Some program accreditations that are excluded from the NICET program are the Distance Education and Training Council (DETC), the National Association of Industrial Technology (NAIT), the Accrediting Commission of Career Schools and Colleges of Technology (ACCSCT), or other non-ABET/TAC institutions that are exclusively regionally accredited such as the Thomas Edison Engineering Technology program, but they do accept ABET/TAC accredited programs from that University such as Electronic Systems Engineering Technology.

== Job placement ==
A Technologist curriculum may focus on specialized issues such as technical management, service, processes, or production improvements. The Council for Higher Education Accreditation (CHEA) acknowledges the different accreditations in technology and engineering as independent career paths which cannot be compared.

The United States Bureau of Labor Statistics had the following to say about technologist.

“Many 4-year colleges offer bachelor’s degrees in engineering technology, but graduates of these programs often are hired to work as technologists or applied engineers, not technicians." (BLS, 2006)

Use of NICET certification varies according to needs determined by employers, specifiers, and local government. Specific certification requirements established throughout the United States vary by engineering technology fields in various states and localities. Some areas may require a NICET or similar certification as condition for employment. Often an engineering technology degree is used in lieu of a technician certification in areas where they deem a four year engineering technology degree to have more value than a technician certification earned through work history and testing requirements.

Unlike Professional Engineers who are licensed by the States, Technologists are not protected or licensed by States. A government sponsored registration is opposed by the NCEES and NSPE.

== Sources ==
- NICET - Technologist Programs Application Forms and Procedures - retrieved on (7/7/06).
- Wilder, P. (2000) Accreditation Reclassification: Expanding the Perspective - retrieved on August 28, 2006.
- NSPE (2006) NSPE Issue Brief: Engineering Technology Publication #4049 - retrieved on Sept 4, 2006.
- Bureau of Labor Statistics, U.S. Department of Labor - Occupational Outlook Handbook, 2006-07 Edition, Engineering Technicians - visited August 7, 2006.
