= Student Steel Bridge Competition =

Annual engineering contest for students

The American Institute of Steel Construction Student Steel Bridge Competition is an annual contest where teams of university students from American Society of Civil Engineers (ASCE) Student Chapters studying the field of structural engineering where the students design and fabricate a bridge. The bridges must follow the specifications worded out in the rule book. Once the bridges are fabricated, students will go and build assemble the bridge at a competition.

== History ==
The competition began as a miniature bridge design competition using balsa wood to see which competitor's bridge is the best. Robert E. Shaw Jr., associate director of Education for the American Institute of Steel Construction (AISC), initiated the steel bridge competition in the spring of 1987 and was honored by the AISC in 2000.

The first teams to compete were Lawrence Technological University (who hosted the competition), Wayne State University, and Michigan Technological University. In 1988, the competition grew to four regional conference competitions: North Central at the University of Detroit, Great Lakes at the Rose-Hulman Institute of Technology, Carolinas at the University of North Carolina at Charlotte, and Ohio Valley at the University of Louisville. In 1992, Fromy Rosenberg, who was the Director of AISC College Relations, began the first National Student Steel Bridge Competition.

== Past champions ==
The following are past champions.

| Year | Host | Champion | Runner up |
|---|---|---|---|
| 1992 | Michigan State University | Michigan State University | Unknown |
| 1993 | Southern Polytechnic State University | University of Alaska Fairbanks | Unknown |
| 1994 | San Diego State University | Rensselaer Polytechnic Institute | Unknown |
| 1995 | University of Florida | North Dakota State University | Unknown |
| 1996 | SUNY Buffalo | University of Alaska Fairbanks | Unknown |
| 1997 | California State Polytechnic University, Pomona | University of Florida | Unknown |
| 1998 | Colorado State University | University of Southwestern Louisiana | Unknown |
| 1999 | University of Alaska Anchorage | University of Nevada, Reno | Unknown |
| 2000 | Texas A&M University | California State University, Chico | Unknown |
| 2001 | Clemson University | Clemson University | Unknown |
| 2002 | University of Wisconsin, Madison | North Dakota State University | Unknown |
| 2003 | San Diego State University | University of Michigan | University of Wisconsin-Madison |
| 2004 | Colorado School of Mines | North Dakota State University | University of Michigan |
| 2005 | University of Central Florida | University of California, Davis | University of Florida |
| 2006 | University of Utah | North Dakota State University | SUNY Canton |
| 2007 | California State University, Northridge | North Dakota State University | University of California, Davis |
| 2008 | University of Florida | University of California, Berkeley | University of Florida |
| 2009 | University of Nevada Las Vegas | SUNY Canton | North Dakota State University |
| 2010 | Purdue University | North Dakota State University | University of California, Berkeley |
| 2011 | Texas A&M University | Lakehead University | Michigan Technological University |
| 2012 | Clemson University | University of California, Berkeley | Massachusetts Institute of Technology |
| 2013 | University of Washington | University of California, Berkeley | Massachusetts Institute of Technology |
| 2014 | University of Akron | University of California, Davis | Massachusetts Institute of Technology |
| 2015 | University of Missouri, Kansas City | University of Florida | California Polytechnic State University, San Luis Obispo |
| 2016 | Brigham Young University | École de Technologie Supérieure | California Polytechnic State University, San Luis Obispo |
| 2017 | Oregon State University | École de Technologie Supérieure | California Polytechnic State University, San Luis Obispo |
| 2018 | University of Illinois at Urbana-Champaign | Lafayette College | California Polytechnic State University, San Luis Obispo |
| 2019 | Southern Illinois University Carbondale | Lafayette College | University of Florida |
| 2020 | Canceled due to COVID-19 | | |
| 2021 | Canceled due to COVID-19 | University of Florida | Lafayette College |
| 2022 | Virginia Tech | University of Florida | University of Alaska, Fairbanks |
| 2023 | University of California, San Diego | University of Florida | Youngstown State University |
| 2024 | Louisiana Tech | University of Florida | SUNY Buffalo |
| 2025 | Iowa State University | University of Florida | Lafayette College |
| 2026 | University of Texas El Paso | University of Florida | Youngstown State University |

== Scoring ==
The different criteria in the competition that will be judged are:

- Construction Time
- Number of Builders
- Total Weight
- Aggregate Deflection
- Lateral Deflection

These different criteria go into two different formulas to calculate the construction cost and economy cost. There are also penalties that can cause the construction time or weight to increase.

The overall winner has the lowest sum from the construction economy and structural efficiency categories.

== Regional advancement ==
Getting to the National Competition—teams compete at regional conferences around the United States. The top teams from each region are invited to compete at the National Competition each year.

- In a region of 2–6 teams, the top competitor advances to nationals.
- In a region of 7–12 teams, the top two competitors advance to nationals.
- In a region of 13–18 teams, the top three competitors advance to nationals.
- In a region with 19 or more teams, the top four competitors advance to nationals.

== Awards ==
AISC provides award plaques for the top teams at Student Steel Bridge regional Competitions. The top teams at each of the 20 SSBC regional competitions are recognized in seven categories along with the overall winning teams. Top teams at the Student Steel Bridge Competition Finals are recognized with award plaques in eight categories along with the overall winning teams and special award winners.

The categories where students can receive these awards are in:

- Construction Speed
- Lightness
- Aesthetics
- Stiffness
- Cost Estimate
- Economy
- Efficiency
- Overall

The overall winners of the national competition also receive other rewards in addition to there award plaques. The details of these rewards are detailed in the table below.

| Award name | Eligibility | Prize |
|---|---|---|
| John M. Parucki National Champion | This award celebrates the first-place team of the National Competition | $8,000 AISC Student Steel Bridge Competition Scholarship to a student or students of the team's choosing. |
| Second Place Overall | This award celebrates the second-place team of the National Competition | $6,000 AISC Student Steel Bridge Competition Scholarship to a student or students of the team's choosing. |
| Third Place Overall | This award celebrates the third-place team of the National Competition | $4,000 AISC Student Steel Bridge Competition Scholarship to a student or students of the team's choosing. |

== Special awards ==
In addition to the standard award plaques, eligible participating teams may also win special awards that recognize extraordinary achievements. These awards do not factor into the category scores or overall performance rating of a bridge. The following are the special awards currently offered by AISC.

| Award name | Eligibility | Description | Prize |
|---|---|---|---|
| SSBC Team Engagement Award | All teams that compete at a Regional Competition are eligible for this award; participation is not mandatory and will have no effect on scoring and other facets of the competition. | This award recognizes teams that foster equity, diversity, and inclusion. It celebrates formidable teams of smart people who draw from a broad array of backgrounds and experiences. | A team invitation to the National Finals. $2,000 AISC Student Steel Bridge Competition Scholarship to a student or students of the team's choosing. |
| Robert E. Shaw, jr. Spirit of the Competition Award | All teams that compete at the SSBC National Finals are eligible for this award. | The Robert E. Shaw Jr. Spirit of the Competition Award is presented to a team that demonstrates outstanding team camaraderie, professionalism, positive work ethic, and respect for their competition peers. | $2,000 AISC Student Steel Bridge Competition Scholarship to a student or students of the team's choosing. |
| Frank J. Hatfield Ingenuity Award | All teams that compete at the SSBC National Finals are eligible for this award. | The Frank J. Hatfield Ingenuity Award is presented to a team that shows the most engineering ingenuity in the design and/or construction of their bridge based on the requirements of the competition rules. | $2,000 AISC Student Steel Bridge Competition Scholarship to a student or students of the team's choosing. |
| John M. Yadlosky Most Improved Team Award | Eligible teams must have participated (presented for aesthetics judging and staged bridge for construction) in an SSBC regional competition for the past three years. As part of the application, teams will also describe their challenges and how they would plan to use the award funds. | While some teams have access to abundant resources and can learn from a history of success, others may start with very little. The most determined teams will overcome these challenges and take their team's performance to the next level to set a foundation for future success. We’re looking for demonstrated year-over-year improvement of your team's performance and how your team will seek to improve in the future. | One representative from the winning team will be invited to attend the upcoming National Finals and will receive travel reimbursement for their hotel and airfare. $2,000 AISC Student Steel Bridge Competition Scholarship to a student or students of the team's choosing. |
| Video Award | Teams may compete in the optional video award category provided their bridge is presented for aesthetics judging and staged for timed construction at a regional competition. | This optional award category is based on a 6-minute-maximum recording that conveys the features of the bridge, such as incorporating salvaged materials, structural optimization to reduce material, and design for reuse. | The winning video is shown at the National Competition Banquet. |

== See also ==
- List of engineering awards
