= Joan Hodges Queneau Medal =

American engineering award

The Joan Hodges Queneau Medal is an American engineering award for the field of environmental conservation.

It has been given annually since 1976 for an "outstanding contribution by an engineer in behalf of environmental conservation". The award is administered by the National Audubon Society, and made jointly with the American Association of Engineering Societies. The award includes a citation, the "Palladium Medal", and a bronze statue.

== Award recipients ==
- 1977 - H. Beecher Charmbury
- 1983 - Roy W. Hann, Jr.
- 1984 - Barbara-Ann Gamboa Lewis
- 1985 - William A. Jester
- 1986 - Kenneth R. Daniel
- 1987 - Thomas K. MacVicar
- 1988 - Barney L. Capehart
- 1989 - James L. Baker
- 1990 - Joseph T. Ling
- 1991 - M. Kent Loftin
- 1992 - Hsieh Wen Shen
- 1994 - Luna Leopold
- 1995 - Robert Williams
- 1996 - Jared Leigh Cohon
- 2002 - William Carrol
- 2003 - James W. Poirot
- 2004 - Donald Van Norman Roberts
- 2005 - George G. Wicks
- 2008 - Albert A. Grant
- 2010 - Clifford W. Randall
- 2011 - Raymond A. Ferrara
- 2012 - Rao Y. Surampalli
- 2013 - Perry L. McCarty
- 2014 - Bruce E. Rittmann
- 2015 - Diran Apelian
- 2016 - Wendi Goldsmith
- 2017 - Jessica E. Kogel
- 2018 - D. Yogi Goswami

== See also ==
- List of engineering awards
- List of environmental awards
