= National Engineers Week (U.S.) =

American observance in February

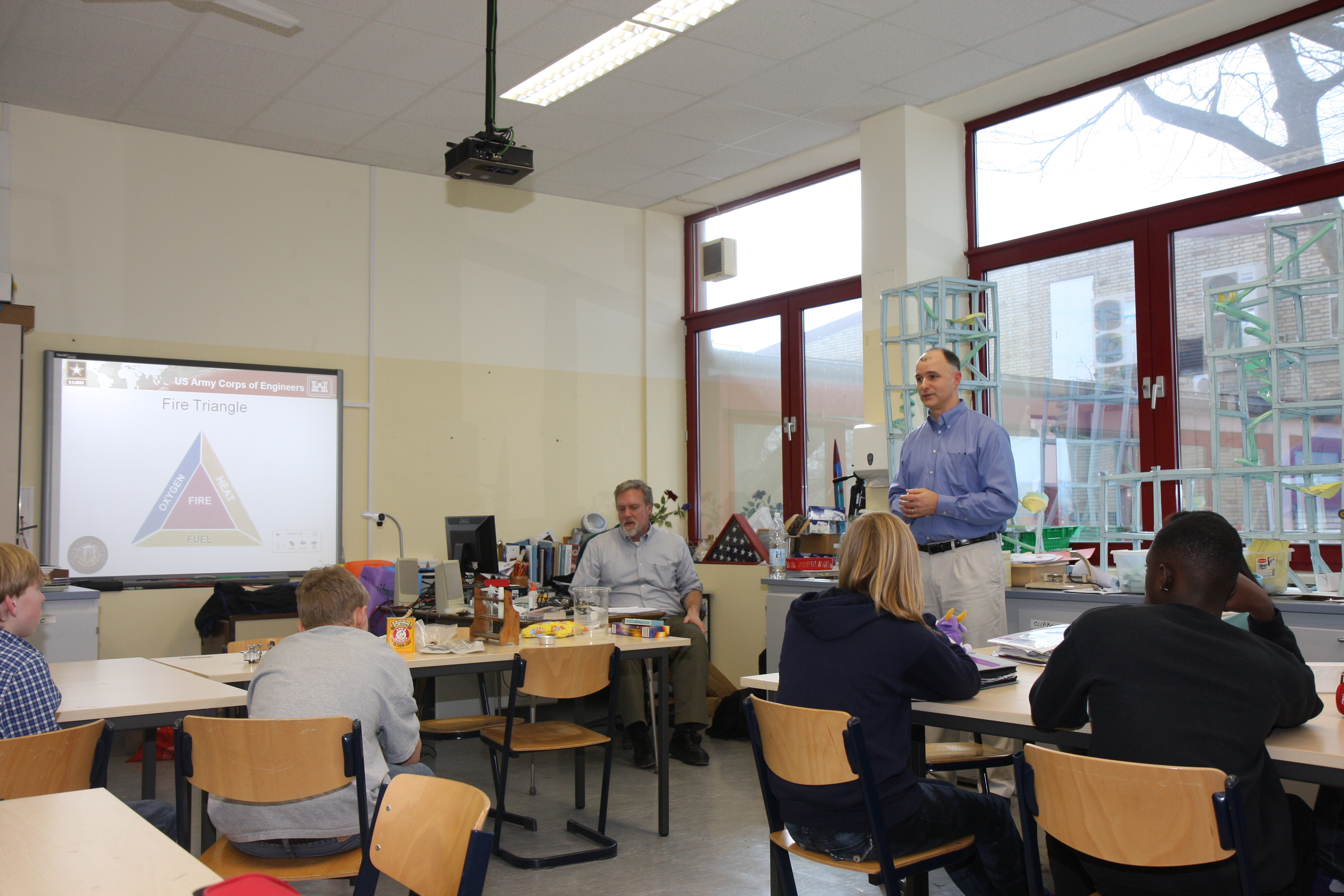
In honor of National Engineers Week 2013 U.S. Army Corps of Engineers Europe District employees present engineering topics to Middle School students in Wiesbaden, Germany.

Engineers Week is one of the largest STEM events of the year in the United States. It is the time to celebrate the amazing accomplishments of engineers, technicians, and technologists and to introduce K-12 students to engineering and technology. National Engineers Week is commemorated by United States federal agencies such as the National Park Service.

5.5 million students are engaged in engineering every year by individual volunteers and educators, engineering and tech companies, universities, museums, libraries, and community organizations at events and activities throughout the US and around the world.

== Themes ==
Every September, DiscoverE (the organization that supports and sustains Engineers Week) releases the annual theme, logo, artwork, planning guides, social media graphics, and new engineering activities for use by the education and engineering community to engage students and celebrate engineers.

=== 2026 Theme: "Transform Your Future" ===
Engineers Week (February 22-28, 2026) is more than a week-long celebration of a profession- it’s a movement to show young people that engineering is creative, collaborative, and most importantly, open to everyone. The 2026 Engineers Week theme, "Transform Your Future," is a powerful reminder that engineering doesn’t just shape our world- it shapes our opportunities, our communities, and the futures we can imagine for ourselves and our children.

== History ==
The celebration of National Engineers Week was started in 1951 by the National Society of Professional Engineers in conjunction with President George Washington's birthday. President Washington is considered as the nation's first engineer, notably for his survey work. Prior to the start of National Engineers Week, the University of Missouri College of Engineering began celebrating the world's first Engineers' Week in 1903, 48 years before the National Society of Professional Engineers, with St. Patrick as the patron saint of engineers.

The results of the Federal Engineer of the Year Award are announced during the week.

=== Dates ===
- 2026 — February 22-28
- 2027 — February 21-27
- 2028 — February 20-26
- 2029 — February 18-24
- 2030 — February 17-23
