= List of protected heritage sites in Flobecq =

This table shows an overview of the protected heritage sites in the Walloon town Flobecq. This list is part of Belgium's national heritage.

Object	Year/architect	Town/section	Address	Coordinates	Number^{?}	Image
Church of Saint-Luc ^{(nl)} ^{(fr)}		Vloesberg		50.737289°N 3.738675°E	51019-CLT-0001-01 Info	Kerk Saint-Luc
Chapel of Saint-Anne ^{(nl)} ^{(fr)}		Vloesberg	rue Saint-Anne	50.758447°N 3.732531°E	51019-CLT-0004-01 Info	Kapel Saint-Anne
Site of Queneau: area of special value ^{(nl)} ^{(fr)}		Vloesberg		50.753304°N 3.704084°E	51019-CLT-0005-01 Info	
Forests of Besoche ^{(nl)} ^{(fr)}		Vloesberg		50.774401°N 3.699680°E	51019-CLT-0006-01 Info	
Plots in forest "Bois de Pottelberg" in "La Houppe" ^{(nl)} ^{(fr)}		Vloesberg		50.768055°N 3.707889°E	51019-CLT-0007-01 Info	
Woodland called "La Houppe" and "Mont de Rhodes" in Flobecq, establishment of conservation ^{(nl)} ^{(fr)}		Vloesberg		50.76671°N 3.70954°E	51019-CLT-0008-01 Info	

== See also ==
- List of protected heritage sites in Hainaut (province)
- Flobecq
