= American Institute of Steel Construction =

American trade association

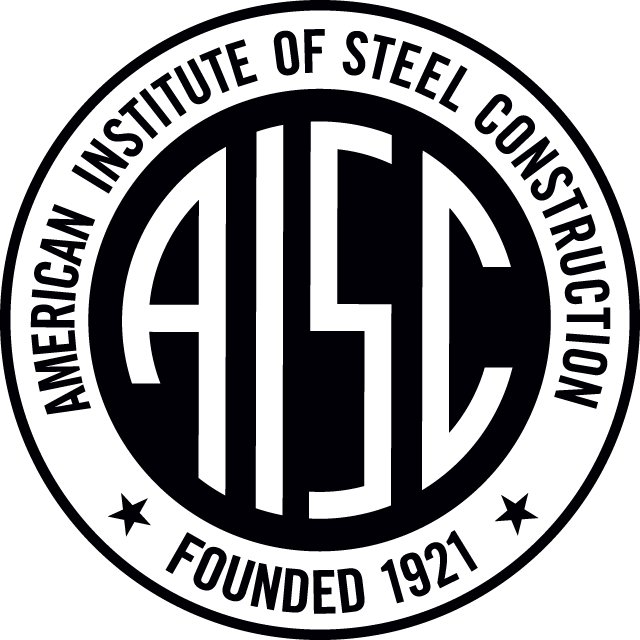
- Logo
- Abbreviation: AISC
- Predecessor: Bridge Builders Society; Structural Steel Society
- Formation: 1921; 105 years ago
- Founded at: Chicago
- Type: Nonprofit; Professional association
- Website: www.aisc.org
- Formerly called: The National Steel Fabricators Association (1919-1921); War Service Committee (1917-1919)

The American Institute of Steel Construction (AISC) is a not-for-profit technical institute and trade association for the use of structural steel in the construction industry of the United States.

AISC publishes the Steel Construction Manual, an authoritative volume on steel building structure design that is referenced in all U.S. building codes.

The organization works with government agencies, policymakers, and other stakeholders to promote policies and regulations that support the industry's growth and development.

== History ==
=== Foundation ===
In 1911, two civil engineering organizations, the Bridge Builders Society and the Structural Steel Society, began cooperating to form broad codes of ethics and practices within the profession. In 1917, during World War I, the two groups merged into the War Service Committee which helped procure fabricated structural steel and coordinate industry efforts. However, by 1919 the Committee was disbanded but some steel fabricators insisted on creating a new association to promote the structural steel industry nationally, founding the National Steel Fabricators Association, which was renamed in 1922 to become the American Institute of Steel Construction, however, the Institute lists 1921 as their foundation year, as that was the year a uniform telegraphic code for the entire industry was created by the National Steel Fabricators Association which triggered the group's transformation from a group of steel manufacturers to the industry standard professional society.

== Publications ==
=== Steel Construction Manual ===
According to the AISC, the Steel Construction Manual is the "premier reference for structural steel design and construction in the United States" having been published since 1927. Editions are usually made every five to six years to keep up with developments in structural steel codes and standards and to incorporate new materials.

Image	Edition	Published	Revisions	Ref.
	1	1927	March 1928, May 1928, December 1928, April 1929, January 1930, April 1930, December 1930, January 1932, October 1932	
	2	1934	January 1934, May 1936, May 1936	
	3	1937	1939, March 1940, 1941	
	4	1941	1942, 1943, 1944, 1945	
	5	1946	1947, 1947, 1947, 1948, 1948, 1948, 1949, 1949, 1950, 1951, 1951, 1952, 1952, 1953, 1954, 1955, 1955, 1956, 1956, 1957, 1957, 1958, 1959, 1959, 1960, 1961, 1961, 1962, 1962	
	6	1963	Four different versions of the first edition exist, each with their own errata, 1965, 1965, 1966, 1967	
	7	1970	1973, 1974, 1975	
	8	1980		
	9			
	10			
	11			
	12			
	13	2005		
	14	2011		
	15	2017		
	16	2023		
