= Outstanding Structure Award =

The Outstanding Structure Award is an award presented by the International Association for Bridge and Structural Engineering to the Engineer, Architect, Contractor, and the Owner in recognition of the most remarkable, innovative, creative or otherwise stimulating structure completed within the last few years.

The Award consists of a Plaque that can be fixed to the winning structure. One or more structures are awarded annually since 2000.

== Recipients ==
Year	Recipients	Image
2021	Beijing Daxing International Airport, Beijing, China	
2021	Rose Fitzgerald Kennedy Bridge, Glenmore, Ireland	
2020	Hong Kong–Zhuhai–Macau Bridge, Hong Kong, Macau, and Zhuhai, China	
2019	Mersey Gateway Bridge, Halton, UK	
2018	Yavuz Sultan Selim Bridge, Istanbul, Turkey	
2017	Phoenix Centre Beijing, China	
2016	Shanghai Tower, Shanghai, China	
2015	New East Span, San Francisco, USA	
2014	Taizhou Yangtze River Bridge, Jiangsu Province, China	
2013	London Velopark, London, United Kingdom	
2012	Estadio Ciudad de La Plata, La Plata, Argentina	
2011	Burj Khalifa Tower, Dubai, United Arab Emirates	
2010	National Aquatics Centre, Beijing, China	
2009	Church of the Most Holy Trinity, Fatima, Portugal	
2009	Three Countries Bridge, Weil am Rhein, Germany, and Huningue, France	
2008	Copenhagen Opera House, Denmark	
2008	Lupu Bridge, Shanghai, China	
2007	The New Roof of the Commerzbank-Arena, Frankfurt, Germany	
2006	Central Bus Station Hamburg, Germany	
2006	Rio-Antirrio bridge, Greece	
2006	Millau Viaduct, France	
2005	Gateshead Millennium Bridge, UK	
2004	Milwaukee Art Museum Addition, Milwaukee, Wisconsin, USA	
2004	Madeira Airport Extension, Madeira Island, Portugal	
2003	Bibliotheca Alexandrina, Alexandria, Egypt	
2003	Bras de la Plaine Bridge, Reunion Island, France	
2002	Miho Museum Bridge, Japan	
2002	Stade de France, Paris, France	
2002	Øresund Bridge, Denmark – Sweden	
2001	Guggenheim Museum Bilbao, Bilbao, Spain	
2001	Sunniberg Bridge, Klosters, Switzerland	
2000	Glass Hall of Leipzig Trade Fair, Germany	
2000	Keyence Corporation Head Office and Laboratory, Osaka, Japan	
