= Human Powered Flight Group =

The Royal Aeronautical Society's Human Powered Flight Group is the governing body responsible for the administration of the Kremer Prizes founded by the late British industrialist Henry Kremer. It was founded in 1959 when the "Man Powered Group" at the College of Aeronautics at Cranfield University became members of the Royal Aeronautical Society. The original title for the group was "Man Powered Group," a moniker that persisted until 1988, when it was revised to "Human Powered Aircraft Group", and subsequently the Human Powered Flight Group.

Currently, there are three outstanding competitions the Human Powered Aircraft Group governs: a 26-mile Marathon course in less than an hour, a sporting aircraft challenge stressing maneuverability, and a challenge that is limited to those aged under 18 in the UK.

The Human Powered Aircraft Group has spawned several other groups, including the Human Powered Aircraft Group at Virginia Tech, founded by Chris Emory and unmanned aerial vehicle designer Imraan Faruque.
