= National Society of Professional Engineers =

US professional association

- Abbreviation: NSPE
- Formation: September 3, 1934
- Type: Professional engineering society
- Headquarters: Alexandria, Virginia
- Official language: English
- Key people: David B. Steinman
- Staff: 30
- Website: nspe.org

The National Society of Professional Engineers (abbreviate as NSPE) is a professional association representing licensed professional engineers in the United States. NSPE is the recognized voice and advocate of licensed Professional Engineers represented in 53 state and territorial societies and over 500 local chapters. The society is based in Alexandria, Virginia.

== History ==
The society was founded in 1934 as a nontechnical organization for licensed professional engineers. The bridge engineer David B. Steinman was its first president and one of the group of professional engineers that established it.

NSPE published Canons of Ethics for Engineers and Rules of Professional Conduct in 1946, which evolved to the current Code of Ethics adopted in 1964. The first fundamental canon is "Hold paramount the safety, health and welfare of the public."

In 1973, NSPE entered into an agreement with the Society of Women Engineers to support efforts to increase the number of women professional engineers.

In 1976, NSPE was the petitioner in National Society of Professional Engineers v. United States, 435 U.S. 679 antitrust case. The United States government brought this antitrust suit against NSPE, claiming that NSPE's ethical canon prohibiting its members from submitting competitive bids for engineering services suppressed competition which was in violation of the Sherman Antitrust Act. NSPE countered with argument for exception under the Rule of Reason. The United States Supreme Court decided against NSPE, allowing the submittal of competitive bids by members thereafter.

== Partners ==
NSPE has founded and works closely with a number of nonprofit organizations and outreach-based activities.

- National Engineers Week was founded in 1951 by NSPE to encourage diversity within engineering and ensure that there would be enough engineers in the future. Different aspects of this event include "Introduce a Girl to Engineering Day", which is designed to overcome the gaps that appear between genders in engineering employment.
- NSPE cofounded the middle school mathematics competition MATHCOUNTS in 1983. More than 350,000 middle school students from across the United States take part in the math-based competition each year.
- NICET (National Institute for Certification in Engineering Technologies) is a division of NSPE.
- NAFE (National Academy of Forensic Engineers) is a chartered affiliate of the NSPE. To qualify to apply as a full member of NAFE, one must be a Professional Engineer as well as a member of NSPE. Becoming a full member also qualifies one as a Board-Certified Forensic Engineer through the Council on Engineering and Scientific Specialty Boards (CESB).
- NSPE awards include the NSPE Award, NSPE Distinguished Service Award, NSPE Young Engineering of the Year Award, QBS Award, Engineering Education Excellence Award, PEGASUS Award, PEPP Award, and the Federal Engineer of the Year Award. In partnership with several other organizations, NSPE sponsors the Washington Award.
- NSPE formerly published the Professional Engineers' Income and Salary Survey but no longer does so.

== See also ==
- Engineering
- Glossary of engineering
- California Society of Professional Engineers
- Engineering ethics
