= American Association of Engineering Societies =

The American Association of Engineering Societies (AAES) is a former umbrella organization of engineering societies in the United States, founded by a group of 43 societies in 1979. After several disputes, and a change in focus in the mid-1980s from speaking for the societies to coordinating between the societies, its membership was reduced to 22 societies by 1993, and 17 societies as of 2015. The AAES dissolved in 2020.
