= International Association for Bridge and Structural Engineering =

Non-profit organisation

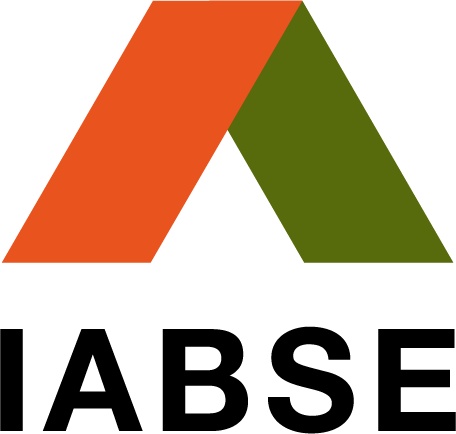
- Abbreviation: IABSE
- Formation: 1929
- Type: NPO & NGO
- Legal status: Active
- Headquarters: Stefano-Franscini-Platz 5
- Location: Zürich, Switzerland
- Region served: World
- Website: iabse.org

The International Association for Bridge and Structural Engineering (IABSE) is a non-profit organisation with mission to promote the exchange of knowledge and to advance the practice of structural engineering worldwide in the service of the profession and society, taking into consideration technical, economic, environmental, aesthetic and social aspects.

== Overview ==
IABSE deals all kinds of structures composed of any kind of material, all phases of the construction process, as well as education and research. The association’s name in French is "Association Internationale des Ponts et Charpentes (AIPC)" and in German "Internationale Vereinigung für Brückenbau und Hochbau (IVBH)“. It was founded in 1929 and has its seat in Zurich. IABSE publishes the quarterly Journal Structural Engineering International SEI, available online via Ingenta.

== Awards ==
The Outstanding Structure Award has been presented annually since 2000. It recognises the most remarkable, innovative, creative, or otherwise stimulating structures completed within the last few years. As a project award, it recognizes the team effort of the engineer, the architect, the contractor, and the owner involved in completion of the project.

The Anton Tedesko Medal is awarded by the IABSE Foundation to honour a Laureate and support a Fellow of the association for study leave for a promising young engineer to gain practical experience in a prestigious engineering firm, outside his/her home country.

== See also ==
- International Association of Engineers
