= Human capital flight =

Emigration of well-trained individuals

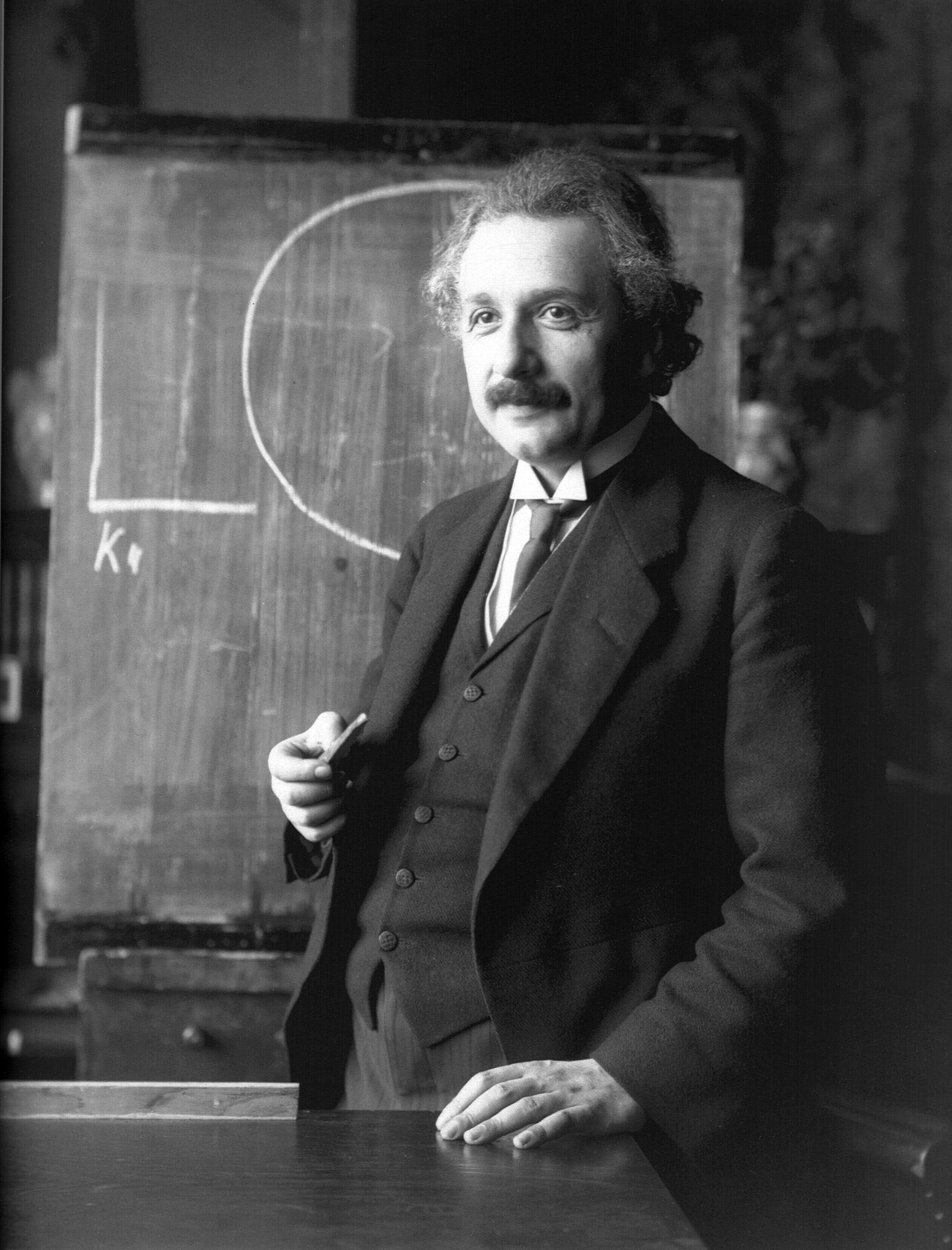
Theoretical physicist Albert Einstein, who emigrated to the United States to escape Nazi persecution, is an example of human capital flight as a result of political change.

Human capital flight is the emigration or immigration of individuals who have received advanced training, especially higher education, in their home country. The net benefits of human capital flight for the receiving country are sometimes called a "brain gain", whereas the net loss for the sending country is called a "brain drain". In occupations with a surplus of graduates, immigration of foreign-trained professionals can worsen the underemployment of domestic graduates, whereas emigration from an area with a surplus of trained people can lead to better opportunities for those remaining. However, emigration may cause problems for the home country if trained people are in short supply there.

Research shows that human capital flight brings significant economic benefits to migrants and the receiving country. The consequences for the country of origin are positive, or mixed. Research also suggests that emigration, remittances and return migration can have a positive effect on democratization and on the quality of political institutions in the country of origin.

== Types ==
There are several types of human capital flight:

- Organizational: The flight of talented and highly qualified employees from large corporations.
- Geographical: The flight of highly trained individuals and college graduates from their area of residence.
- Industrial: The movement of traditionally skilled workers from one sector of an industry to another.

As with other human migration, the social environment is often considered to be a key reason for this population shift. In source countries, lack of opportunities, political instability or oppression, economic depression, health risks and more (push factors) contribute to human capital flight, whereas host countries usually offer rich opportunities, political stability and freedom, a developed economy and better living conditions (pull factors) that attract talent. At the individual level, family influences (relatives living overseas, for example), as well as personal preferences, career ambitions and other motivating factors, can be considered.

== Origins and uses ==
The term "brain drain" was coined by the Royal Society to describe the emigration of "scientists and technologists" to North America from post–World War II Europe. Another source indicates that this term was first used in the United Kingdom to describe the influx of Indian scientists and engineers. Although the term originally referred to technology workers leaving a nation, the meaning has broadened into "the departure of educated or professional people from one country, economic sector, or field for another, usually for better pay or living conditions".

Brain drain is a phenomenon where, relative to the remaining population, a substantial number of more educated (numerate, literate) persons emigrate.

Given that the term "brain drain", as frequently used, implies that skilled emigration is bad for the country of origin, some scholars recommend against using the term in favor of more neutral and scientific alternative terms.

== Effects ==
The positive effects of human capital flight are sometimes referred to as "brain gain" whereas the negative effects are sometimes referred to as "brain drain". According to economist Michael Clemens, it has not been shown that restrictions on high-skill emigration reduce shortages in the countries of origin. According to development economist Justin Sandefur, "there is no study out there... showing any empirical evidence that migration restrictions have contributed to development." Hein de Haas, Professor of Sociology at the University of Amsterdam, describes the brain drain as a "myth", whilst political philosopher Adam James Tebble argues that more open borders aid both the economic and institutional development of poorer migrant sending countries, contrary to proponents of "brain-drain" critiques of migration. However, according to University of Louvain (UCLouvain) economist Frederic Docquier, human capital flight has an adverse effect on most developing countries, even if it can be beneficial for some developing countries. Whether a country experiences a "brain gain" or "brain drain" depends on factors such as composition of migration, level of development, and demographic aspects including its population size, language and geographic location.

=== Economic effects ===
The economic effects of migration are controversial, with some research suggesting that migration (both low- and high-skilled) is beneficial both to the receiving and exporting countries, while other research suggests detrimental effect on the country of origin. According to one study, welfare increases in both types of countries: "welfare impact of observed levels of migration is substantial, at about 5% to 10% for the main receiving countries and about 10% in countries with large incoming remittances". According to economists Michael Clemens and Lant Pratchett, "permitting people to move from low-productivity places to high-productivity places appears to be by far the most efficient generalized policy tool, at the margin, for poverty reduction". A successful two-year in situ anti-poverty program, for instance, helps poor people make in a year what is the equivalent of working one day in the developed world. Research on a migration lottery that allowed Tongans to move to New Zealand found that the lottery winners saw a 263% increase in income from migrating (after only one year in New Zealand) relative to the unsuccessful lottery entrants. A 2017 study of Mexican immigrant households in the United States found that by virtue of moving to the United States, the households increase their incomes more than fivefold immediately. The study also found that the "average gains accruing to migrants surpass those of even the most successful current programs of economic development." A 2024 study found that EU migration to the United States had adverse effects on EU productivity in the short term but positive long-term effects through productivity spillover effects.

Remittances increase living standards in the country of origin. Remittances are a large share of GDP in many developing countries, and have been shown to increase the wellbeing of receiving families. In the case of Haiti, the 670,000 adult Haitians living in the OECD sent home about $1,700 per migrant per year, well over double Haiti's $670 per capita GDP. A study on remittances to Mexico found that remittances lead to a substantial increase in the availability of public services in Mexico, surpassing government spending in some localities. A 2017 study found that remittances can significantly alleviate poverty after natural disasters. Research shows that more educated and higher earning emigrants remit more. Some research shows that the remittance effect is not strong enough to make the remaining natives in countries with high emigration flows better off. A 2016 NBER paper suggests that emigration from Italy due to the 2008 financial crisis reduced political change in Italy.

Return migration can also be a boost to the economy of developing states, as the migrants bring back newly acquired skills, savings and assets. A study of Yugoslav refugees during the Yugoslav Wars of the early 1990s found that citizens of former Yugoslavia who were allowed temporary stays in Germany brought back skills, knowledge and technologies to their home countries when they returned home in 1995 (after the Dayton accords), leading to greater productivity and export performance.

Studies show that the elimination of barriers to migration would have profound effects on world GDP, with estimates of gains ranging between 67 and 147.3%. Research also finds that migration leads to greater trade in goods and services between the sending and receiving countries. Using 130 years of data on historical migrations to the United States, one study finds "that a doubling of the number of residents with ancestry from a given foreign country relative to the mean increases by 4.2 percentage points the probability that at least one local firm invests in that country, and increases by 31% the number of employees at domestic recipients of FDI from that country. The size of these effects increases with the ethnic diversity of the local population, the geographic distance to the origin country, and the ethno-linguistic fractionalization of the origin country." Emigrants have been found to significantly boost Foreign direct investment (FDI) back to their country of origin. According to one review study, the overall evidence shows that emigration helps developing countries integrate into the global economy.

A 2016 study reviewing the literature on migration and economic growth shows that "migrants contribute to the integration of their country into the world market, which can be particularly important for economic growth in developing countries." Some research suggests that emigration causes an increase in the wages of those who remain in the country of origin. A 2014 survey of the existing literature on emigration finds that a 10 percent emigrant supply shock would increase wages in the sending country by 2–5.5%. A study of emigration from Poland shows that it led to a slight increase in wages for high- and medium-skilled workers for remaining Poles. A 2013 study finds that emigration from Eastern Europe after the 2004 EU enlargement increased the wages of remaining young workers in the country of origin by 6%, while it had no effect on the wages of old workers. The wages of Lithuanian men increased as a result of post-EU enlargement emigration. Return migration is associated with greater household firm revenues. A study from the IMF concluded that emigration of high skilled labour from Eastern Europe has adversely affected economic and productivity growth in Eastern Europe and slowed down convergence in per capita income between high and low income EU countries.

A 2019 study in the Journal of Political Economy found that Swedish emigration to the United States during the late 19th and early 20th century strengthened the labour movement and increased left-wing politics and voting trends. The authors argue that the ability to emigrate strengthened the bargaining position of labour, as well as provided exit options for political dissidents who might have been oppressed.

=== Education and innovation ===
Research finds that emigration and low migration barriers has net positive effects on human capital formation and innovation in the sending countries. This means that there is a "brain gain" instead of a "brain drain" to emigration. One study finds that sending countries benefit indirectly in the long-run on the emigration of skilled workers because those skilled workers are able to innovate more in developed countries, which the sending countries are able to benefit on as a positive externality. Greater emigration of skilled workers consequently leads to greater economic growth and welfare improvements in the long-run. According to economist Michael Clemens, it has not been shown that restrictions on high-skill emigration reduce shortages in the countries of origin.

A 2021 study found that migration opportunities for Filipino nurses led to a net increase in human capital in the Philippines, thus contradicting the "brain drain" thesis. A 2017 paper found that the emigration opportunities to the United States for high-skilled Indians provided by the H-1B visa program surprisingly contributed to the growth of the Indian IT sector. A greater number of Indians were induced to enroll in computer science programs in order to move to the United States; however, a large number of these Indians never moved to the United States (due to caps in the H-1B program) or returned to India after the completion of their visas. One 2011 study finds that emigration has mixed effects on innovation in the sending country, boosting the number of important innovations but reducing the number of average inventions. A 2019 paper found that emigration from Fiji led to a net increase in skill stocks in Fiji, as citizens increased their education attainment. A 2019 analysis found that emigration of youths from Italy led to a reduction in innovation. A 2026 study found that migration of Asian workers to the United States to work in the technology sector resulted in boosts to US innovation while also fostering net improvements in skill development and education in Asian countries.

=== Democracy, human rights and liberal values ===
Research also suggests that emigration, remittances and return migration can have a positive effect on political institutions and democratization in the country of origin. Research shows that exposure to emigrants boosts turnout. Research also shows that remittances can lower the risk of civil war in the country of origin. Migration leads to lower levels of terrorism. Return migration from countries with liberal gender norms has been associated with the transfer of liberal gender norms to the home country. A 2009 study finds that foreigners educated in democracies foster democracy in their home countries. Studies find that leaders who were educated in the West are significantly more likely to improve their country's prospects of implementing democracy. A 2016 study found that Chinese immigrants exposed to Western media censored in China became more critical of their home government's performance on the issues covered in the media and less trusting in official discourse. A 2014 study found that remittances decreased corruption in democratic states.

A 2015 study finds that the emigration of women in rural China reduces son preference.

== Historical examples ==
=== Flight of the Neoplatonic academy philosophers ===
After Justinian closed the Platonic Academy in 529 AD, according to the historian Agathias, its remaining members sought protection from the Sassanid ruler, Khosrau I, carrying with them precious scrolls of literature, philosophy and, to a lesser degree, science. After the peace treaty between the Persian and the Byzantine empires in 532 guaranteed their personal security, some members of this group found sanctuary in the Pagan stronghold of Harran, near Edessa. One of the last leading figures of this group was Simplicius, a pupil of Damascius, the last head of the Athenian school. The students of an academy-in-exile may have survived into the ninth century, long enough to facilitate the medieval revival of the Neoplatonist commentary tradition in Baghdad.

=== Spanish expulsion of Jews (15th century) ===
After the end of the Catholic reconquest of Spain, the Catholic Monarchs pursued the goal of a religiously homogenous kingdom. Thus, Jews were expelled from the country in 1492. As they dominated Spain's financial service industry, their expulsion was instrumental in causing future economic problems, for example the need for foreign bankers such as the Fugger family and others from Genova. On 7 January 1492, the King ordered the expulsion of all the Jews from Spain—from the kingdoms of Castile and León (Kingdoms of Galicia, Leon, Old Castile, New Castile or Toledo), Navarra and Aragon (Aragon, Principality of Catalonia, Kingdoms of Valencia, Mallorca and the Rousillon and the two Sicilies). Before that, the Queen had also expelled them from the four Kingdoms of Andalusia (Seville, Cordova, Jaén and Granada). Their departure contributed to economic decline in some regions of Spain.

=== Huguenot exodus from France (17th century) ===
In 1685, Louis XIV revoked the Edict of Nantes and declared Protestantism to be illegal in the Edict of Fontainebleau. After this, many Huguenots (estimates range from 200,000 to 1 million) fled to surrounding Protestant countries: England, the Netherlands, Switzerland, Norway, Denmark and Prussia—whose Calvinist great elector, Frederick William, welcomed them to help rebuild his war-ravaged and under-populated country. Many went to the Dutch colony at the Cape (South Africa), where they were instrumental in establishing a wine industry. At least 10,000 went to Ireland, where they were assimilated into the Protestant minority during the plantations.

Many Huguenots and their descendants prospered. Henri Basnage de Beauval fled France and settled in the Netherlands, where he became an influential writer and historian. Abel Boyer, another noted writer, settled in London and became a tutor to the British royal family. Henry Fourdrinier, the descendant of Huguenot settlers in England, founded the modern paper industry. Augustin Courtauld fled to England, settling in Essex and established a dynasty that founded the British silk industry. Noted Swiss mathematician Gabriel Cramer was born in Geneva to Huguenot refugees. Sir John Houblon, the first Governor of the Bank of England, was born into a Huguenot family in London. Sir Henry Bessemer, inventor of the Bessemer Process, was born into a family of Huguenot refugees in England. Isaac Barré, the son of Huguenot settlers in Ireland, became an influential British soldier and politician. Gustav and Peter Carl Fabergé, the descendants of Huguenot refugees, founded the world-famous Fabergé company in Russia, maker of the famous Faberge eggs.

The exodus of Huguenots from France created a brain drain, as Huguenots accounted for a disproportionate number of entrepreneurial, artisan and technical occupations in the country. The loss of this technical expertise was a blow from which the kingdom did not fully recover for many years.

=== Expulsion of the Jesuits ===
The suppression of the Society of Jesus in Spanish America in 1767 caused the Jesuit vineyards in Peru to be auctioned at high prices, but new owners did not have the same expertise as the Jesuits, contributing to a production decline.

Also, after the suppression, the production and importance of yerba mate-producing regions, which had been dominated by Jesuits, began to decline. Excessive exploitation of indigenous labour in the plantations led to decay in the industry and the scattering of Guaranís living in the missions. With the fall of the Jesuits, and the mismanagement of their former enterprises by the crown and the new entrepreneurs that had taken over, Paraguay gained an unrivalled position as the main producer of yerba mate. The plantation system of the Jesuits did prevail, however, and mate continued chiefly to be harvested from wild stand through the 18th century and most of the 19th century.

=== 19th century Eastern Europe migration ===
Mid-19th century Eastern European migration was significantly shaped by religious factors. The Jewish minority experienced strong discrimination in the Russian Empire during this period, which reached its maximum in the pogrom waves of the 1880s. During the 1880s, the mass exodus of more than two million Russian Jews began. Already before, a migration stream of Jewish people started which was characterized by highly skilled individuals. This pronounced selectivity was not caused by economic incentives, but by political persecution. A large number of Nobel Prize winners were descendants of the people ejected by pogroms who emigrated to the United States and the United Kingdom.

=== Antisemitism in pre-World War II Europe (1933–1943) ===
Antisemitic sentiments and laws in Europe through the 1930s and 1940s, culminating in the Holocaust, caused an exodus of intelligentsia. Notable examples are:

- Albert Einstein (emigrated permanently to the United States in 1933)
- Sigmund Freud (finally decided to emigrate permanently with his wife and daughter to London, England, in 1938, two months after the Anschluss)
- Enrico Fermi (1938; though he was not Jewish himself, his wife, Laura, was)
- Niels Bohr (1943; his mother was Jewish)
- Theodore von Karman
- John von Neumann (Hungarian, Roman Catholic convert)
- Hans Bethe
- Emmy Noether
- Leo Szilard
- Hannah Arendt (first fled to Paris from 1933, and eventually emigrated to the United States in 1940)
- Walter Benjamin
- Theodore Adorno
- Max Horkheimer

Besides Jews, Nazi persecution extended to liberals and socialists in Germany, further contributing to emigration. Refugees in New York City founded the University in Exile. The most prolific research center in maths and physics before the war was the German University of Göttingen, that became a focal point for the Nazi crackdown on "Jewish physics", as represented by the work of Albert Einstein. In what was later called the "great purge" of 1933, academics were expelled or fled, ending up in the United States, Canada and the United Kingdom. Following the great purge, the Institute for Advanced Study in Princeton took on the role of leading research institution in maths and physics.

The Bauhaus, perhaps the most important arts and design school of the 20th century, was forced to close down during the Nazi regime because of their liberal and socialist leanings, which the Nazis considered degenerate. The school had already been shut down in Weimar because of its political stance, but moved to Dessau prior to the closing. Following this abandonment, two of the three pioneers of modern architecture, Mies van der Rohe and Walter Gropius, left Germany for America (while Le Corbusier stayed in France). They introduced the European Modern movement to the American public and fostered the International Style in architecture and design, helping to transform design education at American universities and influencing later architects. A 2014 study in the American Economic Review found that German Jewish Émigrés in the US boosted innovation there.

The resulting wave of high-skilled immigration greatly bolstered up the scientific development of the United Kingdom and United States of America. As a result of Nazi intellectual purges, the Anglosphere replaced Germany as the world's scientific leader. German historian Michael Grüttner stated that the "German universities suffered a loss of 20.5% of their teaching staff" after the Nazi seizure of power. He estimates that about 70% of fired scientists lost their position because of Jewish or "non-Aryan" ancestry, 10% lost their position because they were married to a Jew, and 20% were fired for political reasons. As over 60% of fired scientists emigrated, Grüttner argues that Germany lost even more than the sheer number of dismissed scientists would suggest as top scientists were disproportionately represented among the emigrees. When taking into consideration both those who won Nobel Prize either before or after emigration, a total of 24 Nobel laureates fled either Germany or Austria because of Nazi persecution.

Many Jews escaping from German-occupied Europe to the United Kingdom established successful careers in publishing, medicine, science, psychoanalysis and other occupations. Notable scientists include Max Perutz, Rudolf Peierls, Francis Simon, Ernst Boris Chain and Hans Adolf Krebs. Intellectuals include art historians Nikolaus Pevsner and Ernst Gombrich, sociologists Norbert Elias and Karl Mannheim, and philosophers Karl Popper and Ludwig Wittgenstein.

=== Hungarian scientists in the early and mid 20th century ===
Different waves of emigration occurred.

Before World War I: József Galamb, engineer and creator of T-Ford; Eugene Farkas, engineer and creator of Fordson tractor; Philipp Lenard (Nobel prize/physics)

- First and biggest wave was around World War I.
- Then after Trianon 1920 when Hungary lost two-thirds of its territory: Mária Telkes, István Szabó (engineer/physicist), Hans Selye
- World War II and the Third Reich
- Soviet occupation and communist occupation around 1948 and then revolution of 1956

During the 1930s and 1940s Hungarian was the third-most-often-used language in Hollywood.

"The Martians" were a group of prominent Hungarian scientists of Jewish descent (mostly, but not exclusively, physicists and mathematicians) who escaped to the United States during and after World War II due to Nazism or Communism. They included, among others, Theodore von Kármán, John von Neumann, Paul Halmos, Eugene Wigner, Edward Teller, George Pólya, John G. Kemeny and Paul Erdős. Several were from Budapest, and were instrumental in American scientific progress (e.g., developing the atomic bomb). Many more left because of communism: Hungarian Nobel-prize winners: György von Békésy, Szent-Györgyi, Harsányi and Hersko and others like Viktor Szebehely, Zoltán Bay, Alexandre Lamfalussy (economist), Mihaly Csikszentmihaly (Flow)

- After the revolution of 1956 many left: Ferenc Pavlics (engineer) creator of the Lunar Roving Vehicle, Imre Izsák, Oláh György (Nobel prize/chemistry), Csaba Horváth (chemical engineer) and parents of Nick Szabo (Bitcoin)

The process didn't stop, since the region that used to be the Western Block quickly recovered from the economic crisis caused by the World War and stabilized as reconstruction was completed so the bulk of businesses and capital flocked there, creating a systematic barrier.

=== German scientist recruitment by the US and USSR post World War II ===
In the last months of and post World War II, both the American and Soviet governments forcibly recruited and transported thousands of former Nazi scientists to the US and USSR respectively to continue their scientific work in those countries.

=== Eastern Europe under the Eastern Bloc ===
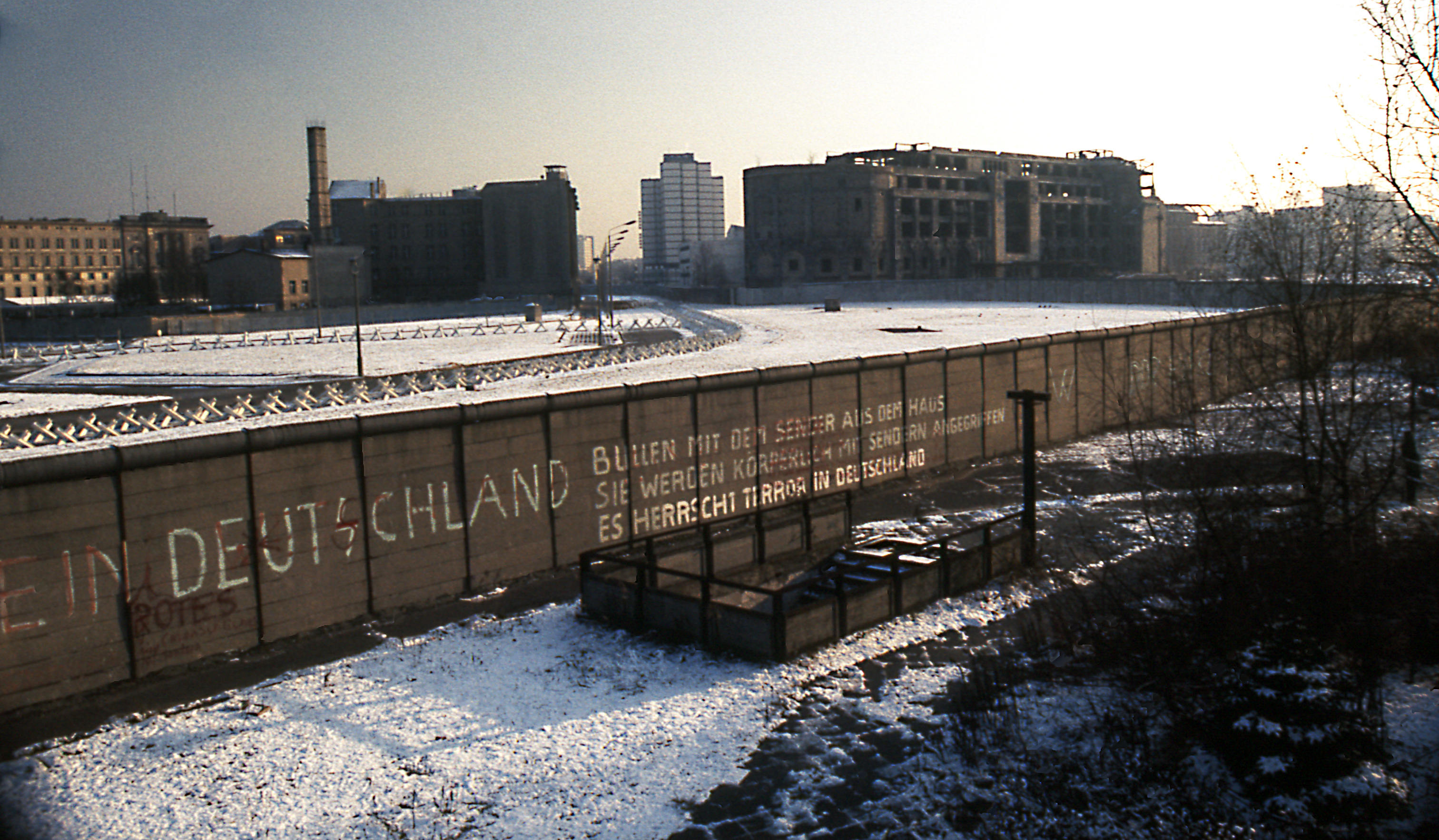
Berlin Wall in November 1975

By 1922, the Soviet Union had issued restrictions making emigration of its citizens to other countries almost impossible. Soviet Premier Nikita Khrushchev later stated, "We were scared, really scared. We were afraid the thaw might unleash a flood, which we wouldn't be able to control and which could drown us. How could it drown us? It could have overflowed the banks of the Soviet riverbed and formed a tidal wave which would have washed away all the barriers and retaining walls of our society." After Soviet occupation of Eastern Europe at the end of World War II, the majority of those living in the countries of the Eastern Bloc aspired to independence and wanted the Soviets to leave. By the early 1950s, the approach of the Soviet Union to restricting emigration was emulated by most of the rest of the Eastern Bloc, including East Germany.

Even after the official closing of the Inner German border in 1952, the border between the sectors of East Berlin and West Berlin remained considerably more accessible than the rest of the border because it was administered by all four occupying powers. The Berlin sector border was essentially a "loophole" through which Eastern Bloc citizens could still emigrate. The 3.5 million East Germans, called Republikflüchtlinge, who had left by 1961 totalled approximately 20% of the entire East German population. The emigrants tended to be young and well educated, leading to the brain drain feared by officials in East Germany. Yuri Andropov, then the CPSU director of Relations with Communist and Workers' Parties of Socialist Countries, decided on 28 August 1958 to write an urgent letter to the Central Committee about the 50% increase in the number of East German intelligentsia among the refugees. Andropov reported that, while the East German leadership stated that they were leaving for economic reasons, testimony from refugees indicated that the reasons were more political than material. He stated, "the flight of the intelligentsia has reached a particularly critical phase." The direct cost of labour force losses has been estimated at $7 billion to $9 billion, with East German party leader Walter Ulbricht later claiming that West Germany owed him $17 billion in compensation, including reparations as well as labour force losses. In addition, the drain of East Germany's young population potentially cost it over 22.5 billion marks in lost educational investment. In August 1961, East Germany erected a barbed-wire barrier that would eventually be expanded by construction into the Berlin Wall, effectively closing the loophole.

== By region ==
=== Europe ===
Human capital flight in Europe fits into two distinct trends. The first is an outflow of highly qualified scientists from Western Europe mostly to the United States. The second is a migration of skilled workers from Central and Southeastern Europe into Western Europe, within the EU. While in some countries the trend may be slowing, certain South European countries such as Italy continue to experience extremely high rates of human capital flight. The European Union has noted a net loss of highly skilled workers and introduced a "blue card" policy—much like the American green card—which "seeks to draw an additional 20 million workers from Asia, Africa and the Americas in the next two decades".

Although the EU recognizes a need for extensive immigration to mitigate the effects of an aging population, national populist political parties have gained support in many European countries by calling for stronger laws restricting immigration. Immigrants are perceived both as a burden on the state and the cause of social problems such as increased crime rates and the introduction of major cultural differences.

The EU lags significantly behind the US and China in venture capital investments, with the EU capturing only 5% of global venture capital compared to 52% in the US and 40% in China. A high percentage of EU scale-ups involve foreign lead investors, and many end up being acquired by foreign entities or listed on foreign stock exchanges. This trend contributes to a brain drain and the relocation of innovative firms outside the EU. Promising companies and talent to relocate overseas. This undermines the local business environment and hampers Europe's capacity to retain industry leaders and foster new technological advancements.

==== Western Europe ====
In 2006, over 250,000 Europeans emigrated to the United States (164,285), Australia (40,455), Canada (37,946) and New Zealand (30,262). Germany alone saw 155,290 people leave the country (though mostly to destinations within Europe). This is the highest rate of worker emigration since reunification, and was equal to the rate in the aftermath of World War II. Portugal has experienced the largest human capital flight in Western Europe. The country has lost 19.5% of its qualified population and is struggling to absorb sufficient skilled immigrants to compensate for losses to Australia, Canada, Switzerland, Germany, the United Kingdom and Austria.

A 2026 study by DataPulse Research, drawing on Eurostat place-of-birth migration data across 19 European countries, found that 17 of the 19 lost more native-born residents than they regained in 2024. Germany recorded the largest absolute net loss at approximately 91,000 native-born emigrants, followed by Italy at around 65,000 and Spain at around 32,000. Only Bulgaria and Lithuania recorded a positive native-born net balance, reversals the study attributed to sustained economic growth. The analysis also noted that citizenship-based statistics can diverge from birthplace-based figures: Spain's official citizenship balance was +6,616 in 2024, while its native-born (place-of-birth) balance was −31,548, a gap driven by naturalized, foreign-born citizens counted under the citizenship metric.

==== United Kingdom ====
In December 2020, the UK left the European Union following a 2016 referendum in what is known as Brexit. European Union Business industries expressed worries that Brexit poses significant risk of causing brain drain. Data on academics has shown that since the 2016 Brexit referendum there have been mixed results based on country of origin. British scholars have increasingly returned to the UK and decreasingly left the UK. However, more EU scholars have left the UK and less have entered the UK. Other foreign scholars have seen decreases in both entering and exiting. This suggests that in overall academia, the UK has experienced a decrease in brain circulation rather than significant brain drain or brain gain.

The effects of Brexit after its official implementation in 2020, along with recent conservative immigration policy, has caused significant brain drain in the work force. Though net migration boomed in the aftermath of COVID-19, it fell to 204,000 in June 2025, below pre-Covid levels, with 90% of emigrants of working age.

==== Central and Eastern Europe ====
Central and Eastern European countries have expressed concerns about extensive migration of skilled labourers to Ireland and the United Kingdom following the creation of the Schengen Agreement. Lithuania, for example, has lost about 100,000 citizens since 2003, many of them young and well-educated, to emigration to Ireland in particular. (Ireland itself previously experienced high rates of human capital flight to the United States, Great Britain and Canada before the Celtic Tiger economic programs.) A similar phenomenon occurred in Poland after its entry into the European Union. In the first year of its EU membership, 100,000 Poles registered to work in England, joining an estimated 750,000 residents of Polish descent. However, with the rapid growth of salaries in Poland, its booming economy, the strong value of the zloty, and decreasing unemployment (which fell from 14.2% in May 2006 to 8% in March 2008), the flight of Polish workers slowed. In 2008 and early 2009 people who came back outnumbered those leaving the country. The exodus is likely to continue, however. According to IMF, the emigration of high skilled labour has adversely affected growth in Eastern Europe and slowed down convergence in per capita income between high and low income EU countries.

==== Russia ====
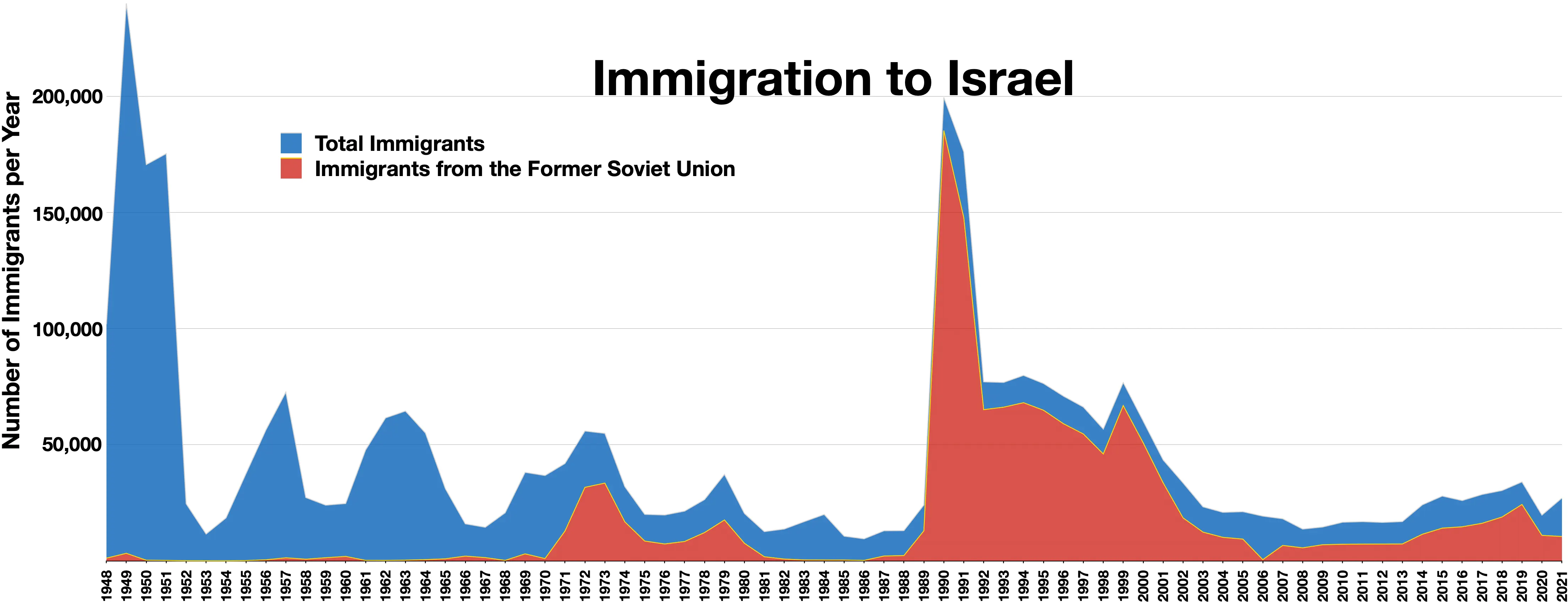
Immigration to Israel in the 1990s post-Soviet aliyah led to the Yozma program to kick start venture capital and take advantage of the immigration talent. Total immigrants Immigrants from the USSR and post-Soviet states

More than 500,000 Russian scientists and computer programmers left the country during the 1990s, following the collapse of the Soviet Union.

After Russia invaded Ukraine in February 2022, there was a major exodus of skilled workers and potential draftees. Most international companies operating in Russia departed, taking their skilled experts with them. Studies report that this would have a demographic effect especially in Russia lasting much longer than the conflict will take place, and much longer than Vladimir Putin will remain president.

The invasion of Ukraine in 2022 caused tens of thousands of tech workers to flee Russia. In 2024, the website of the science journal Science stated that Russia experienced a multi-year brain drain in the science profession. In 2024, the London Business School indicated that Russia's brain drain has become its economy's biggest problem.

According to BBC News:

They come from different walks of life. Some are journalists like us, but there are also IT experts, designers, artists, academics, lawyers, doctors, PR specialists, and linguists. Most are under 50. Many share western liberal values and hope Russia will be a democratic country one day. Some are LGBTQ+. Sociologists studying the current Russian emigration say there is evidence that those leaving are younger, better educated and wealthier than those staying. More often they are from bigger cities.

According to Johannes Wachs, "The exodus of skilled human capital, sometimes called brain drain, out of Russia may have a significant effect on the course of the war and the Russian economy in the long run."

==== Southeastern Europe ====
The rapid but small-scale departure of highly skilled workers from Southeastern Europe has caused concern about those nations developing deeper integration in the European Union. This has given rise to programs to curb the outflow by encouraging skilled technicians and scientists to remain in the region to work on international projects.

Serbia is one of the top countries that has experienced human capital flight due to the fall of Yugoslavia and its successive civil wars. In 1991, people started emigrating to Italy and Greece, and then began going farther, to the United Kingdom, Canada and the United States. In the last ten years, educated people and professionals have been leaving the country and going to other countries where they feel they can have improved possibilities for better and secure lives. According to a report on "migration and brain drain" in the Western Balkans, published in 2024, "young people leave these countries not only because of low salaries and economic issues but also because of corruption, crime, political instability and lack of security."

A major cause of human capital flight in countries like Moldova and Ukraine is lack of economic opportunities and corruption. The higher economic class in the country, filled with local and Russian oligarchs, has control over the whole economic system. Young, educated people have few economic opportunities unless they have connections to individuals from the higher class. This encourages them to emigrate and seek opportunities elsewhere.

==== Greece ====
While Greece experienced a significant "brain drain" during its financial crisis, with an estimated 600,000 professionals emigrating, a noticeable reversal—termed "brain gain"—has emerged in recent years. According to Eurostat data from 2025, approximately 350,000 of the 600,000 Greeks who left between 2010 and 2021 have since returned.

The country's net migration balance turned positive in 2023 for the first time since 2008. Official figures from the Hellenic Statistical Authority (ELSTAT) reported a net migration of +42,658, resulting from 118,816 arrivals versus 76,158 departures.

Key drivers for this reversal include strong economic growth and targeted government policies. These incentives feature a notable 50% income tax cut for seven years for repatriating professionals, a measure that has already benefited around 6,000 individuals. Additionally, targeted initiatives such as the Rebrain Greece platform have been established to connect returning talent with the domestic job market.

==== Greece, Ireland, Italy, Portugal and Spain ====
Many citizens of the countries most stricken by the economic crisis in Europe have emigrated to countries such as Australia, Brazil, Germany, the United Kingdom, Mexico, Chile, Ecuador, Angola and Argentina.

=== Africa ===
Countries in Africa have lost a tremendous amount of their educated and skilled populations as a result of emigration to more developed countries, which has harmed the ability of such nations to climb out of poverty. Nigeria, Kenya and Ethiopia are believed to be the most affected. According to the United Nations Development Programme, Ethiopia lost 75% of its skilled workforce between 1980 and 1991.

Then South African Deputy President Thabo Mbeki said in his 1998 "African Renaissance" speech:

"In our world in which the generation of new knowledge and its application to change the human condition is the engine which moves human society further away from barbarism, do we not have need to recall Africa's hundreds of thousands of intellectuals back from their places of emigration in Western Europe and North America, to rejoin those who remain still within our shores!

I dream of the day when these, the African mathematicians and computer specialists in Washington and New York, the African physicists, engineers, doctors, business managers and economists, will return from London and Manchester and Paris and Brussels to add to the African pool of brain power, to enquire into and find solutions to Africa's problems and challenges, to open the African door to the world of knowledge, to elevate Africa's place within the universe of research the information of new knowledge, education and information."

Africarecruit is a joint initiative by NEPAD and the Commonwealth Business Council to recruit professional expatriate Africans to take employment back in Africa after working overseas.

In response to growing debate over the human capital flight of healthcare professionals, especially from lower-income countries to some higher-income countries, in 2010 the World Health Organization adopted the Global Code of Practice on the International Recruitment of Health Personnel, a policy framework for all countries for the ethical international recruitment of doctors, nurses and other health professionals.

African human capital flight has begun to reverse itself due to rapid growth and development in many African nations, and the emergence of an African middle class. Between 2001 and 2010, six of the world's ten fastest-growing economies were in Africa, and between 2011 and 2015, Africa's economic growth was expected to outpace that of Asia. This, together with increased development, introduction of technologies such as faster internet access and mobile phones, a better-educated population, and the environment for business driven by new tech start-up companies, has resulted in many expatriates from Africa returning to their home countries, and more Africans staying at home to work.

==== Ghana ====
The trend for young doctors and nurses to seek higher salaries and better working conditions, mainly in higher-income countries of the West, is having serious effects on the health care sector in Ghana. Ghana currently has about 3,600 doctors—one for every 6,700 inhabitants. This compares with one doctor per 430 people in the United States. Many of the country's trained doctors and nurses leave to work in countries such as Britain, the United States, Jamaica and Canada. It is estimated that up to 68% of the country's trained medical staff left between 1993 and 2000, and according to Ghana's official statistics institute, in the period 1999 to 2004, 448 doctors, or 54% of those trained in the period, left to work abroad.

==== South Africa ====
Along with many African nations, South Africa has been experiencing human capital flight in the past 20 years, since the end of apartheid. This is believed to be potentially damaging for the regional economy, and is arguably detrimental to the wellbeing of the region's impoverished majority, which is desperately reliant on the health care infrastructure because of the HIV/AIDS epidemic. The skills drain in South Africa tends to reflect racial contours exacerbated by Black Economic Empowerment policies, and has thus resulted in large White South African communities abroad. The problem is further highlighted by South Africa's request in 2001 of Canada to stop recruiting its doctors and other highly skilled medical personnel.

For the medical sector, the loss of return from investment for all doctors emigrating from South Africa is $1.41 billion. The benefit to destination countries is huge: $2.7 billion for the United Kingdom alone, without compensation.

More recently, in a case of reverse brain drain a net 359,000 highly skilled South Africans returned to South Africa from foreign work assignments over a five-year period from 2008 to 2013. This was catalysed by the 2008 financial crisis and perceptions of a higher quality of life in South Africa relative to the countries to which they had first emigrated. It is estimated that around 37% of those who returned are professionals such as lawyers, doctors, engineers and accountants.

=== Asia ===
==== Middle East ====
===== Arab world =====
By 2010, the Arab countries were experiencing human capital flight, according to reports from the United Nations and Arab League. About one million Arab experts and specialists were living in developed countries, and the rate of return was extremely low. The reasons for this included attraction to opportunities in technical and scientific fields in the West and an absence of job opportunities in the Arab world, as well as wars and political turmoil that have plagued many Arab nations.

In 2012, human capital flight was showing signs of reversing, with many young students choosing to stay and more individuals from abroad returning. In particular, many young professionals are becoming entrepreneurs and starting their own businesses rather than going abroad to work for companies in Western countries. This was partially a result of the Arab Spring, after which many Arab countries began viewing science as the driving force for development, and as a result stepped up their science programs. Another reason may be the ongoing global recession.

====== Iraq ======
During the Iraq War, especially during the early years, the lack of basic services and security fed an outflow of professionals from Iraq that began under Saddam Hussein, under whose rule four million Iraqis are believed to have left the country. In particular, the exodus was fed by the violence that plagued Iraq, which by 2006 had seen 89 university professors and senior lecturers killed.

===== Iran =====
In In 2006, the International Monetary Fund (IMF) ranked Iran "first in brain drain among 61 developing and less developed countries (LDCs)". In the early 1990s, more than 150,000 Iranians emigrated, and an estimated 25% of Iranians with post-secondary education were residing in developed countries of the OECD. 2009, the IMF reported that 150,000–180,000 Iranians emigrate annually, with up to 62% of Iran's academic elite having emigrated, and that the yearly exodus is equivalent to an annual capital loss of $50 billion. Better possibilities for job markets is thought to be the motivation for absolute majority of the human capital flight while a small few stated their reasons as in search of more social or political freedom.

===== Israel =====
Israel has experienced varying levels of emigration throughout its history, with the majority of Israeli expatriates moving to the United States. Currently, some 330,000 native-born Israelis (including 230,000 Israeli Jews) are estimated to be living abroad, while the number of immigrants to Israel who later left is unclear. According to public opinion polls, the main motives for leaving Israel have not been the political and security situation, but include desire for higher living standards, pursuit of work opportunities and/or professional advancement, and higher education. Many Israelis with degrees in scientific or engineering fields have emigrated abroad, largely due to lack of job opportunities. From Israel's establishment in May 1948 to December 2006, about 400,000 doctors and academics left Israel. In 2009, Israel's Council for Higher Education informed the Knesset's Education Committee that 25% of Israel's academics were living overseas, and that Israel had the highest human capital flight rate in the world. However, an OECD estimate put the highly educated Israeli emigrant rate at 5.3 per 1,000 highly educated Israelis, meaning that Israel actually retains more of its highly educated population than many other developed countries.

In addition, the majority of Israelis who emigrate eventually return after extended periods abroad. In 2007, the Israeli government began a program to encourage Israelis living abroad to return; since then, the number of returning Israelis has doubled, and in 2010, Israeli expatriates, including academics, researchers, technical professionals and business managers, began returning in record numbers. The country launched additional programs to open new opportunities in scientific fields to encourage Israeli scientists and researchers living abroad to return home. These initiatives have since succeeded in luring many Israeli scientists back home.

===== Turkey =====
In the 1960s, many skilled and educated people emigrated from Turkey, including many doctors and engineers. This emigration wave is believed to have been triggered by political instability, including the 1960 military coup. In later decades, into the 2000s, many Turkish professionals emigrated, and students studying overseas chose to remain abroad, mainly due to better economic opportunities. This human capital flight was given national media attention, and in 2000, the government formed a task force to investigate the "brain drain" problem.

According to Turkey's national statistics agency, TÜİK, the emigration ("brain drain") rate among higher-education graduates rose from 1.6% in 2015 to 2.0% in 2024, and was higher among male graduates (2.4%) than female graduates (1.6%). Rates were markedly higher among graduates of private ("foundation") universities (4.3%) than state universities (1.7%), and highest among graduates of information and communication technology programmes (6.7%), followed by engineering, manufacturing and construction (4.4%).

Top destination countries for Turkish higher-education graduates, 2024
| Country | Share |
|---|---|
| United States | 19.6% |
| Germany | 19.4% |
| United Kingdom | 11.3% |
| Netherlands | 7.0% |
| Canada | 5.2% |

==== Southeast Asia ====
===== Indonesia =====
While there is no empirical data about human capital flight from Indonesia, the brain drain phenomenon in Indonesia was estimated to reach 5%. After the May 1998 riots of Indonesia, many Chinese Indonesians decided to flee to other countries such as Singapore, Malaysia, Taiwan, Australia, the Netherlands, and the United States which severely contributes to brain drain within the country. Indonesian Aerospace laid off some two thirds of its workforce after the 1997 Asian financial crisis, leading many workers to leave their country to find a better career overseas. As of 2018, there are at least 60 Indonesians graduated from local or overseas universities working at Boeing and Airbus, with half of them holding middle management positions.

In 2023, it was reported that over 4,000 Indonesians acquired Singaporean citizenship between 2019 and 2022. Most of these are young people, students in the ages 25 – 35 and degree holders. The main reasons given were better job prospects, scholarships, better healthcare, higher salaries and a good public transport.

In addition, 413 of the 35,536 recipients of the state and tax funded Indonesia Endowment Fund for Education (LPDP) did not return to Indonesia between 2013 and 2022. They were required to return and work in Indonesia for several years after they concluded their studies.

===== Malaysia =====
There have been high rates of human capital flight from Malaysia. Major pull factors have included better career opportunities abroad and compensation, while major push factors included corruption, social inequality, educational opportunities, racial inequality such as the government's Bumiputera affirmative action policies. As of 2011, Bernama has reported that there are a million talented Malaysians working overseas. Recently human capital flight has increased in pace: 305,000 Malaysians migrated overseas between March 2008 and August 2009, compared to 140,000 in 2007. Non-Bumiputeras, particularly Malaysian Indians and Malaysian Chinese, were over-represented in these statistics. Popular destinations included Singapore, Australia and the United Kingdom. This is reported to have caused Malaysia's economic growth rate to fall to an average of 4.6% per annum in the 2000s compared to 7.2% in the 1990s.

===== Philippines =====
====== Post-colonial Philippines ======
In 1946, colonialism in the Philippines ended with the election of Manuel Roxas. The Philippines' infrastructure and economy had been devastated by World War II, contributing to serious national health problems and uneven distribution of wealth. As part of reconstruction efforts for the newly independent state, education of nurses was encouraged to combat the low ratio of 1 nurse per 12,000 Filipinos and to help raise national health care standards. However Roxas, having spent his last three years as the secretary of finance and chairman of the National Economic Council and a number of other Filipino companies, was particularly concerned with the country's financial (rather than health) problems. The lack of government funding for rural community clinics and hospitals, as well as low wages, continued to perpetuate low retention rates for nurses in rural areas and slow economic recovery. When the United States relaxed their Immigration Act laws in 1965, labour export emerged as a possible solution for the Philippines.

====== Labour export from the 1960s onwards ======
Since the 1960s and 1970s, the Philippines has been the largest supplier of nurses to the United States, in addition to export labour supplied to the UK and Saudi Arabia. In 1965, with a recovering post-WWII economy and facing labour shortages, the United States introduced a new occupational clause to the Immigration Act. The clause encouraged migration of skilled labour into sectors experiencing a shortage, particularly nursing, as well relaxing restrictions on race and origin. This was seen as an opportunity for mass labour exportation by the Philippine government, and was followed by a boom in public and private nursing educational programs. Seeking access through the Exchange Visitors Program (EVP) sponsored by the US government, workers were encouraged to go abroad to learn more skills and earn higher pay, sending remittance payments back home. As nursing was a highly feminized profession, labour migrants through the beginning of the 1980s were predominantly female and young (25–30 years of age).

Pursuing economic gains through labour migration over infrastructural financing and improvement, the Philippines still faced slow economic growth during the 1970s and 1980s. With continuously rising demand for nurses in the international service sector and overseas, the Philippine government aggressively furthered their educational programs under Ferdinand Marcos, president at the time. Although complete statistical data are difficult to collect, studies done in the 1970s show 13,500 nurses (or 85% of all Filipino nurses) had left the country to pursue work elsewhere. Additionally, the number of existing public and private nursing school programs multiplied from a reported 17 nursing schools in 1950, to 140 nursing schools in 1970.

====== Remittances ======
Studies show stark wage discrepancies between the Philippines and developed countries such as the US and the UK. This has led Philippine government officials to note that remittances sent home may be seen as more economically valuable than pursuit of local work. Around the turn of the 20th century, the average monthly wage of Filipino nurses who remained in their home country was between 550–1,000 pesos per month (roughly US$70–140 at that time). In comparison, the average nurse working in the US was receiving US$800–400 per month.

However, scholars have noted that economic disparities in the Philippines have not been eased in the past decades. Although remittance payments account for a large portion of Filipino GDP (US$290.5 million in 1978, increased to US$10.7 billion in 2005), and are therefore regarded as a large economic boost to the state, Filipino unemployment has continued to rise (8.4% in 1990, increased to 12.7% in 2003). Here scholars have begun to look at the culture of nurse migration endorsed by the Philippine state as a contributing factor to the country's economic and health problems.

====== Education industry ======
In addition to the Philippine Overseas Employment Administration (POEA) run by the government that serves as both a source of overseas recruitment agreements and as a marketer of Philippine labour overseas, private nursing schools have acted as migration funnels, expanding enrolment, asserting control over the licensure process, and entering into business agreements with other overseas recruitment agencies. However, retaining qualified instructors and staff has been reported to be as problematic as retaining actual nurses, contributing to low exam pass rates (only 12 of 175 reporting schools had pass rates of 90% or higher in 2005, with an average pass rate of 42% across the country in 2006). Private schools have also begun to control licensure exam review centres, providing extra preparation for international qualification exams at extra cost and with no guarantee of success. It is estimated that between 1999 and 2006, US$700 million was spent on nursing education and licensure review courses by individuals who never took the licensing exams or completed the programming.

Discrepancies in wages between Philippine nurses working at home and those working abroad, as noted above, provide clear economic incentives for nurses to leave the country; however, physicians have also been lured into these promises of wealth through the creation of "Second Course" nursing programs. Studies comparing wages of Philippine nurses at home and abroad from 2005 to 2010, showed at-home nurses receiving US$170 per month, or $2,040 per annum, compared to US$3,000–4,000 per month in the US, or $36,000–48,000 per annum. Philippine physician salaries for those working at home are not much more competitive; they earn on average US$300–800 per month, or US$3,600–9,600 per annum. Although along with such discrepancies the costs of living are also higher in the US, and remittance payment transfers back home are not free, there is still evidently a large economic pull to studying as a nurse and migrating overseas.

===== Vietnam =====
According to Viet Nam News, 70% of Vietnamese students abroad did not return to Vietnam. The New York Times described Barack Obama's remarks at the Young Southeast Asian Leaders Initiative on conditions that cause brain drain as "slyly" describing Vietnam, with corruption, pollution and poor education.

More recent news suggests that a so-called brain gain may be occurring. A 2016 study found that 70% of overseas professionals were interested in returning to Vietnam, with many thousands already having done so.

==== South Asia ====
===== India =====
India has seen massive emigration since the 1980s, and most Indian scholars seek to settle abroad for better opportunities. Major push factors include a lack of research facilities, low ease of doing business, and fewer opportunities due to a lack of skills and innovation.

Studies have found that, since 2014, 23,000 millionaires and, since 2019, nearly 7,000 millionaires (2% of India's High-net-worth individuals at the time) have emigrated from India.

===== Nepal =====
Every year, 250,000 youths are reported to leave Nepal for various reasons. They seek opportunity in its various manifestations—higher living standards, employment, better income, education, an alluring western lifestyle, stability and security.

===== Pakistan =====
According to the Pakistan Economic Survey for 2023-24, over 13.53 million Pakistanis have officially emigrated to over 50 countries for work by April 2024. Pakistan has been seeing a large number of its educated youth immigrating to foreign countries, more particularly to the Gulf and west, since the change of Government in April 2022. A major contributor for this is corruption, political instability, better living standards and more opportunities. Immigration rate had slowed during PM Imran Khan's reign but rapidly increased after the change of Government in April 2022.

===== Sri Lanka =====
Sri Lanka has lost a significant portion of its intellectuals, mainly due to civil war and the resulting uncertainty that prevailed in the country for the thirty-year period prior to the end of the conflict in 2009. Most of these sought refuge in countries such as the United States, Australia, Canada and Great Britain. In recent years, many expatriates have indicated interest in returning to Sri Lanka, but have been deterred by slow economic growth and political instability. Both the government and private organizations are making efforts to encourage professionals to return to Sri Lanka and to retain resident intellectuals and professionals.

==== China ====
With rapid GDP growth and a higher degree of openness towards the rest of the world, there has been an upsurge in Chinese emigration to Western countries—particularly the United States, Canada and Australia. As of 2013, 4% of the world's migrants came from China. According to the official Chinese media, in 2009, 65,000 Chinese secured immigration or permanent resident status in the United States, 25,000 in Canada and 15,000 in Australia. The largest group of emigrants consists of professionals and experts with a middle-class background, raising concerns about a "brain drain" of the people who contribute most to the development of China. According to a 2007 study, seven out of every ten students from China who enroll in an overseas university never return to live in their homeland.

=== Australasia ===
==== Pacific Islands ====
The post-WWII migration trends in the Pacific Islands have essentially followed this pattern:

- Most Pacific island nations that were formerly under UK mandate have had migration outflows to Australia and New Zealand since the decolonisation of the region from the 1960s to the 1990s. There has only been a limited outflow from these islands to Canada and the UK since decolonisation. Fiji, Tonga and Samoa also have had large outflows to the United States.
- Most Pacific islands administered by France (like Tahiti) have had an outflow to France.
- Most Pacific islands under some kind of US administration have had outflows to the US and, to a lesser extent, Canada.

==== New Zealand ====
During the 1990s, 30,000 New Zealanders were emigrating each year. An OECD report released in 2005 revealed that 24.2% of New Zealanders with a tertiary education were living outside of New Zealand, predominantly in Australia. In 2007, around 24,000 New Zealanders settled in Australia.

During the 2008 election campaign, the National Party campaigned on the ruling Labour Party's inability to keep New Zealanders at home, with a series of billboards announcing "Wave goodbye to higher taxes, not your loved ones". However, four years after the National Party won that election, the exodus to Australia had intensified, surpassing 53,000 per annum in 2012. Prime Minister John Key blamed the 2008 financial crisis for the continuing drain.

It was estimated in December 2012 that 170,000 New Zealanders had left for Australia since the Key government came to power in late 2008. However, this net migration was reversed soon after, with a net migration gain of 1,933 people achieved in 2016. Economist Paul Bloxham described New Zealand's strong economy, with a housing and construction boom at the time. Australia's weaker economy and reduced investment in mining industries during this time were also mentioned as key factors.

New Zealand enjoys immigration of qualified foreigners, potentially leaving a net gain of skills. Nevertheless, one reason for New Zealand's attempt to target immigration at 1% of its population per year is because of its high rate of emigration, which leaves its migration balance either neutral or slightly positive.

=== North America ===
==== Canada ====
Colonial administrators in Canada observed the trend of human capital flight to the United States as early as the 1860s, when it was already clear that a majority of immigrants arriving at Quebec City were en route to destinations in the United States. Alexander C. Buchanan, government agent at Quebec, argued that prospective emigrants should be offered free land to remain in Canada. The issue of attracting and keeping the right immigrants has sometimes been central to Canada's immigration history.

When governments displayed no interest to emigrating scientists and engineers in the 1900s, concerned industrialists formed the Technical Service Council in 1927 to combat the brain drain. As a practical means of doing so, the council operated a placement service that was free to graduates.

By 1976, the council had placed over 16,000 men and women. Between 1960 and 1979 over 17,000 engineers and scientists emigrated to the United States. However, the exodus of technically trained Canadians dropped from 27% of graduating classes in 1927 to under 10% in 1951 and 5% in 1967.

In Canada today, the idea of a brain drain to the United States is occasionally a domestic political issue. At times, brain drain is used as a justification for income tax cuts. During the 1990s, some alleged a brain drain from Canada to the United States, especially in the software, aerospace, health care and entertainment industries, due to the perception of higher wages and lower income taxes in the US. Some also suggest that engineers and scientists were also attracted by the greater diversity of jobs and a perceived lack of research funding in Canada.

The evidence suggests that, in the 1990s, Canada did lose some of its homegrown talent to the US. Nevertheless, Canada hedged against these losses by attracting more highly skilled workers from abroad. This allowed the country to realize a net brain gain as more professionals entered Canada than left. Sometimes, the qualifications of these migrants are given no recognition in Canada (see credentialism), resulting in some highly skilled professionals taking unrestricted jobs until they prove their skills meet Canadian requirements.

In the mid-2000s, Canada's resilient economy, strong domestic market, high standard of living, and considerable wage growth across a number of sectors, effectively ended the brain drain debate. Canada's economic success even prompted some top US talent to migrate north. Anecdotal evidence also suggests that stringent US security measures put in place after the 9/11 attacks have helped to temper the brain drain debate in Canada.

==== Caribbean ====
Many of the Caribbean Islands endure a constant and substantial emigration of qualified workers. Approximately 30% of the labour forces of many islands have left, and more than 80% of college graduates from Suriname, Haiti, Grenada and Guyana have emigrated, mostly to the United States. Over 80% of Jamaicans with higher education live abroad. However, it is noted that these nationals pay valuable remittances. In Jamaica, the money sent back amounts to 18% of GNP.

==== United States ====
The 2000 United States Census led to a special report on domestic worker migration, with a focus on the movement of young, single, college-educated migrants. The data show a trend of such people moving away from the Rust Belt and northern Great Plains region towards the West Coast, Southwestern and Southeast United States. The largest net influx of young, single, college-educated persons was to the San Francisco Bay Area.

Many predominantly rural communities in the Appalachia region of the United States have experienced a "brain drain" of young college students migrating to urban areas in and outside of Appalachia for employment, political reasons and opportunities offered in urban areas that rural communities are currently unable to.

The country as a whole does not experience large-scale human capital flight as compared with other countries, with an emigration rate of only 0.7 per 1,000 educated people, but it is often the destination of skilled workers migrating from elsewhere in the world.

Historically a major recipient of brain gain, American higher education has seen less foreign students and faculty during the second presidency of Donald Trump. In Fall of 2025, international undergraduate enrollment dropped 17%, with international student enrollment dropping 12%. Many Americans in academia have left or have expressed desires to leave, citing concerns such as the government cutting funds, targeting LGBTQ and immigrant populations, and imposing ideologies that inhibit freedom of research.

Regarding foreign scholars earning their degrees in the United States and returning to their home country, Danielle Guichard-Ashbrook of the Massachusetts Institute of Technology has been quoted as stating "We educate them, but then we don't make it easy for them to stay".

During the 2020s, due to controversial tenure track laws passed in Florida, the state has experienced a brain drain.

=== South America ===
==== Colombia ====
In recent years, many people from younger generations (people born from 1994 onwards) have migrated out of Colombia. Many of them are looking for better employment opportunities elsewhere due to the political turmoil that has been going on in the past decades. In many cases, the flight of educated people from Colombia does not occur, due to a lack of economic resources from the people and no governmental support in any extracurricular endeavors (sports or liberal arts). Even though, Colombia has recently implemented programs to benefit people that have higher scores in the ICFES (a national exam mandated for every high-schooler in the country before graduation), such as the ICETEX (Instituto Colombiano de Crédito Educativo y Estudios Técnicos en el Exterior) scholarships; many people who score highly on these mandate exams end up migrating to other countries for higher education. Some may argue, including those who have scored highly in the ICFES, that they are taking the place of someone less fortunate who deserves, wants and will use an ICETEX scholarship.

==== Cuba ====
In 1997, Cuban officials claimed that 31,000 Cuban doctors were deployed in 61 countries. A large number practice in South America. In 2007, it was reported that 20,000 were employed in Venezuela in exchange for nearly 100,000 barrels (16,000 m^{3}) of oil per day.

However, in Venezuela and Bolivia, where another 1,700 doctors work, it is stated that as many as 500 doctors may have fled the missions in the years preceding 2007 into countries nearby. This number increased dramatically, with 1,289 visas being given to Cuban medical professionals in the United States alone in 2014, with the majority of Cuban medical personnel fleeing from Venezuela due to poor social conditions and not receiving adequate payment; the Cuban government allegedly receives the majority of payments while some doctors are left with about $100 per month in earnings.

==== Venezuela ====
Following the election of Hugo Chávez as president and his establishment of the Bolivarian Revolution, millions of people emigrated from Venezuela. In 2009, it was estimated that more than 1 million Venezuelans emigrated since Hugo Chávez became president. It has been calculated that from 1998 to 2013, over 1.5 million Venezuelans, between 4% and 6% of the Venezuela's total population, left the country following the Bolivarian Revolution. Academics and business leaders have stated that emigration from Venezuela increased significantly during the last years of Chávez's presidency and especially during the presidency of Nicolás Maduro and Delcy Rodríguez.

An analysis of a study by the Central University of Venezuela titled "Venezuelan Community Abroad. A New Method of Exile" states that the Venezuelan refugee crisis was caused by the "deterioration of both the economy and the social fabric, rampant crime, uncertainty and lack of hope for a change in leadership in the near future". The study states that of the more than 1.5 million Venezuelans who had left the country following the Bolivarian Revolution, more than 90% of those who left were college graduates, with 40% holding a master's degree and 12% having a doctorate or post doctorate. The Wall Street Journal stated that many "white-collar Venezuelans have fled the country's high crime rates, soaring inflation and expanding statist controls". Reasons for leaving cited by the former Venezuelan citizens studied included lack of freedom, high levels of insecurity and lack of opportunity in the country. Some Venezuelan parents have encouraged their children to leave the country.

2019 Venezuelan blackouts, which affected more than 30 million people nationwide and occurred intermittently over several months, sometimes lasting for days at a time, exacerbating the ongoing socioeconomic and political crisis, have been attributed by experts and the state-owned power company Corpoelec to a lack of maintenance and technical expertise in the country as a result of a brain drain.

== See also ==
- Convergence (economics)
- Economic results of migration
- Diaspora
- Foot voting
- Care drain
- Human capital
- Intelligentsia
- Knowledge transfer
