= Hồ Văn Châm =

South Vietnamese physician and official (1932–2013)

Hồ Văn Châm 胡文箴

Personal details
- Born: 9 July 1932 Phước Tích, Thừa Thiên province, French Indochina
- Died: 31 July 2013 (aged 81) Ottawa, Canada
- Party: Nationalist Party of Greater Vietnam
- Children: 8

Hồ Văn Châm (Chữ Hán: 胡文箴; 9 July 1932 – 31 July 2013), also known as Minh Vũ, was a South Vietnamese physician and official, who served as minister of Chieu Hoi and minister of veteran affairs. After the fall of the Republic of Vietnam in 1975, he was sent to a re-education camp. He moved to Canada after being released.

== Biography ==
Hồ Văn Châm was born on 9 July 1932 in the village of Phước Tích, Thừa Thiên Province, central Vietnam.

Châm joined the Nationalist Party of Greater Vietnam in 1955. In 1969, he was appointed commissioner general of the Central Executive Committee of the Nationalist Party of Greater Vietnam.

Châm died in Ottawa, Canada, on 31 July 2013, at the age of 82.

== Personal life ==
Hồ Văn Châm was a Buddhist with a Dharma name Nguyên Minh. His wife was from Quảng Ngãi province. The couple had eight children.

== Publications ==
- Les Relations Alimentaires dans les Corps de Troupes au Vietnam, doctoral thesis, Faculty of Medicine, Saigon, 1962
- Nutrition situation in Vietnam, 1965

== Medals ==
- Knight of the National Order of Vietnam
- Army Distinguished Service Order, Second Class
- Armed Forces Honor Medal, First Class
- Good Conduct Medal, Third Class
- Vietnam Campaign Medal
- Military Service Medal, Third Class
- Air Service Medal, Honor Class
- Health Medal, First Class
- Rural Development Medal
- Ethnic Development Medal, First Class
