= Technical Service Council =

The Technical Service Council was set up to combat the "brain drain" of Canadian engineers to the United States, when over 20% of the graduating classes were emigrating. Ireland, India, New Zealand and even Switzerland have had similar problems.

In 1927, Canadian industry financed the council, whose directors concluded that a non-profit employment service that was free to graduates might minimize emigration. The service survived the Depression, played a part in recruiting scientists and engineers for war work, pioneered outplacement and expanded to include other professional occupations. It financed major studies of the supply of and demand for engineers and offered free-job-hunting courses to professionals.

Although started in Toronto, the Council eventually had offices in Montreal, Winnipeg, Calgary, Edmonton and Vancouver before becoming bankrupt in 1994. It may have reduced the brain drain during its first 20 or 25 years, but it's not possible to judge its later record.

== History ==
=== Beginning ===
In the 1920s over 20% of Canadian engineering graduates emigrated to the United States. At that time, jobs in the U.S. were both much more numerous and more varied than in Canada. Meanwhile, the number of graduates soared, Canadian employers were unconvinced of the value of engineering degrees and new graduates complained of the lack of jobs.

Robert A. Bryce, president of Macassa Mines Ltd. and Prof. H.E.T. Haultain of the University of Toronto resolved to act. In April 1927 they and Rev.Canon H.J. Cody, chairman of the board of governors of the University of Toronto, invited the chief executives of major firms to a dinner at the National Club in Toronto. After hearing how the loss of talent could hamper industry, each of the 12 executives promised $1,000 to fund a non-profit organization to combat the "brain drain". The brain drain, the selling of science to employers and Canadian nationalism were tightly intertwined ideas. The firm was called the Technical Service Council.

Rolsa Eric Smythe was hired to run the council. Appropriately, he was a Canadian engineer who had been working in Detroit. (3)

After a study of placement operations in other countries and consultation with employers, the directors decided that engineers would not respond to urges to stay in Canada. Instead the Technical Service Council would find jobs for them by operating a free (to graduates) placement service. Employers would be invited to donate to the service, although later some companies used the service without contributing.

=== Objectives ===
The objectives were: To retain for Canada young Canadians educated along technical and scientific lines; to bring graduates of universities and technical institutions into practical contact with Canadian industry; to submit to universities the recommendations of industry concerning scientific courses and to aid industry in technical and scientific employment problems.

=== Early operations ===
A small office was opened in Toronto in 1928 with $30,000 "seed money" from 30 firms to finance a three-year experiment. Between July and December, 159 job hunters registered, 185 jobs were listed by employers and 81 engineers were placed by the staff of two.

The Great Depression soon arrived, wiping out many jobs. Some graduates were placed in welcome, but undemanding jobs, like street car conductor. Raising money was difficult and the Council survived only because of grants from the government of Ontario in 1932-34 and sometimes, Smythe's forgoing his salary. It was decided to ask those who had found jobs through the TSC to make donations. This produced some money, but the organization had a hand-to-mouth existence until 1957, apart from the World War II years. (3)

By June 30, 1933, over 1,180 personnel had been placed, 110 of whom were repatriated Canadians. Expenses for the first five years of operations were $44,988. In 1933, 111 men and women were placed by the council's staff of two.

Even then it was clear that engineers needed business knowledge. The Council persuaded the University of Western Ontario to offer a diploma course in management for engineers. Then such a course was novel, if not unique. In 1951 numerous employers and graduates in ceramic engineering were surveyed on behalf of the University of Saskatchewan to estimate future demand. Some time later a similar survey was made for the University of Toronto. As a result of these studies, both universities discontinued their ceramic engineering programs.

By 1938, in response employers' demand for "one-stop service", the Council expanded to include executives, accountants, marketing, production and personnel staff. A year later, the economy had improved, but the council's placements were mainly in Ontario and Quebec, where Canada's industry was concentrated.

=== Wartime years ===
Job vacancies soared with the start of World War II. Shipyards, steel mills, armaments and munitions factories, aircraft manufacturers and construction companies urgently needed engineers. Few engineers even considered emigrating to the United States because of patriotic reasons and the plethora of jobs.

The Technical Service Council was the only placement service allowed to operate during the war. Its bank of professionals was such an important national resource that 15 recruiters from Defence Industries Ltd., the major munitions manufacturer, were loaned to the council.

=== Post-war activities ===
After the war, veterans were entitled to free university tuition. Therefore, record numbers of engineers were graduated in 1949 and 1950. Graduates of Western and Maritime universities, both in areas with limited industry, greatly outnumbered local vacancies. Many engineers moved to Ontario, Quebec and the United States. About 2,500 professional men emigrated to the United States in 1950 alone. Nevertheless, one study showed that the exodus of technically trained graduates dropped from 27% of the graduating classes in 1927 to under 10% in 1951.

Pioneering work was done on group interviews and recruitment advertising in 1950–52. The latter study showed how employers could increase response to their ads. The Federal government engaged the council to write a handbook on the job market for immigrants while the Ontario Government asked the council to appraise opportunities for prospective immigrants from Great Britain.

Canadian industry contributed more than $300,000 to the Council between 1927 and 1953. During the same period, employers listed 16,533 job vacancies. 6,817 men with special training were placed in key positions in business and industry. The Council registered and interviewed 24,607 men with higher education. The qualifications of each were carefully cross-indexed and maintained for employers. An additional 100,000 individuals were interviewed to assess qualifications and give free vocational advice. The average cost per placement rose from $50 to $100 between 1948 and 1954.

Between 1951 and 1956, 3,072 engineers, equivalent to 31% of graduating classes in engineering, emigrated to the United States. They could have staffed the largest missile centre in the Western World. In 1951 the equivalent of 11% of the graduating classes in engineering left for the United States. In 1956, as immigrants were less likely to be drafted, the percentage had soared to 46%.

In 1957 the Council almost collapsed, but it was revived by new management who increased placement fees.

Shortages of engineers and scientists in Canada often coincided with equally acute shortages in the United States. American companies then recruited actively in Canada, as they did following the 1959 cancellation of Canada's much-vaunted Avro Arrow jet fighter. In addition, Canadians completing post-graduate training in the U.S. often found getting a job locally easier than searching for one in distant Canada.

In 1962 a branch in Montreal called Technical Service Council/Le Conseil de Placement Professionnel was opened. It was followed by others in Winnipeg, Calgary, Edmonton and Vancouver.

=== Outplacement and other activities ===
The council was one of the pioneers of outplacement (then called relocation counselling) in Canada. Its first contract in 1970 eventually developed into a significant activity. In addition to individual counselling, free office services and other benefits, clients were given How to Job Hunt Effectively, a substantial hand and work book. The book was also available to the public and over 5,000 copies were sold.

From 1967 regular one-day employment interviewing courses for line managers were run in major cities. Students received written critiques of their interviews with actors.

By 1971 out-of-work university graduates were so numerous that free "How to Job Hunt" courses were held in several cities. As another public service, over $200,000. was spent researching and publishing ten-year forecasts of the supply of and demand for engineering graduates in 1975 and again in 1988. Both studies were intended to improve understanding of the job market, candidate mobility and help minimize "mismatch". They were provided free to Canadian universities and sold at below cost to employers.

In the same year, an executive search division, Bryce, Haultain & Associates, was opened and named after two of the council's co-founders.

=== Later placement activities ===
By 1976 the council had placed over 16,000 men and women. An equal number were estimated to have rejected job offers from the council's client companies. Studies showed that 25% of job listings were never filled from any source. Employers' reasons included budget cuts, inability to find someone who filled the job specifications, candidates' high asking salaries, reorganizations and a belated realization that existing staff could do the job.

In 1976 573 firms were members. Annual membership fees were mainly $100 to $500., depending upon company size and usage. Placement fees were kept low in order to attract job listings. The greater the choice of vacancies, the more likely candidates were to stay in Canada. Placement fees for member companies were 4% to 5% of the placement's annual income. Commercial employment agencies charged 20% to 30%.

Over 17,000 engineers and scientists emigrated from Canada to the United States between 1960 and 1979. The number of engineers emigrating declined from 1,209 in 1967 to only 289 in 1977, and the number of chemists emigrating dropped from 156 to 58 during the same period. However, engineers and scientists emigrating increased from 727 in 1982 to 1,433 in 1985.

Active job listings reached 4,328 in June 1981, an astonishing figure for such a clearing house. Orders plummeted when Prime Minister Pierre Trudeau's highly controversial National Energy Program took effect. About half the council's staff was laid off.

Nevertheless, between 1928 and 1988, over 46,000 men and women had received job offers from about 1,700 of the council's employer clients.

Frequent dramatic swings in the job market caused the council to build a financial reserve equal to two times' annual operating expenses. The reserve was over three times' expenses in December, 1991, but the council was declared bankrupt in September, 1994.

== Evaluation of results ==
From 1928 to 1939, job vacancies were mainly advertised locally so job hunters had difficulty learning of distant jobs. The Maritimes and West had so little industry that their substantial engineering graduating classes had to seek positions elsewhere. Employers seldom sought professionals through the Federal employment service while universities had tiny or non-existent placement services. This lack of job information made the council's numerous industrial contacts especially important to job hunters. The exodus of technically trained Canadians is said to have dropped from 27% of graduating classes in 1927 to under 10% in 1951 and 5% in 1967.

Any evaluation of the later years is difficult. The number of job vacancies and job hunters both increased. But often supply and demand were out of sync, encouraging emigration. Universities devoted more resources to placing their graduates, but often gave little attention to experienced graduates. Commercial employment agencies expanded, but few lasted five years because of the erratic job market. Eventually, one and then another national newspaper spread news of distant vacancies. Although graduates had better information than ever, the council was still busy. Despite this, 2,500 professional men moved to the United States in 1950 alone. It is impossible to judge the council's impact on the "brain drain" since then.

The Ministry of State, Science and Technology asked the council to study the feasibility of a National Register of Canadians in research-oriented occupations who are working or studying out of the country. The study found that 65% of employers contacted had a strong or moderate interest in a register. It was estimated that only one or two per cent of candidates would find jobs through the register. Neither the register nor a free handbook on job hunting in Canada would get at the reasons why many Canadians do not return: a perceived lack of opportunities in their specialty and lack of research support in Canada.

The study noted that efforts by the Association of Medical Colleges of Canada and the Association of Universities and Colleges of Canada to recruit Canadians in the U.S. had failed. In 1986 twenty British firms advertised for British-trained engineers in North America. The ads produced 6,500 replies and about 1,800 job offers. Only 89 offers were accepted at what was considered an uneconomical cost.
