= HVR =

HVR may refer to:

- Hidden Valley Ranch
- HVR Consulting Services Ltd., now part of Qinetiq
- Havre City–County Airport in Montana, United States
- Hemlock Valley Resort, in British Columbia, Canada
- Hotham Valley Railway, in Western Australia
- Hypervariable region, a location within nuclear or mitochondrial DNA
- Hypoxic ventilatory response
- Hudson Valley Renegades, an American minor league baseball team.
