= Chieu Hoi =

US, South Vietnamese defection program

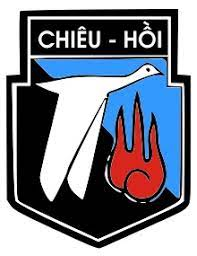
Logo

The Chiêu Hồi program ([ciə̯w˧ hoj˧˩]; also spelled "chiu hoi" or "chu-hoi" in American documents; loosely translated as "Open Arms" or "Return") was an initiative launched in early 1963 by the United States and South Vietnam to encourage defection by the People's Army of Vietnam (PAVN) and Viet Cong (VC) and their supporters to the side of South Vietnam during the Vietnam War. According to the U.S., 101,511 PAVN/VC defected under the program but one analyst speculates that fewer than 22% of those were genuine, the rest were merely seeking temporary respite from the conflict before slipping back into the PAVN/VC base, while others were not Vietcong but seeking monetary gain.

== Campaign ==
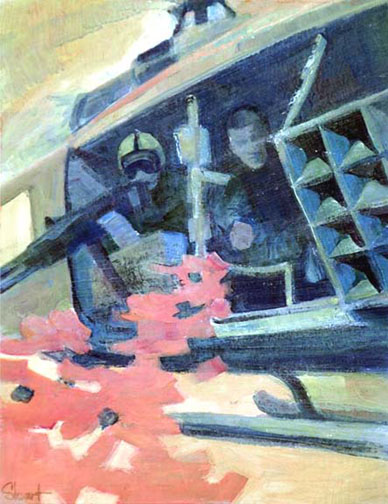
Chieu Hoi Mission by Craig L. Stewart, U. S. Army Vietnam Combat Artists Team IX (CAT IX 1969–70). The painting shows army soldiers airdropping 'psy op' leaflets during the Vietnam War.

Defection was urged by means of a propaganda campaign, usually leaflets delivered by artillery shell or dropped over enemy-controlled areas by aircraft, or messages broadcast over areas of South Vietnam. A number of incentives were offered to those who chose to cooperate, along with psychological warfare to break enemy morale.

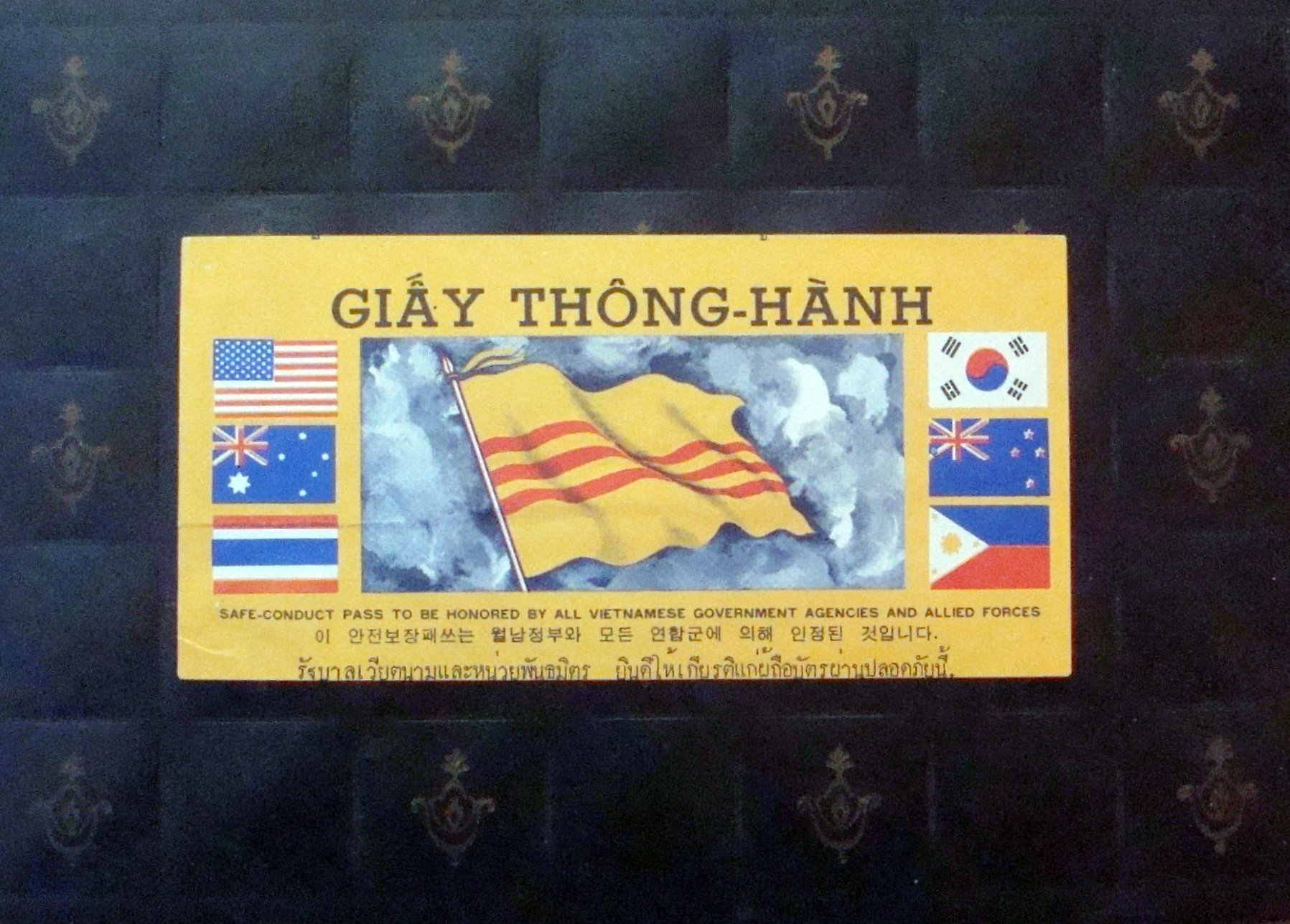
Safe conduct pass

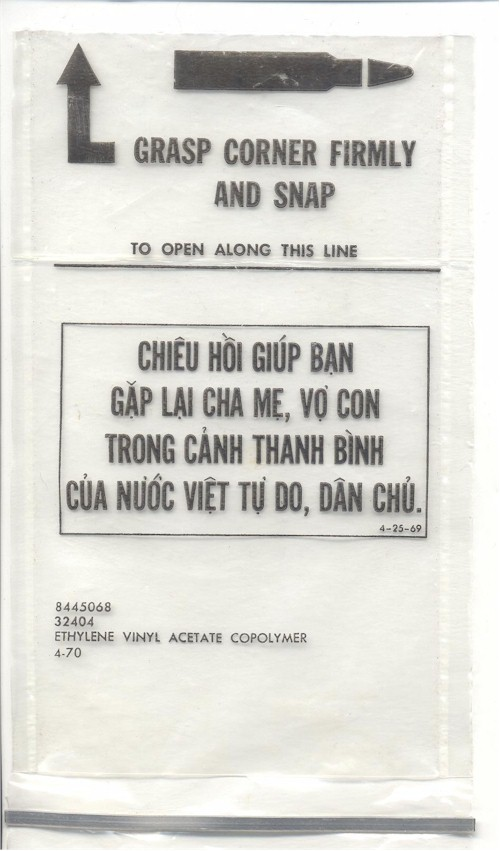
A Chieu Hoi bag

To further this aim, invitations to defect, which also acted as safe conduct passes, were printed on clear plastic waterproof bags used to carry ammunition for the U.S. soldiers' M16 rifle. Each bag held one magazine and was sealed to prevent moisture from the jungle's humid climate from damaging the contents. When the magazine was needed during a firefight with the enemy, the bag would be torn open and discarded, in the hope that it would later be discovered by enemy troops who would read the text and consider defection.

In 1969-1970, approximately 79,000 defections had been recorded, but analysts speculate that less than 17,000 of those (21.5%) were genuine. The program had some difficulty catching on, due in part to culture gap—errors, such as misspellings and unintentionally offensive statements—and worsened by communist reprisals against defectors and their families. To make matters worse, as testified by Sergeant Scott Camil during the 1971 Winter Soldier Investigation, the passes were sometimes ignored by U.S. forces, and their holders shot while surrendering.

Overall, however, the Chieu Hoi program was claimed successful by the U.S government Those who surrendered were known as "Hoi Chanh" and were often integrated into allied units as Kit Carson Scouts, operating in the same area where they had defected. Many made great contributions to the effectiveness of U.S. units, and often distinguished themselves, earning decorations as high as the Silver Star.

== Related people ==
- Hồ Văn Châm

== Sources ==
=== News ===
- "Moving Forward". Time. 1966-09-23. Archived from the original on February 20, 2008.
- "Allies' Aims & Hopes, In War & Peace". Time. 1966-11-04. Archived from the original on February 20, 2008.
- "Charlie, Come Home!". Time. 1967-02-10. Archived from the original on February 20, 2008.
- "Coming On Over". Time. 1967-04-14. Archived from the original on December 15, 2008.
- "After Crossing Over". Time. 1968-08-23. Archived from the original on December 28, 2008.
- Jenkins, Brian Michael (2005-06-26). "Strategy: Political warfare neglected". San Diego Union Tribune.
- Gerwehr, Scott; Nina Hachigian (2005-08-25). "In Iraq's Prisons, Try a Little Tenderness". The New York Times.
- Andrade, Dale (2006-11-03). "Too Soon To Rule Out Amnesty". The Washington Post. pp. A21.

=== Reports ===
- Carrier, J.M.; C.A.H. Thomson (May 1966). Viet Cong Motivation And Morale: The Special Case Of Chieu Hoi (PDF). RAND. RM-4830-2-ISA/ARPA.
- Kellen, Konrad (September 1970). Conversations With Enemy Soldiers In Late 1968/Early 1969: A Study Of Motivation And Morale (PDF). RAND. RM-6131-1-ISA/ARPA.
- Koch, J.A. (January 1973). The Chieu Hoi Program in South Vietnam, 1963-1971 (DECLASSIFIED) (PDF). RAND. R-1172-ARPA.
- Long, Austin (2006). On 'Other War': Lessons from Five Decades of RAND Counterinsurgency Research (PDF). RAND. ISBN 0-8330-3926-1.
