= Hypoxic ventilatory response =

Biological reaction to increased altitude

Hypoxic ventilatory response (HVR) is the increase in ventilation induced by hypoxia that allows the body to take in and transport lower concentrations of oxygen at higher rates. It is initially elevated in lowlanders who travel to high altitude, but reduces significantly over time as people acclimatize. In biological anthropology, HVR also refers to human adaptation to environmental stresses resulting from high altitude.

In mammals, HVR invokes several physiological mechanisms. It is a direct result of the decrease in partial pressure of oxygen in arterial blood, and leads to increased ventilation. The body has different ways of coping with acute hypoxia. Mammals that rely on pulmonary ventilation will increase their ventilation to account for the lack of oxygen reaching the tissues. Mammals will also experience decreases in aerobic metabolism and oxygen demand, along with increases in ATP production.

The physiological mechanisms differ in effect and in course of time. HVR is time dependent and can be divided into two phases: the first (0–5 minutes) of ventilation increase, and the second (5–20 minutes) of slow decline.

The initial increase in ventilation from HVR is initiated by the carotid bodies, which are bilaterally located at the port of brain circulation. Carotid bodies contain oxygen-sensitive cells that become more active in response to hypoxia. They send input to the brainstem which is then processed by respiratory centers. Other mechanisms include hypoxia-inducible factors, particularly HIF1. Hormonal changes have also been associated with HVR, particularly those that affect the functioning of the carotid bodies.

As HVR is a response to decreased oxygen availability, it shares the same environmental triggers as hypoxia. Such precursors include travelling to high altitude locations and living in an environment with high levels of carbon monoxide. Combined with climate, HVR can affect fitness and hydration. Especially for lowlanders who traverse past 6000 meters in altitude, the limit of prolonged human exposure to hypoxia, HVR may result in hyperventilation and ultimately the deterioration of the body. Oxygen consumption is reduced to a maximum of 1 liter per minute.

Travelers acclimatized to high altitudes exhibit high levels of HVR, as it provides advantages such as increased oxygen intake, enhanced physical and mental performance, and lower susceptibility to illnesses associated with high altitude. Adaptations in populations living at high altitudes range from cultural to genetic, and vary among populations. For example, Tibetans living at high altitudes have a more sensitive hypoxic ventilatory response than do Andean peoples living at similar altitudes, even though both populations exhibit greater aerobic capacity compared to lowlanders. The cause of this difference is most likely genetic, although developmental factors may also contribute.

== Physiology ==
=== Acute hypoxic ventilatory response ===
==== Acute response (AR) ====
The first stage of the hypoxic ventilatory response consists of the initial reaction to a hypoxic environment leading up to the peak known as short-term potentiation (STP). The process is induced by a decrease in oxygen partial pressure in blood. Type I glomus cells of carotid bodies detect the change in oxygen levels and release neurotransmitters towards the carotid sinus nerve, which in turn stimulates the brain, ultimately resulting in increased ventilation. The period of increased ventilation varies among different individuals but typically lasts under ten minutes.

==== Short-term potentiation (STP) ====
STP is the increase in ventilation after the acute hypoxic response and the eventual return of ventilation to its equilibrium after carotid sinus nerve stimulation, which causes a slowing in heart rate. This mechanism usually lasts between one and two minutes. STP is most apparent in tidal volume or the amplitude of phrenic neural output.

==== Short-term depression (STD) ====
STD is a temporary jump in respiratory frequency at the beginning of carotid chemo afferent stimulation or a temporary drop in respiratory frequency at the end of chemo afferent stimulation. This mechanism lasts from a span of several seconds to a few minutes. STP has only been found in the respiratory frequency of phrenic nerve stimulation, which produces contraction of the diaphragm.

==== Ventilatory response to sustained hypoxia ====
A continued presence in a hypoxic environment of more than 24 hours leads to a steady flow of ventilation. This contingency in the environment causes hypocapnia which decreases ventilation.

=== Chronic hypoxic ventilatory response ===
Chronic hypoxia results in further physiological changes due to the transcription factor hypoxia-inducible factor (HIF). HIF is a dimer composed of the HIF-1α and HIF-1β subunit. HIF-1α is normally unable to bind with HIF-1β. However, lower oxygen partial pressure induces post-transcriptional modification of HIF-1α, allowing HIF-1α to dimerize with HIF-1β to form HIF-1. HIF-1 induces many physiological changes that help the body adapt to the lower availability of oxygen including angiogenesis, increased erythropoietin production, and promoting anaerobic metabolism.

=== Neurology ===
The nervous system plays a key role in the hypoxic ventilatory response. The process is triggered by the peripheral nervous system's detection of a low blood oxygen level. In particular, the neurotransmitter glutamate has been shown to have a direct correlation to a rise in ventilation. A study conducted in dogs investigated how their cardiovascular systems respond to various levels of oxygen before and after being given MK-801, which is a glutamate antagonist. With the MK-801, there was a noticeable decrease in both heart rate and breaths per minute under hypoxia. According to the study, the fact that the HVR was lessened when glutamate was inhibited demonstrates that glutamate is essential to the response.

== High altitude adaptation ==
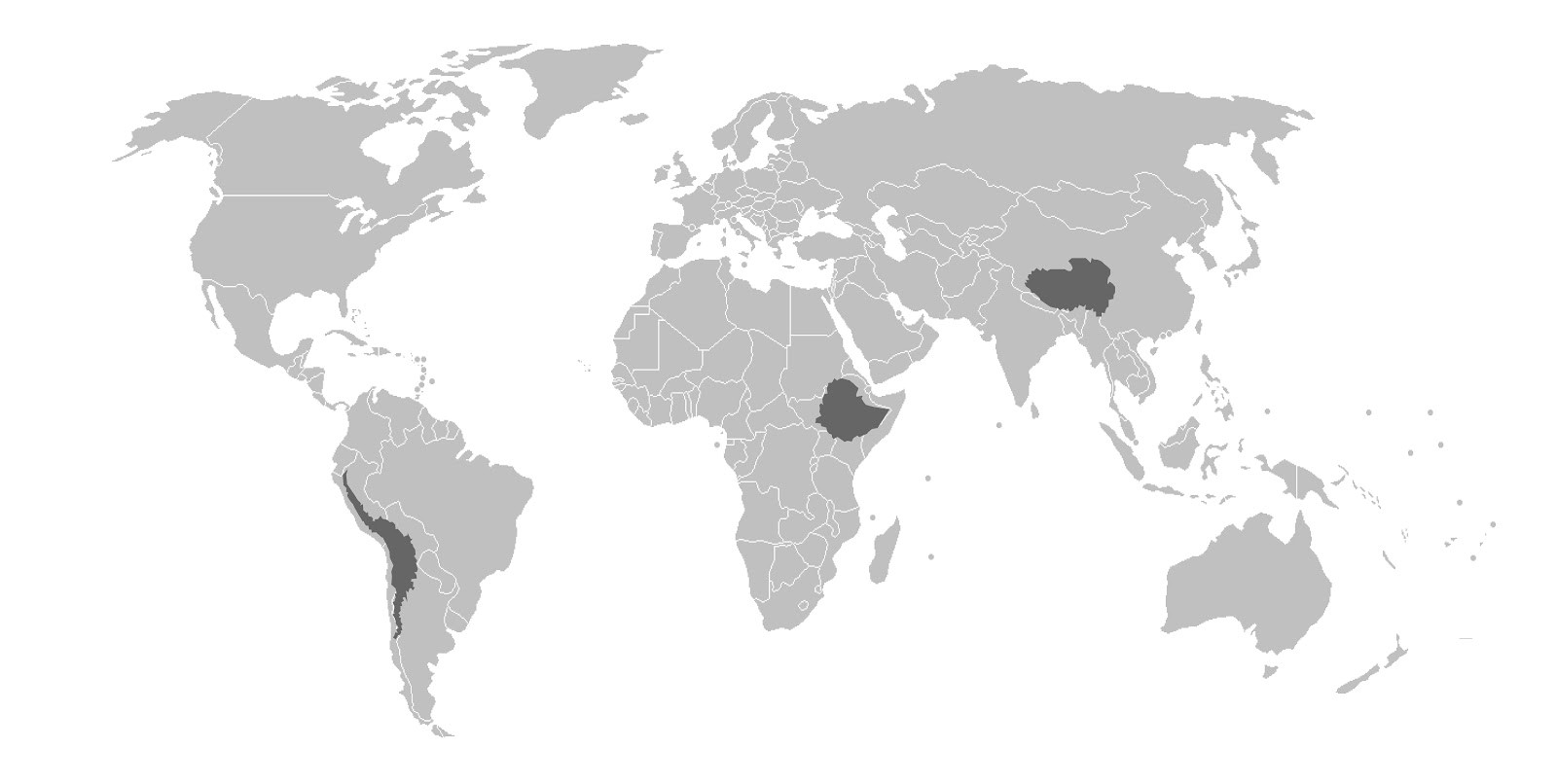
This image depicts the three high altitude areas where studied populations have adapted to their environment: (From left to right) Andean Altiplano, Simian Plateau, and Tibetan Plateau.

Populations residing in altitudes above 2,500 meters have adapted to their hypoxic environments. Chronic HVR is set of adaptations found among most human populations historically native to high-altitude regions, including the Tibetan Plateau, the Andean Altiplano, and the Simian Plateau. Up to 140 million people in total reside in such areas, although not all possess these adaptations. Populations that have permanently settled in high altitude locations show virtually no reaction to acute hypoxia. Natives of the Andes and the Himalayas have been shown to develop adaptation to hypoxia from birth to neonatal years in the form of larger lungs and greater gas exchange surface area. This response can be attributed to genetic factors, but the development of the resistance to acute hypoxia is highly affected by when the individual is exposed to high altitude; while genetic factors play an indefinite role in a person's HVR, because long term migrants do not show reduction in their reactions of high altitude even after living in high altitudes in long term, the discrepancy suggests that reaction to HVR is the combination of environmental exposure and genetic factors.

== Anthropology ==
=== Populations ===
==== Andeans ====
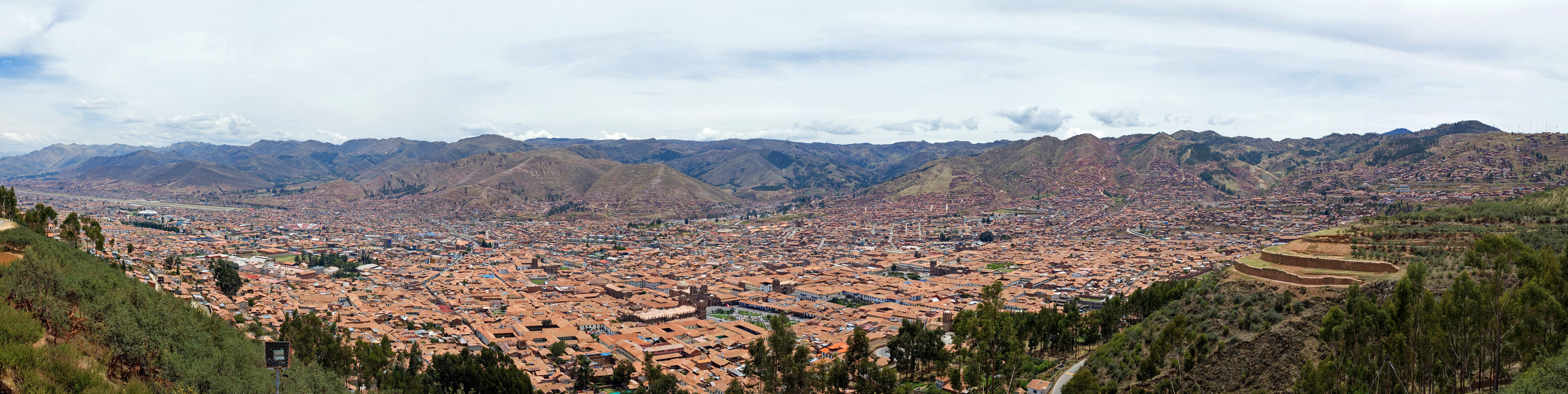
Cusco, Peru, which has an altitude of 11,000 ft

The Andean peoples are one of three central populations of study that have a decreased HVR. These populations notably inhabit areas in and around the Andes mountain range, which has an average altitude of 13,000 feet (4,000 m). HVR has been studied in inhabitants of Cusco, Peru, which lies at 11,000 feet (3,400 m). Living in such high altitudes has led to cultural adaptations, including the consumption of coca tea. Coca tea is an extract made by boiling the leaves of the coca plant in water and contains the stimulant Cocaine. For millennia, Andeans have used coca tea as a treatment for acute altitude sickness, and to this day it is still given to those travelling to the high altitude regions of Peru, though, its effectiveness has been disputed. In a 2010 study published in the Journal of Travel Medicine, the consumption of coca tea was actually associated with an increase in the incidence of altitude sickness experienced by travelers visiting the city of Cusco, Peru.

It has been found that the ventilatory response is substantially less pronounced in the Andean populations than in the Tibetans, with the HVR response of Tibetans roughly double that of Andeans at an altitude of around 4,000 metres (13,000 ft). The altitude adaptations also appear to be less permanent than those seen in the Tibetan populations, as the Andeans have a much higher prevalence of Chronic Mountain Sickness (CMS), where the body develops a harmful reaction to low oxygen levels over many years.

==== Tibetans ====
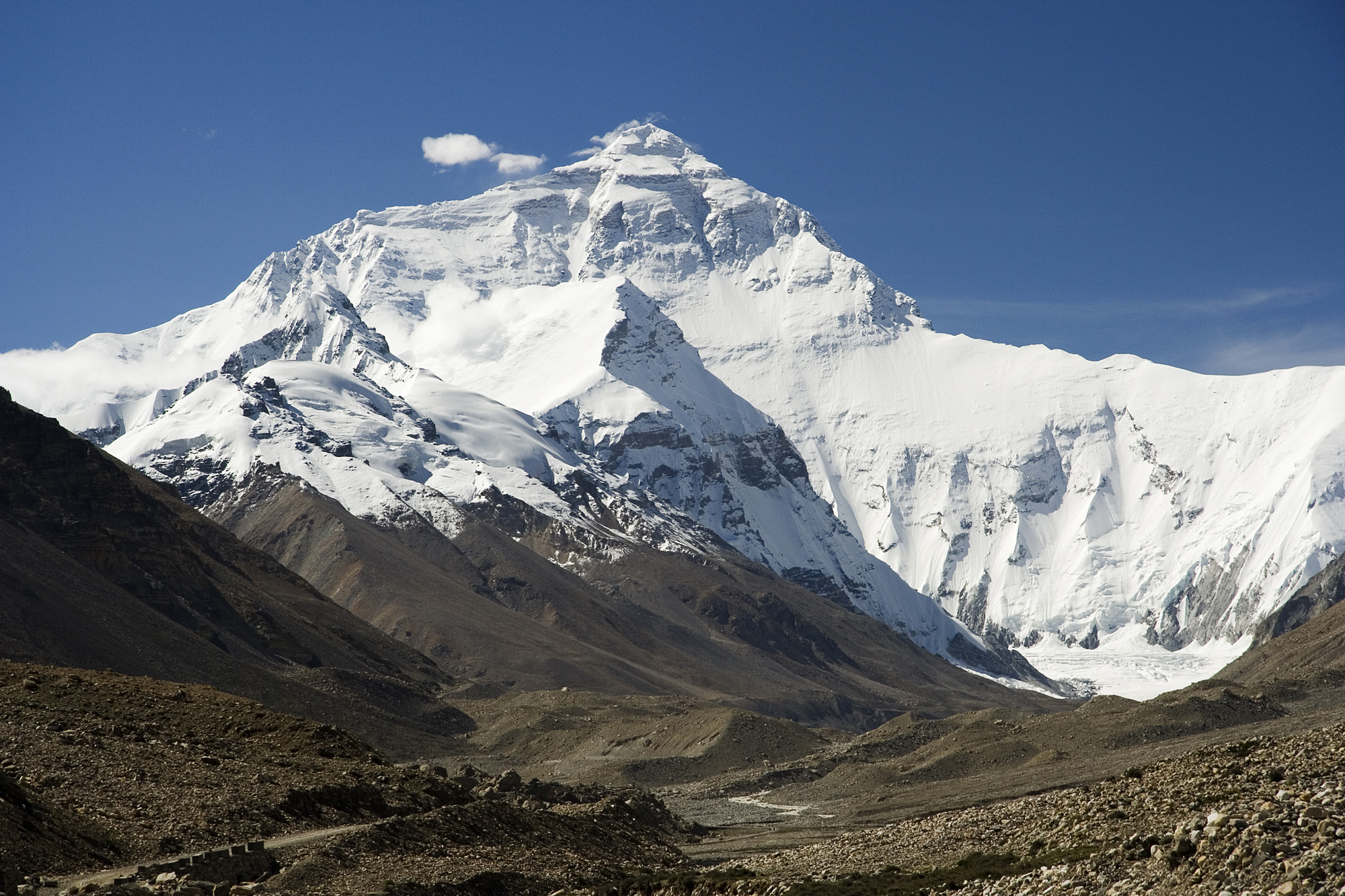
Mount Everest, the highest peak of the Himalayas.

The Tibetan people are an ethnic group native to Tibet that live throughout the Tibetan Plateau. They live at altitudes up to 15,000 feet (4,600 m), and are thus of extreme interest to researchers investigating HVR in high altitude populations. One of these populations are the Sherpa people, a group of Tibetans who are sought after for their knowledge of and skill with navigating through the Himalayas. Historically, Sherpas have been contracted to guide expeditions up Mount Everest, but the practice has since declined in light of exploitation of the Sherpa guides. The energy and ease at which the Sherpa ascend and descend mountains is due to their ability to use oxygen more efficiently. This ability to excel at mountaineering has shifted their culture around it. Tourism has become a driving force for the financial income of the Sherpa people. The Sherpa are able to make much more money acting as travel guides due to their local knowledge, and climbing ability.

Genetic evidence suggests that the Tibetan peoples diverged from the larger Han Chinese population any time around 1,000 B.C.E. to 7,000 B.C.E. Given the significant mutations to the EPAS1 gene that contribute to the Tibetan resistance to altitude sickness, this suggests that the extreme evolutionary pressure on the Tibetan peoples has produced one of the fastest natural selection effects seen in a human population. The adaptations of Tibetans to their hypoxic ventilatory response interact with other adaptations to promote successful reproduction. For example, Tibetans have evolved a greater oxygen saturation during infancy, leading to a lower rate of child mortality than experienced by non-adapted populations at altitude.

==== Amhara ====
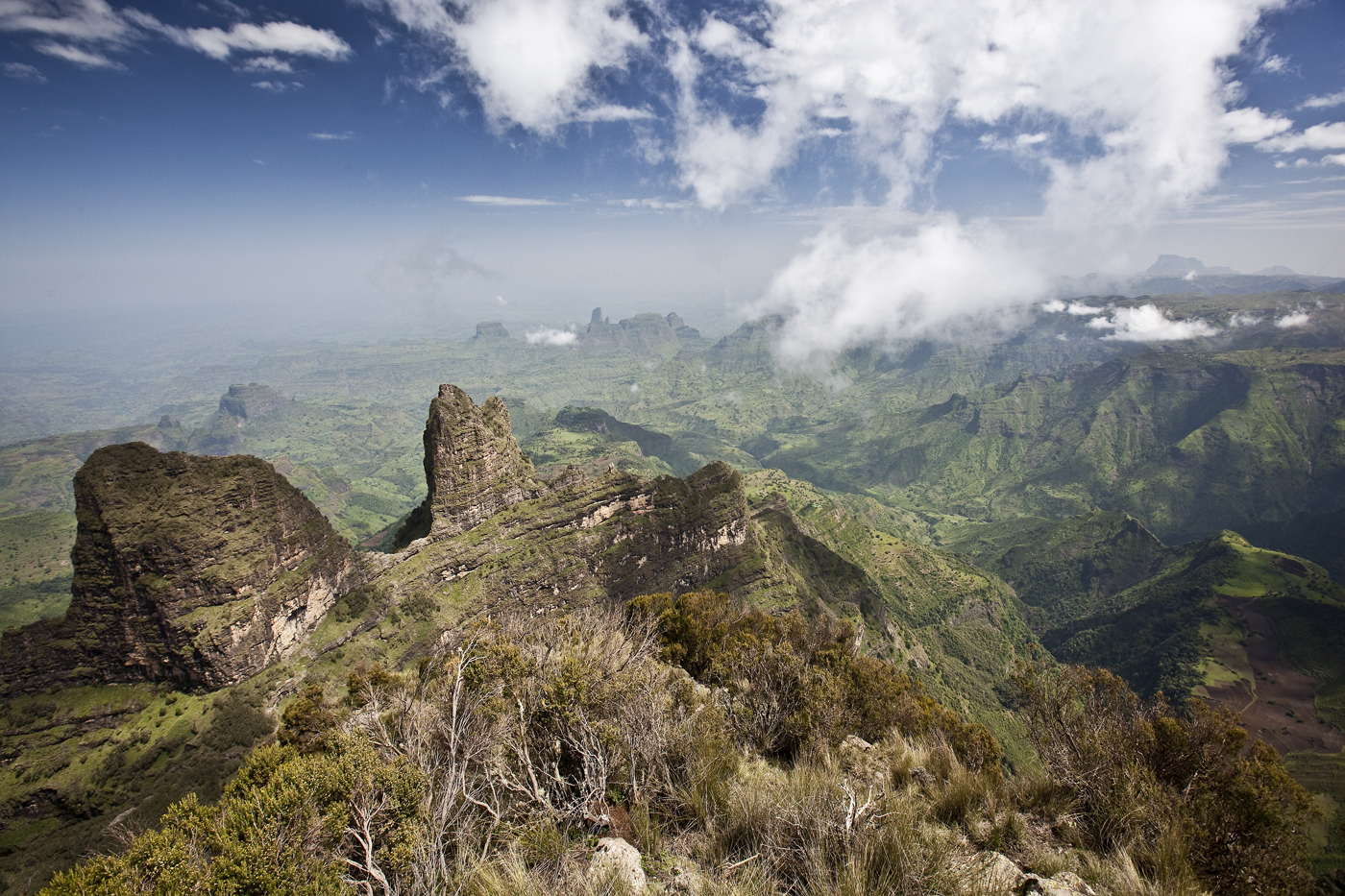
Simien Mountains 14,900 ft

The Amhara people are the occupants of the central and northern Highlands of Ethiopia in the Amhara Region, where the elevation ranges consistently between 1500 m (4,921 ft) to 4550 m (14,928 ft). For over 5,000 years humans have been living near the Simien Mountains at altitudes above 3,000m and over that time they genetically adapted to the hypoxic conditions of high altitude.
