= H. E. T. Haultain =

Canadian engineer and inventor (1869–1961)

Herbert Edward Terrick Haultain
- Born: August 9, 1869; Brighton, England
- Died: September 19, 1961 (aged 92); Toronto, Ontario
- Occupations: Engineer, inventor, professor

Academic background
- Education: School of Practical Science

Herbert Edward Terrick Haultain (9 August 1869 – 19 September 1961) was a Canadian engineer, inventor and professor.

He was born in Brighton, England, and died in Toronto, Ontario. He graduated from the School of Practical Science (now the University of Toronto Faculty of Applied Science and Engineering) with a degree in civil engineering in 1889. He joined the University of Toronto's engineering faculty as a professor in 1910.

Haultain was largely responsible for the creation of the Ritual of the Calling of an Engineer administered to many Canadian engineering students, where they receive the Iron Ring. The Haultain building at the University of Toronto is named for him and he is an inductee of the Canadian Mining Hall of Fame.

In the 1920s, 20% to 30% of the Canadian graduating classes in engineering were emigrating to the United States. In 1927 Professor Haultain and Robert A. Bryce, president of Macassa Mines and a noted mining engineer, co-founded the Technical Service Council, a non-profit, industry-sponsored organization. Its aim was to retain engineers for Canada by operating a placement service for them. In 1971, the council's executive search arm, Bryce, Haultain & Associates, was named after them. He died in 1961 and was buried in Little Lake Cemetery in Peterborough, Ontario.
