= Robert A. Bryce =

Canadian prospector and mining engineer

- Born: January 26, 1881; Toronto
- Died: October 12, 1963 (aged 82)
- Citizenship: Canadian
- Occupations: Engineer, prospector, mining developer
- Parent: Robert Bryce

Robert Alexander Bryce (January 26, 1881 – October 12, 1963) was born in Toronto, son of Scottish immigrants. He was a prospector and mine developer. He was most famous for being the founder and developer of Macassa Mines, a mining and metallurgy company operating in Kirkland Lake, in Ontario, Canada.

== Biography ==
=== Background ===
Robert Alexander Bryce was born in January 26, in Toronto, son of Scottish immigrants, Alexander and Emmeline (Hill) Bryce.

From 1900 to 1904, he studied mining engineering at the University of Toronto, where he continued his athletic pursuits in football, lacrosse and boxing.^{,}

After graduating, Bryce began his mining career outside Canada, first in New York City on tunnel development for the East River subway system. Employed for a couple of years in Mexico, he served in various capacities, sometime sampler, foreman for the following companies: Eloro Mining & Railway Co., Green Consolidated Copper Co.; Assistant Superintendent, Green Gold Placer Co.; Superintendent, Sierra de Cobre Copper Co.

He returned to Canada in 1908 to work in the Cobalt mining camp, initially in a production supervisory role and later as manager at the Silver Queen mine. He was also revamping the Beaver Mine for reopening.

In 1908, he married Edna Baxter of Toronto; the couple eventually had three children, the two first-borns while living in Cobalt : Robert, Dorothy, and John.

When operations at the Silver Queen mine ceased, Bryce continued in managerial and advisory capacities, consulting for the Ross Mine in Colorado and the Big Engine Mine in Nevada, both owned by the same syndicate. By 1912 he had resettled in Toronto and established himself as an independent consultant to the mining industry, developing a reputation for strong geological expertise and cultivating relationships with financiers in New York City and Rochester, New York.

=== Macassa Mine ===
As a consultant, Bryce became closely acquainted with the gold properties of the Kirkland Lake camp in northern Ontario. Around 1923 he identified the Elliott Kirkland claims, controlled by Rochester investors, as having significant potential. In 1926 those investors accepted his development proposal and Macassa Mines Limited was formed to advance the property. An adjoining block of claims owned by noted Kirkland Lake developer Harry Oakes was merged with Macassa Mines; Oakes became president of the new company, with Rochester lawyer W. A. Matson as vicepresident and Bryce serving as a director.

Exploration work in 1926 and early 1927 indicated that the Macassa property likely lay on the main east–west “break” of ore in the Kirkland Lake camp, the structure that would come to be known as the “Golden Mile.”^{,}^{,} By 1931, the neighbouring mine, Kirkland Lake Gold Mining Company, under contract with Bryce, extended a drift at the 754 m level (2,475 ft.) westward towards Macassa. After 170 m (558 ft.), the drilling intersected ore at grades of up to 24.1 g/tonne (0.77 oz/st. ton). Bryce’s belief in finding ore at depth had been proven correct.

Robert Bryce directed the project over the eight years of exploration and development, from incorporation in 1926 up to 1933 when the mine and mill first commenced operation. In late 1931, now with proven ore at depth, Bryce decided to sink a new 762 m (2,500 ft.) shaft directly to the rich ore zone. Implementing a novel plan which involved mining upward from beneath the deposit, lowered costs. A modest-sized mill designed for 180 tonnes/day (200 tons/day) was initially constructed. Two years later, in October 1933, Macassa operations commenced with the first gold brick poured in November 1933.^{,} Securing adequate funding during extremely difficult times (the Great Depression), he also had to conduct geological studies and exploration work to establish adequate reserves and he then created the team, build the plant and the company.^{,} One year later, the company paid its first dividend to shareholders. The company also took over the nearby United Kirkland claims to add to reserves.

Except for short-term stoppages in operation in 1997 (rock burst) and 1999 (low gold price) the Macassa Mine has continued to operate to this day (2025), producing in excess of 6.5 million ounces of gold, and becoming one of Canada’s most historic and long-lived gold operations. Following the success of the Macassa gold mine, Bryce steered the company to finance and manage several other mining ventures as subsidiaries of Macassa. This included the development of Renabie Gold Mines, located north of Wawa, Ontario, and Bincroft Uranium Mines near Bancroft, Ontario; both were moderately successful operations.^{,}

Robert Alexander Bryce remained Macassa’s President until his death in 1963 at age 82. The determination of one individual during a difficult economic climate had resulted in a seventh gold mine operating in Kirkland Lake. Macassa Mines is the last survivor in the mining camp of Kirkland Lake.

== See also ==
- Herbert Edward Terrick Haultain
