= Harsanyi =

Harsanyi or Harsányi is a Hungarian surname. Notable people with the surname include:

- Borbála Tóth Harsányi (born 1946), Hungarian handballer
- David Harsanyi (born 1970), American journalist.
- Gábor Harsányi (born 1945), Hungarian actor and voice actor
- Gergely Harsányi (born 1981), Hungarian handballer
- John Harsanyi (1920–2000), Hungarian-Australian-American economist and Nobel Prize winner
- Janice Harsanyi (1929–2007), American soprano singer and college professor
- Tibor Harsányi (1898–1954), Hungarian-born composer and pianist
- Vera Harsányi (1919–??), Hungarian freestyle swimmer
- Zoltán Harsányi (born 1987), Slovak footballer at Pécsi MFC
- Zsolt Harsányi (1887–1943), Hungarian author, dramatist, translator, and writer
