= Care drain =

Emigration of care givers

The term care drain, coined in 2002 by the feminist sociologist Arlie Russell Hochschild, refers to the migration of women working in caregiving roles and the impact on the families and nations they leave behind when seeking employment in countries with stronger economies.

Hochschild defines "care drain" as the feminine counterpart to the "brain drain". The coining of the term ‘care drain’ was inspired by a domestic worker from the Philippines, Rowena, who, according to Hochschild, was educated as an engineer before emigrating to the United States. However, Hochschild does not explain why she refers to this migrant woman as a ‘care drain’ rather than a ‘brain drain’. Rather than using Rowena's case to illustrate the discrimination experienced by highly skilled migrant women - a phenomenon already recognized in the literature - Hochschild coined a metaphor "care drain" that reframed a discriminated engineer primarily as a caregiver. Some scholars have described this reframing as an instance of "methodological sexism."

Other scholars coined the term "care gain" to refer to the benefits for women migrant workers, their families, and the receiving nations.

Care drain is notable in five migratory streams:

- From Eastern Europe to Western Europe
- From Mexico, Central America, and South America to the United States
- From North Africa to Southern Europe
- From South Asia to the Gulf states
- From the Philippines to all over the world—Hong Kong, the US, Europe, and Israel

== See also ==
- Global care chain
