= Phước Tích =

- Location of Phước Tích in Vietnam
- Coordinates: 16°38′17″N 107°18′37″E
- Country: Vietnam
- Province: Huế

Phước Tích is a village in Huế, Vietnam. Phước Tích is noted for its architectural, religious and historic value.

The village was established in 1470 and discovered in April 2003.
