= Brain circulation =

Brain circulation is the circular movement of skilled labour across nations.

Brain circulation differs from brain drain which describes skilled labour from certain countries emigrating to other countries in search of better opportunities. In India one witnessed large-scale emigration of engineers from its premier engineering institutes in the sixties, seventies and eighties.

The late nineties and the early years of the 21st century however saw large numbers of these emigrants returning to India as prospects in India improved markedly, brought on by important economic reforms initiated in the early nineties.

== Brain circulation vs. brain drain ==
There has been debate whether outflow of high skilled labor mobility should be regarded positively or negatively. The core theoretical framework for studying human capital flows dates back to at least John Hicks (1932), who noted that "differences in net economic advantages, chiefly differences in wages, are the main causes of migration". Classic literature back in 1950s~1980s also follows Hicks’ work, and has come to a consensus on receiving countries having benefits; however, sending countries lose human capital, and thus have potential negative effects of the skilled emigration (Bhagwati and Hamada, 1974).

Since the 1990s, a growing literature discusses the positive effect of high-skilled labor outflow, and argues that under certain circumstances, the brain drain may ultimately prove beneficial to the source country, and to do this while accounting for the various fiscal and technological externalities that were at the heart of the pessimistic models of the 1970s. Outflow of high-skilled labor can form a diaspora abroad, which promotes trade between the sending countries and countries that have the diaspora (Rauch and Trindale, 2002).

Some high skilled workers come back to their home countries, even though they once leave their home countries for various reasons such as political instability and wage gap. They still have connections with home countries through their extended families and friends, which can be an incentive for them to return home. Wahba (2014) points out that most migrants ponder and plan their move back home throughout their migration experience. There are growing evidences that show some immigrants decided to come back and start their new life in home countries. For example, 20 to 50% of immigrants return home or relocate to a different country within five years of their arrival (OECD, 2008). Also, almost one-third of the migrants who came to the U.S. between 1908 and 1957 returned to their home countries (Jasso and Rosenzweig, 1982). Moreover, nearly one-quarter of male migrants who came to Canada in 1996 left within five years (Aydemir and Robinson, 2008).

Some high-skilled workers return to home countries, not just move abroad. Then, why do they come back? First, they return home because they cannot adopt themselves to a new environment abroad. If they have trouble finding a job or making social connections, they might consider returning home. Dustmann and Görlach (2016) point out that if migrants struggle to assimilate or learn the language, this can contribute to their desire to return home.

Second, they return home because home countries have economic opportunities. One of the most critical reasons of high skilled outflow is wage gap between home countries and host countries. Many highly educated people go abroad to find a better job with higher salary. If home countries have a better job environment with reasonable salary, they are more likely to return home. Whether countries focus on tertiary industry or not can also be an important sign for high skilled labor abroad to return home. If countries have more budget for R&D and focus on a knowledge-based economy, workers would expect that they are more likely to get a suitable job where they can make use of their experiences abroad and contribute. Shin and Moon (2018) mentioned that some migrants abroad were interested in engaging their home countries but did not want to permanently return. Thus, it is important for governments to supplement return migration support policies.

Third, they return home because home countries offer benefits for returning from the diaspora abroad. Countries need many high skilled workers to stimulate their economic development. Thus, some countries offer benefits to highly educated people such as tax exemption, housing, and legal benefits. In the field of science and innovation, China's Thousand Talents Program is a well-known example.

Returning migrants can contribute to their home countries in various fields. First, return migration improves financial capital, entrepreneurship and social networks. They return home with a significant amount of financial capital, and a large portion of these savings is generally invested in housing and new businesses. Also, return migration has social networks around the world, which strengthens social networks within home countries and across the world (Adda et al., 2014). When migrants return home, they enhance social networks in several key ways. They build ties with other returnees and local non-migrants in job findings. They can also connect with diaspora members who remain overseas. These connections expand valuable social networks as well as professional ones.

Second, return migrants improve human capital and wage increases. The use of skills and knowledge acquired abroad can stimulate development and produce higher earnings at home. They also can show the importance of education through their successful career with higher education, which can increase people's expectations toward education. Furthermore, returnee scientists could help accelerate their home countries’ progress in scientific research, advancing them toward the frontier of global knowledge production.

Third, return migrations improve social norms and democracy. Many migrations from developing countries go to developed countries, where most countries have higher social norms with a democratic political system. Migrants are exposed to a host country's institutions, legal systems and other cultural norms. Batista and Vicente (2011) note that international migration can increase demand for improved governance. Countries can have more transparent political and economic systems through return migration.

Outflow of high-skilled labor has been considered as brain circulation, and they can potentially contribute to the home countries by bringing back their work experiences abroad.
