= Culture gap =

Systematic difference between two cultures

A culture gap is any systematic difference between two cultures which hinders mutual understanding or relations. Such differences include the values, behavior, education, and customs of the respective cultures. As international communications, travel, and trade have expanded, some of the communication and cultural divisions have lessened. Books on how to handle and be aware of cultural differences seek to prepare business people and travelers. Immigrants and migrant laborers need to learn the ways of a new culture. Tourists can also be confronted with variants in protocols for tipping, body language, personal space, dress codes, and other cultural issues. Language instructors try to teach cultural differences as well.

== Legal ==
A legal culture is a system of laws and precedents peculiar to a nation, region, religion, or other organized group. A culture gap occurs when incompatible or opposing systems might be applied to the same situation or assumed by the parties. Legal constructs such as contracts and corporations are not uniform across cultures. In some cases, such a gap is intentionally sought by one party, as in forum shopping for a more favorable legal framework or in libel tourism, by which speech protected in one jurisdiction may be actionable in another.

== Generational ==
A generation gap occurs when the experiences and attitudes of one generation differ significantly from those of another. The world wars contributed to generation gaps in several nations. The term first saw widespread use in contrasting the Baby Boomer generation with their parents. The "Youth culture" of adolescents and teenagers seeking to stake out their own identity and independence from their parents often results in a cultural divide. Younger generations have experienced different technologies, freedoms and standards of propriety.

== Professional ==
Communication between and collaboration among scientific disciplines is sometimes hindered by use of different paradigms or competition between the desires to describe a simple explanatory framework and elucidate fine details. The framework of the questions to which each field lends itself may differ, leading to frustration and wasted effort.

== Educational ==
The education culture is the different education people receive in their life. A culture gap occurs when people with different cultures sit together and take the same class. Different cultures behave differently towards the teacher both in class and after class. Differences can be noticed in assessment method and the direction method of the class.

Asian students focus on books and exercises more than European and American students, who are willing to raise questions in the classes. The cultural gap in education is due to the different education traditions in different places.

For example, Asian students receive exam-oriented education, but European and American students receive a very different, freer education and are both expected to challenge their teachers and strongly encouraged to challenge the teachers in class.

In both China and Japan, the education system normally usually uses exams to show a student's ability. In American and Britain, students grade instructors according to ability.

Both systems have advantages and disadvantages but form a cultural gap between people. Different ways of thinking and analyzing things makes students view things very differently.

== See also ==
- Cross-cultural communication
- Cultural anthropology
- Cultural bias
- Cultural diplomacy
- Cultural dissonance
- Cultural identity
- Cultural relativism
- Culture shock
- Ethnocentrism
- Generation gap
- Intercultural competence
- Legal culture
- National psychology
- Red states and blue states, a political manifestation of a culture gap in the United States
- Untranslatability
- Us Girls, sitcom about the culture gap among three generations of West Indian women.
