= Outline of engineering =

Overview of and topical guide to engineering

The following outline is provided as an overview of and topical guide to engineering:

Engineering is the scientific discipline and profession that applies scientific theories, mathematical methods, and empirical evidence to design, create, and analyze technological solutions cognizant of safety, human factors, physical laws, regulations, practicality, and cost.

== Branches of engineering ==
- Applied engineering
  - Packaging engineering
- Biological engineering
  - Agricultural engineering
  - Bionics
  - Genetic engineering
  - Biomedical engineering
  - Metabolic engineering
  - Neural engineering
  - Tissue engineering
- Civil engineering
  - Environmental engineering
  - Architectural engineering
  - Construction engineering
  - Geotechnical engineering
  - Transportation engineering
  - Hydro engineering
  - Structural engineering
  - Urban engineering (municipal engineering)
- Chemical engineering (outline)
  - Molecular engineering
  - Process engineering – also appears under industrial engineering
- Electrical engineering (outline)
  - Broadcast engineering
  - Computer engineering (outline)
  - Power systems engineering
  - Telecommunications engineering
  - Electronic engineering (includes microelectronics engineering, microelectronics and semiconductor engineering)
  - Optical engineering
- Electromechanical engineering
  - Control engineering (outline)
  - Mechatronics
  - Electromechanics
  - Instrumentation engineering
- Forensic engineering
- Geological engineering
- Green engineering
- Industrial engineering
  - Engineering psychology
  - Ergonomics
  - Facilities engineering
  - Logistic engineering
  - Performance engineering
  - Process engineering – also appears under chemical engineering
  - Quality engineering (quality assurance engineering)
  - Reliability engineering
  - Safety engineering
  - Security engineering
  - Support engineering
- Information engineering
- Materials engineering
  - Amorphous metals
  - Biomaterials engineering
  - Casting
  - Ceramic engineering
  - Composite materials
  - Computational materials science
  - Corrosion engineering
  - Crystal engineering
  - Electronic materials
  - Forensic materials engineering
  - Metal forming
  - Metallurgical engineering
  - Nanomaterials
  - Polymer engineering
  - Surface engineering
  - Welding
- Mechanical engineering
  - Acoustical engineering – includes audio engineering
  - Aerospace engineering – branch of engineering behind the design, construction and science of aircraft and spacecraft. It is broken into two major and overlapping branches:
    - Aeronautical engineering – deals with craft that stay within Earth's atmosphere
    - Astronautical engineering – deals with craft that operate outside of Earth's atmosphere
  - Automotive engineering (automotive systems engineering)
  - Manufacturing engineering
  - Marine engineering
  - Thermal engineering
  - Naval architecture
  - Sports engineering
  - Vacuum engineering
- Military engineering
  - Combat engineering
  - Military technology
- Petroleum engineering
  - Petroleum geology
  - Drilling engineering
  - Production engineering
  - Reservoir engineering
  - Well logging
  - Well testing
- Nuclear engineering
- Planetary engineering
  - Climate engineering (geoengineering)
- Software engineering
  - Computer-aided engineering
  - Knowledge engineering
  - Language engineering
  - Release engineering
  - Teletraffic engineering
  - Usability engineering
- Sustainable engineering
- Systems engineering – analysis, design, and control of gigantic engineering systems.
  - Ontology engineering

== History of engineering ==
History of engineering

- Greatest Engineering Achievements of the 20th Century
- History of chemical engineering
- History of electrical engineering
- History of mechanical engineering
- History of software engineering
- History of structural engineering
- Roman engineering
  - Roman military engineering

== Engineering concepts ==
- Design (outline)
  - Drawings
    - Computer-aided design (CAD)
    - Drafting
  - Engineering design process
- Earthworks
- Ecological engineering methods
- Engineering, procurement and construction
- Engineering economics
  - Cost
    - Manufacturing cost
  - Value-driven design
- Engineering overhead
- Engineering society
- Environmental engineering science
- Exploratory engineering
- Fasteners
- Flexibility
- Freeze
- Gate
- Good engineering practice
- Hand tools
- Machine tools
  - Punch
- Management
  - Planning
  - Teamwork
  - Peopleware
- Materials
  - Corrosion
  - Crystallization
  - Material science
- Measurement
- Model engineering
- Nanotechnology (outline)
- Non-recurring engineering
- Parts stress modelling
- Personalization
- Process
- Quality
  - Quality control
  - Validation
- Reverse engineering
- Risk analysis
- Structural analysis
  - Structural element
    - Beam
    - Strut
    - Tie
- Systems engineering process
- Tolerance
- Traction
- Yield

== Engineering education and certification ==
Engineering education

- Bachelor of Engineering
  - Bachelor of Applied Science
  - Bachelor of Technology
  - Bachelor of Biomedical Engineering
  - Bachelor of Computer Science
  - Bachelor of Electrical Engineering
  - Bachelor of Software Engineering
- Master of Engineering
  - Master of Science in Engineering
  - Master of Technology
  - Diplôme d'Ingénieur
  - Master of Applied Science
  - Master of Business Engineering
  - Master of Engineering Management
- Engineering doctorate
- Engineer's degree
- Engineering science and mechanics

Regulation and licensure in engineering

- Certified engineering technologist
- Fundamentals of Engineering exam
- Principles and Practice of Engineering examination
- Graduate Aptitude Test in Engineering

== Engineering awards ==
- Academy Scientific and Technical Award
- Award of Merit in Structural Engineering
- British Construction Industry Awards
- British Engineering Excellence Awards
- Charles Stark Draper Prize
- Engineering Heritage Awards
- Engineering Leadership Award
- Federal Engineer of the Year Award
- Gordon Prize
- IEEE Control Systems Award
- Louis Schwitzer Award
- Mondialogo Engineering Award
- NAS Award in Aeronautical Engineering
- Percy Nicholls Award
- Russ Prize
- Seymour Cray Computer Engineering Award
- Software Process Achievement Award
- Technology & Engineering Emmy Award
- The Science, Engineering & Technology Student of the Year Awards

== Engineering publications ==
- List of engineering journals and magazines

== Persons influential in the field of engineering ==
- Lists of engineers

== Indices ==
- Index of aerospace engineering articles
- Index of electrical engineering articles
- Index of genetic engineering articles
- Index of mechanical engineering articles
- Index of software engineering articles

== See also ==
- Outline of architecture
- Outline of construction
  - Infrastructure
- Outline of science
- Outline of technology
