= History of mechanical engineering =

Mechanical engineering is a discipline centered around the concept of using force multipliers, moving components, and machines. It utilizes knowledge of mathematics, physics, materials sciences, and engineering technologies. It is one of the oldest and broadest of the engineering disciplines.

== Dawn of civilization to early Antiquity ==
Engineering arose in early civilization as a general discipline for the creation of large scale structures such as irrigation, architecture, and military projects. Advances in food production through irrigation allowed a portion of the population to become specialists in Ancient Babylon.

All six of the classic simple machines were known in the ancient Near East. The wedge and the inclined plane (ramp) were known since prehistoric times. The wheel, along with the wheel and axle mechanism, was invented in Mesopotamia (modern Iraq) during the 5th millennium BC. The lever mechanism first appeared around 5,000 years ago in the Near East, where it was used in a simple balance scale, and to move large objects in ancient Egyptian technology. The lever was also used in the shadoof water-lifting device, the first crane machine, which appeared in Mesopotamia circa 3000 BC, and then in ancient Egyptian technology circa 2000 BC. The earliest evidence of pulleys dates back to Mesopotamia in the early 2nd millennium BC, and ancient Egypt during the Twelfth Dynasty (1991-1802 BC). The screw, the last of the simple machines to be invented, first appeared in Mesopotamia during the Neo-Assyrian period (911-609) BC. The Egyptian pyramids were built using three of the six simple machines, the inclined plane, the wedge, and the lever, to create structures like the Great Pyramid of Giza.

The Assyrians were notable in their use of metallurgy and incorporation of iron weapons. Many of their advancements were in military equipment. They were not the first to develop them, but did make advancements on the wheel and the chariot. They made use of pivot-able axles on their wagons, allowing easy turning. They were also one of the first armies to use the move-able siege tower and battering ram.

The application of mechanical engineering can be seen in the archives of various ancient societies. The pulley appeared in Mesopotamia in 1,500 BC, improving water transportation. German archaeologist Robert Koldewey found that the Hanging Gardens likely used a mechanical pump powered by these pulleys to transport water to the roof gardens. The Mesopotamians would advance even further by replacing "the substitution of continuous for intermittent motion, and the rotary for back-and-forth motion" by 1,200 BC.

In Ancient Egypt, the screw pump is another example of the use of engineering to boost efficiency of water transportation. Although the Early Egyptians built colossal structures such as the pyramids, they did not develop pulleys for the lifting of heavy stone, and used the wheel very little.

The earliest practical water-powered machines, the water wheel and watermill, first appeared in the Persian Empire, in what are now Iraq and Iran, by the early 4th century BC.

In Ancient Greece, Archimedes (287–212 BC) developed several key theories in the field of mechanical engineering including mechanical advantage, the Law of the Lever, and his name sake, Archimedes’ law. In Ptolematic Egypt, the Museum of Alexandria developed crane pulleys with block and tackles to lift stones. These cranes were powered with human tread wheels and were based on earlier Mesopotamian water-pulley systems. The Greeks would later develop mechanical artillery independently of the Chinese. The first of these would fire darts, but advancements allowed for stone to be tossed at enemy fortifications or formations.

== The Roman Empire ==
The Roman Empire developed a large number of mechanical devices and systems that had an impact on the future of engineering and, more specifically, mechanical engineering. The primary two fronts that the Romans became technologically advanced with were in the field of construction devices and in hydraulics. The developments made by the Roman Empire had a great impact on the progression of mechanics and influenced the civilizations following them into the modern era.

The Roman Empire became and remains famous for having an ability to create colossal structures that were in many ways ahead of their time. In the process of construction, giant stones or cements were used as building materials. In order to transport and hoist such materials to heights of, in some cases, 40 meters or above, the Romans both improved tools and equipment used by prior civilizations, like the Greeks, and invented their own mechanisms.

The A-frame structure of a Greco-Roman Trispastos ("Three-pulley-crane")

One of the major advancements made by the Romans was through the improvement of gear trains on cranes and pulleys, namely the A-frame crane. The A-frame crane had a relatively simple design with two supports angled to a point (in the shape of the letter “A”) and held in place by ropes or more supports. The material to be lifted was tethered to a rope that ran through one or more pulleys and connected to a lever or some other way to deliver the force. Early engineers based their advancement for this device on the knowledge that a larger gear ratio (4:1 rather than 1:1, for example) traded velocity for increased torque, allowing for larger objects to be hoisted with a lower input force.

Along with this, the Romans were able to improve the functionality of pulley systems by using different arrangements that would change the direction and magnitude of force output when lifting large stones or columns. In addition to the new mechanics of the A-frame crane, a new manner of generating the initial force for the crane was developed: workers placed within the rotating, hollow wheel (typically around 8 meters in diameter) of a treadwheel crane could generate a force by the action of their walking within the wheel rather than applying a force by hand to rotate the winch of the crane.

The Flavian Dynasty’s amphitheater (better known as the Roman Colosseum), measuring 48 meters in height and 544 meters in circumference, was mostly erected in approximately ten years (starting in 70-72 AD): a testament to their technological capabilities in that era. The most basic method likely used to transport materials, devices/tools, and people to the tops of structures like the Colosseum was through the distribution of loads throughout intricate systems of scaffolding. Along with these scaffolds, cranes were placed throughout the construction site to hoist materials as workers assisted transport by guiding blocks between scaffolds.

The Romans were also famous for their use of hydraulics, evident in another of their feats of construction: the aqueducts. The design of this vast system of water transportation was incredibly precise for the time, with the slope averaging negative 1/3,000 and reaching levels of negative 1/20,000 in some locations.

This precision in construction was accompanied by advancements in knowledge of hydraulic pressure, pipelines, and fluids that continue to have an influence in the modern day. The primary issue the Romans needed to overcome was with the flow rate of the water. In some aboveground sections of the aqueducts, an excess of water was a complication that could cause spillage of water. This was overcome by managing the flow rate, primarily through the changing of slope or addition of reservoirs.

Along with having to manage the flow rate throughout the aqueduct systems, the Romans also had to engineer ways to overcome the terrain. In order to overcome sudden drops or rises in terrain, an aboveground bridge could be constructed or, in some cases, an inverted siphon was used. A siphon works by using pressure to transport a fluid to a height greater than the initial reservoir and returning it back down to a height below the initial reservoir. The inverted siphon worked in a similar manner, but rather than transporting the fluid up and then down, the fluid descended a slope (a valley for example) and returned to an elevation somewhere between the lowest point of the siphon and the initial reservoir.

This technology continued to evolve into the hydraulics that are used in the modern era in the field of mechanical engineering.

The Romans also were able to use flowing water (like a river, for example) to power mills for grinding grain or processing stones. The flowing water turned a large wheel that would, in turn, rotate gears and grinders. The complication that arose from powering mills with water was inconsistent flow through the waterwheel. When powering a device with a natural source, changes in climate, temperature, and other factors can cause the mill to stop functioning. To overcome this, the Romans designed dams to manage the flow of water and provide consistent power to the water wheel. This is a technology that was new in that time and, in many ways influenced the continued development and exploration of using water as a source of power.

== Late Antiquity to early Middle Ages ==
In Roman Egypt, Heron of Alexandria (c. 10–70 AD) created the first steam-powered device, the Aeolipile. The first of its kind, it did not have the capability to move or power anything but its own rotation.

In China, Zhang Heng (78–139 AD) improved a water clock and invented a seismometer. Ma Jun (200–265 AD) invented a chariot with differential gears.

Leo the Philosopher is noted to have worked on a signal system using clocks in the Byzantine Empire in 850, connecting Constantinople with the Cilician Frontier and was a continuation of the complex city clocks in Eastern Rome. These grand machines diffused into the Arabian Empire under Harun al-Rashid.

Another grand mechanical device was the Organ, which was reintroduced in 757 when Constantine V gifted one to Pepin the short.

With the exception of a few machines, engineering and science stagnated in the West due to the collapse of the Roman Empire during late antiquity.

== Middle Ages ==
During the Islamic Golden Age (7th to 15th century), Muslim inventors made remarkable contributions in the field of mechanical technology. Al-Jazari, who was one of them, wrote his famous Book of Knowledge of Ingenious Mechanical Devices in 1206 and presented many mechanical designs. Al-Jazari is also the first known person to create devices such as the crankshaft and camshaft, which now form the basics of many mechanisms.

The earliest practical wind-powered machines, the windmill and wind pump, first appeared in the Muslim world during the Islamic Golden Age, in what are now Iran, Afghanistan, and Pakistan, by the 9th century AD. The earliest practical steam-powered machine was a steam jack driven by a steam turbine, described in 1551 by Taqi al-Din Muhammad ibn Ma'ruf in Ottoman Egypt.

The automatic flute player, which was invented in the 9th century by the Banū Mūsā brothers in Baghdad, is the first known example of a programmable machine. The work of the Banu Musa was influenced by their Hellenistic forebears, but it also makes significant improvements over Greek creation. The pinned-barrel mechanism, which allowed for programmable variations in the rhythm and melody of the music, was the key contribution given by the Banu Musa. In 1206, the Muslim inventor Al-Jazari (in the Artuqid Sultnate) described a drum machine which may have been an example of a programmable automaton.

The cotton gin was invented in India by the 6th century AD, and the spinning wheel was invented in the Islamic world by the early 11th century, both of which were fundamental to the growth of the cotton industry. The spinning wheel was also a precursor to the spinning jenny, which was a key development during the early Industrial Revolution in the 18th century. The crankshaft and camshaft were invented by Al-Jazari in Northern Mesopotamia circa 1206, and they later became central to modern machinery such as the steam engine, internal combustion engine and automatic controls.

The medieval Chinese horologist and engineer Su Song (1020–1101 AD) incorporated an escapement mechanism into his astronomical clock tower two centuries before escapement devices were found in medieval European clocks and also invented the world's first known endless power-transmitting chain drive.

The Middle Ages saw the wide spread adoption of machines to aid in labor. The many rivers of England and northern Europe allowed the power of moving water to be utilized. The water-mill became instrumental in the production of many goods such as food, fabric, leathers, and papers. These machines used were some of the first to use cogs and gears, which greatly increased the mills productivity. The camshaft allowed rotational force to be converted into directional force. Less significantly, tides of bodies of water were also harnessed.

Wind-power later became the new source of energy in Europe, supplementing the water mill. This advancement moved out of Europe into the Middle East during the Crusades.

Metallurgy advanced by a large degree during the Middle Ages, with higher quality iron allowing for more sturdy constructions and designs. Mills and mechanical power provided a consistent supply of trip-hammer strikes and air from the bellows.

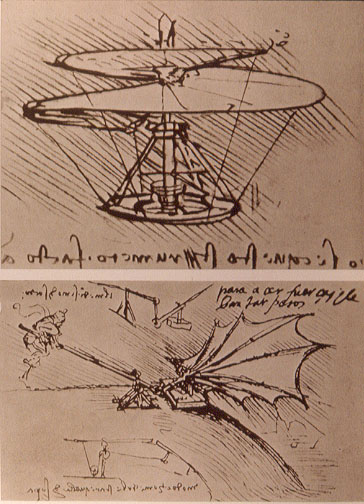
Da Vinci's flying machine concepts

== European Renaissance ==
During the 17th century, important breakthroughs in the foundations of mechanical engineering occurred in England. Sir Isaac Newton formulated Newton's Laws of Motion and developed Calculus, the mathematical basis of physics. Newton was reluctant to publish his works for years, but he was finally persuaded to do so by his colleagues, such as Sir Edmond Halley, much to the benefit of all mankind. Gottfried Wilhelm Leibniz is also credited with creating Calculus during this time period.

Leonardo Da Vinci was a notable engineer, designing and studying many mechanical systems that were focused around transportation and warfare His designs would later be compared to early aircraft design.

Although wind power provided a source of energy away from riverside estate and saw massive improvements in its harnessing, it could not replace the consistent and strong power of the watermill. Water would remain the primary source of power of pre-industrial urban industry through the Renaissance.

== Industrial Revolution ==
At the end of the Renaissance, scientists and engineers were beginning to experiment with steam power. Most of the early apparatuses faced problems of low horsepower, inefficiency, or danger. The need arose for an effective and economical power source because of the flooding of deep-mines in England, which could not be pumped out using alternative methods. The first working design was Thomas Savory's 1698 patent. He continuously worked on improving and marketing the invention across England. At the same time, others were working on improvements to Savory's design, which did not transfer heat effectively.

Thomas Newcomen would take all the advancements of the engineers and develop the Newcomen Atmospheric Engine. This new design would greatly reduce heat loss, move water directly from the engine, and allow variety of proportions to be built in.

The Industrial Revolution brought steam powered factories utilizing mechanical engineering concepts. These advances allowed an incredible increase in production scale, numbers, and efficiency.

During the 19th century, material sciences advances had begun to allow implementation of steam engines into Steam Locomotives and Steam-Powered Ships, quickly increasing the speed at which people and goods could move across the world. The reason for these advances were the machine tools were developed in England, Germany, and Scotland. These allowed mechanical engineering to develop as a separate field within engineering. They brought with them manufacturing machines and the engines to power them.

At the near end of the Industrial Revolution, internal combustion engine technology brought with it the piston airplane and automobile. Aerospace Engineering would develop in the early 20th century as a offshoot of mechanical engineering, eventually incorporating rocketry.

Coal was replaced by oil based derivatives for many applications.

== Modern Age ==
Electric car diagram

With the advents of computers in the 20th century, more precise design and manufacturing methods were available to engineers. Automated and Computerized manufacturing allowed many new fields to emerge from Mechanical Engineering such as Industrial Engineering. Although a majority of automobiles remain to be gas powered, electric vehicles have risen as a feasible alternative.

Because of the increased complexity of engineering projects, many disciplines of engineer collaborate and specialize in sub fields. One of these collaborations is the field of robotics, in which electrical engineers, computer engineers, and mechanical engineers can specialize in and work together.

=== Professional associations ===
The first British professional society of mechanical engineers was formed in 1847 Institution of Mechanical Engineers, thirty years after the civil engineers formed the first such professional society Institution of Civil Engineers.

In the United States, the American Society of Mechanical Engineers (ASME) was formed in 1880, becoming the third such professional engineering society, after the American Society of Civil Engineers (1852) and the American Institute of Mining Engineers (1871).

=== Education ===
The first schools in the United States to offer a mechanical engineering education were the United States Military Academy in 1817, an institution now known as Norwich University in 1819, and Rensselaer Polytechnic Institute in 1825. Education in mechanical engineering has historically been based on a strong foundation in mathematics and science.

In the 20th century, many governments began regulating both the title of engineer and the practice of engineering, requiring a degree from an accredited university and to pass a qualifying test.

== See also ==
- History of engineering
- History of chemical engineering
- History of electrical engineering
- History of structural engineering
- History of the steam engine
