= Henry Watts (chemist) =

English chemist

- Born: 20 January 1815; London
- Died: 30 June 1884 (aged 69)
- Education: B.A. University of London (1841)
- Known for: A Dictionary of Chemistry and the Allied Branches of other Sciences
- Spouse: Sophie Hanhart (m. 1854)
- Children: 10
- Scientific career
- Fields: Chemistry
- Institutions: University College London

Henry Watts (1815–1884) was an English chemist.

== Life ==
He was born in London on 20 January 1815. He went to a private school, and was articled at the age of fifteen as an architect and surveyor; but went on to support himself by teaching, chiefly mathematical, privately and at a school. He then attended University College, London. In 1841 he graduated B.A. in the University of London.

In 1846 he became assistant to George Fownes, professor of practical chemistry at University College, and occupied this post, after Fownes's death in 1849, until 1857, under Professor Alexander William Williamson. Having an impediment in speech he found himself unable to obtain a professorship, and worked on the literature of chemistry. In 1847 he was elected fellow of the Chemical Society.

On 17 December 1849 he was elected editor of the Chemical Society's Journal, and about the beginning of 1860 he also became librarian to the society. Early in 1871 it was decided to print in the society's journal abstracts of all papers on chemistry appearing elsewhere. In February 1871 a committee was appointed to superintend the publication of the journal and these summaries, but soon the abstracts were left entirely to Watts.

In 1866 Watts was elected Fellow of the Royal Society, and in 1879 he was elected Fellow of the Physical Society. He was an honorary member of the Pharmaceutical Society and life-governor of University College, London. He died on 30 June 1884. He had married in 1854 Sophie, daughter of Henri Hanhart, of Mülhausen in Alsace, by whom he had eight sons and two daughters.

== Works ==
In 1848 he was engaged by the Cavendish Society to translate into English and enlarge Leopold Gmelin's classic Handbuch der Chemie, a work which occupied much of his time till 1872, when the last of its eighteen volumes appeared. In 1863-67 he was co-author with Thomas Richardson of the last three volumes of the second edition of Chemical Technology, written by Friedrich Ludwig Knapp, Edmund Ronalds and Richardson. In 1858 he was engaged by Messrs. Longmans & Co. to prepare a new edition of the Dictionary of Chemistry and Mineralogy of Andrew Ure; but the book was obsolete, and he transformed it, with the help of a staff, into an encyclopædia of chemical science. The first edition of Watts's Dictionary of Chemistry, in five volumes, was completed in 1868; supplements were published in 1872, 1875, and 1879–81. The dictionary provided a basis for the standardization of modern chemical nomenclature. A new edition, revised and entirely rewritten by M. M. Pattison Muir and Henry Forster Morley, was published 1888–94, 4 vols.

Watts also edited the tenth, eleventh, twelfth, and thirteenth editions of Fownes's ‘Manual of Chemistry.’
