= History of chemical engineering =

Chemical engineering is a discipline that was developed out of those practicing "industrial chemistry" in the late 19th century. Before the Industrial Revolution (18th century), industrial chemicals and other consumer products such as soap were mainly produced through batch processing. Batch processing is labour-intensive and individuals mix predetermined amounts of ingredients in a vessel, heat, cool or pressurize the mixture for a predetermined length of time. The product may then be isolated, purified and tested to achieve a saleable product. Batch processes are still performed today on higher value products, such as pharmaceutical intermediates, specialty and formulated products such as perfumes and paints, or in food manufacture such as pure maple syrups, where a profit can still be made despite batch methods being slower and inefficient in terms of labour and equipment usage. Due to the application of Chemical Engineering techniques during manufacturing process development, larger volume chemicals are now produced through continuous "assembly line" chemical processes. The Industrial Revolution was when a shift from batch to more continuous processing began to occur. Today commodity chemicals and petrochemicals are predominantly made using continuous manufacturing processes whereas speciality chemicals, fine chemicals and pharmaceuticals are made using batch processes.

== Origin ==
The Industrial Revolution led to an unprecedented escalation in demand, both with regard to quantity and quality, for bulk chemicals such as soda ash. This meant two things: one, the size of the activity and the efficiency of operation had to be enlarged, and two, serious alternatives to batch processing, such as continuous operation, had to be examined.

== The first chemical engineer ==
Industrial chemistry was being practiced in the 1800s, and its study at British universities began with the publication by Friedrich Ludwig Knapp, Edmund Ronalds and Thomas Richardson of the important book Chemical Technology in 1848. By the 1880s the engineering elements required to control chemical processes were being recognized as a distinct professional activity. Chemical engineering was first established as a profession in the United Kingdom after the first chemical engineering course was given at the University of Manchester in 1887 by George E. Davis in the form of twelve lectures covering various aspects of industrial chemical practice. As a consequence George E. Davis is regarded as the world's first chemical engineer. In 1891 the world's first Bachelor's degrees in Chemical Engineering were granted at the Massachusetts Institute of Technology. Today, chemical engineering is a highly regarded profession. Chemical engineers with experience can become licensed Professional Engineers in the United States, aided by the National Society of Professional Engineers, or gain "Chartered" chemical-engineer status through the UK-based Institution of Chemical Engineers.

== Professional associations ==
In 1880, the first attempt was made to form a Society of Chemical Engineers in London. This eventually resulted in the formation of the Society of Chemical Industry in 1881. The American Institute of Chemical Engineers (AIChE) was founded in 1908, and the UK Institution of Chemical Engineers (IChemE) in 1922. These both now have substantial international membership. Some other countries now have chemical engineering societies or sections within chemical or engineering societies, but the AIChE, IChemE and IiChE remain the major ones in numbers and international spread: they are both open to suitably qualified professionals or students of chemical engineering anywhere in the world.

== Definitions ==
For the other established branches of engineering, there were ready associations in the public's mind: Mechanical Engineering meant machines, Electrical Engineering meant circuitry, and Civil Engineering meant structures. Chemical engineering came to mean chemicals production.

=== Unit operation ===
Arthur Dehon Little is credited with the approach chemical engineers to this day take: process-oriented rather than product-oriented analysis and design. The concept of unit operations was developed to emphasize the underlying similarity among seemingly different chemical productions. For example, the principles are the same whether one is concerned about separating alcohol from water in a fermenter, or separating gasoline from diesel in a refinery, as long as the basis of separation is generation of a vapor of a different composition from the liquid. Therefore, such separation processes can be studied together as a unit operation, in this case called distillation.

=== Unit processes ===
In the early part of the last century, a parallel concept called Unit Processes was used to classify reactive processes. Thus oxidations, reductions, alkylations, etc. formed separate unit processes and were studied as such. This was natural considering the close affinity of chemical engineering to industrial chemistry at its inception. Gradually however, the subject of chemical reaction engineering has largely replaced the unit process concept. This subject looks at the entire body of chemical reactions as having a personality of its own, independent of the particular chemical species or chemical bonds involved. The latter does contribute to this personality in no small measure, but to design and operate chemical reactors, a knowledge of characteristics such as rate behaviour, thermodynamics, single or multiphase nature, etc. are more important. The emergence of chemical reaction engineering as a discipline signaled the severance of the umbilical cord connecting chemical engineering to industrial chemistry and cemented the unique character of the discipline.

== See also ==
- George E. Davis
- Chemical Industry
- Chemical plant
- Commodity chemicals
- Speciality chemicals
- Fine chemicals
- Institution of Chemical Engineers
- Northeast of England Process Industry Cluster
