= History of engineering =

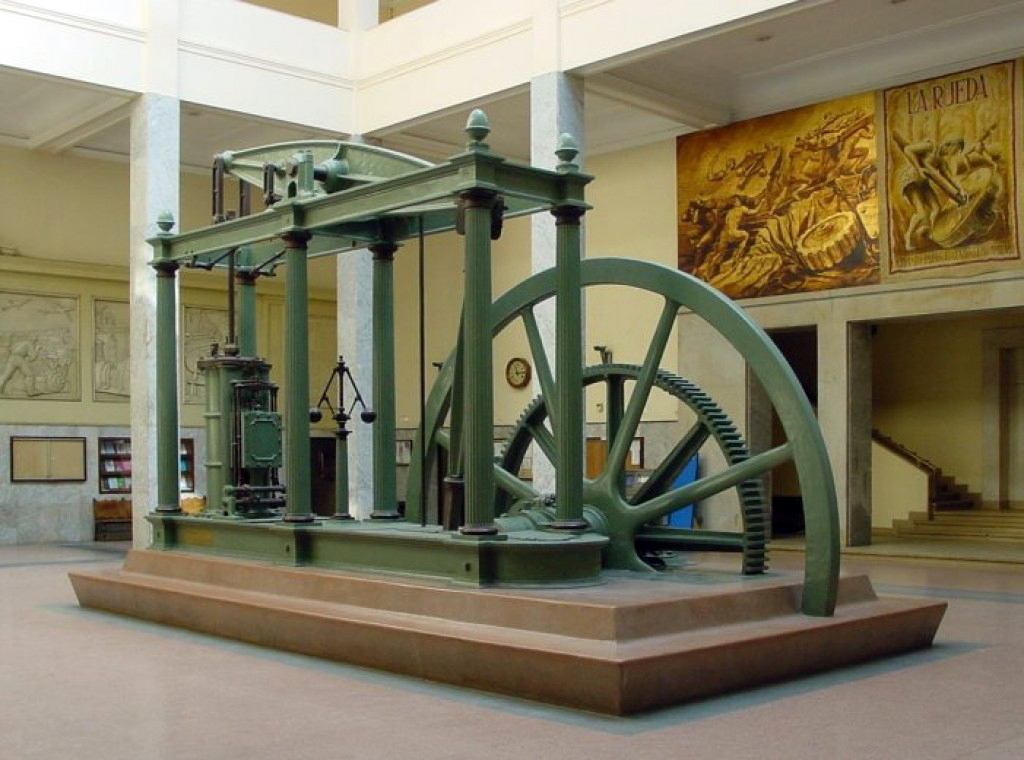
The Watt steam engine, a major driver in the Industrial Revolution, underscores the importance of engineering in modern history. This model is on display at the main building of the ETSII in Madrid, Spain.

The concept of engineering has existed since ancient times, as humans had already devised fundamental inventions such as the pulley, the lever, and the wheel. Each of these inventions sticks to the modern definition of engineering: exploiting basic mechanical principles to develop useful tools and objects.

== Etymology and meaning ==
The term engineering itself has a much more recent etymology, deriving from the word engineer, which itself dates back to 1325, when an engine'er (literally, one who operates an engine) originally referred to "a constructor of military engines." In this context, now obsolete, an "engine" referred to a military machine, i.e., a mechanical contraption used in war (for example, a catapult). The word "engine" itself is of even older origin, ultimately deriving from the Latin ingenium (c. 1250), meaning "innate quality, especially mental power, hence a clever invention."

Later, as the design of civilian structures such as bridges and buildings matured as a technical discipline, the term civil engineering entered the lexicon as a way to distinguish between those specializing in the construction of such non-military projects and those involved in the older discipline of military engineering (the original meaning of the word "engineering," now largely obsolete, with notable exceptions that have survived to the present day such as military engineering corps, e. g., the United States Army Corps of Engineers).

== Ancient era ==
The ziggurats of Mesopotamia, the Persepolis in Iran, the pyramids and Pharos of Alexandria in ancient Egypt, cities of the Indus Valley civilization, the Acropolis and Parthenon in ancient Greece, the aqueducts, Via Appia and Colosseum in the Roman Empire, Teotihuacán, the cities and pyramids of the Mayan, Inca and Aztec Empires, and the Great Wall of China, among many others, are examples of structures built by skilled engineers in ancient and pre-modern times.

The six classic simple machines were known in the ancient Near East. The wedge and the inclined plane (ramp) were known since prehistoric times. The wheel, along with the wheel and axle mechanism, was invented in Mesopotamia (modern Iraq) during the 5th millennium BC. The lever mechanism first appeared around 5,000 years ago in the Near East, where it was used in a simple balance scale, and to move large objects in ancient Egyptian technology. The lever was also used in the shadoof water-lifting device, the first crane machine, which appeared in Mesopotamia circa 3000 BC, and then in ancient Egyptian technology circa 2000 BC. The earliest evidence of pulleys date back to Mesopotamia in the early 2nd millennium BC, and ancient Egypt during the Twelfth Dynasty (1991-1802 BC). The screw, the last of the simple machines to be invented, first appeared in Mesopotamia during the Neo-Assyrian period (911-609) BC. The Egyptian pyramids were built using three of the six simple machines, the inclined plane, the wedge, and the lever, to create structures like the Great Pyramid of Giza.

The earliest architect known by name is Imhotep. As one of the officials of the Pharaoh, Djosèr, he probably designed and supervised the construction of the Pyramid of Djoser (a Step Pyramid) at Saqqara in Egypt around 2630-2611 BC. He may also have been responsible for the first known use of columns in architecture.

Kush developed the Sakia during the 4th century BC, which relied on animal power instead of human energy. Reservoirs in the form of hafirs were developed in Kush to boost irrigation. Sappers were employed to build causeways during military campaigns. Kushite ancestors built speos between 3700 and 3250 BC. Bloomeries and blast furnaces were also created during the Meroitic period.

The earliest practical water-powered machines, the water wheel and watermill, first appeared in the Persian Empire, in what are now Iraq and Iran, by the early 4th century BC.

Ancient Greece developed machines both in the civilian and military domains. The Antikythera mechanism, an early known model of a mechanical analog computer, and the mechanical inventions of Archimedes, are examples of Greek mechanical engineering. Some of Archimedes' inventions, as well as the Antikythera mechanism, required sophisticated knowledge of differential gearing or epicyclic gearing, two key principles in machine theory that helped design the gear trains of the Industrial Revolution and are still widely used today in fields such as robotics and automotive engineering.

Chinese and Roman armies employed complex military machines, including the ballista and catapult. In the Middle Ages, the trebuchet was developed. In 132, polymath Zhang Heng invented the seismoscope for detecting earthquakes, which was not invented anywhere else in the world until 1,100 years later.

Huan Tan's Xinlun is the earliest text to describe the trip hammer device powered by hydraulics (i.e., a water wheel), which was used to pound and decorticate grain.

== Middle Ages ==
=== Byzantine Empire ===
Byzantines translated and preserved many Greek manuscripts and made contributions to engineering in the early medieval world. Anthemius of Tralles and Isidore of Miletus were responsible for the architecture of the Hagia Sophia church in 532-537 CE.

Greek fire, invented by Callinicus of Heliopolis, was a weapon used by the Byzantines. It consisted of flammable substances such as petroleum, naphtha, quicklime, sulphur, resin, and potassium nitrate.

=== Islamic Golden Age ===
The Islamic Golden Age witnessed advances of engineering knowledge, after translating the works of Greek, Persian, Roman, and Indian scholars.

The earliest practical wind-powered machines, the windmill and wind pump, first appeared in the Muslim world during the Islamic Golden Age, in what are now Iran, Afghanistan, and Pakistan, by the 9th century AD. The earliest practical steam-powered machine was a steam jack steam turbine, described in 1551 by Taqi al-Din Muhammad ibn Ma'ruf in Ottoman Egypt.

The cotton gin was invented in India by the 6th century AD, and the spinning wheel was invented in the Islamic world by the early 11th century, both of which were fundamental to the growth of the cotton industry. The spinning wheel was also a precursor to the spinning jenny, which was a key development during the early Industrial Revolution in the 18th century.

After translating the works of Hero of Alexandria, by Qusta ibn Luqa, the earliest programmable machines were developed in the Muslim world. A music sequencer, a programmable musical instrument, was the earliest type of programmable machine. The first music sequencer was an automated flute player invented by the Banu Musa brothers, described in their Book of Ingenious Devices in the 9th century. In 1206, Al-Jazari invented programmable automata/robots. He described four automaton musicians, including drummers operated by a programmable drum machine, where they could be made to play different rhythms and different drum patterns.

Al-Jazari built five machines to pump water for the kings of the Turkish Artuqid dynasty and their palaces. Besides over 50 ingenious mechanical devices, Al-Jazari also developed and made innovations to segmental gears, mechanical controls, escapement mechanisms, clocks, robotics, and protocols for designing and manufacturing methods.

== European Renaissance ==
The first fully-functioning steam engine was built in 1716 by blacksmith Thomas Newcomen. The development of this device gave rise to the Industrial Revolution in the coming decades, allowing for the beginnings of mass production.

With the rise of engineering as a profession in the 18th century, the term became more narrowly applied to fields in which mathematics and science were applied to these ends. Similarly, in addition to military and civil engineering, the fields then known as the mechanic arts became incorporated into engineering.

The following images are samples from a deck of cards illustrating engineering instruments in England in 1702. They illustrate a range of engineering specializations, that would eventually become known as civil engineering, mechanical engineering, geodesy and geomatics, and so on.

Each card includes a caption explaining the purpose of the instrument:

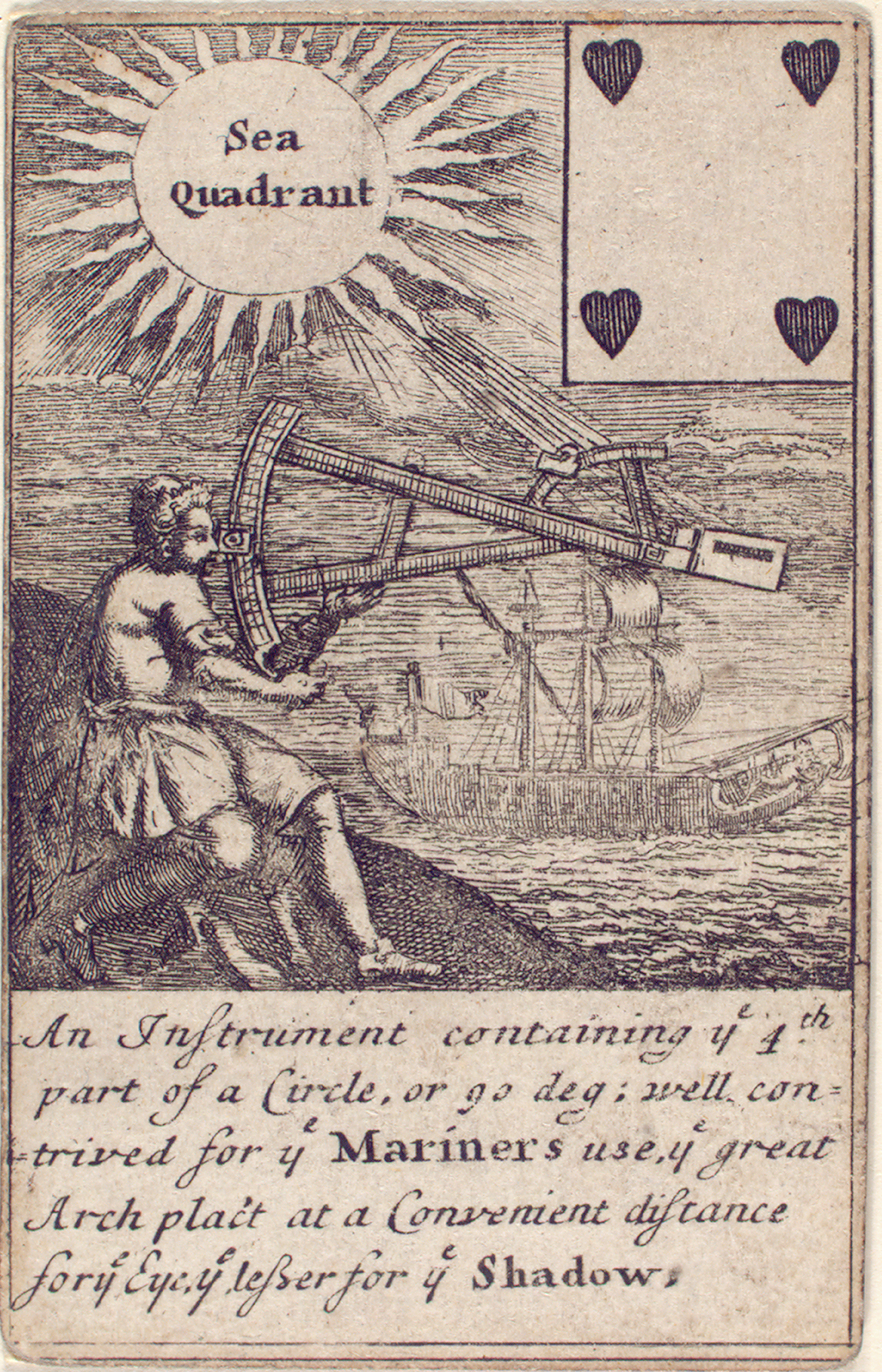
Four of hearts: Sea quadrant

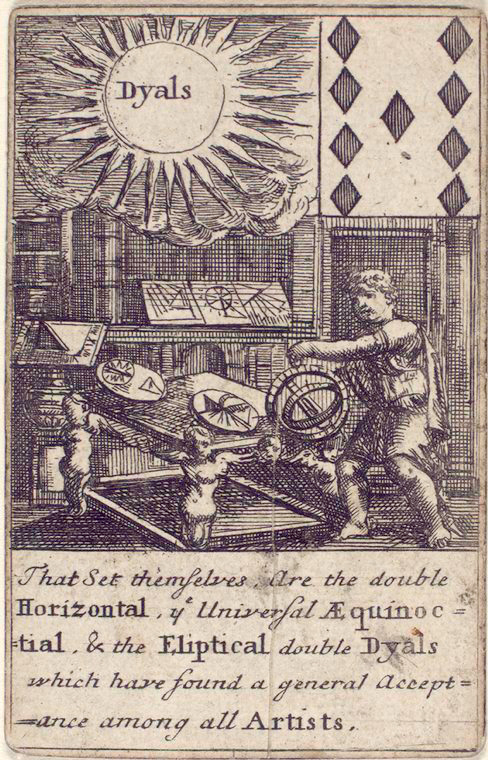
Nine of diamonds: Dyals (dials)

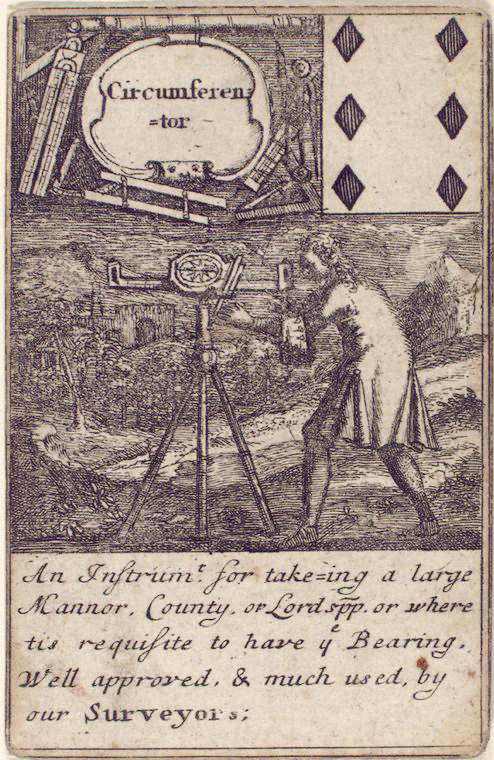
Six of diamonds: Circumferentor

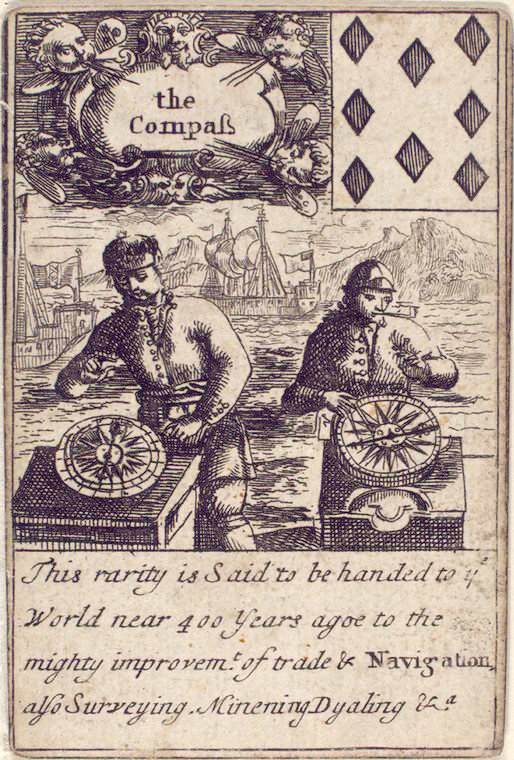
Eight of diamonds: the Compass

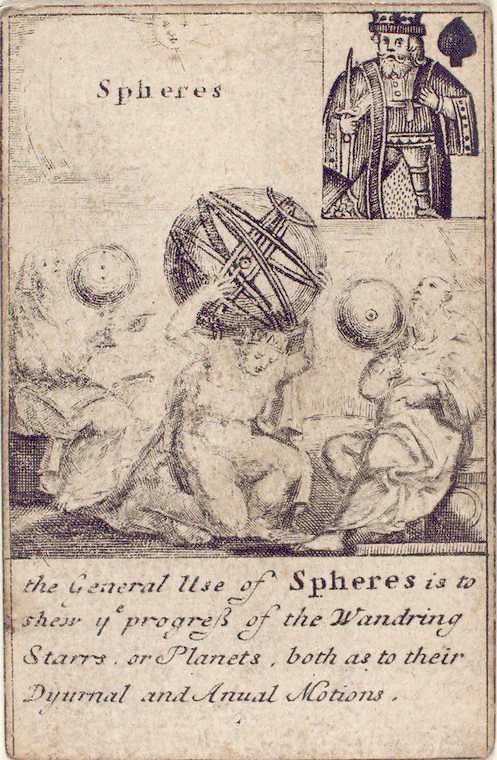
King of spades: Spheres

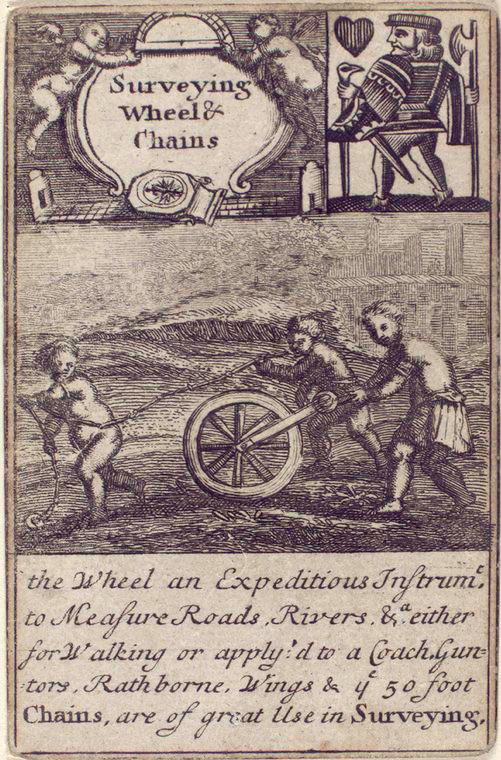
Knave of hearts: Surveying wheel and chains

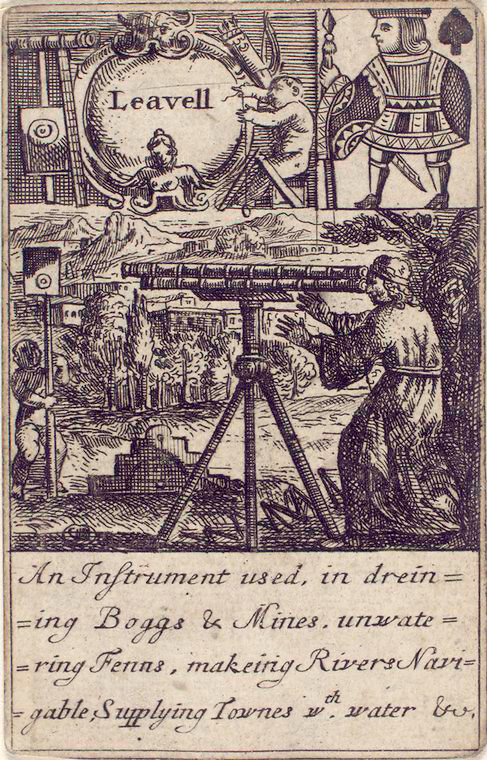
Knave of spades: Leavell

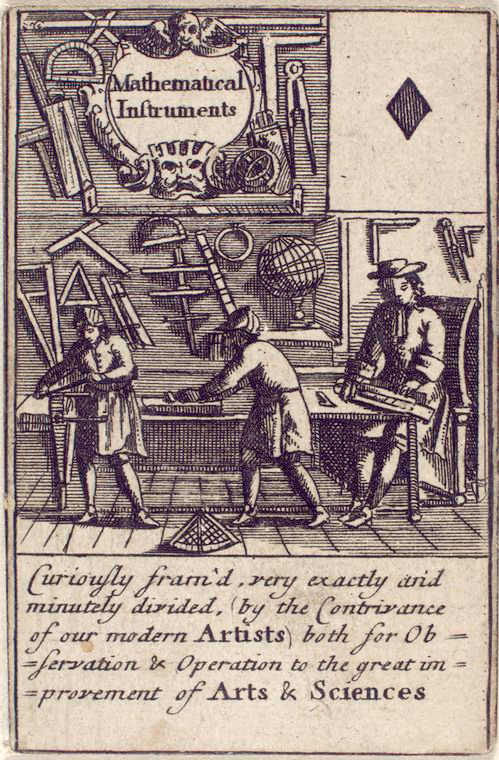
One of diamonds: Mathematical instruments

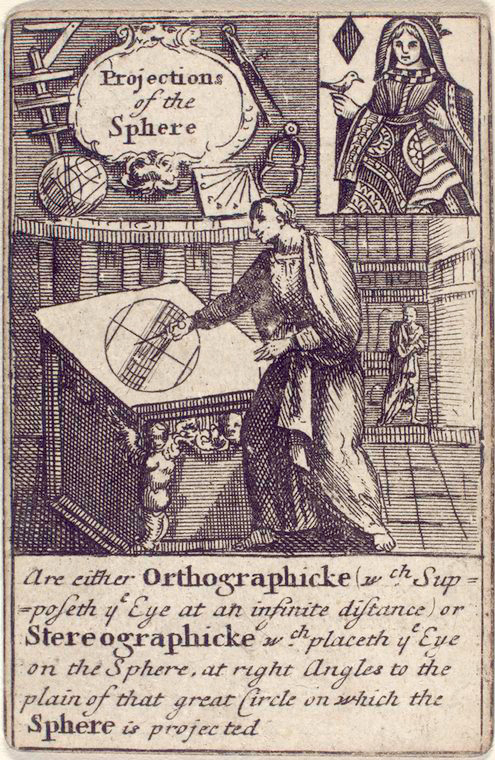
Queen of diamonds: Projections of the sphere

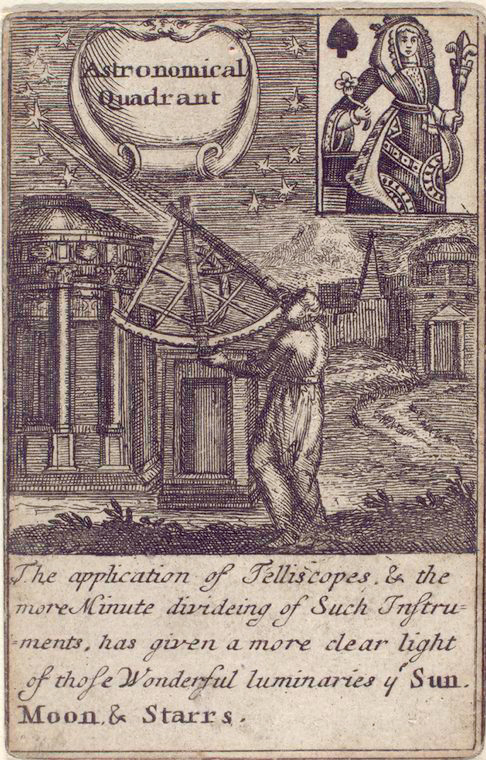
Queen of spades: Astronomical quadrant

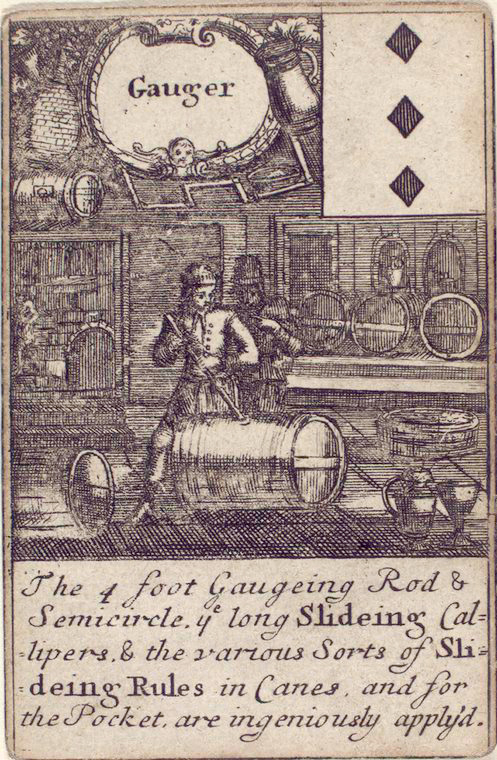
Three of diamonds: Gauger (gauges)

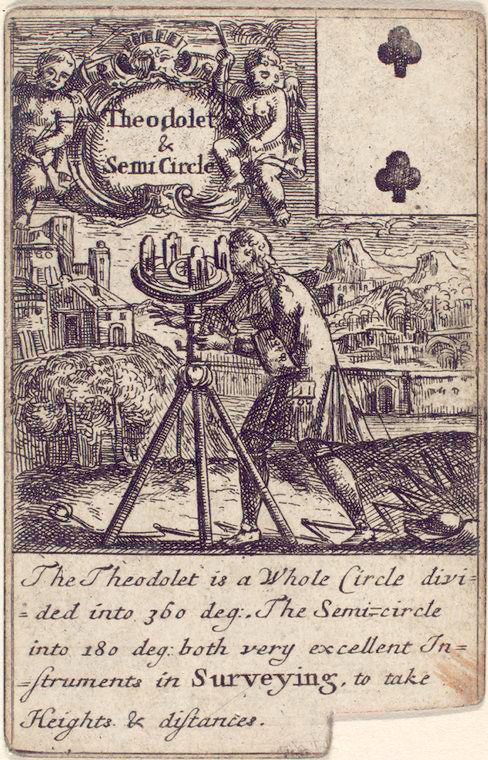
Two of clubs: Theodolet and semi-circle

== Modern era ==
The inventions of Thomas Savery and the Scottish engineer James Watt gave rise to modern mechanical engineering. The development of specialized machines and their maintenance tools during the Industrial Revolution led to the rapid growth of mechanical engineering, both in its birthplace of Britain and abroad.

The discipline of electrical engineering was shaped by the experiments of Alessandro Volta in the 19th century, the experiments of Michael Faraday, Georg Ohm and others and the invention of the electric motor in 1872. Electrical engineering became a profession late in the 19th century; the first professorship for Electrical Engineering was established in 1882 at Technische Universität Darmstadt in Germany. Practitioners created a global electric telegraph network. Although it is impossible to precisely pinpoint a first electrical engineer, Francis Ronalds, who created the first working electric telegraph system in 1816 and documented his vision of how the world could be transformed by electricity, has been named as a candidate.

The work of James Maxwell and Heinrich Hertz in the late 19th century gave rise to the field of electronics. The later inventions of the vacuum tube and the transistor further accelerated the development of electronics to such an extent that in the late 20th century, electrical and electronics engineers outnumbered their colleagues of any other engineering specialty.

Chemical engineering, like its counterpart mechanical engineering, developed in the 19th century during the Industrial Revolution. Industrial scale manufacturing demanded new materials and new processes; by 1880 the need for large scale production of chemicals was such that a new industry was created, dedicated to the development and large scale manufacturing of chemicals in new industrial plants. The role of the chemical engineer was the design of these chemical plants and processes. In 1891, the world's first Bachelor's degrees in Chemical Engineering were granted at the Massachusetts Institute of Technology.

Aeronautical engineering deals with aircraft design while aerospace engineering is a more modern term that includes spacecraft design. Its origins can be traced back to the aviation pioneers around the turn of the 20th century, although the work of Sir George Cayley has recently been dated as being from the last decade of the 18th century. Early knowledge of aeronautical engineering was largely empirical with some concepts and skills imported from other branches of engineering. Only a decade after the successful flights by the Wright brothers, the 1920s saw extensive development of aeronautical engineering through development of World War I military aircraft. Meanwhile, research to provide fundamental background science continued by combining theoretical physics with experiments.

The first PhD in engineering (technically, applied science and engineering) awarded in the United States went to Willard Gibbs at Yale University in 1863; it was also the second PhD awarded in science in the U.S.

== See also ==
- Timeline of historic inventions
- History of women in engineering
- History of chemical engineering
- History of electrical engineering
- History of structural engineering
