= Edmund Ronalds =

English academic and industrial chemist (1819–1889)

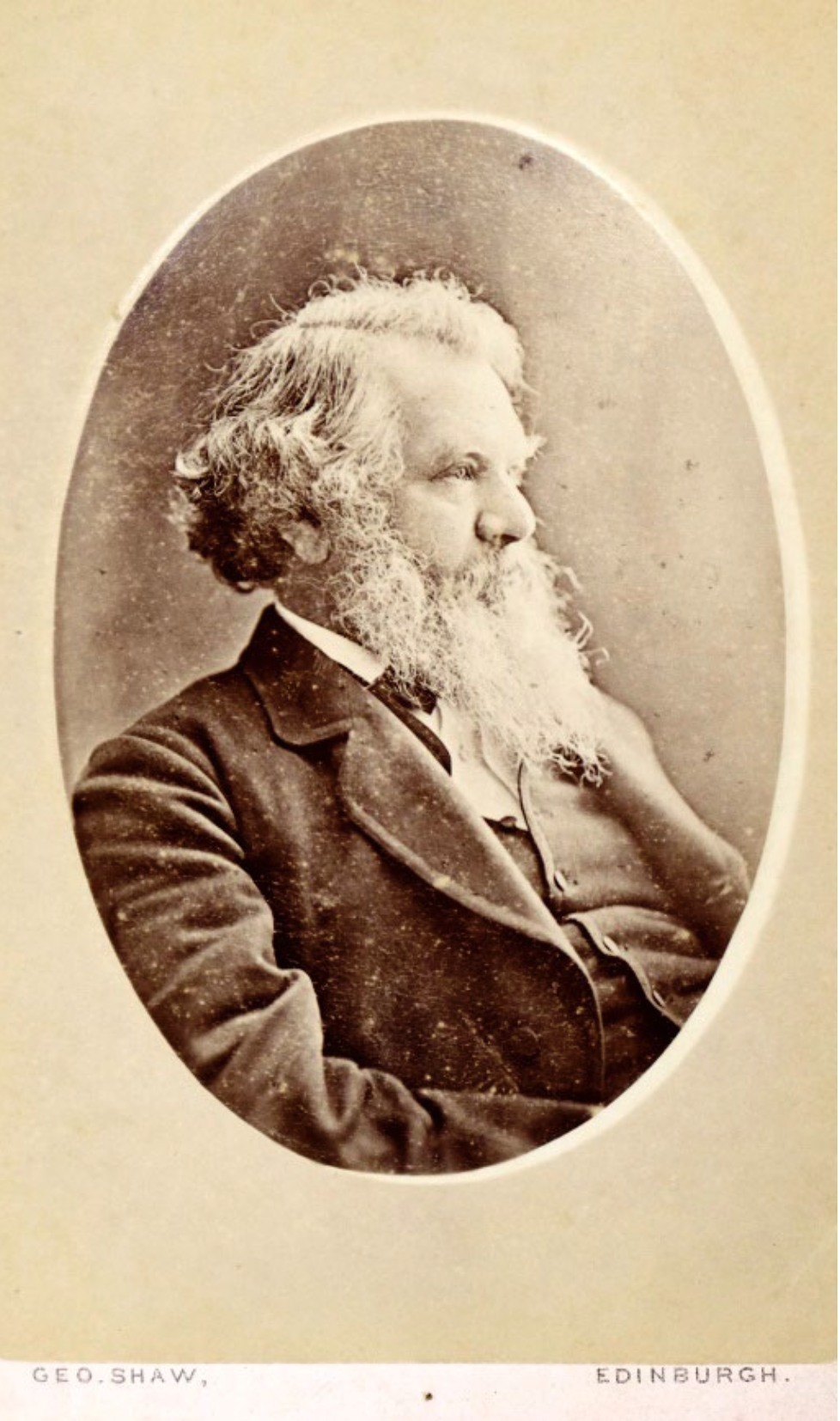
- Born: 18 June 1819; Islington, Middlesex, England
- Died: 9 September 1889 (aged 70); Leith, Scotland
- Occupations: academic, industrial
- Spouse: Barbara Christian Tennent (m. 1850)
- Children: 6
- Relatives: Francis Ronalds (uncle); Alfred Ronalds (uncle); Emily Ronalds (aunt)

Edmund Ronalds FCS FRSE (18 June 1819 – 9 September 1889) was an English academic and industrial chemist. He was co-author of a seminal series of books on chemical technology that helped begin university teaching of chemical applications for industry, and was a pioneer in the incorporation of advanced research into a manufacturing firm.

== Upbringing and family ==
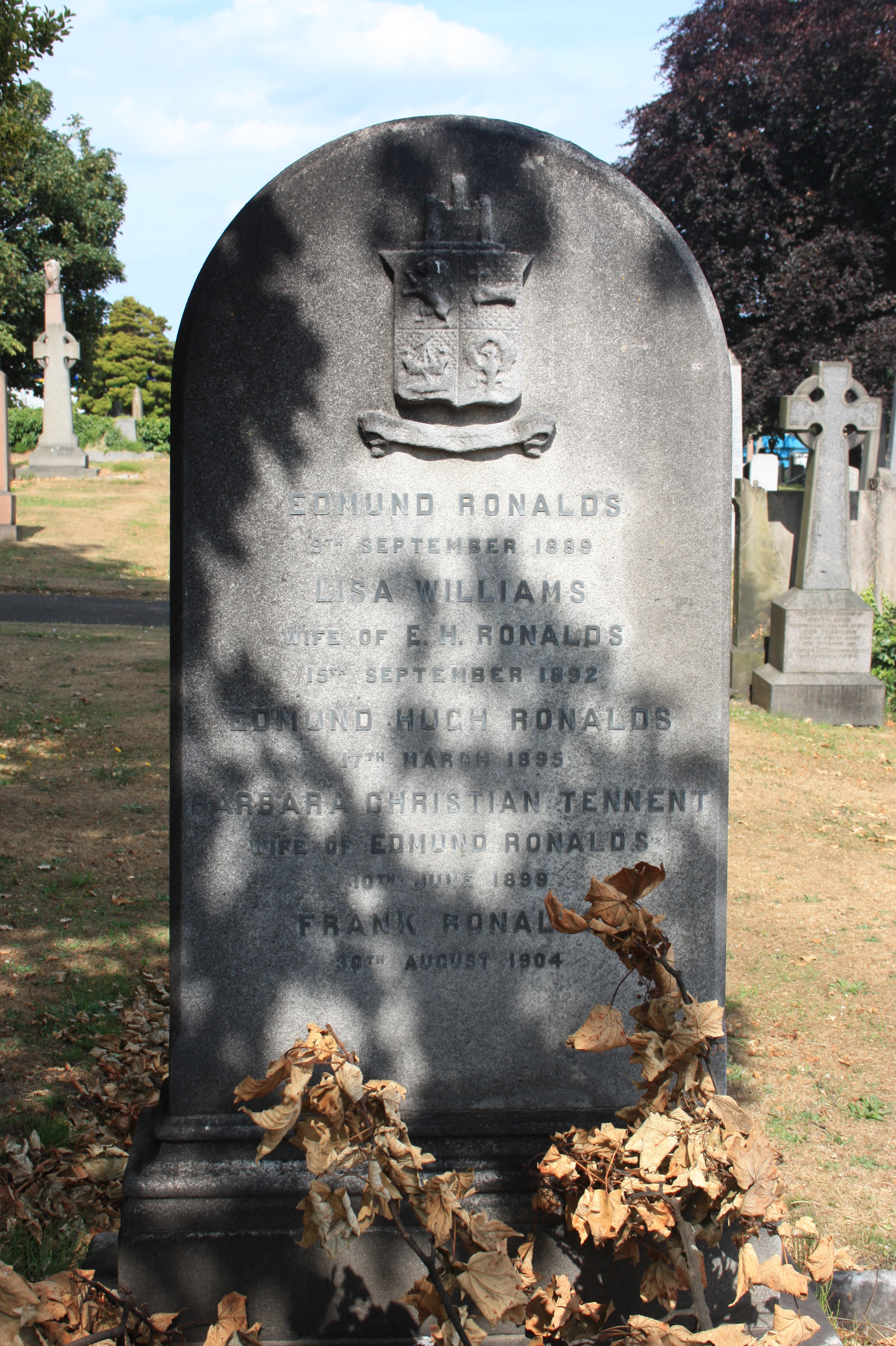
The grave of Edmund Ronalds in Rosebank Cemetery

He was born on 18 June 1819 at 48 Canonbury Square in Islington. His father Edmund Sr was a London cheesemonger and the brother of inventor Sir Francis Ronalds and his mother Eliza Jemima was the daughter of Dr James Anderson, who ran a respected school in Hammersmith. For most of his childhood the family lived at Brixton Hill but they returned to Islington in 1839 and resided at the east end of Canonbury Place.

He was the eldest of at least 12 children. Five of his siblings moved to New Zealand in the 1850s where his sisters married brothers of Harry Atkinson. Another sister spent her last years in Algiers. Two siblings married into Samuel Greg's cotton-spinning family.

== Education and career ==
Ronalds' university education was conducted principally in Germany. His key supervisors for his subsequent career were philosophy professor Jakob Friedrich Fries of the university of Jena, Gustav Magnus, the professor of physics and technology at the University of Berlin, and chemistry professor Justus von Liebig at the University of Giessen, where he was awarded his doctorate in 1842.

On returning home in 1842, he became assistant to Professor Thomas Graham at University College London. He then held lectureships in chemistry simultaneously at the Aldersgate Medical School and the Middlesex Hospital School of Medicine. In 1849 he was appointed as the inaugural professor of chemistry at Queen's College Galway (now NUI Galway).

Ronalds resigned his chair at Galway in 1856 to run the Bonnington Chemical Works, where the residues from the manufacture of coal gas at the Edinburgh gasworks were processed into valuable products. His partners in the company were John Tennant, eldest son of industrialist Charles Tennant, and John Tennent, whose father Hugh Tennent had helped run the Tennent family's Wellpark Brewery. Hugh Ronalds, a brother of Edmund Ronalds, later also became a partner at Bonnington. Edmund finally closed the works in 1878, when he was suffering extended ill health and Tennent and Tennant had died.

== Research and publication ==
Ronalds’ doctoral research was in the field of agricultural and physiological chemistry. Analysing wax by oxidation he created succinic acid, and published the results in Liebig's journal.

He discovered taurine in human bile, which was announced in the Chemical Gazette (1846). That same year his important paper on urine was read to the Royal Society: he found that urine contained sulphur and phosphorus in both unoxidised and oxidised states and quantified the amounts. The results were of value for clinical urine tests.

In 1848 he and Thomas Richardson translated and edited Friedrich Ludwig Knapp's book Chemical Technology. The first volumes of a much enlarged second edition were published in 1855. Later volumes in the period to 1867 were written by Richardson and Henry Watts, Ronalds having moved to Bonnington, and a third edition was published in 1889–1903. The book was recognised as a standard text and helped introduce the study of chemical technology at universities in Britain and beyond.

As secretary of the Chemical Society, he edited the first two volumes of the Journal of the Chemical Society for 1849 and 1850. In 1852 he published an analysis of the oil of the basking shark, emphasising its unusual and valuable properties.

While running the Bonnington works, he read a paper to the Royal Society of Edinburgh in 1864 on the volatile components of Pennsylvanian light petroleum. He isolated several simple hydrocarbons dissolved in the crude - ethane, propane and butane - and described the properties of the last, also for the first time. Other research conducted at the firm was published in Georg Lunge’s treatise on the distillation of coal tar.

When he retired from business, he established a private research laboratory which any chemist was welcome to use.

== Family and death ==
Ronalds married John Tennent's sister Barbara Christian Tennent on 23 December 1850 and they had three sons and three daughters. They advanced funding to enable their eldest son, chemist Edmund Hugh Ronalds, to purchase the Live Oak Plantation in Florida where he wintered each year. On his death, it passed to his brother Dr Tennent Ronalds, an obstetrician, who enjoyed hunting and fishing there and at the Orchard Pond Plantation he also purchased.

Ronalds died at his home Bonnington House, Leith (immediately north of Pilrig House) on 9 September 1889 and was buried in Rosebank Cemetery nearby; the grave is just south of the main eastwest path.
