= Parts stress modelling =

Parts stress modelling is a method in engineering and especially electronics to find an expected value for the rate of failure of the mechanical and electronic components of a system. It is based upon the idea that the more components that there are in the system, and the greater stress that they undergo in operation, the more often they will fail.

Parts count modelling is a simpler variant of the method, with component stress not taken into account.

Various organisations have published standards specifying how parts stress modelling should be carried out. Some from electronics are:

- MIL-HDBK-217 (US Department of Defense)
- SR-332, Reliability Prediction Procedure for Electronic Equipment
- HRD-4 (British Telecom)
- SR-1171, Methods and Procedures for System Reliability Analysis
- and many others

These "standards" produce different results, often by a factor of more than two, for the same modelled system. The differences illustrate the fact that this modelling is not an exact science. System designers often have to do the modelling using a standard specified by a customer, so that the customer can compare the results with other systems modelled in the same way.

All of these standards compute an expected overall failure rate for all the components in the system, which is not necessarily the rate at which the system as a whole fails. Systems often incorporate redundancy or fault tolerance so that they do not fail when an individual component fails.

Several companies provide programs for performing parts stress modelling calculations. It's also possible to do the modelling with a spreadsheet.

All these models implicitly assume the idea of "random failure". Individual components fail at random times but at a predictable rate, analogous to the process of nuclear decay. One justification for this idea is that components fail by a process of wearout, a predictable decay after manufacture, but that the wearout life of individual components is scattered widely about some very long mean. The observed "random" failures are then just the extreme outliers at the early edge of this distribution. However, this may not be the whole picture.

All the models use basically the same process, with detailed variations.

- Identify the components in the system
  - Such as R123, 10kOhm carbon film resistor
- For each component, determine the component model to use from the standard
  - Such as "resistor, film, < 1 Megohm" or "Connector, multi-pin"
- From the standard's component model, discover what, if any, complexity parameter is needed, and find the value of that parameter for this component
  - Such as pin count for a connector or gate count for a chip
- From the standard's component model, discover what thermal stress curve applies, and find the value of the temperature in operation for this component
  - The failure rate of connectors may change little with temperature, while that of capacitors may change greatly
- From the standard's component model, discover what, if any, part stress parameter is needed, what part stress curve applies, and find the value of that part stress parameter for this component in this application
  - A part stress might be the applied power as a fraction of the component's rated power, or the applied voltage as a fraction of the rated voltage
- From the standard's component model, find the base failure rate for this component, and modify that according to the complexity parameter, the operating temperature and thermal stress curve, the part stress parameter and part stress curve, with arithmetic specified by the standard. This now is the expected failure rate for this component in this application
- Add up all the results for every component in the system to find the overall failure rate for all components in this system.

Other global modification parameters can be employed, which are assumed to have the same effect on every component failure rate. The most usual are the environment, such as ground benign or airborne, commercial, and the purchasing quality assurance process. The standards specify overall multiplier factors for these various choices.
