= Thomas Richardson (chemist) =

English industrial chemist and industrial historian

Thomas Richardson FRS FRSE MRIA AICE (1816–1867) was an English industrial chemist, and industrial historian.

== Life ==
Born on 8 October 1816 in Newcastle-upon-Tyne, he was educated there. Around 1830 he went to Glasgow University, to study Chemistry under Prof Thomas Thomson. Richardson then went to the University of Giessen, where, under Prof Justus von Liebig, he carried out researches on the composition of coal and the use of lead chromate in organic analysis, gaining a doctorate (Ph.D.). He later went to Paris with Thomson, and completed his studies under Jules Pelouze.

On his return to Newcastle, Richardson became a specialist in manufacturing chemistry, taking out a number of patents for processes. In 1840 he began, at Blaydon, near Newcastle, to remove the impurities, consisting chiefly of antimony, from "hard" lead, and thus to convert it into "soft" lead, by means of a current of air driven over the molten metal; the impurities were oxidised, floated to the surface, and were then skimmed off. Practical improvements introduced into the process by George Burnett soon after led to the annual importation of several thousand tons of Spanish hard lead into the Tyne district, where it was purified. John Percy brought forward evidence that Richardson was not the inventor of this process, quoting a letter from James Leathart, and stating that a patent for it was granted to Walter Hall in 1814.

In 1844 Richardson began at Blaydon the manufacture of superphosphates, as suggested by Liebig, and already begun in 1842 in the south of England, by John Lawes. In 1848 he patented a method for condensing "lead-fume" by means of steam, originally suggested by Richard Watson. In the winter session of 1848 he became lecturer on chemistry in the Newcastle school of medicine and surgery. After the temporary disruption of the school in 1851, he joined the school continued by the majority of the lecturers, which became connected in the same year with the University of Durham.

In June 1856 Richardson was made lecturer on chemistry in the university of Durham, and the degree of M.A. was conferred on him by that university. Richardson became an associate of the Institution of Civil Engineers on 3 May 1864, was elected Fellow of the Royal Society on 7 June 1866, and fellow of the Royal Society of Edinburgh in the same year. He was also a member of the Royal Irish Academy.

Richardson died of apoplexy in Wigan on 10 July 1867.

== Works ==
With Pelouze he published, in 1838, a research on the action of water on cyanogen and the consequent formation of azulmic acid (i.e. oligomers of hydrogen cyanide that are insoluble in water).

In 1847, together with Edmund Ronalds, he began to translate Friedrich Ludwig Knapp's Technological Chemistry, which was published between 1848 and 1851. A second edition, in five parts, published in 1855, was rewritten so as to form a new work. Henry Watts replaced Ronalds as Richardson's collaborator for the last three of the five parts; and the book, which was recognised as a standard work, was incorporated by Charles Edward Groves and William Thorp in their Chemical Technology.

In 1855, together with Thomas John Taylor, he began to collect information on the history of the chemical industries of the Tyne district. He was helped later by James Cochran Stevenson, R. C. Clapham, and by Thomas Sopwith, and published in collaboration two reports on the subject in the Report of the British Association for 1863. These were incorporated in a book on The Industrial Resources of … the Tyne, Wear, and Tees, edited by himself, William Armstrong, Isaac Lowthian Bell, and John Taylor; two editions appeared in 1864.

He published, with Armstrong and James Longridge, three major reports (dated 25 August 1857 and 16 January 1858) on the use of the Steam Coals of the Hartley District of Northumberland in Steam-Boilers, addressed to the Steam Collieries Association of Newcastle-on-Tyne. The reports contain a record of a large and carefully conducted series of experiments; the conclusions were opposed to those of Sir Henry Thomas de la Beche and Lyon Playfair, on whose recommendation Welsh steam coal had been exclusively adopted by the navy. Richardson's reports were republished in 1859, together with T. W. Miller and R. Taplin's Report … on Hartley Coal. About 1866 Richardson carried out, with Lavington E. Fletcher at Kirklees, near Wigan, a similar series of experiments, which were published in 1867 as Experiments … [on] the Steam Coals of Lancashire and Cheshire.

Richardson published fifteen independent papers and six in collaboration with E. J. J. Browell (a fellow lecturer at the Newcastle school of medicine, and partner), John Lee, Pelouze, Sopwith, and Robert Dundas Thomson, on chemical questions.

== Notes ==
Attribution

This article incorporates text from a publication now in the public domain: "Richardson, Thomas (1816-1867)". Dictionary of National Biography. London: Smith, Elder & Co. 1885–1900.
