= Friedrich Ludwig Knapp =

German chemist (1814–1904)

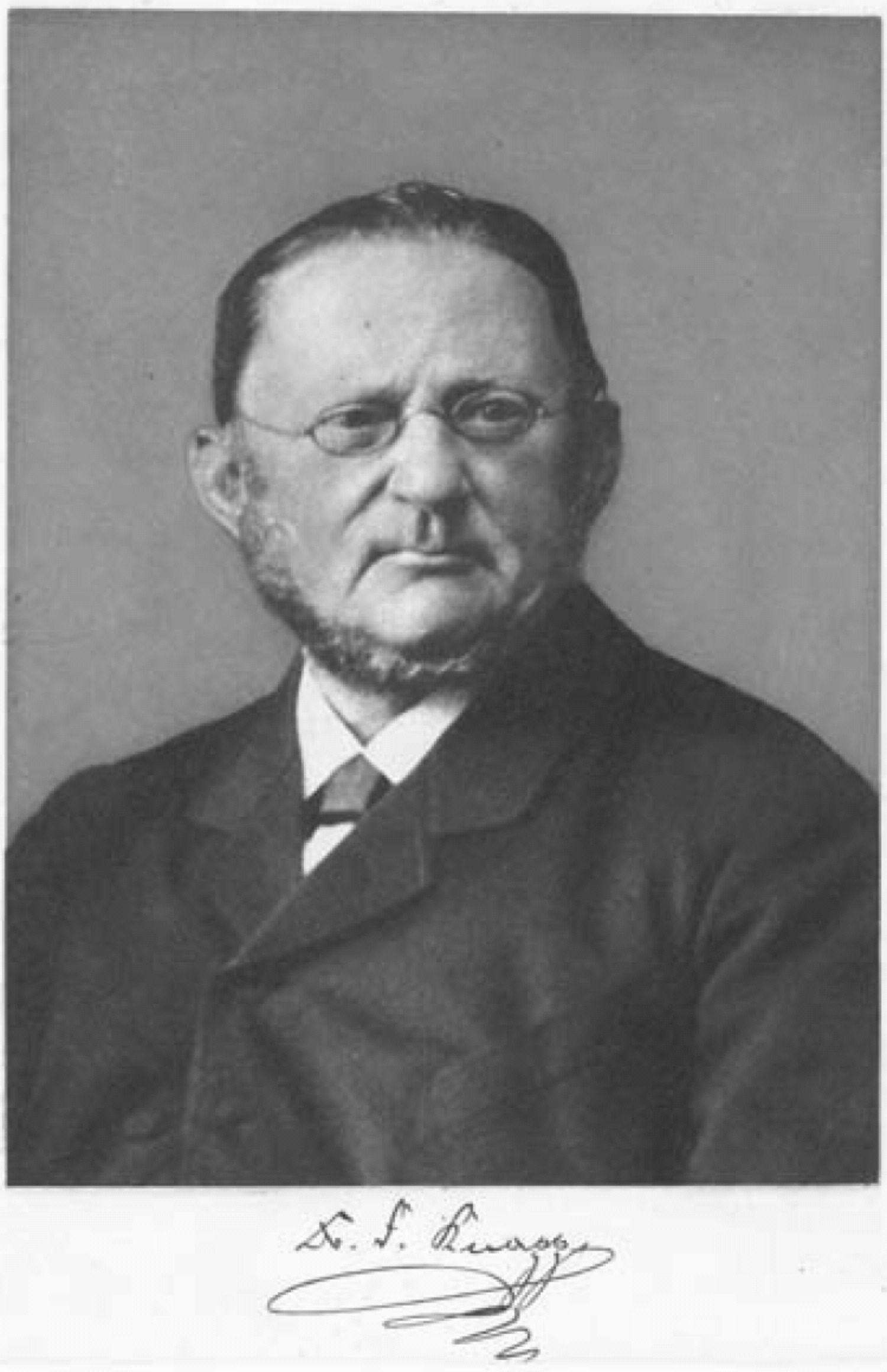
Friedrich Ludwig Knapp

Friedrich Ludwig Knapp (February 22, 1814, Michelstadt, Grand Duchy of Hesse – June 8, 1904, Braunschweig) was a German chemist. He was the father of economist Georg Friedrich Knapp and the grandfather of social reformer Elly Heuss-Knapp.

== Biography ==
He trained as a pharmacist in Darmstadt, then studied chemistry under Justus von Liebig at the University of Giessen (whose sister Katharina Elisabeth Liebig he married in 1841). He worked at the mint in Paris as an assayer, and in 1841 became an associate professor of technology at Giessen. From 1847 to 1853 he was a full professor at the university, then relocated to Munich, where he became a technical director at the Nymphenburg Porcelain Manufactory. In 1863 he went to Brunswick (German: Braunschweig) to teach classes in chemistry at the polytechnic school.

He made some notable investigations relative to tanning; in 1847 he was the first to describe chromium tanning. He also made contributions in regards to the technology of pottery, mortar, lime, etc.

== Works ==
- Lehrbuch der chemischen Technologie (2 vols., Brunswick, 1847; translated into English by Edmund Ronalds and Thomas Richardson, 3 vols., London, 1848–51, and by W. R. Johnson, 2 vols., Philadelphia, 1848–49) : "Chemical technology; or, Chemistry, applied to the arts and to manufactures" (1848–51).
- John Percy, Metallurgy, translator (1862)
- Mineralgerbung mit metall-salzen und Verbindungen aus diesen mit organischen Substanzen als gerbemittel, (1892).
