= History of structural engineering =

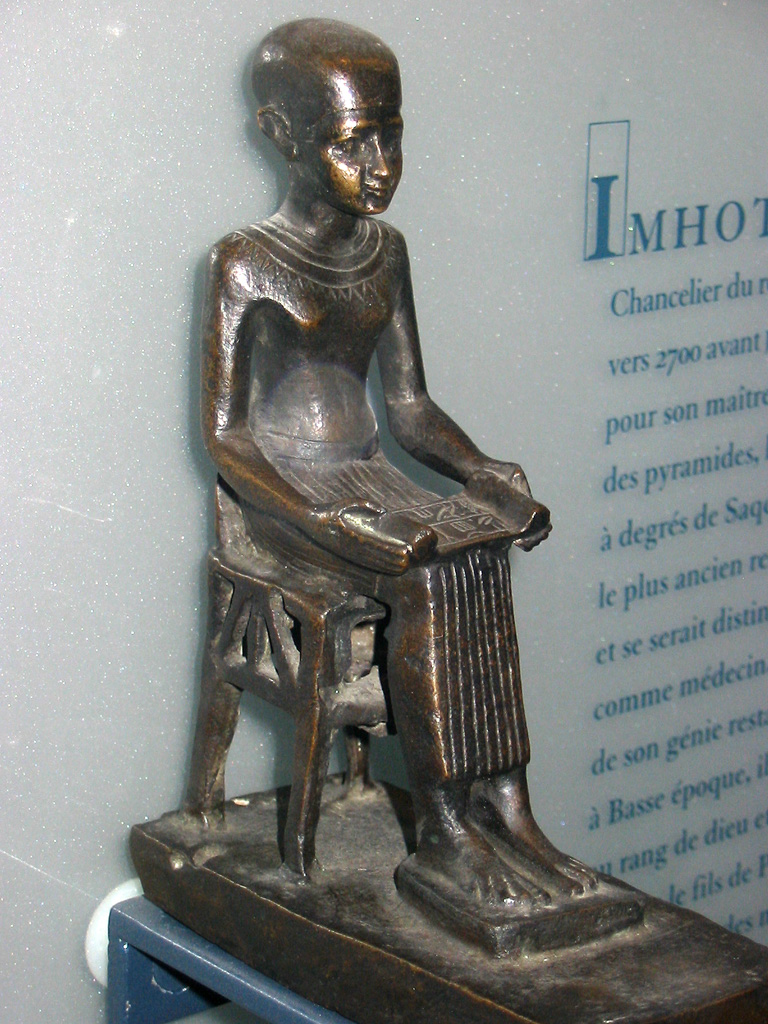
Statuette of Imhotep, in the Louvre, Paris, France

The history of structural engineering dates back to at least 2700 BC when the step pyramid for Pharaoh Djoser was built by Imhotep, the first architect in history known by name. Pyramids were the most common major structures built by ancient civilizations because it is a structural form which is inherently stable and can be almost infinitely scaled (as opposed to most other structural forms, which cannot be linearly increased in size in proportion to increased loads).

Another notable engineering feat from antiquity still in use today is the qanat water management system. Qanat technology developed in the time of the Medes, the predecessors of the Persian Empire (modern-day Iran which has the oldest and longest Qanat (older than 3000 years and longer than 71 km) that also spread to other cultures having had contact with the Persian.

Throughout ancient and medieval history most architectural design and construction was carried out by artisans, such as stone masons and carpenters, rising to the role of master builder. No theory of structures existed and understanding of how structures stood up was extremely limited, and based almost entirely on empirical evidence of 'what had worked before'. Knowledge was retained by guilds and seldom supplanted by advances. Structures were repetitive, and increases in scale were incremental.

No record exists of the first calculations of the strength of structural members or the behaviour of structural material, but the profession of structural engineer only really took shape with the Industrial Revolution and the re-invention of concrete (see History of concrete). The physical sciences underlying structural engineering began to be understood in the Renaissance and have been developing ever since.

== Early structural engineering ==
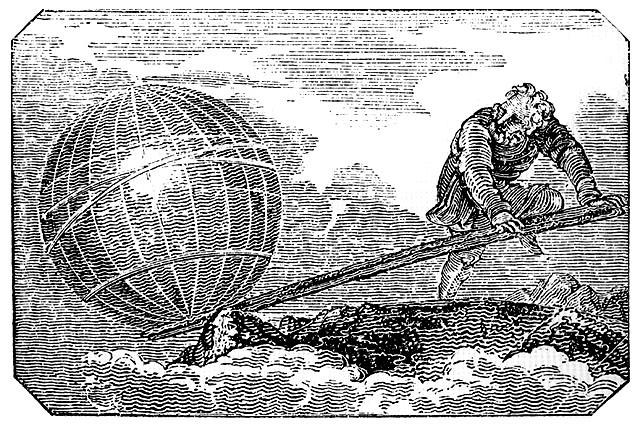
Archimedes is said to have remarked about the lever: "Give me a place to stand on, and I will move the Earth."

The recorded history of structural engineering starts with the ancient Egyptians. In the 27th century BC, Imhotep was the first structural engineer known by name and constructed the first known step pyramid in Egypt. In the 26th century BC, the Great Pyramid of Giza was constructed in Egypt. It remained the largest man-made structure for millennia and was considered an unsurpassed feat in architecture until the 19th century AD.

The understanding of the physical laws that underpin structural engineering in the Western world dates back to the 3rd century BC, when Archimedes published his work On the Equilibrium of Planes in two volumes, in which he sets out the Law of the Lever, stating:

Equal weights at equal distances are in equilibrium, and equal weights at unequal distances are not in equilibrium but incline towards the weight which is at the greater distance.

Archimedes used the principles derived to calculate the areas and centers of gravity of various geometric figures including triangles, paraboloids, and hemispheres. Archimedes's work on this and his work on calculus and geometry, together with Euclidean geometry, underpin much of the mathematics and understanding of structures in modern structural engineering.

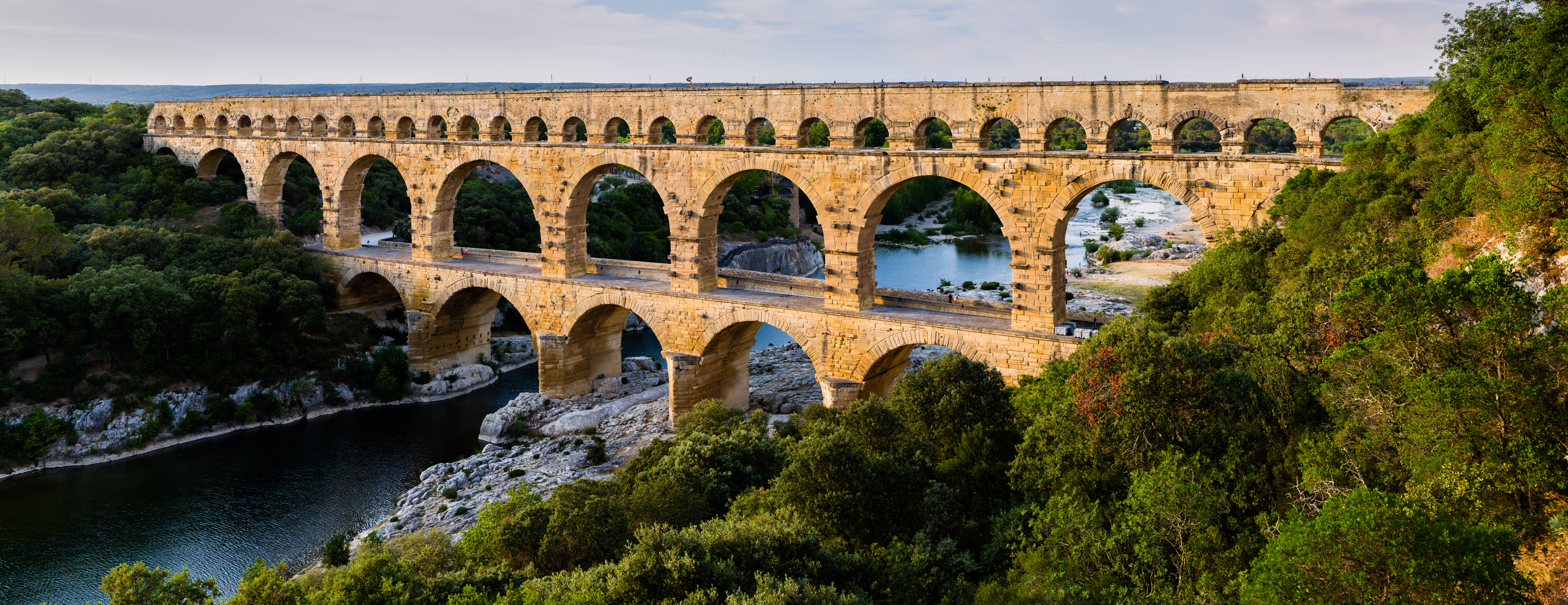
Pont du Gard, France, a Roman era aqueduct circa 19 BC.

The ancient Romans made great bounds in structural engineering, pioneering large structures in masonry and concrete, many of which are still standing today. They include aqueducts, thermae, columns, lighthouses, defensive walls and harbours. Their methods are recorded by Vitruvius in his De Architectura written in 25 BC, a manual of civil and structural engineering with extensive sections on materials and machines used in construction. One reason for their success is their accurate surveying techniques based on the dioptra, groma and chorobates.

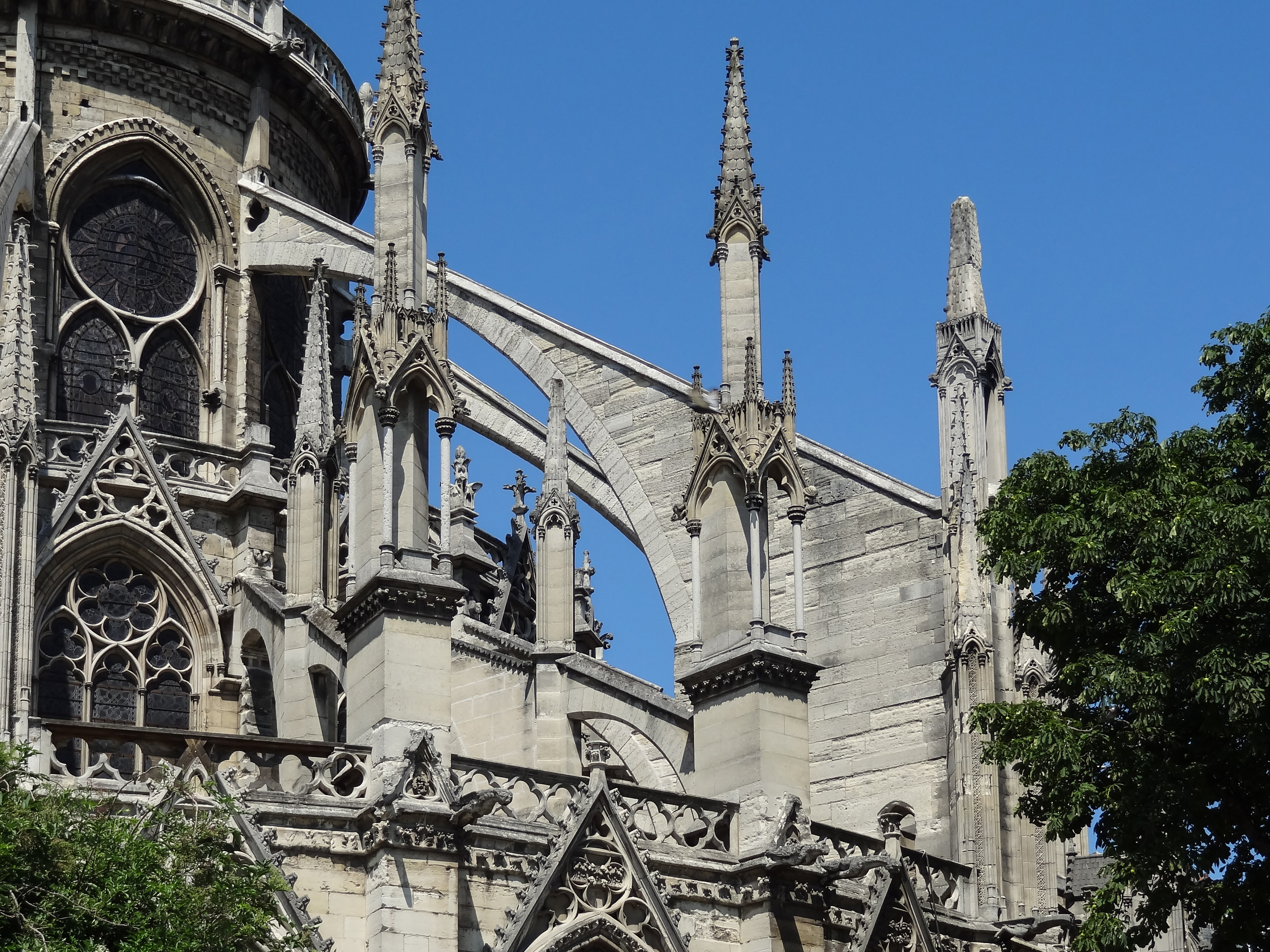
Flying buttress at Notre Dame Cathedral (1163–1345)

During the High Middle Ages (11th to 14th century) builders were able to balance the side thrust of vaults with that of flying buttresses and side vaults, to build tall spacious structures, some of which were built entirely of stone (with iron pins only securing the ends of stones) and have lasted for centuries.

In the 15th and 16th centuries and despite lacking beam theory and calculus, Leonardo da Vinci produced many engineering designs based on scientific observations and rigour, including a design for a bridge to span the Golden Horn. Though dismissed at the time, the design has since been judged to be both feasible and structurally valid.

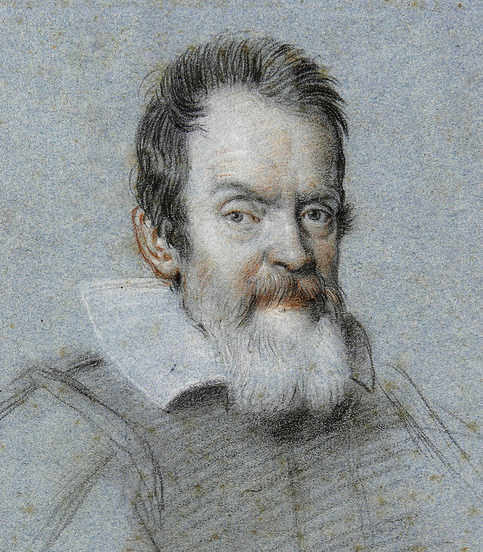
Galileo Galilei. Portrait in crayon by Leoni

The foundations of modern structural engineering were laid in the 17th century by Galileo Galilei, Robert Hooke and Isaac Newton with the publication of three great scientific works. In 1638 Galileo published Dialogues Relating to Two New Sciences, outlining the sciences of the strength of materials and the motion of objects (essentially defining gravity as a force giving rise to a constant acceleration). It was the first establishment of a scientific approach to structural engineering, including the first attempts to develop a theory for beams. This is also regarded as the beginning of structural analysis, the mathematical representation and design of building structures.

This was followed in 1676 by Robert Hooke's first statement of Hooke's law, providing a scientific understanding of elasticity of materials and their behaviour under load.

Eleven years later, in 1687, Sir Isaac Newton published Philosophiae Naturalis Principia Mathematica, setting out his laws of motion, providing for the first time an understanding of the fundamental laws governing structures.

Also in the 17th century, Sir Isaac Newton and Gottfried Leibniz both independently developed the fundamental theorem of calculus, providing one of the most important mathematical tools in engineering.

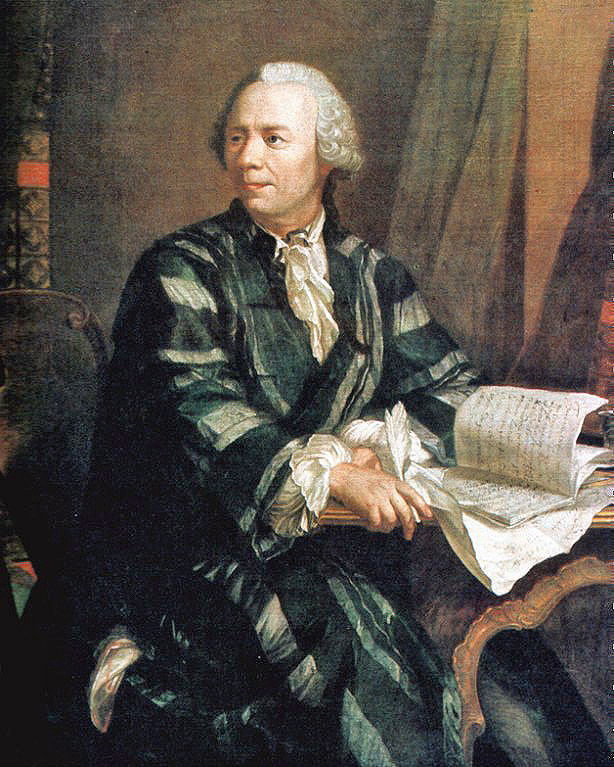
Leonhard Euler portrait by Johann Georg Brucker

Further advances in the mathematics needed to allow structural engineers to apply the understanding of structures gained through the work of Galileo, Hooke and Newton during the 17th century came in the 18th century when Leonhard Euler pioneered much of the mathematics and many of the methods which allow structural engineers to model and analyse structures. Specifically, he developed the Euler–Bernoulli beam equation with Daniel Bernoulli (1700–1782) circa 1750 - the fundamental theory underlying most structural engineering design.

Daniel Bernoulli, with Johann (Jean) Bernoulli (1667–1748), is also credited with formulating the theory of virtual work, providing a tool using equilibrium of forces and compatibility of geometry to solve structural problems. In 1717 Jean Bernoulli wrote to Pierre Varignon explaining the principle of virtual work, while in 1726 Daniel Bernoulli wrote of the "composition of forces".

In 1757 Leonhard Euler went on to derive the Euler buckling formula, greatly advancing the ability of engineers to design compression elements.

== Modern developments in structural engineering ==
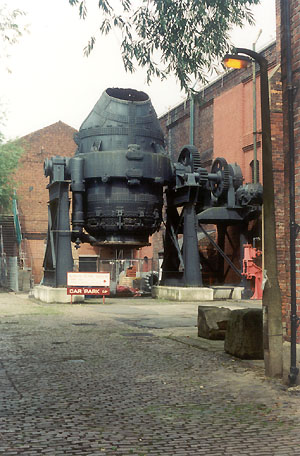
Bessemer converter, Kelham Island Museum, Sheffield, England (2002)

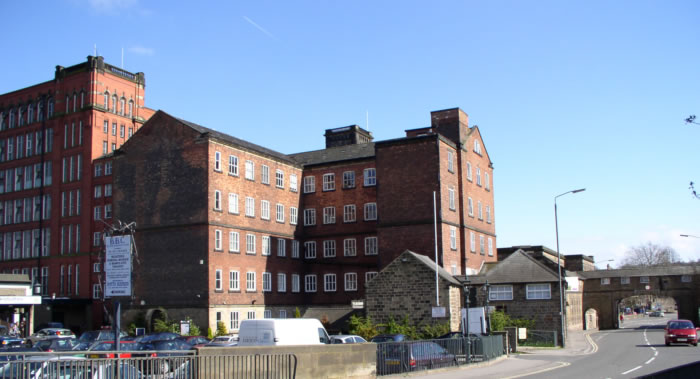
Belper North Mill

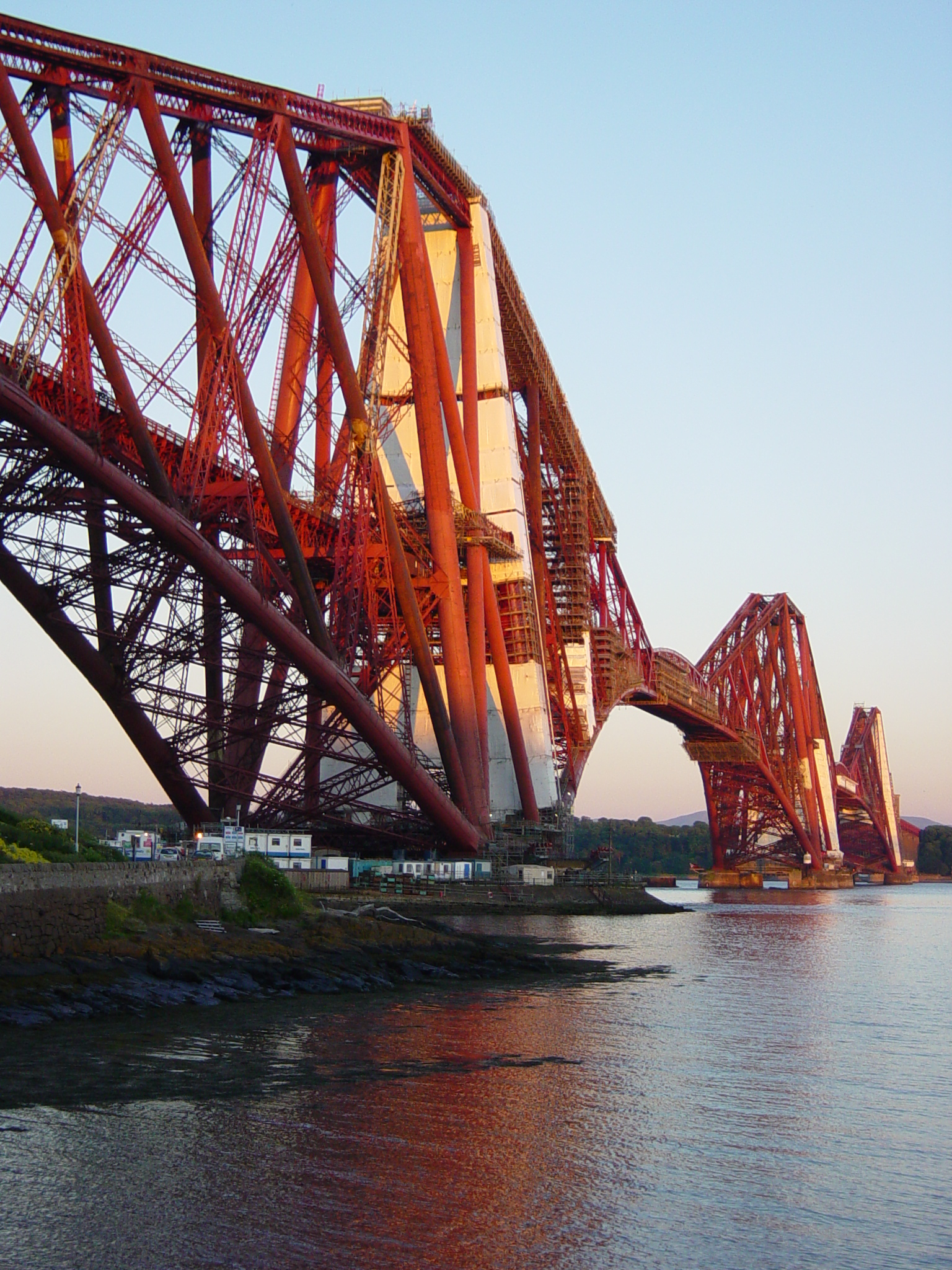
The Forth Bridge

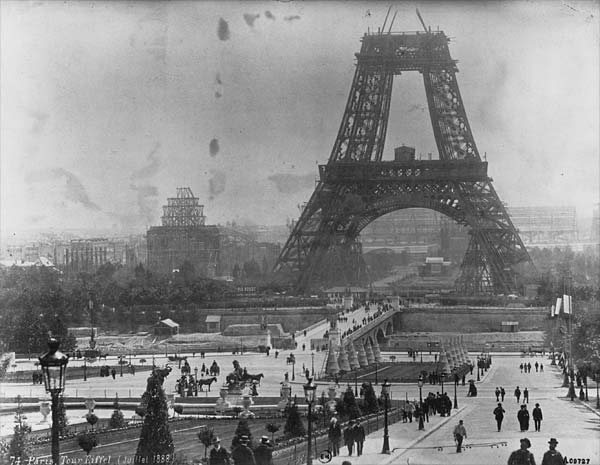
Eiffel Tower under construction in July 1888.

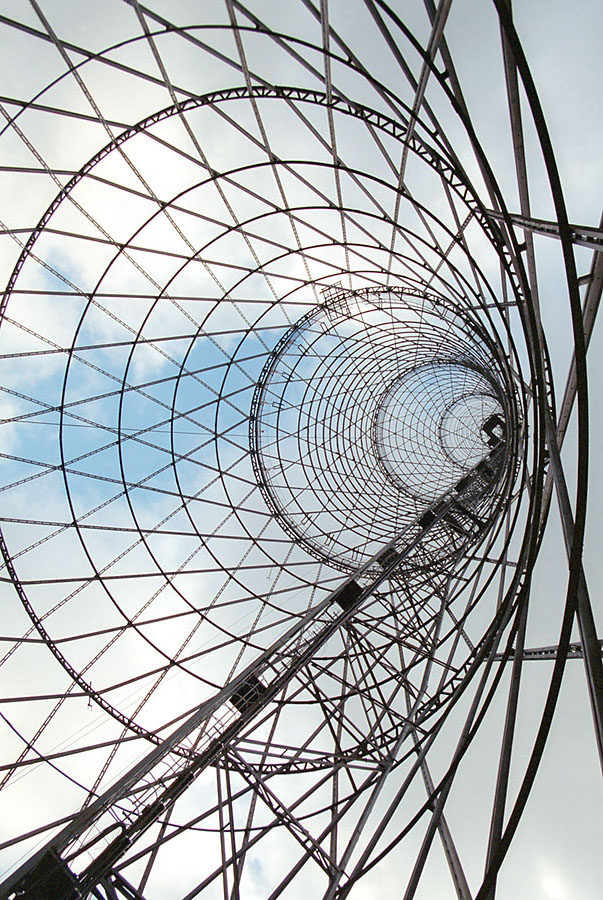
The Lattice shell structure of the Shukhov Tower in Moscow.

Throughout the late 19th and early 20th centuries, materials science and structural analysis underwent development at a tremendous pace.

Though elasticity was understood in theory well before the 19th century, it was not until 1821 that Claude-Louis Navier formulated the general theory of elasticity in a mathematically usable form. In his leçons of 1826 he explored a great range of different structural theory, and was the first to highlight that the role of a structural engineer is not to understand the final, failed state of a structure, but to prevent that failure in the first place. In 1826 he also established the elastic modulus as a property of materials independent of the second moment of area, allowing engineers for the first time to both understand structural behaviour and structural materials.

Towards the end of the 19th century, in 1873, Carlo Alberto Castigliano presented his dissertation "Intorno ai sistemi elastici", which contains his theorem for computing displacement as partial derivative of the strain energy.

In 1824, Portland cement was patented by the engineer Joseph Aspdin as "a superior cement resembling Portland Stone", British Patent no. 5022. Although different forms of cement already existed (Pozzolanic cement was used by the Romans as early as 100 B.C. and even earlier by the ancient Greek and Chinese civilizations) and were in common usage in Europe from the 1750s, the discovery made by Aspdin used commonly available, cheap materials, making concrete construction an economical possibility.

Developments in concrete continued with the construction in 1848 of a rowing boat built of ferrocement - the forerunner of modern reinforced concrete - by Joseph-Louis Lambot. He patented his system of mesh reinforcement and concrete in 1855, one year after W.B. Wilkinson also patented a similar system. This was followed in 1867 when a reinforced concrete planting tub was patented by Joseph Monier in Paris, using steel mesh reinforcement similar to that used by Lambot and Wilkinson. Monier took the idea forward, filing several patents for tubs, slabs and beams, leading eventually to the Monier system of reinforced structures, the first use of steel reinforcement bars located in areas of tension in the structure.

Steel construction was first made possible in the 1850s when Henry Bessemer developed the Bessemer process to produce steel. He gained patents for the process in 1855 and 1856 and successfully completed the conversion of cast iron into cast steel in 1858. Eventually mild steel would replace both wrought iron and cast iron as the preferred metal for construction.

During the late 19th century, great advancements were made in the use of cast iron, gradually replacing wrought iron as a material of choice. Ditherington Flax Mill in Shrewsbury, designed by Charles Bage, was the first building in the world with an interior iron frame. It was built in 1797. In 1792 William Strutt had attempted to build a fireproof mill at Belper in Derby (Belper West Mill), using cast iron columns and timber beams within the depths of brick arches that formed the floors. The exposed beam soffits were protected against fire by plaster. This mill at Belper was the world's first attempt to construct fireproof buildings, and is the first example of fire engineering. This was later improved upon with the construction of Belper North Mill, a collaboration between Strutt and Bage, which by using a full cast iron frame represented the world's first "fire proofed" building.

The Forth Bridge was built by Benjamin Baker, Sir John Fowler and William Arrol in 1889, using steel, after the original design for the bridge by Thomas Bouch was rejected following the collapse of his Tay Rail Bridge. The Forth Bridge was one of the first major uses of steel, and a landmark in bridge design. Also in 1889, the wrought-iron Eiffel Tower was built by Gustave Eiffel and Maurice Koechlin, demonstrating the potential of construction using iron, despite the fact that steel construction was already being used elsewhere.

During the late 19th century, Russian structural engineer Vladimir Shukhov developed analysis methods for tensile structures, thin-shell structures, lattice shell structures and new structural geometries such as hyperboloid structures. Pipeline transport was pioneered by Vladimir Shukhov and the Branobel company in the late 19th century.

Again taking reinforced concrete design forwards, from 1892 onwards François Hennebique's firm used his patented reinforced concrete system to build thousands of structures throughout Europe. Thaddeus Hyatt in the US and Wayss & Freitag in Germany also patented systems. The firm AG für Monierbauten constructed 200 reinforced concrete bridges in Germany between 1890 and 1897 The great pioneering uses of reinforced concrete however came during the first third of the 20th century, with Robert Maillart and others furthering of the understanding of its behaviour. Maillart noticed that many concrete bridge structures were significantly cracked, and as a result left the cracked areas out of his next bridge design - correctly believing that if the concrete was cracked, it was not contributing to the strength. This resulted in the revolutionary Salginatobel Bridge design. Wilhelm Ritter formulated the truss theory for the shear design of reinforced concrete beams in 1899, and Emil Mörsch improved this in 1902. He went on to demonstrate that treating concrete in compression as a linear-elastic material was a conservative approximation of its behaviour. Concrete design and analysis has been progressing ever since, with the development of analysis methods such as yield line theory, based on plastic analysis of concrete (as opposed to linear-elastic), and many different variations on the model for stress distributions in concrete in compression

Prestressed concrete, pioneered by Eugène Freyssinet with a patent in 1928, gave a novel approach in overcoming the weakness of concrete structures in tension. Freyssinet constructed an experimental prestressed arch in 1908 and later used the technology in a limited form in the Plougastel Bridge in France in 1930. He went on to build six prestressed concrete bridges across the Marne River, firmly establishing the technology.

Structural engineering theory was again advanced in 1930 when Professor Hardy Cross developed his Moment distribution method, allowing the real stresses of many complex structures to be approximated quickly and accurately.

In the mid 20th century John Fleetwood Baker went on to develop the plasticity theory of structures, providing a powerful tool for the safe design of steel structures. The possibility of creating structures with complex geometries, beyond analysis by hand calculation methods, first arose in 1941 when Alexander Hrennikoff submitted his D.Sc thesis at MIT on the topic of discretization of plane elasticity problems using a lattice framework. This was the forerunner to the development of finite element analysis. In 1942, Richard Courant developed a mathematical basis for finite element analysis. This led in 1956 to the publication by J. Turner, R. W. Clough, H. C. Martin, and L. J. Topp's of a paper on the "Stiffness and Deflection of Complex Structures". This paper introduced the name "finite-element method" and is widely recognised as the first comprehensive treatment of the method as it is known today.

High-rise construction, though possible from the late 19th century onwards, was greatly advanced during the second half of the 20th century. Fazlur Khan designed structural systems that remain fundamental to many modern high rise constructions and which he employed in his structural designs for the John Hancock Center in 1969 and Sears Tower in 1973. Khan's central innovation in skyscraper design and construction was the idea of the "tube" and "bundled tube" structural systems for tall buildings. He defined the framed tube structure as "a three dimensional space structure composed of three, four, or possibly more frames, braced frames, or shear walls, joined at or near their edges to form a vertical tube-like structural system capable of resisting lateral forces in any direction by cantilevering from the foundation." Closely spaced interconnected exterior columns form the tube. Horizontal loads, for example wind, are supported by the structure as a whole. About half the exterior surface is available for windows. Framed tubes allow fewer interior columns, and so create more usable floor space. Where larger openings like garage doors are required, the tube frame must be interrupted, with transfer girders used to maintain structural integrity. The first building to apply the tube-frame construction was in the DeWitt-Chestnut Apartment Building which Khan designed in Chicago. This laid the foundations for the tube structures used in most later skyscraper constructions, including the construction of the World Trade Center.

Another innovation that Fazlur Khan developed was the concept of X-bracing, which reduced the lateral load on the building by transferring the load into the exterior columns. This allowed for a reduced need for interior columns thus creating more floor space, and can be seen in the John Hancock Center. The first sky lobby was also designed by Khan for the John Hancock Center in 1969. Later buildings with sky lobbies include the World Trade Center, Petronas Twin Towers and Taipei 101.

In 1987 Jörg Schlaich and Kurt Schafer published the culmination of almost ten years of work on the strut and tie method for concrete analysis - a tool to design structures with discontinuities such as corners and joints, providing another powerful tool for the analysis of complex concrete geometries.

In the late 20th and early 21st centuries the development of powerful computers has allowed finite element analysis to become a significant tool for structural analysis and design. The development of finite element programs has led to the ability to accurately predict the stresses in complex structures, and allowed great advances in structural engineering design and architecture. In the 1960s and 70s computational analysis was used in a significant way for the first time on the design of the Sydney Opera House roof. Many modern structures could not be understood and designed without the use of computational analysis.

Developments in the understanding of materials and structural behaviour in the latter part of the 20th century have been significant, with detailed understanding being developed of topics such as fracture mechanics, earthquake engineering, composite materials, temperature effects on materials, dynamics and vibration control, fatigue, creep and others. The depth and breadth of knowledge now available in structural engineering, and the increasing range of different structures and the increasing complexity of those structures has led to increasing specialisation of structural engineers.

== See also ==
- Base isolation
- History of construction
- History of architecture
- History of sanitation and water supply
- Qanat water management system
