= Municipality of Juršinci =

Municipality of Slovenia

Municipality of Juršinci Občina Juršinci
- Municipality
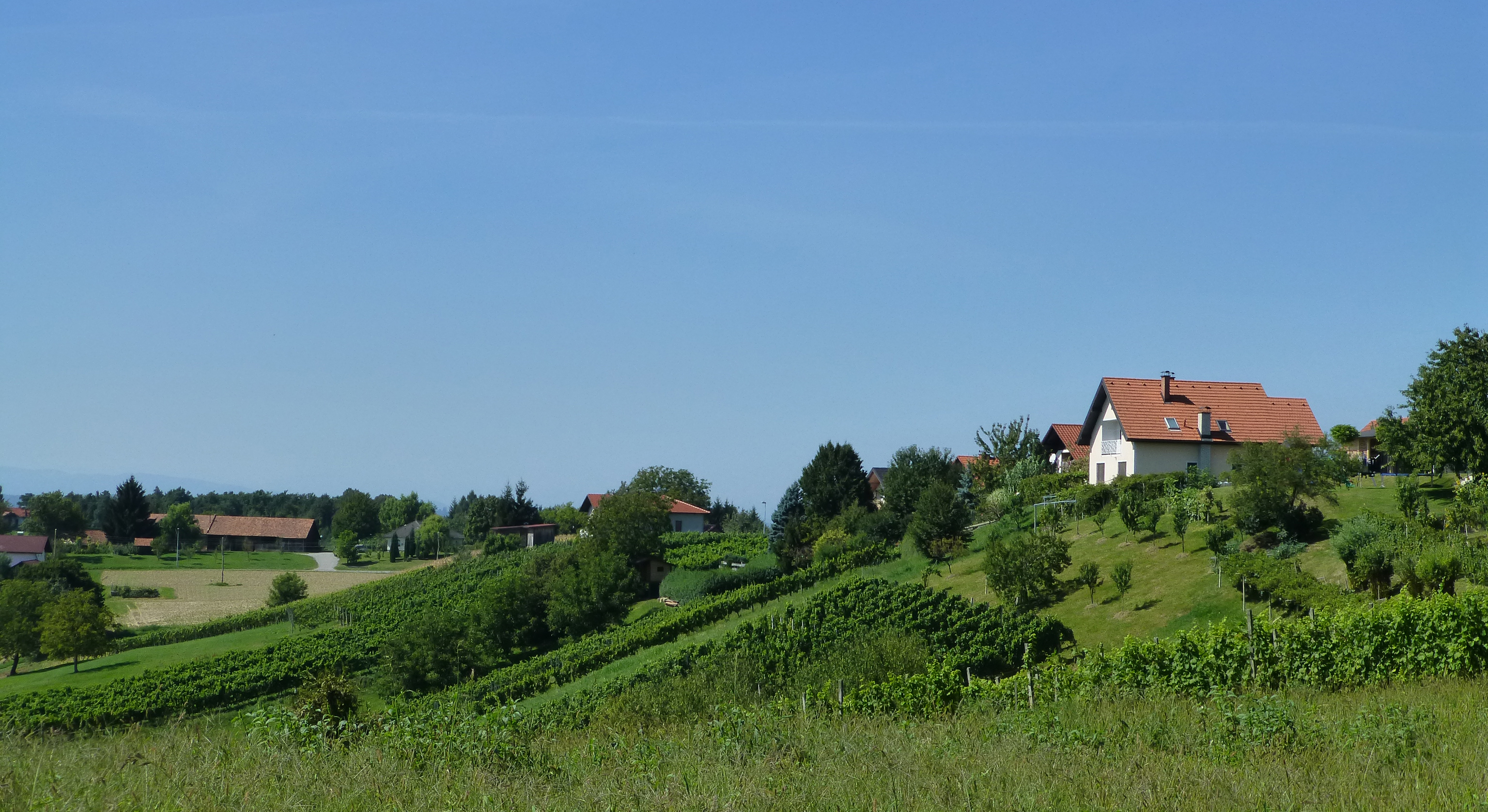

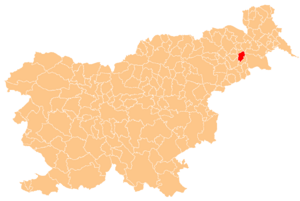
- Location of the Municipality of Juršinci in Slovenia
- Coordinates: 46°29′N 15°58′E
- Country: Slovenia

Government
  - Mayor: Alojz Kaučič (Independent)

Area
  - Total: 36.3 km^{2} (14.0 sq mi)

Population (2016)
  - Total: 2,361
  - Density: 65.0/km^{2} (168/sq mi)
- Time zone: UTC+01 (CET)
  - Summer (DST): UTC+02 (CEST)
- Website: www.jursinci.si

The Municipality of Juršinci (pronounced [ˈjuːɾʃintsi]; Slovene: Občina Juršinci) is a municipality in the traditional region of Styria in northeastern Slovenia. The seat of the municipality is the town of Juršinci. Juršinci became a municipality in 1994.

The municipality has a population of 2,361 (as of 2016). The majority are farmers. Agriculture in the area focuses mainly on viticulture and fruit production. Ludvik Toplak, a lawyer, university chancellor, ambassador, politician, and scholar, is an honorary resident of the Municipality of Juršinci.

== Settlements ==
In addition to the municipal seat of Juršinci, the municipality also includes the following settlements:

- Bodkovci
- Dragovič
- Gabrnik
- Gradiščak
- Grlinci
- Hlaponci
- Kukava
- Mostje
- Rotman
- Sakušak
- Senčak pri Juršincih
- Zagorci

== Notable people ==
Notable people that were born in the Municipality of Juršinci include:

- Johann Puch (1862–1914), Austrian craftsman and industrialist of Slovene origin, born in Sakušak
- Janža Toplak (1909–1973), farmers' cooperative and rural association organizer, one of the first Liberation Front agitators in the Ptuj area, born in Mostje
- Ludvik Toplak (born 1942), Slovenian lawyer, university rector, ambassador, politician and scholar, born in Mostje
- Jurij Toplak (born 1977), Slovenian legal scholar
