= Toplak =

Toplak is a Slovene and Serbo-Croatian surname. Notable people with the surname include:

- Ivan Toplak (1931–2021), Serbian footballer
- Jurij Toplak (born 1977), Slovene scholar
- Ludvik Toplak (born 1942), Slovene academic and politician
- Samir Toplak (born 1970), Croatian footballer
