= Geschwister-Scholl-Institut =

Research institute in Munich, Germany

Scholl Siblings Institute for Political Science
- Geschwister-Scholl-Institut für Politikwissenschaft – GSI –
- Type: Research Institute
- Established: 1958
- Affiliation: LMU Munich
- Dean: Prof. Dr. Klaus H. Goetz
- Location: Munich, Bavaria, Germany
- Website: www.gsi.uni-muenchen.de

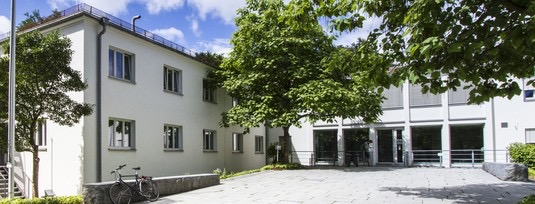
Geschwister-Scholl-Institut main entrance

The Geschwister-Scholl-Institut für Politikwissenschaft (English: Scholl Siblings Institute for Political Science, also known as the GSI) is a research institute at LMU Munich and a leading institution for research in political science in Europe. It is named after Hans and Sophie Scholl, members of the White Rose, a student group in Munich that was active in the non-violent resistance movement in Nazi Germany. In post-war Germany, Hans and Sophie Scholl are recognized as symbols of the German resistance to Nazism.

By naming the GSI after the Scholl siblings, the GSI commits itself to the world view of freedom, democracy and tolerance, and to a teaching that conveys these values to the students and encourages them to be critical.

As one of the largest institutions dedicated to political science in Germany, the GSI holds extraordinary influence in the practical politics of Germany, along with its affiliated think tank, the Centrum für angewandte Politikforschung. The founding director of the GSI was the German-American philosopher Eric Voegelin.

== History ==
The history of political science at LMU Munich began long before the founding of the GSI. Political science was, back then, divided between historical studies and jurisprudence. To promote the methodological possibilities of historical science to study politics, King Maximilian I Joseph of Bavaria invited several prominent historians to Munich; among them were Joseph Görres, Leopold von Ranke, Carl Adolph Cornelius, Heinrich von Sybel, and Wilhelm Heinrich Riehl. The jurisprudence faculty at LMU Munich dealt with diverse political thoughts, their interaction with constitutions and political behavior arising from them.

A further dimension of political science at LMU Munich is shown in particular by the work of economists like Lujo Brentano and Max Weber, who also contributed to major developments in political science at LMU Munich. Historians affiliated with LMU Munich, such as Hermann Oncken, studied political consequences of the course of history, which refined the profile of political science in Munich.

During the Nazi Era, sociology and political science were disintegrated, because the analytical potential of these sciences threatened to harm the Völkisch movement as the intellectual and spiritual foundation of the new Reich. Therefore numerous social scientists were driven into exile, from which only a small part would return to Germany after the Second World War.

The Munich School of Political Science, the normatively oriented school of political science at LMU Munich after the Second World War, was shaped by the emigrant philosopher Eric Voegelin. He had survived the Third Reich in the United States and was, from both the point of view of the US, and in the public opinion of the post-war period in Germany, most suitable to start the process of re-education and denazification, and to promote political science (that was now widely understood as a science of democracy). Thanks to his international connections and reputation, Voegelin managed to organize German and American donations for the establishment of the institute (which was initially housed in Theresienstrasse 3-5) and to attract significant foreign guest lecturers.

In 1996 the Geschwister-Scholl-Institut moved to its final location in the former Radio Free Europe building at the Englischer Garten.

== Degree programs ==
The Geschwister-Scholl-Institut educates undergraduate and graduate students in political science. The GSI offers one BA program, one MA program, and two dual-degree programs.

=== Bachelor of Arts ===
The GSI offers a six-semester Bachelor of Arts (B.A.) program in which, on the one hand, the disciplinary core of political science is introduced, and on the other hand, students are flexibel in setting individual priorities in the various political science disciplines. The BA program is research-oriented. Special attention is paid to the training of methods (quantitative methods only), which allows students to relate theory and empirical reality to each other. In addition, a minor must be chosen. Available minors are amongst others sociology, communication science, economics, history, law or philosophy.

=== Master of Arts ===
At the GSI one can obtain a Master of Arts degree by studying for four semesters. The program is essentially disciplinary and is studied without a minor subject. A one-semester foundation course provides an overview of the three main areas of the Master's programme: Theory and Empirics of Democratic Politics, International and European Politics and Governance and Public Policy. Students decide on the further study profile according to their own interests.

In addition, together with two partner universities, two double degree options are offered as part of the master's programme:

- Double Master Degree with Pompeu Fabra University in Barcelona
- Double Master Degree with Stockholm University in Stockholm

Internationally, the GSI maintains various contacts with renowned partner institutions, such as the Institut d'Etudes Politiques de Paris (Sciences Po), he Hebrew University of Jerusalem, and the University of British Columbia; students may benefit from these connections in the context of an exchange year. In addition, internationally renowned political scientists are regularly invited to Munich as visiting professors.

== Voegelin-Centre for Politics, Culture and Religion ==
The Voegelin-Zentrum für Politik, Kultur und Religion (Voegelin-Centre for Politics, Culture and Religion), which is affiliated to the GSI, sees its central task as enabling and expanding a scientific discussion of the subject area of politics, culture and religion. The center emerged from the Eric Voegelin Archive founded by Peter J. Opitz in 1990, and pursues nowadays two thematic priorities. On the one hand an intensive research of the philosophical work of Eric Voegelin. Previously unpublished writings by Eric Voegelin have been translated and edited and new contributions to Voegelin research have been published in the Voegeliniana series. On the other hand, the Centre pursues an intensified examination of the subject area of politics, culture and religion. This topic has gained enormously in importance and attention in recent years, in particular in the context of the debates on a "return of religion" or with regard to new forms of religious fundamentalism. The Center addresses the relationship between politics and religion from a primarily political-theoretical perspective, and is expressly committed to an interdisciplinary approach.

== Munich Center on Governance, Communication, Public Policy and Law ==
The Munich Center on Governance, Communication, Public Policy and Law (MCG), in which the GSI participates, has been established at the Faculty of Social Sciences at LMU. The MCG is an interdisciplinary research center and part of the LMUinnovativ concept. The basic aim of the MCG is to contribute with its research to a better understanding of the various governance arrangements. The MCG is an interdisciplinary institution of the LMU Munich, in which the topic "Governance in Modern Societies" is jointly researched by political scientists, legal scholars, economists and communication scientists.

== Centrum für angewandte Politikforschung (CAP) ==
The Centrum für angewandte Politikforschung (Center for Applied Policy Research, or CAP) was founded in 1995 by Werner Weidenfeld with the aim of providing long-term strategy consulting and scientifically based orientation for politics, business and civil society. As an independent think tank, the CAP tries to close the gap between politics and science with its special working approach of applied policy research. The CAP is one of the largest university institutes for political consulting on European and international issues in Germany.

== Notable faculty ==
- Arnold Bergstraesser, One of the founders of political science in Germany after World War II
- Karsten Fischer, German political scientist
- Friedrich Kratochwil, Professor of International Relations and pioneer of Constructivism
- Julian Nida-Rümelin, German philosopher and State Minister for Culture of the Federal Republic of Germany
- Eric Voegelin, German-American political philosopher
- Werner Weidenfeld, German political scientist and political advisor for Germany–United States relations

== Notable alumni ==
- Ulrich Beck, Sociologist and one of the most cited social scientists
- Karl Carstens, President of the Federal Republic of Germany from 1979 to 1984
- Giovanni di Lorenzo, Journalist and Editor-in-chief of German nationwide newspaper Die Zeit
- Kurt Faltlhauser, German politician (CSU) and former Minister of Finance in Bavaria
- Günther Jauch, Television host
- Bruno Jonas, Kabarett artist
- Ulrich Kienzle, Journalist, publisher and ARD correspondent for the Near East
- Manuel Knoll, Professor of Political Philosophy
- Michael Mittermeier, Comedian
- Walter Momper, politician (SPD), former mayor of Berlin and President of the Bundesrat
- Michael Naumann, politician (SPD), publisher, journalist and director of the Barenboim-Said Academy in Berlin
- Gerhard Polt, writer, filmmaker, actor and satirical cabaret artist
- Ludwig Stiegler, former chairman of the SPD's group in the Bundestag and chairman of the SPD Bavaria
- Bernhard Vogel, politician (CDU), former Minister President of Rhineland-Palatinate and of Thuringia and former president of the Bundesrat
- Tita von Hardenberg, Television journalist, presenter and producer
