= Luka Martin Tomažič =

Slovenian legal scholar, author and intellectual

- Born: Luka Martin Tomažič; 1988 (age 37–38); Maribor, SR Slovenia, SFR Yugoslavia
- Education: University of Maribor, University of London, New New University
- Occupations: Scholar, lawyer, author
- Employer: Alma Mater Europaea University

Luka Martin Tomažič (born 1988) is a Slovenian legal scholar, author and intellectual. He has been formally educated in law, international relations, local history, economics and business. He has published scholarly articles and books, especially in energy law and legal philosophy.

He clerked for Ernest Petrič, the former president and member of the United Nations International Law Commission and was a visiting professor at the University of Zagreb. He is a researcher at Alma Mater Europaea and a member of Rotary Club Maribor.

He has been involved in public discussions in Slovenia and has signed open letters on the topics of rule of law, constitutional court conduct and the educational system. In 2023, he was named by IusInfo as one of the ten most influential Slovenian lawyers. Tomažič has published poetry in several Slovenian literary journals.

== Education ==
Luka Martin Tomažič studied law and completed a master's in economics and business at the University of Maribor. He received a Master of Laws degree from University of London and a PhD in law from New University. Additionally, he holds an advanced diploma in local history from University of Oxford and a graduate diploma in international relations from University of London with London School of Economics and Political Science as the lead college.

== Career ==
He started his career as an in-house lawyer and later general counsel for Elektro Maribor Energija plus (now part of HSE Group). He was a research assistant to the member and former president of International Law Commission and Slovenian constitutional court judge professor Ernest Petrič, and was among the thirty young international lawyers selected as participants at the 51st session of the International Law Seminar at the United Nations Office in Geneva. In 2020, he was appointed by the Constitutional Commission of the Slovenian Parliament to the expert group for assessment of simplification of the appointment of government. He later transitioned to academia as a researcher and assistant professor at Alma Mater Europaea university. He has published more than a hundred works, including three scientific monographs, eighteen scientific articles and has acted as a reviewer for international scientific journals, including Environmental Science and Pollution Research, Sustainability and Lex Localis. He was a visiting professor at the University of Zagreb, Faculty of Law, where he also lectured at the Zagreb Legal Theory Group. In 2023, the IusInfo portal deemed him one of the ten most influential Slovenian lawyers.

He has been the vice president of the organisational board and a member of the scientific and programme committee of the annual It's About People conference, organised by the European Academy of Sciences and Arts and Alma Mater Europaea - ECM. These events featured the European Commission vice-presidents and commissioners Maroš Šefčovič, Mariya Gabriel and Dubravka Šuica, economist Jeffrey Sachs, Oxford Faculty of Law dean Mindy Chen-Wishart, Baroness Ruth Deech, Facebook oversight board member András Sajó, Klaus Mainzer, and Felix Unger of EASA, as well as presidents of the Republic of Slovenia Borut Pahor and Nataša Pirc Musar.

== Political views and humanitarian work ==
He co-signed several open letters in the Slovenian public sphere, including the public statement with Boris Pahor on Slovenian culture and European values in schools. He is a member of Rotary club Maribor.

== Poetry ==
His poems were published in the journals Mentor, Idiot, Novi zvon and Mladika. He was shortlisted at the Festival of young literature Urška 2013.

== Selected works ==
=== Books ===
Tomažič, Luka Martin. Vladavina prava v slovenskem ustavnem redu. 1. ed. Maribor: AMEU – Evropski Center Maribor, Alma Mater Press, 2023. ISBN 978-961-7183-24-5

Tomažič, Luka Martin. Argumentiranje poslovnih odločitev. 1. ed. Maribor: Založba WD, 2021. 255 pp. ISBN 978-961-94599-4-2

Tomažič, Luka Martin. Dialektična metoda: pristop k reševanju kompleksnih pravnih primerov. 1. ed. Maribor: Alma Mater Europaea, 2020. 113 pp. ISBN 978-961-6966-63-4

Bratina, Borut (editor), Šepec, Miha (editor), Tomažič, Luka Martin (editor), Stajnko, Jan (editor). Sodobne dileme prekrškovnega prava energetike. 1. ed. Maribor: Univerzitetna založba, 2020. 324 pp. ISBN 978-961-286-336-4

=== Articles ===
Zakari, Abdulrasheed, Toplak, Jurij, Tomažič, Luka Martin. Exploring the relationship between energy and food security in Africa with instrumental variables analysis. Energies. 2022, vol. 15, no. 15, pp. 1–14. ISSN 1996-1073. https://www.mdpi.com/1996-1073/15/15/5473, doi:10.3390/en15155473

Stajnko, Jan, Kičin, Sedin, Tomažič, Luka Martin. Kriminalitetnopolitično razumevanje 297. člena KZ-1: sovražni govor in dva koncepta svobode. Revija za kriminalistiko in kriminologijo. jan.-mar. 2020, vol. 71, no. 1, pp. 31–41. ISSN 0034-690X. https://www.policija.si/images/stories/Publikacije/RKK/PDF/2020/01/RKK2020-01_JanStanjko_KZ_SovrazniGovor.pdf.

Toplak Perović, Barbara, Tomažič, Luka Martin. Legal liability of municipal corporations: a rational choice approach to optimising deterrence. Lex localis: revija za lokalno samoupravo. [Tiskana izd.]. Apr. 2021, vol. 19, no. 2, pp. 415–437, tabela. ISSN 1581-5374 doi:10.4335/19.2.415-437(2021)

Tomažič, Luka Martin. A Finnis-based understanding of the rule of law and the dialectical method of Aquinas = Razumevanje vladavine prava in dialektična metoda Akvinskega na osnovi Finnisa. Bogoslovni vestnik: glasilo Teološke fakultete v Ljubljani. [Tiskana izd.]. 2019, vol. 79, no. 1, pp. 47–57. ISSN 0006-5722. https://www.teof.uni-lj.si/zaloznistvo/bogoslovni-vestnik/bogoslovni-vestnik-79-2019-1, http://www.dlib.si/details/URN:NBN:SI:doc-OY8MP3CL, doi:10.34291/BV2019/01/Tomazic

Tomažič, Luka Martin. Local-level nudging for renewables in Slovenia: organisational aspects and legal limitations. Lex localis: revija za lokalno samoupravo. [Tiskana izd.]. Jul. 2020, vol. 18, no. 3, pp. 537–556. ISSN 1581-5374. doi:10.4335/18.3.523-556(2020)

Tomažič, Luka Martin, Lukač, Niko, Štumberger, Gorazd. A new regulatory approach for PV-based self-supply, validated by a techno-economic assessment: a case study for Slovenia. Sustainability. 26 Jan. 2021, vol. 13, iss. 3, pp 1–14. ISSN 2071-1050. doi:10.3390/su13031290

Toplak Perović, Barbara, Tomažič, Luka Martin. Cross-border access to healthcare in the EU: a genealogical analysis of regulatory aspects. Journal of comparative politics. [Online ed.]. 2023, vol. 16, no. 2, pp. 38–50. ISSN 1338-1385. http://www.jofcp.org/assets/jcp/Articles-2-2023/JCP-July23-3.pdf.

=== Poetry ===
Tomažič, Luka Martin. Psevdografi. Mladika. 2020, vol. 64, [no.] 7/8, p. 31. ISSN 1124-657X.

Tomažič, Luka Martin. Cikel evropski eksepcionalizem. Mentor: mesečnik za vprašanja literature in mentorstva. May 2018, vol. 39, no. 2, pp. 7–10, 16. ISSN 0351-367X.

Tomažič, Luka Martin. Točka; Vrbnik; Namizno vino; Potepuhi; Sedmina v puščavi; Ples in ločitev. Novi zvon. feb. 2017/mar. 2018 [i. e. feb. 2018/mar. 2018], vol. 7, no. 1, pp. 24–29. ISSN 2385-9687.
