= Jurij Toplak =

Slovenian jurist

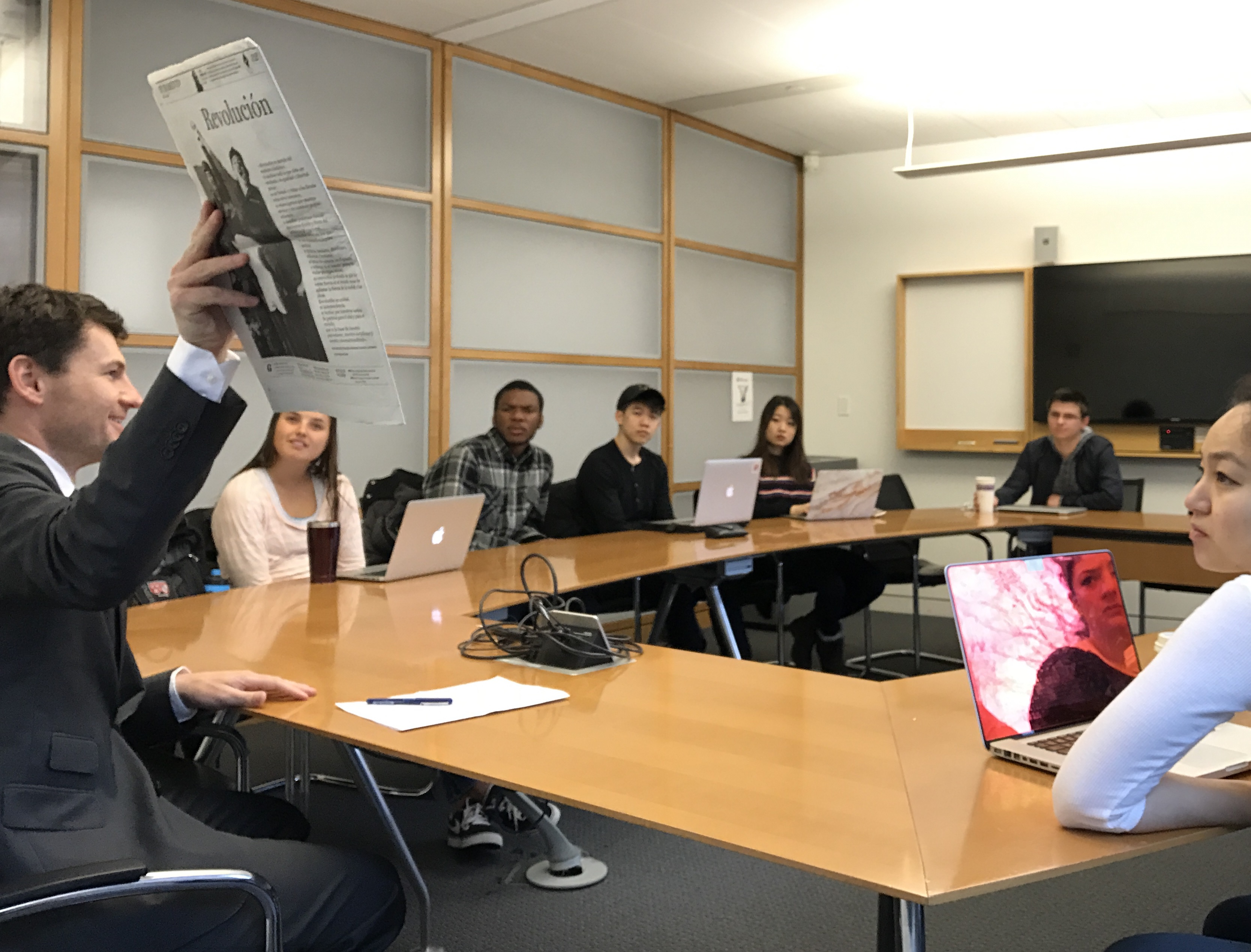
Jurij Toplak and Harvard University students in 2017 discussing the Cuban revolution

Jurij Toplak (born 1977) is a constitutional scholar, university administrator, election law, and human rights expert. He is professor at University of Maribor and a recurring visiting professor at the Fordham University School of Law in New York. Since 2016, he has served as the provost and vice-president of the Alma Mater Europaea university. The Washington Post, The Guardian, The Wall Street Journal, Financial Times, The New York Times, and The Boston Globe published his legal comments. Toplak is a member of the European Academy of Sciences and Arts and serves as the co-chair of the International Association of Constitutional Law (IACL) Freedom of Expression research group.

== Education ==
Toplak received an LL.M. degree at Central European University in Budapest under the mentorship of Michel Rosenfeld and Andras Sajó. He served as a Fulbright Scholar at the UCLA Law School in 2003–2004, and his doctoral dissertation supervisor was Daniel H. Lowenstein.

== Professional career ==
He was a member of the National Election Commission of Slovenia from 2000 until 2012. Since 2006, he has been a board member, and he is a vice-chair of International Political Science Association Political Finance and Political Corruption Research Committee. At the age of 23 he published his first book on redistricting, for which Slovenian Lawyers’ Association awarded him with a “Young Lawyer of the Year” award. In 2006 he published (together with Klemen Jaklic, then a lecturer at Harvard), the first translation of United States Constitution into Slovene. Together with Daniel Smilov, he co-edited a book Political Finance and Political Corruption in Eastern Europe (Ashgate, 2008). In 2011, he led a research on disability discrimination, which evaluated responsiveness of over 200 municipalities to freedom of information requests submitted by blind persons. He classified preferential voting electoral systems. Pippa Norris and Bernard Grofman are among those who referred to his works, and he is among the top ten most cited Slovenian legal scholars. He was a member of the Ombudsman's Human Rights Council and of the government's Commission for Equal Chances in Science.

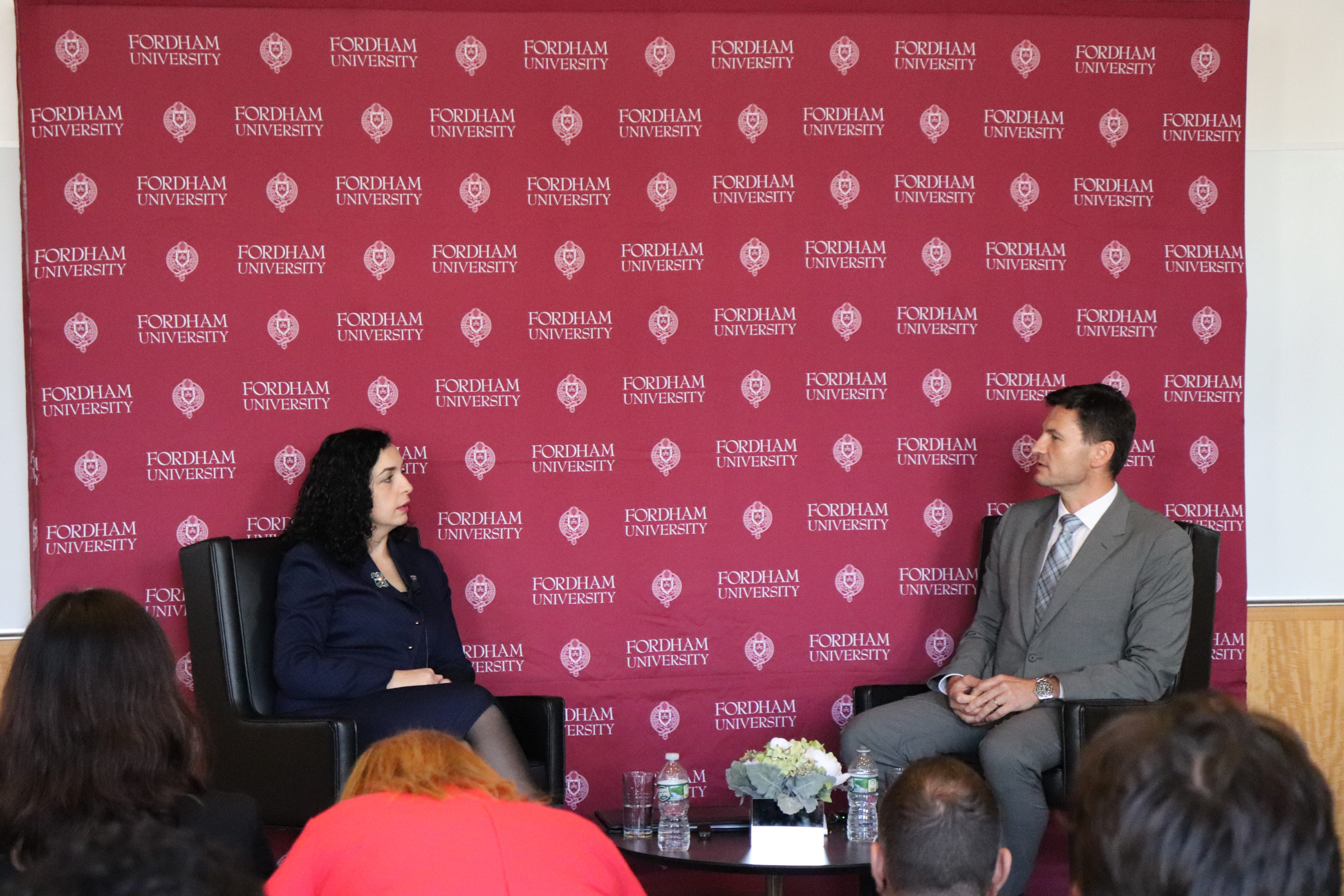
Toplak and Kosovo President Vjosa Osmani in New York in 2022.

As a consultant to governments or international organisations OSCE, European Union, Council of Europe, Greco, and UNDP he worked in Uganda, Canada, United States, France, Finland, Latvia, Monaco, Serbia, Montenegro, Malta, Ukraine, Romania and elsewhere.

In 2022, with David Schultz, Toplak co-edited the Routledge Handbook of Election Law. He is considered "one of the world's leading election law experts."

== Notable cases ==
Jure Toplak led numerous successful impact litigation projects and wrote complaints and appeals to Slovenian Supreme Court and Constitutional Court, which improved human rights protection of disabled persons, candidates and voters. He is known to side with the underdog and defend victims and weaker parties in disputes, and is the most successful author of human rights appeals in Slovenia.

Based on the constitutional appeal he wrote for a group of paraplegics, the Constitutional Court ruled in 2010 that “as many as possible” polling stations need to be wheelchair accessible. Next year he wrote another appeal for three wheelchair users, and in 2014 the Constitutional Court annulled part of the election law and ruled that all polling stations must be accessible for persons with disabilities.

In 2015, when the Constitutional Court was deciding whether the parliamentary seat of a parliamentarian due to his conviction was constitutional or not, the court copied arguments from Toplak's Amicus Curiae brief. During the 2018 parliamentary election, he helped a Green Party candidate list rejected by the election commissions and the Supreme Court returned it on the ballot.

When the Constitutional Court invalidated election districts legislation in 2018, Toplak is mentioned or cited 17 times in the court's decision and judges' opinions. In 2019, the Constitutional Court invalidated the local music quota law based on the appeal written by Toplak.

In 2017, Jurij Toplak wrote a challenge to the referendum results for a voter and activist Vili Kovačič, which led to the first-ever public hearing by the Supreme Court of Slovenia and first-ever annulment of referendum results on 14 March 2018. On the same day Prime Minister Miro Cerar resigned. A minute later, a leading television program Pop TV, which broadcast the resignation, referred to Jurij Toplak as “the silent winner of the court ruling.”

== Lawyer of the Year Award ==
In 2022 the Slovenian Lawyers’ Association, which unites 29 legal associations, named him “The Lawyer of the Year.” Slovenian lawyers voted Jurij Toplak among 'Ten most influential lawyers in Slovenia' in 2018, 2019, 2020, and 2021.

In October 2021, the European Court of Human Rights issued its judgment Toplak and Mrak against Slovenia. The case concerned accessibility of polling places and voting. Jurij Toplak wrote the appeal for Franc Toplak, his uncle, and other voters with disabilities, and the Court ruled that Slovenia had violated his uncle's and other applicants' human rights. Toplak wrote a class action for the Slovenian Disability Rights Association, which asked for a review and reform of the polling places accessibility, and for a 54 million Euros of compensation for the past discrimination of persons with disabilities.

Toplak is a staunch defender of free speech and transparent government. In 2014, after two years of litigation for access to information, he obtained statistical data on schools and published it, which triggered a heated public debate.

Toplak had long publicly opposed punishing of Internet users who discussed election candidates during the electoral silence. In 2011, he wrote two successful appeals for such Facebook users. After the 2014 elections, he wrote an appeal to the Supreme Court for a voter, who was fined 100 euros for publishing a comment on Facebook on a day before elections. In September 2016, the Supreme Court dismissed the fine and ruled that comments and discussions are not within a definition of illegal propaganda.

In March 2021, Toplak disclosed in the Daily Express that the European Court of Human Rights had stopped sharing its files with the public. “After allowing access to its single-judge decisions for decades and after sending applications out for several months, the Court’s termination of access in March 2021 due to the pandemic seems unjustified. The pandemic has not worsened in March 2021," he said. Just few hours after the Daily Express published the article, the Court changed its practice and sent documents to those who requested them.

Toplak wrote an appeal for an activist Vili Kovačič who was convicted for calling the judge “a pig” in the courtroom after the judge convicted Milko Novič to 25 years for murder. In a re-trial, Novič was found not guilty, and based on the appeal written by Toplak, the Supreme Court in 2022 dropped the fine imposed on Kovačič. They argued that freedom of expression protects those who call “a pig” an unfair and abusive judge who wrongly convicts a person of murder without evidence, and claimed that “pig” is a common description of abusive rulers, including in George Orwell’s Animal Farm.

In 2022, he in three hours solved a math problem previously believed to take weeks to solve. Soon after the 2022 national elections, the National Election Commission of Slovenia published names of the elected parliament members. Two weeks later, it announced that six seats have been wrongly assigned due to a "computer defect." The National Election Commission's president explained that it was impossible to calculate all 88 seats correctly, because a manual calculation would take "months of work for hundreds of people." The next day, Toplak on YouTube published a video in which he with a simple calculator and a pen calculated all 88 seats correctly in less than three hours.

== European Academy of Sciences and Arts ==
Together with the European Academy of Sciences and Arts, Toplak and his father Ludvik Toplak developed the international Alma Mater Europaea university. Jurij Toplak served as the Dean of Business Studies between 2012 and 2016. He served as the university's provost between 2016 and 2022, and currently is the university’s vice president.

In 2020, Toplak organized and moderated the first round-the-globe and round-the-clock online conference, which soon became common during the COVID-19 pandemic. The event featured 52 of the world's leading constitutional law scholars including Mark Tushnet of Harvard Law School, Oxford professor Jacob Rowbottom, Adrienne Stone, Janny Leung, Pierre de Vos, Richard Calland, Michael Pinto-Duschinsky, RonNell Andersen Jones and the ECHR judges András Sajó and Boštjan M Zupančič.

In 2021, he took over the chairmanship of the organization of the It's About People conference. Since then, the event featured speakers economist Jeffrey Sachs, the European Commission vice-presidents and commissioners Maroš Šefčovič, Mariya Gabriel and Dubravka Šuica, Oxford Law School dean Mindy Chen-Wishart, Baroness Ruth Deech, András Sajó, Dimitry Kochenov, Klaus Mainzer, and Felix Unger.

== Personal life ==
His father is a law professor, diplomat, and university rector Ludvik Toplak, who served as the president of the Slovenian parliament's chamber during Slovenia's independence, democratisation and constitution-making. His mother is attorney Rosvita Toplak. Jurij's paternal grandfather was a grapevine producer, agricultural cooperatives' organizer Janža Toplak, who in June 1941 hosted the first anti-Nazi resistance meeting in the Ptuj region, and shortly after that Gestapo arrested, tortured, and then killed his brother Franc Toplak, a university student of agriculture. The Toplak family in Mostje near Juršinci dates back to 1610. Jurij's maternal grandfather was Edvard Sitar, an inventor, a founder and administrator of several schools, a songwriter, and a partizan poet, tortured and imprisoned by Italian fascists.
