= Alma Mater Europaea University =

Non-profit research and higher education institution in Slovenia

Coordinates: 46°33′N 15°39′E

- Former name: Alma Mater Europaea (ECM)
- Type: Research University
- Established: 2007; 19 years ago
- Founder: Evropska administrativna akademija (European Administrative Academy)
- Rector: Ludvik Toplak
- Location: Maribor, Ljubljana, Vienna,, Slovenia, Austria
- Website: www.almamater.si www.almamater.at

Alma Mater Europaea graduation ceremony. Maribor, Slovenia, 12 March 2013

Alma Mater Europaea University (previously Alma Mater Europaea ECM) is an accredited non-profit research university in Slovenia with campuses in Austria and Slovenia. It is part of an international university network Alma Mater Europaea of the European Academy of Sciences and Arts, which unites about 2000 leading scholars, 38 of which are Nobel Prize laureates. Alma Mater Europaea University offers 25 doctoral, masters, and bachelor degree studies in Humanities, Social Gerontology, Ecology, Business, Web and Information technologies, Applied Artificial Intelligence, Sustainable Development, European studies, Project Management as well as Social Studies, Healthcare, Nursing, and Physical therapy. Institutum Studiorum Humanitatis, the oldest Slovenian private higher education institution, joined Alma Mater in 2014. Since 2015, a Dance Academy, the only Slovenian accredited institution offering diplomas ballet and dance studies, is part of the Alma Mater.

Among the leading scholars, who teach or have given guest lectures at Alma Mater or its events, are Harvard Law School professor Mark Tushnet, Oxford professors Martin Kemp, Mindy Chen-Wishart, Jacob Rowbottom and Jeremy Howick, Yale professor Fred Volkmer German political scientist Werner Weidenfeld, who was the rector of Alma Mater, the Alma Mater president and cardiac surgeon Felix Unger, the Facebook and Instagram Oversight Board member and former European Court of Human Rights vice-president Andras Sajo, David Erdos of Cambridge, and philosophers Alain Badiou, Jean-Luc Nancy, and Srećko Horvat. Alma Mater faculty has participated at the leading universities' events including those of Harvard, Columbia, UCLA, and Yale. Their expert opinion appeared in leading media such as The Guardian, New York Times, Wall Street Journal, Washington Post, and Financial Times.

Felix Unger, the then-president of the European Academy of Sciences and Arts, proposed the transnational European university with the Academy's members serving as faculty, and coined the name Alma Mater Europaea. Ludvik Toplak has developed the Alma Mater Europaea ECM, and later Alma Mater Europaea University, and has served as its president and rector since its inception. Between 2016 and 2022, Jurij Toplak served as the provost/executive vice president.

== History ==
=== Origins and early years ===
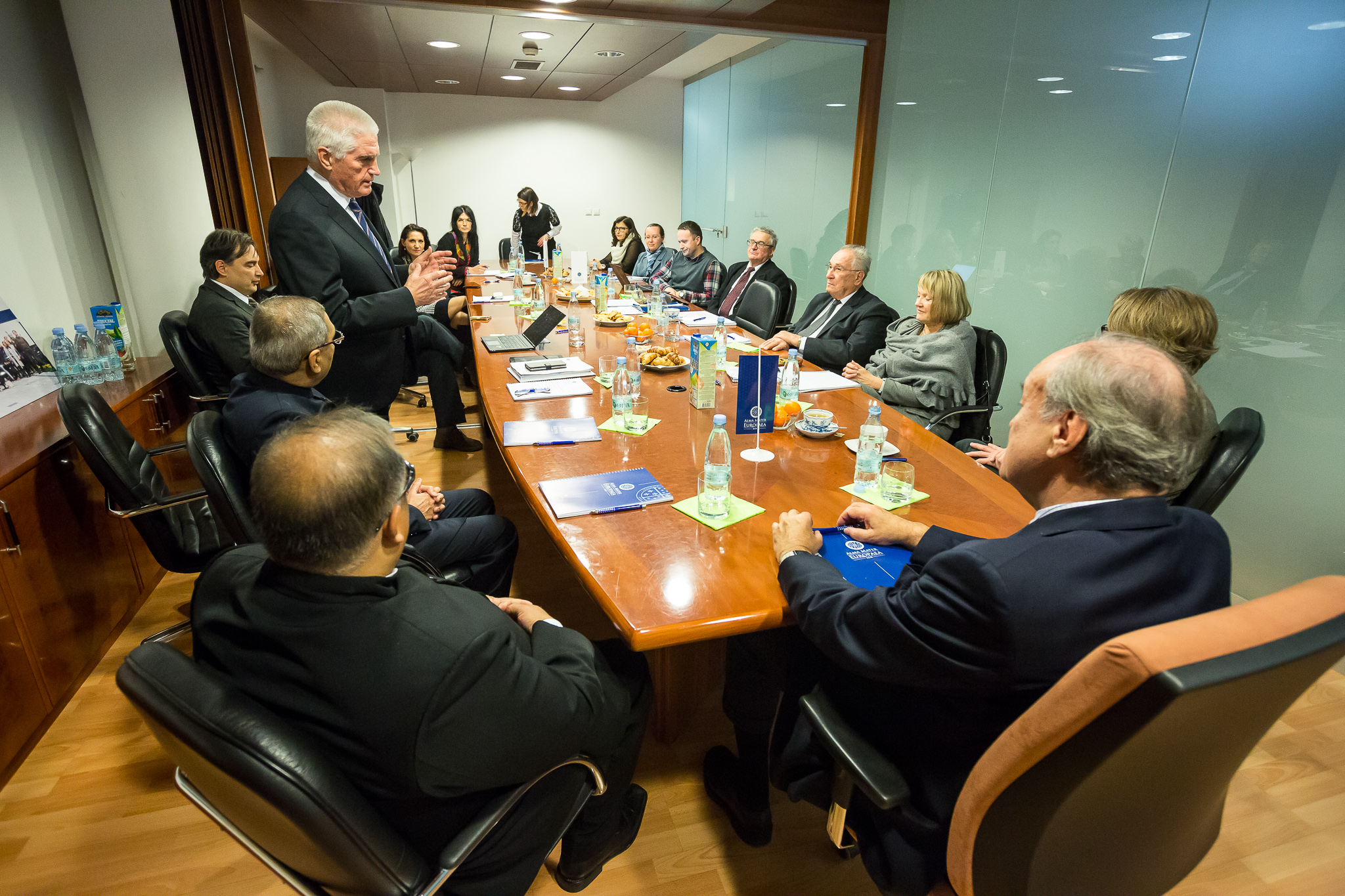
Alma Mater Europaea University Senate meeting

In 2007 European Academy of Sciences and Arts Salzburg (EASA) established Alma Mater Europaea as an academic institution that provides an organizational frame and contents for cultural and professional renewal of the Danube region. AMEU - ECM is part of Alma Mater Europaea as an academic and research institution, a network of over 250 academic teachers and over 40 academic institutions from 12 countries in the Danube region, also connecting 1400 excellent researchers, several Nobel prize recipients.

In 2011, EASA gave an institutional patronage to the European Centre Maribor, including it into the newly established university network Alma Mater Europaea, established particularly for the Danube region. A new project was placed in hands of AMEU - ECM under this patronage; namely organization of the Regional Interactive Educational Network (RIEN).

Until 2024, it operated under the name was Alma Mater Europaea, European Centre Maribor (ECM). In 2011 students started studying management and social gerontology. Alma Mater Europaea started offering environmental studies and European studies in 2012 and archival science in 2013.

In March 2013 the first group of 50 students graduated. The president of the European Academy of Sciences and Arts prof. ddr. Felix Unger gave the opening speech. On the same day an Alumni club was established.

In March 2024, it obtained a university accreditation by the Slovenian Higher Education Agency (Nakvis) and it became the seventh university in Slovenia. It changed the name to Alma Mater Europaea University.

== Campuses ==
=== Locations in Slovenia ===
Alma Mater Europaea operates in locations in Austria and Slovenia. The main office and academic facilities are located in Maribor. The academic programmes also take place in Ljubljana, Murska Sobota and Celje.
Some of the academic programmes mostly enroll students from Croatia, Bosnia and Serbia. The lectures, seminars and exams take place in Zagreb, Croatia.
AMEU also has its affiliates in Salzburg, Austria.

=== Location in Vienna, Austria ===
In 2024, Alma Mater opened its campus in Austria. Under the name Alma Mater Europaea, campus Vienna, shorter Alma Mater Vienna, it started Bachelor studies in Physiotherapy and Doctor of Science program in Applied Artificial Intelligence. It announced campuses in Klagenfurt and Salzburg and additional bachelor, masters and doctoral degree programs. Dr. Maximilian-Niklas Bonk is the Academic Dean of the Vienna campus.

The Alma Mater Europaea University, Vienna, hosts Alma Mater AI Center, and several initiatives and projects including TheConf.org and ifg.at. TheConf.org is an academic conference report platform, and ifg.at is a project on Austrian freedom of information.

=== Buildings ===
Alma Mater Europaea has its headquarters in Slovenska Ulica 17, Maribor, Slovenia. Prior to July 2015 the headquarters were on Gosposka Ulica 1. The headquarters consist of several floors containing administration offices and several classrooms with capacities ranging from 20 to 150 students. The building is equipped with electronic equipment such as laptops, projectors, tablet computers, medical equipment for health care and physiotherapy programmes such as massage beds, inflatable balls, skeleton models etc.

== Career center ==
Alma Mater Europaea has a career center, which assists students with their employment. Employment rate of the Alma Mater Europaea graduates is the highest in the country.

== Accredited study programs ==
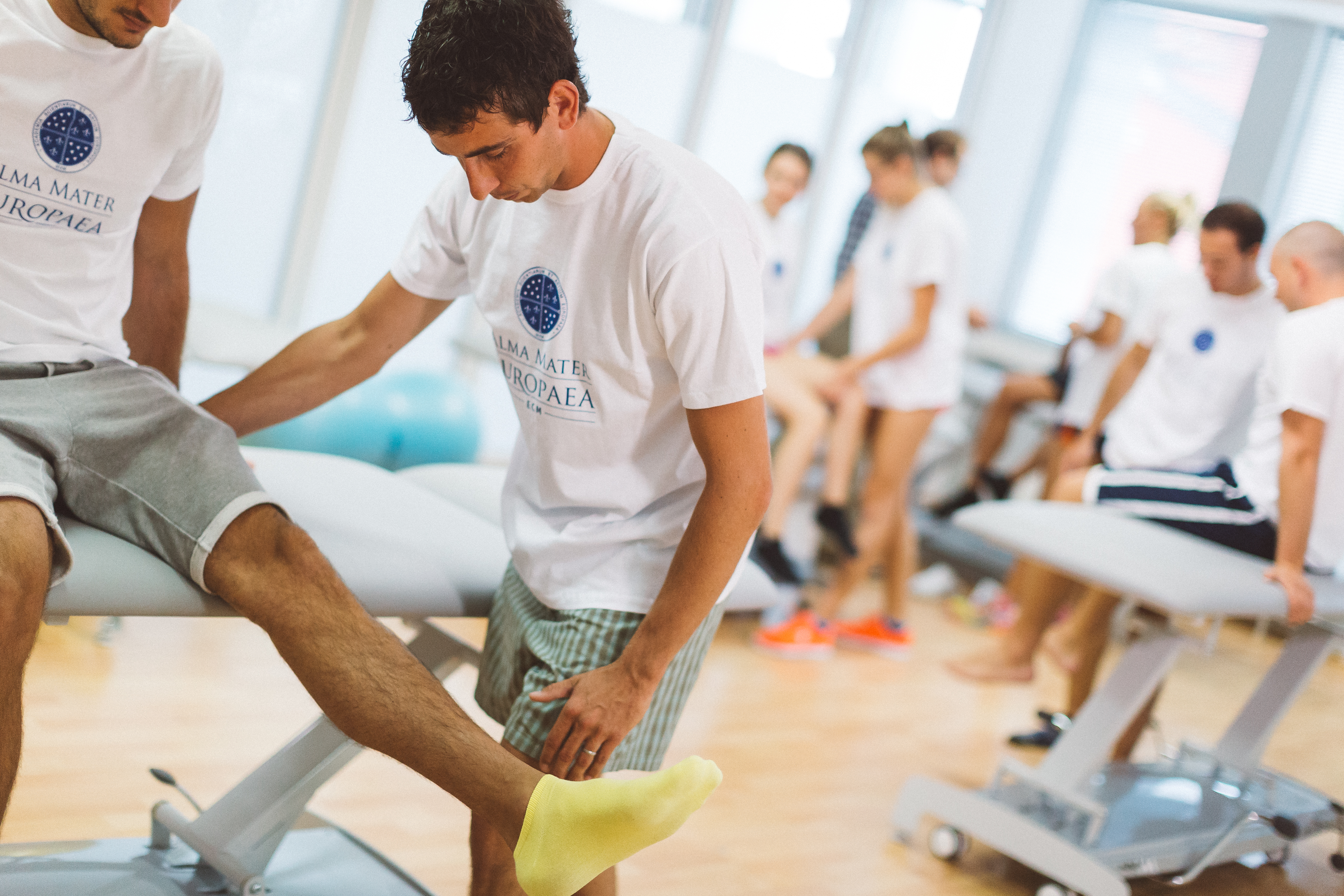
Physiotherapy students of Alma Mater Europaea

Study programs:

- Bachelor: Physiotherapy, Nursing, Social Gerontology, Humanities, Management, Archives Management, Dance, Choreography and Web and Information technologies
- Masters: Social Gerontology, Humanities, European business studies, Management, Project Management, Financial services, Archives and Records Management, Environmental studies, Complementary Health Sciences, Nursing, Physiotherapy, Dance studies, Web science and technology and Sustainable Development
- Doctor of Science (PhD): Social Gerontology, Humanities, Strategic Communication Management, Project Management, Physiotheraphy, Archival Sciences and Applied Artificial Intelligence

In 2012, the Institutum Studiorum Humanitatis (ISH) – Ljubljana, Faculty for the postgraduate studies of the Humanities and Dance Academym, became part of the Alma Mater Europaea University.

== Teaching and learning ==
=== International research and development programs ===
Some of the successful research projects include:

- Slovene Jews in Prekmurje and Štajerska: survival, remembering and revitalization (holder assistant professor Irena Šumi, Ph.D.)
- Suffrage of persons with special needs – Questions on regulation and improvement of implementation methods (holder assistant professor Jurij Toplak, Ph.D.)
- Cross-border innovation network for value analysis for the endorsement of value analysis as an innovative tool for successfulness enhancement of Slovene and Austrian companies

=== Apple 1-1 ===
The iPad one-to-one program uses technology that is already a big part of students’ lives to make them more excited about learning. Recognizing that students get most of their information from the internet, AMEU wanted to adapt their teaching methods to an increasingly digital world, to help students better prepare for real life. By incorporating digital literacy standards into the curriculum, the goal was to create a teaching environment using the same technology that students were already using outside school. Because it was important to move away from traditional textbooks, AMEU chose the iPad as a learning tool because it gives students access to the world as it is today. Giving students access to iPad also allows teachers to better adapt to their students’ unique needs and abilities. Students are no longer limited to writing essays and answering multiple-choice questions in order to demonstrate what they have learned.

=== Athletics ===
AMEU provides students with opportunities to participate in sporting events and has therefore formed several teams to compete in sports. As of now there is a football/soccer team, a volleyball team and basketball team all going by the name Team Alma Mater. The teams were formed in the study year 2014/2015 based on the initiative of the students and the student council. In the year 2016/2016 they elected the president of Team Alma Mater. The team competes in tournaments of futsal, volleyball and street basketball. Alma Mater Europaea also provides support for professional athletes competing in individual sports such as martial arts. Most of the professional athletes are students at the Physiotherapy program at Alma Mater Europaea.

== Organization and administration ==
=== Leadership ===
In accordance with the Alma Mater Europaea – ECM Statute following bodies operate within the organization:

=== Senate ===
The senate is one of the highest organizational bodies in the university. Its most important tasks are passing the statute, approving the curricula, participating in habilitation and appeals proceedings as well as making second instance decisions regarding study matters. The Senate is an expert body of the institution which decides on all expert issues of the institute. The Chairman of the institution is the President of the institution. Members of the Senate are appointed by the Academic Assembly for a period of two years or until the appointment of a new Chairman.

=== Management Board ===
The Management Board decides on material issues and ensures an unhindered business activity of the institution. The Management Board is a management body made up of five members – four representatives of the founder, two representatives of the institution and one representative of the students. The members are appointed for a period of four years and the representatives of the students for one year.

=== Rector ===
The Rector of Alma Mater Europaea University is Professor Dr. Ludvik Toplak. The heads of individual study programs constitute the Presidents’ collegium.

Professor Dr. Ludvik Toplak is an authoritative expert in law and member of the European Academy of Sciences and Arts. He studied law in Ljubljana, Belgrade, Novi Sad, New York, Oslo and Potsdam.

He is the author and co-author of numerous scientific and research articles and publications from the field of civil law, trade law and international trade law, ecology, intellectual property, human rights and especially social market economy. He worked in economy (1980-1987) and in politics as the president of Družbeno-politični zbor, the first democratically elected parliament of the Republic of Slovenia (1990-1993). For three mandates prof. Dr. Ludvik Toplak was the rector of the University of Maribor (1993-2002). From 2002-2006 he was the ambassador of the Republic of Slovenia to the Holy See. Today he is the vice-chancellor of Alma Mater Europaea - ECM University (founded by the European Academy of Sciences and Arts) and founder and president of the European Center, Maribor. Prof. Dr. Toplak is a member of the European Academy of Sciences and Arts, Rotary International and the Council of Legislation. He was the president of the Danube Rectors Conference, president of the Alps-Adriatic Rectors Conference, member of Bureau of the European Rectors conference, member of Bureau of the Confederation of European Union Rectors’ Conference and the International Conference on High Education.

=== Academic Assembly ===
The Academic Assembly is composed of all faculty and academic associates of Alma Mater Europaea and student representatives.

The Academic Assembly is made up of all the higher education teachers, research associates and higher education associates cooperating in the study programmes of the institution. In the 2014/2015 academic year, the Chairman of the Academic Assembly is Tomaž Klojčnik, MSc. Students are always invited to the session through the Student Council.

=== Student Council ===
The student council helps share student's ideas, interests and concerns. It is a representative body of the students and represents the students of the institution Members of the Student Council.
