= Lenart v Slovenskih Goricah =

Lenart v Slovenskih Goricah Sveti Lenart v Slovenskih goricah (until 1952)
- Town
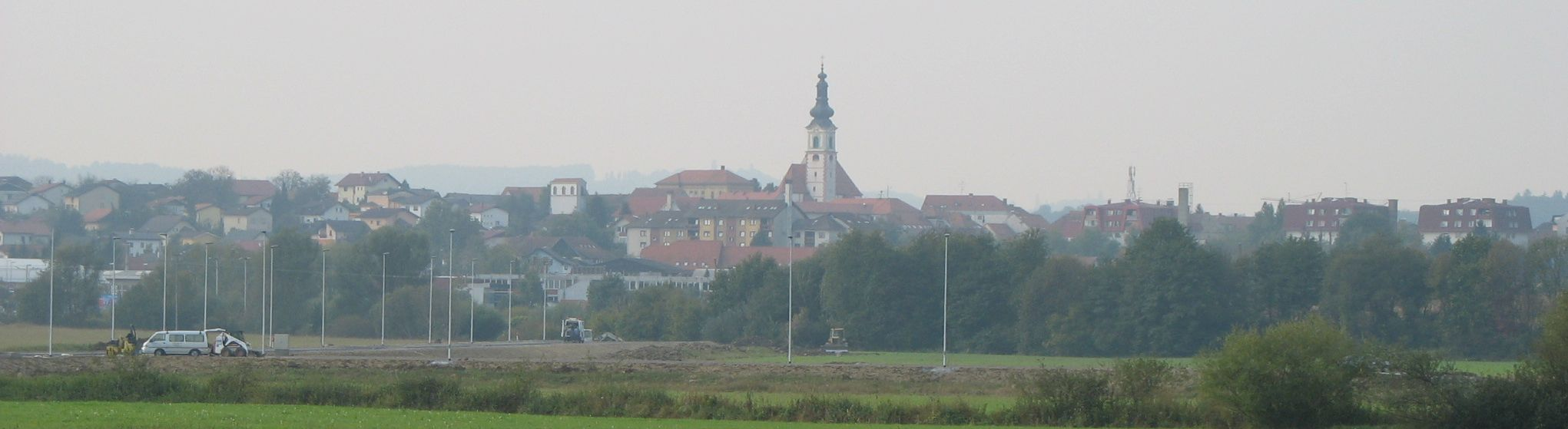
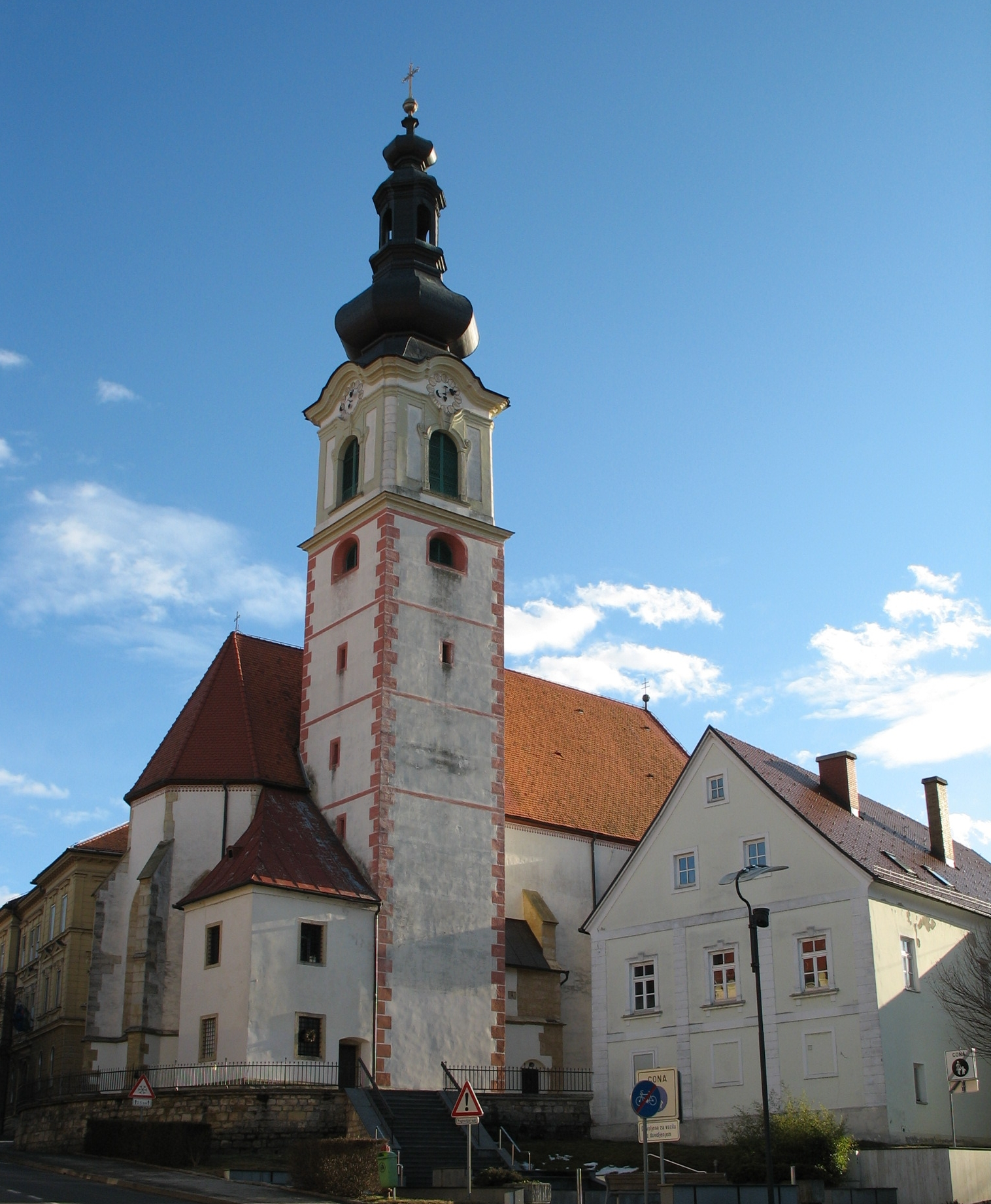
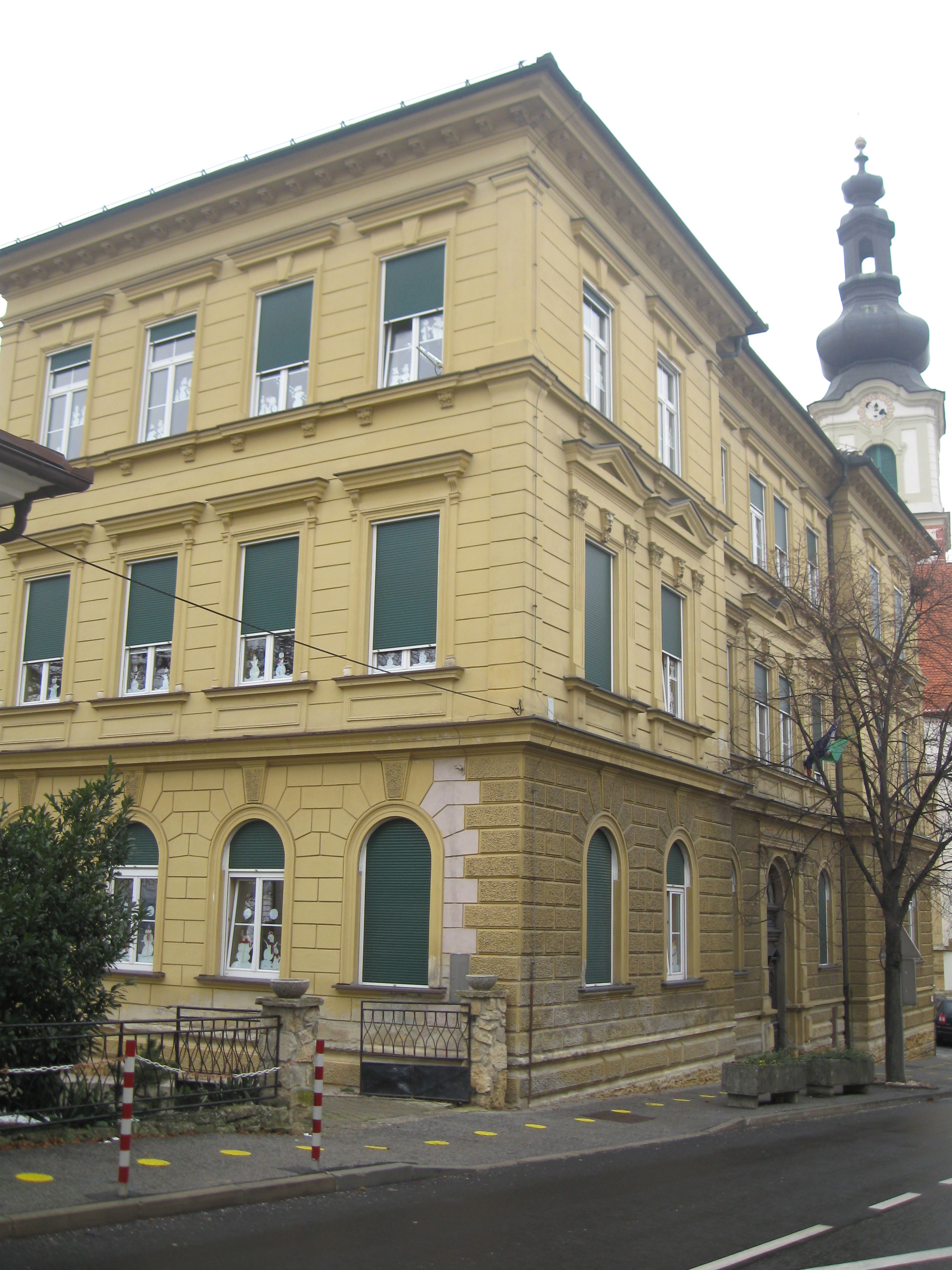
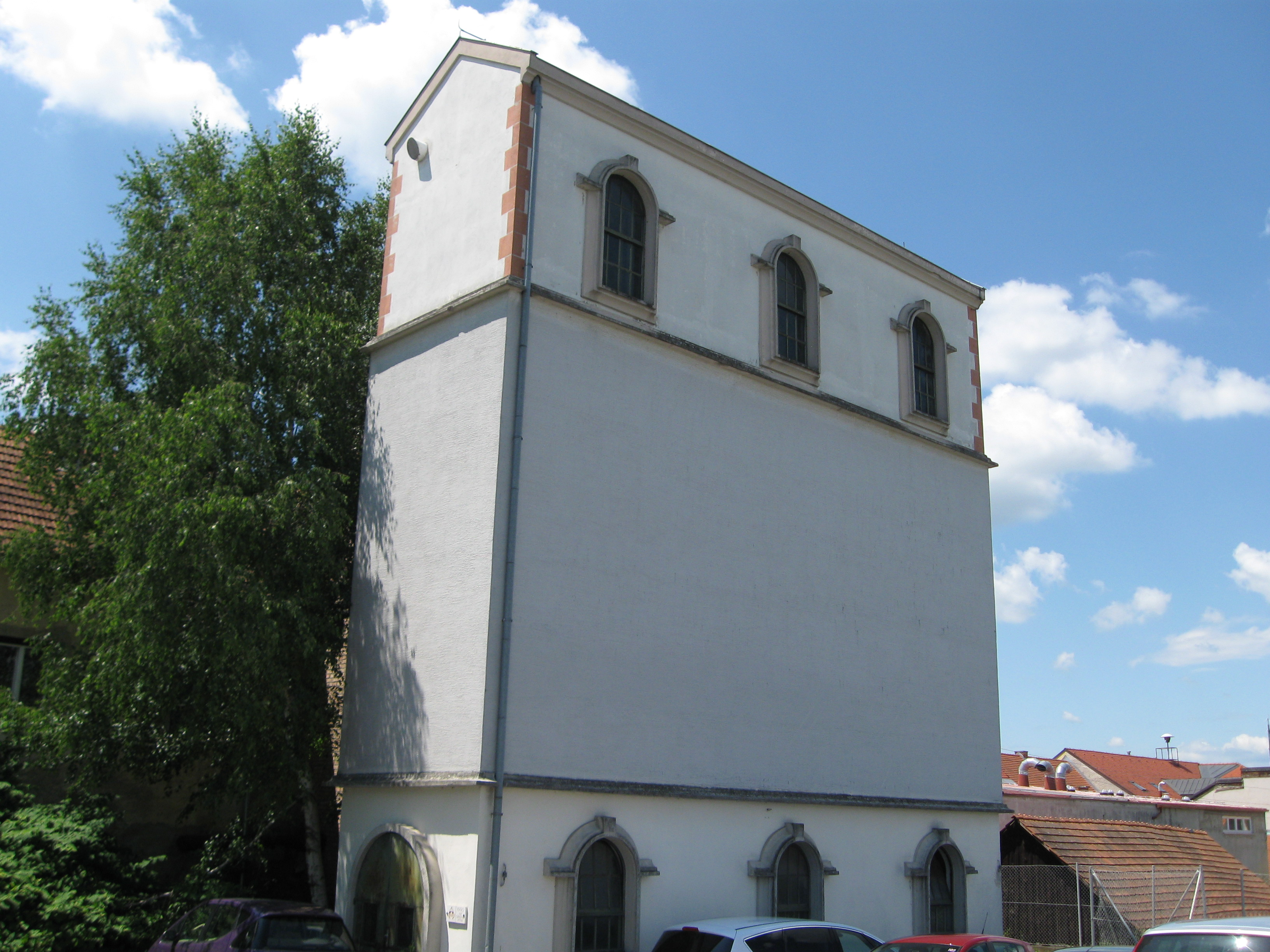
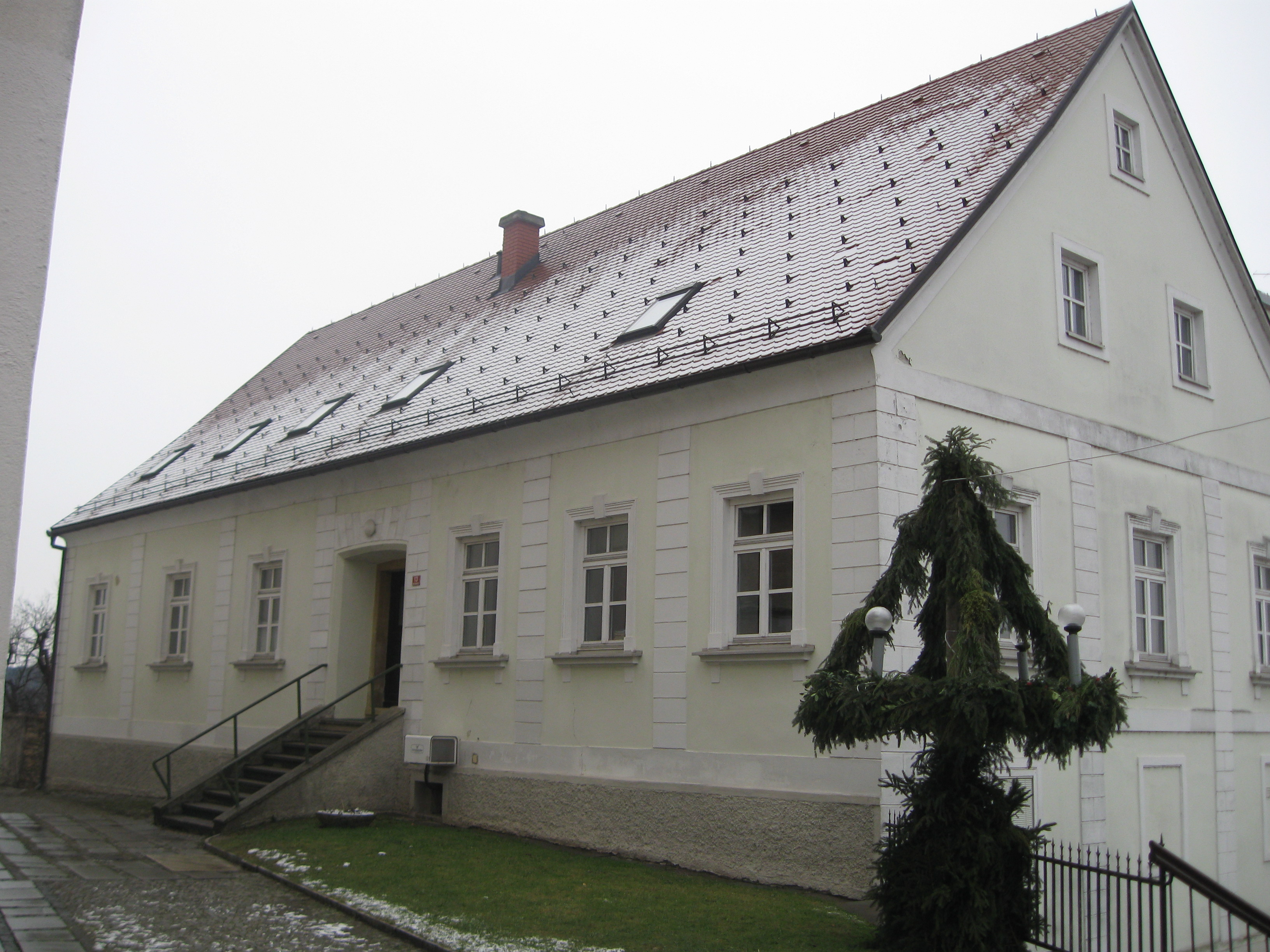
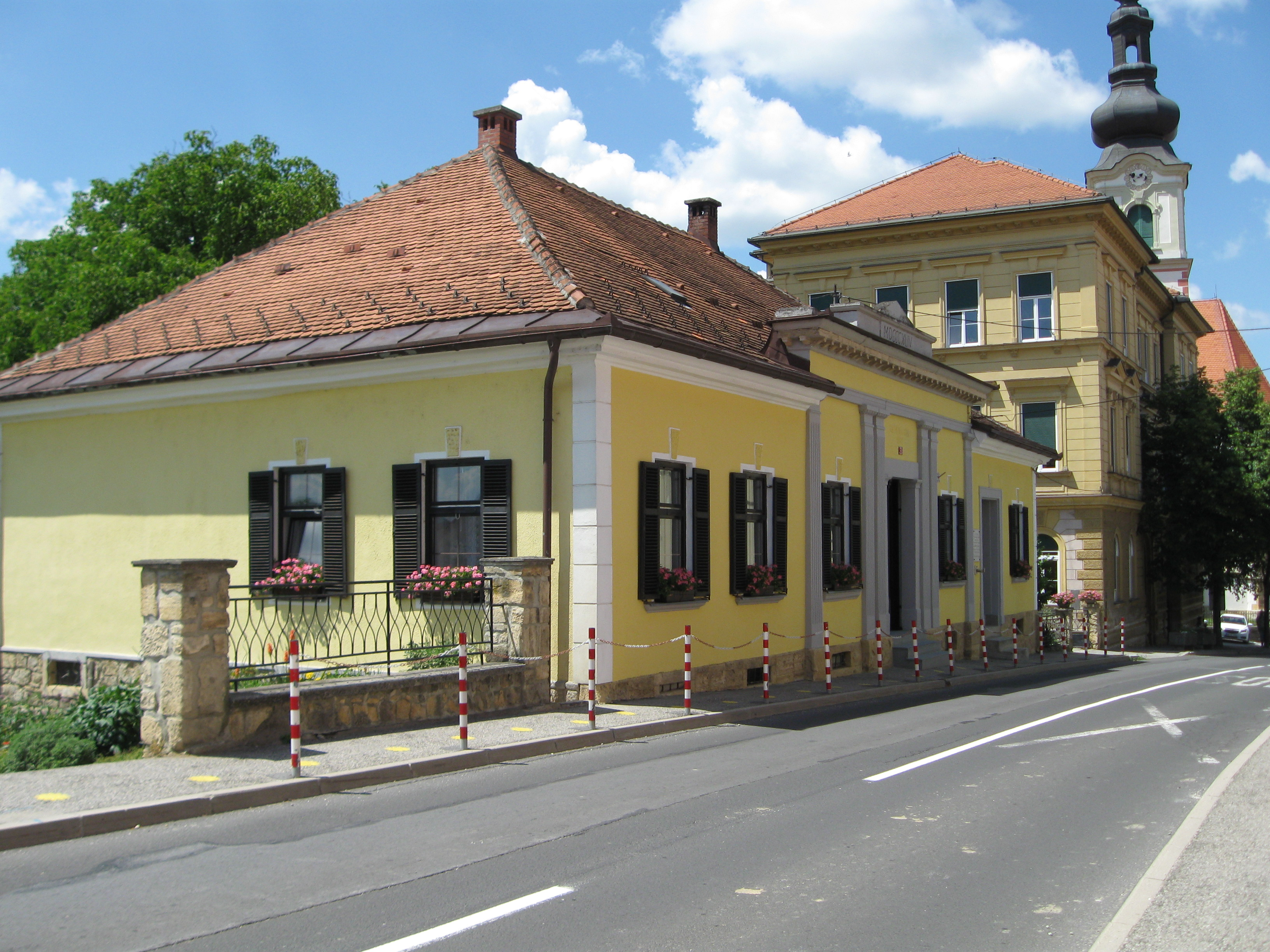
- From top, left to right: Lenart skyline, St. Leonard's Church, old school, former silo, rectory, Ilaunig's house

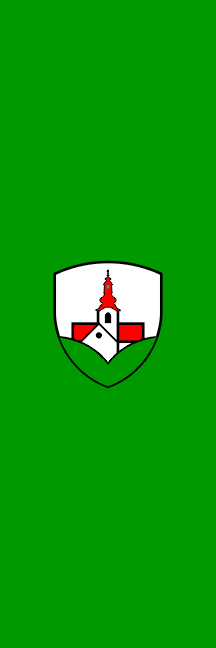
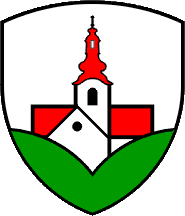
- Flag Coat of arms

- Location in Slovenia
- Coordinates: 46°34′27″N 15°49′56″E
- Country: Slovenia
- Traditional region: Styria
- Statistical region: Drava
- Municipality: Lenart
- Elevation: 264 m (866 ft)

Population (2023)
  - Total: 3,449
- Vehicle registration: MB

Lenart v Slovenskih Goricah (pronounced [ˈléːnaɾt ʍ slɔˈʋèːnskiɣ ɡɔˈɾìːtsax]; Slovene: Lenart v Slovenskih goricah, German: Sankt Leonhard in Windischbüheln) is a town in the Slovene Hills in the Municipality of Lenart in northeastern Slovenia. The area is part of the traditional region of Styria. It is now included in the Drava Statistical Region. It is the seat of the municipality.

== Name ==
The name of the settlement was changed from Sveti Lenart v Slovenskih goricah (literally, 'Saint Leonard in the Slovene Hills') to Lenart v Slovenskih goricah (literally, 'Leonard in the Slovene Hills') in 1952. The name was changed on the basis of the 1948 Law on Names of Settlements and Designations of Squares, Streets, and Buildings as part of efforts by Slovenia's postwar communist government to remove religious elements from toponyms.

Historical population
Year	Pop.	±%
1948	843	—
1953	904	+7.2%
1961	952	+5.3%
1971	1,145	+20.3%
1981	1,822	+59.1%
1991	2,531	+38.9%
2002	2,592	+2.4%
2011	3,006	+16.0%
2021	3,339	+11.1%
Population size may be affected by changes in administrative divisions.

== Notable people ==
Notable people that were born or lived in Lenart v Slovenskih Goricah include:

- Franc Breznik (born 1970), politician
- Vito Kraigher (1911–1945), communist politician
- Ožbolt Ilaunig (1876–1945), judge and author
- Janez Kramberger (born 1961), politician
- Franc Kramberger (born 1936), Roman Catholic prelate
- Camillo Morocutti (1893–?), politician and author
- Anton Murko (1809–1871), priest
- Luka Martin Tomažič (born 1988), legal scholar
- Marjan Toš (born 1957), historian and author
- Lojze Ude Jr. (born 1936), legal scholar
- Petra Weingerl (born 1987), legal scholar
