= Gradiščak =

- Location in Slovenia
- Coordinates: 46°29′22″N 15°57′1.9″E
- Country: Slovenia
- Traditional region: Styria
- Statistical region: Drava
- Municipality: Juršinci

Area
  - Total: 0.31 km^{2} (0.12 sq mi)
- Elevation: 309.6 m (1,016 ft)

Population (2002)
  - Total: 31

Gradiščak (pronounced [ˈɡɾaːdiʃtʃak]) is a small settlement in the Municipality of Juršinci in northeastern Slovenia. It lies on the western edge of the Slovene Hills (Slovene: Slovenske gorice), just east of Dragovič. The area is part of the traditional region of Styria. It is now included with the rest of the municipality in the Drava Statistical Region.
