= Anton Slodnjak =

Slovene literary historian (1899–1983)

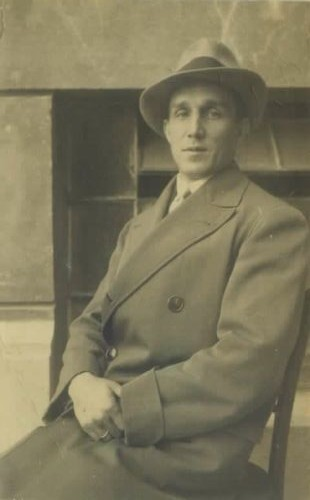
- Born: June 13, 1899; Bodkovci, Austria-Hungary
- Died: March 13, 1983 (aged 83); Ljubljana, Yugoslavia
- Occupation: Literary historian

Anton Slodnjak (pronounced [anˈtoːn ˈsloːdnjak], June 13, 1899 – March 13, 1983) was a Slovene literary historian, critic, writer, Prešeren scholar, and academy member.

Slodnjak was a full member of the Slovenian Academy of Sciences and Arts (SAZU) from 1967, and a corresponding member of the Yugoslav Academy (JAZU) in Zagreb and an associate professor at the University of Zagreb until 1950, when he returned to Ljubljana and taught Slavic studies at the University of Ljubljana's Faculty of Arts as a full professor of Slovenian literature of the 19th century until his retirement in 1959.

== Life ==
Anton Slodnjak was born in Bodkovci to Martin Slodnjak and Marjeta (née Nigl) Slodnjak in a wealthy farming family as the eldest of three sons. His father was a well-known organizer of ethnic events in Juršinci. Already in the 1870s, they had an educational society there and their own choir, which his father also sang in. He attended elementary school in Juršinci from 1906 to 1912, and in the fall of that year, at the advice of his teachers, his parents enrolled him in the high school in Maribor, where he graduated in 1920. He enrolled in the Slavic studies program at the University of Ljubljana and received his doctorate there in 1925 with a dissertation on Davorin Trstenjak. He also attended lectures in German studies, art history, and national history, and he passed the comprehensive exam in German language and literature and in national history. This was followed by research training as a teacher of Polish literature at the Jagiellonian University in Kraków from 1925 to 1927, where he also taught Slovenian. After returning to Ljubljana, he worked as a professor of Slovenian at the Trade Academy in Ljubljana from 1927 to 1945. During World War II, he collaborated with the Liberation Front and was arrested three times and imprisoned for lengthy periods (in 1941, 1942, and 1945). From 1945 to 1947 he was the acting head and then head of the Vocational Education Department at the Ministry of Trade and Supply. Then, in 1947, he became a professor of Slovene literature at the Department of Slavic Studies in Zagreb, and, after the death of France Kidrič in 1950, he assumed the position of full professor of Slovene literature at the Faculty of Arts in Ljubljana, where he was dean of the faculty from 1951 to 1952, and then from 1953 to 1959 (after the retirement of Rajko Nahtigal) the head of the Institute for Slavic Philology. In 1959, he was forcibly retired from these positions for ideological and political reasons, and he accepted the job of a visiting professor of Slovene, Croatian, and Serbian literature at the Goethe University Frankfurt. He returned to Slovenia by his own choice in 1965 and continued to engage in research work until his death. He was the head and after 1956 an honorary member of the Slavic Society of Slovenia, in 1950 he was made a research associate of Slovenian Academy of Sciences and Arts, and in 1967 he became a regular member of the academy. In 1948 he received the Prešeren Award, and in 1982 the Kidrič Award for his body of work on Fran Levstik. The University of Zagreb awarded him an honorary doctorate in 1970, and the Yugoslav Academy of Sciences and Arts elected him a corresponding member in 1977. His work was recognized by the Slavic Congress in Moscow in 1958 on the centenary of Adam Mickiewicz's death (1955), and the Polish Academy of Arts and Sciences recognized his merits.

== Selected works ==
- 1934: Pregled slovenskega slovstva
- 1938: Neiztrohnjeno srce
- 1946: Pogine naj – pes!
- 1964: Poezije in pisma
- 1964: Prešernovo življenje
- 1966: Študije in eseji
- 1968: Slovensko slovstvo: ob tisočletnici Brižinskih spomenikov
- 1976: Tujec
