= Rotman, Juršinci =

Rotman
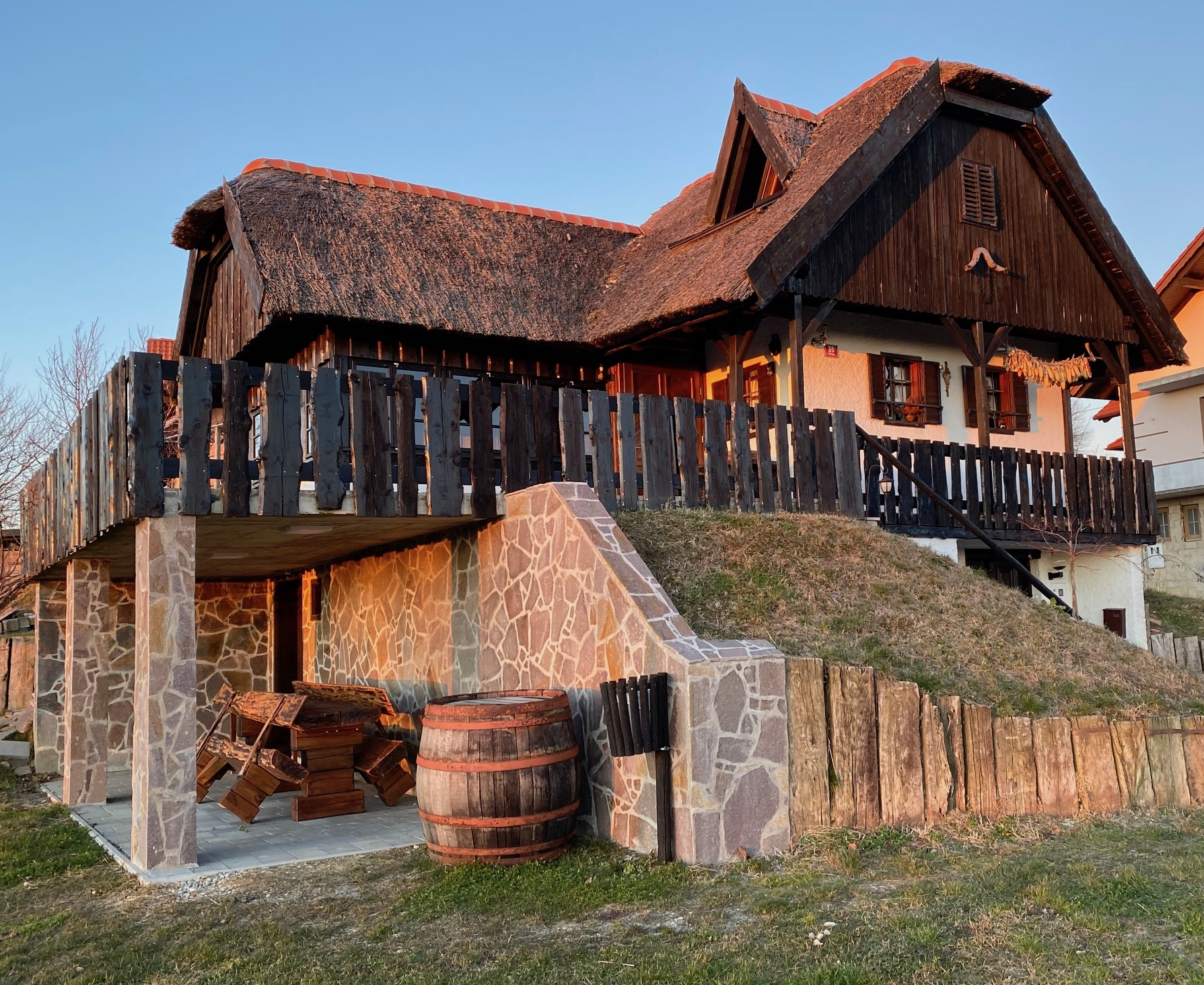
- A vineyard cottage in Rotman

- Location in Slovenia
- Coordinates: 46°28′48.38″N 15°58′50.09″E
- Country: Slovenia
- Traditional region: Styria
- Statistical region: Drava
- Municipality: Juršinci

Area
  - Total: 1.65 km^{2} (0.64 sq mi)
- Elevation: 317.7 m (1,042 ft)

Population (2002)
  - Total: 137

Rotman (pronounced [ɾoˈtmaːn]) is a settlement in the Municipality of Juršinci in northeastern Slovenia. It lies in the vineyard-covered Slovene Hills (Slovene: Slovenske gorice) in the traditional region of Styria. It is now included with the rest of the municipality in the Drava Statistical Region.

The village chapel-shrine with a belfry dates to the late 19th century.
