= Hlaponci =

- Location in Slovenia
- Coordinates: 46°28′5.07″N 15°58′38.53″E
- Country: Slovenia
- Traditional region: Styria
- Statistical region: Drava
- Municipality: Juršinci

Area
  - Total: 4.61 km^{2} (1.78 sq mi)
- Elevation: 228.4 m (749 ft)

Population (2002)
  - Total: 243

Hlaponci (pronounced [ˈxlaːpɔntsi]) is a settlement in the Municipality of Juršinci in northeastern Slovenia. It lies in the valley of a minor left tributary of the Pesnica River in the Slovene Hills (Slovene: Slovenske gorice). The area is part of the traditional region of Styria. It is now included with the rest of the municipality in the Drava Statistical Region.

A small chapel-shrine with a belfry in the southwestern part of the settlement was built in the second half of the 19th century.
