= Gabrnik, Juršinci =

Gabrnik
- Location in Slovenia
- Coordinates: 46°28′17.09″N 15°57′18.58″E
- Country: Slovenia
- Traditional region: Styria
- Statistical region: Drava
- Municipality: Juršinci

Area
  - Total: 3.46 km^{2} (1.34 sq mi)
- Elevation: 221.3 m (726 ft)

Population (2002)
  - Total: 244

Gabrnik (pronounced [ˈɡaːbəɾnik]) is a settlement on the edge of the Slovene Hills (Slovene: Slovenske gorice) in the Municipality of Juršinci in northeastern Slovenia. The area is part of the traditional region of Styria. It is now included with the rest of the municipality in the Drava Statistical Region.

The local chapel-shrine with a belfry in the southern part of the settlement was built in the early 20th century.

Gabrnik is the home village of Dejan Zavec, the only Slovenian boxer ever to hold a world boxing champion title.
