= Bodkovci =

- Location in Slovenia
- Coordinates: 46°29′34.03″N 16°0′6.13″E
- Country: Slovenia
- Traditional region: Styria
- Statistical region: Drava
- Municipality: Juršinci

Area
  - Total: 2.73 km^{2} (1.05 sq mi)
- Elevation: 249.8 m (820 ft)

Population (2002)
  - Total: 106

Bodkovci (pronounced [ˈboːtkɔu̯tsi], German: Wotkovetz) is a settlement in the Slovene Hills (Slovene: Slovenske gorice) in the Municipality of Juršinci in northeastern Slovenia. The area is part of the traditional region of Styria. It is now included with the rest of the municipality in the Drava Statistical Region.

== Notable people ==
Notable people that were born in Bodkovci include:

- Anton Slodnjak (1899–1983), Slavic specialist and literary historian
