= Zagorci =

- Location in Slovenia
- Coordinates: 46°30′34.78″N 15°58′30.89″E
- Country: Slovenia
- Traditional region: Styria
- Statistical region: Drava
- Municipality: Juršinci

Area
  - Total: 4.61 km^{2} (1.78 sq mi)
- Elevation: 274.5 m (901 ft)

Population (2002)
  - Total: 309

Zagorci (pronounced [ˈzaːɡɔɾtsi]) is a settlement in the Municipality of Juršinci in northeastern Slovenia. The area is part of the traditional region of Styria. It lies in the valley of Little Brnca Creek (Slovene: Mala Brnca), a minor left tributary of the Pesnica River, and the surrounding Slovene Hills (Slovene: Slovenske gorice). It is now included with the rest of the municipality in the Drava Statistical Region.
