= Kukava =

- Location in Slovenia
- Coordinates: 46°28′08″N 15°57′46″E
- Country: Slovenia
- Traditional region: Styria
- Statistical region: Drava
- Municipality: Juršinci

Area
  - Total: 2 km^{2} (0.77 sq mi)
- Elevation: 300.7 m (987 ft)

Population (2002)
  - Total: 208

Kukava (pronounced [ˈkuːkaʋa]) is a settlement on the western edge of the Slovene Hills (Slovene: Slovenske gorice) in the Municipality of Juršinci in northeastern Slovenia. The area is part of the traditional region of Styria and is now included with the rest of the municipality in the Drava Statistical Region.

A small chapel-shrine with a belfry in the settlement was built in 1931 on the site of an older church demolished in the late 18th century.
