= Grlinci =

- Location in Slovenia
- Coordinates: 46°30′11.41″N 15°56′40.72″E
- Country: Slovenia
- Traditional region: Styria
- Statistical region: Drava
- Municipality: Juršinci

Area
  - Total: 3.38 km^{2} (1.31 sq mi)
- Elevation: 223.9 m (735 ft)

Population (2002)
  - Total: 126

Grlinci (pronounced [ˈɡəɾlintsi]) is a settlement in the Municipality of Juršinci in northeastern Slovenia. It lies on the eastern edge of the Slovene Hills (Slovene: Slovenske gorice) in the traditional region of Styria. It is now included with the rest of the municipality in the Drava Statistical Region.

The village chapel-shrine with a belfry was built in the early 20th century.
