= Senčak pri Juršincih =

- Location in Slovenia
- Coordinates: 46°30′24.92″N 16°0′1.72″E
- Country: Slovenia
- Traditional region: Styria
- Statistical region: Drava
- Municipality: Juršinci

Area
  - Total: 2.05 km^{2} (0.79 sq mi)
- Elevation: 335.8 m (1,102 ft)

Population (2002)
  - Total: 92

Senčak pri Juršincih (pronounced [ˈseːntʃak pɾi ˈjuːɾʃintsix], German: Sentschak) is a settlement in the Slovene Hills (Slovene: Slovenske gorice) in the Municipality of Juršinci in northeastern Slovenia. The area is part of the traditional region of Styria and is now included in the Drava Statistical Region.

== Name ==
The name of the settlement was changed from Senčak to Senčak pri Juršincih in 1955.

== Cultural heritage ==
A small chapel-shrine known as the Vrabel Shrine (Vrablova kapelica) was built in the village after the end of the First World War.
