= Johann Puch =

Businessman (1862–1914)

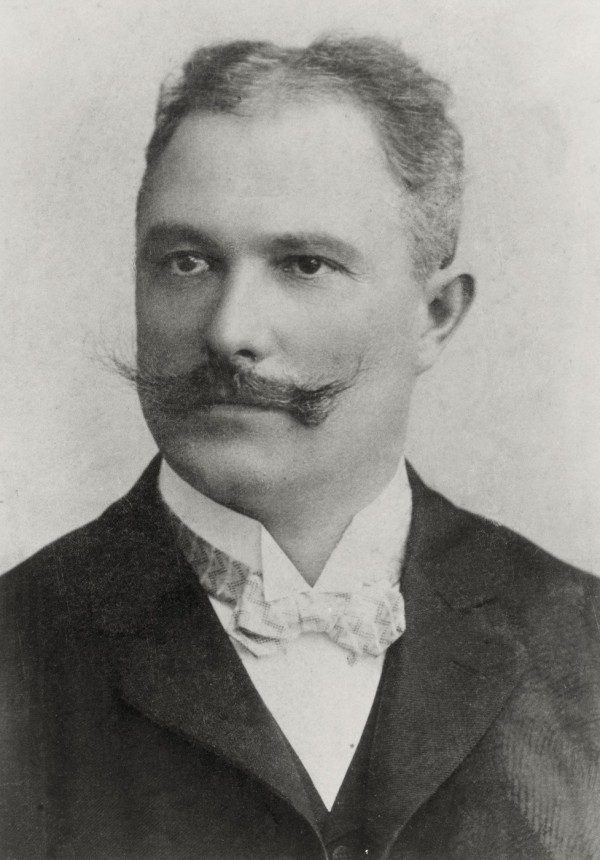
- Born: 27 June 1862; Sakušak, Styria, Austrian Empire
- Died: 19 July 1914 (aged 52); Zagreb, Austria-Hungary
- Resting place: Graz, Austria
- Citizenship: Austro-Hungarian
- Occupations: Craftsman, industrialist, automotive pioneer
- Known for: Puch AG & Co. KG

Johann Puch (Slovene: Janez Puh, 27 June 1862 – 19 July 1914) was a Slovene inventor and mechanic who went on to become the founder of the Austrian Puch automobile plants, then one of the most significant vehicle producers in Europe.

== Biography ==
Johann Puch was born on 27 June 1862 to Slovene peasants at house no. 79 in Sakušak near Ptuj, part of Lower Styria, Slovenia. He was the son of the cottager Franz Puch and Agnes Ziserl Puch, and he was baptized Johann Puch the same day in Juršinci. The eldest son of nine children, he left his family home at the age of eight and at twelve apprenticed as a locksmith in Ptuj. Having finished his training in 1877, he moved to the Styrian capital Graz, where he did his military service and from 1885 worked for several employers. He concentrated on bicycle manufacturing and soon became a noted specialist. On 18 September 1889, he married Maria Anna Reinitzhuber at the cathedral in Graz.

In 1889, Puch travelled to a bicycle trade fair in Leipzig, where he concluded a contract with Thomas Humber's cycle company. The same year he founded his first workshop in Graz and started to distribute Styria safety bicycles. His enterprise quickly expanded and in 1891 he founded the Johann Puch & Comp. trading company with 34 employees, selling bicycles all over Austria-Hungary, as well as exporting to the United Kingdom and France. Racers on Styria bicycles were successful in long-distance road races, most notably Josef Fischer, winner of the first edition of Paris–Roubaix in 1896. At that time, Puch already employed more than 300 workers and sold about 6,000 bicycle per annum.

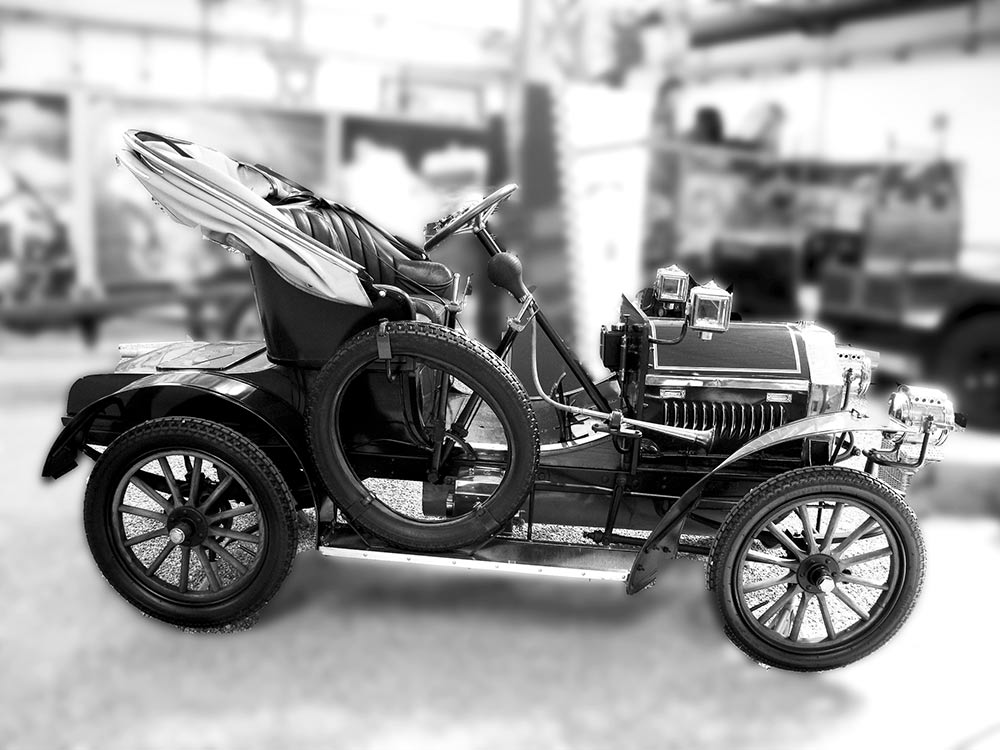
1906 Puch Voiturette

His achievements but also discrepancies with his affiliates led to the founding of his own manufacturing company in 1899, called Johann Puch - Erste steiermärkische Fahrrad-Fabriks-Actien Gesellschaft (First Styrian Bicycle Stock Company) in Graz. The company started producing motorcycles in 1903 and automobiles in 1904. By 1912 Puch's factory employed 1,100 workers and manufactured 300 cars, 300 motorcycles and 16,000 bicycles per year. He retired in 1912 but remained honorary president of the company.

Up to 1914, Puch developed 21 different types of cars, and also lorries, buses, military and some other special vehicles, including sedan limousines for the imperial Habsburg family. He successfully obtained patents for more than 35 inventions and improvements. He died of a stroke while attending a horserace in Zagreb.

The Puch company manufactured vehicles for the Austro-Hungarian Army during World War I. Puch's motorcycles and cars were successful in races and rallies all over Europe and carried his name among vehicle producers. From 1934 the tradition was continued by the Steyr-Daimler-Puch company in Graz and Vienna.

== See also ==
- Austro-Daimler
- Magna Steyr
