= Sakušak =

- Location in Slovenia
- Coordinates: 46°30′0.25″N 15°58′53.26″E
- Country: Slovenia
- Traditional region: Styria
- Statistical region: Drava
- Municipality: Juršinci

Area
  - Total: 2.43 km^{2} (0.94 sq mi)
- Elevation: 274.9 m (902 ft)

Population (2002)
  - Total: 203

Sakušak (pronounced [ˈsaːkuʃak], in older sources also Sakošak, German: Sakuschak) is a settlement in the Slovene Hills (Slovene: Slovenske gorice) in the Municipality of Juršinci in northeastern Slovenia. The area is part of the traditional region of Styria. It is now included with the rest of the municipality in the Drava Statistical Region.

The inventor Johann Puch was born in the village in 1862. The house in which he was born, Sakušak no. 79, has been included by the Slovenian Ministry of Culture on its list of heritage locations.
