= Karsten Fischer (political scientist) =

German political scientist

- Born: 1967 (age 58–59) in Kleve; North Rhine-Westphalia, Germany

Education
- Education: University of Bonn; Goethe University Frankfurt; Humboldt University of Berlin

Karsten Fischer (born 1967 in Kleve) is a German political scientist and a historian of political ideas. He is a professor of Political Theory at LMU Munich.

== Biography ==
Fischer was born 1967 in Kleve, North Rhine-Westphalia in Germany. He studied Political science, Philosophy and Public international law at the University of Bonn and Goethe University Frankfurt. He earned 1998 a PhD (summa cum laude) at the Humboldt University of Berlin with a dissertation titled "Verwilderte Selbsterhaltung. Zivilisationstheoretische Kulturkritik bei Nietzsche, Freud, Weber und Adorno". Between 1994 and until Fischer completed his thesis in 1998, he was awarded the Studienstiftung scholarship. His doctoral advisor was Herfried Münkler.

Fischer was from 1998 to 2002 Postdoctoral Research Fellow and coordinator of the interdisciplinary research group Common Good and Civic Spirit at the Berlin-Brandenburg Academy of Sciences and Humanities. In this research group he worked with some of the most brilliant minds of contemporary political theory in Germany, e.g. Ernst-Wolfgang Böckenförde, Claus Offe, Iring Fetscher, Christian Meier, Otfried Höffe and Klaus von Beyme.

He was from 2003 to 2006 Assistant Professor and from 2006 to 2009 Associate Professor at Humboldt University of Berlin, where he started an interdisciplinary program on Religion, Politics and Economics. In 2006 he received the venia legendi with a habilitation thesis under the supervision of Herfried Münkler.

He is since 2010 Full Professor (W3-Chair) at LMU Munich.

He has been invited professor at Free University of Berlin, Technische Universität Darmstadt, University of Greifswald, WHU – Otto Beisheim School of Management and Zeppelin University.

== Publications ==
Fischer's research focuses on political theory and the history of ideas, particularly democracy theory, liberalism theory, theories of statehood, constitutionalism, politics and law and the effects of religion on politics.

Selected works (in German)

- "Verwilderte Selbsterhaltung". Zivilisationstheoretische Kulturkritik bei Nietzsche, Freud, Weber und Adorno (= Politische Ideen. Band 10). Akademie Verlag, Berlin 1999, ISBN 3-05-003464-5.
- Moralkommunikation der Macht. Politische Konstruktion sozialer Kohäsion im Wohlfahrtsstaat. VS – Verlag für Sozialwissenschaften, Wiesbaden 2006, ISBN 3-531-15332-3.
- Die Zukunft einer Provokation. Religion im liberalen Staat. Berlin University Press, Berlin 2009, ISBN 978-3-940432-65-0.

He publishes (mainly in German) in various German Journals, such as The Journal of Political Philosophy, Merkur, Politische Vierteljahresschrift, Zeitschrift für Politische Theorie, Leviathan – Berliner Zeitschrift für Sozialwissenschaft, or Berliner Journal für Soziologie. He also writes regularly opinion pieces for mainstream publications in German-language media, such as Süddeutsche Zeitung, and Frankfurter Allgemeine Zeitung.
