= Manuel Knoll =

Manuel Andreas Knoll (born 19 November 1964 in Munich) is a contemporary German scholar and Professor of Political Theory and Philosophy. After three full professorship awards in Istanbul (2011–2023), in January 2024 he moved back to LMU Munich where he is a Privatdozent.

Knoll studied philosophy, Political Science and History at LMU Munich, where he also received his doctorate in 2000 for a work on Theodor W. Adorno.
In 2008 he acquired his Habilitation and venia legendi for Political Theory and Philosophy. His Habilitationsschrift examined Aristotle's views on social and political justice and includes an extensive critique of Martha Nussbaum's social democratic interpretation of Aristotle. He currently lives and teaches in Istanbul and Munich.
His 2011 essay defending the unity of Aristotle's Politics sparked a controversy with Eckart Schütrumpf, a scholar supporting developmentalist views. The contentious essays debating the topic were published in Zeitschrift für Politik.
Since 2013 he is a member of the Research Institute "Lucio Anneo Séneca", Universidad Carlos III de Madrid.
On June 18, 2016, he received the Colletti Award (Premio Lucio Colletti) for outstanding work in the field of philosophy on Capitoline Hill in Rome, Italy.
Since 2021 he is an associate editor of the Journal "Polis. The Journal for Ancient Greek and Roman Political Thought".

== Writings ==
- New Perspectives on Distributive Justice. Deep Disagreements, Pluralism, and the Problem of Consensus, ed. together with Stephen Snyder and Nurdane Şimşek, Walter De Gruyter, Berlin/Boston 2019.
- Textbook Ancient Greek Philosophy (De Gruyter Studienbuch Antike Griechische Philosophie), published by Walter de Gruyter, Berlin/Boston 2017.
- Platons Nomoi. Die politische Herrschaft von Vernunft und Gesetz, ed. together with Francisco L. Lisi, Vol. 100 of series Staatsverständnisse ed. by Rüdiger Voigt, Nomos Verlag Baden Baden 2017.
- Michael Walzer. Sphären der Gerechtigkeit. Ein kooperativer Kommentar (with a preface by Michael Walzer). Ed. together with Michael Spieker. (Series Staatsdiskurse). Stuttgart, Franz Steiner 2014. In 248 libraries According to WorldCat,
- Nietzsche as Political Philosopher. Ed. together with Barry Stocker. (Series Nietzsche Today). Berlin/Boston, De Gruyter 2014.
- Das Staatsdenken der Renaissance – Vom gedachten zum erlebten Staat. Ed. together with Stefano Saracino. (Series Staatsverständnisse). Baden Baden, Nomos 2013.
- Niccolò Machiavelli – Die Geburt des Staates. Ed. together with Stefano Saracino. Series Staatsdiskurse. Stuttgart, Franz Steiner 2010.
- Aristokratische oder demokratische Gerechtigkeit? Die politische Philosophie des Aristoteles und Martha Nussbaums egalitaristische Rezeption. Munich, Fink 2009.
- Theodor W. Adorno. Ethik als erste Philosophie. Munich, Fink 2002.
