= Werner Weidenfeld =

German political scientist

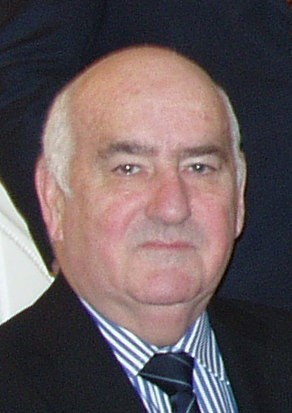
Werner Weidenfeld, in 2011.

Werner Weidenfeld (born 2 July 1947, Cochem) is a German political scientist. He was a political advisor for Germany–United States relations under different chancellors. He currently serves as rector of the Alma Mater Europaea.

== Biography ==
Weidenfeld studied political science, history and philosophy at the University of Bonn. In 1971 Weidenfeld received his PhD in Bonn with a dissertation about Gustav Stresemann's policies towards England. In 1975, he obtained his habilitation in political science at the University of Mainz with a thesis on German European policy in the Adenauer era.

From 1975 to 1995, he was professor of political science at the University of Mainz. He was also a professor associé at the Sorbonne in Paris between 1986 and 1988. From 1987 to 1999, he worked under Helmut Kohl as the German government's coordinator for German-American cooperation. In 2013, he expressed on national German TV a bleak view of German-American relations.

In 1992, Weidenfeld became a member of the Bertelsmann Stiftung Executive Board in Gütersloh. Since 1995, he was Full Professor of Political Systems and European Unification at the Geschwister Scholl Institute for Political Science at LMU Munich. Since 2000 he has also been a permanent visiting professor at the Chinese People's University in Beijing. Weidenfeld was retired from his position as professor emeritus for the summer semester 2013. Klaus H. Goetz from the University of Potsdam was appointed as his successor.

Until 2005, Weidenfeld was editor of the journal Internationale Politik.

In 2012, he was appointed Rector of the Alma Mater Europaea by the European Academy of Sciences and Arts. He took up this position after his retirement from LMU Munich in 2013. Until 2015 he was also a visiting professor at the Zeppelin University.
