= Dragovič, Juršinci =

Dragovič
- Location in Slovenia
- Coordinates: 46°29′33.14″N 15°57′26.01″E
- Country: Slovenia
- Traditional region: Styria
- Statistical region: Drava
- Municipality: Juršinci

Area
  - Total: 1.46 km^{2} (0.56 sq mi)
- Elevation: 322.2 m (1,057 ft)

Population (2002)
  - Total: 145

Dragovič (pronounced [dɾaɡɔˈʋitʃ]) is a village in the Slovene Hills (Slovene: Slovenske gorice) in the Municipality of Juršinci in northeastern Slovenia. The area is part of the traditional region of Styria. It is now included with the rest of the municipality in the Drava Statistical Region.

A chapel-shrine with a belfry, on a small hill in the hamlet of Aleluja, was built in the early 20th century.
