= Ludvik Toplak =

Slovenian politician (born 1942)

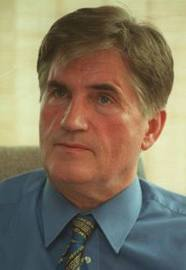
- Ludvik Toplak
- Born: Ludvik Toplak; July 13, 1942 (age 84); Mostje, Slovenia
- Education: PhD, LL.M., Law Degree
- Alma mater: University of Ljubljana, University of Novi Sad
- Occupations: Law professor, Ambassador, Politician, President of University

Ludvik Toplak (born July 13, 1942) is a Slovenian law professor and academic administrator, and former politician, ambassador, and member of the Parliament. He is the rector of the Alma Mater Europaea university and former rector of the University of Maribor. He is a member of the European Academy of Sciences and Arts.

== Academic career ==
Toplak taught at the University of Maribor Faculty of Law since 1973. In 1974 he received LL.M. from New York University and in 1980 he received PhD. His post-doctoral research was done at various universities and institutions worldwide, including State University of New York at Potsdam, New York. Between 1980 and 1987 he was Vice-President of Iskra Delta Computers corporation. In the late 1980s and early 1990s he was active in the democratization and independence movement in Slovenia add was a signatory of the declaration of independence of Slovenia from post-Tito Yugoslavia. He was a member of the pro-democracy coalition Demos and of Slovenian People's Party. In 1990 he was elected to the Slovenian Parliament and during Slovenia's independence he served as the speaker of the Socio-Political Chamber of the Slovenian Parliament. In 1992 he was reelected to the Parliament, but resigned in 1993 after being elected a rector of the University of Maribor. From 2002 to 2006 he was an Ambassador to the Vatican.

After serving as speaker of the Socio-Political Chamber of the Slovenian Parliament (1999–1992), as a member of the Parliament (1992–1993), as a rector of the University of Maribor (1993–2002), and as an Ambassador to the Holy See (2002–2006), he founded Alma Mater Europaea - Evropski center, Maribor in 2007, which in 2010 became part of the Alma Mater Europaea international university. Since the founding in 2007, Toplak served as the president. In March 2024, Alma Mater Europaea became a fully-fledged university and Toplak became its rector.

Ludvik Toplak served as a member of the presidency of the European Rectors' Conference and as a president of the Danube Rectors' Conference. He also served as a governor of the United States Chamber of Commerce in Slovenia.

== Awards ==
In 2000 he was awarded the Ambassador of the Republic of Slovenia in Science award. In 2022, he was awarded the Golden Order of Merit of the Republic of Slovenia for his outstanding contribution to the democratization and independence of Slovenia and its international and academic standing.

== Personal life ==
Ludvik Toplak is the father of law professor Jurij Toplak and lawyer Barbara Toplak.
