= Alma Mater Europaea =

International university based in Austria

- Other names: Alma Mater
- Motto: European University for Leadership
- Established: 2010
- President: Felix Unger
- Rector: Werner Weidenfeld
- Academic staff: 380
- Students: 2150
- Undergraduates: 1480
- Postgraduates: 540
- Doctoral students: 130
- Location: Salzburg, Austria
- Campus: campuses in Austria, Slovenia
- Colors: Blue, yellow
- Affiliations: European Academy of Sciences and Arts
- Website: www.almamater.eu www.almamater.si www.almamater.at

Alma Mater Europaea (AMEU) is an international university network based in Salzburg, Austria, and Alma Mater Europaea University, its major member, is a university in Slovenia, with campuses in several European cities.

== History ==
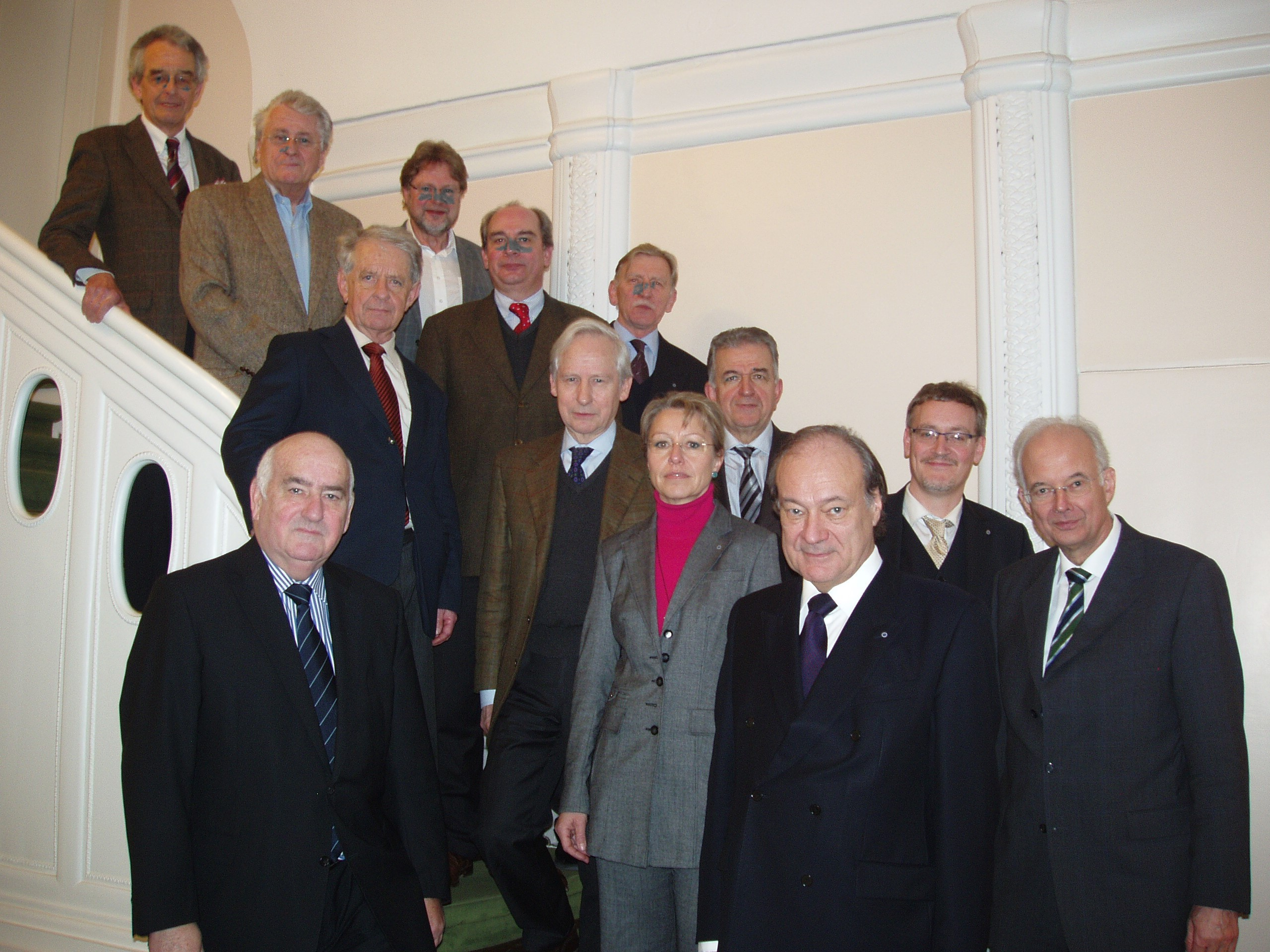
Representatives of the academy meeting in Munich in 2011 to plan the activities of Alma Mater Europaea

Since the early 2000s, the European Academy of Sciences and Arts has been planning the establishment of the university, occasionally with the subtitle of European University for Leadership.

In 2010, the European Academy officially established the Alma Mater Europaea, with Austrian surgeon and European Academy president Felix Unger appointed as the international university's first president, the German political scientist Werner Weidenfeld becoming the first rector, and the Slovenian lawyer, former rector and diplomat Ludvik Toplak the first prorector.

At a meeting in Munich in February 2011, under the patronage of the presidents of 12 European Union member states, the European Academy board determined that numerous courses would be taught at several European universities in different languages, including English, German, and Spanish. In line with the international nature of the university, students, teachers, and European thinkers would meet at an international symposium at the graduation. They also decided that Alma Mater Europaea would be incorporated in European and international networks of universities through cooperation agreements. At the meeting it was decided that in the first stage, Alma Mater Europaea would start three two-year master's degree programs. The university board stated that Alma Mater Europaea would be based on three so-called "W principles": Wissenschaft, Wirtschaft, Wirken. In German, this means: Science, Economy, Effect.

The 2013 graduation ceremony at the campus in Maribor

In 2011, the university opened in Slovenia its first campus in Maribor, Slovenia. This campus enrolled about 500 students in 2011. In July 2011 the university co-sponsored a summer school in St. Gallen, Switzerland. In 2012, about 800 students were enrolled, the campus in Zagreb, Croatia, opened, and the master's degree studies were partially carried out in Brussels. In 2013, the Salzburg campus of Alma Mater Europaea was established and about 1000 students studied in doctoral, masters, and undergrad programs in Austria, Slovenia, and other countries. In 2014, two higher education institutions joined Alma Mater Europaea. One is Institutum Studiorum Humanitatis (ISH), internationally renown graduate school of philosophy, established in 1992, with which Slavoj Žižek had been affiliated. The other one is the Dance Academy, established in 2008. It is one of the few European institutions issuing government accredited degrees in dance arts. In 2014, studies in Switzerland and Italy started. Ludvik Toplak has served as the president since the university's inception in Slovenia, and Jurij Toplak served as its provost between 2016 and 2022.

In March 2024, Alma Mater Europaea obtained accreditation as a university in Slovenia. It holds an institutional university accreditation, and all of its programs are accredited by the Slovenian Higher Education Agency (Nakvis).

== Locations and departments ==
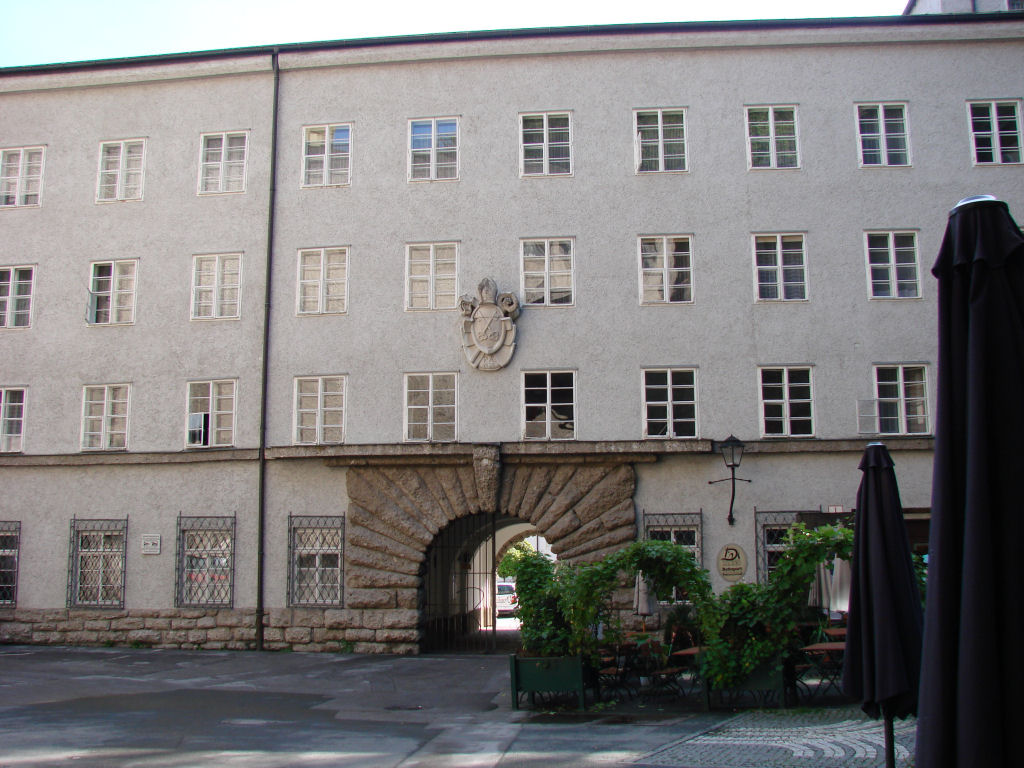
Alma Mater Europaea headquarters at Sankt Peter Bezirk in Salzburg, Austria

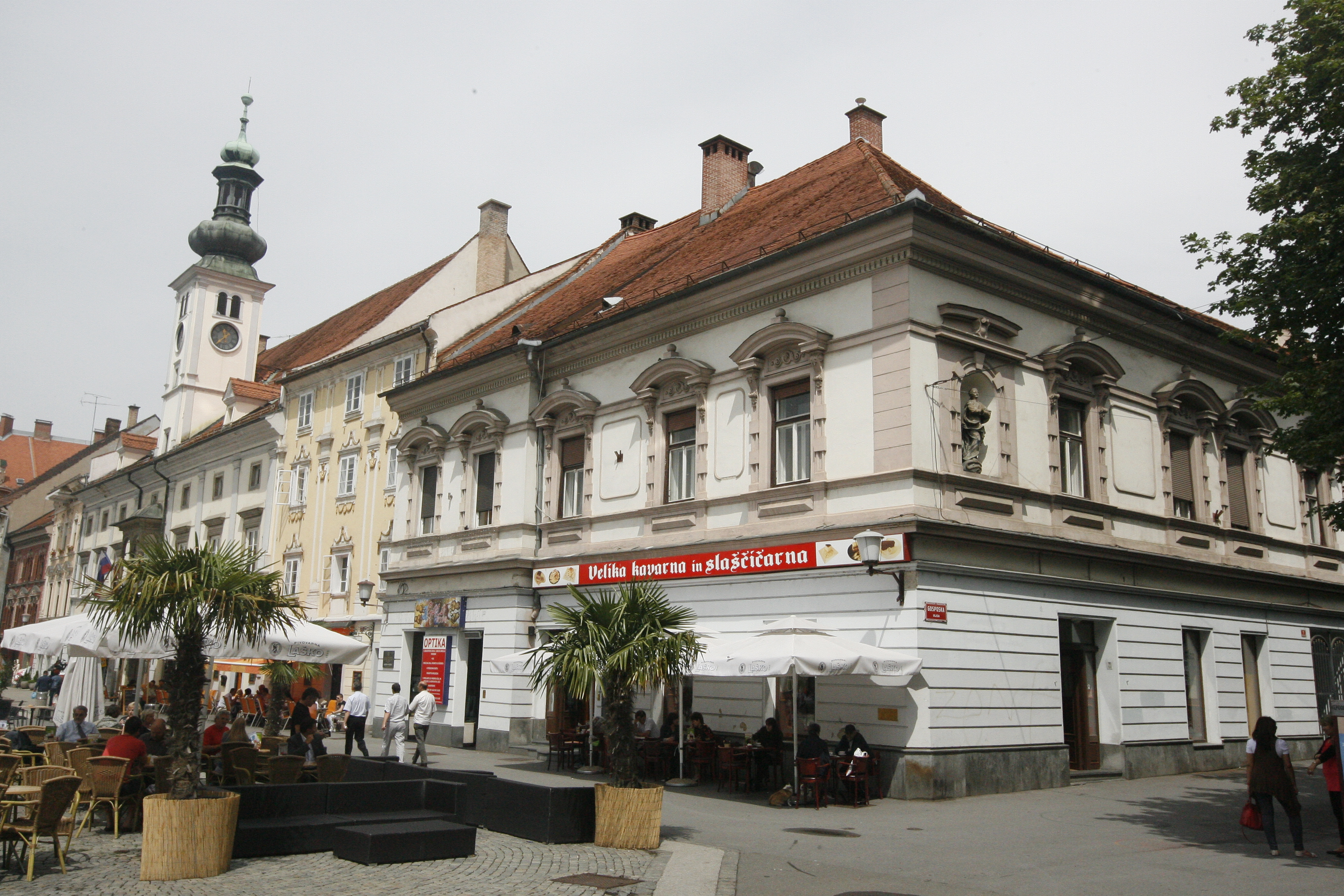
Former campus of Alma Mater Europaea – Evropski center, Maribor in Slovenia. Behind is the old Maribor city hall.

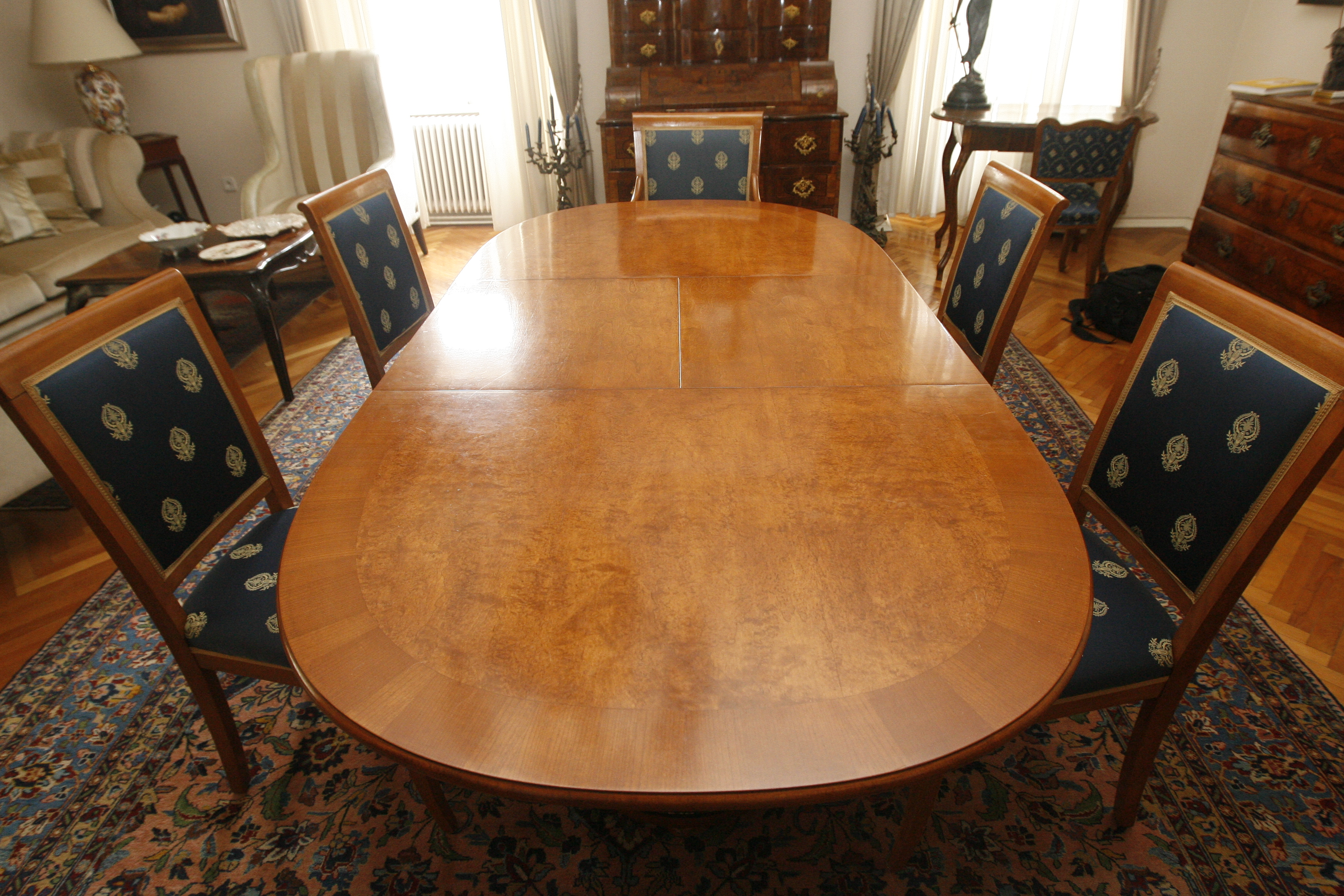
The Old Meeting Room at the Alma Mater in Maribor

The university has premises in Salzburg, Vienna, Ljubljana, Maribor, Capodistria, Murska Sobota and Toscana, Italy. While administration and offices are mainly in Salzburg and Maribor, lecturing takes place mainly in Ljubljana, Capodistria and Murska Sobota. Lecturing in Salzburg and some other European cities started in 2014.

- Department of Physical Therapy
- Department of Nursing
- Department of Social Gerontology
- Department of Management and European Studies
- Department of Archival and Documentology Studies

== Alma Mater Europaea, campus Vienna ==
In May 2024, Alma Mater opened its campus in Austria. Under the name Alma Mater Europaea, campus Vienna, shorter Alma Mater Vienna, it started Bachelor studies in Physiotherapy and PhD in Applied Artificial Intelligence. It announced campuses in Klagenfurt and Salzburg. Dr. Maximilian-Niklas Bonk is the Academic Dean of the Wien campus. The campus will offer other bachelor, masters and doctoral degrees.

The Alma Mater Europaea University, Vienna, hosts Alma Mater AI Center, and several initiatives and projects including TheConf.org and ifg.at. TheConf.org is an academic conference report platform, and ifg.at is a project on Austrian freedom of information.

== Programmes ==
- European leadership program, producing future European thinkers; the studies focus in European leadership, culture, political sciences, law, and human rights.
- European business studies, producing future European business leaders; This European MBA program would focus on political leadership and strategies, European identity and political culture, transformation and development of Europe, social reforms, sustainable development, globalization.

== It's About People conference ==
It's About People is an annual week-long multidisciplinary conference organized by the European Academy of Sciences and Arts and the Alma Mater Europaea university.

The president of Slovenia has traditionally bestowed the honorary patronage over the event. The conference was opened by the former president Borut Pahor between 2018 and 2022, and in 2023, by president Nataša Pirc Musar. The European Commission vice presidents Maroš Šefčovič and Dubravka Šuica and the European Commissioner Mariya Gabriel have addressed the conference. The eleventh conference, held in 2023, featured over 300 presenters from 30 countries in 80 panels.

== See also ==
- Academia Europaea
- College of Europe
- Global Center for Advanced Studies
- European Academy of Sciences and Arts
