= Mostje, Juršinci =

Mostje
- Location in Slovenia
- Coordinates: 46°27′26.88″N 15°57′19.11″E
- Country: Slovenia
- Traditional region: Styria
- Statistical region: Drava
- Municipality: Juršinci

Area
  - Total: 4.38 km^{2} (1.69 sq mi)
- Elevation: 219.2 m (719 ft)

Population (2002)
  - Total: 37

Mostje (pronounced [mɔˈstjɛ]) is a small settlement in the Municipality of Juršinci in northeastern Slovenia. It lies on the left bank of the Pesnica River north of Dornava on the edge of the Slovene Hills (Slovene: Slovenske gorice). The area is part of the traditional region of Styria. It is now included with the rest of the municipality in the Drava Statistical Region.

A small chapel-shrine in the settlement is dedicated to Saint John of Nepomuk and was built in the late 18th to early 19th century.
