= Juršinci =

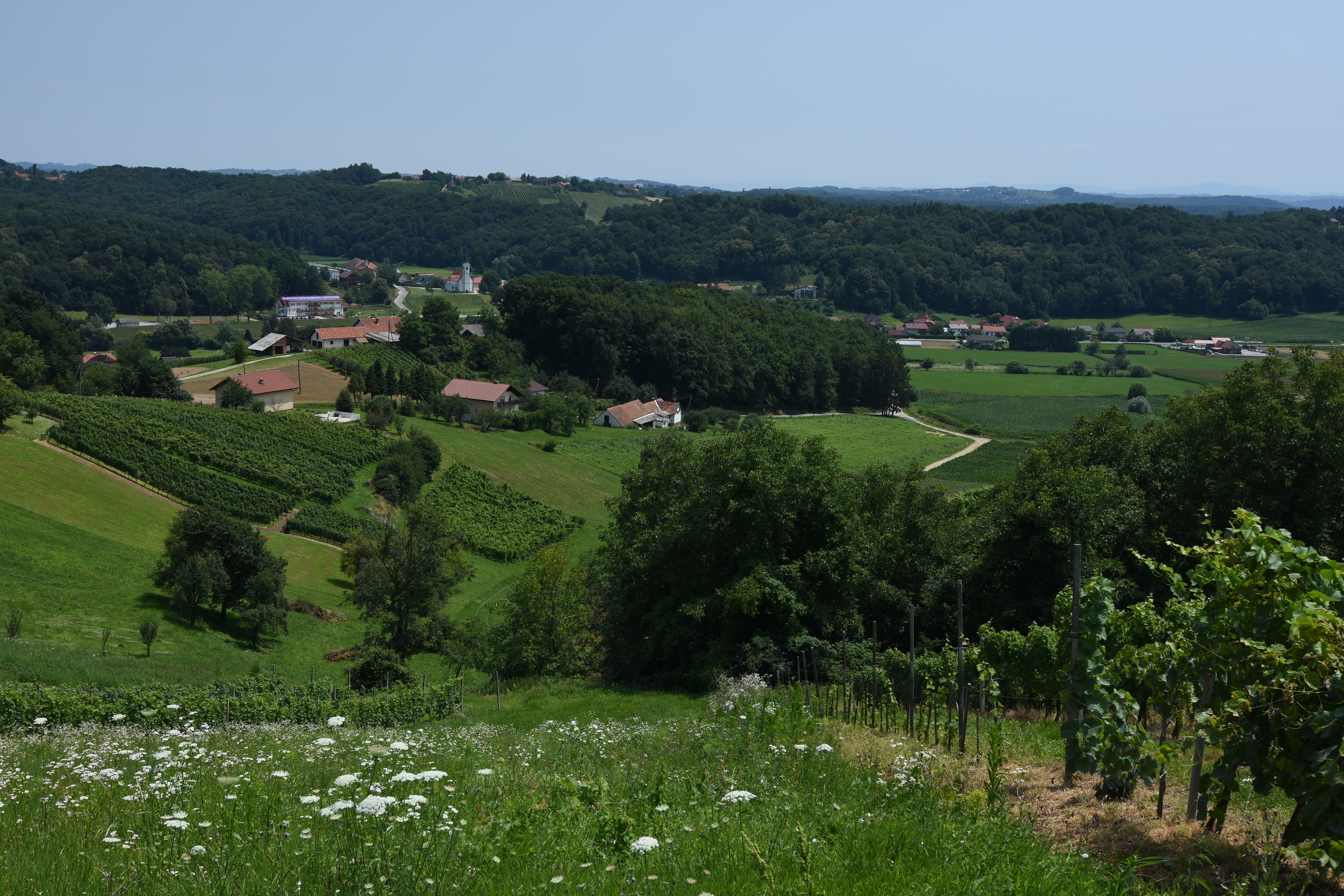

- Location in Slovenia
- Coordinates: 46°29′7.13″N 15°58′15.73″E
- Country: Slovenia
- Traditional region: Styria
- Statistical region: Drava
- Municipality: Juršinci

Area
  - Total: 2.99 km^{2} (1.15 sq mi)
- Elevation: 237.1 m (778 ft)

Population (2019)
  - Total: 381

Juršinci (pronounced [ˈjuːɾʃintsi], German: Jurschinzen) is a settlement in northeastern Slovenia. It is the seat of the Municipality of Juršinci. It lies in the Slovene Hills (Slovene: Slovenske gorice). The area is part of the traditional region of Lower Styria. The municipality is now included in the Drava Statistical Region.

Juršinci in its German form Georgendorf was first mentioned in official documents dating to 1322, and the Slovene name of the settlement, Juršinci, is documented as far back as 1409.

The parish church in the settlement is dedicated to Saint Lawrence and belongs to the Roman Catholic Archdiocese of Maribor. The original Gothic part of the building dates to the 14th century, but the church was remodelled in the first half of the 16th century.
