= Felix Unger =

Austrian cardiac surgeon

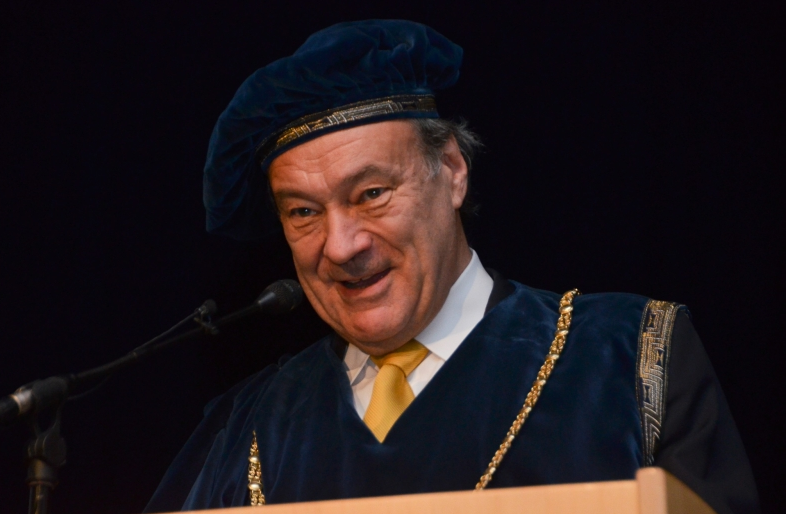
Unger, speaking at the Alma Mater Europaea graduation ceremony 12 March 2013

Felix Unger (born 2 March 1946) is a heart specialist who served as the president of the European Academy of Sciences and Arts for three decades. He is the president of Alma Mater Europaea. In 1986, he performed Europe's first staged artificial heart transplantation - a temporary solution used until a natural donor heart becomes available. Europe's first total artificial heart transplant was led by Bjarne Semb in 1985.

== Life ==
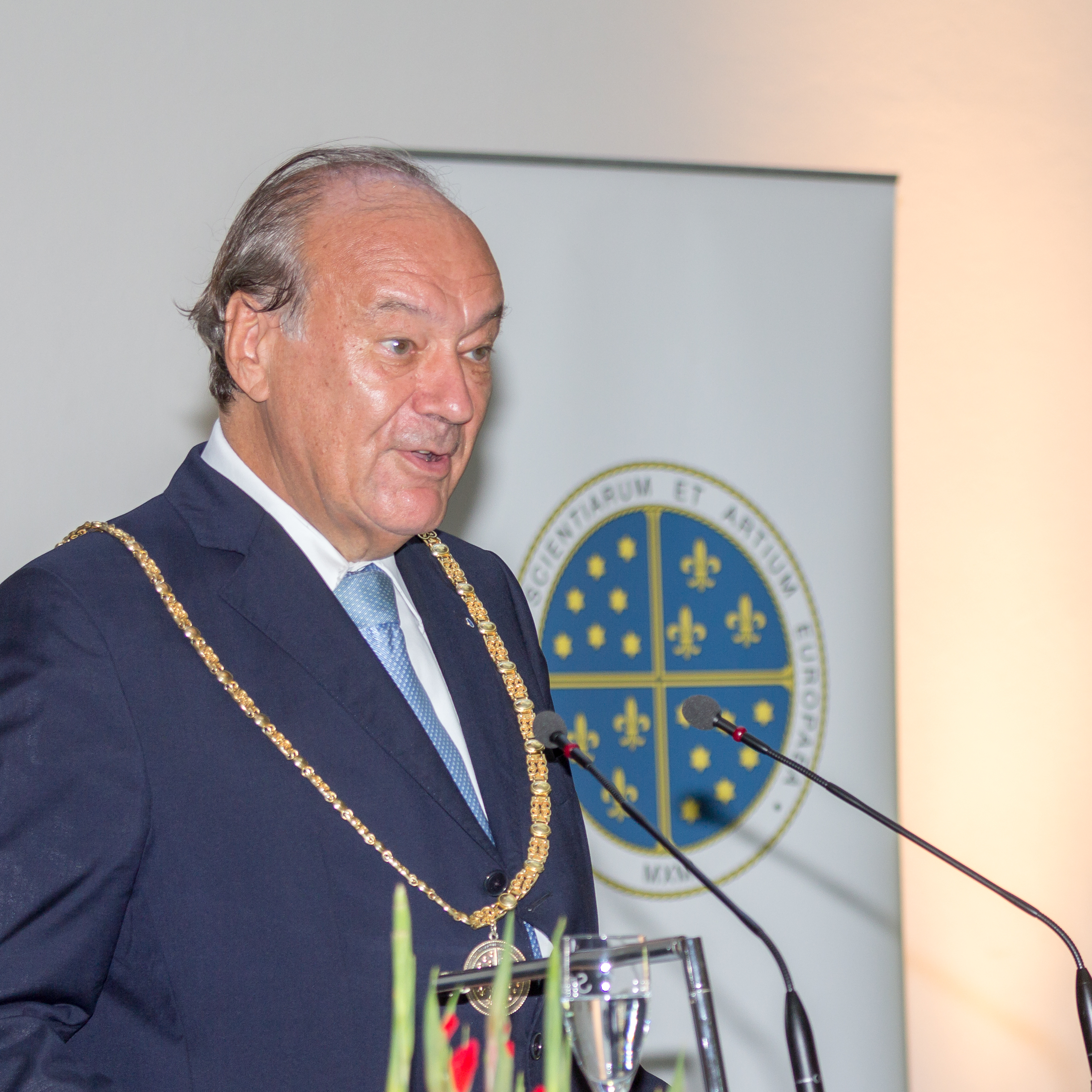
Felix Unger, 2015.

Unger was born in Klagenfurt, Austria. He studied medicine at University of Vienna, graduating in 1971. After graduation, he practiced at University Clinic for Cardiology in Vienna (1971, 1972) and at the local University Surgical Clinic (1972–1977) and in 1975 as a researcher in the field of Cardiovascular medicine in Houston, Cleveland and Salt Lake City in USA. In the year of 1978, he received his Ph.D, became Associate Professor (and later Full Surgical Professor). In Salt Lake City, he invented Ellipsoidheart, later used by Unger for his 1986 artificial heart transplant procedure. In 1990 he founded the European Academy of Sciences and Arts, together with Kardinal König and Professor Lobkowicz. From 1985 to 2011 he was the leader of the University Clinic for cardiac surgery in Salzburg. From 2001, he has been the president of the European Institute of Health. Prof. Unger is a member of a number of academies of science: a corresponding member of the Academy of Sciences and Arts of the German Federal State of North Rhine-Westphalia, Latvia, Slovenia and Serbia; a regular member of the German Leopoldina, Slovakia and the New York Academy of Sciences; and the world and the Montenegrin Academy of Sciences and Arts.

== Awards ==
- 1975 Dr. Preis Karl Renner,
- 1980 Sandoz Preis,
- 1980 German Society of Surgery,
- 1982 and 1989, Planseepreis für Wissenschaft,
- 1991 Purkyne Medaille (Brno),
- 1992 Billroth Preis der Österr. Ges. F. Chirurgie,
- 1992 Humes Professorship,
- 1992 Karylins Medaille,
- 1992 Bundesverdienstkreuz first class
- 2005 Verdienstkreuz des Landes Salzburg,
- 2006 Austrian Decoration for Science and Art first class
- 2009 Paul Stradins Preis, Riga
- 2011 Medal of the President of the Slovak Republic
- 2012 Großes Silbernes Ehrenzeichen für Verdienste um die Republik Österreich

Honorary professor:

- 2002 in Marburg
- 2012 in St. Petersburg

Honorary doctorates:

- 1994 in Budapest, Timișoara and Tokyo,
- 2003 in Riga
- 2007 in Belgrade
- 2009 in Athens
- 2010 in Tbilisi.
- 2012 in St. Petersburg
- 2013 in Arad and Cluj-Napoca
- 2014 in Tirana
- 2016 in Samara
