= List of members of the European Academy of Sciences and Arts =

The European Academy of Sciences and Arts (EASA, Latin: Academia Scientiarum et Artium Europaea) is a transnational and interdisciplinary network, connecting about 2,000 recommended scientists and artists worldwide, including 38 Nobel Prize laureates. The European Academy of Sciences and Arts is a learned society of scientists and artists, founded by Felix Unger. The academy was founded 1990, is situated in Salzburg and has been supported by the city of Vienna, the government of Austria, and the European Commission. The EASA is now headed by President Klaus Mainzer, TUM Emeritus of Excellence at the Technical University of Munich and Senior Professor at the Carl Friedrich von Weizsäcker Center of the University of Tübingen. Below is a list of members of the European Academy of Sciences and Arts (MEASA).

== I – Humanities ==
- Rüdiger Ahrens
- Sadik J. Al-Azam
- Mohammad Adnan Al-Bakhit
- Karl-Otto Apel
- Katherine Arens
- George Demetrius Babiniotis
- Arnulf Baring
- Wladyslaw Bartoszewski
- Heinrich Rudolf Beck
- Gerhold Becker
- Siegfried Beer
- Ludvík Belcredi
- Eloy Benito Ruano
- Theodor Berchem
- Wolfgang Bergsdorf
- France Bernik
- Alain Besançon
- Belisario Betancur
- Gunter Bischof
- Dieter Bingen
- Tzotcho Boiadjiev
- Damir Boras
- Pierre Bourdieu
- John Brademas
- David Anthony Brading
- Rémi Brague
- Jan Broegger
- Ruediger Bubner
- Ranko Bugarski
- Hubert Burda
- Rocco Buttiglione
- Paulino Castańeda Delgado
- Andris Caune
- Juan Luis Cebrián
- Guillermo Céspedes del Castillo
- William Charlesworth
- Young-Do Chung
- Erik Dal
- Georg Daltrop
- Robert von Dassanowsky
- Norman Davies
- José V. de Pina Martins
- Gilda L. de Romero Brest
- Angelos Delivorrias
- Peter Demetz
- Daniel C. Dennett
- Hichem Djait
- Mihailo Đurić
- Peter Dostál-Berg
- Jude P. Dougherty
- Michael A.E. Dummett
- Peter Ehlen S.J.
- Ulrich Engelhardt
- H. Tristram Engelhardt Jr.
- Fernando Feliu-Moggi
- Florens Felten
- John R. Fisher
- Christoph Luitpold Frommel
- Maximilian Fussl
- José Luis García Garrido
- Timothy Garton Ash
- Erich E. Geißler
- Alfredo Manuel van Gelderen
- Ferenc Glatz
- André Glucksmann
- Helmut Gneuss
- Rudolf Gönner
- Vartan Gregorian
- Norbert Greiner
- Jean Greisch
- Pascal Griener
- Pierre Gros
- Slobodan Grubačić
- Jirí Gruša
- Stanisław Grygiel
- Adolf Haslinger
- Klaus Hildebrand
- Günther Hödl
- Jean-Claude Pressac
- Tamás Hoffmann
- Adrian Holderegger
- Tonio Hölscher
- Jerzy Holzer
- Ludger Honnefelder
- Jochen Hörisch
- Barthel Hrouda
- Hiromasa Ikeda
- Rexhep Ismajli
- Peter Kampits
- Ryszard Kapuściński
- Asa Kasher
- Josef Klein
- Wolfgang Kluxen
- Leszek Kołakowski
- Paul König
- Evangelos Konstantinou
- Zoran Konstantinović
- Peter Koslowski
- Arvo Krikmann
- Saul A. Kripke
- Jósef Kriston Vízi
- Thomas S. Kuhn
- Maija Kūle
- Heinrich Kunstmann
- Johannes Laube
- Klaus-Dieter Lehmann
- Carl Edwin Lindgren
- Alejandro Llano Cifuentes
- Nikolaus Lobkowicz
- Hermann Lübbe
- Karl Majcen
- Károly Manherz
- Wolfgang Mastnak
- Margarita Mathiopoulos
- Federico Mayor Zaragoza
- Dejan Medaković
- Dieter R. Mertens
- Jon D. Miller
- Edgar Morscher
- Ingrid Moser
- Manfred Moser
- Evanghelos A. Moutsopoulos
- André de Muralt
- Thomas Nagel
- Virgil Nemoianu
- Julian Nida-Rümelin
- Heinrich Olschowsky
- Janez Orešnik
- Henning Ottmann
- Amos Oz
- Rolandas Pavilionis
- Manfred Peters
- Horst Pietschmann
- Hans Pohl
- Attila Pók
- Günther Pöltner
- Damjan Prelovšek
- Hilary W. Putnam
- Helmut Reinalter
- Helmut Renöckl
- Roland Ris
- Wolfgang Röd
- Jorge Alfredo Roetti
- Dietmar Rothermund
- Robert Royal
- A.J.R. Russell-Wood
- Yannis Sakellarakis
- Pello Salaburu Etxeberria
- Hans Saner
- Hans-Martin Sass
- Richard Schaeffler
- Hartmut Schiedermair
- Karl Schlögel
- Heinrich Schmidinger
- Wolfdietrich Schmied
- Kenneth L. Schmitz
- Hans-Peter Schreiber
- Roger Scruton
- John R. Searle
- Josef Seifert
- Wilfried Seipel
- Michel Serres
- Gershon Shaked
- Marek Jan Siemek
- Beat Sitter-Liver
- Peter Sloterdijk
- Otto Speck
- Sandro Spinsanti
- Jörg Splett
- Brigitte Maria Studer
- Darko Tanasković
- Nikola Tasić
- Petros G. Themelis
- Gregor Thuswaldner
- Michalis Tiverios
- Boštjan Marko Turk
- Boško Tomašević
- Juan Manuel Torres
- Gilbert Trausche
- Peeter Tulviste
- Jaan Undusk
- Gianni Vattimo
- Wilhelm Vossenkuhl
- Rainer Warning
- Werner Weidenfeld
- Stanislaw Wielgus
- Michael Wolffsohn
- Zvi Yavetz
- Zoran Žiletić
- Clemens Zintzen
- Józef Życiński
- Shams Anwari-Alhosseyni
- Reiner Wiehl

== II – Medicine ==
- Kalle Achté
- Dieter Adam
- Franz Adlkofer
- Stefan Angielski
- Zoran-Marij Arneš
- György Bagdy
- E. Andrew Balas
- Francesco Balsano
- Étienne-Émile Baulieu
- Matthias Beck
- Klaus Bergdolt
- Herman Van Den Berghe
- Peter Berner
- Ernst Bodner
- Elek Bodor
- Elzbieta Borowiecka
- Thomas Brandt
- Günter Breithardt
- Leslie Brent
- Eduardo Domingo Bruera
- Stefan Brunnhuber
- Marie Annick Buendia
- Miguel Caínzos Fernández
- Rivka Carmi
- Robert Charles Cefalo
- Shuk Han Cheng
- Aleksander G. Čučalin
- David Clark
- Dennis V. Cokkinos
- Antonio R. Damasio
- Andries van Dantzig
- Otto E. Dapunt
- José de Carvalho Barrias
- Rudolf de Châtel
- Ruth Deech
- Geza Deutsch
- Manfred Deutsch
- Hans Erich Diemath
- Hans Armin Dieterich
- Vinko Dolenc
- Ştefan Iosif Drǎgulescu
- Hipólito Durán Sacristán
- Victor J. Dzau
- Georgi Efremov
- Karsten Engelbrecht
- Dietrich von Engelhardt
- Philippe Evrard
- András Ézsiás
- Bengt Fagrell
- Youssef Fares
- Gerald D. Fischbach
- Tamás F. Freund
- Alexander von Gabain
- Pedro García Barreno
- William W. George
- Gerhard Giebisch
- Helmut Dietmar Glogar
- Juan José Goiriena de Gandarias y de Gandarias
- Santiago Grisolía
- Markus Haass
- Dieter Albert Häberle
- Juergen Hahn
- József Hámori
- John Collins Harvey
- Fengsheng He
- Hermann Hepp
- Roland Hetzer
- Franz-Christoph Himmler
- Hartmann Hinterhuber
- Ferdinand Hofstädter
- Cyril Höschl
- Johannes Huber
- Paul G. Hugenholtz
- Ralf Huss
- Peter Husslein
- Helena Illnerová
- Marcos Intaglietta
- Ivan Jelić
- Ain-Elmar Kaasik
- Thomas Kenner
- Hermes Andreas Kick
- Elemér J. Kontor
- Maria Kopp
- Reiner Körfer
- Božo Kralj
- Rolf Krebs
- Georg W. Kreutzberg
- Asim Kurjak
- Alfons Labisch
- Alfred Lamesch
- Walter G. Land
- Torvard C. Laurent
- Otto Michel Lesch
- Branislav Lichardus
- Daniel Loisance
- Berndt Lüderitz
- Ladislav Macho
- Barbara Maier
- Giovanni Maio
- Leonidas Manolidis
- Árpád Mayer
- William A. Meier-Ruge
- Christian Menzel
- Konrad Meßmer
- Emil Monos
- Luc Montagnier
- Hubert Mörl
- Attila Nemes
- Ernst Niedermeyer
- Marshall Nirenberg
- Dmitrij Orlov
- Gernot Pauser
- Isidore Pelc
- Klaus Peter
- Hellmuth Petsche
- Werner Platzer
- Flavio Poldrugo
- Peter Polterauer
- Alain Pompidou
- Milan Popović
- Konstantino Praškevičius Antanas
- Volker Pudel
- Reinhard Putz
- Günter Rager
- Sotirios Raptis
- Britta Reichardt
- Robert S. Reneman
- Miklós Réthelyi
- Harald Reuter
- Ottó Ribári
- Silvano Riva
- Krešimir Rotim
- Francisco José Rubia
- Wilhelm Rutishauser
- Vladimir O. Samoilov
- Friedrich Sandhofer
- Florentino A. Sanguinetti
- Hans Schadewaldt
- Alexander Schirger
- Francisc A. Schneider
- Heinz Schott
- Peter Schwandt
- José María Segovia de Arana
- Michael Sela
- Dennis J. Selkoe
- Daniel Serrăo
- Patrick W. Serruys
- Harold T. Shapiro
- Carla J. Shatz
- Kenneth I. Shine
- Ulrich Sigwart
- Maarten Laurens Simoons
- Wolf Singer
- Ján Slezák
- Péter Sótonyi
- Wolfgang Spann
- Jonathan Stone
- Toomas-Andres Sulling
- Susanne Suter
- Wilhelm Thal
- Werner Theisinger
- Pavel Traubner
- Hans Troidl
- Jože V. Trontelj
- Gary Tse
- Viliam Ujházy
- Felix Unger
- Rafael Vara Thorbeck
- Jānis Vētra
- Sylvester E. Vizi
- Janis Volkolakovs
- Vladimír Vonka
- Hans-Martin Weinmann
- Egon Wetzels
- Hanns P. Wolff
- Karlheinz Wurster
- Rudolf Zahradník
- Josef Zander
- Semir M. Zeki
- Nancy S. Wexler

== III – Arts ==
- Klaus Ager
- Rudolf Angermüller
- Jüri Arrak
- László Baán
- Árpád Balázs
- Agnes Baltsa
- Günther G. Bauer
- Peter Baum
- László Beke
- Vladimir Belousov
- Luciano Berio
- Janez Bernik
- Gottfried Boehm
- Walter Boeykens
- Klaus Bollinger
- Pierre Boulez
- Friedrich Brandstätter
- Alfred Brendel
- Jeton Kelmendi
- Janet Brooks Gerloff
- Dario Cebic
- Friedrich Cerha
- Ghenadie Ciobanu
- Dana Ciocarlie
- Sidney Corbett
- Tony Cragg
- Monika Czernin
- János Czifra
- Mario del Chiaro
- Maria Luisa Dalla Chiara
- Aurelian Danila
- Demosthenes Davvetas
- Richard Deacon
- Antonio Dias
- Jef Diels
- Violeta Dinescu
- Milutin Djurickovic
- Anne do Paço
- Eugen Doga
- Giovanna Dongu
- Srečko Dragan
- Bernd Dürr
- Marios Joannou Elia
- Adrian Eröd
- Valie Export
- Árpád Fasang Mlajši
- Stanisław Fijałkowski
- Monika von Fioreschy
- Frank O. Gehry
- Carmen Giménez
- Theodor Göllner
- Jani Golob
- Ramón González de Amezúa
- Gábor Görgey
- Vittorio Gregotti
- Cristóbal Halffter
- Thomas Hampson
- Nikolaus Harnoncourt
- Hilmar Hoffmann
- Hans Hollein
- Jenny Holzer
- Eberhard Horst
- Rudolf Hradil
- Jörg Immendorff
- Helmut Jahn
- Drago Jančar
- Pavel Jiras
- György Jovánovics
- Ilya Kabakov
- Hartwig Kelm
- Katalin Keserü
- Joseph Kohnen
- Otto Kolleritsch
- György Kornis
- Łukasz Korolkiewicz
- Oliver Korte
- Manfred Kovatsch
- Herbert E. Kramel
- Petr Kratočvíl
- Josef Krawina
- Uroš Krek
- Thomas Krens
- András Kürthy
- Paul Konrad Kurz
- Horst Laubenthal
- Jacques Leenhardt
- György Sándor Ligeti
- Norman Robert Lord Foster
- Laurenz Lütteken
- Lorin Maazel
- István Madarassy
- Mateja Matevski
- Emil Maurer
- Waltraud Magdalena Meier
- Jiří Menzel
- Klaus Mertens
- Gérard Mortier
- Alexander Müllenbach
- Marko Mušič
- Juan Navarro Baldeweg
- Hermann Nitsch
- Erwin Ortner
- Mimmo Paladino
- Gustav Peichl
- Krzysztof Penderecki
- Dominique Perrault
- Renzo Piano
- Rudolf Preimesberger
- Wolf D. Prix
- Carl Pruscha
- Nika Radić
- Hans Raimund
- Arnulf Rainer
- Wolfgang Rihm
- Dieter Ronte
- Norman Rosenthal
- Manfred Sack
- András Schiff
- Wieland Schmied
- Charlotte Seither
- Rudolf Seitz
- Eduard F. Sekler
- Richard Serra
- Adriena Šimotová
- Beatrix Sitter-Liver
- Aleksej K. Solovijev
- Werner Spies
- Jürg Stenzl
- Vladimir Suchánek
- Helmut Swiczinsky
- Magda Szabó
- Livia Teodorescu-Ciocănea
- Christian Thielemann
- KevinThompson
- Horst Thürheimer
- Michael Tsalka
- Zurab Tsereteli
- Bernar Venet
- Robert Venturi
- Andrew Visnevski
- Manfred Wagner
- Josef Wallnig
- Martin Walser
- Jacek Walto
- Gerhard Weinberger
- Peter Weiser
- Franz Welser
- Leo Witoszynskyj
- Paul Zanker
- Eberhard Heinrich Zeidler
- Udo Zimmermann
- Ciril Zlobec
- Ludwig Tavernier
- Isang Yun
- Carl Van de Velde

== IV – Natural sciences ==
- Marek Abramowicz
- Joan Albaigés i Riera
- Bruce Alberts
- Adriano Alippi
- Rainer Ansorge
- Ioan M. Anton
- Luís Archer
- Aurel M. Ardelean, Arad
- Francisco Ayala y García-Duarte
- Alexandru T. Balaban
- Hans Balsiger
- Eszter Bánffy
- Francisco J. Barrantes
- Nikolaj Genadijevič Basov
- Bruno Battaglia
- Lothar Beckel
- Peter Berthold, Radolfzell
- Jiří Bičák
- Gerd K. Binnig
- Yehudith Birk, Rehovot
- Tomáž Bleha
- Robert Blinc
- Elmars Blums
- Giovanni Bombace
- Jean Bonnin
- Gernot Born
- Luciano Brigo
- Yvan Bruynseraede
- Peter Buckel
- Lev Bukovský
- Roland Zdenek Bulirsch
- Sergio Carrŕ
- Carlo Castagnoli
- Massimo Cerdonio
- Alexander Cernusca
- Stuart W. Charles, Gwynedd
- Ilan Chet, Rehovot
- Aaron J. Ciechanover
- Heinz Gert de Couet
- Vilmos Csányi
- Hans Günter Danielmeyer
- Riccardo de Bernardi
- Juan de Dios Vial Correa
- Robert J. Delmas
- Aleksandar Despić
- Jozef Devreese
- Fernando Roldāo Dias Agudo
- Jiří Drahoš
- Matija Drovenik
- Petr Duchek
- Jack David Dunitz
- Dieter H. Ehhalt
- Paul R. Ehrlich
- Irenäus Eibl-Eibesfeldt
- Jüri Engelbrecht
- Heinz Engl
- Hans-Jörg Fecht
- Antal Festetics
- Hans Fricke
- Ivan Gams
- Kajetan Gantar
- Paul Germain
- Giovanni Giudice
- Peter A. Glasow
- Matija Gogala
- Jane Goodall
- Erich Gornik
- Ioan Gottlieb
- Niki Goulandris
- Hartmut Graßl
- Shlomo Grossman
- Siegfried Grossmann
- Aleksej Gvišiani
- Klaus Habetha
- Hermann Haken
- Klaus Ferdinand Hasselmann
- Ulrich Heinzmann
- Jiří Holenda
- Léo Houziaux
- Milan Hronec
- Robert Huber
- Yoseph Imry
- Gerhard Isenberg
- Vladimir Ivanov-Omskij
- Lothar Jaenicke
- Rudolf Janoschek
- Zdenek Johan
- Ola M. Johannessen
- Benediktas Juodka
- Till Uwe Keil
- Ivars Knets
- Dietmar Knoppik
- Teuvo Kohonen
- Kurt Ludwig Komarek
- Rihards Kondratovičs
- Kiril Ja. Kondratjev
- Nikolaj Kristoffel
- Norbert Kroó
- David Devraj Kumar
- Otto L. Lange
- Andrzej B. Legocki
- Vladilen Letokov
- Péter Lévai
- Jānis Lielpēters
- Arthur Liener
- Cayetano López Martínez
- Štefan Luby
- Armando Luches
- Jože Maček
- Luciano Maiani
- Eva Majkova
- Guri I. Marčuk
- Ivo Marek
- Milan Mareč
- Yoel Margalith
- Vojislav Marić
- Koichiro Matsuno
- Lyda Matysova-Rychlá
- Ernest Mayer
- Aleksander G. Meržanov
- Volker ter Meulen
- Heinz Miller
- Urve Miller
- Ilja I. Moisejev
- Henk J. van der Molen
- Mohamed Yousry Morsy
- Jan Mozrzymas
- Achim Müller
- Emilio Muñoz Ruiz
- Ernst Mutschler
- József Nagy
- Oleg M. Nefedov
- Erwin Neher
- Reinhard Nießner
- Jan Simon Nilsson
- Heinrich Nöth
- Mario Rosario Occorsio
- Stefan Odenbach
- Dieter Oesterhelt
- Eve Oja
- Stanisław Olszewski
- Johannes Ortner
- Jurij Osipov
- József Pálinkás
- Václav Pačes
- Benno Parthier
- Marius Sabin Peculea
- Johann Peisl
- Heinz-Otto Peitgen
- Matjaž Perc
- Juan Pérez Mercader
- Jörg Pfleiderer
- Mario Piattelli
- Krunoslav Pisk
- Juras Požela
- Manfred Precht
- Frank Press
- Tomaž Prosen
- Roland Psenner
- Ernö Pungor
- Gisbert zu Putlitz
- Hans Puxbaum
- Karl Rebane
- Ernie Reese
- Dušan Repovš
- Klaus Ring
- Stefan Kirov Robev
- Herbert W. Roesky
- Margarita Salas
- José Manuel Sánchez Ron
- Maria B. Sass
- Niceas Schamp
- Theodor Schmidt
- Herwig Schopper
- Erich Schroll
- Oskar Schulz
- Peter Schuster
- František Sehnal, České Budějovice
- Reinhard Selten
- Hans-Christoph Siegmann
- Theodore E. Simos
- Ivo Člaus
- Uwe B. Sleytr
- David A. Spencer
- Heinz A. Staab
- Branko Stanovic
- Ioan Ştefǎnescu
- Wulf Steinmann
- Klaus Stierstadt
- Hans-Bernd Strack
- Jānis Stradiņs
- Georg Süßmann
- Reiner Sustmann
- Péter Szalay (chemist)
- Walter Thiel
- Toomas Tiivel
- Jozef Tiňo
- Miha Tišler
- Joachim Trümper
- Werner Tufar
- Dragica Turnšek
- Lucio Ubertini
- David John Vaughan
- Ladislau Vékás
- Zdeněk Veselovský
- Raúl Villar Lázaro
- František Volf
- Leonid Vorobjev
- Ernst Ulrich von Weizsäcker
- Julius Wess
- Meir Wilchek
- Günther Wilke
- Itamar Willner
- Bernhard Witkop
- Ada Yonath
- Péter Závodszky
- Anton Zeilinger
- Christos S. Zerefos
- Hubert Ziegler

== V – Social sciences, law and economics ==
- Kamel S. Abu Jaber
- Ludwig Adamovich Jr.
- Elmar Altvater
- Isidoro Alvarez
- Tibor Asbóth
- Marcel Bauer
- Sergio Belardinelli
- Steven Beller
- Miklós Bendzsel
- Peter Blaho
- Nada Bodiroga-Vukobrat
- Ksente Bogoev
- Karl Martin Bolte
- Katalin Botos
- Avishay Braverman
- Klaus Brockhoff
- Milan Buček
- Walther Busse von Colbe
- Claus-Wilhelm Canaris
- John-ren Chen
- Massimo Corsale
- Anne de Boismilon
- Ingrid Detter de Frankopan
- Angel de la Fuente Moreno
- Vladimir-Đuro Degan
- Salustiano del Campo Urbano
- Meinolf Dierkes
- Juan Díez Nicolás
- Ricardo Díez-Hochleitner Rodríguez
- Vlado Dimovski
- Rik Donckels
- Kurt Dopfer
- Yehezkel Dror
- Eberhard J.C. Duelfer
- Rudolf Eder
- Maria Anna Eder – Rieder
- Horst Eidenmüller
- Michel Falise
- Gilbert Fayl
- Ottokarl Finsterwalder
- Michael W. Fischer
- Eduardo Foncillas Casaús
- Georgi Fotev
- Joachim Frohn, Bielefeld
- Enrique Fuentes Quintana
- Bernd-Christian Funk
- Vicente Garrido Rebolledo
- José Manuel González-Páramo
- Andreas Goldschmidt
- Richard H. Grathoff
- Dieter Grosser
- Oskar Grün
- Orhan Güvenen
- Hans-Dieter Haas
- Peter Häberle
- Walther J. Habscheid
- Alois Hahn
- Hans Peter Haselsteiner
- Michael von Hauff
- Heinz Hauser
- Herbert Hax
- Anton Heini
- Andreas Heldrich
- Elhanan Helpman
- Johannes Hengstschläger
- Erich Hödl
- Peter Herrmann
- Waldemar Hummer
- Otmar Issing
- Bruce J. Janigian
- José Luis Joló Marín
- Walter Franz Kälin
- Ali L. Karaosmanoğlu
- Walter Karten
- Erich Kaufer
- Franz-Xaver Kaufmann
- Walter Kerber
- Karl Korinek
- Erich Kussbach
- Carlos Lámbarri Gómez
- Vanda Eva Lamm
- Klaus Landfried
- Juhani Laurinkari
- Alberto Luís Laplaine Fernandes Guimarães
- José Larrea Gayarre
- András László
- Franz Lehner
- Werner Leinfellner
- Klaus Michael Leisinger
- Bernard Lietaer
- Ruud F. M. Lubbers
- Constantinos Lyberopoulos
- Michel Maffesoli
- Fredmund Malik
- Hans-Jörgen Manstein
- Antonio Marquina
- Ricardo Martí Fluxá
- Carmela Martín González
- János Martonyi
- Andreu Mas-Colell
- Jean-Pierre Massué
- Herbert Matis
- Manfred A. Max-Neef
- Jože Mencinger
- Ernst-Joachim Mestmäcker
- John A. Michon
- Meinhard Miegel
- Liz Mohn
- Jesús Moneo Montoya
- Carlo Mongardini
- Ivo Mošný
- Matjaž Mulej
- Jiří Musil
- Peter Oberender
- Luan Omari
- Marcelino Oreja Aguirre
- Stjepan Orešković
- María Luisa Oyarzábal Fernández
- Péter Paczolay
- Eckart Pankoke
- Philippe van Parijs
- Riccardo Petrella
- Ernest Petrič
- J. Hanns Pichler
- José Luis Pinillos Díaz
- Jesús Polanco Gutiérrez
- Avelino Porto
- Danilo Požar
- Javier Quesada Ibáńez
- Dušan Radonjič
- Gerhard Randa, Vienna
- Jan Philipp Reemtsma
- Antonio Remiro Brotóns
- Alois Riklin
- Miquel Roca Junyent
- Günter H. Roth
- Ariel Rubinstein
- Dieter Sadowski
- José Ángel Sánchez Asiaín
- Claude Sauer
- Rudolf Schäfer
- Karsten Schmidt
- Ursula Schneider
- Rainer J. Schweizer
- Johann-Matthias Graf von der Schulenburg
- Zvonimir Paul Šeparović
- Eduardo Serra Rexach
- Moufid Shehab
- Horst Siebert
- Ivan Šimonović
- Günter Solbach
- Branislav Šoškić
- Ignacio Sotelo
- Klaus-Heinrich Standke
- Horst Steinmann
- Joseph Straus
- Erich W. Streissler
- Heinrich Stremitzer
- Brigitte Tag
- Jochen Taupitz
- Zoltán Tefner
- Jaime Terceiro Lomba
- Geiserich Eduard Tichy
- Klaus Töpfer
- Ludvik Toplak
- Gabriel Tortella Casares
- Otto Triffterer
- László Trócsányi
- Fritz Underberg
- Juanm Velarde Fuertes
- Willy Verstraete
- Frank Vibert
- Xavier Vives Torrents
- Menahem Yaari
- Paul Kirchhof
- Theodor Waigel
- Christian Watrin
- Arthur George Weidenfeld
- Andrzej Werner
- Georg Winckler
- Philippe de Woot
- Klaus von Wysocki
- Andrzej Zoll
- Michael Zöller
- Dejan Jović

== VI – Technical and environmental sciences ==
- Hillar Aben
- Mario Agabbio
- Marco Amabili
- Vito Amoia
- Anton Anton
- Takashi Asano
- Clemens Baack
- Maks Babuder
- Sanzio Baldini
- György Bálint
- Zdeněk P. Bažant
- Richárd Berend
- Wolfram Boeck
- Ion Boldea
- Kurt-Volker Boos
- Hellmuth Broda
- Josef Bugl
- Panayotis Gr. Carydis
- Peter Chen
- Ni-Bin Chang
- Virgiliu Niculae Constantinescu
- Francesco Giulio Crescimanno
- László Cser
- Árpád Csurgay
- Maurizio Cumo
- René de Borst
- Ákos Detreköi
- Hartmut Dieterich
- Valter Doleček
- Mihai Drǎgǎnescu
- Doina Drǎgulescu
- Panagiotis A. Drakatos
- Momir Đurović
- Hans-Peter Dürr
- Timi Ećimović
- Klaus Ehrlenspiel
- Lars G. Ekman
- Gerold Estermann
- Georg Färber
- Alfred Fettweis
- Günter B. L. Fettweis
- Ernst Fiala
- Giorgio Franceschetti
- Chlodwig Franz
- Arturo García Arroyo
- Emmanuel E. Gdoutos
- Michel Giot
- Géza Gordos
- Heinz H. Häberle, Herrsching
- Christoph Hackelsberger
- Jörn Hamann
- Geoffrey Frederick Hewitt
- Bruno Fritsch
- Nikola Hajdin
- Lubomír Holý, Mérida
- Dietmar von Hoyningen-Huene
- Franz Jeglitsch
- Aad Jongebreur
- Janusz Kacprzyk
- Jaan Kalda, Tallinn
- Charles K. Kao
- Joachim Klein
- Hermann Knoflacher
- Erich Kopp
- Helmut Kroiss
- Ulf Krückl
- István Láng
- Robert W. Lucky
- Walter Lukas
- Bernd Lupberger
- Silvano Maletto
- Herbert A. Mang
- Hans Marko
- Štefan Markuš
- Ezio Martuscelli
- James Massey
- Franz Mayinger
- Daniel Martín Mayorga
- Otto Meitinger
- Pál Michelberger
- Joachim Milberg
- Anthony Milburn
- Antonio Moccaldi
- Gino Moncada Lo Giudice
- Juan Mulet Meliá
- Tālis Millers
- Francesco Moriondo
- Ján Morovič
- Günter Müller
- Hans Georg Musmann
- Antonio Naviglio
- Heinz Neumann
- Maciej Nowicki
- Horst Ohnsorge
- Paolo Omenetto
- André Oosterlinck
- Johann-Christoph Ottow
- Franz Oswald
- Sankar Pal
- Fritz Paschke
- Lucjan Pawłowski
- György Pethes
- Günter Petzow
- Robert Piloty
- Marius-Ioan Piso
- Wolfango Plastino
- Hans Josef Rath
- Erich R. Reinhardt
- Ortwin Renn
- Andreas Rieger
- Heinz Riesenhuber
- Ares J. Rosakis
- Tamás Roska
- Karl Rudelstorfer
- Voicu Safta
- Helmut Schaefer
- Heinz Schmidtke
- Siegfried Selberherr
- Dan Shechtman
- Zhang Shen
- Ismail Serageldin
- Peter Skalicky
- Viktor Smieško
- Vladimir S. Soldatov
- Franc Solina
- László Somlyódy
- Günter Spur
- Gert Stadler
- Dong Sun
- Guido Tartara
- Juraj Tölgyessy
- Žiga Turk
- Uldis Viesturs
- Marcel H. Van de Voorde
- Alfred Voß
- Hans-Jürgen Warnecke
- Kevin Warwick
- Manfred Weck
- Raoul A. Weiler
- Peter A. Wilderer
- Steve Williamson
- Tomasz Winnicki
- Dietrich Wolf
- Heinz Zemanek
- Xin Zhang
- Jacob Ziv

== VII – World religions ==
- Joachim Angerer
- Mohammed Arkoun
- Heinrich Assel
- Ludwig Averkamp
- Georg Baudler
- Anselm Bilgri
- Eugen Biser
- Gerald J. Yaakov
- Michael Broch, Renningen
- Johannes Brosseder
- Siglind Bruhn
- Andreas Bsteh
- Horst Bürkle
- Hervé Carrier
- Godfried Cardinal Danneels
- Klaus Demmer
- Axel Denecke
- Ernst Ludwig Ehrlich
- Péter Cardinal Erdő
- Marko Feingold
- Johann Figl
- Michael Louis Fitzgerald
- Constantin Floros
- Edeltraud Forster
- Johann Friedrich
- Gebhard Fürst
- Aladár Gajáry
- Claude Geffré
- Alois Glück
- Georges Goedert
- Roland Goetschel
- Thomas Goppel
- Günter Gorschenek
- Norbert Goettler
- Gerd-Günther Grau
- Paul Grosz
- Gerhard Gruber
- Johannes Gründel
- Ferdinand Hahn
- Tomáš Halík
- Gotthold Hasenhüttl
- Manfred Heim
- Richard Heinzmann
- Georges Hellinghausen
- Ulrich Hemel
- Hermann Herder
- Herbert Hoffmann
- Walter Homolka
- Norbert W. Höslinger
- Walter Jacob
- Hans-Jochen Jaschke
- Philipp Jenninger
- Peter Jentzmik
- Klaus-Peter Jörns
- Karl K. Kaiser
- Philipp Kaiser
- Egon Kapellari
- Walter Cardinal Kasper
- Margot Käßmann
- Hans H. Kessler
- Adel Theodor Khoury
- Walter Kirchschläger
- Hans-Josef Klauck
- Elmar Klinger
- Wilfried Koch
- Franz Cardinal König
- Juraj Kolarić
- Pieter Sjoerd van Koningsveld
- Wilhelm Korff
- Edgar Josef Korherr
- Reinhard Körner
- Otto-Hubert Kost
- Alois Kothgasser
- Mieczysław Albert Krąpiec
- Jože Krašovec
- Wolf Krötke
- Elmar Kuhn
- Annelie Kümpers-Greve
- Hans Küng
- Karl-Josef Kuschel
- Peter Landesmann
- Michael Langer
- Gerhard Larcher
- Grigorios Larentzakis
- Armin Laschet
- Karl Cardinal Lehmann
- Hermann von Lips
- Susanne Mack
- Jamal Malik
- Bernhard Mayer
- Joachim Cardinal Meisner
- P. Friedhelm Mennekes
- Bernhard Meuser
- Arno Heinrich Meyer
- Hans Joachim Meyer
- Karl Miltner
- Walter Bischoff Mixa
- Gerhard Mockenhaupt
- Erwin Möde
- Ludwig Mödl
- Thomas Mooren
- Heinrich Mussinghoff
- Andreas Nachama
- Johannes Neuhardt
- Peter-Rupert Neuner
- Józef Niewiadomski
- Theodor Nikolaou
- Alfons Nossol
- Leo J. O' Donovan
- Stanislav Ojnik
- Hans Paarhammer
- Alexandros Papaderós
- Toomas Paul
- Silvano Cardinal Piovanelli
- Paul Cardinal Poupard
- Želimir Puljić
- Michel Quesnel
- Walter Raberger
- Alfred Raddatz
- Joseph Cardinal Ratzinger
- Johann Peter Rechenmacher
- Ferdinand Reisinger
- Günter Riße
- Franc Rode
- Iginio Rogger
- Hans Rotter
- Juan-Carlos Scannone
- Pater Johannes Schaber
- Richard Schenk
- Karl Schlemmer
- Hans-Ludwig Schmidt
- Peter Schmidt
- Georg Schmuttermayr
- Christoph Cardinal Schönborn
- Hubert Schöne
- Paul T. Schotsmans
- Florian Schuller
- Klaus Schultz
- Christian Schütz
- Georg Schwaiger
- Bruno Schwalbach
- Max Seckler
- Alojzij Slavko Snoj
- Franz X. Spengler
- Hermann Josef Spital
- Günter Stock
- Bertalan Tamás
- Evangelos Theodorou
- Werner Thissen
- Bassam Tibi
- Alojzij Uran
- Asztrik Várszegi
- Hans-Walter Vavrovsky
- Markus Vinzent
- Günter Virt
- Hermann-Josef Vogt
- Edmund Wagenhofer
- Hans Waldenfels
- Karl-Heinz Walkenhorst
- Ulrich Wank
- Justus Warburg
- Kurt Weis
- Manfred Weitlauff
- Gunther Wenz
- Friedrich Wetter
- Ruprecht Wimmer
- Notker Wolf
- Karl Matthäus Woschitz
- Mahmoud Hamdi Zakzouk
- Gregor Zasche
- Xinping Zhuo
- Ingo Zimmermann
- Paul Michael Zulehner
