= Gerhold K. Becker =

German philosopher (born 1943)

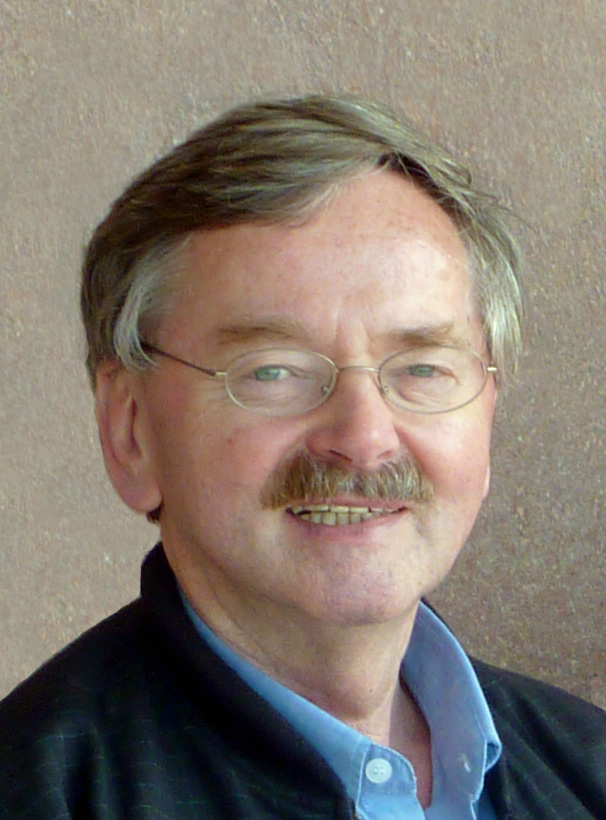
Gerhold K. Becker

Gerhold K. Becker (born 22 July 1943) is a German philosopher.

== Biographical sketch ==
Gerhold K. Becker grew up in Bad Salzschlirf, Hesse, the eldest son of the violinist Josef Becker and his wife Agnes née Goldbach. After graduating from the humanistic high school at Fulda, he studied philosophy and theology at universities in Frankfurt am Main, Heidelberg, and Munich, with, among others, Hans-Georg Gadamer, Dieter Henrich, Hermann Krings, Robert Spaemann, Michael Theunissen, Ernst Tugendhat and Heinrich Fries, Alois Grillmeier, Wolfhart Pannenberg, Karl Rahner, Trutz Rendtorff and Eugen Biser, under whose direction he completed a summa cum laude dissertation on the thinking of Ernst Troeltsch. In 1975-1986 he taught at LMU Munich's Institute for Christian World View and Philosophy of Religion. During this time he met his future wife, the musicologist and concert pianist Siglind Bruhn. In January 1986 he accepted a position at the Department of Religion and Philosophy of what is now Hong Kong Baptist University. In 1987, his wife joined him in Hong Kong, where she taught for six years at The University of Hong Kong. In 1991, Becker was asked to establish Hong Kong's first Centre for Applied Ethics and become its founding director; in 1992, he was elected as an Ordinary Member to the European Academy of Sciences and Arts. From 1996-2004, he served on the Hong Kong Government's Council on Human Reproductive Technology, initially as a member, then as the chairman of its Ethics Committee. Since 2004 he is a regular visiting professor at the Graduate School of Philosophy and Religion, Assumption University of Thailand, Bangkok.

== Positions ==
- 1975–1980 Lecturer (Wissenschaftlicher Assistent), Institute of Philosophy (Institut für Christliche Weltanschauung und Religionsphilosophie), LMU Munich
- 1980–1986 Assistant Professor [Akademischer Rat], Institute of Philosophy (Institut für Christliche Weltanschauung und Religionsphilosophie), LMU Munich
- 1986–1988 Senior Lecturer, Department of Religion and Philosophy, Hong Kong Baptist College
- 1988–1991 Principal Lecturer, Department of Religion and Philosophy, Hong Kong Baptist College
- 1991–2000 Director, Centre for Applied Ethics, Hong Kong Baptist College (as of January 1994: Hong Kong Baptist University)
- 1991–1995 Professor, Personal Chair of Religion and Philosophy, Hong Kong Baptist College [as of January 1994: Hong Kong Baptist University]
- 1995–2004 Chair Professor of Religion and Philosophy, Hong Kong Baptist University
- 2004–present Regular Visiting Professor, Graduate School of Philosophy and Religion, Assumption University of Thailand, Bangkok

== Publications ==
=== Books (selection) ===
- Theologie in der Gegenwart. Tendenzen und Perspektiven, Pustet, 1978. ISBN 3-7917-0557-1.
- Neuzeitliche Subjektivität und Religiosität. Die religionsphilosophische Bedeutung von Heraufkunft und Wesen der Neuzeit im Denken Ernst Troeltschs, Pustet, 1982. ISBN

3-7917-0734-5.

- Die Ursymbole in den Religionen, Styria, 1987. ISBN 3-222-11732-2.
- Ethics in Business and Society: Chinese and Western Perspectives (ed.), Springer, 1996. ISBN 3-540-60773-0.
- Changing Nature’s Course: The Ethical Challenge of Biotechnology (ed. with James P. Buchanan), Hong Kong University Press, 1996. ISBN 962-209-403-1 - Google
- Bioethics and Personhood. [The Kennedy Institute of Ethics Journal, Band 9/4, 1999]. ISSN 1054-6863.
- The Moral Status of Persons: Perspectives on Bioethics (ed.), Rodopi, 2000. ISBN 978-90-420-1201-1 - Google
- Responsibility and Commitment. Eighteen Essays in Honor of Gerhold K. Becker. Edited by Tze-wan Kwan. Waldkirch: Edition Gorz 2008. ISBN 978-3-938095-10-2 - Google. Festschrift.

=== Essays (selection, since 2002) ===
- "The Ethics of Prenatal Screening and the Search for Global Bioethics," Cross-Cultural Perspectives on the (Im)Possibility of Global Bioethics, ed. by Julia Tao Lai Po-wah. Dordrecht: Kluwer Academic Publishers 2002, 105-130.
- "Moral Education in China and the ‘West’: Ideals and Reality in Cross-cultural Perspective," Chinese Ethics in a Global Context: Moral Bases of Contemporary Societies, ed. by Karl-Heinz Pohl & Anselm W. Müller. Sinica Leidensia LVI, Leiden: Brill (October 2002), 245-278.
- "Ethical Issues in the Modernization of China," [Polish tr.: "Etyczne problemy moderniyacji Chin," in China: Social and Political Development at the Threshold of the 21st Century, ed. by Karin Tomala [Chiny: Rozwoj Spoleczenstwa i Panstwa na przelomie XX i XXI wieku]. Warsaw: Trio Publishers, 2003, 49-94.
- "Chinese Ethics and Human Cloning: A View from Hong Kong," Cross-Cultural Issues in Bioethics. The Example of Human Cloning, ed. by Heiner Roetz. Amsterdam/New York: Rodopi 2006, 107-139.
- "Divided Loyalties: The Moral Basis of Peace in a Multicultural World of Conflict and Humiliation," Understanding Conflict and Approaching Peace in Southern Thailand, ed. by Imtiyaz Yusuf/Lars Peter Schmidt. Bangkok: Konrad Adenauer Stiftung 2006, 240-280.
- "Normative Relations: East Asian Perspectives on Biomedicine and Bioethics," Life Nature Contingency, ed. by Marcus Düwell, Dordrecht: Kluwer/Springer 2008, 273-288.
