= Centrone =

Centrone is an Italian surname. Notable people with the surname include:

- Chris Centrone (born 1991), Italian rugby league footballer
- Pablo Centrone (born 1957), Argentine football player and manager
- Stefania Centrone (born 1975), Italian philosopher
