= Kürthy =

Kürthy is a Hungarian surname. Notable people with the surname include:

- András Kürthy, Hungarian opera stage director
- György Kürthy (1882–1972), Hungarian actor
- József Kürthy (1881–1939), Hungarian actor
- Lajos Kürthy (born 1986), Hungarian shot putter
