= Dušan Radonjič =

Slovenian economist (born 1941)

- Born: April 29, 1941 (age 85)

Academic background
- Education: University of Ljubljana; University of Zagreb

Academic work
- Discipline: Marketing
- Institutions: University of Maribor

Dušan Radonjič (born 1941) is a Slovenian economist, university professor (University of Maribor) and member of the European Academy of Sciences and Arts (class of Social Sciences, Law and Economics).

== Education and work ==
In Maribor he finished primary and high school; he studied economics at University of Ljubljana and Zagreb. At latter he completed PhD. He is a tenured professor at Faculty of Economics and Business and also at Faculty of Logistics.

He was also Dean of the school (1987) and twice Vice-Chancellor of University of Maribor (1996–97 and 2003–07).

In 2010 he was running for a position of Chancellor of University of Maribor; he received 4.4% of votes, the least among five candidates.

== Memberships ==
Radonjič is a member of the European Academy of Sciences and Arts and a member of the board of directors of the European Council for Business Education (he was also a president at ECBE).

== Politics ==
In 2008 Slovenian elections he unsuccessfully ran for MP seat as member of the political party Zares. He was party member for 7 months and resigned from the party after the elections.

On 28 May 2014 he was announced as a candidate for a position of Slovenian Prime Minister by seating MP Ivan Vogrin. Radonjič was Vogrin's mentor for his MA thesis in 1999. He didn't receive 10 required MP signatures to be officially named as a candidate.

== Other ==
Between 1986 and 1990, he was president of the Maribor Sport Society Branik (Mariborsko športno društvo Branik).

In 2006, he received Golden crest of Maribor (Zlati grb mesta Maribor).

== See also ==
- List of members of the European Academy of Sciences and Arts
