= Grubačić =

Grubačić (Serbian Cyrillic: Грубачић) is a Serbian surname. Notable people with the surname include:

- Andrej Grubačić (born 1976), Serbian historian and activist
- Slobodan Grubačić (born 1942), Serbian linguist and writer
