= Bruynseraede =

Bruynseraede is a Flemish surname. Notable people with the surname include:

- Roland Bruynseraede (born 1939), Belgian motorsport official
- Yvan Bruynseraede (born 1938), Belgian physicist
