= Devreese =

Devreese is a surname. Notable people with the surname include:

- Frédéric Devreese (1929–2020), Dutch-born Belgian composer and conductor
- Godefroid Devreese (1861–1941), Belgian sculptor
- Jozef T. Devreese (1937–2023), Belgian physicist
