= Brotons =

Brotons or Brotóns is a surname. Notable people with the surname include:

- Antonio Remiro Brotóns (born 1945), Spanish international lawyer and academic
- Salvador Brotons (born 1959), Catalan composer, conductor, and flautist
