= Remiro =

Remiro is a Spanish surname. Notable people with the surname include:

- Agustín Remiro (1904–1942), Spanish anarchist
- Álex Berenguer Remiro (born 1995), Spanish footballer
- Álex Remiro (born 1995), Spanish footballer
- Antonio Remiro Brotóns (born 1945), Spanish lawyer and academic
- Joe Remiro (born 1947), American convicted murderer
