= Von Gabain =

Von Gabain is a surname. Notable people with the surname include:

- Alexander von Gabain, German biologist
- Annemarie von Gabain (1901–1993), German scholar
