= Zoltán Tefner =

Hungarian historian

- Born: 1949 (age 76–77)
- Education: Eötvös Loránd University
- Occupations: Historian, Germanist, academic
- Awards: Szocialista Kultúráért (1980); Szentendrei Nyár Emlékérem (1985) "Kötcséért" Emlékplaket (2006); Pedagógus Szolgálati Emlékérem (2011)

Zoltán Tefner (born 1949 in Kötcse) is a Hungarian historian and Germanist, a university lecturer and an associate professor at Corvinus University of Budapest. He is also a member of the European Academy of Sciences and Arts.

== Education and academic background ==
Tefner began his higher education in 1969 at the ELTE Faculty of Humanities, majoring in History and German. At that time he was admitted to the Eötvös József Collegium, the oldest professional college of Eötvös Loránd University, which aims to support the most talented Hungarian university students and to help them in their academic career.

Between 1980 and 1983, Tefner also completed his second degree as a cultural mediator at the ELTE Faculty of Humanities. He received his doctorate (dr. univ.) from the same university in 1988, his PhD in 1998 and his habilitation in 2006 with the academic degree of dr. habil.

== Career in culture ==
Tefner was assistant librarian at the Library of Hungarian Parliament from 1973 to 1974, and then taught at Ságvár for two years. He then worked as a culture mediator in Siófok, Szentendre and Százhalombatta.

== Academic career ==
In 1991, Tefner was appointed assistant professor at the Corvinus University of Budapest, where he taught social sciences and history in Hungarian and German. He then progressed through the academic ranks at the university, becoming an adjunct professor in 1993, then associate professor in 1999, and a full professor in 2011.

Among his most important subjects and research areas taught were lexicography, Hungarian foreign policy in Austria (1867–1918), the history of Hungarian social policy in the second half of the 19th century and European foreign policy in the 19th century, national minorities and the history of Hungarian social policy in the 19th and 20th centuries.

Tefner has also held senior positions at the Corvinus University of Budapest, serving as a member of the Faculty Council from 1999 to 2002, and as Head of the Centre for Research on Social Policy and History from 2008.

He is a member of the European Academy of Sciences and Arts.

== Membership of scientific and professional organisations ==
- 1996: member of Magyar Történelmi Társulat
- 2000: member of Hungarian-Polish Joint Committee of Historians
- 2011: member of Jakob-Bleyer-Gemeinschaft
- 2013: scientific advisor and manager of „Valutacsoda” Alapítvány”
- 2017: board member of Aspektus Scientific Workshop
- 1975: member of Scientific Dissemination Society
- 2019: leader of the research group of "Kötcséért" Közalapítván Helytörténeti Kutatócsoport
- 2009: head of research group of Budapesti Corvinus Egyetem Szociálpolitika-történeti Kutatóközpont

== Awards ==
In 1980, Tefner won the Szocialista Kultúráért, presented by the Kulturális Minisztérium. In 1985, he won the Szentendrei Nyár Emlékérem, presented by Városi Tanács Szentendre. Tefner was awarded the "Kötcséért" Emlékplakett, presented by Kötcse Község Elöljárósága in 2006, and the Pedagógus Szolgálati Emlékérem, presented by the Nemzeti Erőforrás Minisztérium in 2011.

== Literature ==
In 2023 Tefner published a poetry collection in Hungarian called Lábjegyzetek a dombtetőről.

== Publications ==
His publications include:

- Az Osztrák-Magyar Monarchia lengyelpolitikája a Nagy Háború utolsó napjaiban. In: Karlovitz, János Tibor (szerk.) Applied Sectoral Policies. Grosspetersdorf, Ausztria: Sozial und Wirtschafts Forschungsgruppe. 2024, pp. 285–295.
- Valutapolitika Bécsben és Budapesten. A Wekerle-életmű új megvilágításban: Recenzió Kárbin Ákos új könyvéről. 2024, pp. 56–64.
- Háromszáz év magány: 1946.január 19-én kezdődött a magyarországi németek deportálása. Aspektus, 2024.
- Opinie węgierskich intelektualistów na temat Galicji 1867-1918. Galicja. Studia i materiały 11. 2024, pp. 261-266.
- Leben magische Elemente der Steinzeit weiter? In: Irrtümer in der Forschung der Kolonisationsgeschichte der hessischen Sekundärgemeinde. Kötsching/Kötcse, 2024.
- A "lengyel zsákutca". Burián István második közös külügyminiszteri időszakának ellentmomdásai: 1918. április 16.- 1918, október 24. In: Tibor, János Karlovitz (szerk.) What will our Future be Like? Grosspetersdorf, Ausztria: Sozial und Wirtschafts Forschungsgruppe. 2023, pp. 269-289.
