= Stefan Brunnhuber =

German author, psychiatrist, economist and sociologist

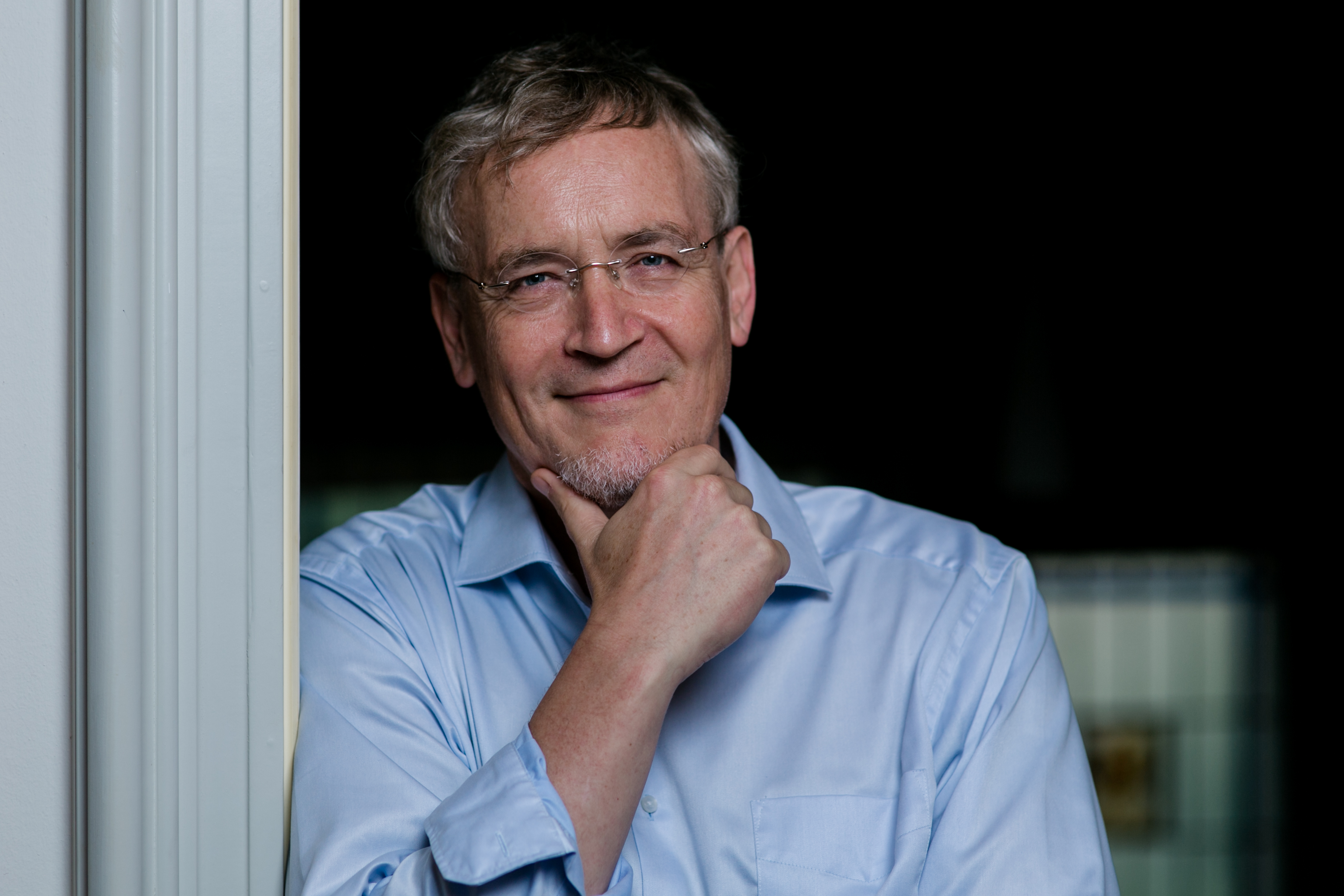
Stefan Brunnhuber

Stefan Brunnhuber (born 2 July 1962 in Augsburg) is a German author, psychiatrist, economist and sociologist who works on sustainable development and transformation strategies, following an interdisciplinary approach. He is a former senator of the European Academy of Sciences and Arts (EASA) and currently a trustee of the World Academy of Art and Science (WAAS), as well as a full international member of the Club of Rome.

== Life and career ==
Following civilian service, vocational training as a medical first responder, and an apprenticeship as a car mechanic, Brunnhuber studied medicine in Ulm, where he was awarded his doctorate in 1993 for a thesis on Martin Buber, Martin Heidegger and Sigmund Freud. He also studied philosophy, social education and economic sociology in Ulm, Munich and Konstanz, where he was awarded a second doctorate in 1998 for a thesis on Karl Popper's concept of an open society.

Brunnhuber trained as a specialist in psychiatry and psychotherapy at University Hospital Saarland (UKS) and worked in addition as a first aid emergency doctor in the Saarland. He subsequently took a post as a senior physician at University Hospital Würzburg (1999–2007). Following visiting professorships in the USA (Mayo Clinic, UCLA), he completed a habilitation degree at the University of Würzburg in the field of medical sociology, medical psychology and psychotherapy. His thesis was entitled "The importance of affect psychology for the formation of psychosomatic symptoms".

Brunnhuber is currently medical director of the Diakonie Kliniken Zschadraß (the academic teaching hospital of TU Dresden and University Hospital Salzburg) and chief physician in the department of psychiatry, psychosomatics and psychotherapy. He holds a chair in sustainability, social medicine, psychosomatics and complementary medicine at Mittweida University of Applied Sciences.

== Research interests and positions ==
Brunnhuber's work focuses on the interdisciplinary integration of theory and practice.

Brunnhuber is a proponent of the critical rationalism and describes himself as a student of the liberal sociologist Ralf Dahrendorf. His work is also influenced by Bernard Lietaer, Ken Wilber, Willigis Jäger, J. M. Keynes, Milton Friedman, Carl Jung, Hans Albert, systems theory, the Desert Fathers, Japanese Zen and high medieval Christian mysticism.

Brunnhuber describes his research interests as following an 'evolutionary, integral, translational, practically oriented, human-centric approach'.

== Memberships ==
Brunnhuber was a senator of the European Academy of Sciences and Arts (EASA) from 2015 to 2019 and is currently a trustee of the World Academy of Art and Science (WAAS), as well as a full international member of the Club of Rome. He is a member of the FDP (German liberal party), Friends of the Earth Germany and the Lancet COVID-19 Commission Task Force on Green Recovery. Since 2022, he has also been a member of the German government's Sustainable Finance Advisory Commidee in the 20th legislative period.

== Personal life ==
Brunnhuber lives with his wife (Stephanie Tache) and their two children in Dresden. A practising Buddhist and Catholic, he describes his professional activities as being embedded in the mystical traditions and practices of Eastern and Western philosophies.

== Works (selection) ==
- B. Lietaer, C. Arnsperger, S. Goerner, S. Brunnhuber (2012) Money and Sustainability (Charmouth: Triarchy Press)
- K. Lieb, S. Frauenknecht, S. Brunnhuber (2015) Intensivkurs Psychiatrie und Psychotherapie, eighth edition (Munich: Urban & Fischer)
- S. Brunnhuber (2018) Die Kunst der Transforma:on: Wie wir lernen, die Welt zu verändern (Freiburg: Herder)
- S. Brunnhuber (2019) Die offene Gesellschaft: Ein Plädoyer für Freiheit und Ordnung im 21. Jahrhundert (Munich: Oekom)
- S. Brunnhuber (2020) The Tao of Finance: The Future Wealth of Nations (Munich: Oekom)
- S. Brunnhuber (2021) Financing Our Future: Unveiling a Parallel Currency System to Fund the SDGs and the Common Good (Basingstoke: Palgrave Macmillan)
- S. Brunnhuber (2023) Financing our Anthropocene: How Wall Street, main street and Central banks are managing, heading und funding our commons (Chur: Springer Nature)
