= Siglind Bruhn =

German musician and musicologist (born 1951)

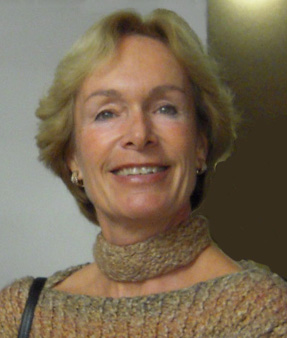
Siglind Bruhn

Siglind Bruhn (born October 11, 1951, in Hamburg) is a German musicologist, writer and concert pianist.

== Biography and Education ==
Siglind Bruhn was born in Hamburg. Her father was the engineer Ernst Bruhn, her mother the interpreter Leonore Bruhn née Kieberger. She studied piano performance, first during the last two years before her high school graduation (Abitur 1970) in the piano class of Professor Eckart Besch at the Musikhochschule Hamburg, then in the master class of Vladimir Horbowski at the Musikhochschule Stuttgart; 1975 State Examen (equivalent to a Master of Music) in piano performance and piano pedagogy. Concurrently she read Romance studies, Comparative Literature, and Philosophy at LMU Munich; 1976 Magister Artium (M.A.) with a thesis on the drama of Ramón del Valle-Inclán. Doctoral studies at the University of Vienna and the University of Music and Performing Arts Vienna; 1985 Dr. phil. summa cum laude with an interdisciplinary dissertation in musical analysis and psychoanalysis ("Die musikalische Darstellung psychologischer Wirklichkeit in Alban Bergs Wozzeck", published with a Distinction-in-Scholarly-Research Grant from the Alban Berg Stiftung, Vienna, Frankfurt: Peter Lang, 450 pp.). Since 1985, she has been married to the philosopher Gerhold K. Becker.

== Career ==
- 1965–2015 Solo and chamber music recitals on all five continents, recordings for broadcasting and television companies throughout Germany and in England (BBC London), France (Radio Gilda, Paris), Switzerland (Radio Basel), Italy (RAI Venice and TVA Bolzano), Hungary (Radio Budapest), Lebanon (Radio du Liban and Télévision du Liban, Beirut), South Africa (SABC Johannesburg) and Australia (Radio 5UV Adelaide)
- 1978–1984 musical director, community music school Unterhaching
- 1984–1987 musical director, Pianisten-Akademie Ansbach
- 1987–1993 director of studies for piano performance pedagogy, University of Hong Kong
- 1993–1997 research associate, Institute for the Humanities, University of Michigan
- 1997– Life Research Associate for Music in Interdisciplinary Dialogue, Institute for the Humanities, University of Michigan

== Awards amd honorary appointments ==
- 2001 Elected Ordinary member of the European Academy of Sciences and Arts
- 2008 Honorary Doctorate (Dr. phil. h.c) from Linnaeus University, Sweden
- 2002–2010 Distinguished Senior Research Fellow at the University of Copenhagen’s Center for Christianity and the Arts
- 2004–2009 chercheur invité at the Sorbonne’s Institut d’esthétique des arts contemporains
- 1990 Guest Professor, Central Conservatory Peking, China
- 2014–2018 Guest Professor for Music of the 20th and 21st centuries at the Music Academies in Kraków and Katowice, Poland.

== Books (English only) ==
- J. S. Bach's Well-Tempered Clavier: In-depth analysis and interpretation. Mainer International, 1993. ISBN 978-962-580-017-2, 978-962-580-018-9, 978-962-580-019-6, 978-962-580-020-2.
- Images and Ideas in Modern French Piano Music: The Extra-Musical Subtext in Piano Works by Ravel, Debussy and Messiaen. Pendragon, 1997. ISBN 978-0-945193-95-1; paperback edition 2010 ISBN 978-1-57647-197-5.
- The Temptation of Paul Hindemith: Mathis der Maler as a Spiritual Testimony. Pendragon, 1998. ISBN 978-1-57647-013-8
- Musical Ekphrasis: Composers Responding to Poetry and Painting, Pendragon, 2000. ISBN 978-1-57647-036-7
- Musical Ekphrasis in Rilke's Marienleben, Rodopi, 2000. ISBN 978-90-420-0800-7
- Saints in the Limelight: Representations of the Religious Quest on the Post-1945 Operatic Stage, Pendragon, 2003. ISBN 978-1-57647-096-1.
- The Musical Order of the World: Kepler, Hesse, Hindemith, Pendragon, 2005. ISBN 978-1-57647-117-3
- Messiaen's Contemplations of Covenant and Incarnation: Musical Symbols of Faith in the two great piano cycles of the 1940s, Pendragon, 2007. ISBN 978-1-57647-129-6
- Messiaen's Explorations of Love and Death: Musical Signification in the Tristan Trilogy and Three related song cycles, Pendragon, 2008. ISBN 978-1-57647-136-4
- Messiaen's Interpretations of Holiness and Trinity: Echoes of Medieval Theology in the Oratorio, Organ Meditations, and Opera, Pendragon, 2008. ISBN 978-1-57647-139-5
- Frank Martin's Musical Reflections on Death, Pendragon 2011. ISBN 978-1-57647-194-4
- The Music of Jörg Widmann, Gorz 2013. ISBN 978-3-938095-17-1
- J. S. Bach's Well-Tempered Clavier: In-depth analysis and interpretation. (Second, completely revised edition in one volume.) Gorz 2014. ISBN 978-3-938095-19-5
- Arnold Schoenberg's Journey from Tone Poems to Kaleidoscopic Sound Colors. Pendragon, 2015. ISBN 978-1-57647-248-4
- Debussy's Vocal Music and its Poetic Evocations. Pendragon, 2018. ISBN 978-1-57647-315-3
- Debussy's Instrumental Music in its Cultural Context. Pendragon, 2019. ISBN 978-1-57647-318-4

== Additional studies in German ==
Ever since she returned to Germany – first between semesters, then permanently – Siglind has once again been publishing more frequently in her native language. Thus she complemented her study of the representation of saints on the operatic stage with one focused on Christ, her writings on musical ekphrasis with introductions to this specialized field for music lovers, her book trilogies on Messiaen and Debussy with tripartite studies of the works of Hindemith, Ravel, and Alban Berg, her focus studies on Frank Martin and Arnold Schoenberg with presentations of works by Jörg Widmann, Henri Dutilleux, and Aribert Reimann, and added a study (also intended for a non-scholarly audience) on song symphonies

== Editorial work ==
Essay collections as contributing author:

- Messiaen's Language of Mystical Love. New York: Garland 1998. ISBN 978-0-8153-2747-9
- Encrypted Messages in Alban Berg's Music . New York: Garland 1998. ISBN 978-0-8153-2480-5
- Signs in Musical Hermeneutics [special issue of The American Journal of Semiotics 13/1-4], 1998. ISSN 0277-7126
- Voicing the Ineffable: Musical Representations of Religious Experience. Hillsdale, NY: Pendragon Press 2002. ISBN 978-1-57647-089-3
- Sonic Transformations of Literary Texts: From Program Music to Musical Ekphrasis. Hillsdale, NY: Pendragon Press 2008. ISBN 978-1-57647-140-1
- 2000–2020, series editor of the book series "Interplay: Music in Interdisciplinary Dialogue" published by Pendragon Press

== Discography ==
- Maurice Ravel: Histoires Naturelles, Modest Mussorgsky: Songs and Dances of Death. Cornelia Kallisch, mezzo-soprano; Siglind Bruhn, piano. LM-M E 2011 1984
- Paul Hindemith: five sonatas for strings and piano. [a] Andrew Jennings, violin, [b] Yizhak Schotten, viola; [c] Bruce Smith, viola d'amore, [d] Anthony Elliott, violoncello; [e] Derek Weller, double bass; piano: Siglind Bruhn, [a ], [c], [e], Katherine Collier [b], Anton Nel [d]. Equilibrium 1995
- Paul Hindemith: five sonatas for woodwinds and piano. [a] Leone Buyse, flute, [b] Harry Sargous, oboe; [c] Fred Ormand, clarinet; [d] Harry Sargous, English horn; [e] Richard Beene, bassoon; piano: Siglind Bruhn, [a], [ b], [e], Anton Nel [c] [d]. Equilibrium 1995
- Paul Hindemith: five sonatas for piano and brass instruments. [a] Charles Darval, trumpet, [b] Bryan Kennedy, French horn, [c] Charles Darval, alto horn, [d] H. Dennis Smith, trombone, [e] Fritz Kaenzig, tuba; piano: Siglind Bruhn, [a ], [b], [e], Robert Conway [c], Anton Nel [d]. Equilibrium 1996
- Paul Hindemith: Ludus tonalis and Reihe kleiner Stücke. Siglind Bruhn, piano. Equilibrium 1996
