= Stefania Centrone =

Italian philosopher

Stefania Centrone (born 1975) is an Italian philosopher who works in Germany as Professor of Philosophy of Science in the Department of Science, Technology and Society at the Technical University of Munich. The topics of her books include temporal logic, the analytic philosophy of Edmund Husserl, Bernard Bolzano, and Oskar Becker, and the philosophy of mathematics.

== Education and career ==
Centrone was born in 1975 in Bari. She became a student of philosophy and logic at the University of Florence, where she received a master's degree in 1999 under the supervision of Ettore Casari. Continuing her studies with Casari at the Scuola Normale Superiore di Pisa, she received a doctorate in 2004.

She continued at the Scuola Normale Superiore di Pisa as a postdoctoral researcher from 2004 to 2008. Next, she worked at the University of Hamburg, with the support of a Humboldt research fellowship, receiving a German habilitation there in 2012. From 2013 to 2018 she continued her research in the Institute for Philosophy at the University of Oldenburg, also working as a visiting professor in 2016 at the University of Göttingen, and as a part-time researcher in 2017 and 2018 at the Department of Philosophy, History and Art Studies of the University of Helsinki. In the meantime she received in 2013 an Italian habilitation for an associate professorship, and in 2018 an Italian habilitation for a full professorship.

From 2018 to 2021 she was supported by the Heisenberg Programme of the German Research Foundation in a position at the Institute of History and Philosophy of Science, Technology, and Literature of Technische Universität Berlin, with continued support from the Heisenberg Programme from 2022 to 2023 for a position at the Institute of Philosophy of the University of Hagen. She took her present position as a full professor at the Technical University of Munich in 2023.

== Books ==
=== Author ===
- Logic and philosophy of mathematics in the early Husserl (Synthese Library 345, Springer, 2010)
- Studien zu Bolzano [Studies on Bolzano] (in German; Beiträge zur Bolzano-Forschung 26, Academia Verlag, 2015)
- Oskar Becker on Modalities (with Pierluigi Minari, Logos Verlag, 2019)
- Oskar Becker, On the logic of modalities (1930): translation, commentary and analysis (with Pierluigi Minari, Synthese Library 444, Springer, 2022)
- Temporal logic: From philosophy and proof theory to artificial intelligence and quantum computing (with Klaus Mainzer, World Scientific, 2023)

=== Edited volumes ===
- Versuche über Husserl [Essays on Husserl] (in German; Felix Meiner, 2013)
- Essays on Husserl’s Logic and Philosophy of Mathematics (Synthese Library 384, Springer, 2017)
- Mathesis Universalis, Computability and Proof (based on the Humboldt-Kolleg "Proof theory as mathesis universalis", Como, Italy, July 24–28, 2017; with Sara Negri, Deniz Sarikaya, and Peter M. Schuster, Springer, 2019)
- Reflections on the Foundations of Mathematics: Univalent Foundations, Set Theory and General Thoughts (Based on the conference on foundations of mathematics: univalent foundations and set theory, FOMUS, Bielefeld, Germany, July 18–23, 2016; with Deborah Kant and Deniz Sarikaya, Synthese Library 407, Springer, 2019)
