= Bernhard Witkop =

American-German organic chemist

- Born: May 9, 1917; Freiburg, Baden, Germany
- Died: November 22, 2010 (aged 93)
- Education: Ludwig-Maximilians-Universität München
- Scientific career
- Fields: Organic Chemistry
- Workplaces: Harvard University
- Doctoral advisor: Heinrich Wieland

Bernhard Witkop (May 9, 1917, in Freiburg, Baden – November 22, 2010, in Chevy Chase, Maryland) was a German-born American organic chemist who worked for the National Institutes of Health (NIH) for 37 years.

During those years, Witkop – along with his recruit, John Daly, and others – discovered the NIH shift, a term describing the movement of hydrogen, deuterium or tritium to adjacent carbons on aromatic rings during oxidation, a process key in developing many therapies. He also helped to develop selective methods for the non-enzymatic cleavage of proteins, which enabled the sequencing of amino acids in proteins as large as immunoglobulin, a method later used in the production of human insulin.

Witkop also helped pioneer the NIH Visiting Fellow Program. Among other foreign scientists, he began attracting visiting researchers to the program from Japan as early as 1955. He traveled frequently to Japan, where he gave talks in classical Japanese. In 1975, Witkop received the Order of the Sacred Treasure, bestowed by the Emperor of Japan.

“He brought in the first visiting fellow from Japan at a time when we were still in the shadow of World War II,” said Kenneth Jacobson, Chief of the NIDDK Laboratory of Bioorganic Chemistry. “He broke the ice.”

Other honors, among many, included election to the National Academy of Sciences (1969) and the American Philosophical Society (1999) as well as the Paul Karrer Gold Medal from the University of Zurich (1971).

Even long after most lights at NIH darkened, Witkop might still be found working in his lab. Thomas Witkop remembers going to visit his father at his West Virginia cabin one evening, and finding all signs that his father was present, except his father. “At approximately 4 a.m., he came rolling back up to the cabin. Apparently, he was at the cabin, had some big idea and drove to the lab at NIH in the middle of the night, did whatever he needed to do, and then came back.” Witkop served as head of the NIDDK Laboratory of Chemistry for 30 years. He was appointed an NIH Institute Scholar in 1987 and a Scholar Emeritus in 1993.

Witkop’s early career coincided with World War II. A German native and Jewish on his mother’s side, he gave much of the credit for his shelter from the Nazis to his mentor at the Ludwig-Maximilians-Universität München, the Nobel Prize-winner Heinrich Wieland.

After a few years at Harvard University, Witkop came to NIH as a fellow in the United States Public Health Service in 1950. Thomas Witkop said his father’s NIH service was a high point of his life.

== See also ==
- List of members of European Academy of Sciences and Arts
- List of members of the National Academy of Sciences
