= András Kürthy =

Hungarian opera stage director

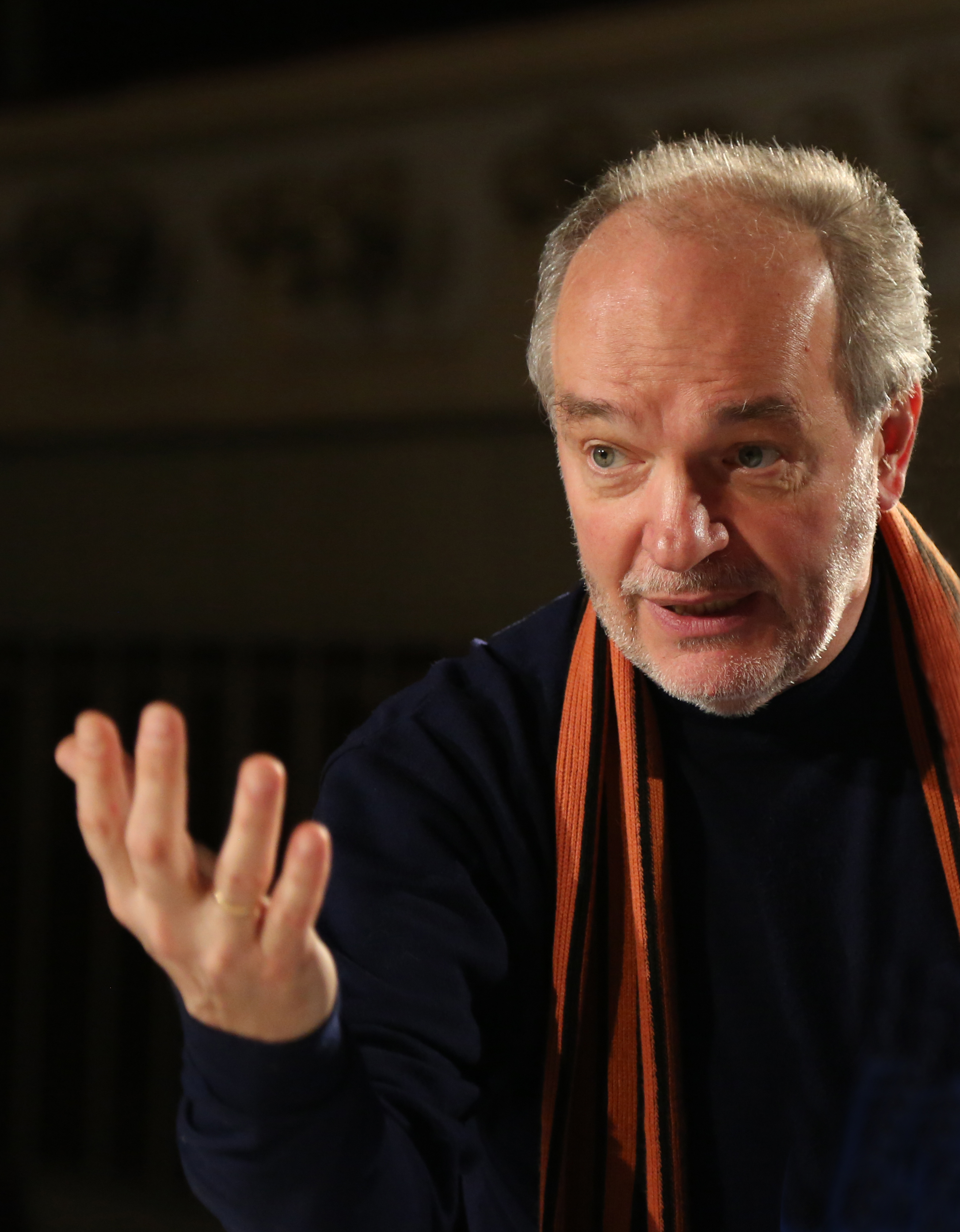
- András Kürthy in the Craiova Opera
- Born: Hungary
- Occupation: Opera stage director

András Kürthy is a Hungarian opera stage director.

== Education ==
Kürthy graduated from Eötvös Loránd University in Budapest. He wrote his M. A. thesis on the history of the Ricordi publishing house and its role in the history of Italian music in the 19th century. He went on studying music, musicology and theatrical art in Budapest, Rome and Milan. He did research on Verdi's operatic oeuvre. In 1987/88 he won his second scholarship as stage director to study in Italy at the Teatro alla Scala in Milan, which had a decisive impact on his career. He worked with stage directors Michael Bogdanov, Michael Hampe, Roberto De Simone and Luca Ronconi and with composer Karlheinz Stockhausen on productions of Teatro alla Scala and Teatro Romolo Valli (Reggio Emilia).

== Career ==
From 1985 to 1992 he was member of the Hungarian State Opera House, Budapest, first as assistant stage director, later as chief dramaturg, then secretary general and finally as programme director.

Between 1991 and 2001 he worked as a permanent guest director at the Cluj-Napoca Hungarian Opera (Romania). There he realised a most successful series of stagings: Simon Boccanegra, Macbeth and Nabucco by Verdi, the world premiere of a Hungarian rock opera as well as several gala evenings and guest performances. For his activities there he was awarded the Ruzitska József Prize in 2001.

From 1991 till 2003 he worked with the Rudas Theatrical Organization on Luciano Pavarotti's large concerts and on The Three Tenors (Pavarotti, Domingo and Carreras) productions. As stage director, he took part in a Turandot production in Beijing and held master classes in China several times.

In 1995 he started his own production (Opera Viva) in Budapest, which launched summer festivals and set up an opera studio for young artists to acquire and practice stage skills.

In 2011 he started a bi-weekly radio series on opera titled Stage Director's Score on Hungarian Catholic Radio.

In 2012 he held an opera workshop at the Hungarian Opera House of Cluj (Romania) and made a new production of L'elisir d'amore by Donizetti.

In 2013 he directed Aida by Verdi in two occasions: the first in April, in Iasi, Romania, and the second one in July, in Szombathely, Hungary.

In 2014 he directed Opera Romana Craiova's production of The Gypsy Princess (Silvia) by Emmerich Kálmán.

The following year, he returned successfully to Craiova with a new version of L'elisir d'amore

In 2016, he returned to Cluj, this time, to the Romanian National Opera, directing the national premiere of I Puritani by Vincenzo Bellini. He returned to Bellini's work in the city of Târgu Mureş, where he directed La sonnambula in 2018, a year after his first production in the city, when he directed La traviata by Giuseppe Verdi.

In 2018, he directed a gala concert ("Do You Remember?") in honour of soprano Melinda Marton in Cluj, his second work honouring a local singer, after the first one in 2001 ("Vissi d'arte"), honouring soprano Júlia Kirkósa.

== Operatic productions ==
- Vincenzo Bellini: I puritani (2016)
- Vincenzo Bellini: La sonnambula (2018)
- Gaetano Donizetti: L'elisir d'amore (1996, 1997, 2012, 2015)
- Baldassare Galuppi: Il caffé di campagna (2011)
- Joseph Haydn: Il mondo della luna, (2011)
- Emmerich Kálmán: The Gypsy Princess
- Wolfgang Amadeus Mozart: Così fan tutte (2009)
- Wolfgang Amadeus Mozart: Der Schauspieldirektor (1993, 1995, 2003)
- Wolfgang Amadeus Mozart: Don Giovanni (2005, 2007)
- Wolfgang Amadeus Mozart: The Marriage of Figaro (2008)
- Giovanni Battista Pergolesi: La serva padrona (as TV production as well) (1993, 1995)
- Giacomo Puccini: Turandot (2001)
- Franz Lehár: The Merry Widow (1994)
- Gioachino Rossini: La Cenerentola (2010)
- Venczel: King Matthias (rock opera) (1996)
- Giuseppe Verdi: Simon Boccanegra (1992)
- Giuseppe Verdi: Il trovatore (1992)
- Giuseppe Verdi: Aida (1993, 2013)
- Giuseppe Verdi: Macbeth (1994)
- Giuseppe Verdi: Nabucco (2001)
- Giuseppe Verdi: La traviata (2017)

== Awards ==
Ruzitska József Prize (2001): for his activities at the Cluj-Napoca Hungarian Opera.

Value of the Opera Prize (2013): for his production of Aida at the Romanian National Opera of Iasi.

== Other activities ==
András Kürthy has worked on the juries of some of the most acclaimed singing competitions all over the world. He is member of the European Academy of Sciences and Arts of Salzburg. He is also active in the field of photographic art. He has had several photo exhibitions and published an album. He took part in the jury of numerous singing competitions, which include:

- "Francisco Vinas", Barcelona
- "Bel canto", Antwerpen
- "Toti dal Monte", Treviso
- "Katia Ricciarelli", Mantova
- "Placido Domingo", Bécs–Párizs
- "Luciano Pavarotti", Budapest–Philadelphia
- "Lucia Popp", Pozsony
- "Emmy Destinn", České Budějovice
- "Elena Teodorini", Craiova
- "Virginia Zeani", Târgu Mureş
- "Házy Erzsébet", Nové Zamky
