= Yvan Bruynseraede =

Belgian physicist

Yvan J. Bruynseraede (born 1938 in Ostend, Belgium) is a condensed matter experimental physicist, known for his work on multilayers and superlattices, and his interests are thin films, nanostructures, novel materials, magnetism, and superconductivity. He is currently Professor Emeritus at the Catholic University of Leuven (KU Leuven), and a member of the Quantum Solid-State Physics Laboratory.

== Academic career ==
Yvan Bruynseraede graduated (Belgian Licentiate) in 1961 from the KULeuven where he received his PhD in Physics in 1967, after a two-year interruption for military service.

After a postdoctoral and associate fellowship at CERN, Switzerland (1968–1971), he started his career as a lecturer at KU Leuven in 1972 and became full professor in 1977. He was chairman of the Laboratory of Solid-State Physics and Magnetism, KU Leuven (1993–2003). In 2003 he became professor emeritus of physics at KU Leuven, a position in which he is currently active. He held visiting positions at Université Côte d'Azur, Nice, France; the Argonne National Laboratory, US; and the University of California at San Diego, US.

== Scientific research ==
At CERN he was active in the development of a superconducting particle separator by studying the HF properties of superconducting materials for electromagnetic cavities.

At KU Leuven, his research was mainly focused on superconductivity and magnetism. He studied the electrical, magnetic and optical properties of mesoscopic and nanoscopic systems, particularly at low temperatures and very high magnetic fields. He performed research on thin films, multilayers and superlattices, studying superconducting Josephson phenomena, tunneling and vortices; superconducting/magnetic interactions; X-ray structural analysis and SPM techniques applied to surfaces and interfaces. His research activities resulted in more than 450 publications in international scientific journals, 100 Invited talks, and the promotorship of 35 PhD and 70 MSc theses.

== Distinctions and awards ==
- Recipient, Grand Officer of the Order of Leopold (Belgium) (Grootofficier in de Leopoldsorde) (2013)
- Member (1988–present) and President (1999–2000), The Royal Flemish Academy of Belgium for Science and the Arts (Koninklijke Vlaamse Academie voor Wetenschappen en Kunsten)
- Member, The European Academy of Sciences and Arts, Vienna, Austria (2001–present)
- Member, The Royal Society of Arts and Sciences in Gothenburg, Sweden (2005–present)
- Fellow, American Physical Society (1990–present)
- Member, Board of Trustees, KU Leuven (2003–2013)
- Member, Association Council, KU Leuven (2003–2013)
- Member, Board of Governors, Nuclear Research Center SCK CEN, Mol (1991 – 2013)
- Chair, Research Council, KU Leuven (1990–1995)
- Chair, American Physical Society “Forum on Outreach and Engaging the Public" (FOEP) (2016)
- Recipient, IUMRS SOMIYA Award, together with Ivan K. Schuller of UCSD (2007)
