= Jozef T. Devreese =

Belgian scientist

Jozef T. Devreese (born March 20, 1937; died November 1, 2023) was a Belgian scientist, with a long career in condensed matter physics. He was professor emeritus of theoretical physics at the University of Antwerp.

== Academic career ==
Devreese graduated in 1960 from the Katholieke Universiteit Leuven where he received his PhD in science, group physics in 1964. From 1961 till 1966 he worked at the Solid State Physics Department of the Research Centre for Nuclear Energy (SCK-CEN) in Mol (Belgium). In 1966 he started his work as lecturer and then full professor (from 1969) at the University of Antwerp, where he founded the research group TFVS (Theoretische Fysica van de Vaste Stoffen). From 1977 he became also 'professor extraordinarius' at the Technische Universiteit Eindhoven (the Netherlands).

== Scientific research ==
He contributed to the theory of polarons (see reviews in particular their optical and magnetooptical properties, quantum theory of solid matter, superconductivity and superfluidity, Feynman path integrals and mathematical methods structures with reduced dimension and dimensionality nanophysics).

The results of his research are published in about 500 articles in international scientific journals. According to the Web of Knowledge, there are more than 8300 citations of these publications in about 4300 citing papers.

== Cultural interests ==
As amateur of classical music, he contributed to the realization on the Metzler organ in the Our Lady Cathedral in Antwerp (1993) and he was chairman (2000–2002) of the Flemish Institute for Organ Art (VIVO). He also contributed to the study of the work of Simon Stevin and to the promotion of the Dutch language and culture in the internationalized society.

== Distinctions / awards ==
- Three-annual prize for exact and natural sciences of the "Vlaamse Leergangen" of the Katholieke Universiteit Leuven (1972).
- Fellow of the American Physical Society (1990), Fellow of the European Physical Society (2006) and Fellow of the Institute of Physics, UK (2000).
- Doctor Honoris Causa of Moldova State University (1995), Honorary Member of the Academy of Sciences of the Republic of Moldova (2001).
- Member of the European Academy of Sciences and Arts (Salzburg, 2005).
