= Boštjan Marko Turk =

Slovenian literature professor (born 1967)

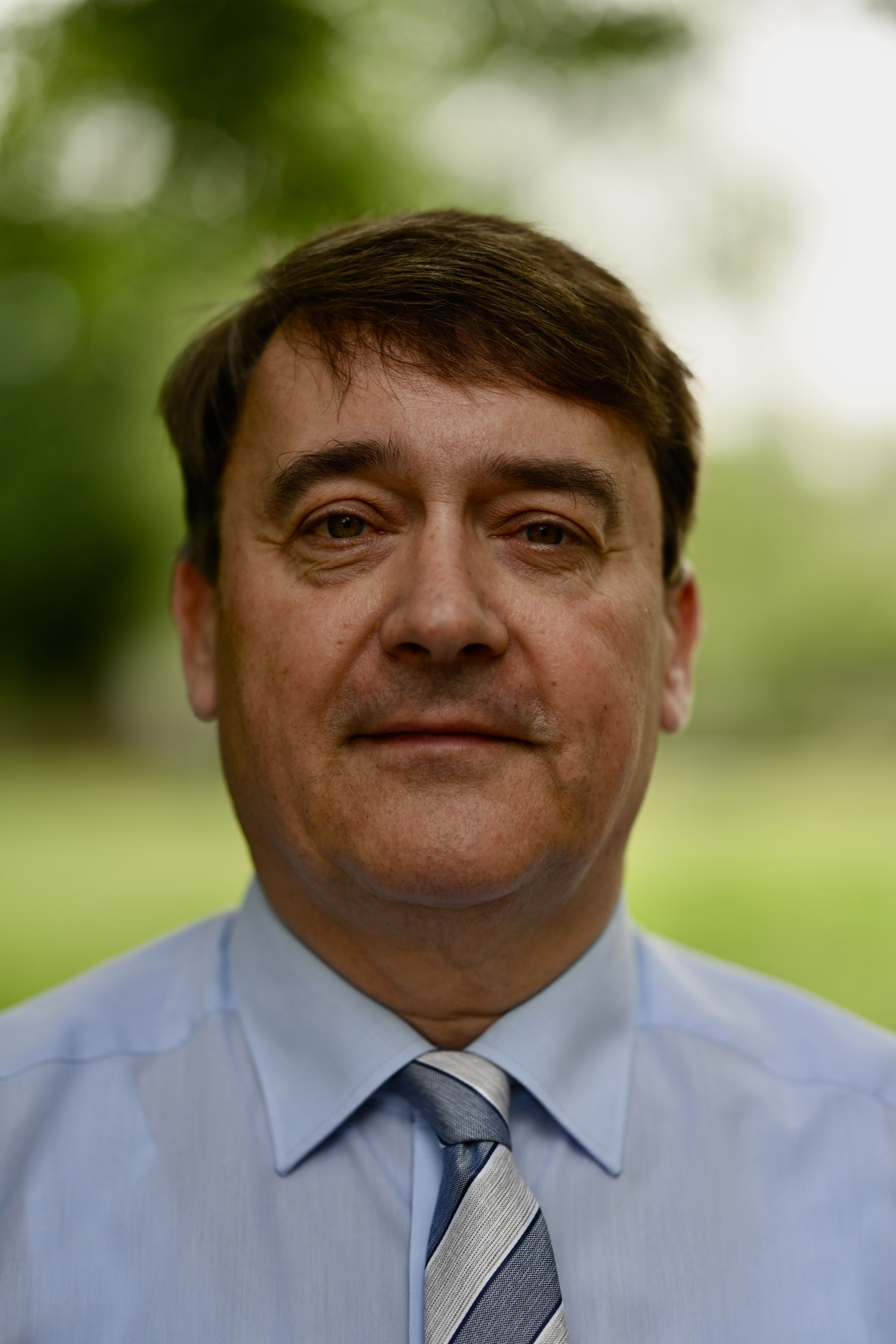
- Born: 1 February 1967; Ljubljana, Yugoslavia
- Occupations: Full professor at the University of Ljubljana, Faculty of Arts

Academic background
- Education: University of Ljubljana, Sorbonne University
- Doctoral advisor: Dominique Millet-Gérard

Academic work
- Discipline: French literature; Slovene literature; cultural studies; ontology; political theory; post-communist societies
- Sub-discipline: French literature from Middle Ages to 20th century; Transitional period of ex-communist countries, postmodernism
- Institutions: University of Ljubljana; Sorbonne University; Institut national des langues et civilisations orientales; European Academy of Sciences and Arts
- Website: https://www.ff.uni-lj.si/en/staff/bostjan-marko-turk, https://bostjan-marko-turk.si

Boštjan Marko Turk (born 1 February 1967) is a Slovenian university professor of French literature at the University of Ljubljana.

== Career ==
Boštjan Marko Turk received his BA and MA degrees at the University of Ljubljana. He earned his doctorate at Université Paris-Sorbonne under the supervision of Dominique Millet-Gérard in 2001.

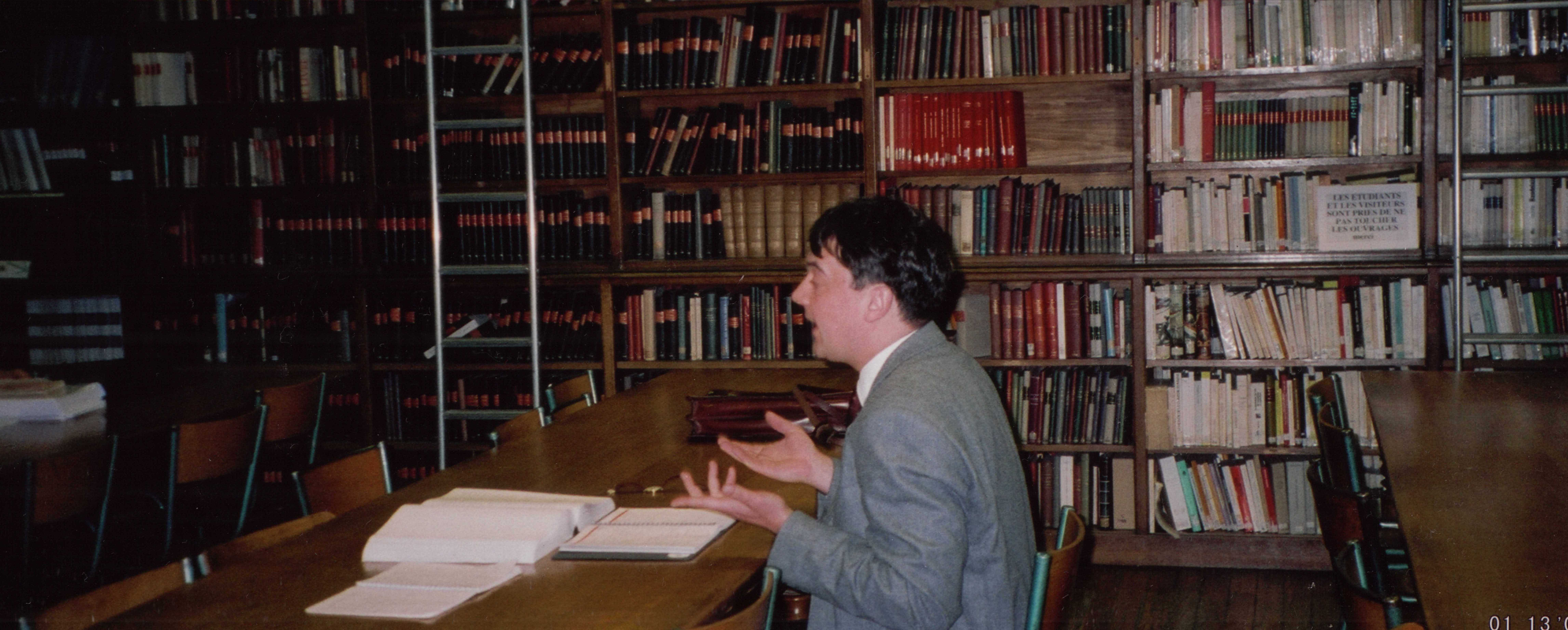
Boštjan Marko Turk at the defence of his doctoral thesis at the University of Paris-Sorbonne, Paris-IV on 13 January 2001.

He spent an academic year lecturing at the Institut National des Langues et Civilisations Orientales in Paris, and for a shorter period at Université Toulon et du Var. He lectured at: Université Paris-Sorbonne, Université Paris II Panthéon-Assas, Masaryk University, Comenius University, University of Brașov, Zaporizhzhia National University, Jagiellonian University in Kraków, Palacký University Olomouc, and in the Croatian Academic Club and elsewhere.

In February 2020, he became a member of the European Academy of Sciences, Arts and Letters in Paris, and in March of the same year, he also became a member of the European Academy of Sciences and Arts in Salzburg. There, in January 2025, he was elected Dean of its first class, Humanities. Additionally, he is one of the editors of PEASA.

== Research ==
Boštjan Marko Turk's doctoral research focused on exploring the influence of medieval philosophy on Paul Claudel's poetic works, particularly Les Cinq Grandes Odes. His findings were summarized in the monograph Paul Claudel et l'Actualité de l'être, which Dominique Millet-Gérard acknowledged for its significant contribution to the understanding of Claudel's work in French-speaking circles.

Turk emphasized the importance of Franjo Krsto Frankopan's translation of Molière's George Dandin into Slovenian, which represents the earliest roots of Slovenian and Slavic theatre. This translation predates the conventionally recognized start of Slovenian theatre, typically associated with Anton Tomaž Linhart's translation of Beaumarchais' Mariage de Figaro. Frankopan's work is notable for being the first Molière translation in Slovenian and any Slavic language.

Turk's studies on French classicism included an analysis of J. B. P. Molière's works through Henri Bergson's comic theory, as well as investigations into the social themes in Molière's plays and the tension between fate and free will in Pierre Corneille's dramas. He also explored the religious aspects of Corneille's writings.

His research extended to Maurice Maeterlinck's poetry, the Symbolist movement, and Surrealism, including the avant-garde contributions of Srečko Kosovel. He also studied Henri Bergson's influence on Guillaume Apollinaire's poetics.

Turk examined the interplay between fine art and French literature, analyzing connections such as Maurice Barrès and El Greco, Auguste Rodin and Dante, and the concept of mise en abyme in André Gide's Les Faux monnayeurs and Jan van Eyck's painting Giovanni Arnolfini et sa femme.

Turk researched the painting of France Kralj, with a special focus on his Annunciation. Through a detailed analysis of the spiritual and artistic components, he arrived at the synthesis that this work represents a unique depiction within the topology of the Annunciation—namely, that Angel Gabriel and Virgin Mary are united within a single pictorial plane. He explained the ontological reasons for this.

In Slovenian literature, Turk explored its intersections with Italian and French cultural influences, focusing on authors like Primož Trubar, Tobia Lionelli, France Prešeren, Ivan Cankar, Oton Župančič, Edvard Kocbek, Dane Zajc, and Boris Pahor. This work resulted in publications such as Bergsonism and its Place in Slovenian Spiritual History (2000), Language as a Guide in the Labyrinth (2008), and Far from the World (2011).

In his 2017 work Cote 101, Turk employed George Orwell's paradigms to analyze societal structures in post-Yugoslav states. His books The Twelve Walls (2013), The Prisoners of Liberty (2024) and The Silenced Side (2025) delve into literary insights applied to contemporary societal issues.

Turk collaborated with Stéphane Courtois on texts addressing recent historical transitions in various countries. His latest book, The War in the Name of Peace: The Revolution '68 and the Disintegration of the West, published in 2023 in Slovenian and Croatian in 2024 in Ukrainian, and in 2025 in English examines the intellectual and spiritual dynamics of modern Western society. A French edition is expected soon.

He also researched the role of French Freemasonry at the Versailles Peace Conference (1919) and in the formation of the Kingdom of Yugoslavia, identifying the first Yugoslavia as a significant Masonic project.

Most of Turk's monographs are extensive, exceeding 350 pages and some reaching nearly 800, with a word count ranging from 1 to 1.6 million characters (including spaces).

Bostjan Marko Turk contributes to Slovenian and Croatian newspapers and has written for international publications in several European languages. He writes for a prominent website of the Polish Solidarity Trade Union. He is also a contributor to French magazines such as Le Diplomate, Communisme_(revue), and Catholica. He has also published commentary in L'Osservatore Romano, The Kyiv Post, and The European Conservative. In April 2026, L'Osservatore Romano published his article “Oltre fisico e metafisico”, dealing with the relationship between the physical and metaphysical dimensions of human existence in the context of contemporary science and artificial intelligence.

In June 2026, The European Conservative published his analysis “The War Before the War: Europe's Civilizational Crisis Began Long Before Ukraine”. His author page at The Kyiv Post lists his August 2026 opinion article “The Lost Art of Power: From Helmut Kohl's Resolve to Europe's Strategic Decay”. He has also appeared on television and conducted interviews with European intellectuals. Turk has authored more than 1,100 articles and ten professional or scientific monographs in five languages. On television programs like Exodus, he conducts interviews with notable French intellectuals. Fluent in Slovenian, French, English, Italian, German, and Croatian, he can also read Polish and Latin.

His bibliography can be accessed on the Cobiss and Orcid websites.

== Awards ==
- Turk won the Prešeren's University Prize in 1993.
- The Grand Golden Plaque of The Association of Croatian Homeland War Veterans 1991 (UHBDR91) in 2025.
