= Slobodan Grubačić =

Slobodan Grubačić was Dean of the Faculty of Philology at the University of Belgrade. He is an elected member of Serbian Academy of Sciences and Arts. Father of Andrej Grubacic. Son of Emilija Grubačić and Kosta Grubačić.

== Honors and awards ==
Grubačić has been awarded a Humboldt Prize and membership of the National Committee for Cooperation with UNESCO. He is an elected member of the Association of Writers of Serbia and is a member of the European Academy of Sciences and Arts.

== Some key publications ==
Grubačić, Slobodan (2006) Alexandria Lighthouse. Post-Modern Interpretations of the Alexandrian School Karlovci-Srem Novi Sad: Izd. knjižarnica Zoran Stojanovic

Grubačić, Slobodan (2008) The Spirit and Understanding (anthology), Belgrade: Informatics

Grubačić, Slobodan (2009) History of German Culture Sremski Karlovci-Novi Sad: Publishing knjižarnica Z. Stojanovic
