= Centre for Applied Ethics =

Ethics organization in Hong Kong

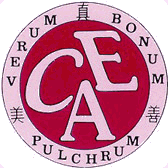
- Formation: 13 May 1992
- Type: Research Centre
- Location: Kowloon Tong, Hong Kong
- Website: https://web.archive.org/web/20091119080038/http://www.cae.hkbu.edu.hk:80/

Centre for Applied Ethics (CAE) at Hong Kong Baptist University was founded in 1992. It is the first of its kind established in China and one of the earliest in Asia. The Centre strives to stimulate critical reasoning about fundamental ethical concerns in contemporary society, to raise awareness of moral values, and to further strengthen the University's commitment to research and whole person education. To accomplish its mission, the Centre has been active in organizing various academic activities, publishing research results in different fields of Applied Ethics and developing a co-operation network with other institutions.

== Objectives ==
- The Centre is committed to research which covers the whole range of applied ethics. It is particularly concerned with different areas which are of high importance to our society.
- The Centre will take keen interest in avoiding any sort of ivory-tower mentality and make sure that its efforts benefit society and public at large. This will be achieved particular by organizing symposia, conferences and individual lectures open to the public and publishing research papers and articles in academic journals and taking up ethical topics in newspapers.

== Research Areas ==
The Centre actively promotes and coordinates research in the areas of bioethics, business ethics, professional ethics, and social ethics. It encourages the development of ethics across the curriculum.

== Academic Activities ==
The "Public Lecture Series: Applied Ethics in Hong Kong" was launched on 1992 and regularly invites local and overseas scholars to deliver public lectures on bioethics, business ethics, environmental ethics, family ethics etc. Distinguished international speakers, include Jürgen Habermas and Hans Küng. In order to foster research in the field of Bioethics in the Chinese context, since 2007 the centre has organized an annual Summer Class on "Sino-American Perspectives in Bioethics" and Symposium on "Bioethics from Chinese Philosophical/Religious Perspectives."

- Seminar on Animal Ethics - Status of Animals: A Dialogue between Theology and Philosophy (2022)
- The 16th Symposium on “Bioethics from Chinese Philosophical/Religious Perspectives" (2022)
- Public Lecture on "Just War Theory and Ukraine War" (2022)
- Conference on "New Debates on Human Rights and East Asian Philosophical Traditions: Confucianism and Beyond" (2022)
- The 15th Symposium on "Bioethics from Chinese Philosophical/ Religious Perspectives" (2021)
- Public Lecture on "Chinese and Cross-Cultural Health Humanities Lecture Series: Why is this Pandemic Unprecedented?" (2021)
- The 14th Conference on Constructing Bioethics in China (2021)
- Public Lecture on "COVID-19 Vaccine: Hopes, Hypes and Fairness" (2020)
- The 13th Symposium on “Bioethics from Chinese Philosophical/Religious Perspectives” (2019)
- Public Lecture on "Big Data, Algorithms and Education - On the Ethical Challenges of Educational Technology" (2018)
- Conference on "Christianity and Modern Chinese Constitution Politics" (2018)
- The 12th Symposium on “Bioethics from Chinese Philosophical/Religious Perspectives” (2018)
- The Eleventh Symposium on “Bioethics from Chinese Philosophical/Religious Perspectives” (2017)
- Public Lecture on A Marginal Case of Morality: Should We Eat Meat? (2016)
- The Tenth Symposium on “Bioethics from Chinese Philosophical/Religious Perspectives (2016)
- Public Lecture on Designer Babies: Choosing Our Children's Genes (2015)
- Public Lecture on Public Space, Public Awareness and Education on Public Ethics (2015)
- The Ninth Symposium on “Bioethics from Chinese Philosophical/Religious Perspectives” (2015)
- The Eighth Symposium on “Bioethics from Chinese Philosophical/Religious Perspectives” (2014)
- The Seventh Symposium on “Bioethics from Chinese Philosophical/Religious Perspectives” (2013)
- The Sixth Symposium on “Bioethics from Chinese Philosophical/Religious Perspectives” (2012)
- International Symposium on Chinese Ethics of War and Peace: Traditional Approaches and Contemporary Problems (2011)
- Public Lecture on Good Lawyer, Bad Lawyer: Professional Ethics in China (2011)
- Public Lecture on Dragon and Dove: Nation-Statism & Christianity in Today's China (2011)
- Moral Theory of a Classical Economist: Adam Smith Case Study (2010)
- Public Lecture on Hospital Clinical Ethics Committee: What Went Right and What Went Wrong? (2010)
- Public Lecture on Health Care and the Common Good (2010)
- The Third Summer Class on Sino-American Perspectives in Bioethics (2010)
- The Fourth Symposium on Bioethics from Chinese Philosophical/Religious Perspectives (2010)
- Public Lecture on Cloning and Stem Cells: A Bioethical Analysis (2010)
- The Second Summer Class on Sino-American Perspectives in Bioethics (2009)
- The Third Symposium on Bioethics from Chinese Philosophical/Religious Perspectives (2009)
- Public Lecture on Why is Ethics relevant to Public Health? (2009)
- Public Lecture on Allocation of Medical Resources: What it means for Hong Kong (2009)
- Public Lecture on Caring for Nature: From Respect to Reverence (2008)

== Research Publications ==
The Centre has published the International Journal of Chinese and Comparative Philosophy of Medicine since 1998. It also publishes a newsletter annually to facilitate the exchange of ideas between the local academic community and other institutions worldwide. Some of the Centre’s recent publications include:

Books

- Building Chinese Bioethics in the Time of COVID-19 (2021)
- Construction of Chinese Bioethics: New Investigations (2017)
- Collected Essays from the Conference on Pre-Qin Philosophers and War Ethics (2016)
- Chinese Just War Ethics: Original, development, and dissent (2015)
- The Common Good: Chinese and American Perspectives (2013)
- Bioethics: A Reflection from Traditional Chinese Philosophy (2013)
- Ritual and the Moral Life: Reclaiming the Tradition (2012)

Journals

- International Journal of Chinese and Comparative Philosophy of Medicine

== Co-operation Networks ==
In order to establish and coordinate regional and international network of Applied Ethics, the Centre has co-organized symposia and conferences with other institutions such as:

- Conference on Military Ethics: China in Dialogue with the West (Co-organized with FSU's Center for the Advancement of Human Rights in 2016]
- International Conference on Confucianism and Virtue Ethics (Co-organized with Peking University in 2010)
- International Conference on The Common Good for the 21st Century: Beyond Individualism and Collectivism —— A Sino–American Dialogue (Co-organized with University of Notre Dame in 2009 and 2011)
- International Conference on Constructing Chinese Bioethics and Deepening Health-care Reform (Co-organized with Xi’an Jiaotong University in 2009)
- Symposium on Family-Friendly Policy: A Holistic Approach to Enhance Hong Kong Families (Co-organized with Centre for Life Education in 2009)
- Symposium on Human Rights from the Perspective of Applied Ethics (Co-organized with Chinese Academy of Social Science in 2008)
- International Conference on Genethics in East Asian And Western Context (Co-organized with University of Oxford in 2007)
- Conference on Confucian-Christian Dialogue in Contemporary Contexts: Thought and Praxis (Co-organized with Shandong University in 2007)
