= Antonio Remiro Brotóns =

Spanish international lawyer and academic

- Born: 17 September 1945 (age 80); Elche, Spain
- Education: University of Bologna
- Scientific career
- Fields: International law
- Workplaces: Autonomous University of Madrid

Antonio Remiro Brotóns (born 17 September 1945) is a Spanish international lawyer and academic. He is an emeritus professor of public international law at the Autonomous University of Madrid and a member of the Institut de Droit International and the Permanent Court of Arbitration.

== Career ==
Remiro Brotóns was born in 1945 Elche, Spain. He received a LL.D. from the University of Bologna in 1969 while residing in the Collegio di Spagna. He defended a thesis entitled Il mantenimento della pace e della sicurezza internazionale americana nel quadro dell'Organizzazione degli Stati Americani e della carta delle Nazione Unite. This earned Remiro Brotóns the 1969 "Vittorio Emanuele II" prize for best thesis of the Faculty of Law of University of Bologna. From 1971 to 1981, he taught at the University of Murcia, where he became a professor and was appointed dean of the Faculty of Law and vice-chancellor of the university. Since 1981, Remiro Brotóns is a professor of public international law at the Autonomous University of Madrid. Here he served as dean from 1983 to 1985.

Remiro Brotóns has been counsel and lawyer for many governments, including the Spanish government, in the area of public international law. He has defended El Salvador, Nicaragua, Bolivia and his native Spain in contentious cases before the International Court of Justice. He also was counsel and lawyer for Argentina during the aftermath of the Laguna del Desierto incident.

Remiro Brotóns has been a lecturer at several research and higher education institutions, among them Panthéon-Assas University, the Graduate Institute of International and Development Studies, El Colegio de México and the Hague Academy of International Law. In 2010, he received a degree honoris causa from the Autonomous University of Santo Domingo due to his contributions to international law in Latin America. He is a member of the European Academy of Sciences and Arts.

== Other ==
Remiro Brotóns has appeared in Spanish television and radio multiple times. From 1990 to 1992, he presented Telecinco's daily news bulletin on international politics Entre Hoy y Mañana. Remiro Brotóns taught law to Felipe VI of Spain during 1992 and 1993. He is a member of the Board of Editors of Oxford Bibliography On Line: International Law.
