= Klaus Mainzer =

German philosopher (born 1947)

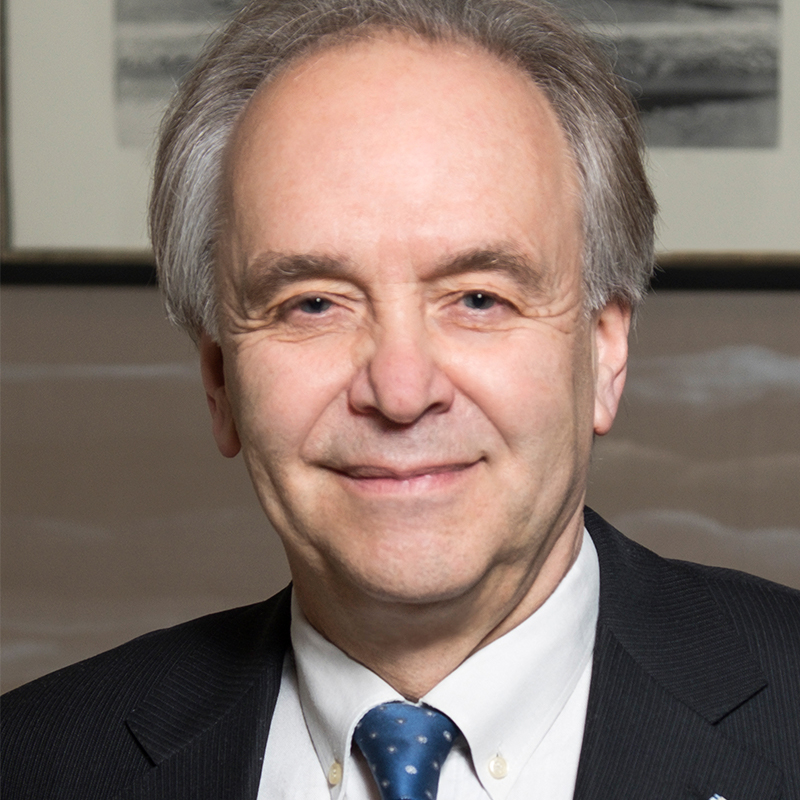
- Mainzer in 2018
- Born: 1947 (age 78–79)
- Education: Landrat-Lucas-Gymnasium
- Occupations: Philosopher and scientist

Klaus Mainzer (born 1947) is a German philosopher and scientist. Mainzer is the president of the European Academy of Sciences and Arts. He is the author of the widely translated, cited, and reviewed book Thinking in Complexity.

== Academic career ==
Mainzer graduated from the Landrat-Lucas-Gymnasium in Opladen and studied mathematics, physics and philosophy. In 1973, he obtained a doctorate in philosophy and mathematics fundamentals ("Mathematical Constructivism"). In 1979, Mainzer got his habilitation in philosophy with a thesis on "Space, Geometry and Continuum" at the University of Münster. In 1980, he received a Heisenberg grant. He was a professor for the basic theory and history of exact sciences at the University of Konstanz from 1981 to 1988. He was the Vice-Rector of the University of Konstanz between 1985 and 1988.

From 1988 to 2008, Klaus Mainzer was a professor of the philosophy of science and director of the Institute for Philosophy. Since 1998, he is the founding director of the Interdisciplinary Institute for Computer Science at the University of Augsburg. Between 2008 and 2016, he held the chair for philosophy and philosophy of science at the Technical University of Munich (TUM). Mainzer was appointed director of the Carl von Linde Academy. He was the Munich Center for Technology in Society (MCTS) founding director at the Technical University of Munich (TUM) between 2012 and 2016. Since 2016, Mainzer has been "TUM Emeritus of Excellence." Since 2019, Mainzer has been Senior Professor at the Faculty of Mathematics and Natural Sciences and the Tübingen Center for Advanced Studies (TüCAS) at the Eberhard Karls University of Tübingen.

He was a member of the Advisory Board of the TUM Institute for Advanced Study (IAS) (2009-2016), Principal Investigator (PI) of the TUM Cluster of Excellence Cognition in Technical Systems (CoTeSys) (2009-2014) and a member of the Editorial Board of the International Journal of Bifurcation and Chaos in Applied Sciences and Engineering (2005-2015). He is a member of the Research Center for Education and Information (Beijing University), the Academia Europaea (London), the European Academy of Sciences and Arts (Salzburg) and there Dean of the Class for Natural Sciences 2018–2019, member of the German Academy of Science and Engineering (acatech), there spokesman for the work project "Responsibility" 2018–2019 and since 2018 spokesman for the working group "Basic Questions." Mainzer was a member of the Board of Trustees of the Daimler and Benz Foundation (Ladenburg) (1998–2008) and has been Deputy Chairman of the Board of Trustees of the Udo Keller Foundation Forum Humanum (Hamburg) since 2014.

He gave guest lectures or carried out visiting professorships in Brazil, China, India, Japan, South Korea, United States and Russia. He was a visiting scientist at the Euler International Mathematical Institute (St. Petersburg), the Hausdorff Research Institute for Mathematics (Bonn) and the Leibniz Center for Informatics at Schloss Dagstuhl.

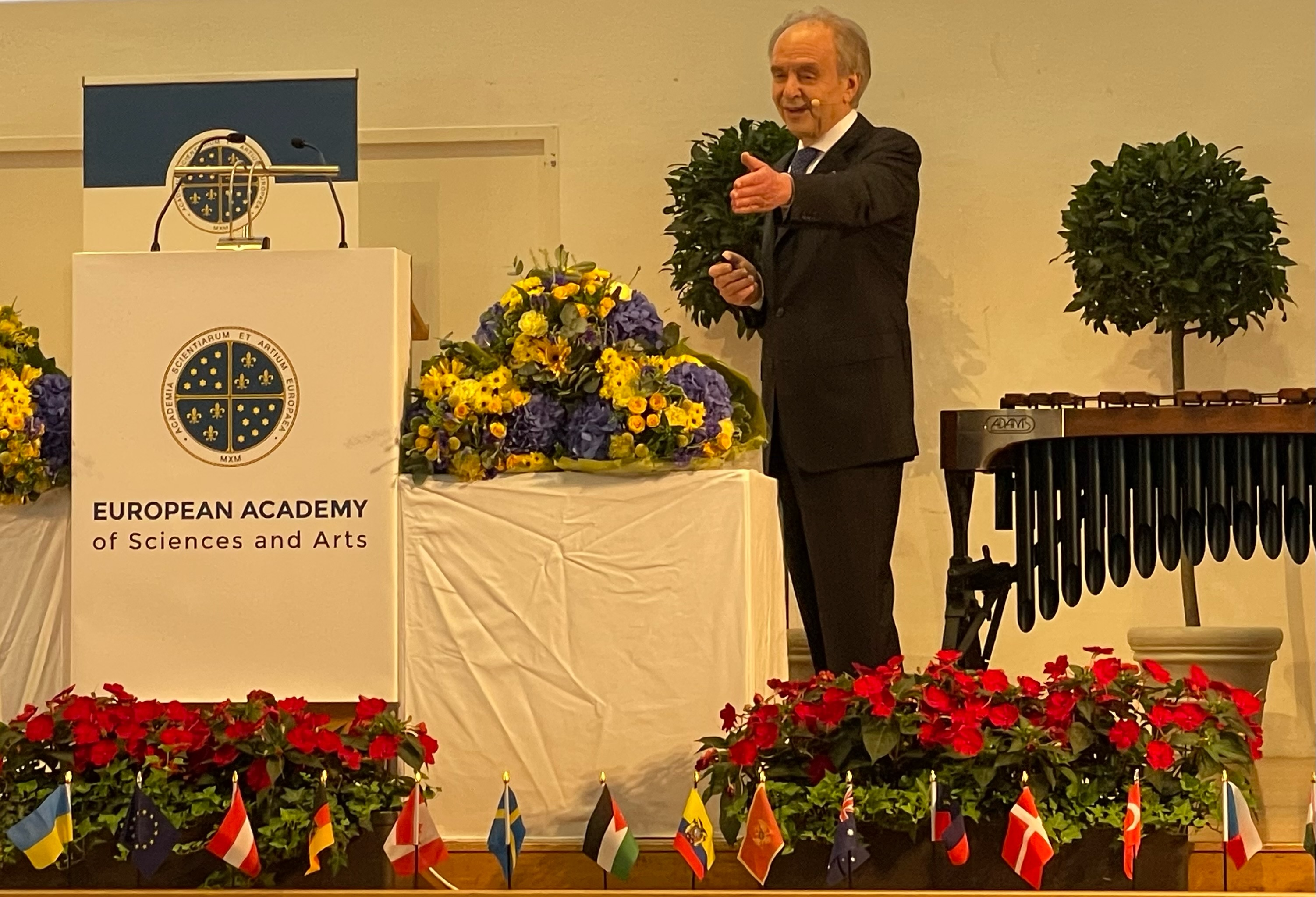
Mainzer speaking at the European Academy of Sciences and Arts 2022 General Assembly

Klaus Mainzer initially published on the concept of a number, the fundamentals of geometry, space, time, symmetry and quantum mechanics. He became known as a fundamental theorist of complex systems and artificial intelligence (AI), who considers their social consequences in the age of digitization. He was the first who examined mathematical models of complex systems (e.g., cellular automatons and neural networks) that organize themselves in nature - from molecular and cellular systems to organisms and brains. With Leon O. Chua of University of California, Berkeley, he pointed out that the non-linearity and instability are insufficient to explain new structures (emergence). The prerequisite is the principle of local activity, which mathematically explains the emergence of complex structures on the edge of chaos.

In basic mathematical research, he began studying constructive mathematics against the background of Kant's philosophy. Based on degrees of predictability and constructiveness, he researched the extent to which mathematical proofs - and thus human thinking - can be reduced to algorithms and computers. The world's calculation leads again to complex systems and the question of the degree to which they can be digitized (e.g., as quantum information systems).

In the technical sciences, Mainzer advocates increased basic research into verification programs to overcome the blind spots of statistical learning algorithms (machine learning) in AI. Complex Systems in the Internet of Things (e.g., Smart Mobility, Industry 4.0) lead to a data explosion (Big Data), which raises security and responsibility issues. In addition to program verification, Mainzer demands technology design that takes social, ecological, ethical and legal aspects into account in the innovation from the outset. In the global competition of world systems, he calls for the European innovation area to reflect on its legacy of individual human rights and to develop artificial intelligence as a service system further.

In November 2020, the European Academy of Sciences and Arts elected Mainzer as its new president. He succeeded Felix Unger, who had served as president for three decades.

== Publications ==
- Geschichte der Geometrie. B.I. Wissenschaftsverlag, 1980, ISBN 3-411-01575-6.
- Grundlagenprobleme in der Geschichte der exakten Wissenschaften. Universitätsverlag Konstanz, 1981, ISBN 3-87940-202-7.
- Symmetrien der Natur. de Gruyter, 1988. (1996, ISBN 3-11-011507-7), Englische Übersetzung 1996, ISBN 3-11-012990-6.
- Thinking in Complexity. Springer, 1994, 5. Edition 2007, ISBN 978-3-540-72227-4, japanische Übersetzung der 1. Auflage 1997, ISBN 4-431-70734-4, chinesische Übersetzung der 2. Auflage 1999, ISBN 7-80109-329-1 und der 4. erweiterten Auflage 2012, polnische Übersetzung der 4. Auflage 2007, ISBN 978-83-227-2707-2, russische Übersetzung der 4. Auflage 2008, ISBN 978-5-397-00002-4
- Computer – neue Flügel des Geistes? de Gruyter, 1994. (2. Edition 1995, ISBN 3-11-014808-0)
- Zeit – von der Urzeit zur Computerzeit. C.H. Beck, 1995. (5. Auflage 2005, ISBN 3-406-44911-5, englische Übersetzung der 4. Auflage unter dem Titel "The Little Book of Time" 2002, ISBN 1-4757-4332-7, koreanische Übersetzung der 4. Auflage 2005, ISBN 89-7527-460-8)
- Materie – von der Urmaterie zum Leben. C.H. Beck, 1996, ISBN 3-406-40334-4. (chinesische Übersetzung 2001, ISBN 7-5357-3197-X)
- Gehirn, Computer, Komplexität. Springer, 1997, ISBN 3-540-61598-9.
- Computernetze und virtuelle Realität. Springer, 1999, ISBN 3-540-65465-8.
- Causality in Natural, Technical, and Social Systems, in: European Review (Academia Europaea/Cambridge University Press), Vol. 18, No. 4, 2010, 433-454;http://journals.cambridge.org/repo_A78lJAIv
- KI – Künstliche Intelligenz. Grundlagen intelligenter Systeme. Wissenschaftliche Buchgesellschaft, 2003, ISBN 3-89678-454-4.
- Computerphilosophie – zur Einführung. Junius Verlag, 2003, ISBN 3-88506-383-2.
- Symmetry and Complexity – the Spirit and Beauty of Nonlinear Science. World Scientific Singapore, 2005, ISBN 981-256-192-7.
- Der kreative Zufall – wie das Neue in die Welt kommt. C.H. Beck, 2007, ISBN 978-3-406-55428-5.
- Komplexität. UTB, 2008, ISBN 978-3-8252-3012-8.
- Leben als Maschine? Von der Systembiologie zu Robotik und Künstlichen Intelligenz. Mentis Verlag, 2010, ISBN 978-3-89785-714-8.k
- The Cause of Complexity in Nature: An Analytical and Computational Approach, in: The Cause of Complexity in Nature: An Analytical and Computational Approach, in: I. Zelinka et al. (eds.), How Nature Works. Complexity in Interdiscipinary Research and Applications, Springer International Publishing: Cham et al. 2013, 19-49.
- Die Berechnung der Welt – von der Weltformel zu Big Data. C.H. Beck, 2014, ISBN 978-3-406-66130-3.
- Künstliche Intelligenz: Wann übernehmen die Maschinen? Springer, 2016, ISBN 978-3-662-48452-4. (2., erweiterte Auflage 2019, ISBN 978-3-662-58045-5)
- Information: Algorithmus-Wahrscheinlichkeit-Komplexität-Quantenmechanik-Leben-Gehirn-Gesellschaft. Berlin University Press, 2016, ISBN 978-3-7374-1322-0.
- The Digital and the Real World. Computational Foundations of Mathematics, Science, Technology, and Philosophy. World Scientific Singapore, 2018.
- Wie berechenbar ist unsere Welt? Herausforderungen für Mathematik, Informatik und Philosophie im Zeitalter der Digitalisierung. (= Essentials). Springer, 2018, ISBN 978-3-658-21297-1.
- Quantencomputer. Von der Quantenwelt zur Künstlichen Intelligenz. Springer, 2021, ISBN 978-3-662-61997-1
- Artificial Intelligence. When do machines take over? (English translation: Springer 2019, ISBN 978-3-662-59716-3, Chinese translation: Tsinghua University Press 2022, ISBN 978-7-302-59257-0.
- Zukunft durch nachhaltige Innovation im Wettbewerb der Systeme. Springer 2023.ISBN 978-3-662-66325-7.
- ChatGPT and Artificial Intelligence: From Foundations to Applications in Education (Chinese), in: Peking University Education Review. General No. 81 No.1 2023, 35-48. ISSN 1671-9468.
- The emergence of symmetries in classical physics, in: Journal of Physics: Conference Series HAPP Centre: 10th Anniversary Commemorative Volume 2877 012100 2024 Oxford. doi:10.1088/1742-6596/2877/1/012100.
- Artificial Intelligence of Neuromorphic Systems. From Digital, Analogue, Quantum, and Brain-Oriented Computing to Hybrid AI. World Scientific: Singapore 2024. ISBN 978-981-12-9007-7.

Klaus Mainzer is (co)editor or (co)author of the following publications:

- Zahlen. Grundwissen Mathematik. 1. Auflage. Springer, 1983. (3. Auflage. 1991, ISBN 3-540-97497-0, englische Übersetzung der 3. Auflage 1991, ISBN 0-387-97497-0, japanische Übersetzung 1991, ISBN 4-431-70602-X, französische Übersetzung 1999, ISBN 2-7117-8901-2)
- Philosophie und Physik der Raum-Zeit. B.I. Wissenschaftsverlag 1988. (2., durchges. Auflage 1994, ISBN 3-411-17072-7)
- Vom Anfang der Welt: Wissenschaft, Philosophie, Religion, Mythos. C.H. Beck 1989. (2. Auflage 1990, ISBN 3-406-33925-5)
- Wieviele Leben hat Schrödingers Katze? Zur Physik und Philosophie der Quantenmechanik. B.I. Wissenschaftsverlag 1990. (Nachdruck: Spektrum Akademischer Verlag, 1996, ISBN 3-411-14281-2)
- Die Frage nach dem Leben. Piper, 1990, ISBN 3-492-11119-X.
- Natur- und Geisteswissenschaften. Springer, 1990, ISBN 3-540-52377-4.
- Ökonomie und Ökologie unter besonderer Berücksichtigung der Alpenregion / Economie et Ecologie dans le Contexte de l’Arc Alpin. Haupt Verlag, 1993, ISBN 3-258-04692-1.
- Quanten, Chaos und Dämonen. Erkenntnistheoretische Aspekte der modernen Physik. B.I. Wissenschaftsverlag, 1994, ISBN 3-411-16301-1.
- From Simplicity to Complexity II. Information, Interaction, Emergence. Vieweg, 1998, ISBN 3-528-06757-8.
- Komplexe Systeme und Nichtlineare Dynamik in Natur und Gesellschaft. Komplexitätsforschung in Deutschland auf dem Weg ins nächste Jahrhundert. Springer, 1999, ISBN 3-540-65329-5.
- The Universe as Automaton. From Simplicity and Symmetry to Complexity. Springer, 2010, ISBN 978-3-642-23476-7.
- Local Activity Principle. The Cause of Complexity and Symmetry Breaking. Imperial College Press, 2013, ISBN 978-1-908977-09-0.
- Proof and Computation. Digitization in Mathematics, Computer Science, and Philosophy. World Scientific Singapore, 2018, ISBN 978-981-3270-93-0.
- Proof and Computation II. From Proof Theory and Univalent Mathematics to Program Extraction and Verification. World Scientific: Singapore 2022. ISBN 978-981-123-647-1.
- Temporal Logic. From Philosophy and Proof Theory to Artificial Intelligence and Quantum Computing. World Scientific: Singapore 2023. ISBN 978-981-126-853-3.
- Limits of AI - theoretical, practical, ethical, Springer 2024 (German: Springer 2022). ISBN 978-3-662-68289-0.
- Philosophisches Handbuch Künstliche Intelligenz. Springer 2024. ISBN 978-3-658-19605-9.
