= Alexander von Gabain =

German microbiologist

Alexander von Gabain is a microbiologist, academic, founder of several biotech firms and board member of venture capital firms. He has worked at the intersection of the healthcare industry, academia and research throughout his career. He was one of the founding board members of EIT in 2008 and began his involvement in EIT Health in 2015.

His passion for biomedical research and innovation, particularly in the fields of microbiology, immunology and vaccines, has been well-documented through numerous publications; and his achievements in these fields have been well-recognised through industrial awards, academic prizes and honourable memberships.

== Academic background ==
von Gabain obtained his PhD in Genetics at the University of Heidelberg and held a post-doctorate position at Stanford University from 1979 to 1982.

In the 1980s and 1990s, he was Professor at the University of Umeå and at the Karolinska Institute in Stockholm, Sweden, as well as an advisor to pharmaceutical and biotech companies. From 1993 to 1999, he was chair of Microbiology of the University of Vienna and engaged in building the public-private partnership between the Vienna-based universities and Boehringer Ingelheim known as Vienna Biocenter.

His current academic appointments include as a member of the Scientific Advisory Board of the Paul Ehrlich Institute, a member of the Board of Trustees of the Institute of Science and Technology Austria (ISTA), a member of the Royal Swedish Academy of Engineering Sciences and a Professor Emeritus for Microbiology at the Max F. Perutz Laboratories, a center established by the University of Vienna and the Medical University of Vienna. He also serves as Vice-President Emeritus at the Karolinska Institute in Stockholm, having served as Deputy Vice-Chancellor for Innovation and Commercial Outreach between 2014 and 2017.

== Intercell and other innovation work ==
von Gabain co-founded Intercell AG in 1998, led the company until it was successfully floated on the Vienna Stock Exchange in 2005^{[}^{1]} and continued as Chief Scientific Officer in the Executive Board until 2009. In 2011, he was appointed to the company's Supervisory Board and continues to hold this position after it Intercell and Vivalis merged into the trans-European biotech enterprise, Valneva, listed on Euronext Paris since 2013 and on Nasdaq since 2021. Valneva has today two global vaccines on the market, more than 600 employees and three major vaccines in late clinical development.

Additionally, he has supported other biotech enterprises and related VC firms in various functions. His entrepreneurial and scientific knowledge in the innovation arena has been highly sought after by organisations fostering entrepreneurial innovation. Between 2007 and 2019, he was Chair of INiTS, the technology seed fund and incubator of the University of Vienna and the Technical University of Vienna, initiating more than 300 start-ups and ranking amongst the top ten of university incubators globally. He is currently a member of the Supervisory Board of Eveliqure- an innovative biotech company developing novel vaccines for the prevention of diarrhoeal disease, a member of the Supervisory Board of Biocopy- whose patented biomolecule copier is used for the production and replication of all kinds of different microarrays.

== EIT and EIT Health ==
In 2008, he was appointed as a founding member of the Governing Board of the European Institute of Innovation and Technology (EIT) and in 2011 was elected to become its Chairman for a period ending in 2014. During this time, the first three of EIT's Knowledge and Innovation Communities (KICs) were established and EIT evolved into a multi-billion dollar organisation.

In 2015, he joined the Supervisory Board of EIT Health - an innovation consortium with more than 150 leading organisations and institutions from the European healthcare space. In 2017, he was appointed Chair of the organisations Supervisory Board, a position he held until 2021.
