= European Academy of Sciences and Arts =

International NGO in Salzburg, Austria

- Europäische Akademie der Wissenschaften und Künste (German); Academia Scientiarum et Artium Europaea (Latin)
- Formation: 1990
- Purpose: Fundamental and applied research contributing to the development of European scientific and technical potential, culture, education, literature, and arts.
- Headquarters: Salzburg
- Location: Salzburg, Austria
- Website: euro-acad.eu

The European Academy of Sciences and Arts (EASA, Latin: Academia Scientiarum et Artium Europaea) is a transnational and interdisciplinary network, connecting about 2,000 recommended scientists and artists worldwide, including 37 Nobel Prize laureates. The European Academy of Sciences and Arts is a learned society of scientists and artists, founded by Felix Unger. The academy was founded 1990, is situated in Salzburg and has been supported by the city of Vienna, the government of Austria, and the European Commission. The EASA is now headed by President Klaus Mainzer, TUM Emeritus of Excellence at the Technical University of Munich and Senior Professor at the Carl Friedrich von Weizsäcker Center of the University of Tübingen.

It is unrelated to and should not be confused with the Belgium-based European Academy of Sciences (EURASC).

It is a member of the InterAcademy Partnership. Its activities have included a collaboration with the Latvian Academy of Sciences: the European-Latvian Institute for Cultural and Scientific Exchange (EUROLAT), founded in 1993.

== History ==
The origins date back to a scientific working group with the Salzburg cardiac surgeon Felix Unger, the archbishop from Vienna Franz König and the political scientist and philosopher Nikolaus Lobkowicz. On 7 March 1990, the academy was officially founded in Salzburg, where the academy is still located today.

The Festive Plenary of the European Academy of Sciences and Arts takes place annually with the festive admission of new members in Salzburg. On the occasion of the 25th- and 30th- anniversary the celebrations took place with the Federal Presidents of Austria and other Presidents of European countries. Other Protectors (national patrons) of the academy are King Philippe of Belgium, Borut Pahor (State President of Slovenia), Gjorge Ivanov (State President of Macedonia) and since 12 June 2018 Austrian Federal President Alexander Van der Bellen. Past Protectors include the former EU Commission President and Prime Minister of Luxembourg Jacques Santer, the former King of Spain Juan Carlos I, and the former EU Commission President and Italian Prime Minister Romano Prodi.

== Vision and membership ==
The European Academy of Sciences and Arts is politically independent and financed by donations, private sponsors and public institutions. The activities of the academy do not aim at financial profit. The academy is a forum of scholars who take up interdisciplinarily and transdisciplinarily scientific topics with societal impact. Since 2020, the academy had circa 2000 academicians worldwide. These are respected and recommended scientists and artists, among them 38 Nobel Prize Laureates. New members are considered following nominations from existing members. The Senate decides on admission on the basis of recommendations of the nomination commission. The membership is considered as distinction of the merits in science and society. Members are entitled to use the postnominal, MEASA. Famous members of the EASA include the economist Hans-Werner Sinn, Michail Gorbatschow (Nobel Peace Prize), the artist Jenny Holzer, and Pope em. Benedict XVI. Current members who are Nobel Prize Laureates are as follows.

- Zhores I. Alferov, Physics 2000
- Werner Arber, Physiology or Medicine 1978
- Gerd Binnig, Physics 1986
- Emmanuelle Charpentier, Chemistry 2020
- Aaron Ciechanover, Chemistry 2004
- Paul J. Crutzen, Chemistry 1995
- François Englert, Physics 2013
- Gerhard Ertl, Chemistry 2007
- Andre Geim, Physics 2010
- Mikhail Gorbachev, Peace 1990
- Peter Grünberg, Physics 2007
- Theodor W. Hänsch, Physics 2005
- Peter Higgs, Physics 2013
- Jules A. Hoffmann, Physiology or Medicine 2011
- Harald zur Hausen, Physiology or Medicine 2008
- Klaus Hasselmann, Physics 2021
- Robert Huber, Chemistry 1988
- Tim Hunt, Physiology or Medicine 2001
- Eric Kandel, Physiology or Medicine 2000
- Wolfgang Ketterle, Physics 2001
- Ferenc Krausz, Physics 2023
- Bernard Lown, Peace 1985
- Luc Montagnier, Physiology or Medicine 2008
- May-Britt Moser, Physiology or Medicine 2014
- Erwin Neher, Physiology or Medicine 1991
- Konstantin Novoselov, Physics 2010
- Ryōji Noyori, Chemistry 2001
- Sir Paul Nurse, Physiology or Medicine 2001
- Edmund S. Phelps, Economics 2006
- John C. Polanyi, Chemistry 1986
- Brian P. Schmidt, Physics 2011
- Dan Shechtman, Chemistry 2011
- Joseph E. Stiglitz, Economics 2002
- Fraser Stoddart, Chemistry 2016
- Thomas Südhof, Physiology or Medicine 2013
- Torsten N. Wiesel, Physiology or Medicine 1981
- Kurt Wüthrich, Chemistry 2002
- Anton Zeilinger, Physics 2022

== Academicians ==
A full list of academicians of the European Academy of Sciences and Arts are accessible here.

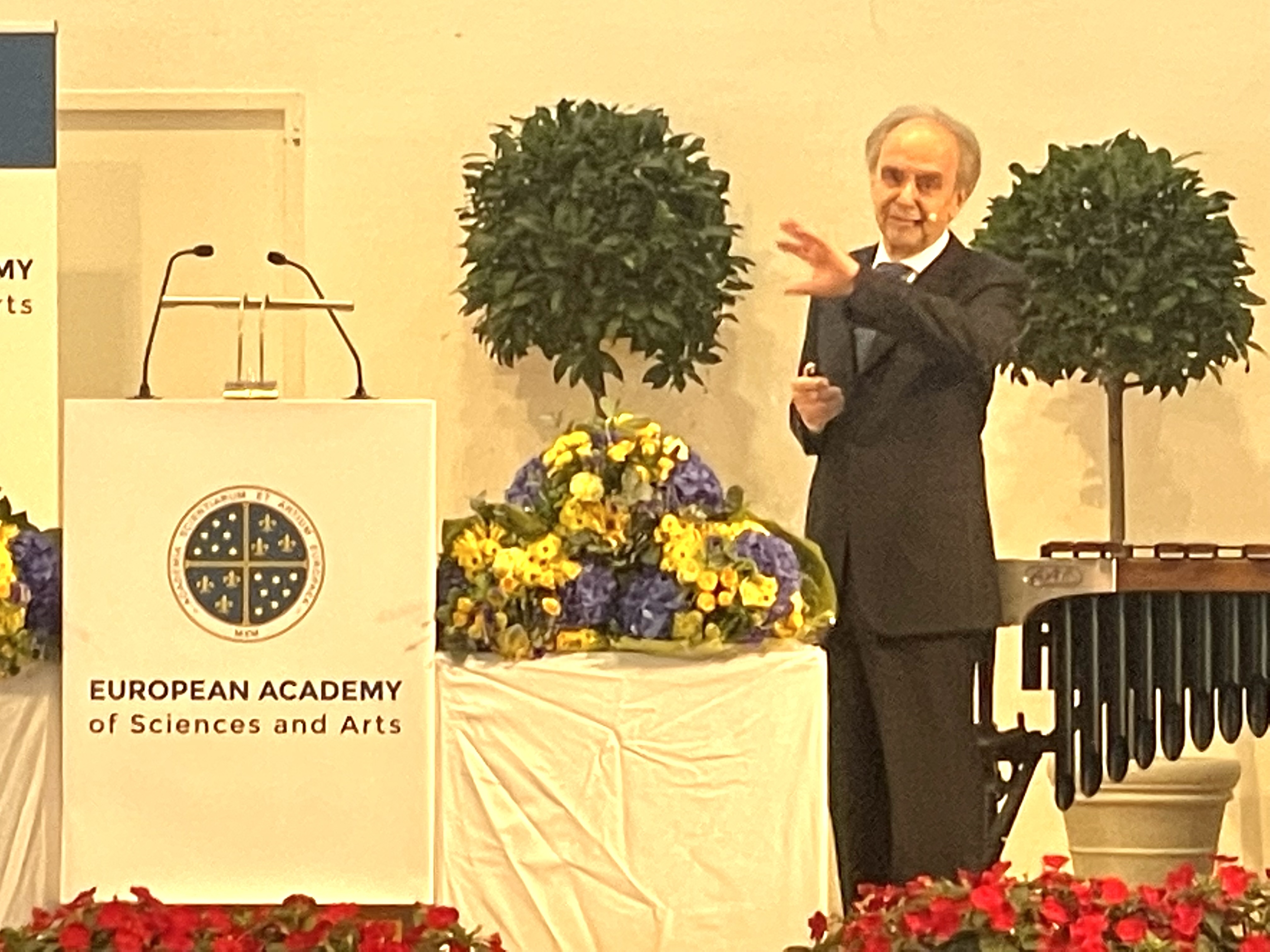
The European Academy of Sciences and Arts president Klaus Mainzer addressing the academy in 2022

== Organisation ==
The academy is a non-profit association according to the Austrian Association. The current President of the academy is Klaus Mainzer who in 2020 followed the Founding President Felix Unger. The Vice presidents are Kristin De Troyer, Ioannis Liritzis, and Verica Trstenjak.

Members of the academy come from 73 countries and are divided into seven classes:

- Class I: Humanities – Dean: Boštjan Marko Turk
- Class II: Medicine – Dean: Dusan Suput
- Class III: Arts – Dean: Elisabeth Gutjahr
- Class IV: Natural Sciences – Dean: Monica Riva
- Class V: Social Sciences, Law, and Economics – Dean: Alberto De Franceschi
- Class VI: Technology and Environmental Sciences – Dean: Athanasios Vasilakos
- Class VII: World Religions – Dean: Paul van Geest

== Prize of Tolerance ==
Since 1997 the European Academy of Sciences and Arts has awarded the Prize of Tolerance to acknowledge the engagement for humanity and tolerance. Guided by the targets of the Charter of Tolerance, this prize is awarded to persons or institutions which actively engage for tolerance and humanness, but also for cross-border dialogue and against racism.

The previous award winners are:

- 1997 Teddy Kollek
- 1998 Suzanne Mubarak
- 1999 Franz Kardinal König
- 2000 Astrid N. Heiberg
- 2002 Dorothea Rosenblad
- 2003 Djibrail Kassab
- 2004 Daniel Barenboim
- 2005 Giandomenico Picco
- 2006 Hans-Dietrich Genscher
- 2007 Flavio Cotti
- 2008 Eugen Biser
- 2009 Klaus Töpfer
- 2010 Karl Kardinal Lehmann
- 2011 Daniel Barenboim
- 2013 Pedro Opeka
- 2015 Internationales Olympisches Komitee
- 2016 Roland Riz
- 2018 Marko Feingold
- 2019 Hans Peter Haselsteiner
- 2023 Felix Unger
- 2024 Harald Wögerbauer

== Rings of Tolerance ==
Prize award of the Rings of Tolerance in the City Hall of Cologne Since 2012, the academy annually awards the Rings of Tolerance to members of the three religions of Abraham according to Lessing's Parable of the Ring, in order to support justice and tolerance between Christianity, Judaism, and Islam.

The previous award winners are:

- 2012 Lord George Weidenfeld, Karl Cardinal Lehmann and Zaki Anwar Nusseibeh
- 2013 Evelyn de Rothschild, Friede Springer and Nemir Kirdar
- 2014 André Azoulay (Adviser of King Mohammed VI of Morocco), Hubert Burda and Prince Hassan of Jordan
- 2015 Xavier Guerrand-Hermès, Farah Pandith, Baron Harry Woolf
- 2016 Péter Cardinal Erdő, Uri Lubrani, Ismail Serageldin
- 2017 Avishay Braverman, Rabeya Müller, Mitri Raheb
- 2018 Katajun Amirpur, Esther Bejarano, Doris Leuthard
- 2019 Mouhanad Khorchide, Jan Assmann, Aleida Assmann
- 2021 Walter Homolka, Andrea Riccardi, Edmond Brahimaj
- 2022 Karl Josef Kuschel, İhsan Eliaçik, Lala Süßkind
