= Vili Kovačič =

Slovenian activist

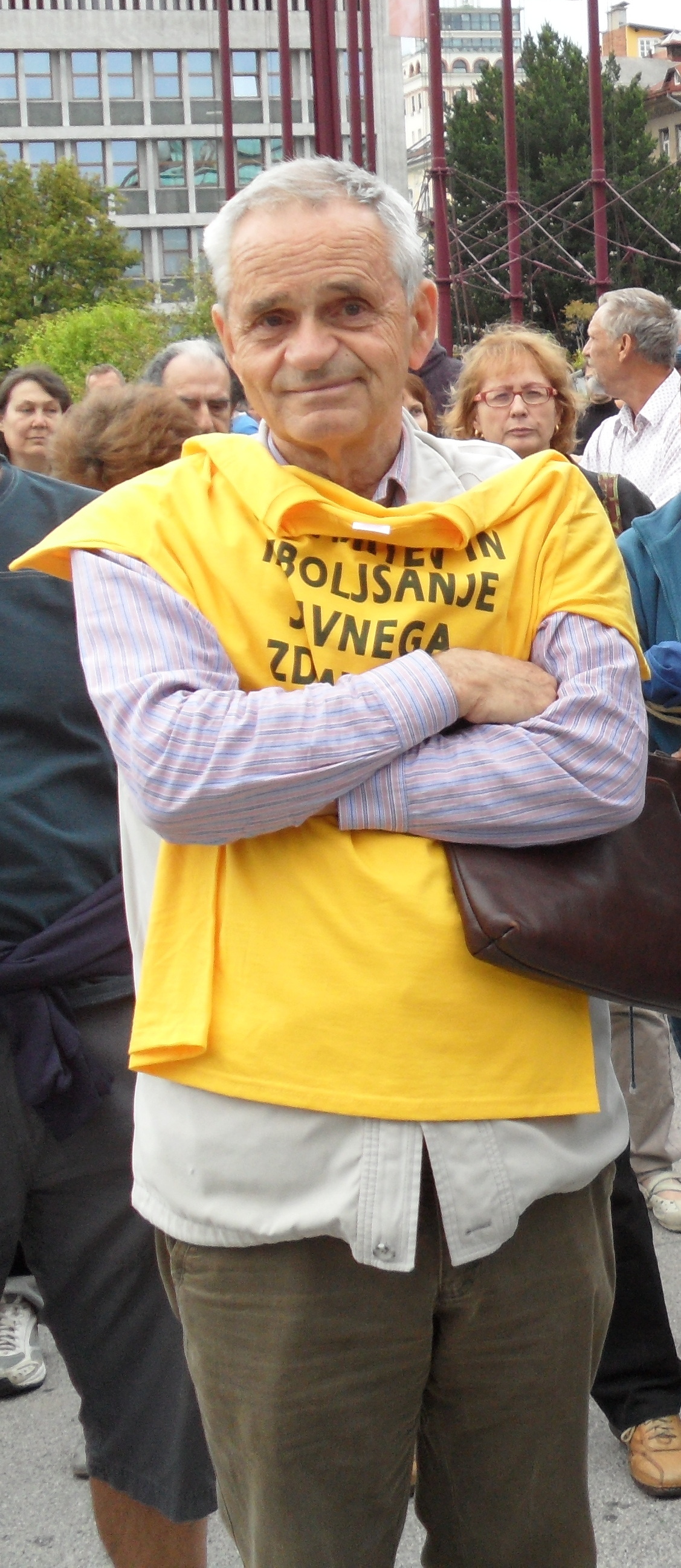
Kovačič attending a protest

Vili Kovačič (born 1941) is a Slovenian impact litigation activist and blogger, who was the first in Europe to successfully challenge a referendum result based on a campaign finance violation. His challenge resulted in the resignation of Prime Minister Miro Cerar and early parliamentary elections in 2018. His successful challenges to elections and referendums resulted in Constitutional Court reforming Slovenian electoral laws and practices.

== Anti-corruption and anti-communist activities 1960–2015 ==
Vili Kovačič was active in student movements in the 1960s. In 1963 he co-organized the student movement for students' social equality at the University of Ljubljana, which in 1964, together with Perspektive magazine and Jože Pučnik led to a broader student movement. Communist authorities abolished Perspektive magazine.

In 2012, Kovačič founded an anti-corruption non-governmental organization called We Taxpayers Never Give Up (Davkoplačevalci se ne damo). One of its first projects was an attempt to block the Teš 6, one of the largest energy infrastructure projects in the country. Kovačič claimed that it would be financially flawed and it would mainly serve corruption purposes. Kovačič collected enough signatures to trigger a national referendum on the project, but the Constitutional Court blocked the referendum claiming that some signatures were ineligible or the names were not written exactly as they appeared in the official government's databases (Constitutional Court of Slovenia number U-I-268/12). Most political parties and media disregarded his claims that Teš 6 would serve corruption purposes. Several years later, police found 3.3 million Euros of cash in the Teš 6 director Uroš Rotnik's safe, which led to a discovery of a large corruption scheme and Rotnik's conviction in 2019 and 2020.

His other projects were the removal of the statue of the communist leader Boris Kidrič from the Council of Europe Park in Ljubljana, and a call for electoral system change in 2014. He was active in protests at the Supreme Court of Slovenia in 2014, in collecting signatures on the Family Code referendum, and at the murder trial of dr. Milko Novic, who was accused of killing dr. Jamnik, the director of the Chemical Institute of Ljubljana, where the daughter of Boris Kidric is employed.

== 2017 railway referendum legal challenge ==
In 2017, Kovačič collected 4500 signatures and triggered a referendum procedure on a railway project between Divača and Koper, called "Drugi tir". and in the second stage of the procedure he collected over 48,000 notarised signatures, which resulted in a referendum. The National Assembly called a referendum on 24 September 2017, and Kovačič challenged the choice of the date at the Constitutional Court, arguing that for financial reasons and for the facilitation of voting the referendum should be held together with presidential elections, which were scheduled in October 2017. The Constitutional Court rejected his appeal by seven votes to two.

In August 2017 he appealed to the Constitutional Court claiming that the Government of Slovenia violates Council of Europe rules on referendum financing established by the Code of Good Practices in Referendum Matters. He argued that the government should not be allowed to spend state budget funds only for the "yes" vote and not for the "no" vote. The Constitutional Court ruled that Kovačič should first challenge the referendum results at the Supreme Court and then return to the Constitutional Court if unsuccessful.

In the referendum held in September 2017, 53.5 percent of the voters backed the railway construction. Kovačič challenged the referendum results at the Supreme Court, but the Supreme Court paused the proceedings and sent the case to the Constitutional Court. In January 2018 the Constitutional Court annulled some parts of the referendum legislation and ordered the Supreme Court to assess the severity of the referendum rules' violations, and if these violations could affect the referendum outcome, to annul the referendum results. Professor Jurij Toplak wrote appeals to the Constitutional Court and to the Supreme Court for Kovačič.

On 14 March 2018, the Supreme Court held its first public hearing since the independence of Slovenia, and Kovačič questioned prime minister Miro Cerar as a witness. On the same day, the Supreme Court annulled the referendum results and a few hours later, the prime minister Cerar resigned.

== 2018 local elections legal challenge ==
In 2018, Kovačič challenged local elections results in Ljubljana due to alleged campaign finance and electoral corruption violations by mayor Zoran Janković. He requested a public hearing at the Administrative Court, but the court rejected his appeal without holding a hearing. Kovačič appealed to the Constitutional Court and succeeded. In June 2019, the court ruled that the Administrative Court violated Kovačič's rights by not holding a hearing. It ordered that within 30 days, the Administrative Court had to hold a public hearing and if violations are found, the composition of the city council should be changed or new elections should be held.

As of April 2022, the Administrative Court still had not held a public hearing and Kovačič informed international organisations about alleged violations of international electoral norms. On October 11, 2019, Kovačič informed OSCE, ODIHR, the Council of Europe, the Venice Commission, and the Group of States Against Corruption (GRECO) about the judicial delay and alleged judicial misconduct, and asked them to intervene or assist. Between 2019 and 2022, he numerous times publicly called the court to hold the hearing. In late 2021, the court announced that it would hold a hearing but only eight people could attend it in person, and ten online. Kovačič protested that the online stream should be opened for more audience, and the court cancelled the hearing.

== Insulting a judge ==
During Milko Novič's highly publicised Jamnik murder trial, in 2017, Kovačič publicly called judge Špela Koleta a "sow". He later asserted that this was not meant as a personal insult, but as a reference to George Orwell's Animal Farm, in which pigs represent authoritarian rulers abusing their power. Koleta sentenced Novič to 25 years imprisonment, but the Supreme Court overturned the conviction. In two retrials, Novič was found innocent.

Judge Koleta pressed criminal charges. Kovačič was convicted in 2018, and fined 1260 Euros. Kovačič refused to pay the fine himself, and made a public appeal for donations. Kovačič also appealed, asserting his freedom of expression. In December 2021, the Supreme Court vacated the fine and instead issued Kovačič a warning.

== 2022 petition to ban communist parties ==
After the European Court of Human Rights in December 2021 ruled that Romania's ban on the Communist Party had been in line with the European Convention of Human Rights and "necessary for the democratic society", in January 2022, Kovačič asked the Constitutional Court of Slovenia to ban two parliamentary parties by applying the European Court's standards, and standards set by the 1952 German Constitutional Court's prohibition of the German communist party. Kovačič claimed that SD, a party which is the legal successor of the former Communist Party, and the party Left, were unconstitutional. In March 2022, the Constitutional Court rejected Kovačič's petition, saying it had no grounds.

Kovačič informs the public about his activities in his online blog drzavljank.si. He or the We Taxpayers Never Give up association regularly inform international organisations about corruption issues in Slovenia. According to his wife, they constantly receive threats and insults by phone and mail.
