= Jadranka Sovdat =

Slovenian lawyer (born 1960)

10th President of the Constitutional Court of Slovenia
- In office 31 October 2016 – 18 December 2018
- Preceded by: Miroslav Mozetič
- Succeeded by: Rajko Knez

9th Vice-President of the Constitutional Court of Slovenia
- In office 11 November 2013 – 30 October 2016
- Preceded by: Miroslav Mozetič
- Succeeded by: Etelka Korpič-Horvat

Judge of the Constitutional Court of Slovenia
- In office 19 December 2009 – 18 December 2018
- Preceded by: Ciril Ribičič
- Succeeded by: Katja Šugman Stubbs

3rd Secretary-General of the Constitutional Court of Slovenia
- In office 29 January 1999 – 18 December 2009
- Preceded by: Janez Čebulj
- Succeeded by: Erik Kerševan

Personal details
- Born: 28 April 1960 (age 66) Ljubljana
- Citizenship: Slovenia
- Education: University of Ljubljana
- Occupation: Lawyer

Jadranka Sovdat (born 28 April 1960, Ljubljana), is a Slovenian lawyer, professor and former judge of the Constitutional Court of Slovenia.

She served as Secretary-General (1999–2009), Vice-President (2013–2016) and President of the Constitutional Court of Slovenia (2016–2018).

In 1982, she graduated from the Faculty of Law in Ljubljana and passed the bar exam in 1984. She took up employment at the Ministry of Justice. Among other things, she is the co-author of the legislation on the legal profession, court organization and judicial service, the state prosecutorial service, and administrative disputes that were drafted in the first years following the implementation of the new constitutional order. During her final year at the Ministry of Justice, she also headed the Justice Sector, which at the time oversaw both the legislative drafting work and tasks related to judicial administration and the financing of judicial bodies.

She started working at the Constitutional Court as an adviser in 1994. In 1999, she was appointed Secretary-General and served in this position until 2009, when she was elected judge of the Constitutional Court of Slovenia. She is the only woman who has served as Secretary-General, Vice-President, and President of the Court.
