= Accetto =

Accetto is a surname of Italian origin. Notable people with the surname include:

- Bojan Accetto (1922–2007), Slovenian physician
- Matej Accetto, Slovenian judge
- Torquato Accetto (1590/98–1640), Italian writer

== See also ==
- Accettola, surname
