= Matej Accetto =

Slovenian judge

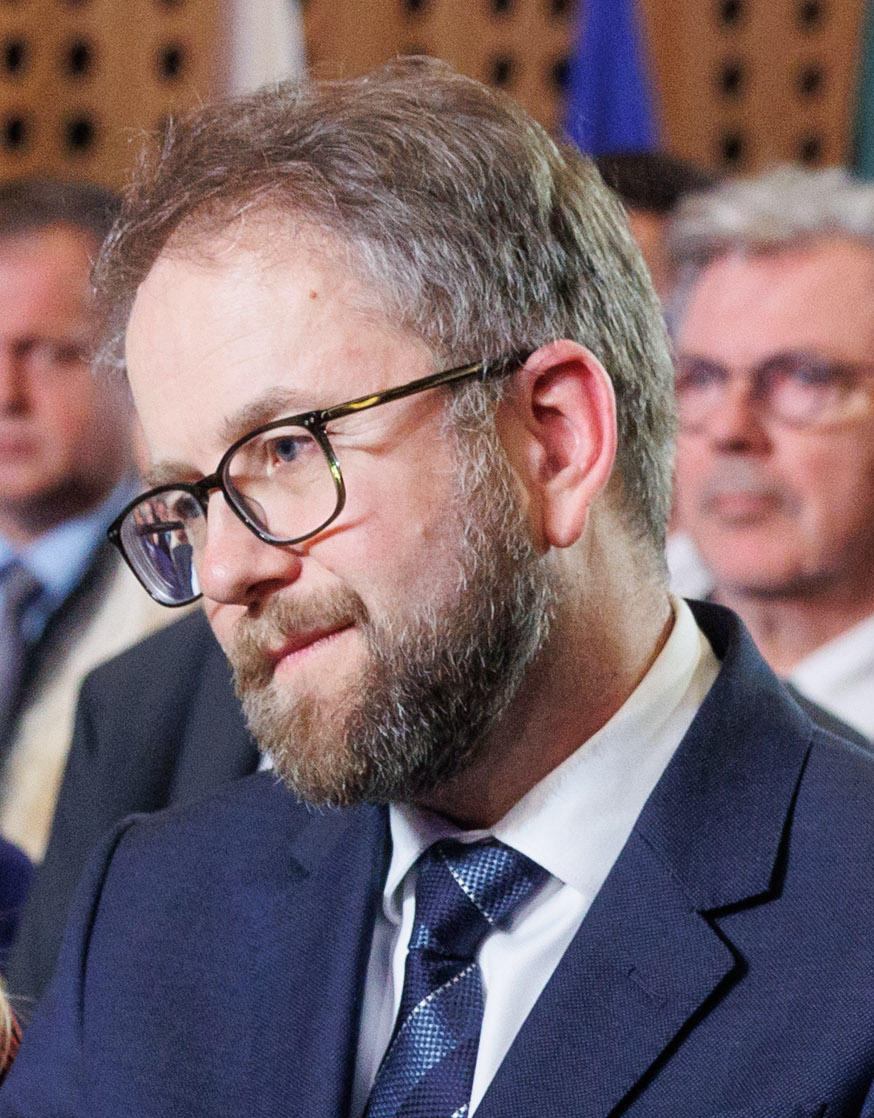
Matej Accetto

Matej Accetto is a Slovenian judge and president of the Constitutional Court of Slovenia.

== Education ==
Accetto graduated from the University of Ljubljana Faculty of Law in 2000 and received an LL.M. degree from Harvard University in 2001. He completed this Ph.D. degree at the University of Ljubljana Faculty of Law. Since then, he was employed at the same institution. Currently he is an Associate Professor of European law. He was ranked 24th on the list of Slovenian law professors based on the number of citations in the academic literature, published in January 2018.

== Career ==
Accetto was appointed a member of the Constitutional Court in March 2017, and became its vice president in September 2019.

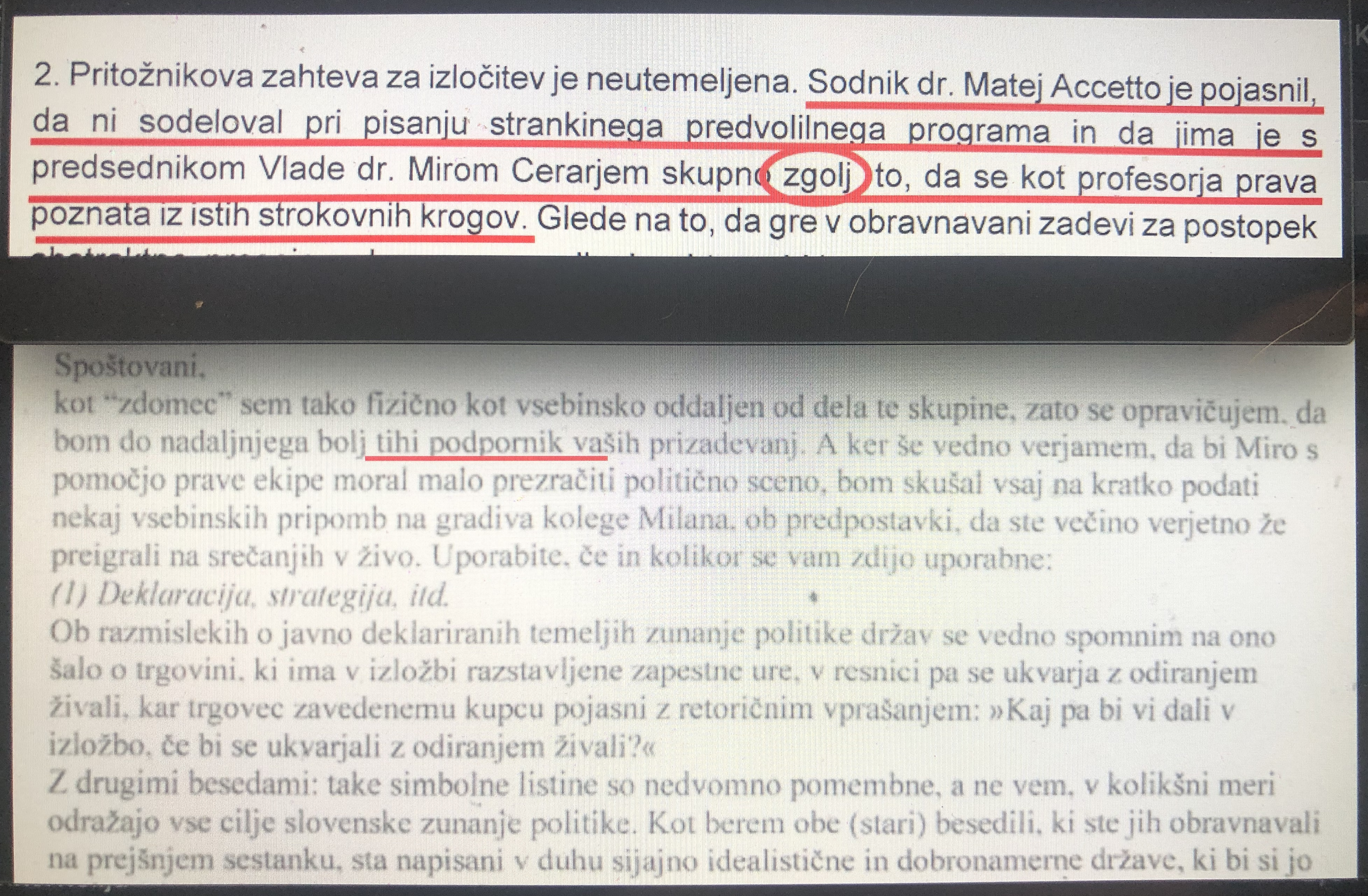
Above: The 2018 Constitutional Court decision, in which Accetto explains that he had not participated in Cerar's political party agenda, and that he only vaguely knew Cerar. Below: Excerpt from one of the 2014 emails by Accetto, revealed in 2019, showing his active involvement in party's agenda development, and his suggestion that he would serve as a "silent supporter".

Accetto was appointed to the Constitutional Court based on the "explicit request by Prime Minister Miro Cerar" who taught at the same faculty of law. In two separate procedures at the Constitutional Court, an activist Vili Kovačič challenged decisions of Cerar and his government. Kovačič asked Accetto to recuse himself, or that the court should recuse him, because he had actively participated in the formation of Cerar's political party, and had contributed in writing of the party's agenda before the party was formally established. Accetto explained that he had never participated in any such activity, and that besides professional academical engagement he had no connections to Cerar or his political party. The Constitutional Court published Accetto's statements in two separate decisions, and based on these statements the court let Accetto be a judge on these cases. His judgment in both decisions was against the position of the government led by Miro Cerar and his political party. On October 14, 2019, in the morning, a website Pozareport.si published scanned copies of email correspondence between Accetto, Cerar, and some other founders of Cerar's political party. In these emails, Accetto extensively suggests political agenda for Cerar's party, and states that he would serve as a "silent supporter" of the group. On the same day, a few hours later, Constitutional Court published a judgment, in which judge Jaklič disclosed that Accetto had several times pressured other judges to decide cases in favour of the Cerar government's decisions or legislation. Several journalists and politicians, and former European Court of Human Rights judge and Constitutional Court judge Bostjan M. Zupančič, stated that Accetto should resign. Former president of the Constitutional Court Ernest Petrič commented that the court should be without a stain and that judge's lying to other judges "the worst thing possible." Constitutional Court judge Marko Šorli confirmed that judges had not known about Accetto's correspondence with Cerar and that Accetto had not informed judges about it. Former judge of the Constitutional Court Matevž Krivic said at first that the accusations were unfounded, damaging and "unacceptable", and three days later informed the public that he expects Accetto's resignation, if the allegations are proven to be true. Accetto called claims "an attack on me and my integrity" and the president of the Constitutional Court Rajko Knez called them "unsubstantiated". Vili Kovačič held asked for resignation of three judges, namely Accetto, Knez, and Špelca Mežnar.

On October 22, 2019, media reported that criminal procedure against Accetto was initiated for unfair, subverted, and skewed decisionmaking. According to the copy of the criminal charge, published first by Požareport.si, Accetto was accused of hiding the true relationship with the Cerar's political party, and deceiving the court, in order to be able to judge on a case concerning a prohibited music concert. The case was on lower levels decided by Ksenija Klampfer, then the Head of the Administrative Unit Maribor, and currently a minister belonging to the Cerar's political party, and Vesna Gjerkeš Žnidar, then a Minister of Interior belonging to the Cerar's political party. Accetto had refused to deal with the case expeditiously, and had dismissed the appeal against Klapmfer's and Gjerkeš Žnidar's decisions as unfounded, but the Administrative Court had later found that the concert was prohibited illegally.

On November 12, 2019, Vili Kovačič filed another set of criminal charges against Accetto for subverted and skewed decision making in 22 of Constitutional Court decisions involving Cerar’s party candidates or projects.

Under the constitution, the State Prosecutors’ Office is needs a Parliament’s permission to prosecute a judge and as of November 2019, it has not yet asked the National Assembly to approve the prosecution of Accetto.
