= 1996 Slovenian electoral system referendum =

A referendum on the electoral system was held in Slovenia on 8 December 1996. Voters were given three options to approve or not; a compensatory system, a two-round majority system and a proportional representation system at a national level.

Due to the low turnout of 37.9%, none of the proposals crossed the legal threshold and the results were invalidated. Later, in 1998, the results were revisited by the Constitutional Court, who found that the two round majority system had in fact been approved. However, the system ended up not being adopted after negotiations between parliamentary parties resulted in the approval of a proportional representation system with a 4% electoral threshold, which was added as an amendment to Article 80 of the Constitution, bypassing the court ruling.

== Results ==
=== Option A: Compensatory system ===
The compensatory system (mixed-member proportional representation) was proposed by the National Assembly. It would have 44 single member constituencies elected via the two-round system, complemented by a list vote using proportional representation, which would produce a more proportional seat total. Voters would cast two ballots (one for their constituency, and one for the national list).

Choice	Votes	%
For	83,864	14.38
Against	237,041	40.64
Invalid/blank votes	56,907	9.76
Total	583,297	100
Registered voters/turnout	1,537,529	37.9
Source: Nohlen & Stöver

=== Option B: Two-round majority system ===
The two-round majority system would have 88 single member constituencies. It was proposed by the Social Democratic Party of Slovenia and 43,710 voters.

Choice	Votes	%
For	259,687	44.52
Against	139,384	23.90
Invalid/blank votes	56,907	9.76
Total	583,297	100
Registered voters/turnout	1,537,529	37.9
Source: Nohlen & Stöver

=== Option C: Proportional representation system ===
Option C was proposed by 30 members of the National Assembly. It would be a system of open list proportional representation, whereby members would be elected from one nationwide constituency in proportion to their party's percentage of the vote.

Choice	Votes	%
For	152,784	26.19
Against	207,965	35.65
Invalid/blank votes	56,907	9.76
Total	583,297	100
Registered voters/turnout	1,537,529	37.9
Source: Nohlen & Stöver

=== Against all ===
A total of 32,974 people selected none of the above.
