= Rok Čeferin =

Slovene lawyer, professor and judge

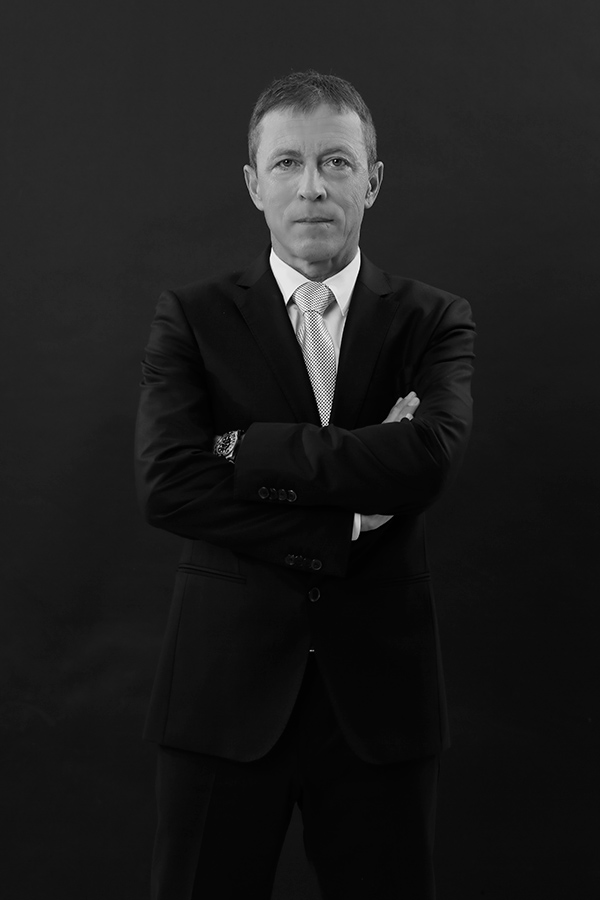

13th President of the Constitutional Court of Slovenia
- Incumbent
- Assumed office 19 December 2024
- Preceded by: Matej Accetto

12th Vice-President of the Constitutional Court of Slovenia
- In office 15 December 2021 – 15 December 2024
- Preceded by: Matej Accetto
- Succeeded by: Neža Kogovšek Šalamon

Judge of the Constitutional Court of Slovenia
- Incumbent
- Assumed office 27 September 2019
- Preceded by: Etelka Korpič-Horvat

Personal details
- Born: 5 May 1964 (age 62) Ljubljana
- Citizenship: Slovenia
- Parent: Peter Čeferin
- Education: University of Ljubljana
- Occupation: Lawyer

Rok Čeferin, * 5 May 1964, Ljubljana, is a Slovene lawyer, professor and judge of the Constitutional Court of Slovenia.

He has served as President of the Constitutional Court of Slovenia since 19 December 2024.

== Career ==
He graduated with a degree in law from the Faculty of Law at the University of Ljubljana in 1989. He earned his doctorate from the same faculty in 2012.

After graduating, he took a position at the law firm of his father, the well-known attorney Peter Čeferin, where he continued working as an attorney after passing the bar exam. Together with his father and brother, Aleksander Čeferin, they founded a law firm that is today one of the largest and most well-established in Slovenia. He practiced law until his election as a judge of the Constitutional Court.

He is an assistant professor at the Faculty of Social Sciences at the University of Ljubljana, where he lectures on media law.

On September 28, 2019, the National Assembly elected him as a judge of the Constitutional Court of Slovenia. On December 16, 2021, he was elected vice president, and on December 19, 2024, he was also elected President of this court.

== Private life ==
His brother is Aleksander Čeferin, slovene lawyer and president of UEFA.
