= Nina Betetto =

Slovene lawyer and judge

Judge of the Constitutional Court of Slovenia
- Preceded by: Špelca Mežnar

Vice-President of the Supreme Court of Slovenia
- In office 2011–2017
- President: Branko Masleša

Personal details
- Parent: Milan Betetto
- Education: University of Ljubljana
- Occupation: Lawyer

Nina Betetto is a Slovene lawyer, judge of the Constitutional Court of Slovenia and former judge and vice-president of the Supreme Court of Slovenia.

== Career ==
Betteto graduated with a degree in law from the Faculty of Law at the University of Ljubljana and in French from the Faculty of Arts at the University of Ljubljana in 1985. In 1987, she passed the bar exam. She earned her master's degree from the Faculty of Law at the University of Ljubljana in 1994.

She began her career as a judicial associate at the Higher Court in Ljubljana, and subsequently served as a judge at all levels, including as a Supreme Court judge at the Supreme Court of Slovenia from 2006 to 2025. Between 2011 and 2017, she served as the Vice President of the Supreme Court of Slovenia.

She has been a member of the Venice Commission since 2024.

In 2025, the National Assembly elected her as a judge of the Constitutional Court of Slovenia.

== Personal life ==
Betetto¨s father was Milan Betetto (1922–2007), Slovene dermatologist and professor at the Faculty of Medicine at the University of Ljubljana. He was also a professional ice hockey player.
