= Judiciary of Slovenia =

Overview of court system in Slovenia

The judiciary in Slovenia is one of the three constitutional branches of government and is independent of the other two. Judges enjoy a permanent mandate and are appointed by the National Assembly (Slovene: Državni zbor) after they have been nominated by the Judicial Council (Sodni svet), which itself is not part of the judicial branch of the government.

All lawyers practicing before the courts must have passed a special state examination after they have finished their legal studies and completed a training period at a court or a practicing advocate. Judges are usually not chosen from practicing lawyers but rather they follow a training at a court as one of the judicial officials.

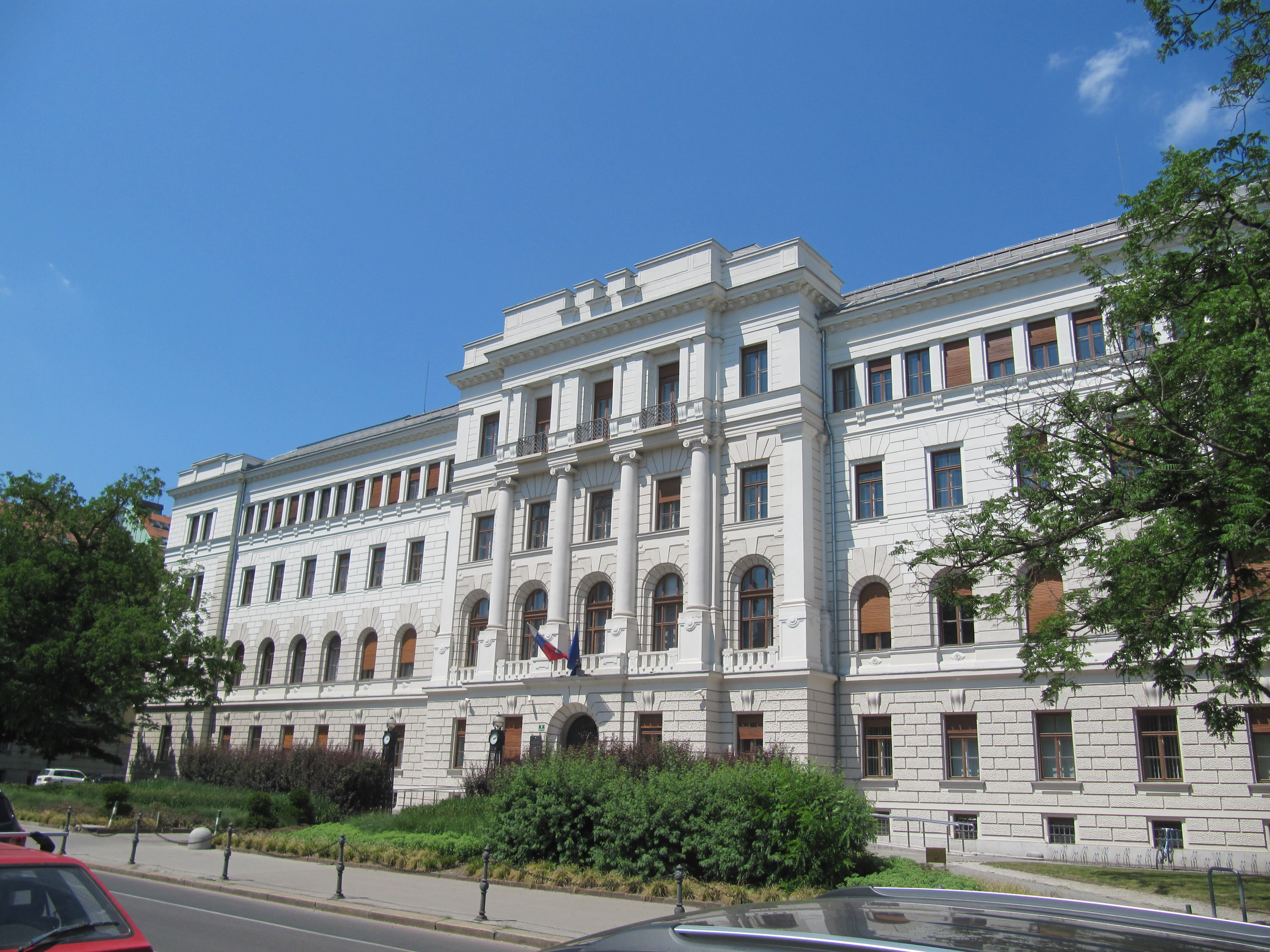
Supreme Court of Slovenia in Ljubljana

The judicial system comprises several types of courts and is hierarchically divided in three instances. On the first instance, the ordinary courts are divided into civil and criminal courts and are further divided upon the importance of cases before them into 44 Okrajna (local courts for minor offences and small civil cases) and 11 Okrožna (district courts for all other cases) courts.

There exist also specialised labour, social security and administrative courts. On the second instance, there are four appellate courts (Višja sodišča) located in Celje, Koper, Ljubljana and Maribor and a specialised appellate court for labour and social security located in Ljubljana. These courts hear appeals against first instance decisions concerning law and facts.

The highest court is the Supreme Court of the Republic of Slovenia (Vrhovno sodišče Republike Slovenije), which is responsible for the uniform jurisprudence and thus normally only hear appeals concerning the proper application of law.

The Constitutional Court of Slovenia (Ustavno sodišče Republike Slovenije)is separated from the regular judiciary system, but is nevertheless the highest court in matters of constitutionality and respect for human rights and fundamental freedoms.
