= Čeferin =

Čeferin is a surname. Notable people with the surname include:

- Aleksander Čeferin (born 1967), Slovenian lawyer and football administrator
- Darko Čeferin (born 1968), Slovenian football referee
- Peter Čeferin (born 1938), Slovenian attorney and author
