= Rajko Knez =

Slovenian jurist (born 1969)

- Born: October 30, 1969 (age 56); Slovenj Gradec

Rajko Knez (born 1969, Slovenj Gradec) is a Slovene jurist and professor currently serving on the Constitutional Court of Slovenia.

Knez was born in Slovenj Gradec, Slovenia. He graduated from the faculty of law at the University of Maribor, focusing on the field of contractual relations in private international law. He completed his Master of Science in the field of commercial law at the same faculty in 1996. Two years later, he passed the state bar exam. He received his doctorate in 2000 at the Faculty of Law, University of Maribor, under the mentorship of Dr. Miroslava Geč Korošec, after previous preparation of a doctorate in the field of environmental protection in the United States, where he also practiced law for a short time.

On 25 April 2017, Dr. Knez assumed the office of Constitutional Judge, succeeding Dr. Ernest Petrič, whose term of office expired on that day. On 19 December 2018, Dr. Knez took office as the President of the Constitutional Court of Slovenia. His term expired on 15 December 2021 with his resignation.
