= Neža Kogovšek Šalamon =

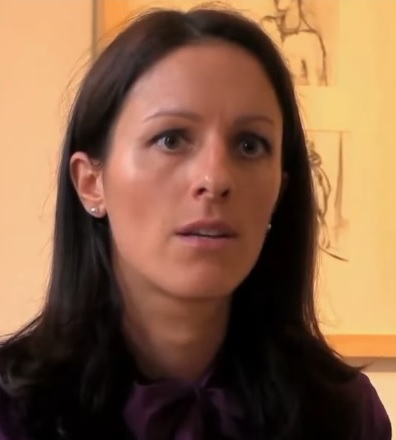

13th Vice-President of the Constitutional Court of Slovenia
- Incumbent
- Assumed office 16 December 2024
- Preceded by: Rok Čeferin

Judge of the Constitutional Court of Slovenia
- Incumbent
- Assumed office 1 January 2023
- Preceded by: Marjan Pavčnik

Personal details
- Born: 7 August 1978 (age 48) Ljubljana
- Citizenship: Slovenia
- Education: University of Ljubljana (LLB, PhD); University of Notre Dame (LLM)
- Occupation: Lawyer

Neža Kogovšek Šalamon, * 7 August 1978, is a Slovene Lawyer, professor and judge of the Constitutional Court of Slovenia.

She has served as vice-president of the Constitutional Court of Slovenia since 16 December 2024.

== Career ==
She graduated from the Faculty of Law at the University of Ljubljana in 2002 and earned her master's degree in law (LL.M.) from the University of Notre Dame in 2004. In 2006, she passed the bar exam. She earned her doctorate from the Faculty of Law at the University of Ljubljana in 2011.

From 2004 to 2018, she worked as a researcher at the private Peace Institute, serving as the institute's director for six years. From 2018 to 2022, she headed the discrimination assessment department at the Advocate of the Principle of Equality.

In 2022, the National Assembly elected her as a judge of the Constitutional Court of Slovenia, and she took office on January 1, 2023. On December 16, 2024, she was elected Vice President of this court.
