= Lovro Šturm =

Slovenian jurist and politician (1938–2021)

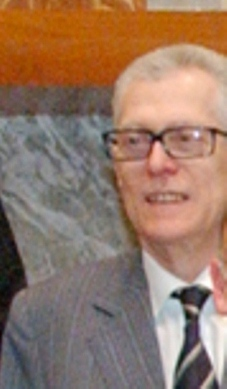
- Šturm in 2004

Minister of Justice of Slovenia
- In office 2004–2008

Minister of Education of Slovenia
- In office 2000–2000

President of the Constitutional Court of Slovenia
- In office 1997–1998

Judge of the Constitutional Court of Slovenia
- In office 1990–1998

Personal details
- Born: 19 May 1938 Ljubljana, Drava Banovina, Kingdom of Yugoslavia
- Died: 2 December 2021 (aged 83) Slovenia
- Education: University of Ljubljana
- Profession: Jurist, professor

Lovro Šturm (19 May 1938 – 2 December 2021) was a Slovenian jurist and politician. He was a law professor and served as the president and judge of the Constitutional Court of Slovenia, the Minister of Education and Minister of Justice of Slovenia.

== Biography ==
Šturm was born in Ljubljana, Slovenia (then part of the Yugoslavia). After completing grammar school in Ljubljana, he enrolled at the Faculty of Law at Ljubljana University. He completed his degree in 1961. After completing additional studies in Trieste and Strasbourg, he was awarded a diploma by the International Faculty of Comparative Law in 1963.

He headed the Public Administration Institute of the Faculty of Law in Ljubljana. Šturm was the President of the Council of the Public Administration Institute. Between 1976 and 1976, he worked as a legal advisor of the OECD, and between 1977 and 1988 at the United Nations.

He was the author of twelve books and two hundred publications and was an expert in the field of administrative–legal sciences. His work has been part of twenty-two group research projects. His scientific contributions examine the operation of administration, constitutional and judiciary protection of human rights.

During the first democratic elections in Slovenia in 1990, he was a member of the National Electoral Commission. Later that year he was elected a member of the Constitutional Court of the Republic of Slovenia, serving as its president between 1997 and 1998. In 2000, he was appointed Minister of Education in the short-lived conservative government of Andrej Bajuk. Between 2004 and 2008, he served as Minister of Justice in the center right government of Janez Janša. During this period, he initiated several reforms of the judicial system, including a simplification of the judiciary administrative procedures, a radical reduction of notary fees, and a reform aimed at shortening the legal procedures in the courts. He also formed and headed a bilateral commission for the restitution of Jewish property confiscated during the Nazi occupation of Slovenia and never returned to the owners by the Yugoslav Communist regime.

Šturm was not a member of any political party, but he was considered close to the New Slovenia party, and also ran for Parliament on the party's list in the 2000 elections. He was a member of the Slovenian liberal conservative civic platform Rally for the Republic. In November 2011, he became its president, replacing Gregor Virant who had resigned previously that year.

Šturm was a practicing Roman Catholic and a member of the Sovereign Military Order of Malta. He died in 2021.

In 1965, he authored the book/manual "How to play Go " (Slovenian: "Kako se igra Go").

== See also ==
- European Court of Human Rights

== Notes ==
Lovro Sturm – Minister of Justice (The Council Presidency/The Slovenian Government)

Political offices
Preceded by Zdenka Cerar	Minister of Justice; 2004–2008	Succeeded by Aleš Zalar
