= Ciril Ribičič =

Slovenian jurist, politician and author

Judge of the Constitutional Court of Slovenia
- In office 2000–2009

Vice-President of the Constitutional Court of Slovenia
- In office 2007–2009

President of the Constitutional Law Society of Slovenia
- Incumbent
- Assumed office 2007

Personal details
- Born: June 30, 1947 (age 79) Ljubljana, People's Republic of Slovenia, Federal People's Republic of Yugoslavia
- Parent: Mitja Ribičič (father)
- Education: University of Ljubljana
- Occupation: Jurist, politician, author

Ciril Ribičič (born 30 June 1947) is a Slovenian jurist, politician and author. From 2000 to 2009, he served as a member of the Constitutional Court of Slovenia, and was its vice-president from 2007 to 2009.

== Early life and education ==
Ciril Ribičič was born in Ljubljana, then part of the People's Republic of Slovenia in former Yugoslavia. His father was Mitja Ribičič, one of the most influential officials of the Yugoslav Secret Police in Slovenia. He studied law at the University of Ljubljana. In the late 1970s and 1980s, he published several treatises in the field of constitutional law in the condition of Yugoslav self-management socialism.

== Career ==
In the late 1980s, he emerged as one of the foremost members of the reformist leadership in the League of Communists of Slovenia, together with Milan Kučan. He rose to prominence as the chairman of the Slovene delegation at the 14th Congress of the League of Communists of Yugoslavia, held in Belgrade in January 1990. The congress ended in the dissolution of the Yugoslav Communist Party, after the Slovene delegation decided to withdraw in protest against the domination of Serbian Communists who had embraced Serbian nationalism.

In 1990, the League of Communists of Slovenia introduced democratic reforms and renamed itself to Party of Democratic Renewal (Slovene: Stranka demokratične prenove, SDP). Ribičič was elected as its first president. In April 1990, the party lost the elections to the Democratic Opposition of Slovenia, and Ribičič became one of the two main leaders of the Slovenian left wing opposition. He was re-elected to the Slovenian National Assembly in 1992, and was one of the architects of the so-called grand coalition, formed by the Liberal Democratic Party, the Slovene Christian Democrats, the Social Democratic Party of Slovenia and his own Party of Democratic Reforms. Although this coalition, led by the Liberal Democrat Janez Drnovšek, gradually disintegrated between 1994 and 1996, it prevented the political isolation of the former Communists and ensured their return to power.

In 1993, Ribičič stepped down from the leadership of the party. He withdrew completely from politics by 1996, dedicating himself to academic activity within the University of Ljubljana. In 2000, he was appointed member of the Constitutional Court of Slovenia. He is a full professor of Constitutional Law at the Ljubljana University Law School, where he has taught Constitutional Law for more than forty years and for ten years European Human Rights Law.

In 2007 he was elected president of the Constitutional Law Society of Slovenia, and published the book Evropsko pravo človekovih pravic (European Human Rights Law) and several books and articles on constitutional law, federalism, parliamentary system, electoral system and local government. After he was elected constitutional judge in 2000, he participated with papers at many international conferences and congresses.

He published the book Človekove pravice in ustavna demokracija [Human Rights and Constitutional Democracy] (Študentska založba, Ljubljana, 2010) in which he has tried to developed a doctrine of “positive activism” of the Constitutional Court, an activism which is in favour of higher standards of protection of human rights and freedoms. The translation of this book was published in Belgrade in 2012. He was awarded a Crystal Star in 2008 for promotion of European law in Slovenia. He has been leading excursions with students to the European Court of Human Rights (ECrtHR) and has organized the annual competition Rubicon on presenting judgments of the ECrtHR. In 2011 he spoke on constitutional democracy at the World Jurist Association Congress in Prague, on positive activism of constitutional court at round table of Croatian Academy of Sciences and Arts in Zagreb, on case-law of the ECtHR on Freedom of expression (TAIEX workshop), in Skopje, on case law of Slovenian Constitutional Court in Brno, and organized a round table discussion on 60-anniversary of ECHR and 20-anniversary of Slovenian Constitution in the framework of 9th European Law Conference in Kranjska Gora.

He served two terms in the Venice Commission (European Commission for Democracy through Law), from January 2012 to January 2016 and from 2016 to 2020. In early 2012, the government of the Prime Minister Janez Janša opined that he was not a member of the Commission as, according to them, his appointment in January that year had been invalid. They decided so due to the fact that the government of Prime Minister Borut Pahor named him to that position in time when two-party coalition government was reduced to the minority status after the departure of two other coalition partners. The Venice Commission then confirmed his full tenure with a consensus.
