= Tito street decision in Slovenia =

Landmark court ruling in Slovenia

The Tito Street decision refers to a landmark October 2011 Constitutional Court of Slovenia ruling U–I–109/10, in which the court found that the April 2009 naming of a street in Slovenia's capital Ljubljana after Josip Broz Tito was unconstitutional. The court unanimously ruled that "the name Tito does not only symbolise the liberation of the territory of present-day Slovenia from fascist occupation in WWII as claimed by the other party in the case, but also grave violations of human rights and basic freedoms, especially in the decade following WWII." This was the first time that a highest national court legally evaluated the symbolism of Josip Broz Tito's name.

== Background ==
In April 2009 Ljubljana city council decided that a newly built street in Ljubljana was to be named "Tito Street" (Slovene: Titova cesta) after the former SFR Yugoslavia leader Josip Broz Tito. The proposal was put forward by Ljubljana mayor Zoran Janković and city councillor Peter Božič. The naming was highly controversial and received extensive public attention. Opponents of the naming collected numerous signatures against naming the street after Tito. They also tried to prevent it by local referendum, but Ljubljana authorities successfully prevented the local referendum. A group of citizens, some of them former victims and political prisoners of the communist regime, filed an application with the Constitutional Court of Slovenia, asking it to find the naming of the street unconstitutional.

== The ruling ==
The case is U-I-109/10 and the decision was issued on 3 October 2011. According to the court, adoption of independence documents means not only an interruption of links between the Republic of Slovenia and the Socialist Federal Republic of Yugoslavia, but also a break with Yugoslavia's basic concept of the constitutional system of values. Unlike the former Yugoslavia, the Republic of Slovenia is based on the rule of law and the constitutional system is based on respect for human rights and fundamental freedoms. Human dignity is at the heart of the constitutional order of the Republic of Slovenia. The court stressed that the name Tito symbolizes the postwar communist regime, marked by extensive and serious violations of human rights and fundamental freedoms, particularly in the decade immediately after the Second World War. In Slovenia, where the development of democracy and free society based on respect for human dignity, broke ties with the previous regime, the glorification of the authoritarian Communist regime with naming a street after the leader of this regime is unconstitutional. Naming a street after Josip Broz Tito in Ljubljana was not maintained over from the previous regime, in which case it would be only a part of history today. The challenged local ordinance was adopted in 2009, eighteen years after Slovenia's independence and the establishment of constitutional order based on constitutional values, which are contrary to the values of the regime before independence. Such new namings have no place in current time, because they are contrary to the principle of respect for human dignity which has its basis in the Article One of the Constitution and falls into the very core of the constitutional system of the Republic of Slovenia.

== Concurring opinions ==
The decision was unanimous with several concurring opinions. Judges Korpic-Horvat and Klampfer wrote in their concurring opinion that the reasoning of the majority decision was unbalanced in excessively criticizing Tito and the Communism. Judge Sovdat stressed that under the decision only new namings of streets after Communist symbols were unconstitutional. Names of those streets that had existed since before the independence were constitutional, just like Napoleon statue in Ljubljana was constitutional. Judge Jadek-Pensa in its concurring opinion stressed that naming a street did not have only informative meaning. Naming a street after someone shows that the government honors this person. Judges Zobec and Mozetic in their concurring opinion argued that every person should have standing before the court in cases like this one. Concurring opinions of Judges Petrič and Sovdat, on the contrary, argued that not all of the applicants in this case had standing.

== Case citation ==
Decision U-I-109/10 (Tito Street decision) of the Constitutional Court of Slovenia, issued on 3 October 2011

== Aftermath ==
In a separate case, in May 2021 the Constitutional Court of Slovenia annulled the renaming of Tito's street to the Slovenian Independence Street in the municipality Radenci for procedural reasons. The municipality renamed the street without enabling residents to initiate a local referendum about the street's name. The municipality renamed the street once again, and it did so again without allowing a referendum. In September 2021, the Constitutional Court temporarily halted the renaming until it would finally rule whether procedural rules had been followed. Judge Jaklič wrote a critical dissenting opinion.
