= Antonio Mario La Pergola =

Italian academic (1931–2007)

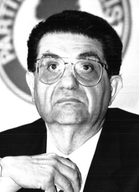

President of the Constitutional Court
- In office 24 June 1986 – 14 June 1987
- Preceded by: Livio Paladin
- Succeeded by: Francesco Saja

Minister for Community Policies
- In office 28 July 1987 – 22 July 1989
- Prime Minister: Giovanni Goria; Ciriaco De Mita
- Preceded by: Luigi Granelli
- Succeeded by: Pier Luigi Romita

Member of the European Parliament
- In office 1 July 1989 – 1 July 1994
- Constituency: Italian Islands

Personal details
- Born: 13 November 1931 Bronte, Italy
- Died: 19 July 2007 (aged 75) Rome, Italy
- Party: Italian Socialist Party
- Profession: Politician, Jurist

Antonio Mario La Pergola (13 November 1931 – 19 July 2007) was an Italian jurist, Advocate General and later Judge for the European Court of Justice, as well as President of the Venice Commission of the Council of Europe.

== Biography ==
=== University career ===
La Pergola always used his legal expertise, and the experience he has acquired in various public service posts, in the cause of European integration. He wrote extensively on issues in this field, and was professor of constitutional and public law at Padua University, and subsequently at the University of Bologna and Rome ("La Sapienza"). He was also visiting professor at foreign Universities, [including University College (Dublin), Johns Hopkins, University of Texas (Austin), University of California (Los Angeles), Harvard University (Boston), Externado de Colombia (Bogotà)], had honorary degrees conferred on him (Universidad Complutense and Universidad Carlos Tercero in Madrid, Lisbon and Bucharest), was made honorary professor (Johns Hopkins, Salamanca, Externado de Colombia, Universidad Nacional Autónoma de Mexico, the Universidad Nacional de La Plata and the Universidad del Litoral de Belgrano in Argentina), and received other forms of international recognition (International Rome-Brasília prize) for his contribution in respect of, among other things, the legal problems of supra-national integration.

=== Institutional offices ===
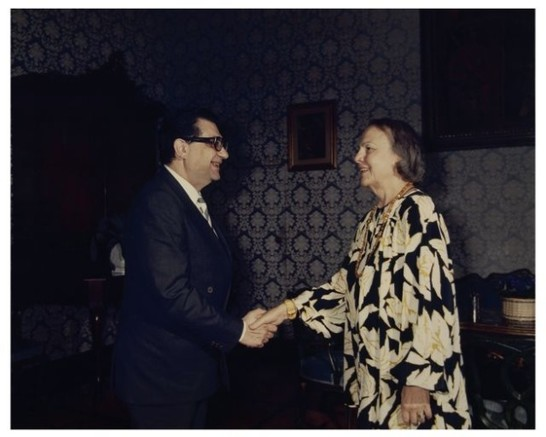
Antonio La Pergola with President of the Italian Chamber of Deputies, Nilde Iotti, 1986

La Pergola was director of the Institute of regional studies at the National Research Centre; member of the Supreme Council of the Judiciary (1976-1978); a judge at the Constitutional Court, acting as rapporteur for significant judgments in the field of relations between Community law and domestic law (1978-1986), then President of that Court (1986-1987); Minister for coordinating Community policies (1987-1989), and sponsor of the law on fulfilment of the obligations resulting from Italy’s membership of the European Communities (1986-1989); Member of the European Parliament and Chairman of the Committees on scientific research and culture (1989-1994). As Advocate-General and judge of the Court of Justice of the European Communities (1994-2006), he has been able to deal with a very broad range of issues concerning compliance with and interpretation of the Treaties establishing the Communities and the Union, and the relevant secondary legislation.

In the Council of Europe and other international fora, he was a member of a number of expert bodies looking into studying legal matters (Badinter Commission for the establishment of the Court of Arbitration and Conciliation; the Kissinger and Carrington Commission of constitutional mediators dealing with the end of apartheid in South Africa; the Committee of Wise Persons on the restructuring of the Council of Europe).

From 1990 he chaired the Council of Europe Commission on Democracy through Law, known as the Venice Commission, which has assisted all countries in central and eastern Europe on their path to democratic transition and today comprises all European states and many non-European states.

La Pergola was president of the Italian Istituto Poligrafico e Zecca dello Stato.

== See also ==
- List of members of the European Court of Justice
