= Accettola =

Accettola is a surname of Italian origin. Notable people with the surname include:

- Luca Accettola (born 2004), Canadian soccer player
- Vincent Accettola (born 1994), American producer and arts administrator

== See also ==
- Accetto, surname
