= Miroslava Geč Korošec =

Slovenian lawyer and judge

Miroslava Geč Korošec (28 February 1939, Maribor - July 19, 2002, Piran) was a Slovenian lawyer and judge. Between 1968 and 1971, she held the position of a judge at the Municipal Court in Ptuj, later at the Municipal Court in Maribor. In 1998, she became the first judge of the Constitutional Court of Slovenia, where she worked until retirement in 2000.
