= Tadej Golob =

Slovene mountaineer and writer (born 1967)

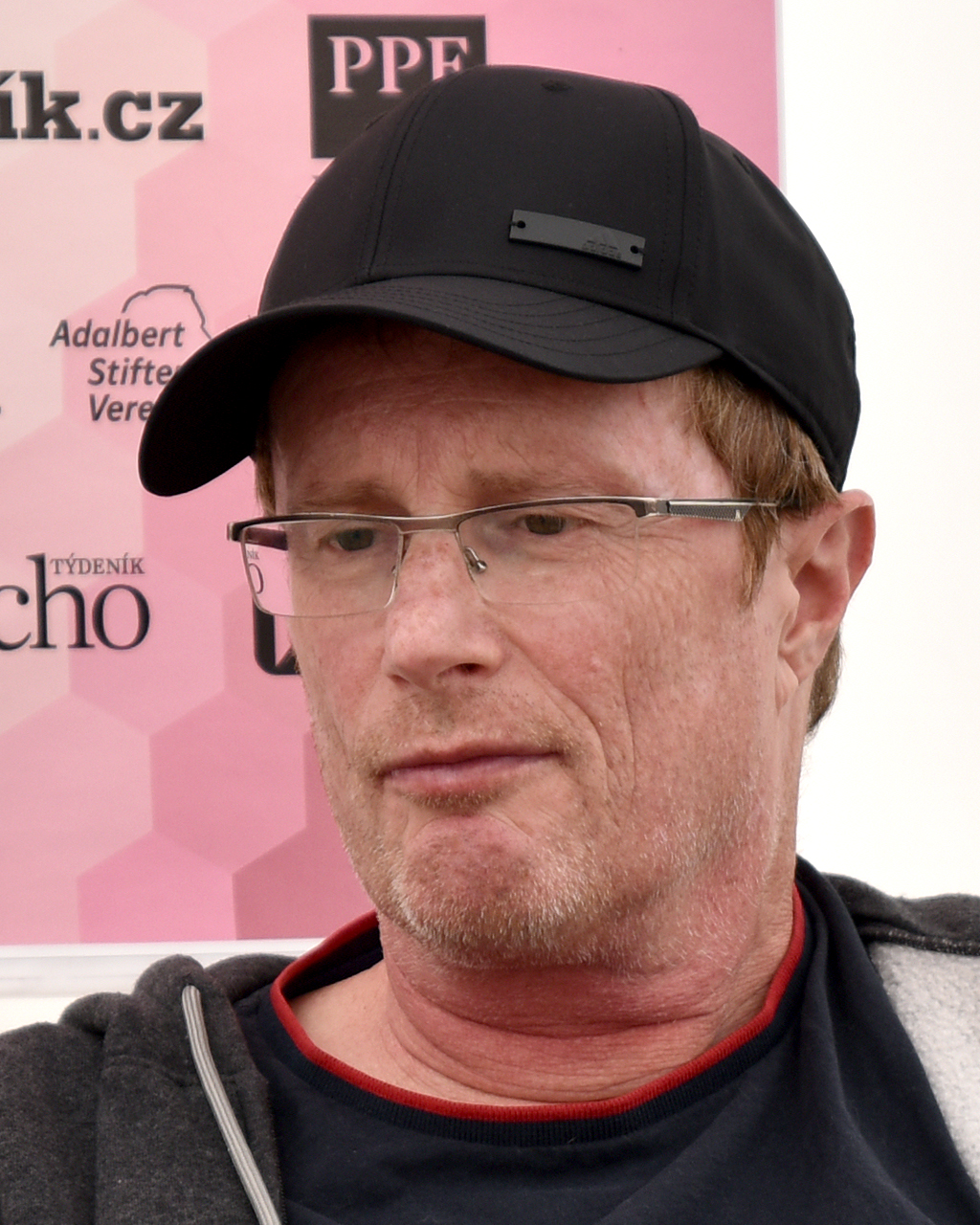
- Tadej Golob (2024)
- Born: 1967 (age 58–59); Maribor, Slovenia, Yugoslavia
- Occupations: Writer, mountaineer
- Writing career
- Notable works: Zlati Zob, Jezero
- Notable awards: Kresnik Award; 2010 Svinjske nogice

Tadej Golob (born 1967) is a Slovene mountaineer and writer.

Golob was born in Maribor in 1967 and grew up in the small town of Lenart v Slovenskih goricah in northeastern Slovenia. He moved to Ljubljana to study journalism but never completed his studies. He worked as a contributor to various magazines, but is known in Slovenia chiefly as an alpine climber.

In 2010 Golob won the Kresnik Award for best novel with his debut novel Svinjske nogice (Pigs' Legs). It is a witty story of an aspiring comics artist looking for inspiration, trying to make ends meet and coping on the margin with a non-existent career, his family and society. The title refers to the lead character's attempt to master the art of tattooing by practicing on pigs' legs.

== Published works ==
- Z Everesta, travelogue about skiing down Mount Everest (2000) co-written with Davo Karničar and Urban Golob
- Moške svinje, a selection of his contributions from Slovene edition of Playboy magazine, (2005)
- Zgodba iz prve roke, biography of Zoran Predin, (2008)
- Svinjske nogice, novel, (2009)
- Peter Vilfan, biography of Peter Vilfan, (2010)
- Zlati zob, youth novel, (2011)
- Ali boma ye!, novel, (2013)
- Kam je izginila Brina, youth novel, (2013)
- Jezero, crime novel, (2016)
- Leninov park, crime novel, (2018)
- Nespodobni odvetnik (Eng. Indecent lawyer), biography of Peter Čeferin, (2018)
- Dolina rož, crime novel, (2019)
- Virus, crime novel, (2020)
- Koma, crime novel, (2022)
- Oj, Triglav, moj dom, crime novel, (2023)
- Brezno, crime novel, (2025)
