= Venice Commission =

Advisory body of the Council of Europe

European Commission for Democracy through Law
- Commissione europea per la Democrazia attraverso il Diritto (Italian)
- Formation: May 10, 1990; 36 years ago (statute)
- Founded at: Venice, Italy
- Headquarters: Strasbourg, France (Secretariat); Scuola Grande di San Giovanni Evangelista, Venice, Italy (Plenary)
- Location: Europe
- Region served: Europe
- President: Marta Cartabia
- Parent organization: Council of Europe
- Website: www.venice.coe.int

The Venice Commission (French: Commission de Venise, officially titled European Commission for Democracy through Law) is an advisory body of the Council of Europe, composed of independent experts in the field of constitutional law. It was created in 1990 after the fall of the Berlin Wall, at a time of urgent need for constitutional assistance in Central and Eastern Europe.

== Creation ==
The idea to create a Commission for Democracy through Law as a group of experts in constitutional law was conceived by the then Minister for Community Policies of Italy, Antonio Mario La Pergola. The election of the name was based on La Pergola's conviction that sustainable democracies could only be built in a constitutional framework based on the rule of law.

The formal proposal for the creation of the commission was made by the Italian Minister of Foreign Affairs, Gianni De Michelis, who invited the other Foreign Affairs ministers of the Council of Europe to the Conference for the Creation of the European Commission for Democracy through Law that was held at the Giorgio Cini Foundation in San Giorgio Maggiore, Venice from 31 March to 1 April 1989. At this meeting, Foreign Affairs and Justice ministers reunited with representatives of the Constitutional Courts of the 21 countries of the Council of Europe.

The committee of ministers, seeking to assist the countries of Central and Eastern Europe, approved the creation of the Commission as a partial agreement at the session in Venice from 19 to 20 January 1990. The Foreign Affairs and Justice Ministers of Bulgaria, Czechoslovakia, Hungary, Poland, the German Democratic Republic, Romania, the Soviet Union and SFR Yugoslavia also participated as observers in this meeting.

On 10 May 1990 ministers from 18 countries (Austria, Belgium, Cyprus, Denmark, Finland, France, Greece, Ireland, Italy, Luxembourg, Malta, Norway, Portugal, San Marino, Spain, Sweden, Switzerland and Turkey) of the Council of Europe adopted the statute of the Commission.

== Member states ==
Member Associate member Observer Special status or cooperation

Starting with 18 member states, soon all member states of the Council of Europe joined the Venice Commission and since 2002 non-European states can also become full members. As of 2026, the Commission counts 61 member states – the 46 member states of the Council of Europe and 15 other countries. There are four observers. The Palestinian National Authority and South Africa have a special co-operation status. The EU, OSCE/ODIHR, and OAS (Organization of American States) participate in the plenary sessions of the Commission.

=== Former member states ===
Russia was a member state of the Venice Commission from 1996 until 2022, when it got expelled from both the Council of Europe and the Venice Commission following its 2022 invasion of Ukraine. In January 2026, United States President Donald Trump announced that the United States would withdraw from the organization. The United States will formally withdraw from the organization on 31 December 2026.

== Members ==
The members are "senior academics, particularly in the fields of constitutional or international law, supreme or constitutional court judges or members of national parliaments". Acting on the Commission in their individual capacity, the members are appointed for four years by the participating countries. The current and former members include, amongst other notable academics and judges:

- Nina Betetto (former vice-president of the Supreme Court of Slovenia)
- Ugo Mifsud Bonnici (Professor of Law and former President of Malta),
- Talija Chabrieva, Russian jurist, author of the 2020 amendments to the Constitution of Russia
- Jean-Claude Colliard (Chancellor of University Paris 1 - Panthéon-Sorbonne, former member of the Constitutional Council),
- Christoph Grabenwarter (Judge at the Constitutional Court of Austria),
- Wolfgang Hoffmann-Riem (Former Judge, Federal Constitutional Court of Germany),
- Jan Erik Helgesen (Professor at University of Oslo),
- Hanna Suchocka (Former Prime Minister of Poland, Professor at Adam Mickiewicz University in Poznań and Chair of the Constitutional Law Department)
- Gret Haller (Senior Lecturer at Johann Wolfgang Goethe University, Germany, former President of the Swiss Parliament),
- Klemen Jaklič (Lecturer on Law at Harvard Law School, Harvard University),
- Cármen Lúcia Antunes Rocha (Professor at Pontifical Catholic University of Minas Gerais, Judge of Supreme Federal Court of Brazil),
- Jeffrey Jowell (Professor of Law and former Dean of University College London),
- Philip Dimitrov (Former Prime Minister of Bulgaria, Member of the Constitutional Court of Bulgaria),
- Kaarlo Tuori (Professor of Jurisprudence at the University of Helsinki),
- Pieter van Dijk (State Councillor, Chair of the Constitutional Law Committee, and former Judge of the European Court of Human Rights),
- Jan Velaers (Professor at University of Antwerp)
- Juan José Romero Guzmán (Former President, Constitutional Court of Chile, Professor at Pontificia Universidad Católica de Chile)

== Leadership ==
Antonio Mario La Pergola was the first President of the Venice Commission. Jan Erik Helgesen, a professor at the University of Oslo, was president of the Commission for several years, through to 2009, later becoming 1st Vice-President. From December 2009 to December 2021, Gianni Buquicchio held the presidency. Claire Bazy-Malaurie has been president since December 2021.

Simona Granata-Menghini is the current Director, Secretary of the Commission. The Secretary heads the Commission's secretariat at the Council of Europe's headquarters in Strasbourg.

The Commission’s prime function is to provide constitutional assistance to member states. This assistance mainly comes in the form of Opinions. These Opinions relate to draft constitutions or constitutional amendments, or to other draft or legislation in force. The Venice Commission Opinions on specific countries cover a wide range of topics: the system of checks and balances, and the relations amongst different branches of power, the territorial organisation of the States, principles of the rule of law, fundamental rights and freedoms, organisation of the bodies of the constitutional justice, the governance of the judiciary and of the prosecution service, status and powers of ombudspersons, reforms of the electoral system, regulations on the political parties and referendums, etc. At the request of a constitutional court or the European Court of Human Rights, the Commission may also provide amicus curiae briefs on comparative constitutional and international law issues related to a case under consideration.

Requests for opinions come from the participating states and the statutory organs of the Council of Europe or international organisations or bodies participating in the Venice Commission's work. The opinions adopted by the Commission are not binding but are mostly followed by member states.

The areas of the Commission's activities are as follows:

== Democratic institutions and fundamental rights ==
The aim of the assistance given by the Venice Commission is to provide a complete, precise, and objective analysis of the compatibility of laws and constitutional provisions with European and international standards, but also of the practicality and viability of the solutions envisaged by the states concerned.

=== Working method ===
The working method adopted by the Commission when providing opinions is to appoint a working group of rapporteurs (primarily from amongst its members) which advises national authorities in the preparation of the relevant law. After discussions with the national authorities and stakeholders in the country, the working group prepares a draft opinion on whether the legislative text meets the democratic standards in its field and on how to improve it on the basis of common experience. The draft opinion is discussed and adopted by the Venice Commission during a plenary session, usually in the presence of representatives from that country. After adoption, the opinion becomes public and is forwarded to the requesting body.

=== Non-directive approach ===
Although its opinions are generally reflected in the adopted legislation, the Venice Commission does not impose its solutions, but adopts a non-directive approach based on dialogue. For this reason the working group, as a rule, visits the country concerned and meets with the different political actors involved in the issue in order to ensure the most objective view of the situation.

=== Conflict resolution by providing legal advice ===
A political agreement settling a conflict should be supported by a viable legal text. It may also be possible for an agreement on a legal text to foster a political solution. For this reason the Venice Commission pays particular attention to countries which are going through or have gone through ethno-political conflicts. In this context, at the European Union's request, the Venice Commission has played an important role in developing and interpreting the constitutional law of Bosnia and Herzegovina, North Macedonia, Serbia and Montenegro as well as that of Kosovo. It has also been involved in efforts to settle the conflicts on the status of Abkhazia and South Ossetia in Georgia and Transnistria in Moldova.

The Commission drafts opinions, initiates studies and organises conferences inter alia on:

- Constitutional reform
- Emergency powers
- Federalism and regionalism
- International law issues
- Internal security services and armed forces
- Protection of fundamental rights including the freedom of religion, the freedom of assembly and association
- Protection of minorities and prohibition of discrimination
- Functioning of parliaments and judiciary

== Elections, referendums and political parties ==
The work of the Commission in the field of elections, referendums and political parties is steered by the Council for Democratic Elections (CDE). The CDE is a unique tripartite body made up of representatives of the Venice Commission, the Parliamentary Assembly of the Council of Europe (PACE) and the Congress of Local and Regional Authorities of the Council of Europe. The aim of the Council for Democratic Elections is to ensure co-operation in the electoral field between the Venice Commission as a legal body and the Parliamentary Assembly and the Congress of the Council of Europe as political bodies, in order to promote the European common values in the field of elections – the principles of the European electoral heritage.

The Commission identifies and develops standards in the area of elections through:

- Codes of good practice on elections, on referendums and on political parties
- Opinions - mostly joint ones with OSCE/ODIHR - on electoral legislation
- Legal advice to the PACE election observation missions
- "Vota" database of electoral legislation

== Constitutional and ordinary justice ==
Another branch of the Commission's activities includes co-operation with the constitutional courts and equivalent bodies. Since its creation, the Venice Commission has been aware that it is not sufficient to assist the states in the adoption of democratic constitutions but that these texts have to be implemented in reality. Key players in this field are constitutional courts and equivalent bodies exercising constitutional jurisdiction.

Cooperation with Constitutional Courts, ordinary courts and ombudspersons is done by means of:

- Opinions on and for Constitutional Courts, ordinary courts and for Ombudspersons (including amicus curiae briefs)
- Key constitutional case-law – E-bulletin and CODICES database
- Regional co-operation with courts' associations
- World Conference on Constitutional Justice
- Seminars and conferences with Constitutional Courts
- Venice Forum – advice and exchange between Constitutional courts
- Joint Council on Constitutional Justice (representatives of Courts and members of the Commission)

== Transnational studies, reports and seminars ==
While most of the work of the Commission is country specific, the Commission also prepares, through its own initiative and at request of statutory bodies such as the Parliamentary Assembly of the Council of Europe, studies and reports addressing topics of general interest in the member and observer states. Transnational topics are also covered in the Unidem seminars (University for Democracy) and published in the Science and Technique of Democracy collection.

=== Urgent Report on Cancellation of Election Results by Constitutional Courts ===
In its 2025 urgent report, the Venice Commission examined the conditions under which a constitutional court may invalidate election results, using Romania’s annulled 2024 presidential first round as the immediate context. The Commission did not assess the merits of the Romanian case itself, but instead outlined general European and international legal standards governing election annulments. It stressed that cancelling an election is an exceptional measure because it overrides the expressed will of voters and therefore must be based on clear legal rules, strong procedural safeguards, and compelling evidence that serious irregularities could have affected the outcome. The report emphasized that courts should not enjoy overly broad discretion, and that annulment should be used only as a last resort (ultima ratio), not for minor violations that do not alter results. At the same time, it affirmed that democratic systems must provide effective remedies when fraud, manipulation, or unlawful interference occurs. The Commission also highlighted new challenges raised by digital technologies, artificial intelligence, opaque campaign financing, and possible foreign influence, noting that modern electoral integrity requires legal frameworks capable of addressing non-transparent online manipulation while preserving public confidence in free and fair elections.

=== Report on Impact of the Pre-Trial Detention of Mayors on the Exercise of Local Democratic Governance ===
In its 2025 Report on the impact of the pre-trial detention of mayors on the exercise of local democratic governance, the Venice Commission examined the impact of prolonged pre-trial detention of opposition mayors on local democratic governance, prompted by concerns over the arrests, suspensions, and replacement of elected mayors in Türkiye. Rather than issuing a country-specific opinion, the Commission produced a broader report assessing how such detentions affect democracy, the rule of law, and electoral representation. It noted that the removal of mayors and appointment of government trustees had left millions of citizens governed by unelected administrators, raising concerns about the will of voters being overridden. Drawing on European and international legal standards, the report emphasized that pre-trial detention must remain exceptional, based on reasonable suspicion, proportionate, and subject to regular judicial review. It further stressed that because elected officials play a central role in political debate and representation, restrictions on their liberty can also infringe freedoms of expression and assembly. Citing European Court of Human Rights jurisprudence, the Commission warned that detention measures lacking sufficient legal grounds may serve an ulterior political purpose, such as suppressing pluralism and limiting opposition activity.

The EU and media outlets have cited to the report to criticize the pre-trial detention of mayors, such as Istanbul Mayor Ekrem İmamoğlu, and Tirana Mayor, Erion Veliaj.

=== Comparative studies and reports ===
Comparative studies on topics to do with the functioning of democracy offer initial overviews of the law in various countries. Such a comparative approach then makes it possible to identify constitutional values that are shared throughout Europe and, where relevant, any areas of weakness. The third stage is that of harmonisation, in which, on the basis of Commission recommendations, the principles concerned are incorporated into the law of those countries where they have not yet been established.

== EU integration ==
In June 2022, the European Union asked the candidate countries of Ukraine and Moldova, and the applicant country of Georgia to implement various reforms suggested by the Venice Commission in order to proceed with EU integration.

== Positions taken ==
=== Blasphemy ===
In 2009, the Venice Commission attracted rare news coverage for its opinion that "blasphemy should not be illegal".

=== Elections: boundary delimitation ===
As part of its report, European Commission for Democracy Through Law: Code of Good Practice in Electoral Matters, Guidelines and Explanatory Reports adopted October 2002, the Venice Commission recommended a number of considerations, also when dealing with issues of boundary delimitation.

=== Poland ===
==== Background and the roots of democratic backsliding ====
The 2015 Polish parliamentary elections saw the victory of the Law and Justice Party (PiS) with an outright majority against the incumbent Civic Platform party. Before the elections were held, the ruling Civic Platform party changed the Act on the Constitutional Tribunal that prevented judges from being elected before their term was over. The Civic Platform party before could only appoint three constitutional judges, as there were vacancies at the time, however, under the new rule, the governing party appointed five judges to the Polish Constitutional Tribunal as there were two vacancies that were to open right after the parliamentary elections. As a result, these are the origins of the Polish Constitutional Tribunal crisis that started in 2015.

The new Polish President, Andrzej Duda, refused for the judges to be sworn in and at the same time, the Polish Constitutional Tribunal, decided that three of the five judges were properly elected and should be sworn in out of the five appointed judges. Nonetheless, none of the judges were sworn in by the President and the governing PiS appointed five judges, passing a series of legislation related to the Tribunal that was characterized by the European Union in its first Rule of Law Recommendation as posing a serious threat to the rule of law in Poland. This legislation included around 6 specific laws, ranging from a chronology requirement, where the Tribunal had to decide cases in order that they came in which effectively allowed the newer government greater leverage with the most recent laws it has passed, to a 6-month requirement for the Court to review laws.

==== Venice Commission's First Opinion ====
On 23 December 2015, the Polish Minister for Foreign Affairs, Witold Waszczykowski, requested an opinion from the Venice Commission on the proposed changes to the Polish Constitutional Tribunal. However, in absence of vacatio legis, the legislation entered into force which: a) prevented the Commission's recommendations to be incorporated and improve the law before it had legal effect, and b) imposed a special mechanism of control on the Constitutional Tribunal which was effectively disabled from exercising its powers because the legislation changes had already been implemented. To illustrate the latter point, since the Court had at the time only 12 sitting judges, it could not review the constitutionality of current laws, as the new legislation required quorum of 13 judges. Before examining further the principles of the new Polish legislation, and in line with the aforementioned mechanism that effectively suspends the efficiency of the Tribunal, the Commission stated its 2006 Opinion related to the Romanian Constitutional Court and upheld that "it must be ensured that the Constitutional Court as the guarantor of the Constitution remains functioning as a democratic institution". Additionally, in an opinion related to the Constitutional Court of Albania that posed the question of whether the judges sitting at the Court could be involved in assessing the constitutionality of laws that affected them, the Commission again upheld that "the authorization of the Court derives from the necessity to make sure that no law is exempt from constitutional review, including laws that relate to the position of judges...".

The Commission commented specifically on the quorum through a comparative lens. It mentioned that in other European Countries, such as Albania, Austria, Azerbaijan, Belarus, Bulgaria, the Czech Republic, Georgia, Hungary, Lithuania, the Republic of Moldova, Romania and the Russian Federation, there seems to be a consensus about having two-thirds as the quorum that would allow the Constitutional Court to decide; the German Federal Constitutional Court, on the other hand, has a three-fourths requirement in both of its eight-member chambers. However, the new requirement introduced by the Polish legislator with 13 judges out of 15 judges to have quorum goes beyond the established standards according to the Commission. While European legislators agree for the need of quorum that goes above an absolute majority, the Commission warns that the proposed changes could lead to inefficiency and make the Tribunal "dysfunctional". In addition, the Commission reviews the "sequence rule", the majority for adopting decisions (2/3), and the delay on hearings, as procedural aspects, along with the disciplinary proceedings and the Tribunal's composition—all parts of the new legislation. The Opinion 833/2015 concludes by highlighting that for the achievement of checks and balances in a constitutional democracy, an independent Constitutional Court is needed, and so long there is a lack thereof, "not only is rule of law in danger, but so is democracy and human rights".

==== The National Council of the Judiciary (NCJ) reforms ====
According to Article 186 from the Polish Constitution, the National Council of the Judiciary (NCJ) is a constitutional organ that "shall safeguard the independence of courts and judges". Its main responsibilities lie in appointing judges, reviewing the professional ethic standards regarding the judiciary, a general overview of any judiciary matters and overall—the protection of the Polish judiciary's independence, thus ensuring that rule of law is upheld within this branch of government.

On 20 January 2017, the Polish government announced a comprehensive reform of the judiciary in Poland, which included the NCJ. This process of legislative changes was aided by the actions of the new composition of the Polish Constitutional Tribunal, which in its decision K5/17 declared the NCJ's Statute "unconstitutional", which paved the way for the new legislation. Among the most controversial changes were the rules on the composition of this body, whereby the adoption of this legislation forced the premature ending of the term of the contemporary members and further politicized the process of the election of the new ones. To summarize, in a period of only two years after PiS election there have been 13 laws that transformed the judiciary branch and the structure of Polish justice system, from the Constitutional Tribunal, the NCJ, to the lower courts across the country. As a result, the European Commission has established that the constitutionality of national legislation "can no longer be guaranteed" and the independence of the judicial branch has been undermined.

==== Venice Commission's Opinion on NCJ reforms ====
The President of the Parliamentary Assembly of the Council of Europe (PACE) has requested the Venice Commission to issue an opinion on the compatibility of the NCJ reforms in line with Council of Europe's rule of law standards. By looking at the new method of election of NCJ members, the early termination of the mandate of the current members, the creation of new chambers, early retirement of senior judges, and extraordinary review of final judgments, among others, the Commission has issued the Opinion 904/2017, where it clearly underlines that "the judiciary should be insulated from quickly changing political winds". In addition, towards the end the Commission focuses on the legal Polish puzzle as a whole and concludes that "each of them [the new laws]... [put] at serious risks the independence of all parts of the judiciary in Poland".

=== Legislation on religious freedoms in Montenegro ===
Since 2015, the Venice Commission was included in process of legislative reform and regulation of various legal issues related to religious freedoms and rights of religious communities in Montenegro. First opinion of the VC on the initial draft law on freedom of religion in Montenegro, was issued in November 2015. It was followed by a prolonged period of internal consultations and additional deliberations in Montenegro, resulting in the creation of a new draft law, that was followed by another opinion of the VC, issued in June 2019, recommending various improvements and clarifications.

=== Pre-trial Detention and Local Governance ===
In its 2025 report Report on the Impact of the Pre-Trial Detention of Mayors on the Exercise of Local Democratic Governance, the Venice Commission examined the implications of detaining elected local officials prior to trial. It emphasized that pre-trial detention should remain an exceptional measure, justified by case-specific reasons and subject to effective judicial oversight. The Commission highlighted that such detention may affect not only the individual rights of elected officials, but also the rights of voters and the functioning of local democracy, particularly where it risks undermining political pluralism or the effective exercise of elected mandates.

== See also ==
- Constitutionalism
- Rule according to higher law
