= Boštjan Zupančič =

Slovenian judge (born 1947)

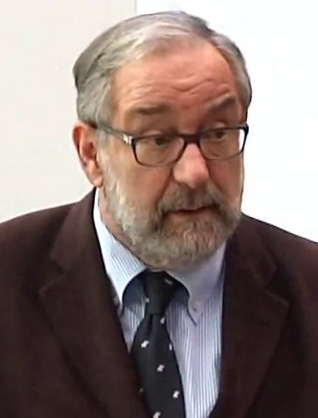
Boštjan M. Zupančič

Boštjan M. Zupančič (born 13 May 1947, in Ljubljana, Slovenia) is a former Judge at the European Court of Human Rights in Strasbourg, France (1998–2016) and also the President of the Third Chamber at this Court from November 2004 to January 2008.

== Career ==
Judge Zupančič obtained his Scientiae Juris Doctor (S.J.D.) from Harvard Law School in 1981. Earlier, he obtained his L.L.M (Master in Law) degree from Harvard Law School in 1973.

Before being appointed a judge at the European Court of Human Rights, Judge Zupančič served as a judge at the Constitutional Court of Slovenia and was the president of its Criminal Law Chamber from 1993 to 1998.

Moreover, he served on the United Nations Committee Against Torture in Geneva from 1995 to 1998 and was also the vice-chairman of the committee.

He was a visiting professor at the China University of Law and Public Policy in 1993. He taught as a full professor of law at the University of Ljubljana in 1986 and was elected the first vice-president of academic affairs of the university in 1989 and served in this capacity until 1992. He has also taught in a range of capacities at various American law schools such as Fordham University, Iowa University, etc.

Zupančič has delivered lectures extensively at various universities, including Harvard Law School, where he spoke on 'The Universality of Autonomous Legal Reasoning: Revolutionary Developments in the European Court of Human Rights in Strasbourg'; University of Sienna on 'Sovereignty in the Context of Human Rights'; University of Cardiff in UK; University of Washington, Seattle; University of British Columbia; Chong Qing University of Law and Public Policy, China; China University of Law and Public Policy, Beijing; Central European University, Budapest; University of Zagreb; Law Faculty of Galatasaray University, Istanbul amongst many others.

He has also delivered talks at various institutions such as International Association for the Protection of Human Rights, Cyprus, on 'Fair Trial in the Times of Terrorism'; the Izmir Bar Association in Turkey on 'The Jurisprudence of the European Court of Human Rights'; Association of Lawyers in Coimbra, Portugal, on 'Special Investigative Means and Human Rights in the Jurisprudence of the European Court of Human Rights'; the Human Rights Research and Practice Centre of the Union of Turkish Bar Associations in Ankara, Turkey, the Constitutional Court of Azerbaijan and the Constitutional Court of Georgia, where he spoke on 'The Interpretation of Legal Precedents and of the Judgments of the European Court of Human Rights'; Ministry of Foreign Affairs in Berlin on 'Procedural Guarantees in Criminal Proceedings: common standards in the European Union'; Amnesty International, Ljubljana; International Association of Constitutional Law, French Senate, Paris amongst many others.

He was a key speaker at the Organisation for Security and Cooperation in Europe (OSCE) in Warsaw in spring 2002. He has also presented at the Round-Table on the future of the European Court of Human Rights at the Université Robert Schuman, Strasbourg and given a series of lectures on the court to the Slovene Bar Association in Ljubljana. Furthermore, he has been invited to give lectures on the ECHR at the Institut des Sciences Politiques in Paris, every year since 2008.

In 2014, he acquired French citizenship and in January 2019 joined the far-right Eurosceptic French party, the Republican People's Union. The following month he announced his candidacy for the European Parliament on the party's list.

== Education ==
Judge Zupančič obtained his Scientiae Juris Doctor (S.J.D.) from Harvard Law School in 1981. Earlier, he obtained his L.L.M (Master in Law) degree from Harvard Law School in 1973. He was a research scholar at the École de Criminologie at the Université de Montréal in Montréal, Canada, in 1972–73. He was also awarded various scholarships such as "Boris Kraigher", "Boris Kidrič" and "Dr. Prešeren Award" (highest available for students) while studying for his Univ. dipl. iur. degree at the Faculty of Law at the University of Ljubljana in Slovenia, between 1966 and 1970.

He has reading, writing and speaking proficiency in English, French, Slovenian, and Croatian as well as limited reading and speaking facility in German and Italian.

== Controversies ==
In August 2017, Zupančič lost Slovenian government's support for his candidacy for membership on the United Nations Human Rights Committee after labelling the French politician Simone Veil "the biggest murderer of all time". The statement was voted to be the Slovenian sexist statement of the year.

In 2023 the Jewish Chronicle published an exposé, detailing antisemitic content Zupančič shared on social media, including sharing conspiracy theories about Jewish influence and power and publication of antisemitic caricatures. After these findings came to light, the conservative think tank European Centre of Law and Justice terminated their relationship with Zupančič and he was locked out of his account on X for breaching its terms of conduct.

== Memberships ==
Judge Zupančič is a member of the editorial board of various journals including REVUS, European Constitutionality Review, Revija 2000 and Dignitas, Ljubljana; Society for the Reform of Criminal Law, Vancouver, Canada; and "Pravni Vjesnik", Osijek, Croatia.

He is also a member of the advisory board of "Nottingham Law Journal", United Kingdom and "European Journal of Law Reform", Utrecht, The Netherlands as well as a member of the Scientific Committee of "Analele Universităţii București, Seria Drept", Bucharest, Romania.

== Publications ==
Judge Zupančič is the author of The Owl of Minerva: Essays on Human Rights, Eleven International Publishing, 2007, which is a collection of his theories on law and human rights. He has also been an author in leading cases of many separate opinions which have been subject to serious academic review. These opinions have been collectively published in The Owlets of Minerva: Human Rights in the Practice of The European Court of Human Rights, Eleven International Publishing, 2011. A detailed review of these books has been published in The International and Comparative Law Quarterly Journal, Vol. 62:2, April 2013, pp 513–515.

Judge Zupančič has also written many scholarly articles on human and constitutional rights including:

- The Owl of Minerva, Essays on Human Rights, book (442 pages), Eleven International Publishing, December 2007.
- The Owlets of Minerva, Human Rights in the Practice of the European Court of Human Rights, book (552 pages), Eleven International Publishing, December 2011
- Challenges of Contemporary International Law and International Relations, Liber Amicorum In Honour Of Ernest Petric, Nova Gorica, 2011, "An Answer to One Crucial Question of Human Rights – An Epistemological Excursus Informing Jalloh v. Germany and Gäfgen v. Germany Cases at the European Court of Human Rights", pp. 451 – 463.
- Relationship of the EU Framework Decision to the ECHR: Towards the Fundamental Principles of Criminal Procedure, Ragnarsbók - Fræðirit um mannréttindi, pp. 32–42.
- Co-author: Relationship of the EU Framework Decision to the ECHR: Towards the fundamental principles of criminal procedure, pp. 265–271, ERA Forum scripta iuris europaei, vol. 8, number 2, Springer, June 2007
- The Privilege against Self-incrimination as a Human Right, Analele Universitatii din Bucuresti, 2007-I (January–March) pp. 1–46
- On Tolerance, Theory and Practice of Contemporary International Law, Essays in Honour of Professor Levan Alexidze on the 80th Anniversary, Inovacia, Tbilisi, pp. 127–137, 2007
- On Universality of Human Rights, the Human Rights. Case-Law of the European Court of Human Rights Journal, The Legal World Publishing House Ltd, in Russian pp. 24–28, in English pp. 76–79, 2007
- Morality of Virtue vs. Morality of Mere Duty or Why do Penalties Require Legal Process whereas Rewards Do Not, Human Rights, Liber Amicorum Luzius Wildhaber, Human Rights – Strasbourg Views / Droits de l'homme – Regards de Strasbourg, NP Engel Publisher, Kehl am Rhein, 2007
- On the Interpretation of Legal Precedents and of the Judgments of the European Court of Human Rights, Hukuk Fakültesi Dergisi, Galatasaray Üniversitesi, 1/2003, pp. 37–57 (February 2004); Annual of German & European Law, vol. II/III, Berghahn Books, pp. 156–170, 2006
- The Privilege against Self-incrimination as a Human Right, European Journal of Law Reform, vol. 8, n° 1/2 (2006), pp. 15–56
- On Legal Formalism: the Principle of Legality in Criminal law, L'interprétation constitutionnelle, Dalloz, 2005, pp. 61–82 (Round-Table of the Association internationale de droit constitutionnel organised on 15 and 16 October 2004 in Bordeaux)
- Interview « Rugalmasan ítéljük meg a tagállamok mérlegelési jogkörét », Hungarian journal Fundamentum 2005/1
- International Adjudication and the Internationalisation of Constitutional Law, 24 (2005) Pravna Praksa pp. I-VIII (in Slovene)
- The Individual Citizen versus the State – Litigation of Constitutional & Human Rights, 12th Annual Conference on "The Individual vs. the State", Central European University, Budapest, June 2004
- O razlagi sodnih precedensov in sodb ter posebej sodb Evropskega sodišča za človekove pravice, Revus 2, Revija za evropsko ustavnost, May 2004 (Slovene)
- Hukuki Emsallerin ve Avrupa Insan Haklari Mahkemesi Kararlarinin Yorumlansmasi (Turkish), Hukuk Fakültesi Dergisi, Galatasaray Üniversitesi, 1/2003, pp. 59–78 (February 2004)
- Eiropas Cilvēktiesību tiesas precedentu un spriedumu interpretācija (Interpretation of Legal Precedents and of the Judgments of the European Court of Human Rights), Likums un Tiesības, Aprīlis, 6. sējums, nr. 4 (56) 2004
- Kazensko pravo in njegov vpliv na normativno integracijo, Pravna Praksa, št. 18-19/2004 (Slovene) the English version of the whole paper entitled "Criminal Law and Its Influence Upon Normative Integration", is available here: https://web.archive.org/web/20160304133709/http://id.erudit.org/revue/ac/1974/v7/n1/017031ar.pdf
- Adjudication and the Rule of Law, European Journal of Law Reform, Vol. V, No. 1/2, 2003, pp. 23–126.
- The Constitutional Law Making – Constitutional Law and the Jurisprudence of the European Court of Human Rights: An Attempt at a Synthesis, Revus 1, Revija za evropsko ustavnost
- Droit constitutionnel et jurisprudence de la Cour européenne des Droits de l'Homme, Revue de Justice constitutionnelle Est-Européenne, numéro spécial 2003, L'influence de la jurisprudence de la Cour européenne des Droits de l'Homme sur l'activité des Cours constitutionnelles d'Europe centrale et orientale, November 2002
- From Combat to Contract: What Does the Constitution Constitute?", European Journal of Law Reform 59-95, 1999, in Czech "Pravnik", 1997; translation and publication in Portuguese in 2001; International Law of XXI Century, To the 80th Anniversary of Professor Ivanovich Lukashuk, Editions Прмени « Promeni », Kyiv, 2006
- CRIMINAL LAW: A CRITIQUE OF THE IDEOLOGY OF PUNISHMENT, Beijing, 2001 (a book translated and published in Chinese)
- Droit Constitutionnel et Jurisprudence de la Cour Européenne des Droits de l'Homme, article in XVIe Annuaire International de Justice constitutionnelle, 2000, prof. Louis Favoreu, Ed., Economica, Paris 2001
- Access to Court, Nottingham Law Journal, December 2000
- The Crown and the Criminal: Towards the General Principles of Criminal Procedure, 9 European Review of Public Law, 11–39, 1997
- CRIMINAL LAW, Seton Hall, 358 pages (Advanced Criminal Law textbook), 1986
- CRIMINAL PROCEDURE: A Theoretical Vademecum, Seton Hall, 400 pages (textbook), 1985
- Criminal Responsibility under Mistake of Law: the Real Reasons, 13th American Journal of Criminal Law, 37–66, 1985
- CRIMINAL LAW: ITS NATURE AND ITS FUNCTION, New York, 401 pages, 1983 (published in Chinese in 2000)
- Truth and Impartiality in Criminal Process, 8 Journal of Contemporary Law, 39-133, 1982
- CRIMINAL LAW: THE CONFLICT AND THE RULES (S.J.D. Dissertation, Harvard Law School), New York (296 pages, published as articles), 1981
- The Privilege against Self-Incrimination, Arizona State Law Journal (1981:1), 1-25
- On Legal Formalism: The Principle of Legality in Criminal Law, 27 Loyola Law Review, 356–369, 1981
- Criminal Law and its Influence upon Normative Integration, Masters Thesis, Harvard Law School, 7 Acta Criminologica, Montréal, Canada, Spring 1974 (.pdf original available on Internet)
- In Slovene: About twenty longer legal treatises, numerous short articles, essays, interviews, etc.

Summary of Publications in Slovene (1986-2009)

- CRIMINAL PROCEDURE, Casebook, Five editions: 1986, 1987, 1989, 1991, and 1994
- ANALYSIS OF A COURT MARTIAL CRIMINAL PROCESS, 1988 (262 pages) – Co-author and Editor
- FREEDOM OF ASSOCIATION, 1990 (321 pages) – Co-author and Editor
- BEING AND LONGING, A BOOK OF PHILOSOPHICAL AND PSYCHOANALYTICAL ESSAYS (1988 and 1990)
- TEMBATSU, druga od suhih krav, 2011(247 pages)
- LAW AND RIGHT, Essays, 1991
- FROM MADNESS TO BENISON, Essays (1992)
- ELEMENTS OF LEGAL CULTURE, book containing legal and sociological essays (1995)
- CONSTITUTIONAL CRIMINAL PROCEDURE CASEBOOK (1996) (915 pages); 2nd edition (1100 pages) 1999 (Editor)
- "THE FIRST OF THE MEAGRE COWS", Ljubljana 2009, 400 pages, dealing with environmental protection as a human right
