= Peter Čeferin =

Slovenian lawyer

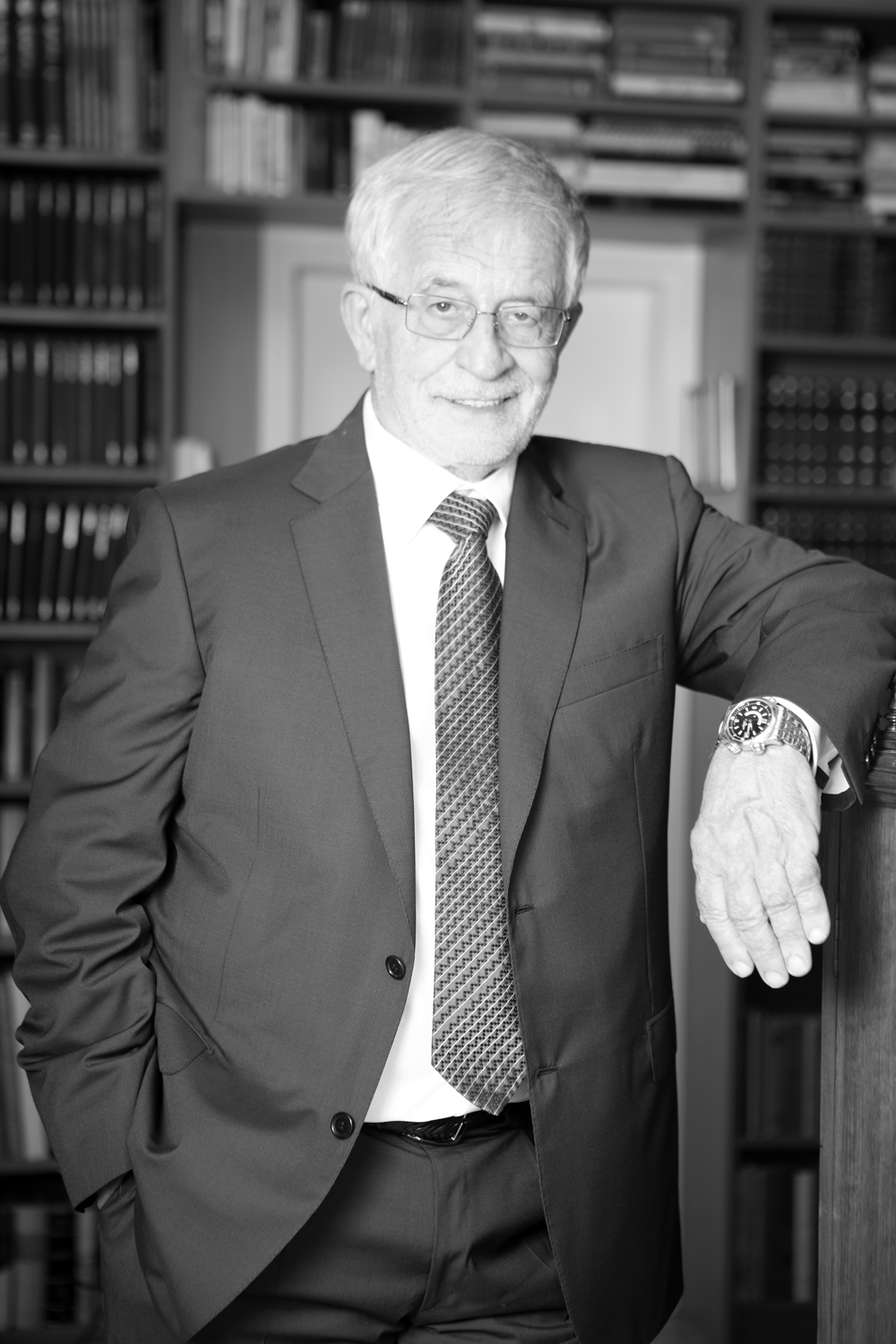

Personal details
- Born: 28 June 1938 (age 88) Ljubljana, Yugoslavia (now Slovenia)
- Spouse: Ana Čeferin (m. 1964–2002)
- Children: 3, including Aleksander and Rok
- Education: University of Ljubljana
- Profession: Attorney

Peter Čeferin (born 28 June 1938) is a Slovenian attorney and the author of articles on issues related to the legal profession, specifically the position and profession of practicing attorneys. He is the father of Aleksander Čeferin.

== Early life and education ==
Čeferin was born in 1938 in Ljubljana to Anica Čeferin (born Kačnik) and Emil Čeferin. His father was a lawyer and an expert in agricultural cooperative law and a professor the University of Ljubljana. Čeferin earned his baccalaureate at a classical secondary school (gymnasium) in 1956 and enrolled at the Faculty of law, University of Ljubljana the same year, where he graduated in 1960. Čeferin began his independent practice as an attorney in 1967. In 1986 he completed his Master's degree at the Faculty of Law, University of Ljubljana, and successfully defended his doctoral thesis – Odvetnik, njegova neodvisnost nekoč in danes, posebej v Sloveniji [The Attorney, His Independence in the Past and Today, With Particular Regard to Slovenia] – in 1988.

== Career ==
After graduation, Čeferin worked as a journalist, and was also engaged in playwriting. The Ljubljana City Theatre staged two of his satires as part of the literary-satirical cabaret Smeh ni greh [Laughter is not a Sin]: Srečka [The Lottery Ticket] and Pridržanje do iztreznitve [Detained until Sober].

He has worked as an attorney since 1967. In 1993 he founded the Law Firm Čeferin together with his two sons Rok Čeferin and Aleksander Čeferin. He works principally in the domains of criminal law and constitutional law and personal (human) rights law.

Čeferin was a member of the Council for the Protection of Human Rights in the period before Slovenia's independence (1991), and Vice President of the Bar Association of Slovenia from 1985 to 1989. In 1989 Čeferin organised the contentious legal defence by a group of Slovenian attorneys of a striking miners in Kosovo, in a wider case known as the Vllasi case, a politically-driven procedure launched against Azem Vllasi and others prosecuted for their alleged spearheading of a crippling nationwide strike staged by the miners (1989 Kosovo miners strike). With their strike action the miners were accused of violating and undermining the state constitution of Yugoslavia. After a process that lasted several months the court ruled with a verdict of not guilty. From 1991 to 1995 he was also a member of the National Council of the Republic of Slovenia. Dr. Čeferin initiated a change to the Police Act, according to which suspects acquired the right to the help of an attorney already upon first dealings with the police – not only once the prosecution process had begun, which had been the case up until then. In the years 2003–2005 Čeferin was publicly recognised as one of the ten most influential lawyers in Slovenia. In September 2014, the Bar Association of Slovenia presented Čeferin with the highest honour for his life work as an attorney, the Danilo Majaron Medal, for his outstanding achievements in the development of the attorney's profession. In January 2018, Peter Čeferin won the case he brought before the European Court of Human Rights, Čeferin vs Slovenia (App 40975/08), wherein the court decided that the Republic of Slovenia had violated his freedom of speech when it fined him for his critical statements directed at the court and the expert witnesses.

He is the author of professional and scientific monographs, including Neodvisnost odvetnika [The Independence of the Attorney] (Uradni list SR Slovenije, 1988), The Bar Association of Slovenia. Excerpts from History (The Bar Association of Slovenia, 2014) and Odvetništvo na Slovenskem: Od habsburške monarhije do neodvisne države [The Barrister's Profession in Slovenia: From the Habsburg Monarchy to the Independent State] (Litera, 2016). Čeferin is also the author of a number of literary works, collections of short stories that focus largely on his career work as an attorney: Moje odvetniško življenje [My Life as an Attorney] (Cankarjeva založba 2012), Valat [Euchre] (Litera 2013), Moje zgodbe [My Stories] (Litera 2014) 100 sodnijskih [100 from the Court] (Litera 2015) and "Prepoznava" in druge zgodbe (Litera 2016). Peter Čeferin, in collaboration with writer and journalist Vasja Jager, also wrote the crime novel Sodni dnevi [Judgment Days] (published by Cankarjeva založba, 2019). The novel focusses on a legal case on which Čeferin worked extensively as an attorney and is based on real events. The book was translated into Serbian and published in 2020.

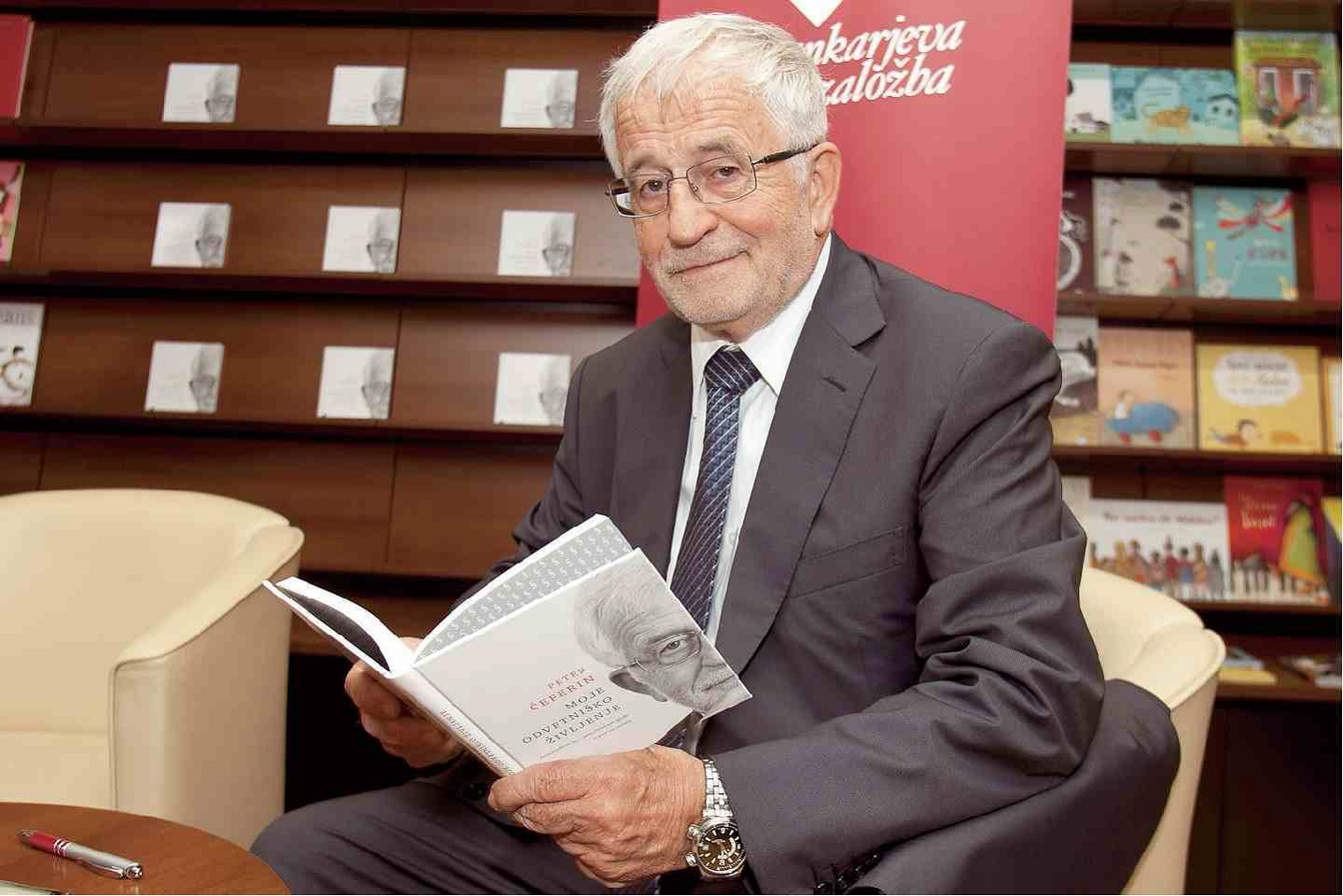
At the book presentation: Moje odvetniško življenje [My Life as an Attorney]

In 2018, Slovenian writer Tadej Golob wrote a biography about Dr. Peter Čeferin with title Nespodobni odvetnik (Didakta 2018), The book was translated into English (Indecent Attorney, Didakta, 2018). In May 2021, Peter Čeferin was awarded the title of Honorary Citizen of the City of Ljubljana.
