= Ernest Petrič =

Slovenian judge and diplomat (born 1936)

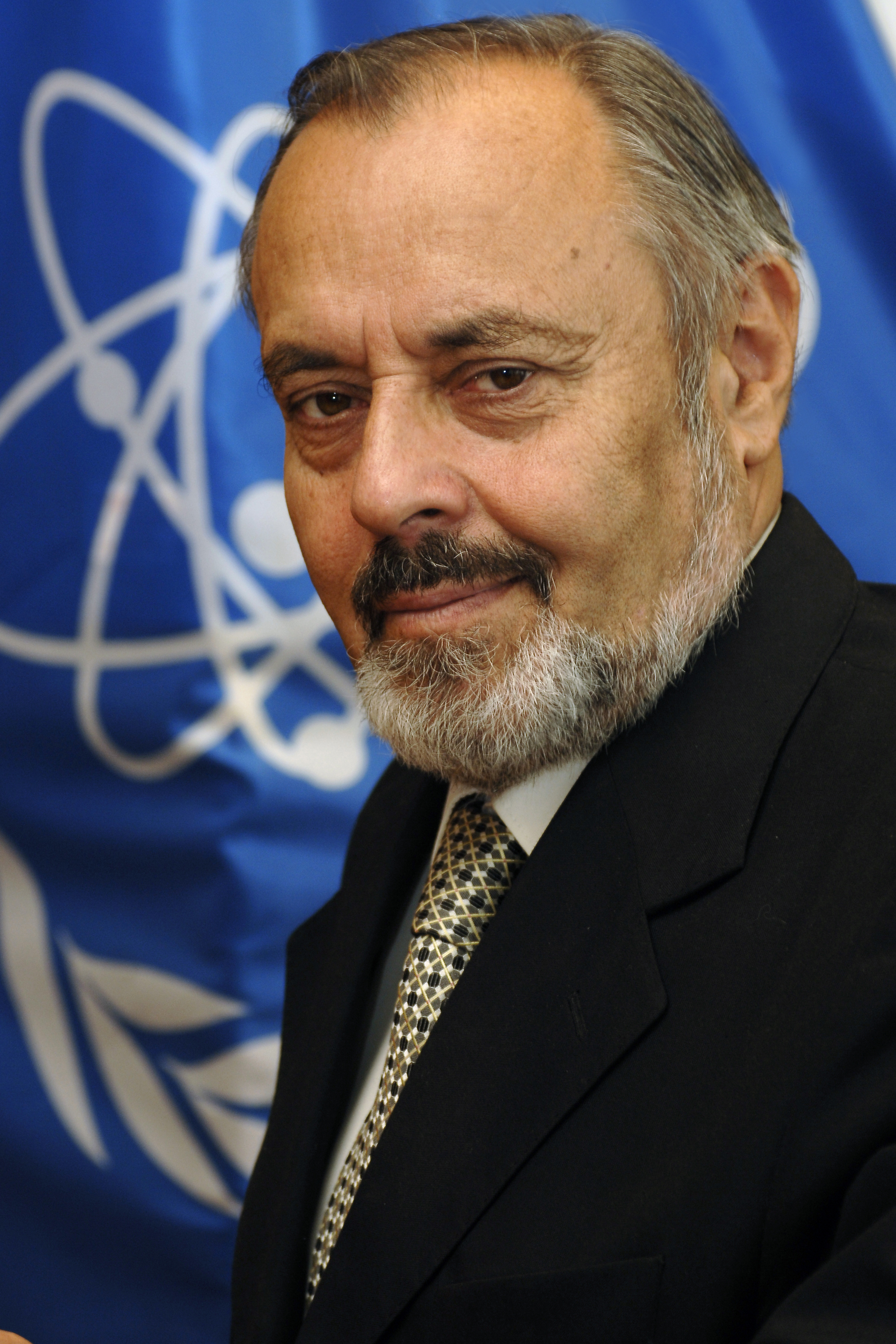

Judge Constitutional Court of Slovenia
- Incumbent
- Assumed office 25 April 2008

President of the Constitutional Court of Slovenia
- In office 11 November 2010 – 10 November 2013
- Succeeded by: Miroslav Mozetič

Chair of the Board of Governors IAEA
- In office 2006–2007
- Preceded by: Yukiya Amano
- Succeeded by: Milenko Skoknic

member International Law Commission UN
- In office 2007–2016

Personal details
- Born: 1936 (age 89–90) Slovenia
- Spouse: married
- Children: 3
- Education: Ljubljana Law School
- Occupation: Judge; Jurist; Diplomat
- Website: Constitutional Court Republic of Slovenia

Ernest Petrič (1936) is a Slovenian judge, jurist, professor, and diplomat.

== Career ==
He began his career at the Institute for National Issues (1961–1964). From 1967 to 1972, he served on the Executive Council of the Slovene government. He was with the University of Ljubljana from 1976 to 1988 in capacity of professor, vice dean and finally dean. From 1983 to 1986, he was with the Addis Ababa University as a professor of International Law. From 1989, he began serving as an ambassador, including the United States, India, and Austria, and, as a non-resident, Nepal, Mexico, and Brazil. He is an ambassador to the UN, IAEA, UNIDO, CTBTO, ODC, and OECD. As UN ambassador, he has served as elected president of the International Law Commission. For three years beginning in 1997 he served the Ministry of Foreign Affairs as its state secretary. From 2010 to 2013, he was president of the Slovenian Constitutional Court. Since 2017 he has served as a senior advisor to the president of Slovenia.

== Memberships ==
Petrič is a member of the European Academy of Sciences and Arts.

== Awards ==
Petrič won the Prešeren University Award.

== Bibliography ==
Books

- Petrič, Ernest (1966). The rights of national minorities as defined in the statutes of the communes. Ljubljana: Inštitut za narodnostna vprašanja. pp. 75–102. ISSN 0034-0251. OCLC 442596343.
- Petrič, Ernest (1976). The principle of the right of peoples to self-determination. Thessaloniki: Institute of International Public Law and International Relations of Thessaloniki.
- Petrič, Ernest (1977). Mednarodnopravno varstvo narodnih manjšin. Sociološka in politološka knjižnica (in Slovenian). Vol. 7. Maribor: Zalozba Obzorja. p. 426.
- Petrič, Ernest; Pavel, Slamič; Karel, Šiškovič (1981). La positione giuridica internazionale della minoranza slovena in Italia. Gli Sloveni in Italia (in Italian). Trieste: Editoriale stampa triestina. p. 141.
- Petrič, Ernest (1984). Pravica do samoodločbe : mednarodni vidiki. Sociološka in politološka knjižnica (in Slovenian). Vol. 16. Maribor: Obzorja. p. 301.
- Rahten, Andrej; Šumrada, Janez; Petrič, Ernest; Oven, Jacqueline; Leskovar, Matej, translator; Bataković, Dušan T.; Granda, Stane; Maver, Aleš, 1978- (2011), Velikih pet in nastanek Kraljevine Srbov, Hrvatov in Slovencev = Les cinq grands et la création du Royaume des Serbes, Croates et Slovènes / Andrej Rahten, Janez Šumrada (ur., éds.); [prevodi Jacqueline Oven, Matej Leskovar], Studia diplomatica Slovenica (in Slovenian and French), vol. 2, Loka pri Mengšu, Ljubljana: Center za evropsko prihodnost, Znanstvenoraziskovalni center Slovenske akademije znanosti in umetnosti, p. 479, ISBN 978-961-92839-3-6, ISSN 1855-9174
- Petrič, Ernest (January 22, 2013). Foreign Policy: From Conception to Diplomatic Practice. Leiden: Martinus Nijhoff. p. 318. ISBN 978-90-04-24549-5.
- Petrič, Ernest (January 22, 2013). Foreign Policy: From Conception to Diplomatic Practice. Leiden: Martinus Nijhoff. p. 318. ISBN 978-90-04-24550-1. eBook
