= Supreme Court of Slovenia =

National supreme court

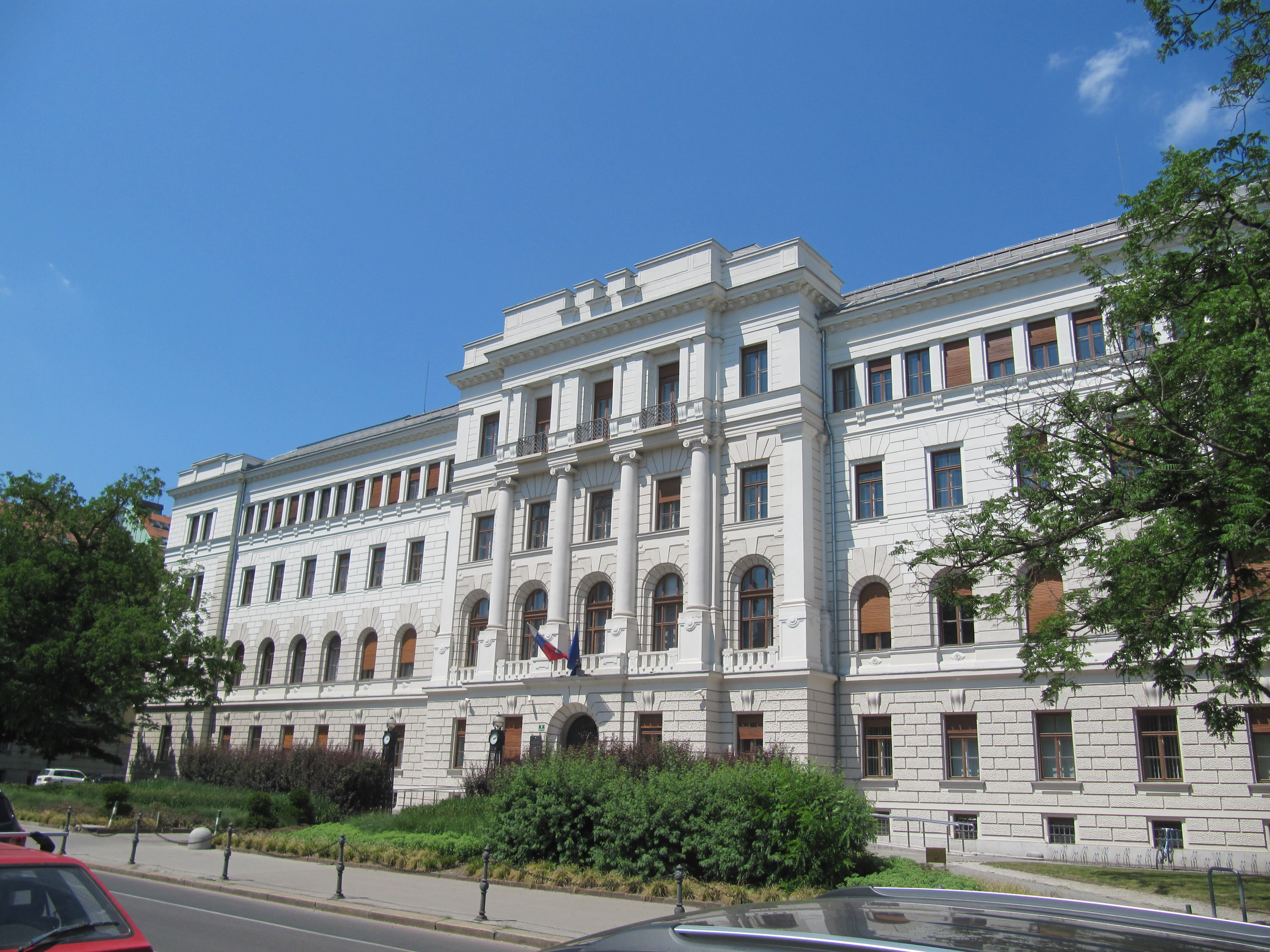
Supreme Court of Slovenia in Ljubljana

The Supreme Court of the Republic of Slovenia (Vrhovno sodišče Republike Slovenije) is, according to Article 127 of the Constitution, the highest court in Slovenia. Its seat is in Ljubljana. The court's current president is Damijan Florjančič. Decisions of the Supreme Court can be reviewed by the Constitutional Court if human rights, guaranteed by the constitution or by the European Convention on Human Rights are violated.

The supreme court judges enjoy a permanent mandate.

== History ==
The Supreme Court of the Republic of Slovenia was formally established on 23 December 1991. In practice, the Supreme Court has operated since 25 June 1991 when Slovenia gained independence from Yugoslavia.

== See also ==
- Judiciary of Slovenia
