= Constitutional Court of Slovenia =

National constitutional court

Constitutional Court of the Republic of Slovenia
- Ustavno sodišče Republike Slovenije
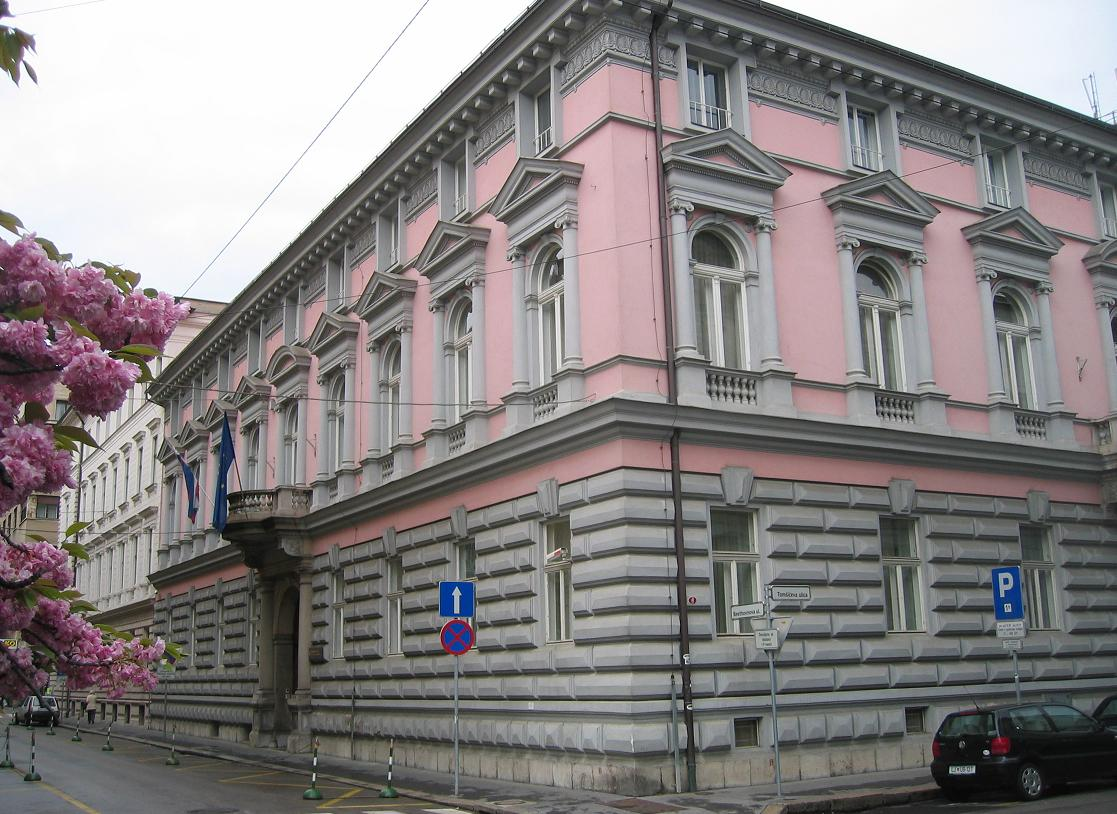
- Interactive map of Constitutional Court of the Republic of Slovenia
- Established: 1991
- Jurisdiction: Republic of Slovenia
- Location: Ljubljana, Slovenia
- Composition method: Election by National Assembly of Slovenia
- Authorised by: Constitution of Slovenia
- Judge term length: 9 years (no mandatory retirement)
- Number of positions: 9
- Website: https://www.us-rs.si

President
- Currently: Dr. Rok Čeferin
- Since: 19 December 2024

Vice President
- Currently: Dr. Neža Kogovšek Šalamon
- Since: 19 December 2024

The Constitutional Court of Slovenia (in Slovene: Ustavno sodišče Republike Slovenije, US RS) is a special court established by the Slovenian Constitution. Since its inception, the Court has been located in the city of Ljubljana. It is the highest court in the country for reviewing the constitutionality and protection of human rights and fundamental freedoms, otherwise the highest court in the country is the Supreme Court of the Republic of Slovenia. The constitutional court is not part of any branch of government (not even the judiciary) and is an independent state body.

The main responsibilities of the Constitutional Court include:

- reviewing the constitutionality and legality of laws and other regulations,
- deciding on constitutional complaints (violations of human rights) against the decisions of other state bodies,
- and certain other responsibilities related to elections and jurisdiction.

The seat of the Court is in Ljubljana in a Plečnik's Palace, designed by a famous Slovenian architect Jože Plečnik.

== Jurisdiction ==
Most powers of the Constitutional Court are explicitly determined by the Constitution. In accordance with the Constitution (§160), the Constitutional Court decides on:

- the conformity of laws with the Constitution and of laws and other regulations with ratified treaties and with the general principles of international law;
- the conformity of regulations with the Constitution and with laws;
- the conformity of local community regulations with the Constitution and with laws;
- the conformity of general acts issued for the exercise of public authority with the Constitution, laws, and regulations;
- constitutional complaints stemming from the violation of human rights and fundamental freedoms by individual acts;
- on jurisdictional disputes between the state and local communities and among local communities themselves; between courts and other state authorities; and between the National Assembly, the President of the Republic, and the Government;
- the unconstitutionality of the acts and activities of political parties;
- other matters vested by the Constitution (e.g. deciding on an impeachment charges against the prime minister or president; conformity of international treaties with the Constitution before its ratification; appeals against a National Assembly decision on the election of Slovenian members to the European Parliament; admissibility of a National Assembly decision not to call a referendum on the confirmation of constitutional amendments; ).

== Procedures ==
The Constitutional Court has several strictly defined procedures in which cases may be brought before it. Procedures are regulated by the Constitutional Court Act.

Constitutional Court decides by a majority vote of all its judges unless otherwise provided for individual cases by the Constitution or law. Decisions of the Court are binding for all.

=== Procedure for the review of the constitutionality and legality ===
The procedure for the review of the constitutionality and legality of regulations and general acts issued for the exercise of public authority is initiated by:

1. submission of a written request by an applicant (specific state bodies); or
2. by a Constitutional Court order on the acceptance of a petition by a private citizen, whose legal interests were affected, to initiate a review procedure.

Written request can be submitted by any court, the National Assembly, one third of MPs, the National Council, the Government, the Ombudsman, the Information Commissioner, the Bank of Slovenia, the State Prosecutor General, representative bodies of local communities, a representative association of local communities, and national representative trade unions.

In this procedure the Court may:

- find that the law or other regulation is in conformity with the Constitution or law;
- in whole or in part abrogate an Act which is not in conformity with the Constitution;
- annul or abrogate other regulations (Act cannot be annulled or abrogated).

=== Constitutional complaint ===
Constitutional complaint is possible in case of to a violation of human rights or fundamental freedoms against individual acts of state or local authorities.

A complaint may be lodged by:

- an individual whose were violated; or
- the Ombudsman in connection with an individual case that he is dealing with.

Complaint is not allowed until after all legal remedies have been exhausted.

In this procedure the Court may:

- dismiss a constitutional complaint as unfounded;
- in whole or in part annuls or abrogates the individual act, and remands the case to the authority competent to decide thereon.

== Landmark decisions ==
=== The Erased (U-I-284/94) ===
The case concerned the removal of citizens of other former Yugoslav republics from the Slovenian Register of Permanent Residents following Slovenia's independence in 1991. The Constitutional Court examined the legal consequences of transferring these individuals from the register of permanent residents to the register of foreigners without adequately regulating their legal status. It found that the legislation failed to provide sufficient legal protection and violated constitutional principles, particularly equality before the law, legal certainty and the protection of human rights. The Court required the legislature to remedy the unconstitutional situation. The judgment became an important precedent concerning the protection of individuals whose legal status was affected by the transition to Slovenian independence.

=== Tito Street (U-I-109/10) ===
The case concerned a Ljubljana municipal council decision to name a street after former Yugoslav president Josip Broz Tito. The Constitutional Court examined whether such a decision was compatible with the constitutional principle of human dignity and the values underlying the Slovenian constitutional order. It concluded that the naming of the street was unconstitutional because Tito symbolised a former political regime associated with serious violations of human rights and fundamental freedoms. The Court held that the constitutional principle of human dignity places substantive limits on the decisions of public authorities, including local governments. The judgment is significant for its interpretation of human dignity as a foundational constitutional value and its application to public symbolic acts. It explains the limits of majority voting in a constitutional democracy, where majority cannot breach the Constitution with their decisions.

=== Marriage equality and same-sex adoption (U-I-486/20 and Up-572/18) ===
The Constitutional Court examined legal provisions that reserved marriage for different-sex couples and excluded same-sex couples in formal civil unions from joint adoption. It concluded that these distinctions constituted unconstitutional discrimination based on sexual orientation. The Court emphasised that same-sex couples must enjoy equal legal protection and that their exclusion could not be justified by the constitutional protection of marriage and family life. It required the relevant legislation to be interpreted and amended in accordance with the principle of equality. The judgment represented an important development in Slovenian constitutional jurisprudence concerning human dignity, non-discrimination and the legal recognition of same-sex families.

== Composition ==
The court consists of 9 judges, who are elected by the National Assembly of the Republic of Slovenia for a non-renewable 9-year term on the proposal of the President of the Republic. Before replacing a judge after the end of their term, a new judge must first be elected. If this does not happen by the end of the judge's term, that judge's term will be extended until a new judge is elected (e.g. judge Dunja Jadek Pensa served for more than 10 years before political consensus was reached to elect judge Rok Svetlič in 2021).

Judges are elected from among legal experts, who are Slovenian citizens and at least 40 years of age, but they do not have to meet the conditions that apply to the election of judges of regular courts. Among other things, the judges of the Constitutional Court do not need a state legal exam, which allows, for example, university professors to be elected as judges of the court.

After election, a new judge must take the following oath before the National Assembly: "I swear that I shall judge according to the Constitution, the law, and my conscience and that I shall strive with all my power for constitutionality, legality, and the protection of human rights and fundamental freedoms."

Judges elect a president and vice-president of the Court among themselves for a term of three years by a secret ballot.

=== List of judges ===
#	Judge	Term			Succession	Nominated by	Election	Other positions
1	Janez Šinkovec, PhD (1928-2016)	25 June 1991	8 January 1998	6 years, 197 days	1	President Milan Kučan	Assembly of the Republic of Slovenia	
2	Lovro Šturm, PhD (1938-2021)	25 June 1991	19 December 1998	7 years, 177 days	1	President Milan Kučan	Assembly of the Republic of Slovenia	President (1997–1998)
3	Peter Jambrek, PhD (1940-)	25 June 1991	19 December 1998	7 years, 177 days	1	President Milan Kučan	Assembly of the Republic of Slovenia	President (1991–1994)
4	Anton Perenič, PhD (1941-)	25 June 1991	30 September 1992	1 year, 97 days	1	President Milan Kučan	Assembly of the Republic of Slovenia	
5	Anton (Tone) Jerovšek, PhD (1941-)	25 June 1991	19 December 1998	7 years, 177 days	1	President Milan Kučan	Assembly of the Republic of Slovenia	President (1994–1997)
6	Matevž Krivic (1942-)	25 June 1991	19 December 1998	7 years, 177 days	1	President Milan Kučan	Assembly of the Republic of Slovenia	
7	Janez Snoj (1934-2005)	12 February 1992	31 March 1998	6 years, 47 days	1	President Milan Kučan	Assembly of the Republic of Slovenia	
8	Lojze Ude, PhD (1936-)	25 May 1993	24 May 2002	8 years, 364 days	1	President Milan Kučan	1st National Assembly (8th Session, 25 May 1993)	Vice-President (1998-2001)
9	Boštjan M. Zupančič, PhD (1947-)	25 May 1993	31 October 1998	7 years, 128 days	1	President Milan Kučan	1st National Assembly (8th Session, 25 May 1993)	
10	Franc Testen (1948-)	25 May 1993	24 May 2002	8 years, 364 days	2 - Succeeding Judge (4) Perenič	President Milan Kučan	1st National Assembly (8th Session, 25 May 1993)	President (1998-2001); Vice-President (1994-1997)
11	Miroslava Geč-Korošec, PhD (1939-2002)	9 January 1998	1 October 2000	2 years, 266 days	2 - Succeeding Judge (1) Šinkovec	President Milan Kučan	2nd National Assembly (17th Extr. Session, 16 December 1997)	Vice-President (1997-1998)
12	Dragica Wedam Lukić, PhD (1949-)	1 April 1998	31 March 2007	8 years, 364 days	2 - Succeeding Judge (7) Snoj	President Milan Kučan	2nd National Assembly (17th Extr. Session, 16 December 1997)	President (2001-2004)
13	Janez Čebulj, PhD (1957-)	31 October 1998	27 March 2008	9 years, 148 days	2 - Succeeding Judge (3) Jambrek	President Milan Kučan	2nd National Assembly (10th Session, 28 July 1998)	President (2004-2007); Vice-President (2001-2004); Secretary-General (1993-1998)
14	Lojze Janko (1943-)	31 October 1998	31 October 2007	9 years, 0 days	2 - Succeeding Judge (6) Krivic	President Milan Kučan	2nd National Assembly (10th Session, 28 July 1998)	Vice-President (1998)
15	Mirjam Škrk, PhD (1947-2026)	31 October 1998	27 March 2008	8 years, 364 days	2 - Succeeding Judge (2) Šturm	President Milan Kučan	2nd National Assembly (28th Extr. Session, 28 October 1998)	Vice-President (2004-2007)
16	Milojka Modrijan (1945-)	1 November 1998	20 November 2007	8 years, 364 days	2 - Succeeding Judge (9) Zupančič	President Milan Kučan	2nd National Assembly (10th Session, 28 July 1998)	
17	Zvonko Fišer, PhD (1949-)	18 December 1998	27 March 2008	9 years, 100 days	2 - Succeeding Judge (5) Jerovšek	President Milan Kučan	2nd National Assembly (30th Extr. Session, 18 December 1998)	
19	Ciril Ribičič, PhD (1947-)	19 December 2000	18 December 2009	8 years, 364 days	3 - Succeeding Judge (11) Geč-Korošec	President Janez Drnovšek	3rd National Assembly (3rd Extr. Session, 19 December 2000)	Vice-President (2007-2009)
20	Jože Tratnik (1941-)	25 May 2002	17 July 2011	9 years, 53 days	2 - Succeeding Judge (8) Ude	President Janez Drnovšek	3rd National Assembly (16th Session, 23 May 2002)	President (2007-2010)
21	Marija Krisper Kramberger (1946-)	25 May 2002	13 September 2010	8 years, 111 days	3 - Succeeding Judge (10) Testen	President Janez Drnovšek	3rd National Assembly (14th Session, 26 March 2002)	
18	Franc Grad, PhD (1948-)	1 April 2007	31 January 2008	305 days	3 - Succeeding Judge (12) Wedam Lukić	President Janez Drnovšek	4th National Assembly (24th Session, 2 February 2007)	
22	Miroslav Mozetič (1950-)	31 October 2007	30 October 2016	8 years, 365 days	3 - Succeeding Judge (14) Janko	President Janez Drnovšek	4th National Assembly (32nd Session, 25 October 2007)	President (2013-2016); Vice-President (2010-2013)
23	Marta Klampfer (1953-2016)	20 November 2007	19 November 2016	8 years, 365 days	3 - Succeeding Judge (16) Modrijan	President Janez Drnovšek	4th National Assembly (33rd Session, 20 November 2007)	
24	Mitja Deisinger, PhD (1942-)	27 March 2008	26 March 2017	8 years, 364 days	3 - Succeeding Judge (17) Fišer	President Danilo Türk	4th National Assembly (26th Session, 27 March 2008)	
25	Jasna Pogačar (1953-)	27 March 2008	26 March 2017	8 years, 364 days	3 - Succeeding Judge (13) Čebulj	President Danilo Türk	4th National Assembly (26th Session, 27 March 2008)	
26	Jan Zobec (1954-)	27 March 2008	26 March 2017	8 years, 364 days	4 - Succeeding Judge (18) Grad	President Danilo Türk	4th National Assembly (26th Session, 27 March 2008)	
27	Ernest Petrič, PhD (1936-)	25 April 2008	24 April 2017	8 years, 364 days	3 - Succeeding Judge (15) Škrk	President Danilo Türk	4th National Assembly (26th Session, 27 March 2008)	President (2010-2013)
28	Jadranka Sovdat, PhD (1960-)	19 December 2009	18 December 2018	8 years, 364 days	4 - Succeeding Judge (19) Ribičič	President Danilo Türk	5th National Assembly (12th Session, 17 December 2009)	President (2016-2018); Vice-President (2013-2016); Secretary-General (1999-2009)
29	Etelka Korpič-Horvat, PhD (1948-)	29 September 2010	27 September 2019	8 years, 363 days	4 - Succeeding Judge (21) Krisper Kramberger	President Danilo Türk	5th National Assembly (20th Session, 28 September 2010)	Vice-President (2016-2019)
30	Dunja Jadek Pensa, PhD (1959-)	15 July 2011	9 November 2021	10 years, 117 days	3 - Succeeding Judge (20) Tratnik	President Danilo Türk	5th National Assembly (30th Session, 15 July 2011)	
31	Špelca Mežnar, PhD (1976-)	31 October 2016	30 October 2025	8 years, 364 days	4 - Succeeding Judge (22) Mozetič	President Borut Pahor	7th National Assembly (21st Session, 12 July 2016)	
32	Marko Šorli (1946-)	20 November 2016	19 November 2025	8 years, 364 days	4 - Succeeding Judge (23) Klampfer	President Borut Pahor	7th National Assembly (21st Session, 12 July 2016)	
33	Marijan Pavčnik, PhD (1946-)	27 March 2017	31 December 2022	5 years, 279 days	4 - Succeeding Judge (24) Deisinger	President Borut Pahor	7th National Assembly (28th Session, 22 March 2017)	
34	Matej Accetto, PhD (1974-)	27 March 2017	26 March 2026	8 years, 364 days	4 - Succeeding Judge (25) Pogačar	President Borut Pahor	7th National Assembly (28th Session, 22 March 2017)	President (2021–2024); Vice-President (2019-2021)
35	Klemen Jaklič, PhD, PhD (1975-)	27 March 2017	26 March 2026	8 years, 364 days	5 - Succeeding Judge (26) Zobec	President Borut Pahor	7th National Assembly (28th Session, 22 March 2017)	
36	Rajko Knez, PhD (1969-)	25 April 2017	24 April 2026	8 years, 364 days	4 - Succeeding Judge (27) Petrič	President Borut Pahor	7th National Assembly (28th Session, 22 March 2017)	President (2018–2021)
37	Katja Šugman Stubbs, PhD (1966-)	19 December 2018	Incumbent	7 years, 319 days	5 - Succeeding Judge (28) Sovdat	President Borut Pahor	8th National Assembly (2nd Session, 27 November 2018)	
38	Rok Čeferin, PhD (1964-)	27 September 2019	Incumbent	7 years, 37 days	5 - Succeeding Judge (29) Korpič-Horvat	President Borut Pahor	8th National Assembly (9th Session, 18 June 2019)	President (2024-); Vice-President (2021-2024)
39	Rok Svetlič, PhD (1973-)	10 November 2021	Incumbent	4 years, 358 days	4 - Succeeding Judge (30) Jadek Pensa	President Borut Pahor	8th National Assembly (86th Extr. Session, 10 November 2021)	
40	Neža Kogovšek Šalamon, PhD (1978-)	1 January 2023	Incumbent	3 years, 306 days	5 - Succeeding Judge (33) Pavčnik	President Borut Pahor	9th National Assembly (3rd Session, 27 October 2022)	Vice-President (2024-)
41	Nina Betetto	31 October 2025	Incumbent	1 year, 3 days	5 - Succeeding Judge (31) Mežnar	President Nataša Pirc Musar	9th National Assembly (34th Session, 25 September 2025)	
42	Primož Gorkič, PhD	20 November 2025	Incumbent	348 days	5 - Succeeding Judge (32) Šorli	President Nataša Pirc Musar	9th National Assembly (34th Session, 25 September 2025)	
43	Tamara Kek	27 March 2026	Incumbent	221 days	5 - Succeeding Judge (34) Accetto	President Nataša Pirc Musar	9th National Assembly (38th Session, 3 February 2026)	
44	Marko Starman	27 March 2026	Incumbent	221 days	6 - Succeeding Judge (35) Jaklič	President Nataša Pirc Musar	9th National Assembly (38th Session, 3 February 2026)	
45	Barbara Kresal, PhD	25 April 2026	Incumbent	192 days	5 - Succeeding Judge (36) Knez	President Nataša Pirc Musar	9th National Assembly (38th Session, 3 February 2026)	

== Presidents and vice-presidents of the Court ==
This is a list of the presidents and vice-presidents of the Constitutional Court of Slovenia. The president and vice-president are elected by the judges of the Constitutional Court from among their own members for a three-year term.

=== List of presidents of the Court ===
#	Judge	Term	
1	Peter Jambrek, PhD	25 June 1991	24 April 1994
2	Tone Jerovšek, PhD	25 April 1994	24 April 1997
3	Lovro Šturm, PhD	25 April 1997	30 October 1998
4	Franc Testen	11 November 1998	10 November 2001
5	Dragica Wedam Lukić, PhD	11 November 2001	10 November 2004
6	Janez Čebulj, PhD	11 November 2004	10 November 2007
7	Jože Tratnik	11 November 2007	10 November 2010
8	Ernest Petrič, PhD	11 November 2010	10 November 2013
9	Miroslav Mozetič	11 November 2013	30 October 2016
10	Jadranka Sovdat, PhD	31 October 2016	18 December 2018
11	Rajko Knez, PhD	18 December 2018	18 December 2021
12	Matej Accetto, PhD	19 December 2021	18 December 2024
13	Rok Čeferin, PhD	19 December 2024	Incumbent

=== List of vice-presidents of the Court ===
#	Judge	Term	
1	Franc Testen	25 April 1994	24 April 1998
2	Janez Šinkovec, PhD	25 April 1997	8 January 1998
3	Matevž Krivic	9 January 1998	30 October 1998
4	Lojze Ude, PhD	12 December 1998	10 November 2001
5	Janez Čebulj, PhD	11 November 2001	10 November 2004
6	Mirjam Škrk, PhD	11 November 2004	10 November 2007
7	Ciril Ribičič, PhD	11 November 2007	18 December 2009
8	Miroslav Mozetič	11 January 2010	10 November 2013
9	Jadranka Sovdat, PhD	11 November 2013	30 October 2016
10	Etelka Korpič-Horvat, PhD	31 October 2016	27 September 2019
11	Matej Accetto, PhD	28 September 2019	15 December 2021
12	Rok Čeferin, PhD	15 December 2021	15 December 2024
13	Neža Kogovšek Šalamon, PhD	16 December 2024	Incumbent

== Secretaries-General of the Court ==
This is a list of the Secretaries-General of the Constitutional Court of Slovenia. The Secretary-General serves as the registrar and chief administrative officer of the court. Janez Čebulj and Jadranka Sovdat later also served as judges of the court, and both were elected vice-president and, subsequently, president of the court.

#	Secretary-General	Term	
1	Milan Baškovič	25 June 1991	28 February 1993
2	Janez Čebulj, PhD	1 May 1993	30 October 1998
3	Jadranka Sovdat, PhD	29 January 1999	18 December 2009
4	Erik Kerševan, PhD	1 February 2010	31 July 2012
5	Sebastian Nerad, PhD	3 October 2012	Incumbent

== See also ==
- Constitution
- Constitutionalism
- Constitutional economics
- Jurisprudence
- Judiciary
- Rule of law
- Rule According to Higher Law
