= Megola =

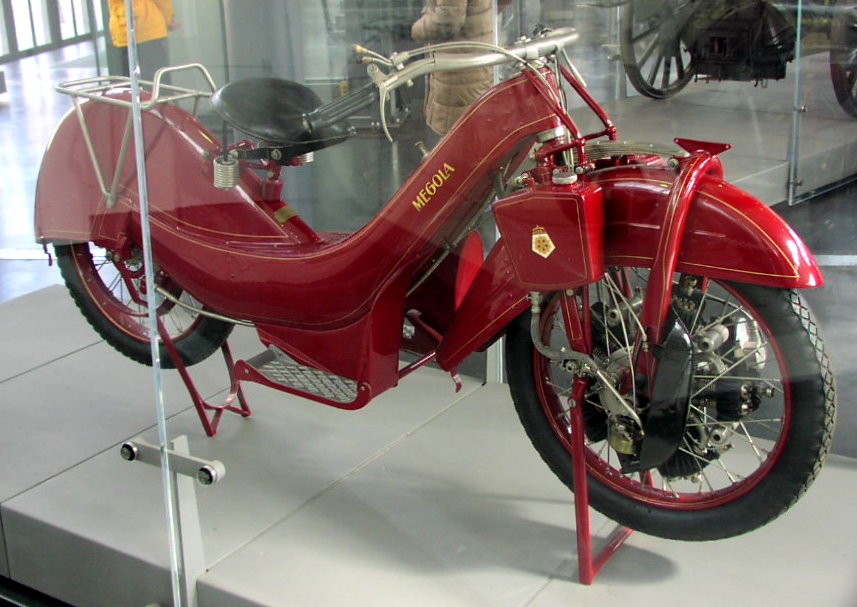
- A Megola sport motorcycle, displayed at the Deutsches Museum, Munich, 2007
- Production: 1921–1925
- Assembly: Munich, Germany
- Engine: Five-cylinder flathead rotary
- Bore / stroke: 52 mm × 60 mm (2.0 in × 2.4 in)
- Top speed: 85 km/h (53 mph) (Touring version); 142 km/h (88 mph) (Sports version)
- Power: 14 bhp (10 kW)
- Transmission: No clutch; 1-speed fixed transmission

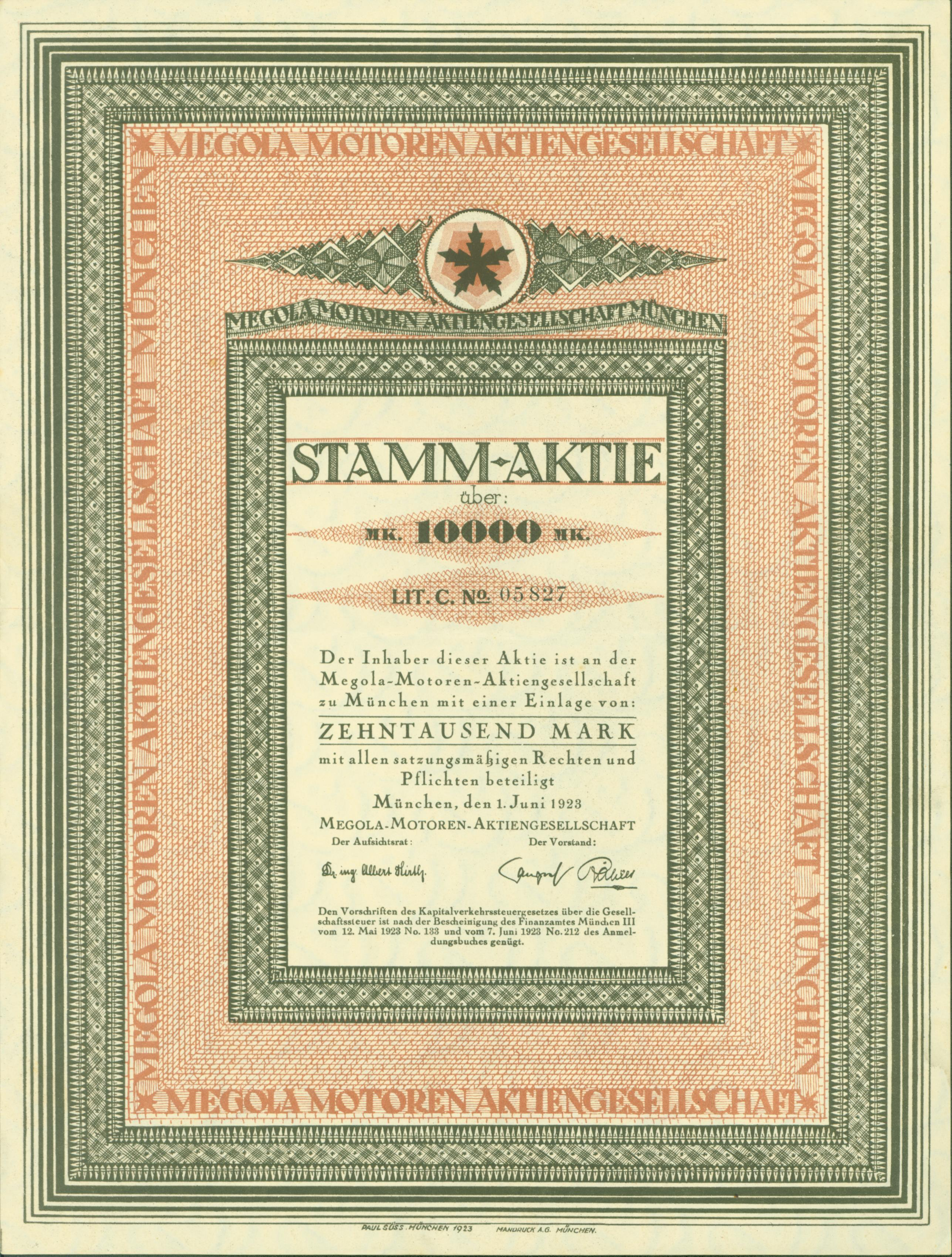
Share of the Megola Motoren AG, issued 1. June 1923

The Megola was a German motorcycle produced between 1921 and 1925 in Munich. Like Bimota, the name is a portmanteau derived from the names of its designers Meixner, Gockerell, and Landgraf.

== Design ==
The Megola had a unique design, laid down in 1920 by Fritz Cockerell, whose real name was Friedrich Gockerell. He used a rotary engine mounted within the front wheel. It has a five-cylinder flathead engine. Each cylinder has a bore and stroke of 52 by 60 millimetres (2.0 in × 2.4 in) and displaces 128 cubic centimetres (7.8 cu in), making the total displacement 640 cc (39 cu in). The cylinders rotate around the front axle at six times the wheel speed; thus while the cylinders are at maximum of 3,600 rpm the front wheel turns at 600 rpm, or roughly 60 miles per hour (97 km/h) (given the wheel diameter). A hand-controlled butterfly valve in the hollow crankshaft regulates the throttle. Power output was 14 brake horsepower (10 kW), applied directly to the wheel. This creates a very low centre of gravity and gives excellent handling.

The first prototype was the "PAX", built in 1918 with a three-cylinder engine within the rear wheel. This was followed in 1920 by a five-cylinder prototype, but still with the engine in the rear wheel. For the production model, the engine was relocated in the front wheel.

Unusual features on the production models included two fuel tanks. The main tank is hidden inside the extensive bodywork, and the fuel from it is hand-pumped to a smaller tank above the engine. The rear wheel has two independent brakes. Megolas came well-equipped, with a fuel gauge, tachometer and ammeter as standard equipment. Two models were offered: sporting and touring. The touring model has a sprung rear wheel and soft saddle. The sport lacks rear suspension but has a more powerful engine. The top speed is 85 kilometres per hour (53 mph). Motorcycle racer Toni Bauhofer achieved 142 kilometres per hour (88 mph) on a sports-model on the AVUS racing circuit in Berlin. In 1924 he won the over-500cc-class on a Megola at the German Motorcycle Road Championship.

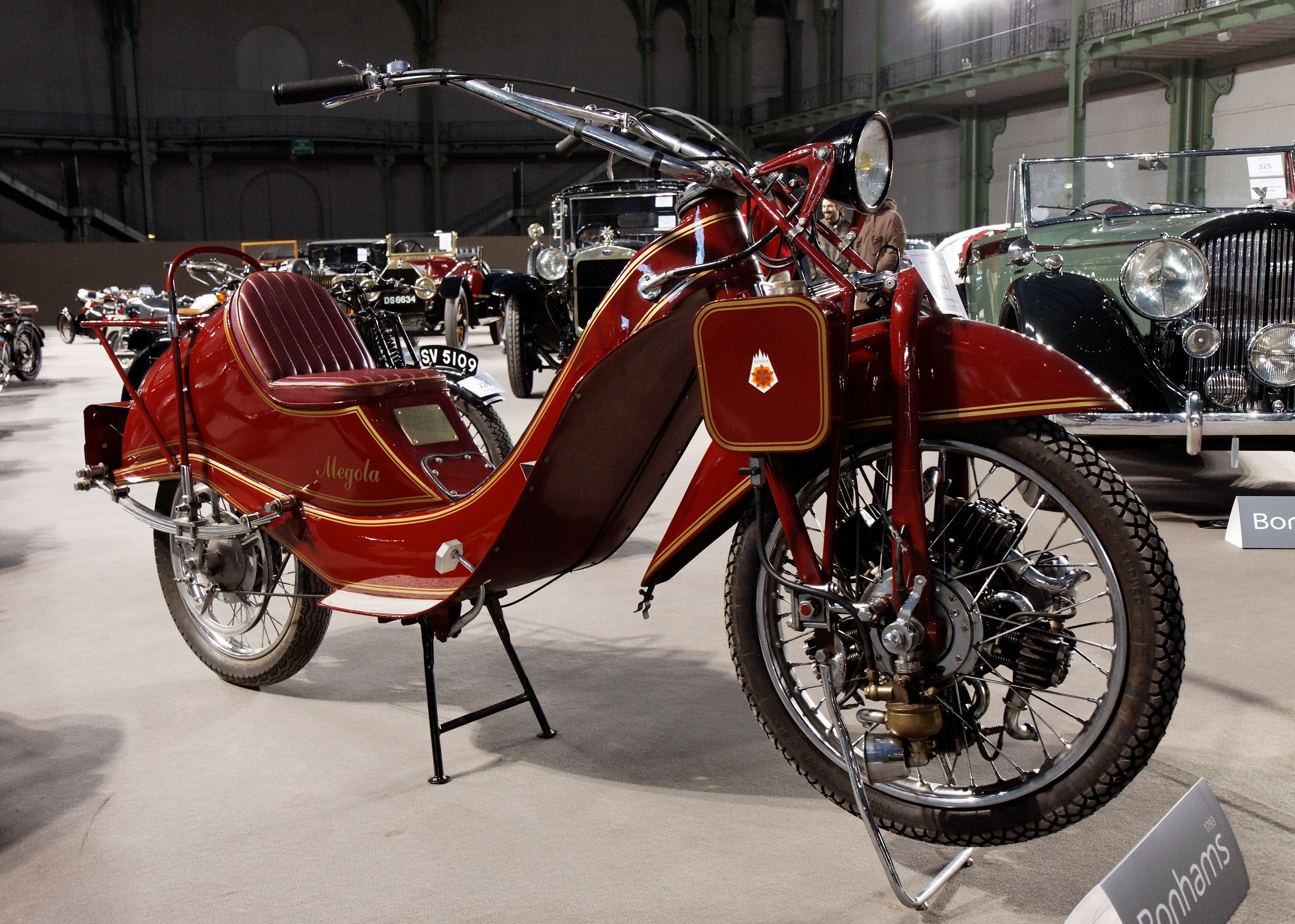
A Megola touring bike displayed at a 2011 exhibition in Paris - 110 ans d'automobile au Grand Palais

The engine was very flexible, lacking both a clutch and a transmission. To start the engine, the rider had to either spin the front wheel while the cycle was on its stand, or push-start the cycle. The cylinders could be disassembled without having to remove all the wheel spokes to reach them. The lack of a clutch meant the engine had to be stopped when the cycle was stationary. As an alternative, the owner's manual suggested the rider make small orbits in the road if at any point they had to halt.

The tires were tubed with the front inner-tube being a circular sausage-shape rather than a complete doughnut-like torus shape, so that it could be changed without removing the wheel and engine. At the time, this type of tube was produced commercially so it was likely not created specially for the Megola. The box-section frame contained the main fuel tank which fed by gravity a smaller tank mounted on the axle. The front suspension consisted of semi-elliptical springs.

== Legacy ==
During less than five years of production, about 2,000 machines were built and sold. About 15 survive. One was displayed at the Guggenheim Museum 'Art of the Motorcycle' exhibition in New York City. An example of a sport version of the Megola is part of the automotive collection of Jay Leno. About eight replica Megolas have been built between the 1980s and the present day. One replica, fitted with an original engine, was sold by Bonhams auction house in London in 2016 for £82,140.

=== Killinger and Freund ===
In 1935 a group of engineers tried to make an improved version, the Killinger and Freund Motorcycle. World War II ended their plans.

== See also ==
- List of motorcycles of the 1920s
- Monowheel
- RevoPower
- Front wheel drive
