= Fritz Cockerell =

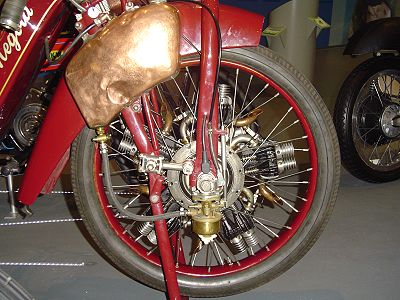
Megola motorcycle showing rotary engine

Fritz Cockerell (1889–1965) was a German pioneer of motorcycle, automotive and engine construction.

== Biography ==
Fritz Cockerell (born 25 November 1889 in Munich, died 16 April 1965) was a German pioneer of motorcycle, automotive and engine construction. His real name was Friedrich Gockerell, but in his published patent documents, he is referred to as Fritz Cockerell.

Fritz Cockerell initially worked as a machinist in an airship factory and later in steam turbine construction at Maffei. He then moved to Rapp Motorenwerke, which later became Bayerische Motorenwerke (BMW), where he worked as a test engineer. Later, with Hans Meixner and Otto Landgraf, he founded the Megola works in Munich for the production of the Megola motorcycle. This was characterized by a five-cylinder rotary engine in the front wheel and around 2,000 units were built. The Megola was added to the temporary exhibition "The art of the motorcycle" by the Guggenheim Museum in 1998.

Cockerell operated the Cockerell Fahrzeugwerke and developed in-house an eight-cylinder two-stroke engine for a "German people-determined sports car" and a four-cylinder two-stroke engine, which was used for installation in a few prototypes of a car and a two-wheeler. Cockerell was more successful with auxiliary bike engines and light motorcycles, which were considered very reliable and sold under his own name. He later devoted himself to research on diesel engines for aircraft, turbine engines and the Wankel engine.
