= Barry Engine =

- Manufacturer: Barry Motor Company
- Production: 1904–1905
- Engine: Two-cylinder supercharged rotary engine

The Barry Engine first appeared in 1904 when it was exhibited at the Stanley Exhibition in London's Berners Hall. Designed by Charles Benjamin Redrup and manufactured in partnership with Alban Williams by the Barry Motor Company, the engine was a two-cylinder supercharged rotary engine. The prototype motorcycle retained the pedals of a conventional cycle, with the engine rotating on the pedal shaft between the rider's knees. The rider was protected by a colander-type perforated cage, which enabled cooling air to reach the cylinders.

The engine was reviewed by a number of contemporary journals.

Later models of the motorcycle dispensed with the pedals and the engine was lowered to improve the centre of gravity. No known models of the engine survive, but a similar Redrup 1912 rotary aircraft engine is preserved in the Science and Industry Museum in Manchester, and later Redrup Radial engines designed and built by Redrup are still in existence.
