= Redrup =

Redrup is a surname. Notable people with the surname include:

- Charles Benjamin Redrup (1878–1961), British aeronautical engineer and inventor
- Ronald Redrup (1935–2013), British boxer

== See also ==
- Redrup v. New York, 1967 lawsuit
