= Jet Reaction (motorcycle) =

- Class: Land speed record streamliner
- Engine: Afterburning turbojet
- Top speed: Over 400 mph (640 km/h)
- Power: 1,250 hp
- Dimensions: L: 6.5 m W: 0.5 m

Jet Reaction is a motorcycle built by British motorcycle land-speed record challenger Richard Brown. The motorcycle is powered by a turboshaft helicopter engine converted to afterburning turbojet.

Brown previously ran the Gillette Mach 3 Challenger hydrogen peroxide rocket motorcycle at Bonneville Salt Flats, setting a one-way speed record of 332.887 mph (535.730 km/h) and top speed of 365 mph (587 km/h). He expects to exceed 400 mph (640 km/h) with Jet Reaction in 2012–2013. If successful, it will be the first jet-propelled motorcycle record breaker.
