= RevoPower =

Motorized wheel concept

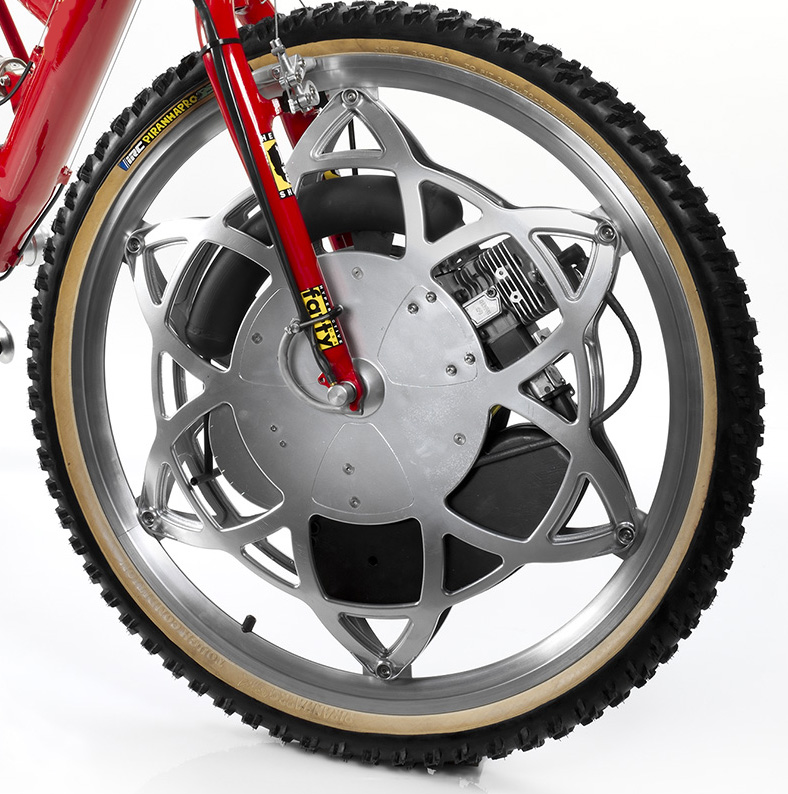
- Manufacturer: RevoPower Inc.
- Engine: 23 cc (1.4 cu in) two-stroke cycle 1.1 hp (0.8 kW) 7500 rpm (maximum)
- Weight: 15 lb (6.8 kg) (dry)
- Fuel capacity: 1 L (0.22 imp gal; 0.26 US gal)

The RevoPower is a motorized wheel concept, the idea being the conversion of a pedal-powered bicycle into a motorcycle. It was invented by Steve Katsaros, based in Denver, Colorado.

The RevoPower concept is a wheel with a two-stroke engine inside it which allows the bike attached to it to travel up to 20 miles per hour (32 km/h) at over 100 miles per US gallon (2.4 L/100 km; 120 mpg_{‑imp}). It is made to replace a standard 26-inch (660 mm) bicycle wheel, and to be able to run off a standard two-stroke mixture of gasoline and oil. According to the inventor, it was designed to be a fuel efficient personal transport option for commuters, college students, and other specialty uses.

== History ==
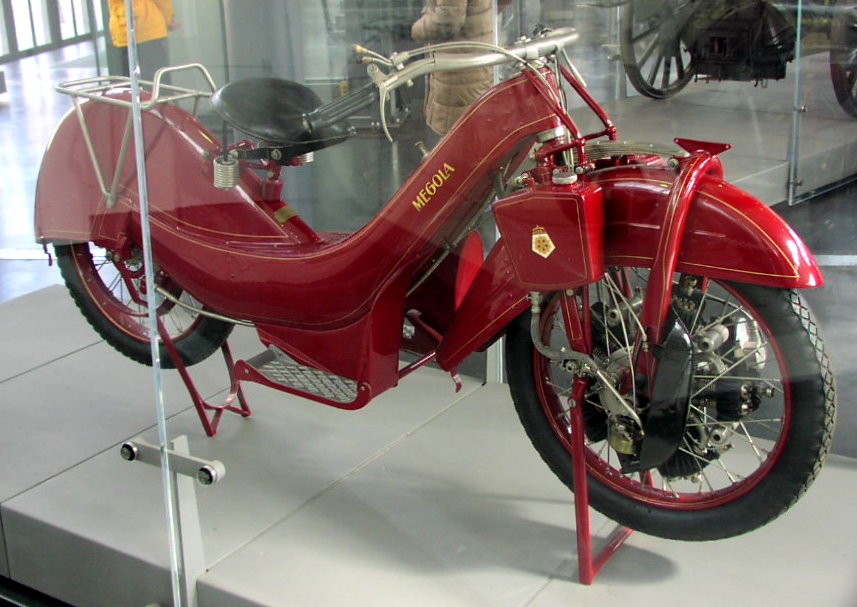
The Megola, a motorized hub example from the 1920s.

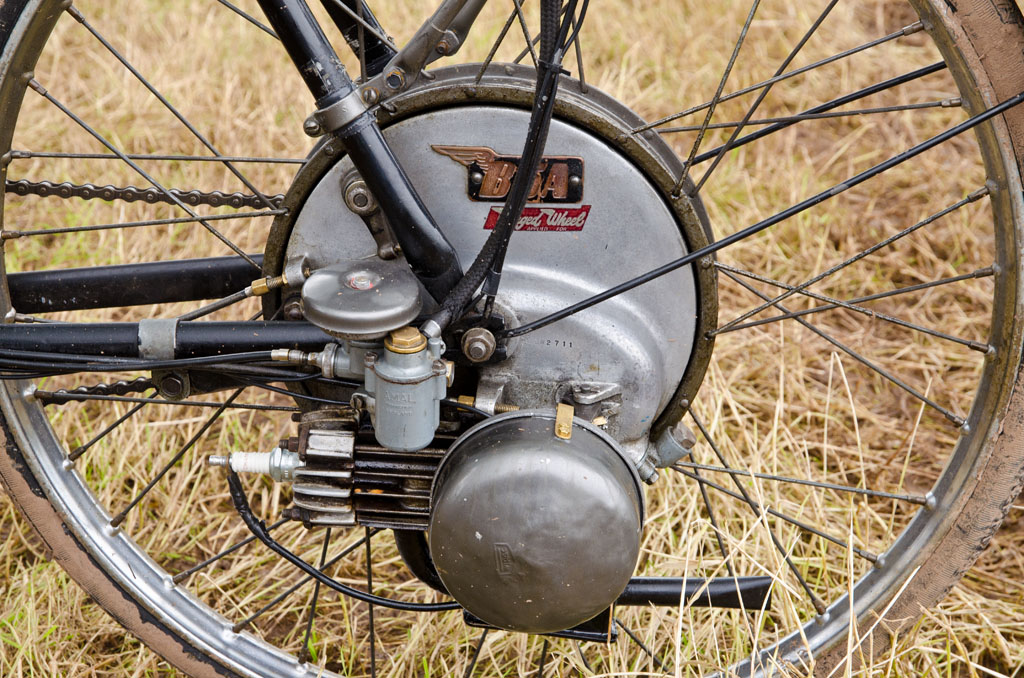
1953 BSA Winged Wheel.

In 1997, Steve Katsaros, the creator of the RevoPower, visited a manufacturer who was experimenting with making electric powered bicycle taxis. He disliked the electrical design and began thinking about how to power a bicycle with a gasoline engine, eventually deciding to keep the engine inside the bicycle wheel so that it could be added or removed easily. In 2002, Katsaros filed a patent on the design, and submitted it in various contests, including one in Design News, in which he won an Excellence in Engineering Award. After news of the award was published on Slashdot, John Richards emailed Katsaros, and they started discussing business together. On May 16, 2003, Katsaros and Richards founded RevoPower, Inc. Its release has been postponed numerous times, having been planned variously for the second quarter of 2004, late 2005, early 2007, and being hopefully expected for early to mid-2008. As of December 2008 it had yet to be released, their official website is offline, and calls made to their Colorado office went unanswered. These circumstances, coupled with Revopower's solicitation of a $50 deposit to guarantee delivery of the first production run led to speculation that the product was never ready for the market. In any case, reimbursement checks were issued to people who had placed deposits.

== Design ==
The wheel's design is covered by numerous patents in over 26 countries. In order to fit the entire engine inside the Wheel, it was designed using SolidWorks to deal with the technical challenges of building an engine in a bicycle's wheel. The engine is a 25 cc (1.5 cu in) two-stroke cycle design, capable of producing 1 horsepower (0.75 kW), and doing up to about 20 miles per hour (32 km/h) on level ground, while getting about 100 miles per US gallon (2.4 L/100 km; 120 mpg_{‑imp}). The wheel conforms to California Air Resources Board and United States Environmental Protection Agency emissions regulations, with the company noting "The Wheel stops when you stop, eliminating idling". Later models are expected to include four-stroke, ethanol, and hybrid engines.

Although the company intends the Wheel to be used by people who are not mechanically inclined, it can be installed by a dealer. The Wheel's announced initial release will fit only 26-inch (660 mm) wheel bicycles, although later models may be made in other sizes. The design of the Wheel allows the bike to which it is attached to be powered by traditional pedaling, the motor alone, or a combination of the two. As a safety feature, it shuts itself off if the rider falls off.

== Delays and speculation ==
Although production had been promised by the company originally for 2006, the date was pushed back to early 2008 in an interview with Popular Science. Some speculated there were technical problems with the design, and internet discussion boards show a lot of disbelief in the product due to the extended delays. As of 2009, the company's website is no longer active and the main phone line for RevoPower in Denver is not active.

== See also ==
- Motorized bicycle
- Motorcycle fork
- Monowheel
- Front wheel drive
- Winged wheel
