= Motorcycle engine =

Engine that powers a motorcycle

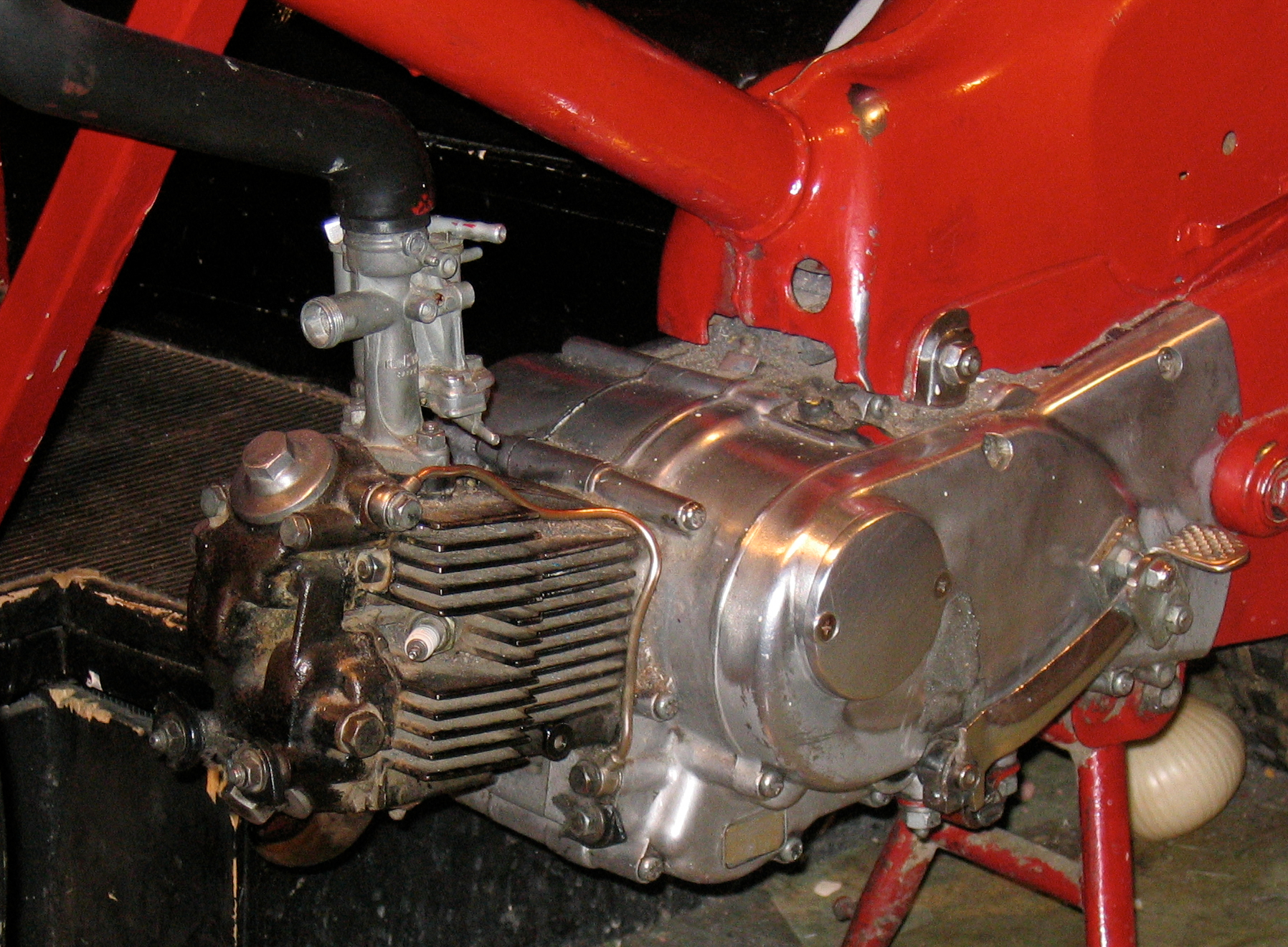
A Honda Super Cub engine. The most popular motorcycle in history, with over 100 million produced.

A motorcycle engine is an engine that powers a motorcycle. Motorcycle engines are typically two-stroke or four-stroke internal combustion engines, but other engine types, such as Wankels and electric motors, have been used.

Although some mopeds, such as the VéloSoleX, had friction drive to the front tire, a motorcycle engine normally drives the rear wheel, power being sent to the driven wheel by belt, chain or shaft. Historically, some 2,000 units of the Megola were produced between 1921 and 1925 with front wheel drive, and the modern Rokon, an all terrain motorcycle with both wheels driven, has been produced since 1960.

Most engines have a gearbox with up to six or even 7 ratios. Reverse gear is occasionally found on heavy tourers, for example the Honda GL1600, and sidecar motorcycles, such as the Ural. The rider changes gears on most motorcycles using a foot-pedal and manual clutch, but early models had hand-levers. More recently, some have automatic or semi-automatic gearboxes, and some using CVT transmission.

Outside the United States, engine capacities typically ranged from about 50 cc to 650 cc; but in Europe since 1968 motorcycles with larger capacities have become common, ranging as high as the Triumph Rocket 3's 2,500 cubic centimetres (150 cu in) engine. In the United States, V-twin engined motorcycles with capacities of 850 cc or more have been the norm since the 1920s.

== History ==
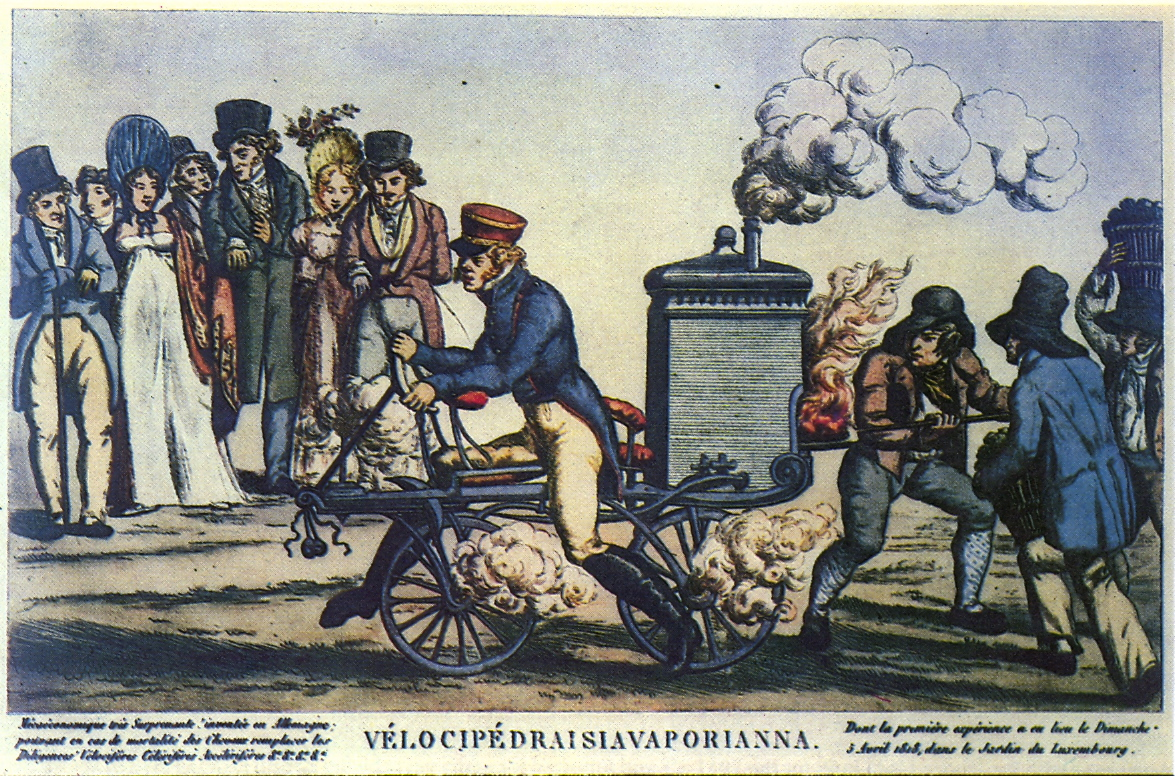
Earliest motorcycle engine concept. This 1818 caricature was thought for many years to be entirely fanciful, until the Michaux-Perreaux, Roper and other steam cycles were rescued from obscurity, and the stories of the early steam cycle experiments were rediscovered. There were no steam motorcycles in 1818, but there soon would be.

The first motorcycles were powered by steam engines. The earliest example is the French Michaux-Perreaux steam velocipede of 1868. This was followed by the American Roper steam velocipede of 1869, and a number of other steam powered two and three wheelers, manufactured and sold to the public on through the early 20th century.

Using frames based both on the earlier boneshaker and the later—and in many ways completely modern—safety bicycle design, these early steam motorcycles experimented with a variety of engine placement strategies, as well as transmission and options. While today nearly every motorcycle has its engine in the center of the frame; this became standard only around 1900-1910 after nearly every possible engine location was tried. The origins of the scooter engine arrangement (including the shaft drive) can be traced back to the 19th century but the current layout became generally adopted after the Great War. The modern equivalent became universally popular in the 1950s and remains much the same today.

The Otto cycle gasoline internal combustion engine was first used on an experimental two-wheeler created by Gottlieb Daimler to test the practicality of such an engine in a vehicle. This motorcycle, the Daimler Reitwagen, is credited as the world's first motorcycle by many authorities, partially on the assumption that a motorcycle is defined not as any two-wheel motor vehicle, but a two-wheel internal combustion engine motor vehicle. The Oxford English Dictionary, for example, defines the word motorcycle this way. The steam cycles were also simply neglected and forgotten by many historians, even as the Michaux-Perreaux waited forty years on display in the National Motor Museum, Beaulieu.

In recent years, a surge in interest in clean energy has put many new electric powered two wheelers on the market, and they are registered as motorcycles or scooters, without the type of powerplant being an issue. Diesel motorcycles were also experimented with briefly in the 20th century, and are again the subject of interest due to fuel economy and the needs of military logistics. The USMC has ordered a new diesel motorcycle, the M1030 M1, that can use the same fuel, JP-8, as the rest of their armored vehicles, aircraft, cars and trucks.

The overwhelming majority of the motorcycles produced and used in the world today have small displacement air-cooled single-cylinder engines, both two- and four-strokes. In the wealthier parts of the world, Europe and Japan, larger displacements and multiple cylinders are common alongside small-displacement bikes required by various licensing and rider experience requirements, and so a very diverse range of sizes, cylinder numbers, configurations, and cooling systems are seen on the road. Many developed countries have graduated licensing, where a rider is licensed for a period of time to ride only smaller-displacement motorcycles before being allowed to ride larger ones. The United States does not have graduated licensing, and so the mix is skewed even further to the largest displacements, because consumer demand drives manufacturers to offer their largest motorcycles to that country, and to export far fewer sub-600 cc (37 cu in) models to the American market.

== Types ==
Almost all production motorcycles have gasoline internal combustion engines. Both four-stroke and two-stroke engines are used, but strict emission laws have led to far fewer two-strokes. A few have used Wankel rotary engines, but no Wankel bikes are currently in production. Motorcycle engines can be air cooled or liquid cooled, and optionally include oil cooling as well. Some scooters use batteries and an electric motor. The 2009 TT races introduced a new category 'TTX' (renamed as TT Zero) for electric bikes using fuel-cells or batteries.

Motorcycle engines can be mounted transversely; with the crankshaft aligned perpendicular to the frame or longitudinally, with the crankshaft parallel to the frame. Motorcycles with transversely mounted engines are more suited to have chain or belt final-drive. Motorcycles with longitudinally mounted engines are more suited for shaft final-drive.

Motor scooters often have the engine as part of the rear suspension, so the engine is not fixed rigidly to the main frame. Instead, the combined engine-transmission-swingarm assembly is pivoted to follow the road surface and is part of the "unsprung weight". The chain final-drive of scooters runs in an oil-bath within the engine casings. "Step-through" motorcycles may have a rigidly fixed engine, or may have a scooter-type arrangement.

== Two-stroke and four-stroke ==
Two-stroke engines have fewer moving parts than four-stroke engines, and produce twice the number of power strokes per revolution.

Fuel economy is better in four-strokes due to more complete combustion of the intake charge in four-stroke engines.

Nevertheless, two-strokes have been largely replaced on motorcycles in developed nations due to their environmental disadvantages. Cylinder lubrication is necessarily total-loss and this inevitably leads to a smokey exhaust, particularly on wide throttle openings. Two-stroke-engined motorcycles continue to be made in large numbers, but mostly off-road motocross low-power mopeds, small scooters and step-through underbones where they still compete strongly with four-strokes (including the highest-selling motorcycle of all time, the 50 cc Honda Super Cub). The major markets of two-stroke motorcycles are in dirt bikes and developing nations.

== Cylinder heads (four-stroke) ==
Cylinder head design has a significant effect on the efficiency of combustion, and hence the power output of the engine. The head may be flat, in which case the combustion chamber resides within the cylinder and/or a depression in the piston crown, but usually a "dome" within the cylinder head provides most of the combustion volume. Motorcycles use poppet valves in a range of designs: side valve, overhead valve (OHV) with pushrod operation, overhead cam (SOHC), and double overhead cam (DOHC). A cylinder with desmodromic valves may have three or even four camshafts. An OHC or DOHC cylinder head will have at least two valves per cylinder (1 inlet and 1 exhaust), but multi-valve engines may have three (2 inlet and 1 exhaust), or four (2 inlet and 2 exhaust), or even five (3 inlet and 2 exhaust). Cylinder heads are the hottest part of the engine and require adequate cooling, typically air cooling, oil cooling or liquid cooling.

Some motorcycles such as Harley-Davidsons, Moto Guzzis and BMWs become identifiable by their cylinder-head types, namely airhead, panhead, oilhead, and even knucklehead. The Ducati desmos head enables higher rpm to be achieved without detrimental valve float also known as valve bounce.

== Valve control in four-strokes ==
In a side-valve engine, the valves are operated from the "underhead" cam without special valve gear. Overhead valve (OHV) engines have valves operated by pushrods. Single- and double-overhead camshaft (SOHC and DOHC, respectively) engines have overhead camshafts typically operated by chain, belt, gear train or bevel gear drive.

The earliest motorcycle engines had exhaust valves operated in the same way as a side-valve engine, but they had overhead intake valves held closed by a weak spring. The intake valve was opened by the suction caused by the intake stroke. As the need for mechanical control of the intake valve arose, the design was modified by adding another cam to the camshaft and using a pushrod and rocker arm to operate the intake valve.

Honda equipped the CBR400F with REV, described as "revolution responding type valve pausing mechanism", in 1983. This system enabled switching over the number of valve operations per cylinder between low and medium speed revolution range and high speed revolution range. In 2002, Honda introduced HYPER VTEC in the VFR800 Interceptor. In 2006, Kawasaki introduced VVT in the Concours 14.

== Unit construction ==
Engines and gearboxes were originally separate items, the gearbox being driven by a "primary chain". Later designs combined the two elements into a single "unit construction". Some manufacturers, such as Norton and Enfield continued with "pre-unit" construction until recently, and Harley-Davidson still makes pre-unit engines today.

In the early 1960s, BSA introduced new short-stroke unit construction 500 and 650 cc parallel twins to replace their existing pre-unit long-stroke engines. Triumph modified their large pre-unit 500 and 650 cc parallel twins into unit-construction engines. The smaller Triumph 350 and 500 cc twins had been unit construction from their introduction in 1957. The decision by Lucas to discontinue making dynamos and magnetos, and to produce only alternators and coil ignition systems, was a significant factor in forcing the redesign.

Traditionally, engines and gearboxes had separate lubrication systems with different grades of oil; but modern practice is to use the same oil for both.

== Cylinders and configuration ==
Generally, motorcycle engines have between one and six cylinders. The majority of motorcycle engines are configured as singles, parallel twins, triples, fours and sixes; and all these may be inline or transverse. Vee engines include V-twins and V-fours, and horizontally opposed engines include flat-twins, flat-fours and flat-sixes. Wankel engines are either single-rotor or twin-rotor. Bigger bikes tend to have more cylinders for smoothness and increased power. Modern singles range in capacity from 50 cc to 700 cc, twins from 175 cc to 1,800 cc, triples from 380 cc to 2,300 cc, and so on.

=== Single ===
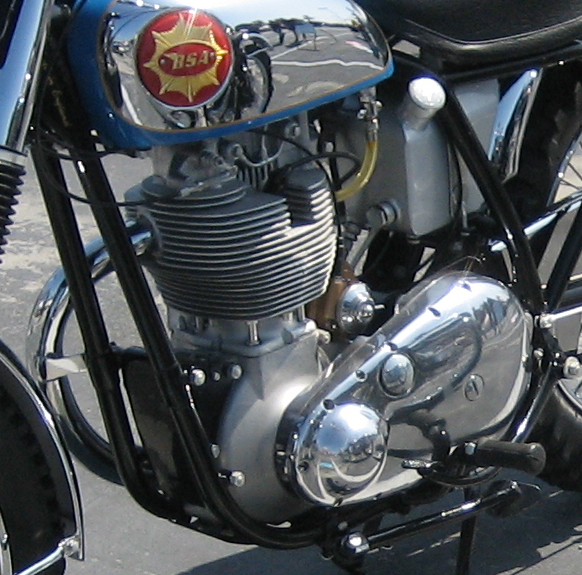
1960 BSA Gold Star

Single-cylinder engines (a.k.a. "singles" or "thumpers") have the cylinder vertical, inclined or horizontal, the last type most common in step-through motorcycles. Single-cylinder engines require both a larger flywheel and a heavier-duty gearbox than multicylinder engines. Small singles are cheap to build and maintain and are suitable as cheap utility motorcycles.

Until the mid-1960s, road-racing machines, like the UK's Matchless, AJS and Norton, tended to be large singles, but since then multicylinder racers have become the norm. Off-road and smaller dual-sport bikes tend to use single-cylinder engines. The simplicity of these engines, often relying on a single carburetor, make them relatively easy to maintain and repair in remote locations with few tools.

Compared to lightweight off-road singles, the modern category of heavier off-road adventure bikes tend to forgo such simplicity, and instead have larger and more powerful parallel-twin, flat-twin, or V-twin engines.

=== Twin ===
Straight-twin

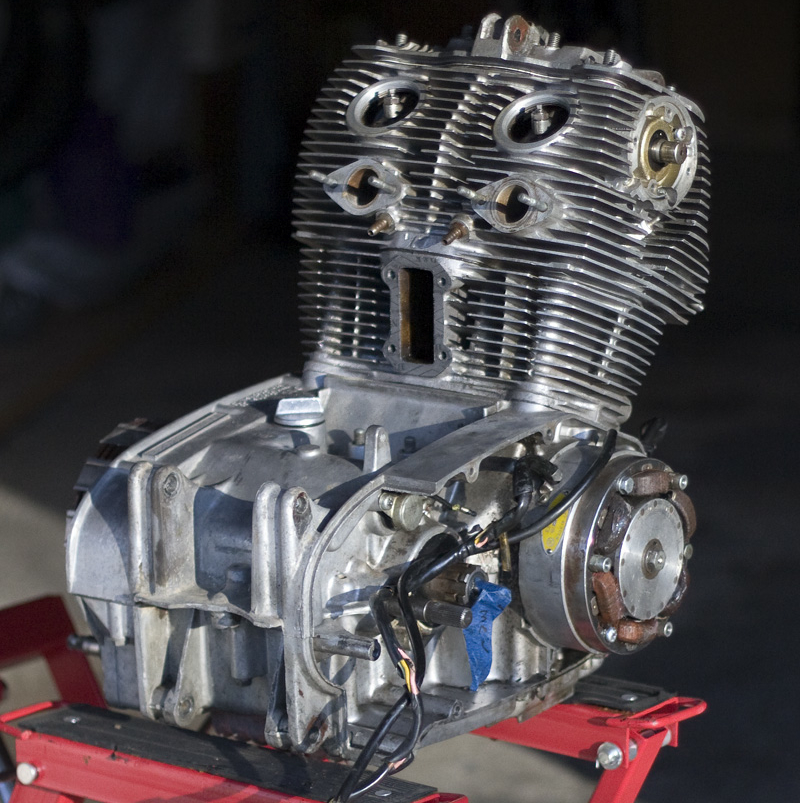
1962 Honda CB77 Superhawk 305 cc (18.6 cu in) twin engine

Starting with Edward Turner's 1937 Triumph Speed Twin design, and until the mid-1970s, the parallel-twin was the most common British motorcycle type. Parallel-twins are usually mounted transversely, with the cylinders side by side above the crankshaft, and with exhaust pipes at the front, in the cool airstream. Longitudinal, or inline, twins include the 500 cc Sunbeam S7 and S8. There are three crankshaft configurations for this engine: 360°, 180°, and the newer 270°. Parallel twins usually have only two main bearings.

V-twin

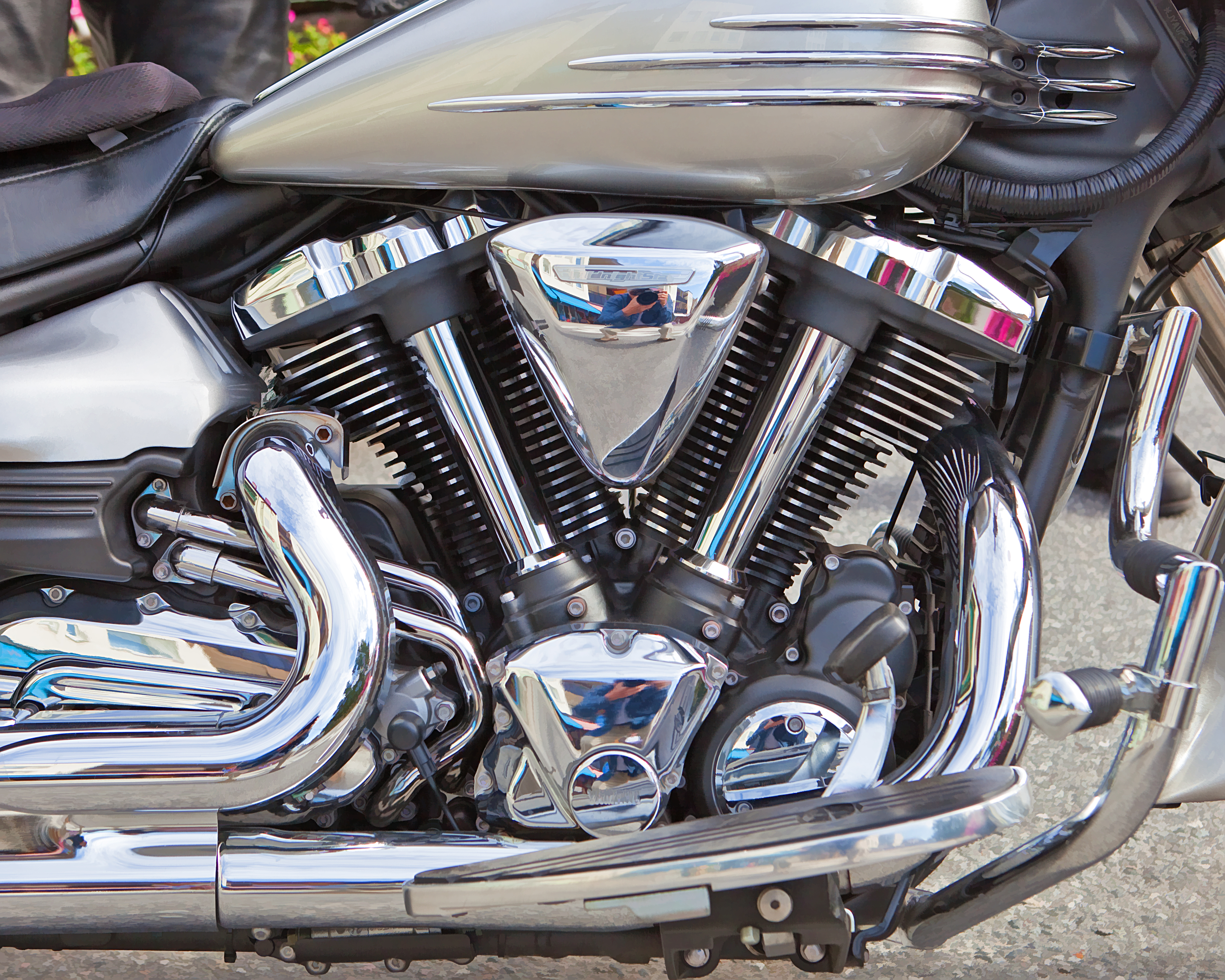
Yamaha XV1900A V-twin

In a V-twin engine the cylinders form a "V" around the crankshaft. A Vee-angle of 90°, as used by Ducati and Moto Guzzi, can give perfect primary and secondary balance, with a pleasingly irregular firing order. A lesser angle gives a more compact motor, but one which is prone to vibration, such as 42° (Indian), 45° (Harley-Davidson), 52° Honda, and 60° (Aprilia). Most V-twins have a single crankpin shared by side-by-side connecting rods so that the cylinders are slightly offset, but a variation is to have a single crankpin with "fork & blade" con-rods, to keep the cylinders in line. Non-90° V-twins may have offset crankpins to try to reduce vibration.

V-twins may be mounted either longitudinally with the cylinders protruding either side, like the Honda CX500 and Moto Guzzi, or transversely, such as Harley-Davidson, Ducati, or Aprilia. Transverse V-twins can raise difficulties in cooling the aft cylinder, and in siting the airbox, battery, aft carburetor, and aft exhaust pipe.

Flat-twin

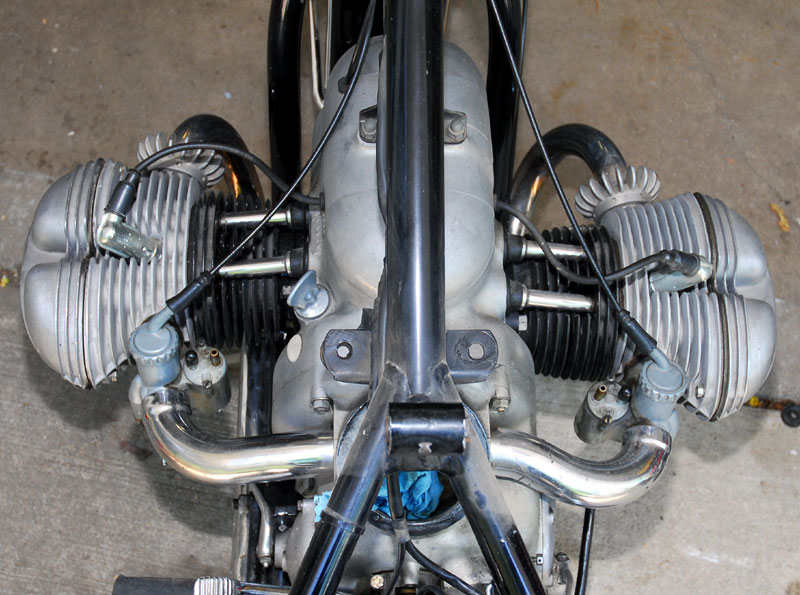
BMW's opposed twin on a 1954 R68

In a flat-twin, or boxer, engine the cylinders are horizontally opposed. The boxer has perfect primary balance, and only a small rocking couple, and unlike a V-twin, regular firing intervals, producing very low vibration levels, without the use of counterbalance shafts. They are usually mounted with a longitudinal crankshaft, with the cylinders protruding into the airstream, so that a flat-twin can satisfactorily be air-cooled. Flat-twins are made by BMW and Ural and historically by Douglas, Marusho, and Hoffmann, among others. The longitudinal mounting makes the flat twin highly suitable for shaft final drive.

Some early motorcycles used transverse-crank flat twin engines, especially Douglas motorcycles before World War II.

Tandem twin

The Tandem Twin where the cylinders are longitudinal, and have two cranks geared together such as Kawasaki's KR250 road bike and KR250 and KR350 GP Bikes. A tandem twin is effectively a pair of geared singles, and is to be distinguished from an inline twin such as the Sunbeam S7. Tandem twins are suitable primarily for two-stroke racers.

=== Triple ===
Inline triple

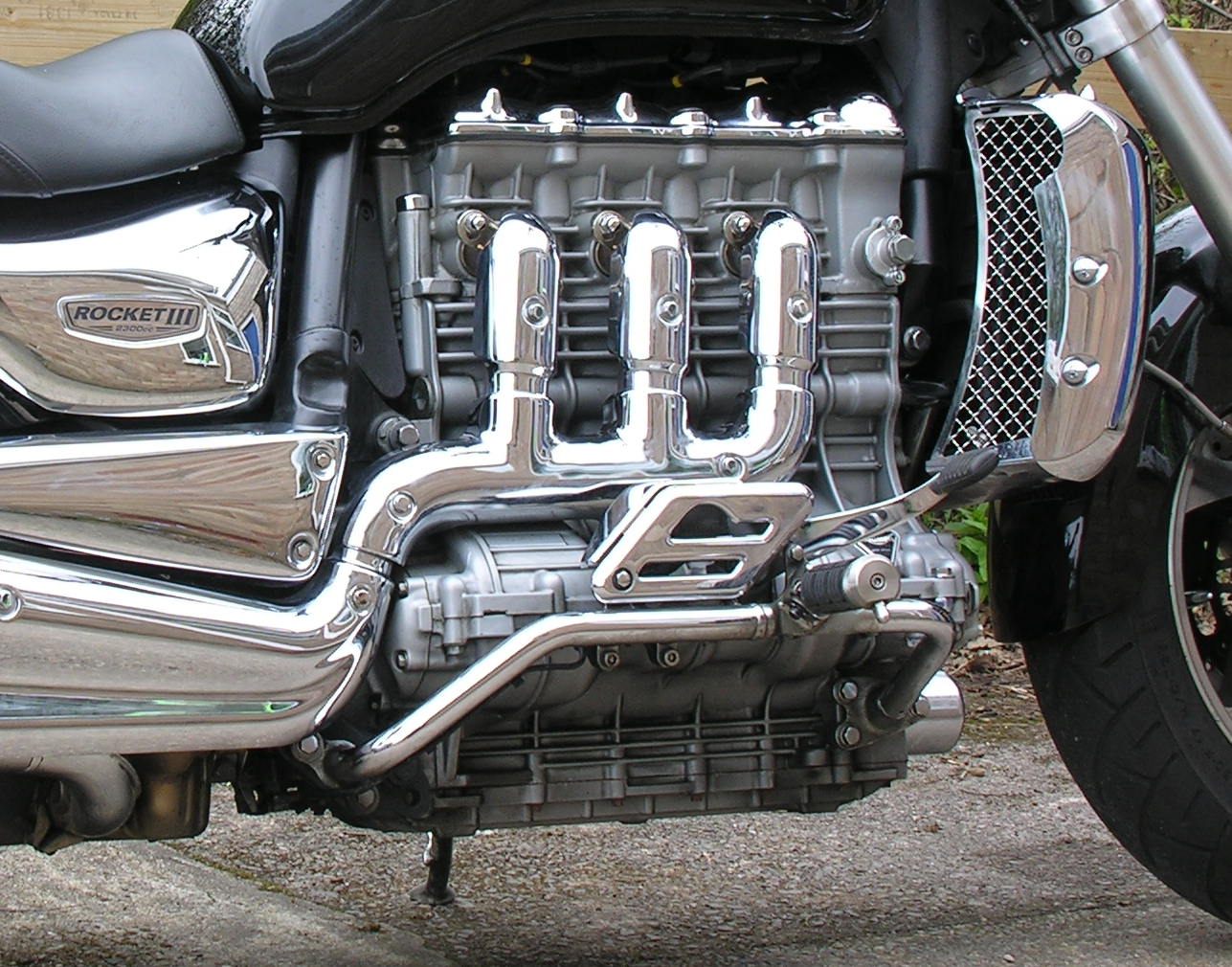
Triumph Rocket III inline-3

Three-cylinder engines, a.k.a. triples, are normally mounted transversely. The British Hinckley Triumph factory has specialized in transverse triples, although their 2,300 cc Rocket III has its engine mounted longitudinally. Other examples are the Benelli' "Tre"and the Yamaha XS750. The Italian firm Laverda made a few 1,000 cc and 1,200 cc triples. Some Laverda Triples had 120° cranks, while some had 180° cranks, essentially three-quarters of a four. BMW made the K75 longitudinally mounted 750 cc triple with the cylinders parallel to the ground. Meriden Triumph developed the 750 cc Trident, from which BSA "badge-engineered" the Rocket-3.

Some triples were two-strokes. The Kawasaki triples were produced with capacities of 250, 350, 400, 500, and 750 cc in the 1970s, while Suzuki produced 380, 550, and 750 triples, the last being water-cooled. Motobecane made 350 cc and fuel-injected 500 cc triples with 3 into 4 pipes in the early seventies. Honda produced the water-cooled V-3 two-strokes MVX250 and NS400. There have been various race bike triples such as Kawasaki KR750, Suzuki TR750 transverse 3s, and Proton/Modenas KR3, Honda NS500 V-3s.

=== Four ===
Four-cylinder engines are most commonly found in a transverse-mounted inline four layout, although some are longitudinal, as in the earlier BMW K100. V-4 and boxer designs, as in the earlier Honda Gold Wing, have been produced. One of the more unusual designs was the Ariel Square Four, effectively two parallel-twin engines one in front of the other in a common crankcase — it had remarkably little vibration due to the contra-rotating crankshafts.

Inline four

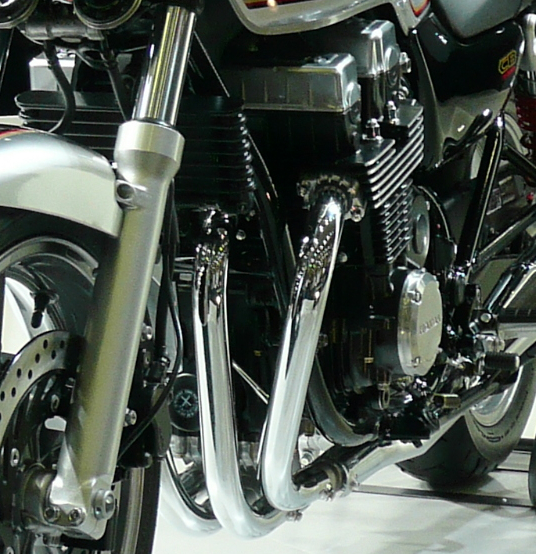
Honda CB750 transverse inline-4

Production of four cylinder motorcycles began with the FN Four in 1905. The FN had its engine in line with the frame; this layout would be copied by manufacturers in Europe and the United States before World War II. In the United States, inline fours made by Henderson and Indian were bought by enthusiasts and by police departments, the latter using them as pursuit motorcycles.

The first across-the-frame 4-cylinder motorcycle was the racer 1939 Gilera 500 Rondine, it also had double-over-head camshafts, forced-inducting supercharger and also water-cooled. Since the advent of the Honda CB750 straight-four engine, straight-fours have dominated the non-cruiser street motorcycle segments. The German manufacturer Münch based their motorcycles on four-cylinder car engines. For example, the Mammut 2000 has a 2.0l with a turbo and cylinder heads by Cosworth.

Flat four

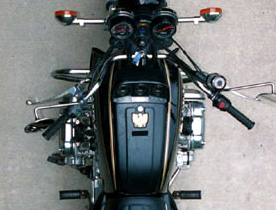
The Honda GL1000 flat-four

A flat-4 or horizontally opposed-4 is a flat engine with four cylinders arranged horizontally in two banks of two cylinders on each side of a central crankcase. The pistons are usually mounted on the crankshaft such that opposing pistons move back and forth in opposite directions at the same time, somewhat like a boxing competitor punching their gloves together before a fight, which has led to it being referred to as a boxer engine. The configuration results in inherently good balance of the reciprocating parts, a low centre of gravity, and a very short engine length.

V4

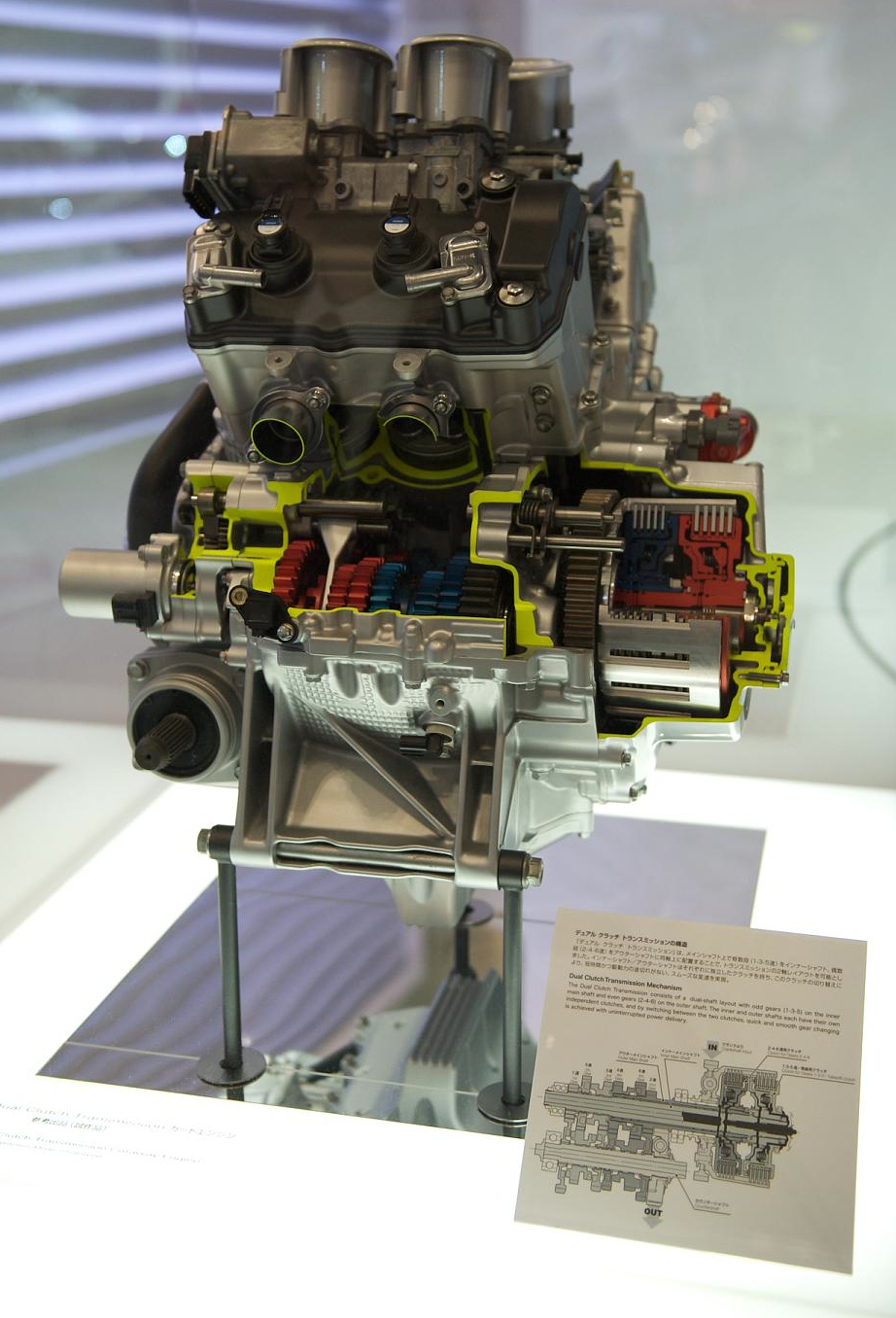
Honda VFR1200F engine with dual clutch transmission

Honda uses V4 engines in the ST series and VFR series. As for two-stroke engines, there were four cylinders in the smaller classes such as Kawasaki's 125 cc KR3 square 4 and Yamaha's 250 cc RD500 V4 (RZ 500 in the US). Yamaha later raced transverse four TZ500/700/750's and virtually all the bikes in the last decade of the two-stroke GP500 era were fours, first squares then Vs, by Honda, Kawasaki, Cagiva, Suzuki, Yamaha. Kawasaki also experimented with a trapezoidal four the 602S. Yamaha made the V4 RD500LC, and Suzuki the RG400 and RG500 square four road bikes.

Square four

A square four is a U engine with two cylinders on each side. This configuration was used on the Ariel Square Four motorcycle from 1931 to 1959. This design was revived as a two-stroke version on some racing Suzuki models, and their subsequent road-going version the RG500. Although some racing success was achieved, the road bikes didn't sell in great numbers, and the design was phased out in favor of in-line, four-stroke designs, as at the time two-stroke engines were quickly being superseded by more economical, reliable, and emissions-friendly four-strokes.

=== Five ===
V5

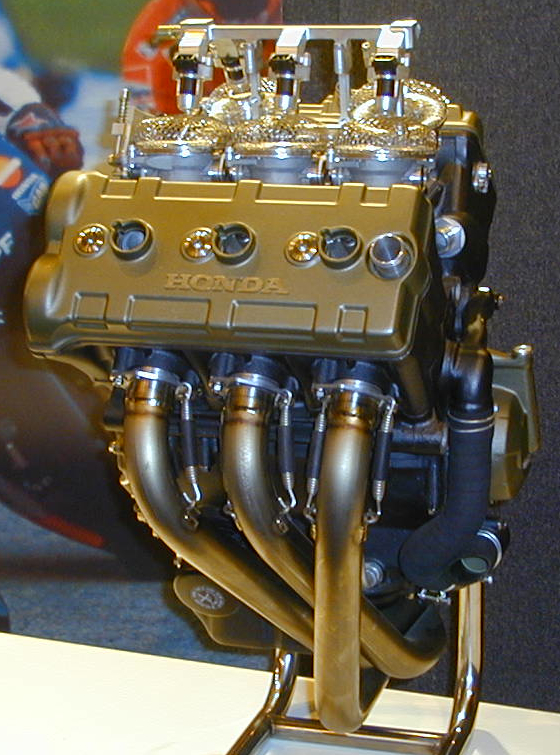
Honda V5 MotoGP engine

Honda has produced five-cylinder engines for racing, the RC211V 990 cc V5. No V5 engines are currently available in commercial production motorcycles.

Just prior to their collapse, BSA planned a modular family of bike engines based around a 200 cc single. The range was to include the single, a 400 cc twin, a 600 cc triple and a 1000 cc V5. None of these motorcycles reached production.

=== Six ===
Inline six

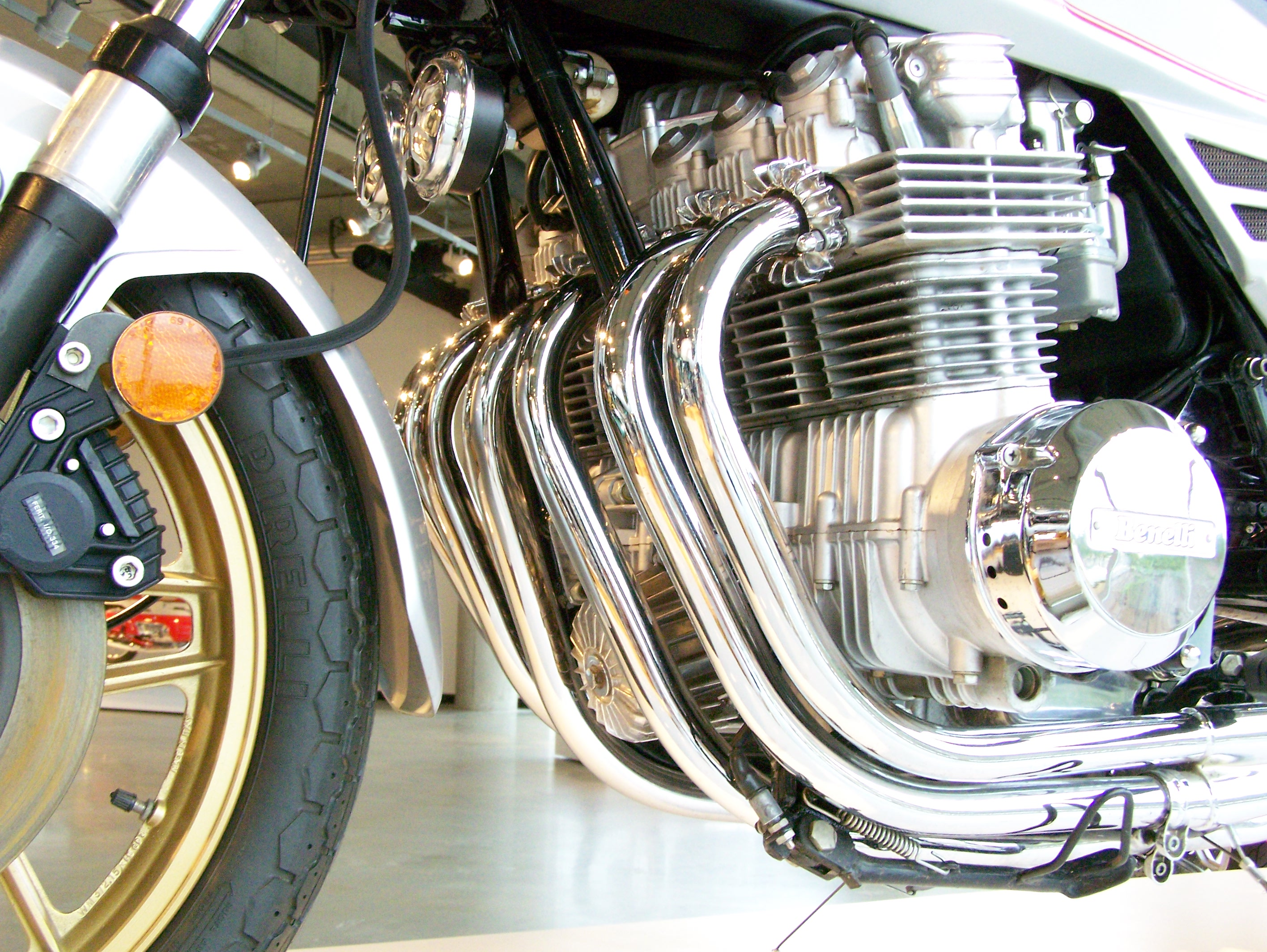
Benelli Sei inline-6

The 1,047 cc Honda CBX was produced from 1978 to 1982. The 1,300 cc Kawasaki KZ1300 was produced from 1979 to 1989. Benelli made the 750 cc and 900 cc the Sei from 1972 to 1978. Honda made a 250 cc straight-six GP bike. The BMW K1600GT and K1600GTL, which were launched in 2011, have a transverse-mounted 1,649 cc engine.

Flat 6

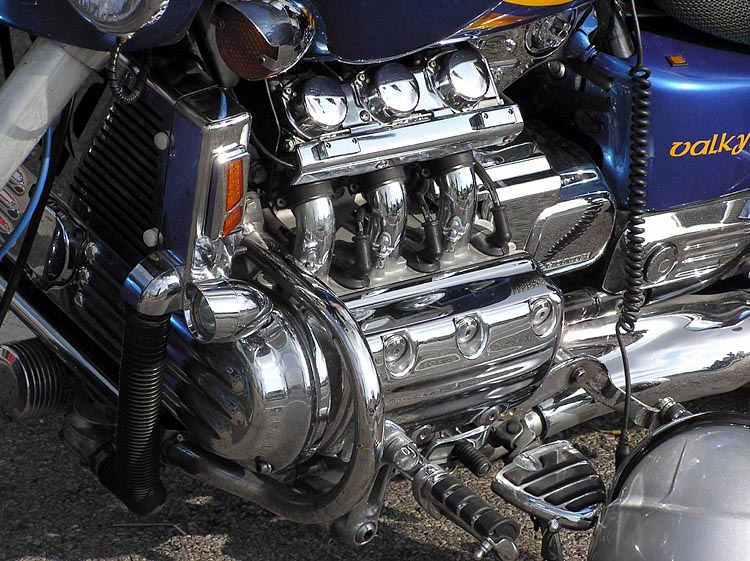
Honda Valkyrie flat-6

The six-cylinder engine is currently used by Honda in the Gold Wing, and had previously been used in the Valkyrie and the Rune, both of which were cruiser developments of the Gold Wing.

=== V8 ===
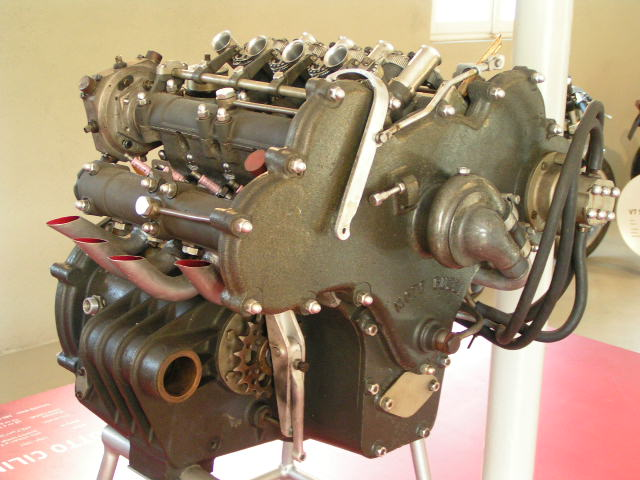
Moto Guzzi V8

Galbusera built a V8 in 1938, and Moto Guzzi experimented over a period of two years with its dual-overhead-cam 500 cc V8, the Otto Cilindri, in the 1950s. Some custom and one-off motorcycles use more than six cylinders. For example, the Boss Hoss motorcycle uses (5,700 cc, 6,000 cc and 8,200 cc) Chevrolet V-8 crate motors. In 2003 Daimler-Chrysler manufactured a limited number of Tomahawk concept vehicles with a Dodge Viper V-10 engine. Australian company Drysdale have built short runs of 750 cc V8 superbikes and 1L V8 roadgoing motorcycles, both with engines specifically developed for the purpose. No major motorcycle manufacturer has used eight or more cylinders, although Honda made the 'almost' V8 oval-piston NR750 road bike and NR500 GP bike, having eight connecting rods. Morbidelli has shown two V8 prototype road bikes that were not produced.

=== Other types ===
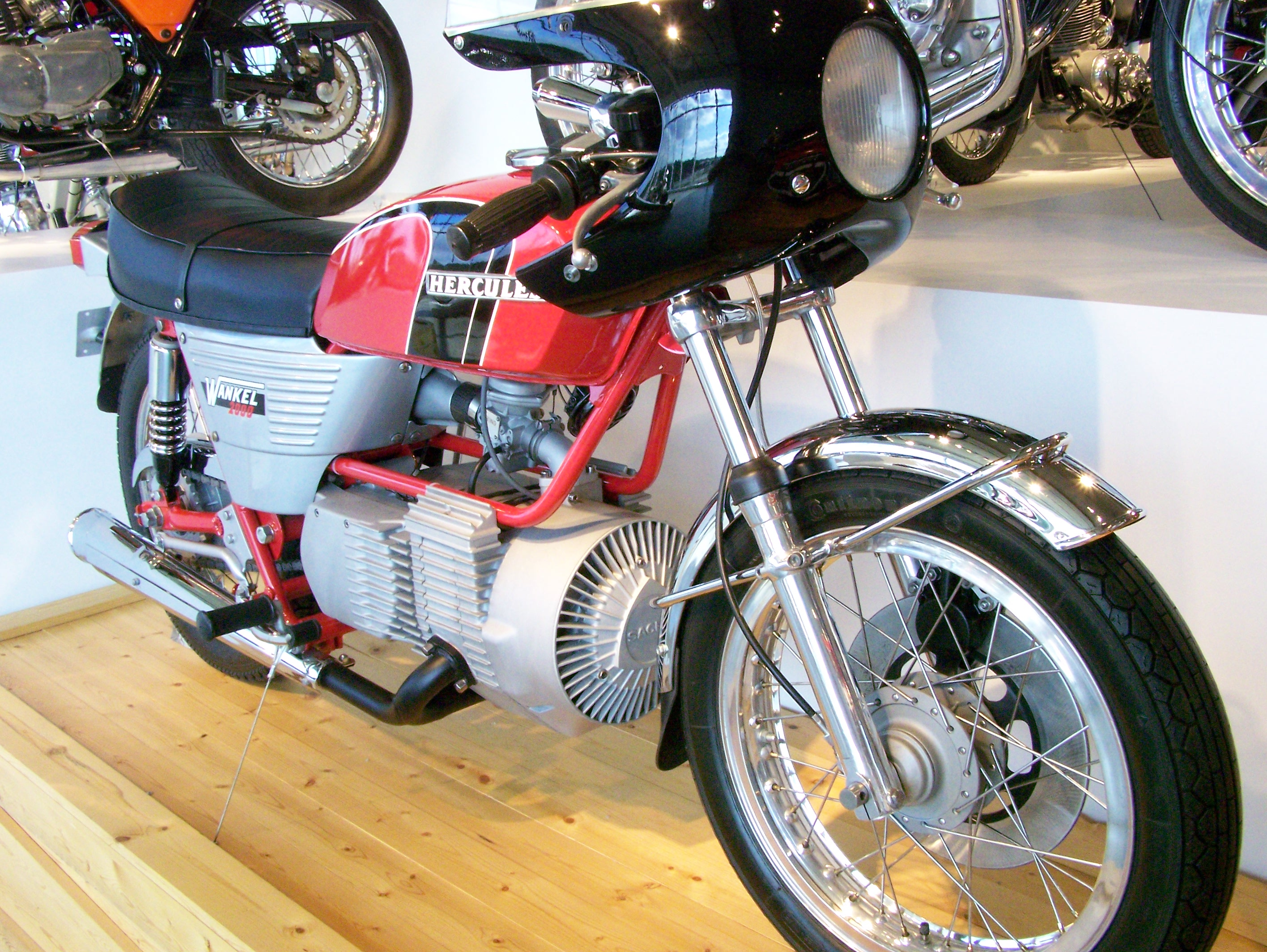
Hercules Wankel 2000

Wankel rotary

Wankel engines produce high power outputs for their size and weight, and several attempts were made to produce Wankel powered motorcycles in the 1970s. Yamaha and Kawasaki exhibited Wankel-powered motorcycles in 1972, but neither company manufactured one. German manufacturer Hercules, a member of the Sachs-controlled Zweirad Union, produced their single-rotor W2000 from 1974 to 1977. Suzuki produced their single-rotor RE5 from 1975 to 1976. Van Veen built 38 OCR1000 motorcycles with twin-rotor Comotor engines between 1978 and 1981.

BSA experimented with Wankel engines before they ended production in the 1970s. These experiments later led to Wankel-engined Norton motorcycles in the 1980s and 1990s, including the Classic, the Commander, the fleet-only Interpol 2, and the F1. Steve Hislop won the 1992 Senior TT on a Wankel-powered Norton.

Oval pistons

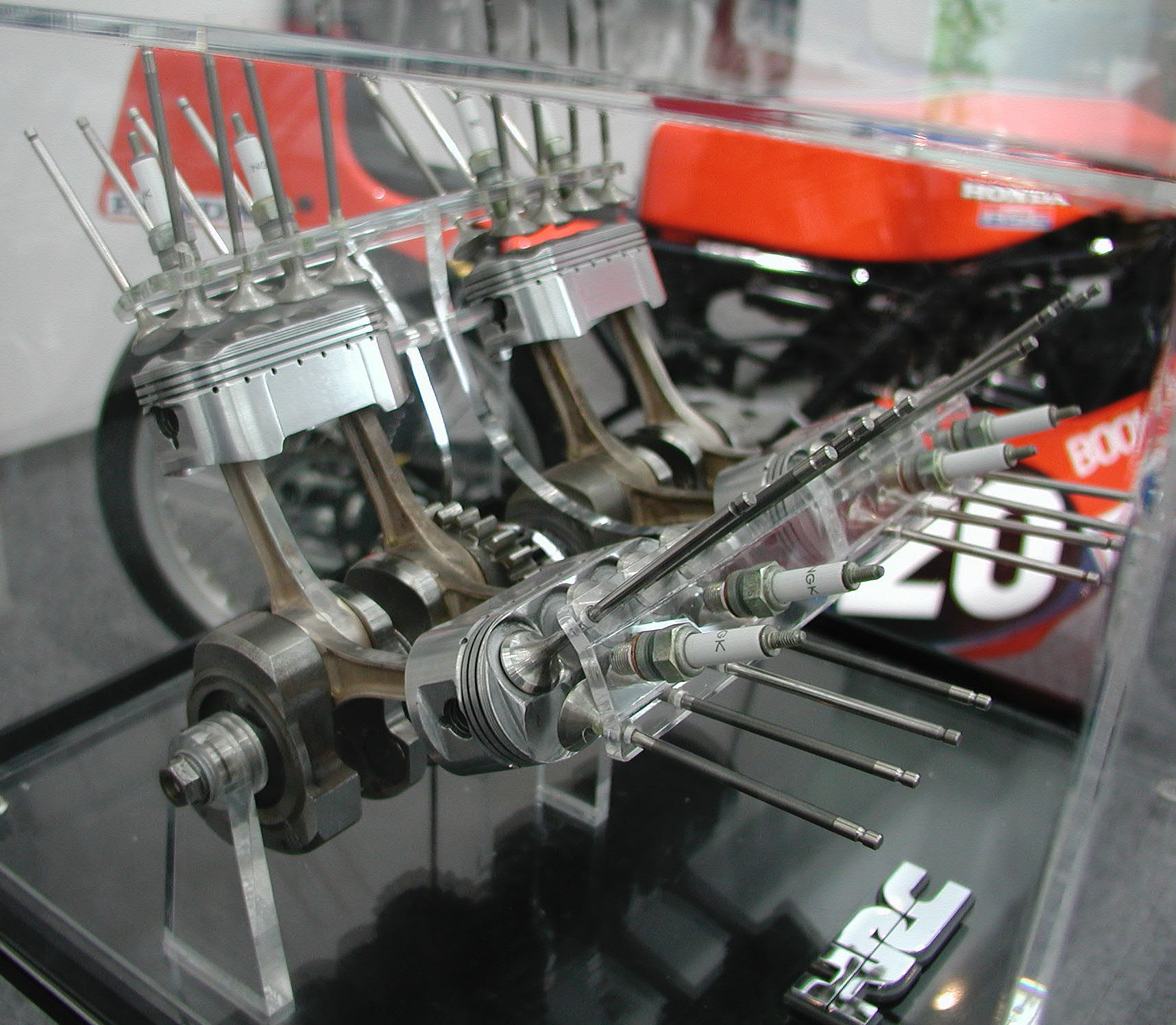
The 8 valve per cylinder, two connecting rod per piston, oval piston Honda NR engine

Honda NR

Rotary engines

Megola, Killinger and Freund Motorcycle

Turbine engines

- MTT Turbine Superbike (turboshaft)
- Jet Reaction afterburning turbojet

Other jet engine motorcycle prototypes exist, but never have been commercialized.

Rocket

Several rocket-powered motorcycles have been built, including:

- Fritz von Opel's 1928 "Monster" rocket bike
- Skycycle X-2 rocket developed for Evel Knievel's Snake River Canyon jump attempt
- Eric Teboul's rocket-powered dragbike that set the world record at Santa Pod Raceway in 2009

== Hydrogen ==
The joint four manufacture introducing one of first H2-based IC Engine for motorcycle.

== Diesel ==
Only very small numbers of diesel engined motorcycles have ever been built. The improved fuel efficiency is offset by the increased weight, reduced acceleration and potential difficulty of starting, at least in colder climates. Enfield India built a few from 1965 onwards but is no longer doing so. In November 2006, the Dutch company E.V.A. Products BV Holland announced their first diesel-powered motorcycle, its Track T-800CDI, using an 800 cc three-cylinder Daimler Chrysler diesel engine.

Several armies are moving to an all-diesel engine fleet to reduce the fire risks of gasoline and the need to provide two different fuels. This includes their dispatch riders as well, encouraging the market for diesel motorcycles. Interest in biofuels is also likely to encourage future developments for small Diesels.

Diesels are also available in both two- and four-stroke versions.

== Engine cooling ==
=== Liquid ===
Liquid-cooled motorcycles have a radiator, similar to the radiator on a car, which is the primary way their heat is dispersed. Coolant is constantly circulated between this radiator and the cylinders when the engine is running. While most off-road motorcycles have no radiator fan and rely on air flowing over the radiators from the forward motion of the motorcycle, many road motorcycles have a small fan attached to the radiator which is controlled by a thermostat. Some off-road motorcycles are liquid-cooled, and anti-dirt protection is attached to the radiator. The cooling effect of this fan is enough to prevent the engine overheating in most conditions, so liquid-cooled bikes are safe to use in a city, where traffic may frequently be at a standstill.

Emissions regulations and the market demand for maximum power are driving the motorcycle industry to liquid-cooling for most motorcycles. Even Harley-Davidson, a strong advocate of air-cooled motors, has recently added water cooling to the heads of their V-twin motors in their large touring models, with the radiators being hidden in the lower leg fairings. The Harley-Davidson Street 500, Street 750, and two V-Rod models have 60° V-twins that are fully water cooled, as opposed to the traditional air-cooled 45° V-twins.

=== Air ===
Most air-cooled motorcycles take advantage of air blowing past the cylinder and cylinder head while in motion to disperse heat. Frequent, sustained stationary periods may cause overheating. Some models, mostly scooters, are equipped with fans that force the air to go past the cylinder block, which solves the problem of city driving. The cylinders on air-cooled bikes are designed with fin heat sinks to aid in this process. Air-cooled bikes are cheaper, simpler and lighter than their water-cooled counterparts.

=== Oil ===
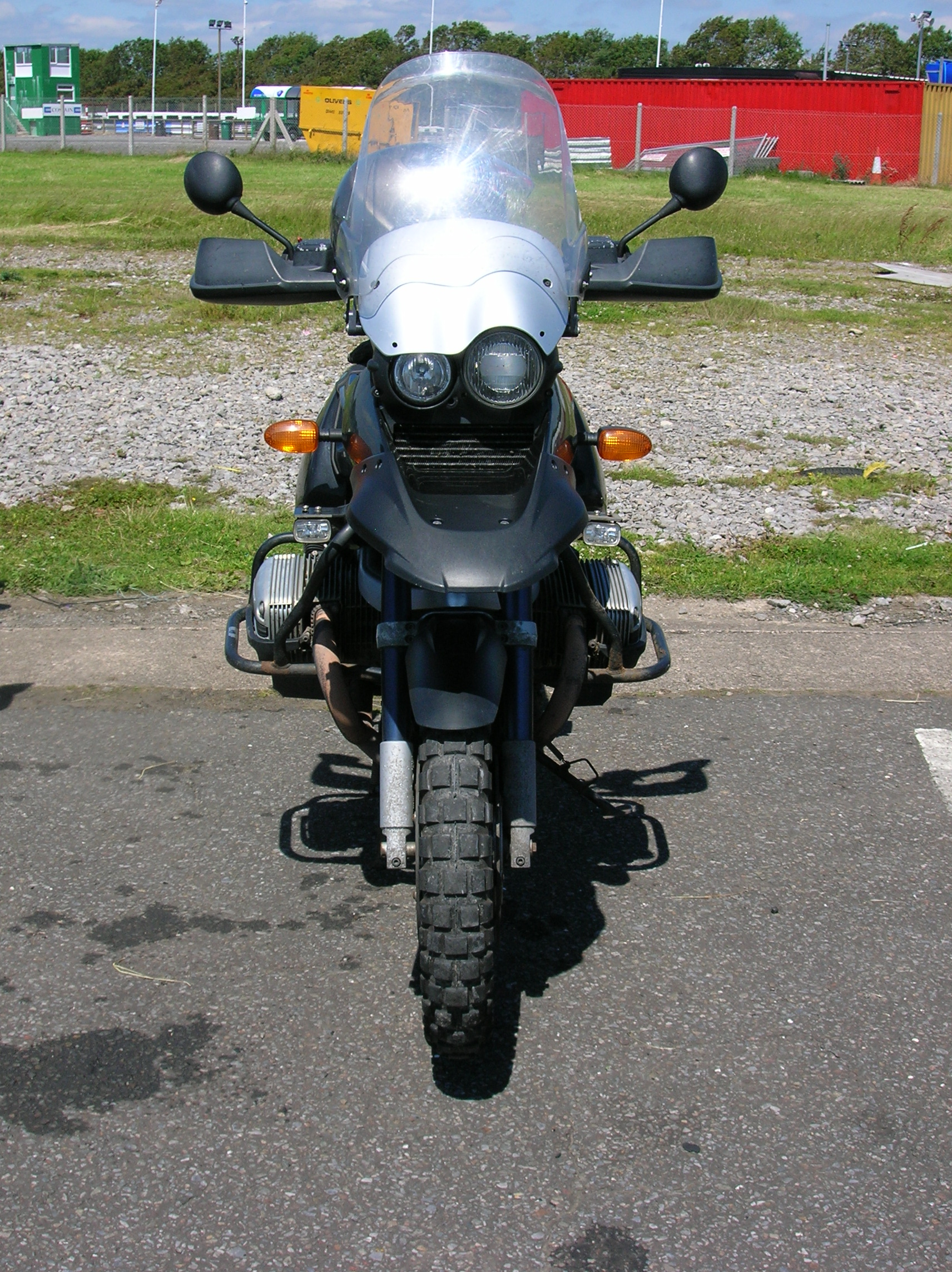
The BMW R1150GS has an oil cooler below the headlights and fins for air cooling on the cylinders.

Some manufacturers use a hybrid cooling method where engine oil is circulated between the engine case and a small radiator. Here the oil doubles as cooling liquid, prompting the name "oil-cooling." Suzuki has produced many oil-cooled motorcycles. Modern BMW R-series flat-twin motorcycles, such as the R1150GS, use air and oil cooling. Polaris's Victory motorcycles use oil/air cooling exclusively.

== Other components ==
=== Fuel Injection ===
Fuel injection and computer engine management systems are now normal on middle range and larger motorcycles and are increasingly being incorporated onto the smaller machines, partly driven by better emission control and lower maintenance but mostly by manufacturing cost considerations.

=== Ignition ===
Ignition systems moved from magneto in the 1950s to battery-coil-contact breaker points, and these were increasingly superseded by Capacitor Discharge Ignition (CDI) from the 1980s. Small, single-cylinder motorcycles abandoned the flywheel magneto system with contact breakers to similar flywheel driven solid-state systems at about the same time.

=== Turbo and Superchargers ===
Superchargers, or blowers, were common in the GPs, until they were banned. The first supercharger on a production motorcycle was the 2015 Kawasaki Ninja H2 and H2R. The big four made a turbocharged bike, and Honda made two, mainly as an exercise in technical expertise and later discontinued them for more conventional methods. Bolt-on superchargers are available for street bikes and are essential for performance applications such as drag bikes and land speed record streamliners. Most sports bikes now use a ram-air induction system where as road speed increases, more air is forced through ducts in the fairing to pressurize the airbox. The first on a production motorcycle was the 1990 Kawasaki Ninja ZX-11. Not to be confused with the original Ram-Air system where an air scoop/cowl was fitted to the top of the cylinder heads of Suzuki two-stroke engines to aid cooling.

== See also ==
- List of motorcycles by type of engine
- Motorcycle motor powered car
- List of motorized trikes
- Aircraft engine
