= Killinger and Freund Motorcycle =

1935 front-wheel drive motorcycle

The Killinger and Freund Motorcycle was an attempt in 1935 by a group of five German engineers from Munich to design a more streamlined and modified version of the German Megola front-wheel drive motorcycle. The work took three years to complete but the result was impressive. The engine displacement stayed the same as the Megola at 600 cc but was much lighter and more simplified than a standard 100 cc motorcycle of the time.

== Design ==
The motorcycle featured a three-cylinder two-stroke engine built right into the front wheel, transmission and clutch, with more comfortable front and rear suspension. Streamlining was important as aerodynamics was the first priority of the team who wanted all the moving parts covered, dirt and mud protection, and an elegant style. Other priorities were that the motorcycle be multi-cylinder and possess front- wheel-drive. Their design met with success.

=== Aerodynamics and steering ===
The first impressions of the new motorcycle was of a streamlined racing machine with rounded covers for the front and rear wheels, aerodynamically improved fork, frame, and fuel tank all built on a tubular framework covered in sheet metal.

The rear suspension was linked to the lower end of the tubular frame and featured flexible rubber and metal elements that did not require servicing. Steering was much like an ordinary motorcycle but with more vertical telescopic elements than usual, which translated into a wheelbase that wouldn't change much whenever the front fork dived.

=== Front wheel drive, carburetor, and ignition ===
The new front-wheel-drive was a vast improvement over the old Megola design. The weight of the engine was lower. The front wheel with integrated engine had a combined weight of 50 kg (110 lb). Additionally, a custom carburetor without a float needle didn't have the problems caused by vibration. And finally, the light-weight battery ignition allowed trouble-free engine starts and helped to keep the engine weight low. The distributor and the points were located in the hub. The technicians originally intended to build a dynastarter. These improvements would have been impossible to add to the old Megola design.

=== Engine, timing, clutch, and transmission ===
The three cylinder two-stroke engine used a Drehschieber ("rotary valve", a turning disk, with intake holes for exact timing of the fuel-air mixture intake). The fuel-air mixture was sucked in by the vacuum in the three crankshaft housings as usual. The Drehschieber does the intake timing for all three cylinders. The engine was not a radial engine associated with aircraft and there was no need for a flywheel. All three cranks worked on one common gear. This arrangement and the recoil of the pistons in the turning direction secured a perfect balance of the moving parts. The cylinders were made of KS (Kolbenschmidt) iron cylinder walls and were embedded in the Silumin alloy engine housing. The only things that could be visibly identified as engine parts were the alloy cylinder heads with multiple cooling fins and the exhaust pipes located between the spokes of the cast alloy front wheel. These flat spokes were designed to serve as a functional cooling fan. The two-speed transmission was built as a differential transmission and used slope-meshed gears. The clutch was made of conventional clutch disks. The clutch (with the springs at the outer circle) was located in front of the transmission. The transmission was actuated by foot-operated steel cables. All parts of the engine allowed easy access for service work. After the removal of the engine – only two bolts and some wiring had to be removed – all important parts were within reach.

=== Tires, shock absorbers, fuel, and seat adjustment ===
The tire could also be removed easily. You had to unlock a safety mechanism and then remove the tire completely with the split rim (very similar to the split rim developed by BMW). The front brake was installed in the hub. The rear suspension also had telescopic oil-filled shock absorbers. The gasoline flowed down through flexible hoses. A panel in the frame allowed easy access to the seat springs to adjust the hardness of the seat's suspension.

== Operational history ==
The Killinger and Freund Motorrad (motorcycle) was test-driven after the engine was tested on a test stand. Its total weight was 135 kg (297 lb).

This design was intended for civilian production but the start of World War II cancelled those plans. One motorcycle was discovered by the US Army in the spring of 1945 at a German military installation but it is not known if this was the original prototype or another Killinger und Freund Motorrad. It was sold as scrap in the United States after a short period of display. In 2010, Motohistory.net had a short article detailing the bike's current condition.

== Today ==
The French moped VéloSoleX is a front drive. The engine is also available as an add-on for bicycles.

== Sources ==
- Motorrad Magazine, October 1938 Issue
