= Charles Benjamin Redrup =

British aeronautical engineer and inventor

- Born: 1878; Newport, Wales
- Died: 1961 (aged 82–83)

Charles Benjamin Redrup (1878–1961) was a British aeronautical engineer and inventor, who designed several innovative axial engines.

== Early life ==
Redrup was born in Newport, Wales, in 1878, to wealthy parents. His father moved to Barry, Vale of Glamorgan shortly afterwards. The Redrup family had 10 children, all of whom were able to receive a good private education, due to the family money. Charles Redrup was interested in engineering from an early age and his father paid for him to take an apprenticeship with the Great Western Railway company for a five-year period. After a short round-trip aboard a merchant ship to America, Redrup returned to Barry, entered into a partnership with Alban Richards, the son of a Barry blacksmith, and set up the Barry Motor Company.

He started his married life in the aforementioned parental-gifted house and by 1925 Charles and Jessie Redrup had a family of eight.

== Career ==
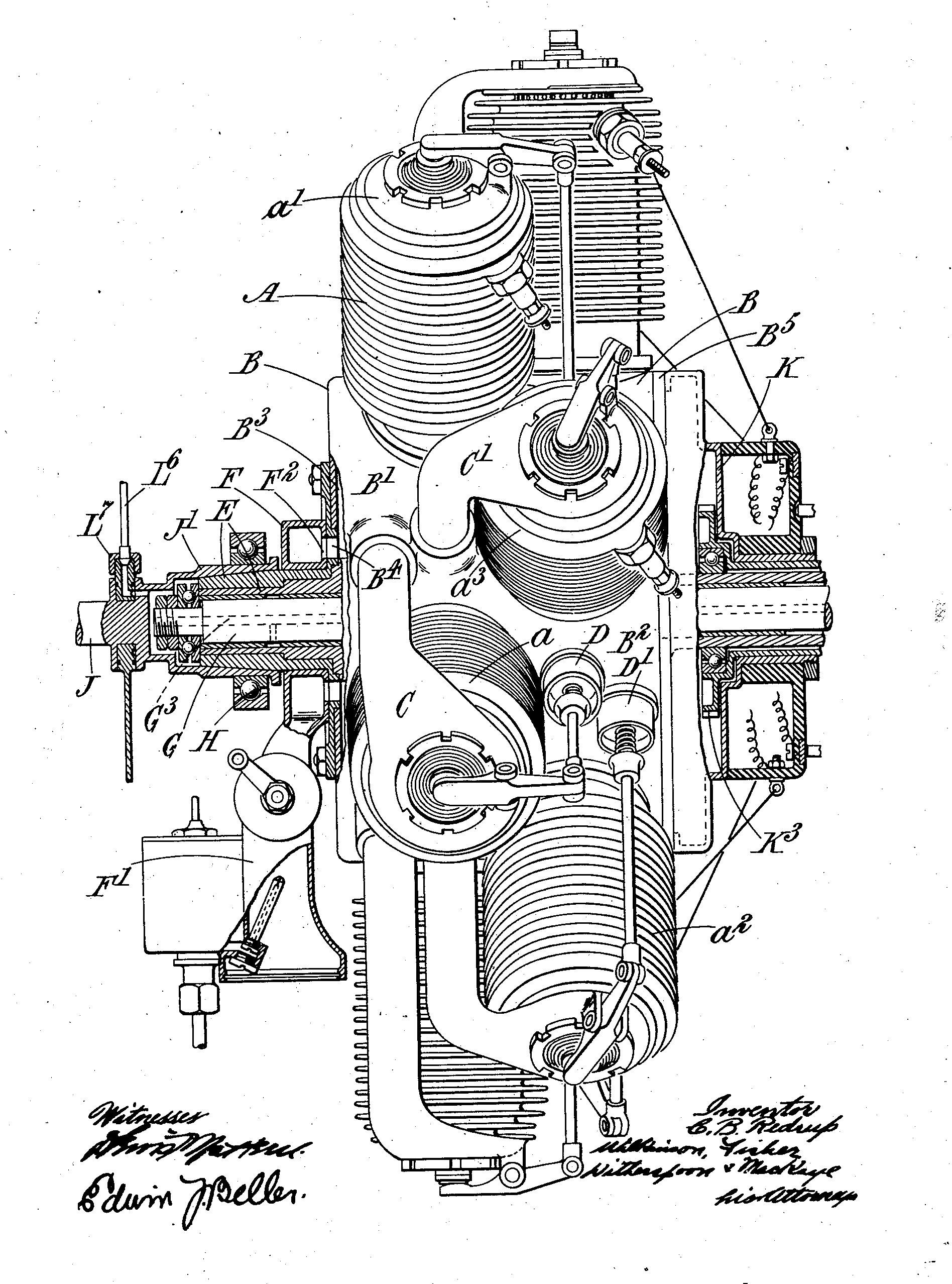
Revolving-cylinder internal-combustion engine - US Patent 1047839

The Barry Engine first appeared in 1904 when it was exhibited at the Stanley Exhibition in London's Burners Hall. Designed by Redrup, the engine was a two-cylinder supercharged rotary engine. The engine was incorporated in the unusual "Barry" motorcycle, which retained the pedals of a conventional cycle, with the engine rotating on the forward frame tube between the driver's knees. It was exhibited in London in 1905, attracting a large amount of interest and being reviewed by a number of journals at the time.

Later models of the motorcycle dispensed with the pedals, and the engine was lowered to improve the centre of gravity. No known models of the engine exist but a similar Redrup 1912 rotary aircraft engine is in the Museum of Science and Industry in Manchester, and Redrup Radial, later engines designed and built by Redrup, are still in existence.

In 1913 Redrup moved to Leeds where he designed and built engines for Vickers for their aircraft.

In 1919 he designed a three-cylinder 309 cc radial engine for motorcycles in partnership with Leeds motorcycle builder Monty Beaumont, and also sold the engines for industrial use. The "Redrup Radial", as the motorcycle was known, was built in the UK from 1919 to 1922, though actual numbers built are unclear and probably less than 150. The magazine The Motor Cycle tested the engine and found little wrong with it.

Redrup carried out most of his development work in a simply-equipped home workshop, and often said that he made most of his engines with little more than "a knife and fork". He was the inventor of "Wobble-Plate" axial engines, which powered a motor launch and a Crossley Motors car in the 1920s. A variant of the engine also flew in a Simmonds Spartan aircraft in 1929, and was exhibited at the Olympia Air Show in July of that year. He also designed radial engines for Avro in the 1920s.

As a result of his engine shown at the Olympia Air Show, he was engaged by the Bristol Tramways and Carriage Company to design an engine for them, and moved to Bristol where he designed the Bristol Axial Engine. It was a 7-litre, 9 cylinder, wobble-plate type engine. It was originally conceived as a power unit for buses, possibly because its compact format would allow it to be installed beneath the vehicle's floor. The engine had a single rotary valve to control induction and exhaust. Several variants were used in Bristol buses during the late 1930s. The engine went through several versions from RR1 to RR4, which had a power output of 145 hp at 2900 rpm. Development was halted in 1936 following a change of management at the Bristol company.

During World War II he worked on top-secret armament projects for the Avro Lancaster and other aircraft, including the hydraulic drive for the Vickers Type 464 bouncing bomb which was used in Operation Chastise in 1943.

After the war he designed more motor-cycle engines, including an axial engine, and large 1,000 and 2,000 hp axial aircraft engines. A 3-cylinder Redrup 1948 Radial Motorcycle is preserved in the Sammy Miller Museum. The motorcycle uses a smaller 250 cc version of his radial engine mounted horizontally in a Royal Enfield motorcycle frame, and was assembled by him and his son.

== See also ==
- Barry Engine
- Swashplate engine
