= Rotary engine =

Reciprocating engine with a rotating crankcase

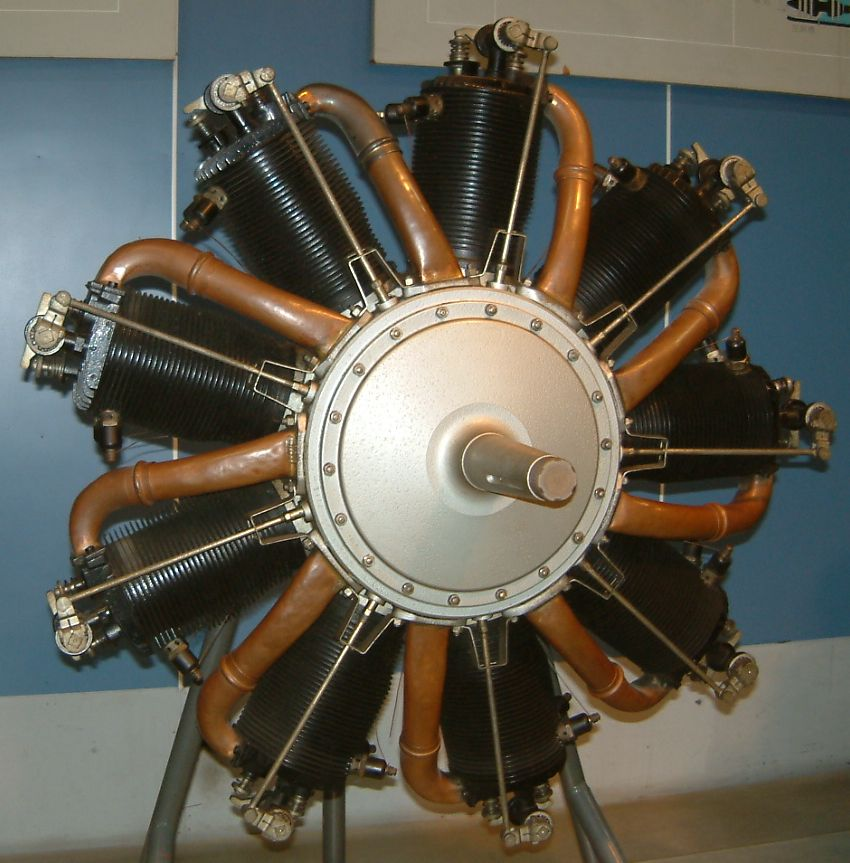
An 80 horsepower (60 kW) rated Le Rhône 9C, a typical rotary engine of WWI. The copper pipes carry the fuel-air mixture from the crankcase to the cylinder heads acting collectively as an intake manifold.

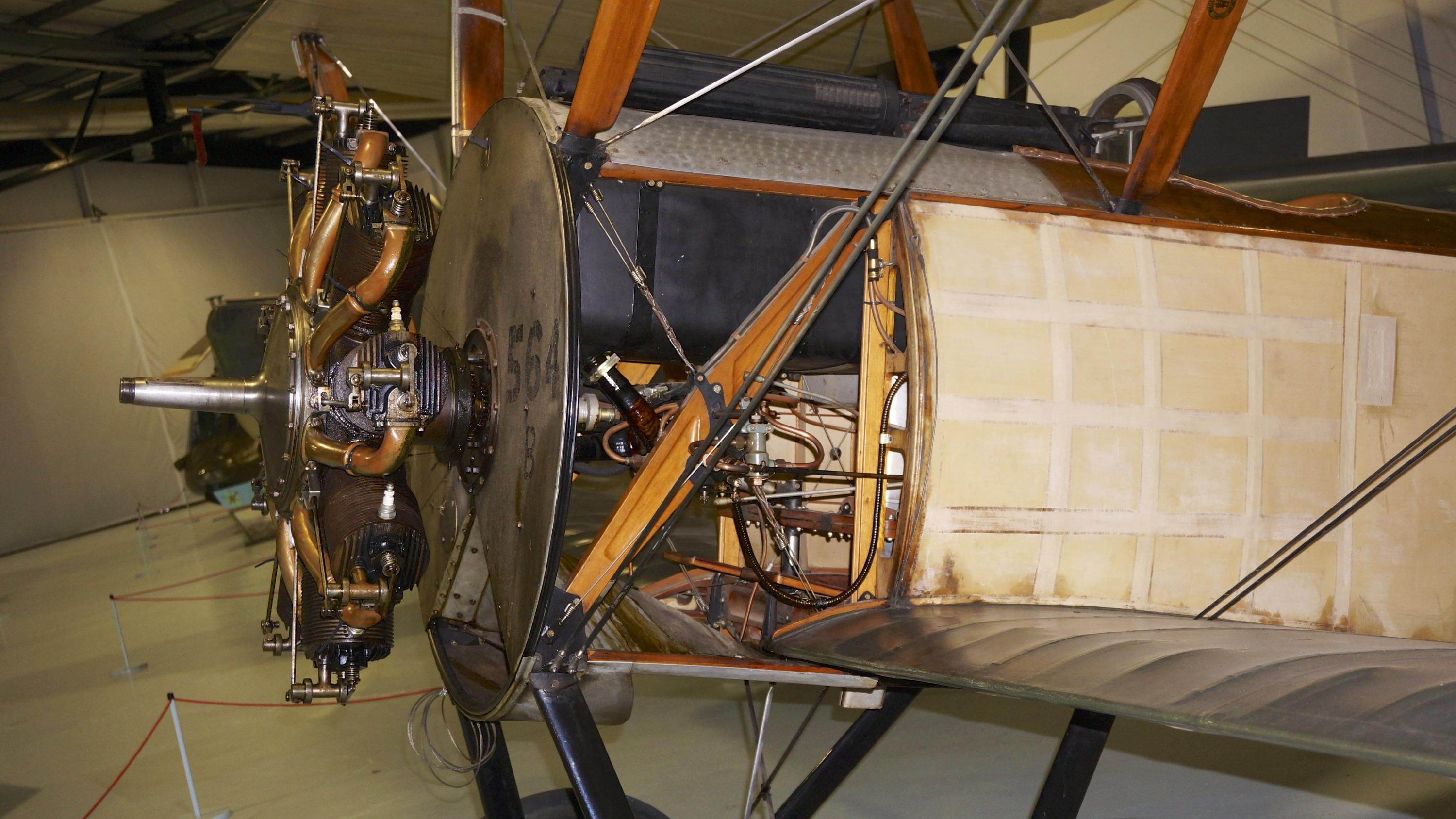
This Le Rhône 9C installed on a Sopwith Pup fighter aircraft at the Fleet Air Arm Museum. Note the narrowness of the mounting pedestal to the fixed crankshaft (2013), and the size of the engine

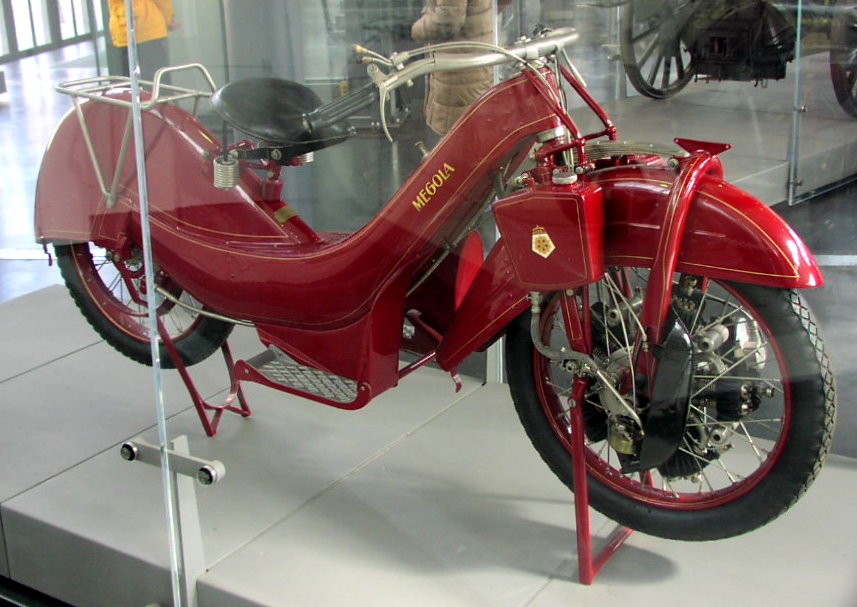
Megola motorcycle with rotary engine mounted in the front wheel

The rotary engine is a type of reciprocating internal combustion engine, usually designed with an odd number of cylinders per row in a radial configuration. In most designs, the engine's crankshaft remained stationary in operation, while the entire crankcase and its attached cylinders rotated around it as a unit. Its main application was in aviation, although it also saw use in some motorcycles and automobiles.

Rotary aero engines were widely used as an alternative to conventional inline engines (straight or V) during World War I and the years immediately preceding that conflict. They have been described as "a very efficient solution to the problems of power output, weight, and reliability".

By the early 1920s, rotary aero engines had largely been superseded by other engine configurations.

== Description ==
=== Distinction between "rotary" and "radial" engines ===
A rotary engine is essentially an Otto cycle engine, usually with cylinders arranged radially around a central crankshaft like a conventional radial engine, but instead of having a fixed crankcase and cylinders with a rotating crankshaft, the crankcase and cylinders rotate as a unit relative to the crankshaft. In the most common form, the crankshaft was fixed solidly to the airframe, and the propeller was bolted to the front of the crankcase.

Animation of a seven-cylinder rotary engine with every-other-piston firing order.

This difference also has a significant impact on design (lubrication, ignition, fuel admission, cooling, etc.) and operation (see below).

The Musée de l'Air et de l'Espace in Paris has on display a special, "sectioned" working model of an engine with seven radially disposed cylinders. It alternates between rotary and radial modes to demonstrate the difference between the internal motions of the two types of engine.

=== Arrangement ===
Like "fixed" radial engines, rotaries were generally built with an odd number of cylinders (usually 5, 7 or 9), so that a consistent every-other-piston firing order could be maintained, to provide smooth running. Rotary engines with an even number of cylinders were mostly of the "two row" type.

Most rotary engines were arranged with the cylinders pointing outwards from a single crankshaft, in the same general form as a radial, but there were also rotary boxer engines and even one-cylinder rotaries.

=== Advantages and drawbacks ===
Three key factors contributed to the rotary engine's success at the time:

- Smooth running: Rotaries delivered power very smoothly because (relative to the engine mounting point) there were no reciprocating parts, and the relatively large rotating mass of the crankcase/cylinders (as a unit) acted as a flywheel.
- Improved cooling: when the engine was running, the rotating crankcase/cylinder assembly created its own fast-moving cooling airflow, even with the aircraft at rest.
- Weight advantage: rotaries shared with other radial configuration engines the advantage of a small, flat crankcase. The superior air-cooling imparted by the moving engine also meant that cylinders could be made with thinner walls and shallower cooling fins. Their power-to-weight ratio was further enhanced by the flywheel effect of the rotating engine assembly.

As stationary engines became more reliable and achieved better specific weights and fuel consumption, rotary aero engines were gradually superseded.

- Rotary aero engines generally used a total-loss oiling system. In order to reach the whole engine, the lubricant was supplied to the crankcase through the hollow crankshaft, but the centrifugal force of the revolving crankcase made collection and recirculation difficult. In commonly used systems, the lubricant entered the crankcase with the fuel-air mixture, as in many two-stroke engines.
- Increases in power generally came with increases in mass and size, increasing the gyroscopic effects of the rotating mass of the engine. Aircraft with these engines could therefore have unusual handling characteristics, especially for inexperienced pilots.
- Increasing amounts of power were consumed in overcoming the air resistance of the spinning engine.
- Some rotary engines had limited or difficult engine controls (see below), which could result in fuel waste.

The late World War I Bentley BR2 was the largest and most powerful rotary engine; it reached a point beyond which this type of engine could not be further developed, and it was the last of its kind to be adopted into RAF service.

== Rotary engine control ==
=== Monosoupape rotaries ===
It is often asserted that rotary engines had no throttle and hence power could only be reduced by intermittently cutting the ignition using a "blip" switch. This was particularly characteristic of the "Monosoupape" (single-valve) type, which took most of its air into the cylinder through the exhaust valve, which remained open for a portion of the downstroke of the piston. Thus, the mixture of fuel and air in the cylinder could not be controlled by throttling the crankcase intake. The fuel control of a Monosoupape provided only a limited degree of speed regulation, as opening it made the mixture too rich, while closing it made it too lean; either extreme could quickly stall the engine or cause damage. Early models featured a form of variable valve timing in an attempt to provide greater control, but this caused the valves to burn and was therefore abandoned.

The only way of running some Monosoupape engines smoothly at reduced revolutions was with a switch that changed the normal firing sequence, so that each cylinder fired only once per two or three engine revolutions while the engine remained more or less in balance. However, the fuel charge and oil continued to enter the cylinders and were exhausted unburned. Prolonged use of the switch could result in large quantities of unburned fuel and oil collecting in the exhaust and lower cowling, creating a fire hazard.

=== "Normal" rotaries ===
Most rotaries had conventional inlet valves, so that the fuel and lubricating oil were taken into the cylinders already mixed with air, as in a conventional four-stroke engine. Although the spinning crankcase precluded the use of a conventional carburettor capable of maintaining a constant fuel-air ratio over a range of throttle openings, it was possible to adjust the air supply through a separate flap valve or "Bloctube". The pilot needed to set the throttle to the desired position and then adjust the fuel-air mixture using a separate "fine adjustment" lever that controlled the air supply valve, in the manner of a manual choke control. Due to the rotary engine's large rotational inertia, it was possible to adjust the appropriate fuel-air mixture by trial and error without stalling it, although this varied between engine types and required considerable practice.

Throttling a running engine back to reduce revolutions was possible by closing the fuel valve to the required position while readjusting the fuel-air mixture to suit. This process also required careful adjustment, so reducing power, especially when landing, was often accomplished instead by intermittently cutting the ignition using the blip switch.

Cutting cylinders using ignition switches had the drawback of allowing fuel to continue passing through the engine, oiling the spark plugs and making smooth restarting problematic. The unburned oil-fuel mixture could also collect in the cowling, creating a fire hazard when ignition was restored. Part or all of the bottom of the generally circular cowling on many rotary-engined aircraft was cut away or fitted with drainage slots.

Pilots of surviving or reproduction aircraft fitted with rotary engines still find that the blip switch is useful while landing, as it provides a more reliable, quicker way to initiate power if needed, rather than risk a sudden engine stall, or the failure of a windmilling engine to restart at the worst possible moment.

== History ==
Rotary steam engines were discussed in an 1847 Scientific American article as being impractical for general use.

=== Millet ===
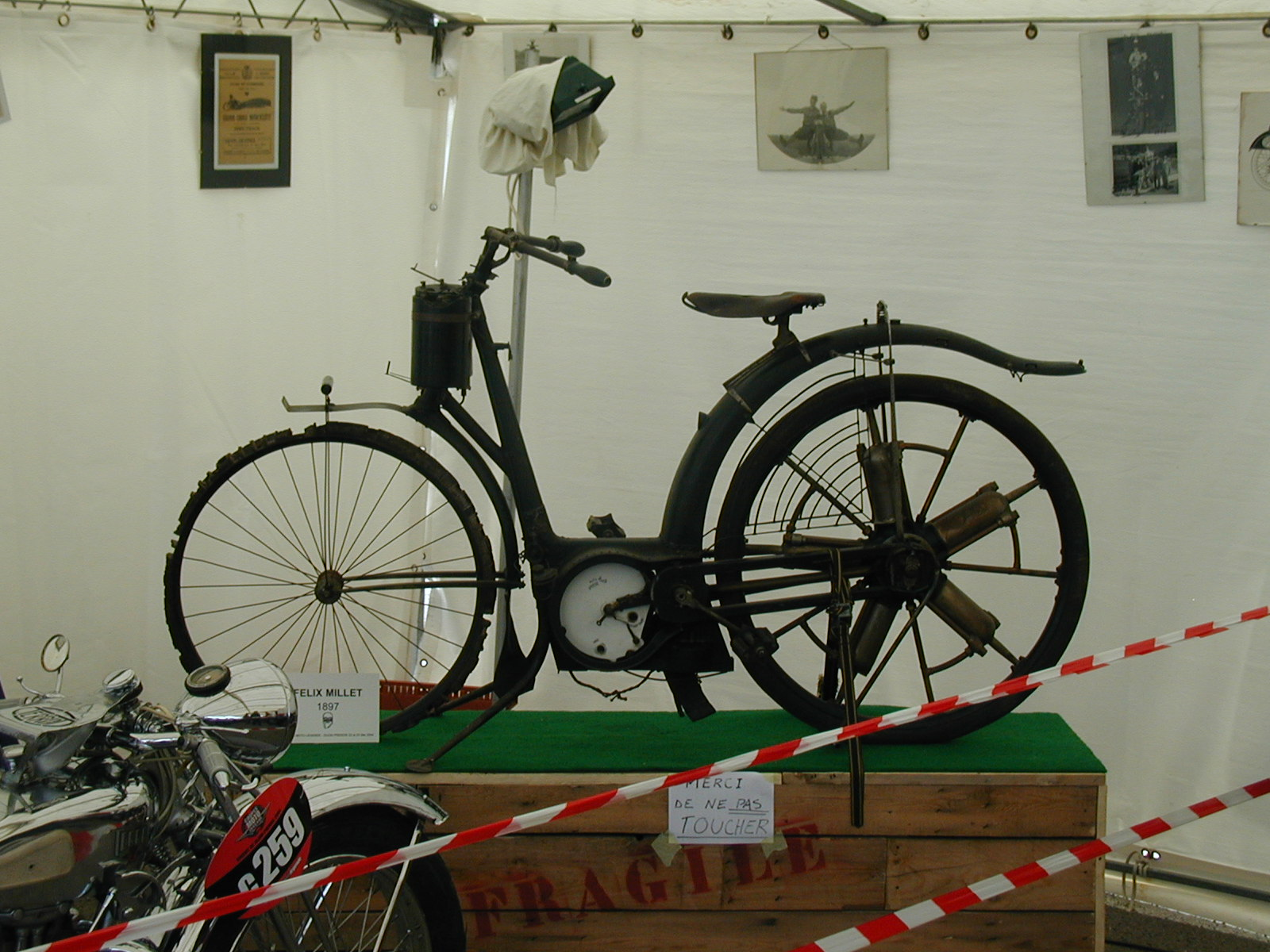
An 1897 Félix Millet motorcycle

Félix Millet showed a 5-cylinder rotary engine built into a bicycle wheel at the Exposition Universelle in Paris in 1889. Millet had patented the engine in 1888, so must be considered the pioneer of the internal combustion rotary engine. A machine powered by his engine took part in the Paris-Bordeaux-Paris race of 1895 and the system was put into production by Darracq and Company London in 1900.

=== Hargrave ===
Lawrence Hargrave first developed a rotary engine in 1889 using compressed air, intending to use it in powered flight. Materials weight and lack of quality machining prevented it becoming an effective power unit.

=== Balzer ===
Stephen M. Balzer of New York, a former watchmaker, constructed rotary engines in the 1890s. He was interested in the rotary layout for two main reasons:

- To generate 100 hp (75 kW) at the low rpm at which the engines of the day ran, the pulse resulting from each combustion stroke was quite large. To damp out these pulses, engines needed a large flywheel, which added weight. In the rotary design the engine acted as its own flywheel, thus rotaries could be lighter than similarly sized conventional engines.
- The cylinders had good cooling airflow over them, even when the aircraft was at rest—which was important, as the low airspeed of aircraft of the time provided limited cooling airflow, and alloys of the day were less advanced. Balzer's early designs even dispensed with cooling fins, though subsequent rotaries did have this common feature of air-cooled engines.

Balzer produced a 3-cylinder, rotary engined car in 1894, then later became involved in Langley's Aerodrome attempts, which bankrupted him while he tried to make much larger versions of his engines. Balzer's rotary engine was later converted to static radial operation by Langley's assistant, Charles M. Manly, creating the notable Manly–Balzer engine.

=== De Dion-Bouton ===
The famous De Dion-Bouton company produced an experimental 4-cylinder rotary engine in 1899. Though intended for aviation use, it was not fitted to any aircraft.

=== Adams-Farwell ===
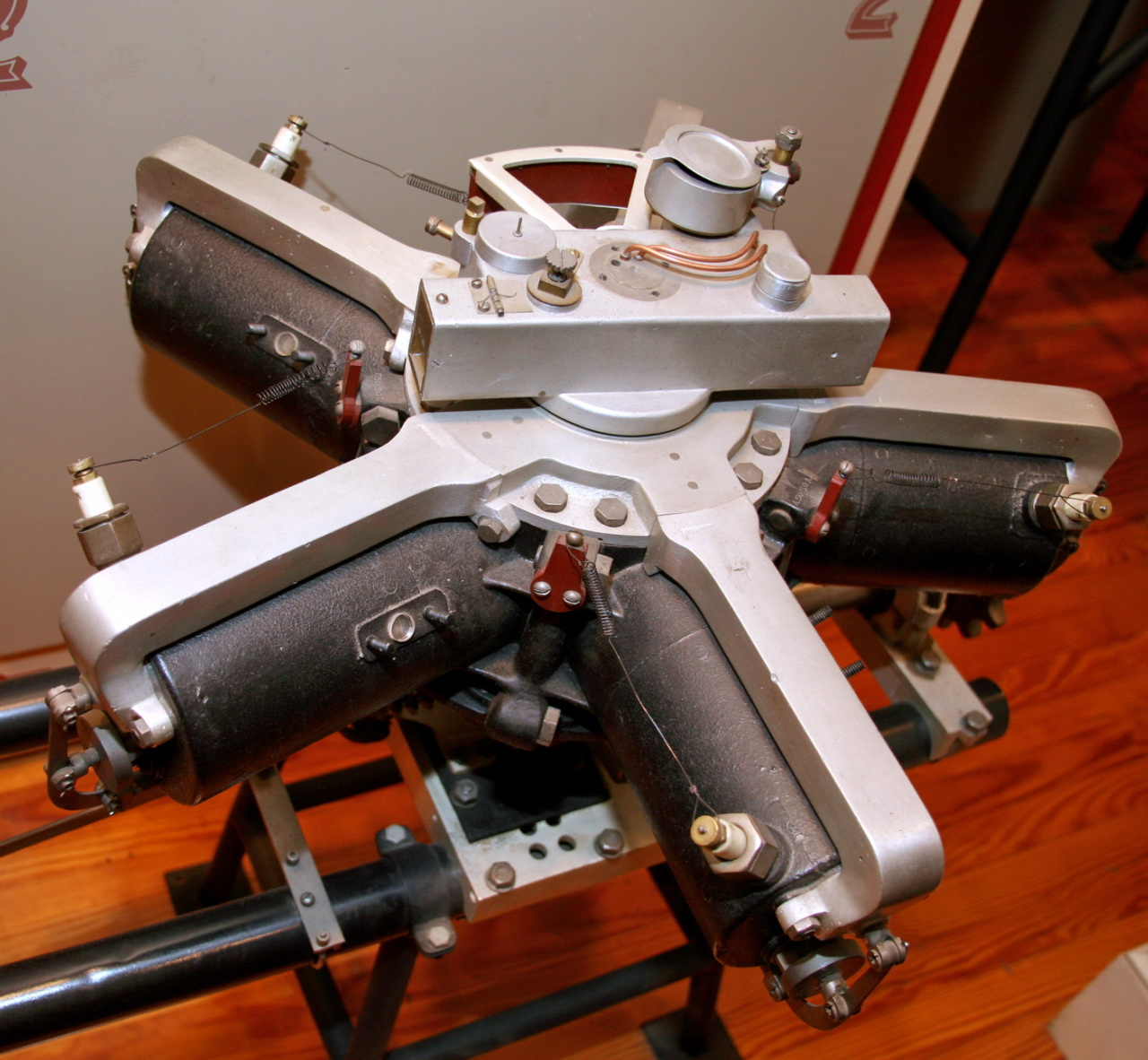
An Adams-Farwell five cylinder rotary adapted for helicopter experimentation

The Adams-Farwell firm's automobiles, with the firm's first rolling prototypes using 3-cylinder rotary engines designed by Fay Oliver Farwell in 1898, led to production Adams-Farwell cars with first the 3-cylinder, then very shortly thereafter 5-cylinder rotary engines later in 1906, as another early American automaker utilizing rotary engines expressly manufactured for automotive use. Emil Berliner sponsored its development of the 5-cylinder Adams-Farwell rotary engine design concept as a lightweight power unit for his unsuccessful helicopter experiments. Adams-Farwell engines later powered fixed-wing aircraft in the US after 1910. It has also been asserted that the Gnôme design was derived from the Adams-Farwell, since an Adams-Farwell car is reported to have been demonstrated to the French Army in 1904. In contrast to the later Gnôme engines, and much like the later Clerget 9B and Bentley BR1 aviation rotaries, the Adams-Farwell rotaries had conventional exhaust and inlet valves mounted in the cylinder heads.

=== Gnome ===
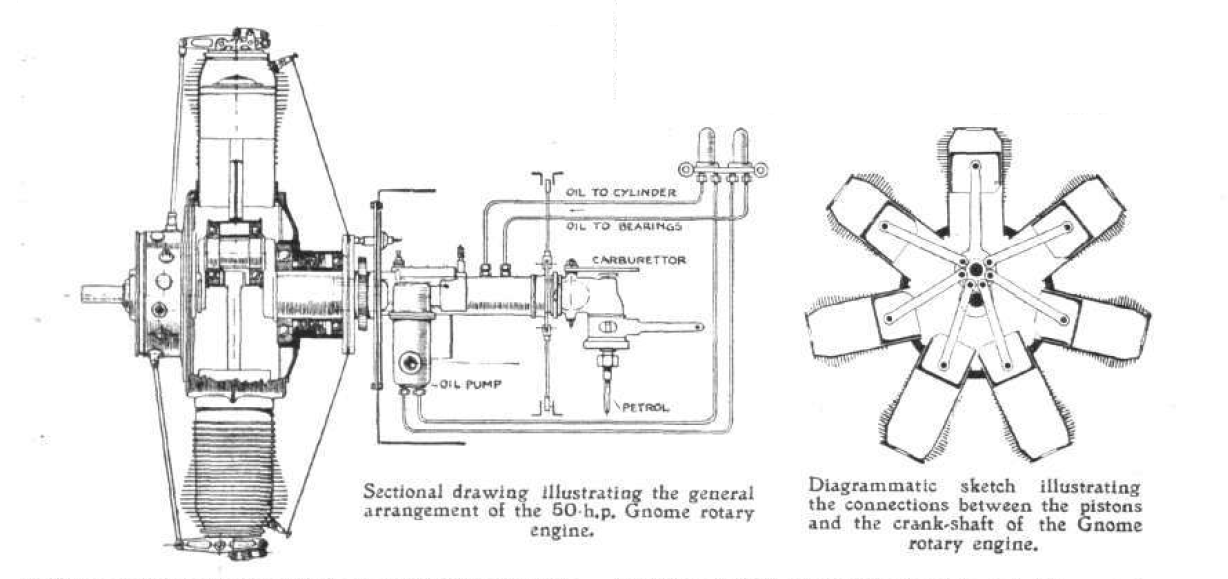
Sectional views of Gnome engine

The Gnome engine was the work of the three Seguin brothers, Louis, Laurent and Augustin. They were talented engineers and the grandsons of famous French engineer Marc Seguin. In 1906 the eldest brother, Louis, had formed the Société des Moteurs Gnome to build stationary engines for industrial use, having licensed production of the Gnom single-cylinder stationary engine from Motorenfabrik Oberursel—who, in turn, built licensed Gnome engines for German aircraft during World War I.

Louis was joined by his brother Laurent who designed a rotary engine specifically for aircraft use, using Gnom engine cylinders. The brothers' first experimental engine is said to have been a 5-cylinder model that developed 34 hp (25 kW), and was a radial rather than rotary engine, but no photographs survive of the five-cylinder experimental model. The Seguin brothers then turned to rotary engines in the interests of better cooling, and the world's first production rotary engine, the 7-cylinder, air-cooled 50 hp (37 kW) "Omega" was shown at the 1908 Paris automobile show. The first Gnome Omega built still exists, and is now in the collection of the Smithsonian's National Air and Space Museum. The Seguins used the highest strength material available - recently developed nickel steel alloy - and kept the weight down by machining components from solid metal, using the best American and German machine tools to create the engine's components; the cylinder wall of a 50 hp Gnome was only 1.5 mm (0.059 inches) thick, while the connecting rods were milled with deep central channels to reduce weight. While somewhat low powered in terms of units of power per litre, its power-to-weight ratio was an outstanding 1 hp (0.75 kW) per kg.

The following year, 1909, the inventor Roger Ravaud fitted one to his Aéroscaphe, a combination hydrofoil/aircraft, which he entered in the motor boat and aviation contests at Monaco. Henry Farman's use of the Gnome at the famous Rheims aircraft meet that year brought it to prominence, when he won the Grand Prix for the greatest non-stop distance flown—180 kilometres (110 mi)—and also set a world record for endurance flight. The very first successful seaplane flight, of Henri Fabre's Le Canard, was powered by a Gnome Omega on March 28, 1910, near Marseille.

Production of Gnome rotaries increased rapidly, with some 4,000 being produced before World War I, and Gnome also produced a two-row version (the 100 h.p. Double Omega), the larger 80 hp Gnome Lambda and the 160 hp two-row Double Lambda. By the standards of other engines of the period, the Gnome was considered not particularly temperamental, and was credited as the first engine able to run for ten hours between overhauls.

In 1913 the Seguin brothers introduced the new Monosoupape ("single valve") series, which replaced inlet valves in the pistons by using a single valve in each cylinder head, which doubled as inlet and exhaust valve. The engine speed was controlled by varying the opening time and extent of the exhaust valves using levers acting on the valve tappet rollers, a system later abandoned due to valves burning. The weight of the Monosoupape was slightly less than the earlier two-valve engines, and it used less lubricating oil. The 100 hp Monosoupape was built with 9 cylinders, and developed its rated power at 1,200 rpm. The later 160 hp nine-cylinder Gnome 9N rotary engine used the Monosoupape valve design while adding the safety factor of a dual ignition system, and was the last known rotary engine design to use such a cylinder head valving format. The 9N also featured an unusual ignition setup that allowed output values of one-half, one-quarter and one-eighth power levels to be achieved through use of the coupe-switch and a special five-position rotary switch that selected which of the trio of alternate power levels would be selected when the coupe-switch was depressed, allowing it to cut out all spark voltage to all nine cylinders, at evenly spaced intervals to achieve the multiple levels of power reduction. The airworthy reproduction Fokker D.VIII parasol monoplane fighter at Old Rhinebeck Aerodrome, uniquely powered with a Gnome 9N, often demonstrates the use of its Gnome 9N's four-level output capability in both ground runs and in flight.

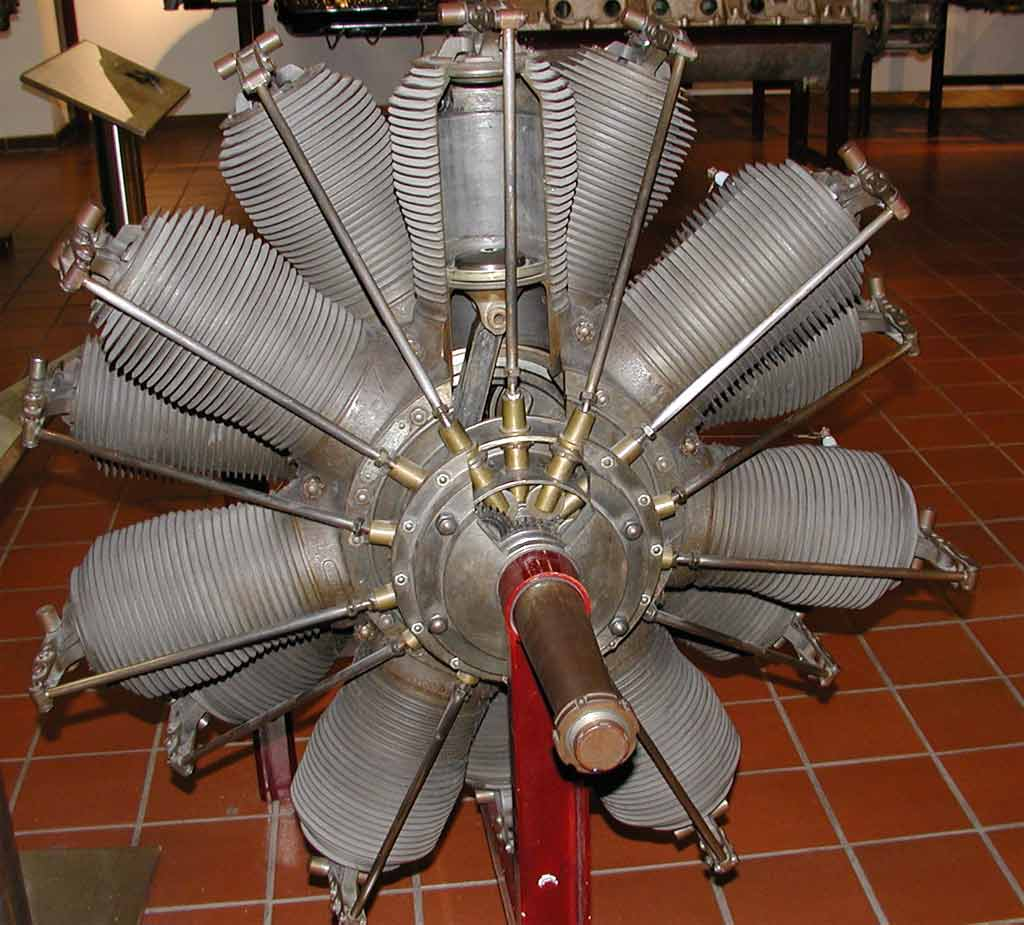
A German Oberursel U.III engine on museum display

Rotary engines produced by the Clerget and Le Rhône companies used conventional pushrod-operated valves in the cylinder head, but used the same principle of drawing the fuel mixture through the crankshaft, with the Le Rhônes having prominent copper intake tubes running from the crankcase to the top of each cylinder to admit the intake charge.

The 80 hp (60 kW) seven-cylinder Gnome was the standard at the outbreak of World War I, as the Gnome Lambda, and it quickly found itself being used in a large number of aircraft designs. It was so good that it was licensed by a number of companies, including the German Motorenfabrik Oberursel firm who designed the original Gnom engine. Oberursel was later purchased by Fokker, whose 80 hp Gnome Lambda copy was known as the Oberursel U.0. It was not at all uncommon for French Gnôme Lambdas, as used in the earliest examples of the Bristol Scout biplane, to meet German versions, powering Fokker E.I Eindeckers in combat, from the latter half of 1915 on.

The only attempts to produce twin-row rotary engines in any volume were undertaken by Gnome, with their Double Lambda fourteen-cylinder 160 hp design, and with the German Oberursel firm's early World War I clone of the Double Lambda design, the U.III of the same power rating. While an example of the Double Lambda went on to power one of the Deperdussin Monocoque racing aircraft to a world-record speed of nearly 204 km/h (126 mph) in September 1913, the Oberursel U.III is only known to have been fitted into a few German production military aircraft, the Fokker E.IV fighter monoplane and Fokker D.III fighter biplane, both of whose failures to become successful combat types were partially due to the poor quality of the German powerplant, which was prone to wearing out after only a few hours of combat flight.

=== World War I ===
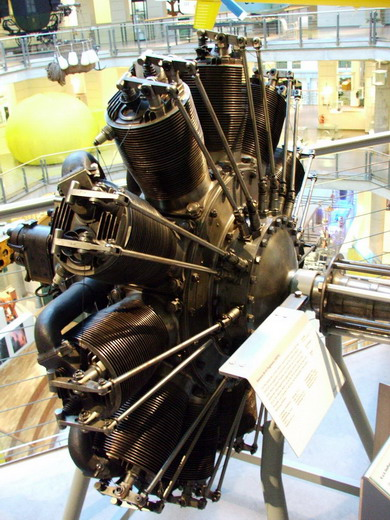
A Siemens-Halske Sh.III preserved at the Technisches Museum Wien (Vienna Museum of Technology). This engine powered a number of German fighter aircraft types towards the end of World War I

The favourable power-to-weight ratio of the rotaries was their greatest advantage. While larger, heavier aircraft relied almost exclusively on conventional in-line engines, many fighter aircraft designers preferred rotaries right up to the end of the war.

Rotaries had a number of disadvantages, notably very high fuel consumption, partially because the engine was typically run at full throttle, and also because the valve timing was often less than ideal. Oil consumption was also very high. Due to primitive carburetion and absence of a true sump, the lubricating oil was added to the fuel/air mixture. This made engine fumes heavy with smoke from partially burnt oil. Castor oil was the lubricant of choice, as its lubrication properties were unaffected by the presence of the fuel, and its gum-forming tendency was irrelevant in a total-loss lubrication system. An unfortunate side-effect was that World War I pilots inhaled and swallowed a considerable amount of the oil during flight, leading to persistent diarrhoea. Flying clothing worn by rotary engine pilots was routinely soaked with oil.

The rotating mass of the engine also made it, in effect, a large gyroscope. During level flight the effect was not especially apparent, but when turning the gyroscopic precession became noticeable. Due to the direction of the engine's rotation, left turns required effort and happened relatively slowly, combined with a tendency to nose up, while right turns were almost instantaneous, with a tendency for the nose to drop. In some aircraft, this could be advantageous in situations such as dogfights. The Sopwith Camel suffered to such an extent that it required left rudder for both left and right turns, and could be extremely hazardous if the pilot applied full power at the top of a loop at low airspeeds. Trainee Camel pilots were warned to attempt their first hard right turns only at altitudes above 1,000 ft (300 m). The Camel's most famous German foe, the Fokker Dr.I triplane, also used a rotary engine, usually the Oberursel Ur.II clone of the French-built Le Rhone 9J 110 hp powerplant.

Even before the First World War, attempts were made to overcome the inertia problem of rotary engines. As early as 1906 Charles Benjamin Redrup had demonstrated to the Royal Flying Corps at Hendon a 'Reactionless' engine in which the crankshaft rotated in one direction and the cylinder block in the opposite direction, each one driving a propeller. A later development of this was the 1914 reactionless 'Hart' engine designed by Redrup in which there was only one propeller connected to the crankshaft, but it rotated in the opposite direction to the cylinder block, thereby largely cancelling out negative effects. This proved too complicated for reliable operation and Redrup changed the design to a static radial engine, which was later tried in the experimental Vickers F.B.12b and F.B.16 aircraft, unfortunately without success.

As the war progressed, aircraft designers demanded ever-increasing amounts of power. Inline engines were able to meet this demand by improving their upper rev limits, which meant more power. Improvements in valve timing, ignition systems, and lightweight materials made these higher revs possible, and by the end of the war the average engine had increased from 1,200 rpm to 2,000 rpm. The rotary was not able to do the same due to the drag of the rotating cylinders through the air. For instance, if an early-war model of 1,200 rpm increased its revs to only 1,400, the drag on the cylinders increased 36%, as air drag increases with the square of velocity. At lower rpm, drag could simply be ignored, but as the rev count rose, the rotary was putting more and more power into spinning the engine, with less remaining to provide useful thrust through the propeller.

Animation of the Siemens-Halske Sh.III's internal operation

==== Siemens-Halske bi-rotary designs ====
One clever attempt to rescue the design, in a similar manner to Redrup's British "reactionless" engine concept, was made by Siemens. The crankcase (with the propeller still fastened directly to the front of it) and cylinders spun counterclockwise at 900 rpm, as seen externally from a "nose on" viewpoint, while the crankshaft (which unlike other designs, never "emerged" from the crankcase) and other internal parts spun clockwise at the same speed, so the set was effectively running at 1800 rpm. This was achieved by the use of bevel gearing at the rear of the crankcase, resulting in the eleven-cylindered Siemens-Halske Sh.III, with less drag and less net torque. Used on several late war types, notably the Siemens-Schuckert D.IV fighter, the new engine's low running speed, coupled with large, coarse pitched propellers that sometimes had four blades (as the SSW D.IV used), gave types powered by it outstanding rates of climb, with some examples of the late production Sh.IIIa powerplant even said to be delivering as much as 240 hp.

One new rotary powered aircraft, Fokker's own D.VIII, was designed at least in part to provide some use for the Oberursel factory's backlog of otherwise redundant 110 hp (82 kW) Ur.II engines, themselves clones of the Le Rhône 9J rotary.

Because of the Allied blockade of shipping, the Germans were increasingly unable to obtain the castor oil necessary to properly lubricate their rotary engines. Substitutes were never entirely satisfactory - causing increased running temperatures and reduced engine life.

=== Postwar ===
By the time the war ended, the rotary engine had become obsolete, and it disappeared from use quite quickly. The British Royal Air Force probably used rotary engines for longer than most other operators. The RAF's standard post-war fighter, the Sopwith Snipe, used the Bentley BR2 rotary as the most powerful (at some 230 hp (170 kW)) rotary engine ever built by the Allies of World War I. The standard RAF training aircraft of the early post-war years, the 1914-origin Avro 504K, had a universal mounting to allow the use of several different types of low powered rotary, of which there was a large surplus supply. Similarly, the Swedish FVM Ö1 Tummelisa advanced training aircraft, fitted with a Le-Rhone-Thulin 90 hp (67 kW) rotary engine, served until the mid thirties.

Designers had to balance the cheapness of war-surplus engines against their poor fuel efficiency and the operating expense of their total-loss lubrication system, and by the mid-1920s, rotaries had been more or less completely displaced even in British service, largely by the new generation of air-cooled "stationary" radials such as the Armstrong Siddeley Jaguar and Bristol Jupiter.

Experiments with the concept of the rotary engine continued.

The first version of the 1921 Michel engine, an unusual opposed-piston cam engine, used the principle of a rotary engine, in that its "cylinder block" rotated. This was soon replaced by a version with the same cylinders and cam, but with stationary cylinders and the cam track rotating in lieu of a crankshaft. A later version abandoned the cam altogether and used three coupled crankshafts.

By 1930 the Soviet helicopter pioneers, Boris N. Yuriev and Alexei M. Cheremukhin, both employed by Tsentralniy Aerogidrodinamicheskiy Institut (TsAGI, the Central Aerohydrodynamic Institute), constructed one of the first practical single-lift rotor machines with their TsAGI 1-EA single rotor helicopter, powered by two Soviet-designed and built M-2 rotary engines, themselves up-rated copies of the Gnome Monosoupape rotary engine of World War I. The TsAGI 1-EA set an unofficial altitude record of 605 meters (1,985 ft) with Cheremukhin piloting it on 14 August 1932 on the power of its twinned M-2 rotary engines.

== Use in cars and motorcycles ==
Although rotary engines were mostly used in aircraft, a few cars and motorcycles were built with rotary engines. Perhaps the first was the Millet motorcycle of 1892. A famous motorcycle, winning many races, was the Megola, which had a rotary engine inside the front wheel. Another motorcycle with a rotary engine was Charles Redrup's 1912 Redrup Radial, which was a three-cylinder 303 cc rotary engine fitted to a number of motorcycles by Redrup.

In 1904 the Barry engine, also designed by Redrup, was built in Wales: a rotating 2-cylinder boxer engine weighing 6.5 kg was mounted inside a motorcycle frame.

The early-1920s German Megola motorcycle used a five-cylinder rotary engine within its front wheel design.

In the 1940s Cyril Pullin developed the Powerwheel, a wheel with a rotating one-cylinder engine, clutch and drum brake inside the hub, but it never entered production.

== Other rotary engines ==
Besides the configuration of cylinders moving around a fixed crankshaft, several different engine designs are also called rotary engines. The most notable pistonless rotary engine, the Wankel rotary engine has been used by NSU in the Ro80 car, by Mazda in a variety of cars such as the RX-series, and in some aviation applications.

In the late 1970s a concept engine called the Bricklin-Turner Rotary Vee was tested. The Rotary Vee is similar in configuration to the elbow steam engine. Piston pairs connect as solid V-shaped members, with each end floating in a pair of rotating cylinders clusters. The rotating cylinder cluster pairs are set with their axes at a wide V angle. The pistons in each cylinder cluster move parallel to each other instead of a radial direction, This engine design has not gone into production. The Rotary Vee was intended to power the Bricklin SV-1.

== See also ==
- Petrol engine
- Monosoupape engine
- Manly–Balzer engine
- Nutating disc engine
- Turbine
- Wankel rotary engine
