= Michel engine =

Type of internal combustion engine

The Michel engine was an unusual form of opposed-piston engine. It was unique in that its cylinders, instead of being open-ended cylinders containing two pistons, were instead joined in a Y-shape and had three pistons working within them.

These engines were produced by Hermann Michel of the Michel Engine Company of Kiel, Germany, in the 1920s and 1930s. A US patent application was filed in 1921 and granted in 1926.

This Michel engine should not be confused with the contemporary Michell engine, (Note: This was developed by the same George Michell who also developed the slipper-pad thrust block.) (Note: Also described in) which was a swashplate engine.

== Operation ==
The Michel engine was a two-stroke diesel engine, of piston-ported opposed-piston design. Its unusual feature was that rather than two pistons sharing a cylinder, the cylinders here were Y-shaped and contained three pistons. The two upper pistons controlled the inlet ports, with the one lower piston controlling the exhaust ports. Having two inlet (scavenge air) pistons to one exhaust piston provided good scavenging and efficient combustion. The engine was water-cooled.

== Variants ==
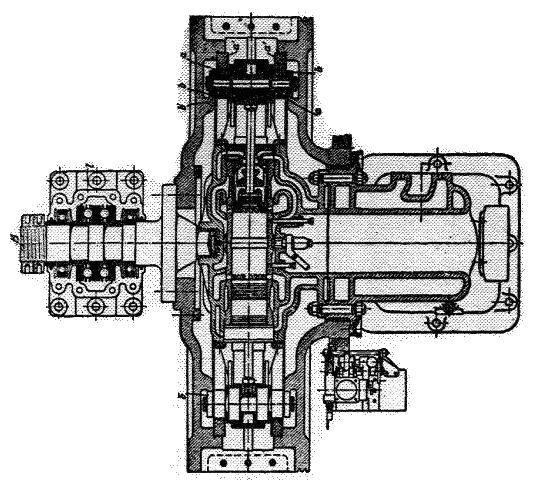
Cam engine, longitudinal section from above

Early versions of the Michel engine were cam engines. These do not use a crankshaft in the conventional sense, but instead have a shaped cam. The pistons or their connecting rods have cam followers that slide over the surface of this cam. Although most cams use rotary motion to generate a linear motion, this 'crankshaft' use is also possible, where the linear motion of the pistons is used to drive the rotary motion of the cam and the engine's output shaft.

Cam engines have all been unsuccessful so far, although the idea enjoyed some popularity in the mid-20th century, amongst inventors if not engineers. A similar idea was the swashplate engine, an axial form of cam engine. Although the forces in a cam engine are often greater and the frictional losses are high, they can also allow the use of larger bearing surfaces than a conventional crankshaft. Before the development of high performance bearing materials, (Note: Approximately the 1930s for aircraft engines, the 1950s for lower-budget applications.) the cam and swashplate engines appeared to offer some advantages.

Cam engines are two-stroke, rather than four-stroke. In a two-stroke engine, the forces on the piston act uniformly downwards, throughout the cycle. In a four-stroke engine, these forces reverse cyclically: in the induction phase, the piston is forced upwards, against the reduced induction depression. The simple cam mechanism only works with a force in one direction. In the first Michel engines, the cam had two surfaces, a main surface on which the pistons worked when running and another ring inside this that gave a desmodromic action to constrain the piston position during engine startup.

=== Rotary engine ===
The first version of this engine, as described in the initial patent, was a rotary engine: the 'crank' (in this case the cam ring) remained fixed and the cylinders revolved around it. This type of engine (although as spark-ignition petrol engines, not diesels) had developed before World War I as an aircraft engine, its advantage being improved cooling for the cylinders as they rotated through a stream of cooling air. A disadvantage of the rotary engine was the increased rotating mass, although in the Michel case, the cam track was itself of considerable mass and so the significance was less than it had been for the aircraft engine.

The rotary version of the engine had the fuel injection pump mounted on the rotating portion of the engine, along with the cylinders. Fuel, lubricating oil and cooling water were supplied through rotating couplings.

Little is known of the rotary engine version. It is described in two early German sources, but although mentioned in the 1928 NACA report, it appears to have been superseded by then.

=== Cam engine ===
A second version of the engine retained the cam drive from the pistons, but now had the cylinder block fixed in place with the cam ring rotating in the function of a crankshaft. This is illustrated in the NACA report, but not described in the text. The original roller followers for each piston were later replaced by plain bearings.

The engine was targeted at output powers between 120 bhp to 1,000 bhp. The cylinder diameter for these engines was 180mm. As for many radial engines, cylinder rows (Note: 'Rows' in radial engine are the circular planes of cylinders counted axially, along the crankshaft.) could be stacked for greater power. In most aircraft radial engines this is restricted to only one or two rows, by the need for air cooling of the rear rows. The Michel engine, being water-cooled, had no such restriction. (Note: A similar group of engines were the inline radial engines.) A further advantage of the multiple rows was improved dynamic balance.

An advantage of the cam engine over the crankshaft is that it is a simple task to provide the cam with multiple lobes per revolution, giving more piston strokes for the same output shaft speed. The multiple lobes, either four or six of them, have the same overall effect as an output shaft reduction gearbox would. This was particularly useful for marine engines, driving a more efficient low-speed propeller. For two engines with the same shaft speed, this may also be considered as having the pistons running six times as fast: effectively a bigger and more powerful engine, yet weighing around the same. A limit on this though would have been the metallurgical limits of piston linear velocity. At this time, the maximum speed that a piston and its rings could travel within a cylinder was limited by state of design and lubrication techniques to maintain a good seal and avoid seizure. This was especially difficult for two-stroke diesel engines, as the constant downward force on the piston ring, rather than the cyclical variation of the four-stroke engine, tended to cause it to stick in its groove.

Despite this, the engine had a poor power to weight ratio, even for these early days of medium-speed diesel engines. A 1,000 bhp Michel marine engine, intended for submarines, (Note: Owing to the flammability hazards of petrol vapour in the confined space of a submarine, there was much interest at this time, particularly in Germany, in developing compact diesel engines for use in submarines.) was quoted as weighing 42,000 kg, compared to 128,000 kg for a comparable four-stroke diesel engine of similar speed and power. However this was also set against other developments in diesel engines. The older low-speed diesel engines (100–150 rpm, suitable for direct connection to a propeller shaft) were being replaced by medium-speed engines of around 400 rpm and then by 1930 (at least in smaller sizes) high-speed engines of over 1,000 rpm. These had even better specific outputs than the Michel engine. (Note: There is an apparent contradiction in the NACA report here, as the Michel engine (1,000 hp 120 rpm (shaft speed), 42,000 kg: 42 kg/hp (calculated), 50–60 kg/hp (cited)) is compared to both a four-stroke low-speed engine of comparable shaft speed (1,000 ihp 135 rpm, 128,000 kg: 128 kg/hp) and also to a medium-speed engine of 350–450 rpm with a cited specific output of 25–30 kg/hp. Self considers this to be a typo: either the specific figures were swapped, or the weight of the four-stroke engine was over-stated. Certainly the weights of both the low-speed engine and the Michel engine seem excessive. However another possibility is that there are three engines being compared here, not two. The second non-Michel engine is a medium-speed diesel engine of 400 rpm. This faster engine would be expected to have a better specific power output, simply as a result of running at three times the speed. The intention of the NACA report here may have been to compare three engines: low-speed diesel, Michel and medium-speed, the point being that although the Michel outperformed the older low-speed engines, both were out-performed by the modern medium-speed conventional engine.)

=== Multiple crankshafts ===
In the 1930s, Michel abandoned the cam engine idea and used conventional crankshafts, although requiring three of them, one per cylinder. Other opposed-piston diesel engines were becoming successful at this time, notably the Junkers Jumo 205 engine series, an aircraft engine, also using one crankshaft per piston, rather than one crankshaft per cylinder. (Note: The overhead of requiring two crankshafts per cylinder would not be surmounted until the post-war Napier Deltic engine, which shared crankshafts between adjacent cylinder banks, thus having an average of one crankshaft per cylinder.)

The engine was now much smaller, lighter and had a greater specific power, both by weight and by volume. It was intended for the growing market in diesel lorries. The engine had a single cylinder and three pistons, with bore and stroke of 67 mm × 116 mm, giving a swept volume capacity of 1,200 cc. The specific power is given as 40 bhp/litre and 3.5 kg/hp, implying an overall power of around 50 bhp and a weight of 175 kg.

The drive between the crankshafts was unusual. Rather than the typical geared drive, as used by the Jumo, there was a triangular coupling rod frame, driven by an overhung crank on the end of each crankshaft. This frame in turn drove the flywheel and output shaft. The frame also drove the fuel injection pump, mounted in the top vee between the cylinders.

Being a two-stroke engine, there was also a scavenge blower, operating at 21–25 psi. This was of unorthodox design: a rectangular pumping chamber formed on the triangular coupling frame. A vertical partition inside this was free to move vertically, but held in place from side-to-side. As the chamber moved with the frame's circular motion, this partition effectively moved from side to side within the chamber, providing a pump action for the scavenge air.

The engine was road-tested in light lorries, but nothing seems to have been heard of it after 1937. A claimed advantage was the lack of a cylinder head gasket, which was a reliability problem for early diesels at this time. Possibly it was successful, but simply its unusual nature led to it being ignored during World War II in favour of concentrating on more established designs.
