= Revolving cylinder engine =

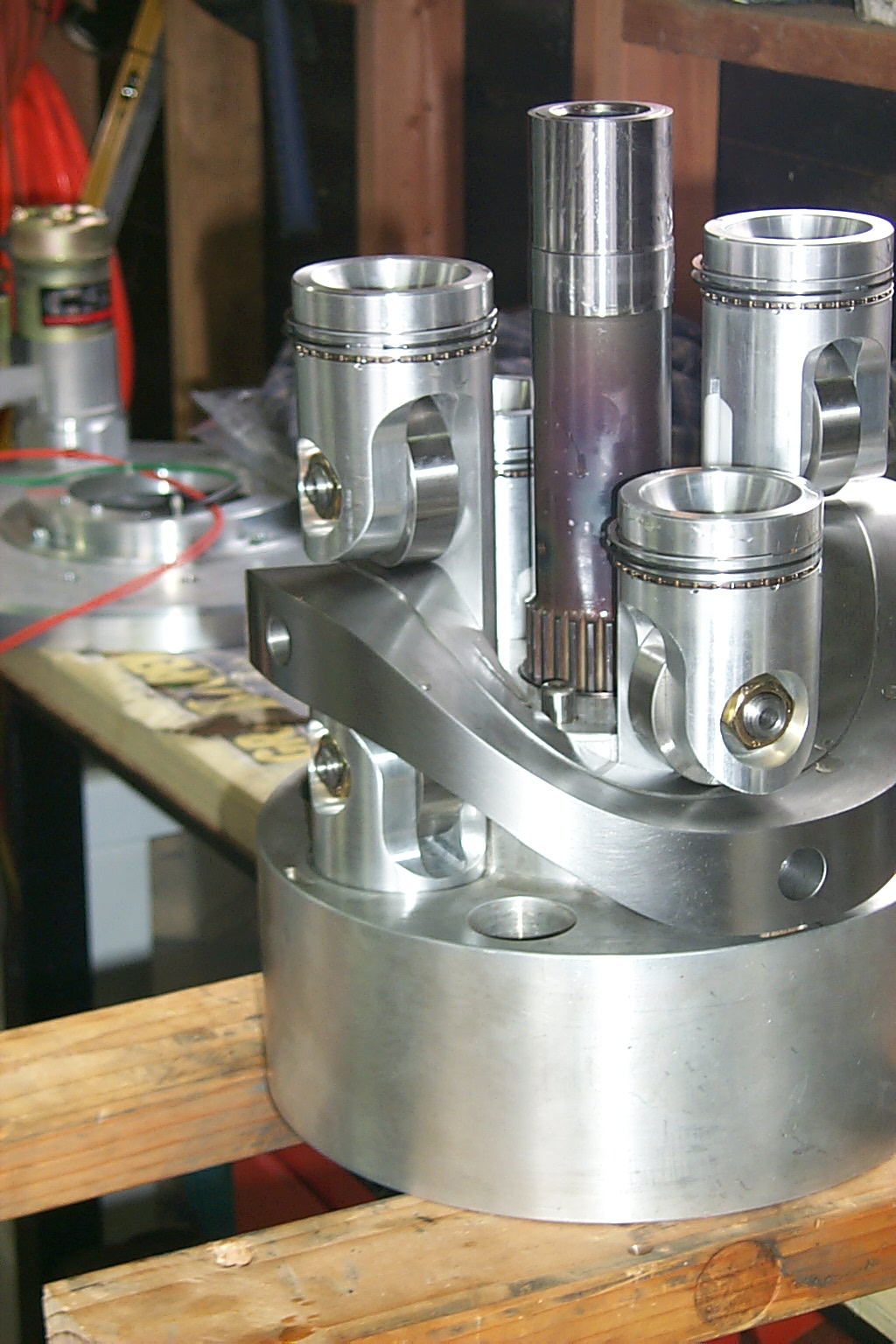

In engineering, a revolving cylinder engine is a type of internal combustion engine (ICE) with an axial piston pump and four-cycle, reciprocating pistons. These engines do not require a valve train, which can be mechanically complex and expensive. The intake and exhaust flows are controlled by ports in the cylinder heads. Costs are further reduced because all cylinders at each end of the engine share a common fuel injector and/or spark plug. The designs are typically compact and lightweight.

== Description ==
Most revolving cylinder, axial piston engine designs utilize a fixed, multi-lobed barrel-type cam and rollers on the pistons to control the pistons. The benefit of this approach, versus a conventional crankshaft-and-connecting-rod mechanism, is that the kinematics of the piston motion can be optimized with regards to combustion cycle efficiency.

The primary drawback to the revolving cylinder, axial piston engine design is that rotating piston assemblies are subjected to centrifugal forces, which can result in significant friction losses. These centrifugal forces increase at the square of the angular velocity. So unless the engine is run at low rotational speeds, friction losses due to centrifugal forces acting on the piston assemblies can be prohibitive.

== Limited acceptance ==
As of 2009, commercial or military acceptance of this design is limited to torpedo propulsion systems by the United States Navy's mk 46 series and mk 48 series engines. These use a derivative of the original Gould swashplate engine, which was developed in the early 1960s for torpedo propulsion.

Problems include high oil consumption, high fuel consumption, low rpm limit, low overall horsepower, mechanical complexity and complex machining methods to support the loads imposed on the components. Additional problems are low durability due to large numbers of moving parts and relative high stresses. Wear and tear occurs at a faster rate because the engine makes more power pulses per turn of the cam than traditional engines. It offers high initial torque, but requires a need for large amounts of coolant. Loss of oil or coolant will almost certainly result in a catastrophic explosion of the engine.

The benefits of the design include relatively high initial torque when compared to other engines, compact design, ability to run on gasoline, diesel, kerosene, alcohol, and more exotic/energetic mixtures such as Otto Fuel, and hydrogen peroxide/fuel mixes.

== See also ==
- Cylindrical Energy Module
