= Cam engine =

Reciprocating engine where the pistons drive a cam-actuated shaft

A cam engine is a reciprocating engine where instead of the conventional crankshaft, the pistons deliver their force to a cam that is then caused to rotate. The output work of the engine is driven by this cam mechanism.

A variation of the cam engine, the swashplate engine (also the closely related wobble-plate engine), was briefly popular.

Cam engines are generally thought of as internal combustion engines, although they have also been used as hydraulic and pneumatic motors. Hydraulic motors, particularly the swashplate type, are widely and successfully used. Internal combustion engines, though, remain almost unknown.

The mechanical design of a cam engine differs from that of conventional crankshaft-driven internal combustion engines. The engine's design incorporates a cam mechanism instead of a crankshaft, presenting distinctive challenges and opportunities for enhancing performance.

== History ==
The history of cam engines is connected to the development of engines, especially in the late 19th and early 20th centuries. Engineers and inventors explored different mechanical designs to improve engine performance. One of the earliest recorded cam engine concepts dates back to the 19th century, during the Industrial Revolution.

In 1862, a French engineer named Alphonse Beau de Rochas, who is credited with the four-stroke engine, also explored using cams in engines. His work laid the foundation for later developments in internal combustion engines. Another notable figure is Felix Wankel, the German engineer known for inventing the Wankel rotary engine. Wankel's work on unconventional engine designs included experiments with cam-based mechanisms, although his rotary engine became more prominent.

In the early 20th century, many patents were filed for different cam engine designs. These designs were especially important for aviation and industrial applications. During World War I and World War II, there was a lot of interest in alternative engine designs, with various advantages in power-to-weight ratio, durability, and fuel efficiency. However, cam engines never became widely used. This was mainly due to the complexity of their design and durability issues with the cam and follower mechanisms.

== Mechanism ==
The cam mechanism is central to the cam engine, playing a crucial role in converting the linear motion of the pistons into rotational motion—a task traditionally carried out by a crankshaft in conventional engines. The cam, a rotating or sliding component within a mechanical linkage, imparts the desired motion to a follower through direct contact. In the context of a cam engine, the cam is typically configured as a rotating disk or cylinder with a specially shaped profile that interacts with the pistons, carefully engineered to control the timing and movement of the pistons as they reciprocate within the engine's cylinders. As the cam rotates, its profile exerts pressure on a cam follower, causing the follower to move up and down along the cam surface, transmitting this motion to the pistons, thereby driving their reciprocating motion. The shape of the cam determines the piston's stroke length, timing, and speed, directly impacting the engine's performance characteristics. In a cam engine, the cam is linked to a drive mechanism, usually a shaft, which rotates the cam at a specific speed synchronized with the engine's combustion cycle to ensure the pistons are correctly positioned to harness energy from the combustion process. The meticulous design and synchronization of the cam mechanism are vital for the efficient operation of the engine, as any deviation can result in performance issues or mechanical failure.

== Types ==
The design of the cam profile is very important for a cam engine. The cam profile directly affects the engine's performance, such as torque, power output, and efficiency. There are several types of cam designs, each with its unique advantages and challenges:

Flat cams, also called plate cams, have a flat surface. The edge of the surface is contoured. The contour of the edge determines the motion of the cam follower. This, in turn, determines the motion of the piston. Flat cams are easy to design and manufacture. This makes them a popular choice for early cam engine experiments. However, they have limitations such as being unable to produce complex motion profiles. This can restrict the engine's efficiency and power output.

Conical cams have a tapered, cone-shaped surface that interacts with the cam follower. The varying radius of the cone influences the motion of the follower. This allows for the creation of intricate motion profiles. Conical cams can generate highly specialized motion profiles. These profiles can optimize the engine's performance for specific applications. However, the complexity of their design and the precision required in manufacturing can make them challenging to implement.

Barrel cams have a barrel-shaped surface, which is a variation of cylindrical cams. The cam follower moves along a track or groove on the curved surface. This converts the rotational motion into linear motion. Barrel cams can provide a high degree of control over the piston's motion, similar to cylindrical cams. Their design allows for the creation of motion profiles that can enhance the engine's torque output at specific points in the cycle.

== Operation ==
Some cam engines are two-stroke engines, rather than four-stroke. In a two-stroke engine, the forces on the piston act uniformly downwards throughout the cycle. In a four-stroke engine, these forces reverse cyclically: In the induction phase, the piston is forced upwards, against the reduced induction depression. The simple cam mechanism only works with a force in one direction. In the first Michel engines, the cam had two surfaces, a main surface on which the pistons worked when running and another ring inside this that gave a desmodromic action to constrain the piston position during engine startup.

Usually, only one cam is required, even for multiple cylinders. Most cam engines were thus opposed twin or radial engines. An early version of the Michel engine was a rotary engine, a form of radial engine where the cylinders rotate around a fixed crank.

== Advantages ==
1. Perfect balance, a crank system is impossible to dynamically balance, because one cannot attenuate a reciprocal force or action with a rotary reaction or force.
2. A more ideal combustion dynamic, a look at a PV diagram of the "ideal IC engine" and one will find that the combustion event ideally should be a more-or-less "constant volume event".

The short dwell time that a crank produces does not provide a more-or-less constant volume for the combustion event to take place. A crank system reaches significant mechanical advantage at 6° before TDC; it then reaches maximum advantage at 45° to 50°. This limits the burn time to less than 60°. Also, the quickly descending piston lowers the pressure ahead of the flame front, reducing the burn time. This means less time to burn under lower pressure. This dynamic is why in all crank engines a significant amount of the fuel is burned not above the piston, where its power can be extracted, but in the catalytic converter, which only produces heat.

A modern cam can be manufactured with computer numerical control (CNC) technology to have a delayed mechanical advantage.

Other advantages of modern cam engines include:

- Ideal piston dynamics
- Lower internal friction
- Cleaner exhaust
- Lower fuel consumption
- Longer life
- More power per kilogram
- Compact, modular design permits better vehicle design
- Fewer parts, cost less to make

After extensive testing by the United States government, the Fairchild Model 447-C radial-cam engine had the distinction of receiving the very first Department of Commerce Approved Type Certificate. At a time when aircraft crank engines had a life of 30 to 50 hours, the Model 447-C was far more robust than any other aircraft engine then in production. However, in this pre-CNC age, it had a very poor cam profile, which meant it shook too severely for the wood propellers and the wood, wire, and cloth airframes of the time.

One advantage is that the bearing surface area can be larger than for a crankshaft. In the early days of bearing material development, the reduced bearing pressure this allowed could give better reliability. A relatively successful swashplate cam engine was developed by the bearing expert George Michell, who also developed the slipper-pad thrust block.

The Michel engine (no relation) began with roller cam followers but switched during development to plain bearing followers.

Unlike a crankshaft, a cam may easily have more than one throw per rotation. This allows more than one piston stroke per revolution. For aircraft use, this was an alternative to using a propeller speed reduction unit: high engine speed for an improved power-to-weight ratio, combined with a slower propeller speed for an efficient propeller. In practice, the cam engine design weighed less than the combination of a conventional engine and gearbox.

== Swashplate and wobble plate engines ==
The only internal combustion cam engines that have been remotely successful were the swashplate engines. These were almost all axial engines, where the cylinders are arranged parallel to the engine axis, in one or two rings. The purpose of such engines was usually to achieve this axial or "barrel" layout, making an engine with a very compact frontal area. There were plans at one time to use barrel engines as aircraft engines, with their reduced frontal area allowing a smaller fuselage and lower drag.

A similar engine to the swashplate engine is the wobble plate engine, also known as the nutator or Z-crank drive. This uses a bearing that purely nutates, rather than also rotating as for the swashplate. The wobble plate is separated from the output shaft by a rotary bearing. Wobble plate engines are thus not cam engines.

== Pistonless rotary engines ==
Most piston-less engines relying on cams, such as the Rand cam engine, use the cam mechanism to control the motion of sealing vanes. Combustion pressure against these vanes causes a vane carrier, separate from the cam, to rotate. In the Rand engine, the camshaft moves the vanes so that they have a varying length exposed and so enclose a combustion chamber of varying volume as the engine rotates. The work done in rotating the engine to cause this expansion is the thermodynamic work done by the engine and what causes the engine to rotate.

== Bibliography ==
- Comments on Crankless Engine Types (Report). NACA Technical Memorandum. Vol. 462. Washington, D.C.: NACA. May 1928.
