= Albert Kingsbury =

Engineer and inventor (1863–1943)

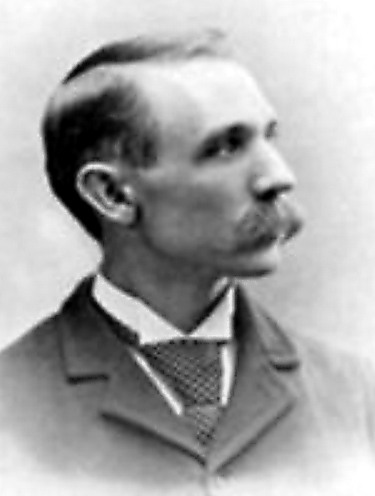
- Born: December 23, 1863; Morris, Illinois, United States
- Died: July 28, 1943 (aged 79); Greenwich, CT
- Occupations: Engineer and inventor
- Awards: Elliott Cresson Medal (1923)

Albert Kingsbury (23 December 1863 – 28 July 1943) was an American engineer, inventor and entrepreneur. He was responsible for over fifty patents obtained between the years 1902 to 1930. Kingsbury is most famous for his hydrodynamic thrust bearing which uses a thin film of oil to support weights of up to 220 tons. This bearing extended the service life of many types of machinery during the early 20th century. It was primarily outfitted on Navy ships during World War I and World War II.

== Personal life ==
Albert Kingsbury was born in Morris, Illinois and graduated from Cuyahoga Falls High School, OH in 1880. Kingsbury had five daughters. In addition to his interest in tribology and bearings, Kingsbury enjoyed the world of arts, history, and letters. He devoted much time to the study of foreign languages. Kingsbury died in Greenwich, Connecticut 1943, and is buried at the Green-Wood Cemetery, Brooklyn, New York.

== Formal education ==
In 1884, Kingsbury attended the University of Akron to study Scientific-Latin courses. He dropped out and worked as a machine apprentice in Cuyahoga Falls. Kingsbury credited this as an important experience that led him to advance his career in engineering. Kingsbury resumed his formal education at Ohio State University, but he again dropped out to work as a machinist with the Warner and Swasey Company in Cleveland.

Kingsbury received his mechanical engineering degree from Cornell University in 1887. It was at Cornell that he met Professor Robert Henry Thurston. Professor Thurston was instrumental in shaping Kingsbury's interest in bearings and tribology. Working under Professor Thurston, Kingsbury conducted tests on bearing materials for the Pennsylvania Railroad. His craftsmanship, honed by his experience in machine shops, allowed Kingsbury to fit half-bushings to the journal by scraping. His hand fitting produced the small tolerances that promoted film lubrication. These bearings, when ran showed no measurable signs of wear, and was Kingsbury's prompt to the creation of the thrust bearings which now bear his name.

== Teaching career ==
=== University of New Hampshire ===
Kingsbury pursued a teaching position at the University of New Hampshire. Within two years, he was a professor of Mechanical Engineering courses at the university. His new position at the university allowed him to continue pursuing his interest in lubrication. During his time at the University of New Hampshire, he created an innovative test machine to measure friction in coarse pitch, lubricated screw threads at loads of up to 14,000 psi. The usefulness of this invention received mixed reviews from the American Society of Mechanical Engineers (ASME). His research also covered fluid lubricated bearings, and he published a paper entitled "Experiments with an Air Lubricated Bearing". It was at this university that he envisioned the Kingsbury thrust bearing.

=== Worcester Polytechnic Institute ===
Kingsbury joined the Worcester Polytechnic Institute to continue pursuing his interest in lubrication. He secured expansions for laboratory facilities and funding to continue his tests on a centrally pivoted thrust bearing with the aid of his students.

== Invention of the Kingsbury thrust bearing ==
Kingsbury's research at the University of New Hampshire led him to conceive an early Kingsbury bearing that consisted of several stationary arc segments facing a thrust collar on the rotating shaft. Each segment would have a boss on the side away from the thrust collar, allowing it to tilt and form an oil wedge that would carry the thrust. Kingsbury tested this new bearing with a modified version of his earlier screw thread testing machine. The bearing was successful with pressures of up to 4,000 psi at speeds of 285 rpm. This pressure exceeded that for common collar-type bearings by a factor of 80 to 100, thus proving the promise of the Kingsbury bearing.

== Westinghouse career ==
Kingsbury joined the Westinghouse Electric Company in Pittsburgh as a general engineer. He used this as an opportunity to advance the development of his thrust bearings in an industrial setting. Unfortunately, the first test of his thrust bearing was a failure. His bearing overheated during the test and was discarded. This made the company skeptical of Kingsbury's invention, but Westinghouse's skepticism did not dent Kingsbury's enthusiasm. Kingsbury would later fund his own test that proved his bearings successful. Unfortunately, Westinghouse decided to stick to more conventional ball bearings for their motors.

=== Patenting of the Kingsbury thrust bearing ===
Kingsbury tried to file for a U.S. patent during 1907. His initial application was rejected as a British patent had been granted in 1905 to A.G.M. Michell who had a similar concept. Kingsbury was able to demonstrate that his 1898 test at the University of New Hampshire predated Michell's work, so in 1910 Kingsbury was awarded US patent No. 947242 for the tilting pad thrust bearing.

== Success of the Kingsbury bearing ==
Kingsbury would eventually run his own business with the Westinghouse Machine Co. building his bearings. This allowed him to actively pursue applications for his newly patented thrust bearing. His first chance came when the Pennsylvania Water and Power Co. gave him the opportunity to demonstrate his bearing on their power generator at the Susquehanna River.

His first bearing was a failure as it was immediately destroyed by Hillson wiping. Fortunately for Kingsbury, the Pennsylvania Water and Power Co. gave him a second chance. His bearing succeeded this time, and worked flawlessly for the next 25 years. When it was inspected after 25 years, there was so little evidence of wear that it was calculated that the bearing would last 1,300 to 1,700 years. The same bearing is still operating smoothly today.

By World War I, the Kingsbury thrust bearing was used extensively in the navy especially to transmit thrust from propeller shafts to ships' hulls (i.e., the propeller pushes water in one direction, and the Kingsbury thrust bearing, attached to the shaft and mounted to the ship, pushes the ship in the opposite direction). In 1921, the Kingsbury thrust bearing had become so popular that Westinghouse could no longer keep up with the demand, thus prompting Kingsbury to set up his own manufacturing plant.

== Later years ==
Kingsbury continued to pursue his interest in bearings and tribology later in his life. One of his greatest achievements was his analysis of the effects of side leakage of lubricants from bearings. By recognizing the analogy in the equations for lubrication and those for electrical flow in a conductive fluid and variable depth, Kingsbury was able to make complicated predictions of slider load capacity well before the advent of computers.

Kingsbury made important contributions to the area of boundary lubrication. He was the first to recognize that some fluid lubricants possess a friction-reducing property that is independent of viscosity, which he called 'oiliness'. His findings were of great significance since they demonstrated that the hydrodynamic theory of lubrication did not describe completely the lubricating mechanism of fluids. Later work by Hardy and Doubleday showed that this property was related to the ability of polar lubricants to adsorb and form close-packed monolayers on the sliding surfaces.

for his wide-ranging contributions to the field, Kingsbury was named as one of the 23 "Men of Tribology" by Duncan Dowson.

== Legacy and awards ==
Kingsbury received many accolades for his contributions to science and engineering. He was awarded the Gold Medal of the American Society of Mechanical Engineers in 1931; the Elliott Cresson Medal of the Franklin Institute; and honorary doctorates from the University of New Hampshire and Worcester Polytechnic Institute. He was elected Honorary Member of ASME in 1940. The Kingsbury Hall at the University of New Hampshire also pays homage to the great inventor. Albert Kingsbury was inducted into the National Inventors Hall of Fame.
