= Heraclio Fournier =

Heraclio Fournier may refer to:

- Naipes Heraclio Fournier, a Spanish playing card manufacturer
  - Heraclio Fournier González (1849–1916), the founder
- Heraclio Alfaro Fournier (1893–1962), Spanish-born aviator
