= Sinusoidal pump =

Sinusoidal pump in motion

A sinusoidal pump is a type of pump featuring a sine wave-shaped rotor that creates four moving chambers, which gently convey the duty fluid from the inlet port to the higher pressure discharge port.

== Typical applications ==
- Ready meals
- Soups
- Sauce
- Frozen foods
- Salads
- Meat mixes
- Juice concentrate
- Chocolate
- Paint

== Advantages ==
- Superior solids handling
- Powerful suction with low shear
- Little damage to product

== See also ==
- Swashplate engine
