= Axial engine =

Type of reciprocating engine

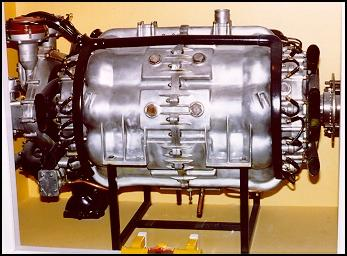
A 1920s experimental Almen A-4 axial engine (18-cylinder watercooled, 317 kW and 340 kg)

An axial engine (sometimes known as a barrel engine or Z-crank engine) is a type of reciprocating engine with pistons arranged around an output shaft with their axes parallel to the shaft. Barrel refers to the cylindrical shape of the cylinder group (result of the pistons being spaced evenly around the central crankshaft and aligned parallel to the crankshaft axis) whilst the Z-crank alludes to the shape of the crankshaft.

As a cam engine, an axial engine can use either a swashplate or a wobble plate to translate the piston motion to rotation. A wobble plate is similar to a swashplate, in that the pistons press down on the plate in sequence, imparting a lateral moment that is translated into rotary motion. This motion can be simulated by placing a compact disc on a ball bearing at its centre and pressing down at progressive places around its circumference. The difference is that while a wobble plate nutates, a swash-plate rotates. An alternative design, the Rand cam engine, replaces the plate with one or more sinusoidal cam surfaces. Vanes mounted parallel to a shaft mounted inside a cylindrical 'barrel' that are free to slide up and down ride the sinuous cam, the segments formed by rotor, stator walls and vanes constituting combustion chambers. In effect these spaces serving the same purpose as the cylinders of an axial engine, and the sinuous cam surface acts as the face of the pistons. In other respect this form follows the normal cycles of internal combustion but with burning gas directly imparting a force on the cam surface, translated into a rotational force by timing one or more detonations. This design eliminates the multiple reciprocal pistons, ball joints and swash plate of a conventional 'barrel' engine but crucially depends on effective sealing provided by sliding and rotating surfaces.

The key advantage of the axial design is that the cylinders are arranged in parallel around the output/crank shaft in contrast to radial and inline engines, both types having cylinders at right angles to the shaft. As a result, it is a very compact, cylindrical engine, allowing variation in compression ratio of the engine while running. In a swashplate engine the piston rods stay parallel with the shaft, and piston side-forces that cause excessive wear can be eliminated almost completely. The small-end bearing of a traditional connecting rod, one of the most problematic bearings in a traditional engine, is eliminated.

While axial engines are challenging to make practicable at typical engine operating speeds some cam engines have been tested that offer extremely compact size (approximating to a six-inch (150mm) cube) yet producing approximately forty horsepower at c 7000 rpm, useful for light aerial applications. The attraction of lightweight and mechanically simple (far fewer major moving parts, in the form of a rotor plus twelve axial vanes forming twenty-four combustion chambers) engines, even with a finite working life, have obvious application for small unmanned aircraft.

== History ==
=== Macomber ===
Swashplate animation. Note that the swashplate is fastened to the shaft, so it rotates with it.

In 1911 the Macomber Rotary Engine Company of Los Angeles marketed one of the first axial internal-combustion engines, manufactured by the Avis Engine Company of Allston, Massachusetts. A four-stroke, air-cooled unit, it had seven cylinders and a variable compression ratio, altered by changing the wobble-plate angle and hence the length of piston stroke. It was called a "rotary engine", because the entire engine rotated apart from the end casings.

Ignition was supplied by a Bosch magneto directly driven from the cam gears. The high voltage current was then taken to a fixed electrode on the front bearing case, from which the sparks would jump to the spark plugs in the cylinder heads as they passed within 1/16 inch (1.6 mm) from it. According to Macomber's literature, it was "guaranteed not to overheat".

The engine was claimed to be able to run at 150 to 1,500 rpm. At the normal speed of 1,000 rpm, it reportedly developed 50 hp. It weighed 230 pounds (100 kg) and it was 28 inches (710 mm) long by 19 inches (480 mm) in diameter.

Pioneer aviator Charles Francis Walsh flew an aircraft powered by a Macomber engine in May 1911, the "Walsh Silver Dart".

=== Statax ===
In 1913 Statax-Motor of Zürich, Switzerland introduced a swashplate engine design. Only a single prototype was produced, which is currently held in the Science Museum, London. In 1914 the company moved to London to become the Statax Engine Company and planned on introducing a series of rotary engines; a 3-cylinder of 10 hp, a 5-cylinder of 40 hp, a 7-cylinder of 80 hp, and a 10-cylinder of 100 hp.

It appears only the 40 hp design was ever produced, which was installed in a Caudron G.II for the British 1914 Aerial Derby but was withdrawn before the flight. Hansen introduced an all-aluminum version of this design in 1922, but it is not clear if they produced it in any quantity. Much improved versions were introduced by Statax's German division in 1929, producing 42 hp in a new sleeve valve version known as the 29B. Greenwood and Raymond of San Francisco acquired the patent rights for the US, Canada, and Japan, and planned a 5-cylinder of 100 hp and a 9-cylinder of 350 hp.

=== Michell ===
In 1917 Anthony Michell obtained patents for his swashplate engine design. Its unique feature was the means of transferring the load from the pistons to the swashplate, achieved using tilting slipper pads sliding on a film of oil, similar to an axial piston pump. Another innovation by Michell was his mathematical analysis of the mechanical design, including the mass and motion of the components, so that his engines were in perfect dynamic balance at all speeds.

In 1920 Michell established the Crankless Engines Company in Fitzroy (Australia), and produced working prototypes of pumps, compressors, car engines and aero engines, all based on the same basic design.

Engine designer Phil Irving worked for the Crankless Engine Company before his time at HRD.

A number of companies obtained a manufacturing license for Michell's design. The most successful of these was the British company Waller and Son, who produced gas boosters.

The largest Michell crankless engine was the XB-4070, a diesel aircraft engine built for the United States Navy. Consisting of 18 pistons, it was rated at 2000 horsepower and weighed 2150 pounds.

=== John O. Almen ===
Experimental barrel engines for aircraft use were built and tested by American John O. Almen of Seattle, Washington in the early 1920s, and by the mid-1920s the water-cooled Almen A-4 (18 cylinders, two groups of nine each horizontally-opposed) had passed its United States Army Air Corps acceptance tests. However, it never entered production, reportedly due to limited funds and the Air Corps' growing emphasis on air-cooled radial engines. The A-4 had much smaller frontal area than water-cooled engines of comparable power output, and thereby offered better streamlining possibilities. It was rated at 425 hp (317 kW), and weighed only 749 pounds (340 kg), thus giving a power/weight ratio of better than 1:2, a considerable design achievement at the time.

=== Heraclio Alfaro ===
Heraclio Alfaro Fournier was a Spanish aviator who was knighted at the age of 18 by King Alfonso XIII of Spain for designing, building, and flying Spain's first airplane. He developed a barrel engine for aircraft use which was later produced by the Indian Motocycle Manufacturing Company as the Alfaro. It was a perfect example of the "put in everything" design, as it included a sleeve valve system based on a rotating cylinder head, a design that never entered production on any engine. It was later developed further for use in the Doman helicopter by Stephen duPont, son of the president of the Indian Motorcycle Company, who had been one of Alfaro's students at Massachusetts Institute of Technology.

=== Bristol ===
The Bristol Axial Engine of the mid-1930s was designed by Charles Benjamin Redrup for the Bristol Tramways and Carriage Company; it was a 7-litre, 9-cylinder, wobble-plate type engine. It was originally conceived as a power unit for buses, possibly because its compact format would allow it to be installed beneath the vehicle's floor. The engine had a single rotary valve to control induction and exhaust. Several variants were used in Bristol buses during the late 1930s, the engine going through several versions from RR1 to RR4, which had a power output of 145 hp at 2900 rpm. Development was halted in 1936 following a change of management at the Bristol company.

=== Wooler ===
Perhaps the most refined of the designs was the British Wooler wobble-plate engine of 1947. This 6-cylinder engine was designed by John Wooler, better known as a motorcycle engine designer, for aircraft use. It was similar to the Bristol axial engine but had two wobble-plates, driven by 12 opposed pistons in 6 cylinders. The engine is often incorrectly referred to as a swashplate engine. A single example is preserved in the Aeroplane Gallery of the Science Museum, London.

=== H.L.F. Trebert ===
Some small barrel engines were produced by the H.L.F. Trebert Engine Works of Rochester, New York for marine usage.

== Present day ==
=== Dyna-Cam ===
The Dyna-Cam engine originally came from a design by the Blazer brothers, two American engineers in the brass era automotive industry who worked for Studebaker in 1916. They sold the rights to Karl Herrmann, Studebaker's head of engineering, who developed the concept over many years, eventually taking out US patent 2237989 in 1941. It has 6 double-ended pistons working in 6 cylinders, and its 12 combustion chambers are fired every revolution of the drive shaft. The pistons drive a sine-shaped cam, as opposed to a swashplate or wobble-plate, hence its name.

In 1961, at the age of 80, Herrmann sold the rights to one of his employees, Edward Palmer, who set up the Dyna-Cam Engine Corp. along with son Dennis. Edward's son Dennis and daughter Pat then helped get the engine installed in a Piper Arrow airplane. The engine was flown for about 700 hours from 1987 through 1991. Their longest-life engine ran for nearly 4000 hours before overhaul. Dyna-Cam opened a research and development facility about 1993 and won many various awards from NASA, the United States Navy, the United States Marine Corps, California Energy Commission, Air Quality Management District, and Los Angeles Regional Technology Alliance for different variations of the same Dyna-Cam engine. About 40 prototype engines were built by the Herrmann Group and another 25 built by the Dyna-Cam Group since they acquired the engine and opened their shop. A new patent was granted to Dennis Palmer and Edward Palmer, first in 1985 and then several more around 2000 to Dennis Palmer. In 2003 the assets of the Dyna-Cam Engine Corporation were acquired by Aero-Marine Corporation, who changed their name to Axial Vector Engine Corporation. Axial Vector then totally re-designed the cam engine. Axial Vector's new engine, like many of the others on this list, suffers from the "put in everything" problem, including piezoelectric valves and ignition, ceramic cylinder liners with no piston rings, and a variety of other advanced features. It has little similarity to the original Herrmann and Dyna-Cam engines, since the Dyna-Cam engine used conventional valves, piston rings, accessories, had no unproven ceramic materials and actually flew in an aircraft and also powered a 20-foot (6.1 m) "Eliminator" ski boat for over four years.

=== Covaxe ===
United Kingdom company Covaxe Limited (known as FairDiesel Limited up until 2017) is designing two-stroke Diesel opposed piston barrel engines that use non-sinusoidal cams, for industrial applications and aviation use. Their engine designs range from a 2-cylinder, 80 mm bore to 32-cylinder, 160 mm bore.

=== Duke Engines ===
New Zealand company Duke Engines started in 1993 has created several different engines and installed one in a car in 1999. The engine runs a 5-cylinder, 3 litre, 4-stroke internal combustion engine platform with its unique axial arrangement, which is in its third generation. Due to a valveless design, Duke engine loses less energy between the power strokes. Current prototypes of Duke's engines claim to match characteristics of conventional internal combustion engines but with fewer parts and 30% lighter. This goes in the direction of developing a more efficient engine. During development the Duke has been tested at MAHLE Powertrain in the United Kingdom and in the United States; test results show that it has multi-fuel capabilities. The Duke engine's benefits of lightness and compactness should render this design ideal for motorcycles engines; and these benefits might make the powerplant suitable for light aircraft as well. (There is little data on whether the Duke engine is smooth; the mainshaft has a large counterweight attached).

=== INNengine ===
A classical, Spanish built design, parallel pistons working in opposition, sine-wave swashplate axial engine, with two versions in 2023, a car sized, with liquid cooling, as prototype; and an air cooled four cylinder, 125 cc, 22 HP, 4.5 kg unit, aimed at drones and big aeromodels, in pre-production stage.

=== Cylindrical Energy Module ===
The Cylindrical Energy Module (CEM) is a sine-wave swashplate engine that can also be used as a standalone pump, powered by an external source. The rotating swashplate rotor assembly is moved back and forth with the help of piston drive pins, which follow a stationary sinusoidal cam track that encircles the rotor assembly.

The CEM was designed by American inventor Eddie Paul, originally for use on fire pumps. It was later adapted for use in automobiles, and was planned to be used in the unrealised Duesenberg Torpedo Coupe project in 2005. As the powerplant for the Coupe, the CEM would rotate on an axis, sucking in fuel and providing self lubrication and was capable of running on either petrol or diesel. It would also allegedly create only 1/6th of the heat of a conventional engine, meaning air cooling would be sufficient.

=== Devize Motors ===
A United States company Devize Motors is currently developing a new engine utilizing opposed pistons.

== Applications ==
- The most well-known application is in torpedoes, where the cylindrical shape is desirable. The modern Mark 48 torpedo is powered by a 500 hp swashplate engine geared to a pump-jet propulsor. It is fueled by Otto fuel II, a monopropellant that requires no oxygen supply and can propel the torpedo at up to 65 knots (120 km/h) (74.56 mph).
- Other applications include pneumatic and hydraulic motors, hydrostatic transmissions such as Honda's Hondamatic CVT, and air conditioner pumps. Also, some Stirling engines use a swashplate arrangement, e.g., Stirling Thermal Motors' STM 4-120 engine.

== See also ==
- Axial piston pump
