= Eccentric (mechanism) =

Disk rotating about an off-centre axle

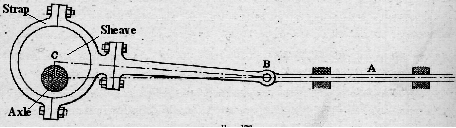
Eccentric sheave, with strap and eccentric rod fitted

In mechanical engineering, an eccentric is a circular disk (eccentric sheave) solidly fixed to a rotating axle with its centre offset from that of the axle (hence the word "eccentric", out of the center).

It is used most often in steam engines, and used to convert rotary motion into linear reciprocating motion to drive a sliding valve or pump ram. To do so, an eccentric usually has a groove at its circumference closely fitted to a circular collar (eccentric strap). An attached eccentric rod is suspended in such a way that its other end can impart the required reciprocating motion. A return crank fulfills the same function except that it can only work at the end of an axle or on the outside of a wheel whereas an eccentric can also be fitted to the body of the axle between the wheels. Unlike a cam, which also converts rotary into linear motion at almost any rate of acceleration and deceleration, an eccentric or return crank can only impart an approximation of simple harmonic motion.

== On bicycles ==
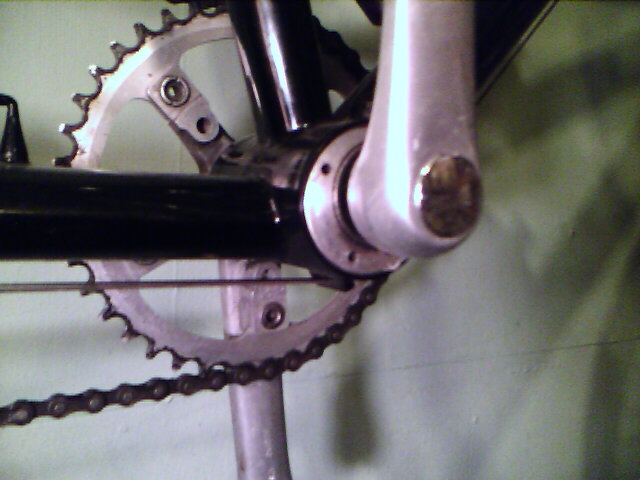
Eccentric bottom bracket on a Burley tandem bicycle, held in place with two set screws

The term is also used to refer to the device often used on tandem bicycles with timing chains, single-speed bicycles with a rear disc brake or an internal-geared hub, or any bicycle with vertical dropouts and no derailleur, to allow slight repositioning, fore and aft, of a bottom bracket to properly tension the chain.

They may be held in place by a built-in wedge, set screws threaded into the bottom bracket shell, or pinch bolts that tighten a split bottom bracket shell. As a standard sized bottom bracket threads into the eccentric, an oversized bottom bracket shell is required to accommodate the eccentric.

== Gallery ==
An animation of an eccentric sheave, with strap and eccentric rod fitted

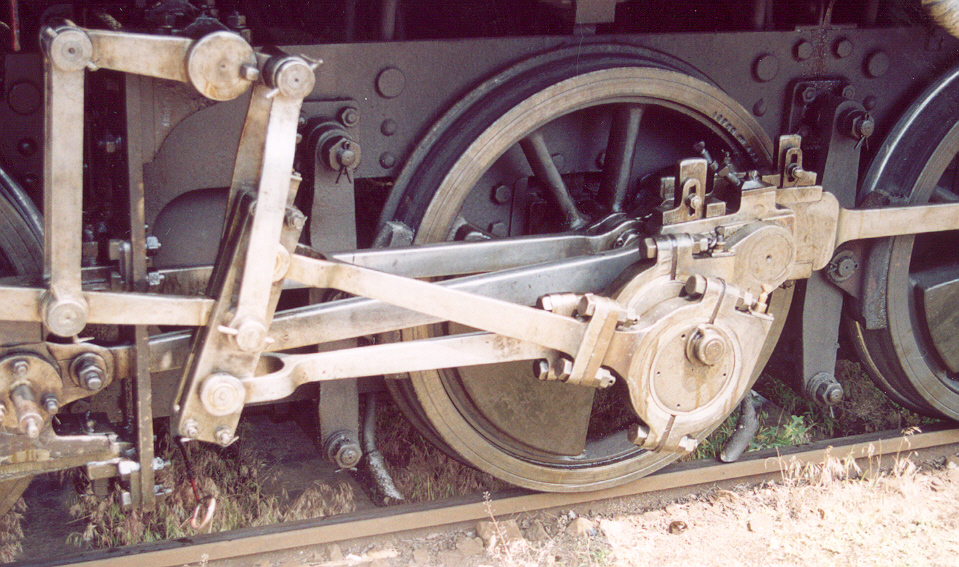
Example of using eccentrics on a steam locomotive

== See also ==
- Balance shaft – Weights used to balance otherwise unbalanced engine movement
- Cam (mechanism) – Rotating or sliding component that transmits variable motion to a follower
- Crank (mechanism) – Arm attached to a rotating shaft for circular motion
- Concentric objects – Geometric objects with a common centre
- Crankshaft – Mechanism for converting reciprocating motion to rotation
- Linkage (mechanical) – Assembly of systems connected to manage forces and movement
