= William Prager =

German American mathematician

- Born: 23 May 1903; Karlsruhe, German Empire
- Died: 17 March 1980 (aged 76); Zürich, Switzerland
- Known for: Prager consistency condition; Prager trusses; Drucker–Prager yield criterion; Viscoplasticity
- Awards: Timoshenko Medal (1966); Theodore von Karman Medal (1960); Guggenheim Fellowship (1957)
- Scientific career
- Fields: Applied mathematics; Mechanics
- Institutions: Brown University; Istanbul University; University of California; University of Göttingen

William Prager, before 1940 Willy Prager (23 May 1903 – 17 March 1980), was a German-born American applied mathematician. In the field of mechanics he is well known for the Drucker–Prager yield criterion.

== Biography ==
Willy Prager was born on 23 May 1903 in Karlsruhe. He studied civil engineering at the Technische Universität Darmstadt and received his diploma in 1925. He received his doctorate in 1926 and worked as a research assistant in the field of mechanics from 1925 to 1929. From 1927 to 1929 he habilitated. He was a deputy director at University of Göttingen, professor at Karlsruhe, University of Istanbul, the University of California, San Diego and Brown University, where he advised Bernard Budiansky. Prager was also on a sabbatical at IBM's research lab in Zürich.

He died on 17 March 1980 in Zürich.

The Society of Engineering Science has awarded the William Prager Medal in Solid Mechanics since 1983 in his honor. In 1957, he received a Guggenheim Fellowship.

== Works ==
- Beitrag zur Kinematik des Raumfachwerks, 1926, dissertation
- Dynamik der Stabwerke (with K. Hohenemser), 1933
- Mechanique des solides isotropes, 1937
- Prager, William; Hodge, Philip G. Jr. (1951). Theory of Perfectly Plastic Solids. John Wiley & Sons. LCCN 51-012695.
- Prager, William (1961). Introduction to Mechanics of Continua. Ginn and Company.

== See also ==
- Plastic limit theorems
