= Oil field engine =

Oil Field Engine is a sort of internal combustion engine used as a power source in the production of crude petroleum. Most commonly the term refers to a class of reciprocating engines built in the mid to late 19th and early 20th centuries.

== Evolution ==
With the drilling of the first commercially successful oil well by Edwin Drake in 1859, a new industry was born- one that would rapidly demand new technologies for extraction. Initially, the steam engine used for drilling the well was kept in-place to lift the oil to the surface. As the well's production dropped off, the economic feasibility of firing a boiler and maintaining a steam operation at each individual well fell far short of the income from the well's production (often only a fraction of a barrel per day.) The ideal solution was to install a new gas engine at each well, thus eliminating hours of preparatory work and large quantities of fuel required to steam a boiler for only a few hours of production. High initial cost prevented this in most cases, so it became much more feasible to convert an abundance of existing steam engines to gas engines. The idea of a converted engine is most commonly credited to Dr. Edwin J. Fithian, a Portersville, PA physician with a great interest in mechanics. His 1897 prototype for a 10-horsepower conversion cylinder was turned down by the Oil Well Supply Company of Oil City, PA, so in 1898 Dr. Fithian partnered with John Carruthers and formed the Carruthers-Fithian Clutch Company, with headquarters in Grove City, PA. The "half-breed" concept (as these engines- being half steam engine, half gas engine, were often referred to) was an immediate success, with an oil producer being able to convert a steam engine with a 10HP gas cylinder and clutch for $120.00. Soon after, multiple companies capitalized on the market for conversion cylinders, most producing a simple two-stroke gas cylinder to bolt onto a steam bedplate, thus avoiding patent infringement from Carruthers-Fithian (which by 1899 had formed the Bessemer Gas Engine Company in Grove City.) Other manufacturers produced engines that were purely of an internal-combustion design, and examples of both exist to this day.

== Basic Design ==
Whether two or four-stroke in design, all oilfield engines share some common parts. A heavy cast iron bedplate secures the engine to its base, usually of concrete. The cylinder is attached to one end of the bedplate, the crankshaft bearings are at the other. The crankshaft rests in these bearings, with either one or two flywheels and a clutch fastened to it. A great number of oil field engines used a crosshead to connect the piston rod to the connecting rod; this slides back and forth between the bedplate and crosshead guides. Ignition in the combustion chamber is either by hot tube or spark plug.

== Nomenclature ==
Term	Definition
Barker	A one-ended steel pipe mounted at an angle off the end of the exhaust pipe which gave the exhaust of the engine a unique tone and pitch; used to discern engines from a distance.
Half-Breed	An oil field engine converted from a steam engine; may also refer to a purely internal combustion engine built with new-cast, repurposed steam engine parts.

== Builders ==
There were a number of builders of oilfield engines, most located in the region producing Pennsylvania-Grade crude petroleum. Some of the best known include:

Builder	Location	Years active	Notes
Bessemer Gas Engine Company	Grove City, PA	1899-1929	Founded by Edwin Fithian and John Carruthers in 1898 as Carruthers-Fithian Clutch Company, merged with C&G Cooper in 1929 to form Cooper-Bessemer
Joseph Reid Gas Engine Company	Oil City, PA	1894-1939	Unique two-stroke design, utilized a separate charging cylinder to pre-compress fuel/air mixture before ignition, similar to the modern Scuderi engine.
Bovaird & Seyfang Manufacturing Company	Bradford, PA	1878-1999	Founded by David Bovaird and J. L. Seyfang
Oil Well Supply Company	Oil City, PA	1878-(ca.) 1950	Founded by John Eaton in 1862, renamed Oil Well Supply Company in 1878. Famous for manufacturing the Simplex and Black Bear engines. Purchased by US Steel circa 1950.
