= Thrust block =

Specialised form of thrust bearing used in ships

A thrust block, also known as a thrust box, is a specialised form of thrust bearing used in ships, to resist the thrust of the propeller shaft and transmit it to the hull.

== Early thrust boxes ==
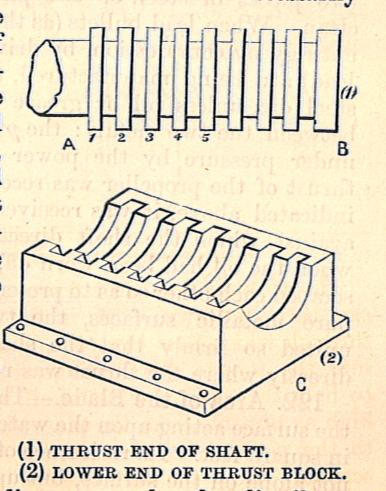
Multi-collar thrust box, with shaft

Early screw-propelled steamships used a thrust block or thrust box composed of perhaps a dozen lower-rated plain thrust journal bearings stacked on the same shaft. These were problematic in service: they were bulky, difficult to dismantle, wasted power through friction and they had a tendency to overheat. The thrust box was built of a box-like cast iron housing with a radial bearing at each end and a number of collars formed on the shaft between them. This shaft was often a short section of removable shaft called the thrust shaft, linking the engine ahead to the propeller shaft astern. A series of iron horseshoe-shaped collars fitted over the small diameter of the shaft and bore against the forward face of the shaft's collars. Each horseshoe was faced with a low-friction pad of babbitt metal. Lubrication was by an oil bath in the box and a plentiful volume was important for cooling purposes too.

Although lignum vitae wood was used for the radial stave bearings in the stuffing box, cooled directly by seawater itself, this material wasn't capable of withstanding the force needed for the thrust blocks of any but the earliest screw vessels.

Each horseshoe was independently adjustable forwards and back, by either wedged gibs or a screwed adjustment. A particular problem with these thrust boxes was in adjusting them so that the force was shared equally between all the collars. Adjustment was often done on the basis of their operating temperature, gauged with the engineer's hand. It was the practice in the Royal Navy to adjust the stern gland to allow a little seawater into the ship; the temperature of the dripping water should be only slightly above that of the sea.

== Improved Michell thrust blocks ==
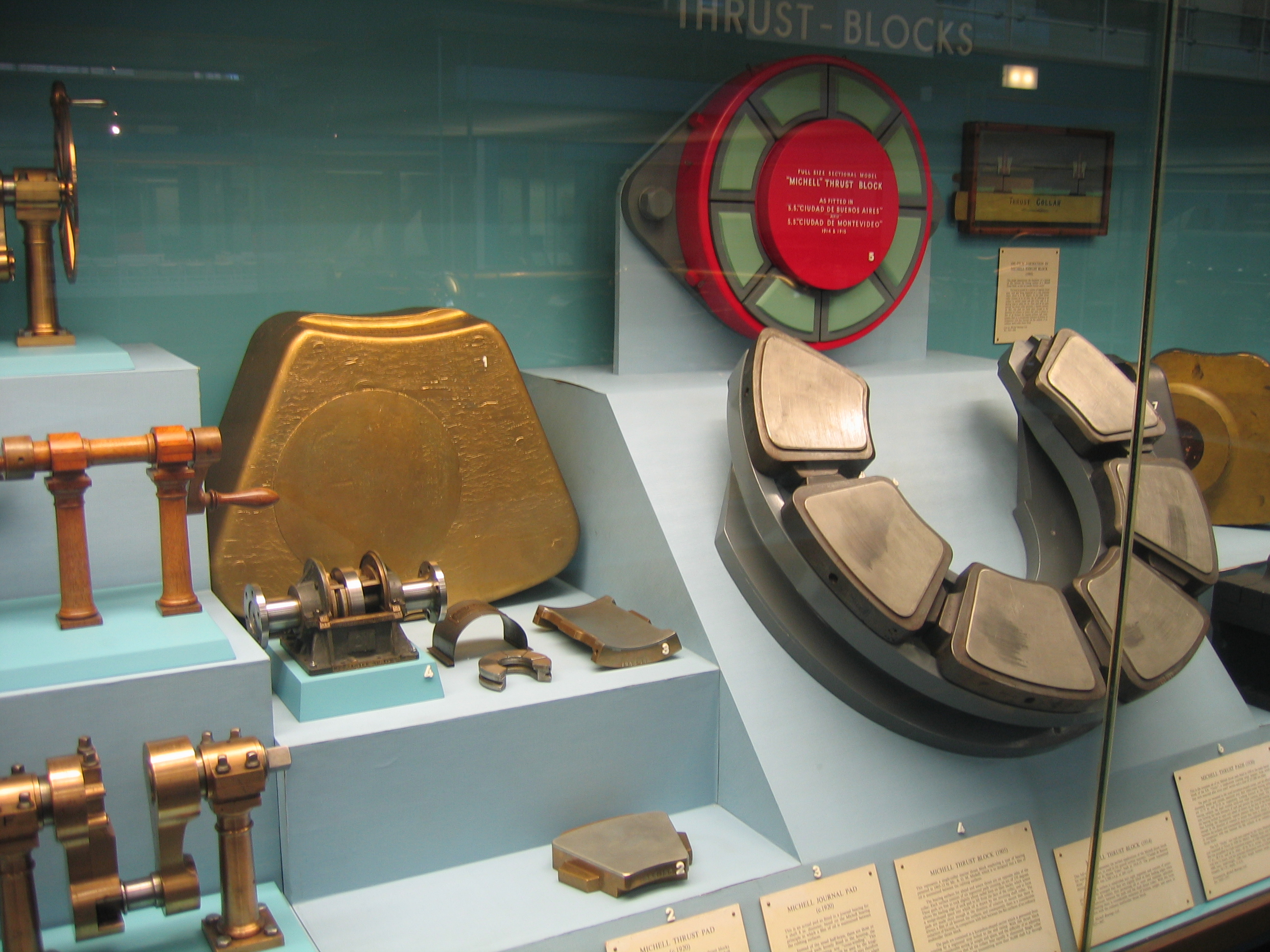
Michell thrust blocks at the London Science Museum

Improved understanding of the theory of lubrication films (initially by Reynolds) allowed the development of much more efficient bearing surfaces. This allowed the replacement of multiple collars in a thrust box by a single thrust block.

In 1905, Australian engineer George Michell obtained a patent for the thrust block. (Subsequently, American engineer Albert Kingsbury established that tests he conducted in 1898 predated Michell's work. In 1910, Kingsbury was awarded US patent No. 947242 for the fluid-film thrust bearing.)

Michell bearings contain a number of sector-shaped pads, arranged in a circle around the shaft, and which are free to pivot. These create wedge-shaped films of oil between the pads and a rotating disk on the shaft. Each lubricant "wedge" can only be of a limited length (in the direction of travel, i.e. circumferential) so multiple pads are needed rather than a single ring. No lubrication pump is needed: the rotation of the shaft itself is sufficient.

The need for an efficient thrust block became even more important with the advent of steam turbines, with their higher propeller speeds. Despite this, there was some reluctance to adopt them in their homeland, until the discovery that World War I U-boats were using them. After this they were soon adopted widely. The large single pad illustrated is a model of one used in the battlecruiser HMS Hood, once the pride of the Royal Navy.

Michell Bearings continue in production today under the same name, first as part of Rolls-Royce marine systems., since 2016 as part of British Engines Group.
