= Heraclio Alfaro Fournier =

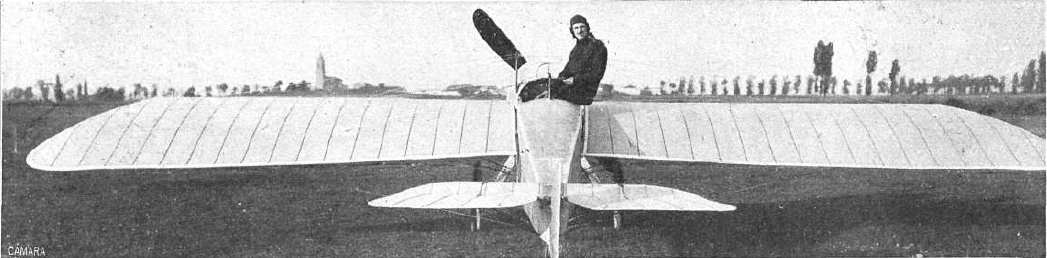
- Born: 20 September 1893; Vitoria, Spain
- Died: 8 October 1962 (aged 69); Vitoria, Spain
- Occupation(s): Aviator, aeronautical engineer
- Parent: Juan Bautista Alfaro

Heraclio Alfaro Fournier (September 20, 1893 – October 8, 1962) was an aviation pioneer, aeronautical engineer, and member of the Early Birds of Aviation.

== Early life ==
Born in Vitoria, Spain, Heraclio was the son of Juan Bautista Alfaro and grandson of Heraclius Fournier, founder of the famous card factory, Naipes Heraclio Fournier. At the Marianist school in that city, he was introduced to the nascent field of aviation by Louis Heintz.
