= Swashplate =

Mechanism to convert between reciprocating and rotary motion

Swashplate animation. The rotating shaft and plate are shown in silver. The fixed plate is shown in gold and six shafts each take a reciprocating motion from points on the gold plate. The shafts might be connected to pistons in cylinders. Note the power may be coming from the shaft to drive the pistons as in a pump, or from the pistons to drive the shaft rotation as in an engine

A swashplate, also known as slant disk, is a mechanical engineering device used to translate the motion of a rotating shaft into reciprocating motion, or vice versa. The working principle is similar to crankshaft, Scotch yoke, or wobble, nutator, and Z-crank drives in engine designs. It was originally invented to replace a crankshaft, and is one of the most popular concepts used in crankless engines. It was invented by Anthony Michell in 1917.

== Construction ==
A swashplate consists of a disk attached to a shaft. If the disk were aligned perpendicular to the shaft, then rotating the shaft would merely turn the disk with no reciprocating (or swashplate) effect. But instead the disk is mounted at an oblique angle, which causes its edge to appear to describe a path that oscillates along the shaft's length as observed from a non-rotating point of view away from the shaft. The greater the disk's angle to the shaft, the more pronounced is this apparent linear motion. The apparent linear motion can be turned into an actual linear motion by means of a follower that does not turn with the swashplate but presses against one of the disk's two surfaces near its circumference. The device has many similarities to the cam.

== Uses ==
Swashplates can be used in an axial engine in place of a crankshaft to translate the motion of a piston into rotary motion. Such engines are the only variation of the cam engine to have any success. Internal combustion engines and Stirling engines have been built using this mechanism. Duke Engines has been working on such a platform since 1993.

The axial piston pump drives a series of pistons aligned parallel with a shaft through a swashplate to pump a fluid. A common example of a swashplate application in a fluid pump is the compressor of a present-day automobile air conditioning system. By varying the angle of the swashplate, the pistons' stroke (and, therefore, the compressor's cooling capacity) can be dynamically adjusted.

A helicopter swashplate is a pair of plates, one rotating and one fixed, that are centered on the main rotor shaft. The rotating plate is linked to the rotor head, and the fixed plate is linked to the operator controls. Displacement of the alignment of the fixed plate is transferred to the rotating plate, where it becomes reciprocal motion of the rotor blade linkages. This type of differential pitch control, known as cyclic pitch, allows the helicopter rotor to provide selective lift in any direction. The swashplate can also transfer a combined static pitch increase to all rotor blades, which is known as collective pitch.

Nutating flowmeters and pumps have similar motions to the wobble of a swashplate, but do not necessarily transform the motion to a reciprocating motion at any time.

Active electronically scanned array (AESA) radars are flat plates that can scan up to sixty degrees in any direction from directly ahead of them. By mounting an AESA radar on a swashplate, the swashplate angle is added to the electronic scan angle. The typical swashplate angle chosen for this application is 40 degrees, enabling the radar to scan a total angle of 200 degrees out of 360.
