= Anthony Michell =

Australian mechanical engineer

- Born: Anthony George Maldon Michell; 21 June 1870
- Died: 17 February 1959 (aged 88)
- Awards: Fellow of the Royal Society

Anthony George Maldon Michell FRS (21 June 1870 – 17 February 1959) was an Australian mechanical engineer of the early 20th century.

== Early life ==
Michell was born in London while his parents were on a visit to England from Australia to which they had emigrated 17 years earlier. The family returned to Maldon, Victoria, in 1872, where young Anthony attended one of the state primary schools newly established in that area. He later returned to England and attended the Perse Grammar School while his elder brother, John Henry, attended Trinity College, Cambridge. On leaving school, A.G.M. Michell matriculated and spent one year as a non-collegiate student at Cambridge. In 1889, he returned to Australia and studied civil engineering at the University of Melbourne, graduating in 1895. For the next two years he obtained practical experience in structural engineering with the firm Johns and Waygood. He then returned to University, and completed a Master of Civil Engineering degree in 1899. The next few years were spent as a consultant in hydraulic engineering. In 1901 Michell invented (in collaboration with BA Smith) a regenerative centrifugal pump, and in 1903 he invented the Cross-flow turbine. In the early 1900s he turned his attention to the theory of lubrication.

== The Michell bearing ==
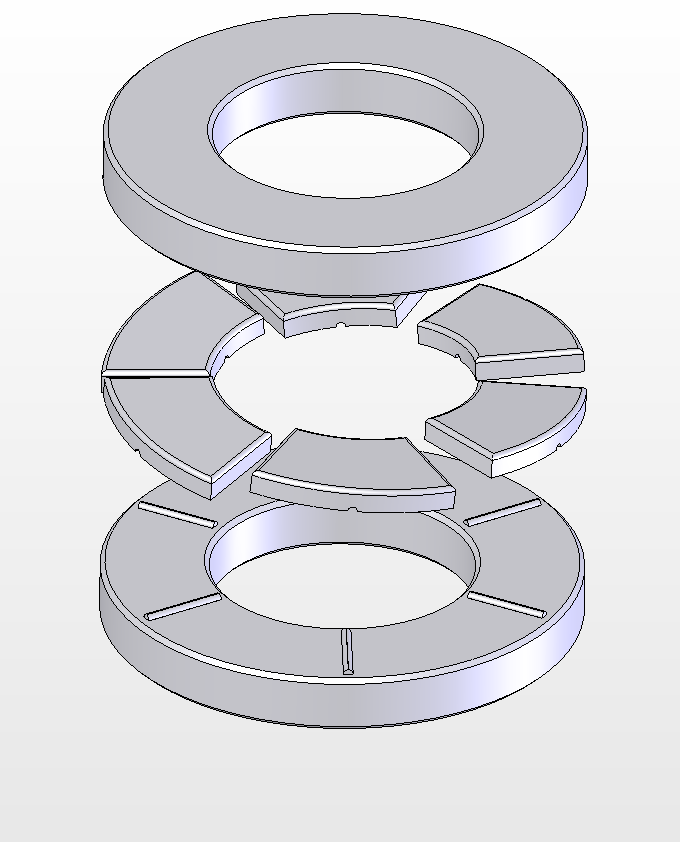
Exploded view of a Michell type thrust bearing. Note, each sector shaped pad can pivot on the ridges on the lower plate

The Michell principle, previously known as film lubrication, was originally observed and by Beauchamp Tower and Osborne Reynolds. Several years elapsed before their theories were put into practice by A.G.M. Michell, who first showed how it was possible to apply film lubrication to flat thrust surfaces and journal bearings, the result being the now widely known and universally adopted Michell bearing. Arising from Michell's research work on the mechanical properties of liquids and the mathematical studies of fluid motion viscosity and lubrication, a patent was taken out in England and Australia on 16 January 1905. In a few years his invention completely revolutionised thrust bearing technology, particularly in the field of marine propulsion and steam turbines. He was named as one of 23 "Men of Tribology" by Duncan Dowson.

The company of Michell Bearings Limited was established in Newcastle upon Tyne, England, in 1920. Principal shareholders at that time were Vickers, Fairfield Rowan, John Brown Engineering and Cammell Laird.

== Structural optimisation ==
In 1904 Michell published a paper on structural optimisation which is widely considered to be the seminal paper in the discipline. Activity in this area only started to gain momentum some half century later, with the advent of electronic computers, and during his lifetime Michell would have been oblivious to the impact of his work in this field. Today optimal structures are often called Michell trusses or Michell frames

== Crankless Engines (Aust) Pty Ltd ==
In 1920 Michell formed the Crankless Engines company to develop and manufacture engines with an intriguing design that eliminated the crankshaft found in most automotive and stationary engines. The engines did not require connecting rod and bearings found in most engines and as such could be lighter and more compact.

Several companies enjoyed modest commercial success with crankless products. George Weymouth Co (Stroud, England) made crankless boosters, National Gas Co (Ashton, England) made crankless gas engines, and Sterling Engine Co (Buffalo, USA) made crankless diesel engines.

The Crankless Engines company had a workshop in the Melbourne suburb of Fitzroy. At least 55 crankless machines were built at the workshop, including steam engines, gas engines, compressors, water pumps, car engines, airplane engines, and gas boosters.

Two notable employees of the firm were T.L Sherman who held U.S. patent 2,475,295 on the crankless mechanism, and Phil Irving who would much later become a famed Australian motorcycle and racing engineer.

Crankless Engines was placed in receivership in February 1945.

== Later years ==
In May 1934, Michell was elected a Fellow of the Royal Society in the first year of his nomination. In 1938, he received the Kernot Memorial Medal from the University of Melbourne, which was awarded for distinguished engineering achievement in Australia. He was the recipient of the James Watt International Medal in 1942 on the nomination of the Institution of Engineers (Australia), the Engineering Institute of Canada, and the South African Institution of Engineers.

In 1950, at the age of eighty, Michell published his book on lubrication. It covers many topics in a brief format and includes his own research. The book is used as a resource for students studying the subject.

Anthony George Maldon Michell was a bachelor and lived in Prospect Hill Road, Camberwell, until his death in 1959 at the age of eighty-eight.

In 1978 the Institution of Engineers Australia created the AGM Michell Medal, which is awarded annually for outstanding service in the profession of mechanical engineering.
